= 1920 St. Louis Browns season =

Major League Baseball season

1920 St. Louis Browns
- League: American League
- Ballpark: Sportsman's Park
- City: St. Louis, Missouri
- Record: 76–77 (.497)
- League place: 4th
- Owners: Phil Ball
- Managers: Jimmy Burke

The 1920 St. Louis Browns season was a season in American baseball. It involved the Browns finishing 4th in the American League with a record of 76 wins and 77 losses.

== Regular season ==
The 1920 season belonged to George Sisler. He was the American League batting champion and led all of Major League Baseball with a batting average of .407. This would be 19 points higher than the American League runner-up Tris Speaker, and 37 points higher than the National League batting champion Rogers Hornsby.

=== Season standings ===
American League
Team	W	L	Pct.	GB	Home	Road
Cleveland Indians	98	56	.636	—	51‍–‍27	47‍–‍29
Chicago White Sox	96	58	.623	2	52‍–‍25	44‍–‍33
New York Yankees	95	59	.617	3	49‍–‍28	46‍–‍31
St. Louis Browns	76	77	.497	21½	40‍–‍38	36‍–‍39
Boston Red Sox	72	81	.471	25½	41‍–‍35	31‍–‍46
Washington Senators	68	84	.447	29	37‍–‍38	31‍–‍46
Detroit Tigers	61	93	.396	37	32‍–‍46	29‍–‍47
Philadelphia Athletics	48	106	.312	50	25‍–‍50	23‍–‍56

=== Record vs. opponents ===
1920 American League record Sources:
Team	BOS	CWS	CLE	DET	NYY	PHA	SLB	WSH
Boston	—	12–10	6–16	13–9	9–13	13–9–1	9–13	10–11
Chicago	10–12	—	10–12	19–3	10–12	16–6	14–8	17–5
Cleveland	16–6	12–10	—	15–7	9–13	16–6	15–7	15–7
Detroit	9–13	3–19	7–15	—	7–15	12–10–1	10–12	13–9
New York	13–9	12–10	13–9	15–7	—	19–3	12–10	11–11
Philadelphia	9–13–1	6–16	6–16	10–12–1	3–19	—	8–14	6–16
St. Louis	13–9	8–14	7–15	12–10	10–12	14–8	—	12–9–1
Washington	11–10	5–17	7–15	9–13	11–11	16–6	9–12–1	—

=== Roster ===
1920 St. Louis Browns
Roster
Pitchers: Bill Bayne; George Boehler; Bill Burwell; Dixie Davis; Joe DeBerry; Bert Gallia; Lefty Leifield; Hod Leverette; Adrian Lynch; Ray Richmond; Roy Sanders; John Scheneberg; Urban Shocker; Allen Sothoron; Elam Vangilder; Carl Weilman	Catchers: Josh Billings; Pat Collins; Hank Severeid; Infielders: Jimmy Austin; Joe Gedeon; Wally Gerber; Dud Lee; Marty McManus; Billy Mullen; John Shovlin; George Sisler; Earl Smith; Paul Speraw; Frank Thompson	Outfielders: Baby Doll Jacobson; Lyman Lamb; Earl Pruess; Jack Tobin; Dutch Wetzel; Ken Williams; Other batters: Johnnie Heving	Manager: Jimmy Burke

== Player stats ==
= Indicates team leader

= Indicates league leader

=== Batting ===
==== Starters by position ====
Note: Pos = Position; G = Games played; AB = At bats; H = Hits; Avg. = Batting average; HR = Home runs; RBI = Runs batted in

Pos	Player	G	AB	H	Avg.	HR	RBI
C	Hank Severeid	123	422	117	.277	2	49
1B	George Sisler	154	631	257	.407	19	122
2B	Joe Gedeon	153	606	177	.292	0	61
SS	Wally Gerber	154	584	163	.279	2	60
3B	Jimmy Austin	83	280	76	.271	1	32
OF	Ken Williams	141	521	160	.307	10	72
OF	Jack Tobin	147	593	202	.341	4	62
OF	Baby Doll Jacobson	154	609	216	.355	9	122

==== Other batters ====
Note: G = Games played; AB = At bats; H = Hits; Avg. = Batting average; HR = Home runs; RBI = Runs batted in

Player	G	AB	H	Avg.	HR	RBI
Earl Smith	103	353	108	.306	3	55
Josh Billings	66	155	43	.277	0	11
Frank Thompson	22	53	9	.170	0	5
Pat Collins	23	28	6	.214	0	6
Lyman Lamb	9	24	9	.375	0	4
Dutch Wetzel	7	21	9	.429	0	5
John Shovlin	7	7	2	.286	0	2
Billy Mullen	2	4	0	.000	0	0
Marty McManus	1	3	1	.333	0	1
Dud Lee	1	2	2	1.000	0	1
Paul Speraw	1	2	0	.000	0	0
Johnnie Heving	1	1	0	.000	0	0
Earl Pruess	1	0	0	----	0	0

=== Pitching ===
==== Starting pitchers ====
Note: G = Games pitched; IP = Innings pitched; W = Wins; L = Losses; ERA = Earned run average; SO = Strikeouts

Player	G	IP	W	L	ERA	SO
Dixie Davis	38	269.1	18	12	3.17	85
Urban Shocker	38	245.2	20	10	2.71	107
Allan Sothoron	36	218.1	8	15	4.70	81
Carl Weilman	30	183.1	9	13	4.47	45
Bill Bayne	18	99.2	5	6	3.70	38
Joe DeBerry	10	54.2	2	4	4.94	12
Ray Richmond	2	17.0	2	0	6.35	4

==== Other pitchers ====
Note: G = Games pitched; IP = Innings pitched; W = Wins; L = Losses; ERA = Earned run average; SO = Strikeouts

Player	G	IP	W	L	ERA	SO
Elam Vangilder	24	104.2	3	8	5.50	25
Adrian Lynch	5	22.1	2	0	5.24	8
Roy Sanders	8	17.1	1	1	5.19	2
Hod Leverette	3	10.1	0	2	5.23	0
George Boehler	3	7.0	0	1	7.71	2
Bert Gallia	2	3.2	0	1	7.36	0

==== Relief pitchers ====
Note: G = Games pitched; W = Wins; L = Losses; SV = Saves; ERA = Earned run average; SO = Strikeouts

Player	G	W	L	SV	ERA	SO
Bill Burwell	33	6	4	4	3.65	30
Lefty Leifield	4	0	0	0	7.00	3
John Scheneberg	1	0	0	0	27.00	0
George Sisler	1	0	0	1	0.00	2
