= 1921 St. Louis Browns season =

Major League Baseball season

1921 St. Louis Browns
- League: American League
- Ballpark: Sportsman's Park
- City: St. Louis, Missouri
- Record: 81–73 (.526)
- League place: 3rd
- Owners: Phil Ball
- Managers: Lee Fohl

The 1921 St. Louis Browns season involved the Browns finishing third in the American League with a record of 81 wins and 73 losses.

== Regular season ==
=== Season standings ===
American League
Team	W	L	Pct.	GB	Home	Road
New York Yankees	98	55	.641	—	53‍–‍25	45‍–‍30
Cleveland Indians	94	60	.610	4½	51‍–‍26	43‍–‍34
St. Louis Browns	81	73	.526	17½	43‍–‍34	38‍–‍39
Washington Senators	80	73	.523	18	46‍–‍30	34‍–‍43
Boston Red Sox	75	79	.487	23½	41‍–‍36	34‍–‍43
Detroit Tigers	71	82	.464	27	37‍–‍40	34‍–‍42
Chicago White Sox	62	92	.403	36½	37‍–‍40	25‍–‍52
Philadelphia Athletics	53	100	.346	45	28‍–‍47	25‍–‍53

=== Record vs. opponents ===
1921 American League record Sources:
Team	BOS	CWS	CLE	DET	NYY	PHA	SLB	WSH
Boston	—	15–7	8–14	15–7	7–15	12–10	9–13	9–13
Chicago	7–15	—	7–15	8–14	13–9	14–8	7–15	6–16
Cleveland	14–8	15–7	—	13–9	8–14	15–7	17–5	12–10
Detroit	7–15	14–8	9–13	—	5–17	14–7–1	12–10	10–12
New York	15–7	9–13	14–8	17–5	—	17–5	13–9	13–8
Philadelphia	10–12	8–14	7–15	7–14–1	5–17	—	5–17	11–11–1
St. Louis	13–9	15–7	5–17	10–12	9–13	17–5	—	12–10
Washington	13–9	16–6	10–12	12–10	8–13	11–11–1	10–12	—

=== Roster ===
1921 St. Louis Browns
Roster
Pitchers: Bill Bayne; Bugs Bennett; George Boehler; Bernie Boland; Bill Burwell; Nick Cullop; Dixie Davis; Joe DeBerry; Dutch Henry; Ray Kolp; Emilio Palmero; Ray Richmond; Urban Shocker; Allen Sothoron; Elam Vangilder	Catchers: Josh Billings; Pat Collins; Hank Severeid; Infielders: Jimmy Austin; Frank Ellerbe; Wally Gerber; Billy Gleason; Lyman Lamb; Dud Lee; Marty McManus; Billy Mullen; Jim Riley; George Sisler; Earl Smith; Luke Stuart	Outfielders: Baby Doll Jacobson; Jack Tobin; Dutch Wetzel; Ken Williams	Manager: Lee Fohl

== Player stats ==
= Indicates team leader

=== Batting ===
==== Starters by position ====
Note: Pos = Position; G = Games played; AB = At bats; H = Hits; Avg. = Batting average; HR = Home runs; RBI = Runs batted in

Pos	Player	G	AB	H	Avg.	HR	RBI
C	Hank Severeid	143	472	153	.324	2	78
1B	George Sisler	138	582	216	.371	12	104
2B	Marty McManus	121	412	107	.260	3	64
SS	Wally Gerber	114	436	121	.278	2	48
3B	Frank Ellerbe	105	430	124	.288	2	49
OF	Ken Williams	146	547	190	.347	24	117
OF	Jack Tobin	150	671	236	.352	8	59
OF	Baby Doll Jacobson	151	599	211	.352	5	90

==== Other batters ====
Note: G = Games played; AB = At bats; H = Hits; Avg. = Batting average; HR = Home runs; RBI = Runs batted in

Player	G	AB	H	Avg.	HR	RBI
Dud Lee	72	180	30	.167	0	11
Lyman Lamb	45	134	34	.254	1	17
Dutch Wetzel	61	119	25	.210	2	10
Pat Collins	58	111	27	.243	1	10
Earl Smith	25	78	26	.333	2	14
Billy Gleason	26	74	19	.257	0	8
Jimmy Austin	27	66	18	.273	0	2
Josh Billings	20	46	10	.217	0	4
Jim Riley	4	11	0	.000	0	0
Billy Mullen	4	4	0	.000	0	0
Luke Stuart	3	3	1	.333	1	2

=== Pitching ===
= Indicates league leader

==== Starting pitchers ====
Note: G = Games pitched; IP = Innings pitched; W = Wins; L = Losses; ERA = Earned run average; SO = Strikeouts

Player	G	IP	W	L	ERA	SO
Urban Shocker	47	326.2	27"	12	3.55	132
Dixie Davis	40	265.1	16	16	4.44	100
Elam Vangilder	31	180.1	11	12	3.94	48
Allan Sothoron	5	27.2	1	2	5.20	9
Bernie Boland	7	27.0	1	4	9.33	6

- Tied with Carl Mays (New York Yankees)

==== Other pitchers ====
Note: G = Games pitched; IP = Innings pitched; W = Wins; L = Losses; ERA = Earned run average; SO = Strikeouts

Player	G	IP	W	L	ERA	SO
Ray Kolp	37	166.2	8	7	4.97	43
Bill Bayne	47	164.0	11	5	4.72	82
Emilio Palmero	24	90.0	4	7	5.00	26
Ray Richmond	6	14.1	0	1	11.30	6
Nick Cullop	4	11.2	0	2	8.49	3
Bugs Bennett	3	5.2	0	0	14.29	3

==== Relief pitchers ====
Note: G = Games pitched; W = Wins; L = Losses; SV = Saves; ERA = Earned run average; SO = Strikeouts

Player	G	W	L	SV	ERA	SO
Bill Burwell	33	2	4	2	5.12	17
Joe DeBerry	10	0	1	0	6.57	1
Dutch Henry	1	0	0	0	4.50	1
George Boehler	1	0	0	0	0.00	0
