= 1923 St. Louis Browns season =

Major League Baseball season

1923 St. Louis Browns
- League: American League
- Ballpark: Sportsman's Park
- City: St. Louis, Missouri
- Record: 74–78 (.487)
- League place: 5th
- Owners: Phil Ball
- Managers: Lee Fohl and Jimmy Austin

The 1923 St. Louis Browns season involved the Browns finishing 5th in the American League with a record of 74 wins and 78 losses.

== Regular season ==
=== Season standings ===
American League
Team	W	L	Pct.	GB	Home	Road
New York Yankees	98	54	.645	—	46‍–‍30	52‍–‍24
Detroit Tigers	83	71	.539	16	45‍–‍32	38‍–‍39
Cleveland Indians	82	71	.536	16½	42‍–‍36	40‍–‍35
Washington Senators	75	78	.490	23½	43‍–‍34	32‍–‍44
St. Louis Browns	74	78	.487	24	40‍–‍36	34‍–‍42
Philadelphia Athletics	69	83	.454	29	34‍–‍41	35‍–‍42
Chicago White Sox	69	85	.448	30	30‍–‍45	39‍–‍40
Boston Red Sox	61	91	.401	37	37‍–‍40	24‍–‍51

=== Record vs. opponents ===
1923 American League record Sources:
Team	BOS	CWS	CLE	DET	NYY	PHA	SLB	WSH
Boston	—	9–13	10–12	10–12–1	8–14	13–7	4–18–1	7–15
Chicago	13–9	—	9–13	9–13	7–15	10–12	11–11–1	10–12–1
Cleveland	12–10	13–9	—	9–13	12–10	12–10	14–8	10–11
Detroit	12–10–1	13–9	13–9	—	10–12	12–10	12–10	11–11
New York	14–8	15–7	10–12	12–10	—	16–6	15–5	16–6
Philadelphia	7–13	12–10	10–12	10–12	6–16	—	9–13	15–7–1
St. Louis	18–4–1	11–11–1	8–14	10–12	5–15	13–9	—	9–13
Washington	15–7	12–10–1	11–10	11–11	6–16	7–15–1	13–9	—

=== Notable transactions ===
- May 12, 1923: Sloppy Thurston was purchased from the Browns by the Chicago White Sox.

=== Roster ===
1923 St. Louis Browns
Roster
Pitchers: Bill Bayne; Dave Danforth; Dixie Davis; Jumbo Elliott; George Grant; Ray Kolp; Hub Pruett; Charlie Root; Urban Shocker; Sloppy Thurston; Elam Vangilder; Rasty Wright	Catchers: Josh Billings; Pat Collins; Johnny Schulte; Hank Severeid; Infielders: Frank Ellerbe; Homer Ezzell; Eddie Foster; Wally Gerber; Marty McManus; Gene Robertson; Dutch Schliebner	Outfielders: Herschel Bennett; Cedric Durst; Baby Doll Jacobson; Jack Tobin; Bill Whaley; Ken Williams; Other batters: Jimmy Austin; Bill Mizeur; Harry Rice; Syl Simon	Manager: Jimmy Austin; Lee Fohl

== Player stats ==
=== Batting ===
==== Starters by position ====
Note: Pos = Position; G = Games played; AB = At bats; H = Hits; Avg. = Batting average; HR = Home runs; RBI = Runs batted in

Pos	Player	G	AB	H	Avg.	HR	RBI
C	Hank Severeid	122	432	133	.308	3	51
1B	Dutch Schliebner	127	444	122	.275	4	52
2B	Marty McManus	154	582	180	.309	15	94
SS	Wally Gerber	154	605	170	.281	1	62
3B	Gene Robertson	78	251	62	.247	0	17
OF	Ken Williams	147	555	198	.357	29	91
OF	Jack Tobin	151	637	202	.317	13	73
OF	Baby Doll Jacobson	147	592	183	.309	8	81

==== Other batters ====
Note: G = Games played; AB = At bats; H = Hits; Avg. = Batting average; HR = Home runs; RBI = Runs batted in

Player	G	AB	H	Avg.	HR	RBI
Homer Ezzell	88	279	68	.244	0	14
Pat Collins	85	181	32	.177	3	30
Eddie Foster	27	100	18	.180	0	4
Cedric Durst	45	85	18	.212	5	11
Bill Whaley	23	50	12	.240	0	1
Frank Ellerbe	18	49	9	.184	0	1
Josh Billings	4	9	0	.000	0	0
Herschel Bennett	5	4	0	.000	0	0
Johnny Schulte	7	3	0	.000	0	1
Harry Rice	4	3	0	.000	0	0
Bill Mizeur	1	1	0	.000	0	0
Syl Simon	1	1	0	.000	0	0
Jimmy Austin	1	0	0	----	0	0

=== Pitching ===
==== Starting pitchers ====
Note: G = Games pitched; IP = Innings pitched; W = Wins; L = Losses; ERA = Earned run average; SO = Strikeouts

Player	G	IP	W	L	ERA	SO
Elam Vangilder	41	282.1	16	17	3.06	74
Urban Shocker	43	277.1	20	12	3.41	109
Dave Danforth	38	226.1	16	14	3.94	96
Dixie Davis	19	109.1	4	6	3.62	36

==== Other pitchers ====
Note: G = Games pitched; IP = Innings pitched; W = Wins; L = Losses; ERA = Earned run average; SO = Strikeouts

Player	G	IP	W	L	ERA	SO
Ray Kolp	34	171.1	5	12	3.89	44
Hub Pruett	32	104.1	4	7	4.31	59
Rasty Wright	20	82.2	7	4	6.42	26
Sloppy Thurston	2	4.0	0	0	6.75	0

==== Relief pitchers ====
Note: G = Games pitched; W = Wins; L = Losses; SV = Saves; ERA = Earned run average; SO = Strikeouts

Player	G	W	L	SV	ERA	SO
Charlie Root	27	0	4	0	5.70	27
Bill Bayne	19	2	2	0	4.50	15
George Grant	4	0	0	0	5.19	2
Jumbo Elliott	1	0	0	0	27.00	0
