= 1922 St. Louis Browns season =

Major League Baseball season

1922 St. Louis Browns
- League: American League
- Ballpark: Sportsman's Park
- City: St. Louis, Missouri
- Record: 93–61 (.604)
- League place: 2nd
- Owners: Phil Ball
- Managers: Lee Fohl

The 1922 St. Louis Browns season was a season in American baseball. It involved the Browns winning 93 games, the only time in franchise history that the Browns topped the 90 win plateau. In the American League standings, the Browns finished in second place behind the New York Yankees. The Browns set a franchise record with 712,918 fans coming to watch the games. This was approximately 100,000 higher than the previous high. The franchise would never approach this figure again in the St. Louis portion of franchise history; it would remain the franchise record for attendance until 1954, their first year in Baltimore. The 93 wins would remain a franchise record until the 1961 Orioles won 95 games.

== Regular season ==
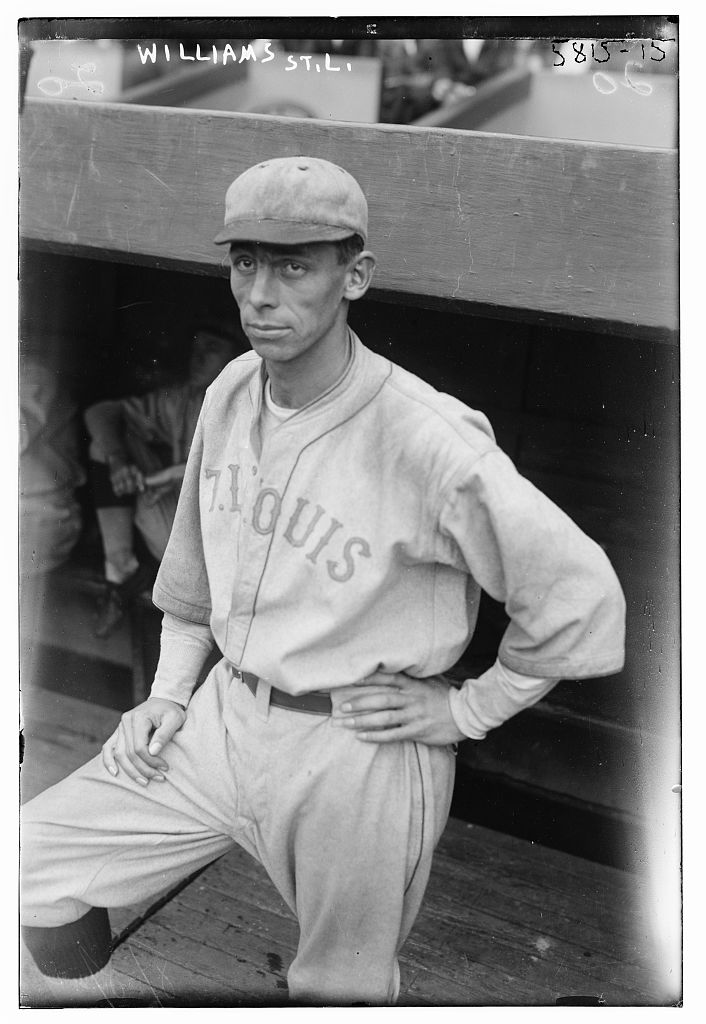
Ken Williams

The Browns of 1922 had one of the best seasons in the history of the franchise. As a team, the Browns had a batting average of .310, which led the entire Major Leagues.

George Sisler had a batting average of .420, which was the third highest batting average in the 20th century. Sisler led the league with 246 hits, 18 triples, 134 runs scored and 51 stolen bases. It was the only time that a Brown would lead the American League in triples and runs scored. It would also be the last time that a Brown led the American League in batting average.

Ken Williams became the first player in the history of Major League Baseball to hit 30 home runs and steal 30 bases in a season. The feat would not be accomplished again until Willie Mays did it in 1957. Williams batted .332 and led the American League with 39 home runs and 155 runs batted in. He also stole 37 bases, finishing second in the league to Sisler.

The Browns were in first place for 69 days but the New York Yankees overtook them on September 8. The Browns could have regained first place but lost two of three games to New York in a later September series. In the last game of the series, the Browns had a 2–0 lead in the eighth inning. New York scored once in the eighth and then scored two more runs in the ninth inning to win the game.

On the second to last day of the season, the Boston Red Sox sent rookie pitcher Alex Ferguson to pitch against New York. The Yankees countered with Waite Hoyt who allowed only one run over eight innings. The win clinched the pennant for the Yankees.

=== Season standings ===
American League
Team	W	L	Pct.	GB	Home	Road
New York Yankees	94	60	.610	—	50‍–‍27	44‍–‍33
St. Louis Browns	93	61	.604	1	54‍–‍23	39‍–‍38
Detroit Tigers	79	75	.513	15	43‍–‍34	36‍–‍41
Cleveland Indians	78	76	.506	16	44‍–‍35	34‍–‍41
Chicago White Sox	77	77	.500	17	43‍–‍34	34‍–‍43
Washington Senators	69	85	.448	25	40‍–‍39	29‍–‍46
Philadelphia Athletics	65	89	.422	29	38‍–‍39	27‍–‍50
Boston Red Sox	61	93	.396	33	31‍–‍42	30‍–‍51

=== Record vs. opponents ===
1922 American League record Sources:
Team	BOS	CWS	CLE	DET	NYY	PHA	SLB	WSH
Boston	—	10–12	6–16	5–17	13–9	10–12	7–15	10–12
Chicago	12–10	—	12–10–1	17–5	9–13	12–10	8–14	7–15
Cleveland	16–6	10–12–1	—	15–7	7–15	11–11	6–16	13–9
Detroit	17–5	5–17	7–15	—	11–11	16–6–1	9–13	14–8
New York	9–13	13–9	15–7	11–11	—	17–5	14–8	15–7
Philadelphia	12–10	10–12	11–11	6–16–1	5–17	—	9–13	12–10
St. Louis	15–7	14–8	16–6	13–9	8–14	13–9	—	14–8
Washington	12–10	15–7	9–13	8–14	7–15	10–12	8–14	—

=== Opening Day lineup ===
- Jack Tobin RF
- Frank Ellerbe 3B
- George Sisler 1B
- Ken Williams LF
- Baby Doll Jacobson CF
- Hank Severeid C
- Wally Gerber SS
- Marty McManus 2B
- Urban Shocker P

=== Roster ===
1922 St. Louis Browns
Roster
Pitchers: Bill Bayne; Dave Danforth; Dixie Davis; Dutch Henry; Ray Kolp; Heinie Meine; Hub Pruett; Urban Shocker; Elam Vangilder; Rasty Wright	Catchers: Josh Billings; Pat Collins; Hank Severeid; Infielders: Jimmy Austin; Herman Bronkie; Frank Ellerbe; Eddie Foster; Wally Gerber; Marty McManus; Gene Robertson; George Sisler	Outfielders: Cedric Durst; Baby Doll Jacobson; Chick Shorten; Jack Tobin; Ken Williams	Manager: Lee Fohl

== Player stats ==
= Indicates team leader

= Indicates league leader

=== Batting ===
==== Starters by position ====
Note: Pos = Position; G = Games played; AB = At bats; H = Hits; Avg. = Batting average; HR = Home runs; RBI = Runs batted in

Pos	Player	G	AB	H	Avg.	HR	RBI
C	Hank Severeid	137	517	166	.321	3	78
1B	George Sisler	142	586	246	.420	8	105
2B	Marty McManus	154	606	189	.312	11	109
SS	Wally Gerber	153	604	161	.267	1	51
3B	Frank Ellerbe	91	342	84	.246	1	33
OF	Ken Williams	153	585	194	.332	39	155
OF	Jack Tobin	146	625	207	.331	13	66
OF	Baby Doll Jacobson	145	555	176	.317	9	102

==== Other batters ====
Note: G = Games played; AB = At bats; H = Hits; Avg. = Batting average; HR = Home runs; RBI = Runs batted in

Player	G	AB	H	Avg.	HR	RBI
Eddie Foster	37	144	44	.306	0	12
Chick Shorten	55	131	36	.275	2	16
Pat Collins	63	127	29	.307	8	23
Herman Bronkie	23	64	18	.281	0	2
Jimmy Austin	15	31	9	.290	0	1
Gene Robertson	18	27	8	.296	0	1
Cedric Durst	15	12	4	.333	0	0
Josh Billings	5	7	3	.429	0	1

=== Pitching ===
==== Starting pitchers ====
Note: G = Games pitched; IP = Innings pitched; W = Wins; L = Losses; ERA = Earned run average; SO = Strikeouts

Player	G	IP	W	L	ERA	SO
Urban Shocker	48	348.0	24	17	2.97	149
Elam Vangilder	43	245.0	19	13	3.42	63
Dixie Davis	25	174.1	11	6	4.08	65

==== Other pitchers ====
Note: G = Games pitched; IP = Innings pitched; W = Wins; L = Losses; ERA = Earned run average; SO = Strikeouts

Player	G	IP	W	L	ERA	SO
Ray Kolp	32	169.2	14	4	3.93	54
Rasty Wright	31	154.0	9	7	2.92	44
Hub Pruett	39	119.2	7	7	2.33	70
Bill Bayne	26	92.2	4	5	4.56	38
Dave Danforth	20	79.2	5	2	3.28	48

Note: Hub Pruett was team leader in saves with 7.

==== Relief pitchers ====
Note: G = Games pitched; W = Wins; L = Losses; SV = Saves; ERA = Earned run average; SO = Strikeouts

Player	G	W	L	SV	ERA	SO
Dutch Henry	4	0	0	0	5.40	3
Heinie Meine	1	0	0	0	4.50	0
