= Hanging Curve =

1999 novel by Troy Soos

- Author: Troy Soos
- Language: English
- Publication date: 1999

Hanging Curve (1999) is the sixth novel in the Mickey Rawlings baseball mystery series written by Troy Soos. It is set in Saint Louis, Missouri.

== Characters ==
Major:

- Mickey Rawlings, utility infielder for the St. Louis Browns of the American League
- Marguerite (Margie) Turner, former actress and Mickey's live-in girlfriend
- Karl Landfors, civil rights activist and friend of Mickey's
- Franklin Aubury, black lawyer and associate of Landfors who Mickey meets
- Lee Fohl, manager of the Browns
- Phil Ball, general manager of the Browns
- J.D. Whalen, pitcher/infielder of the Elcars who murdered Crawford by mob

Minor:

- Marty McManus, second baseman for the Browns whom Mickey mentors
- Sherman "Slip" Crawford, pitcher for the St. Louis Stars of the Negro National League, married to wife Hannah
- Melvin "Tater" Greene, former Rawlings teammate who coaxes him to play for a semipro team in an exhibition
- Roy Enoch, owner of Enoch's Elcars and manager of a car dealership
- Brian Padgett, shortstop, Enoch's Elcars
- Denver Jones, infielder, East St. Louis Clubs
- Ed Moss, policeman and manager of Enoch's Elcars

Historical: (partial listing)

- James "Cool Papa" Bell, credited as "Jimmy Bell", mentioned as pitching and fielding for the Stars and Cubs
- Oscar Charleston, player for the Indianapolis ABC's
- Urban Shocker, pitcher for the Browns
- George Sisler, infielder for the Browns
- Branch Rickey, manager of the NL rival Cardinals
- Babe Ruth, outfielder for the New York Yankees, who visits town in 1922
- Ken Williams, outfielder for the Browns
- Baseball Commissioner Judge Kenesaw Mountain Landis

== Plot ==
Mickey Rawlings has just been traded from the NL Cincinnati Reds to the AL St. Louis Browns, a proverbial team on the rise, but is stuck on the bench. Melvin Greene approaches him to play in an exhibition under an assumed name (Mickey Welch) for Enoch's Elcars, a semipro team from East St. Louis, Illinois. Mickey agrees, but comes to regret it after going 0 for 4 with 3 strikeouts against Slip Crawford, a ringer for the Elcars' opponents, the East Saint Louis Cubs, who win the game 9-5 despite several unsavoury incidents.

As the Browns open a promising season with victory over the Chicago White Sox, East St. Louis marks the passing of Crawford, apparently lynched by a mob of white men after J.D. Whalen, who looked terrible against him in the exhibition, said he heard him insult a white woman. Most of the Elcars and Enoch are members of the Ku Klux Klan. Mickey is recruited by Karl Landfors and Franklin Aubury to investigate the crime.

Rawlings is performing terribly at the plate, is temporarily abandoned by live-in girlfriend Margie Turner after she reveals she had married someone else when she was younger on a dare (and therefore could not marry him), and as worse comes to worst, is suspended for fifteen days after his participation in the semipro game is revealed. But his investigation introduces him to the world of Black America, as revealed in his interactions with Aubury, Bell and other black men. Rawlings' investigations take him to Indianapolis and Evansville, Indiana, even as the Klan try to get him on their side.

Rawlings learns that the reason for Crawford's death leads back to the riots of 1917 in St. Louis.
