= Lee Fohl =

American baseball player and manager (1876–1965)

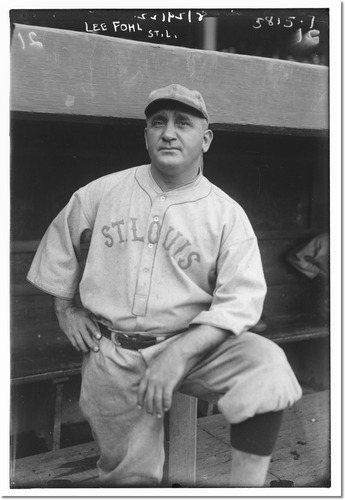
- Catcher / Manager
- Born: November 28, 1876; Lowell, Ohio, U.S.
- Died: October 30, 1965 (aged 88); Brooklyn, Ohio, U.S.
- Batted: Left Threw: Right

MLB debut
- August 29, 1902, for the Pittsburgh Pirates

Last MLB appearance
- September 27, 1903, for the Cincinnati Reds

MLB statistics
- Batting average: .294
- Home runs: 0
- Runs batted in: 3
- Stats at Baseball Reference

Teams
- As player: Pittsburgh Pirates (1902); Cincinnati Reds (1903); As manager: Cleveland Indians (1915–1919); St. Louis Browns (1921–1923); Boston Red Sox (1924–1926)

Leo Alexander Fohl (November 28, 1876 – October 30, 1965) was an American manager in Major League Baseball for the Cleveland Indians, St. Louis Browns, and Boston Red Sox.

== Biography ==
Born in Lowell, Ohio, Fohl's involvement in professional baseball began in the early 1900s, when he served as a catcher for minor-league clubs in Ohio. His subsequent major-league playing career consisted of just five games as a catcher and 17 at-bats over two seasons. In 1915, he took over as manager of the Indians, with his best finish coming in 1918 when the Tribe finished in second place behind the Red Sox. He never made an important move, however, without consulting Tris Speaker, who arrived via a trade with Boston in the same year Fohl took over. In 1919, Fohl resigned as the Indians' manager after 78 games, and Speaker stepped in as manager for the remainder of the season.

Fohl resurfaced in 1921 with the Browns, where in 1922 the team was only eliminated from the pennant race on the penultimate game of the season, finishing just one game behind the New York Yankees. When the 1923 Browns fell back closer (but still above) .500, he was fired in midseason. In 1924, he joined the Red Sox, where he finished his managerial career on a dismal note; his Red Sox teams never finished higher than seventh place. (In fact, he was the only man to manage in the American League between 1924 and 1926 and not be enshrined in the Hall of Fame.) He finished with a 713-792 (.474 winning percentage) as manager. He managed the Toronto Maple Leafs of the International League in 1927, but was fired mid-way through the season.

He died in Brooklyn, Ohio at age 88.

== Managerial record ==
Team	Year	Regular season					Postseason			
Team	Year	Games	Won	Lost	Win %	Finish	Won	Lost	Win %	Result
CLE	1915	124	45	79	.363	7th in AL	–	–	–	–
CLE	1916	154	77	77	.500	6th in AL	–	–	–	–
CLE	1917	154	88	66	.571	3rd in AL	–	–	–	–
CLE	1918	127	73	54	.575	2nd in AL	–	–	–	–
CLE	1919	78	44	34	.564	resigned	–	–	–	–
CLE total		637	327	310	.513		0	0	–	
SLB	1921	154	81	73	.526	3rd in AL	–	–	–	–
SLB	1922	154	93	61	.604	2nd in AL	–	–	–	–
SLB	1923	101	52	49	.515	fired	–	–	–	–
SLB total		409	226	183	.553		0	0	–	
BOS	1924	154	67	87	.435	7th in AL	–	–	–	–
BOS	1925	152	47	105	.309	8th in AL	–	–	–	–
BOS	1926	153	46	107	.301	8th in AL	–	–	–	–
BOS total		459	160	299	.349		0	0	–	
Total		1505	713	792	.474		0	0	–	
