= Earl Pruess =

American baseball player (1895-1979)

- Right fielder
- Born: April 2, 1895; Chicago
- Died: August 28, 1979 (aged 84); Branson, Missouri
- Batted: Right Threw: Right

MLB debut
- September 15, 1920, for the St. Louis Browns

Last MLB appearance
- September 15, 1920, for the St. Louis Browns

MLB statistics
- Games played: 1
- Base on balls: 1
- Runs: 1
- Stats at Baseball Reference

Teams
- St. Louis Browns (1920)

Earl Henry "Gibby" Pruess (April 2, 1895 – August 28, 1979) was an American Major League Baseball right fielder who played in one game for the St. Louis Browns on September 15, 1920. He walked in his only plate appearance.
