= Adrian Lynch =

American baseball player (1897-1934)

- Pitcher
- Born: February 9, 1897; Laurens, Iowa, U.S.
- Died: March 16, 1934 (aged 37); Davenport, Iowa, U.S.
- Batted: Both Threw: Right

MLB debut
- August 4, 1920, for the St. Louis Browns

Last MLB appearance
- October 2, 1920, for the St. Louis Browns

MLB statistics
- Win–loss record: 2–0
- Earned run average: 5.24
- Strikeouts: 8
- Stats at Baseball Reference

Teams
- St. Louis Browns (1920)

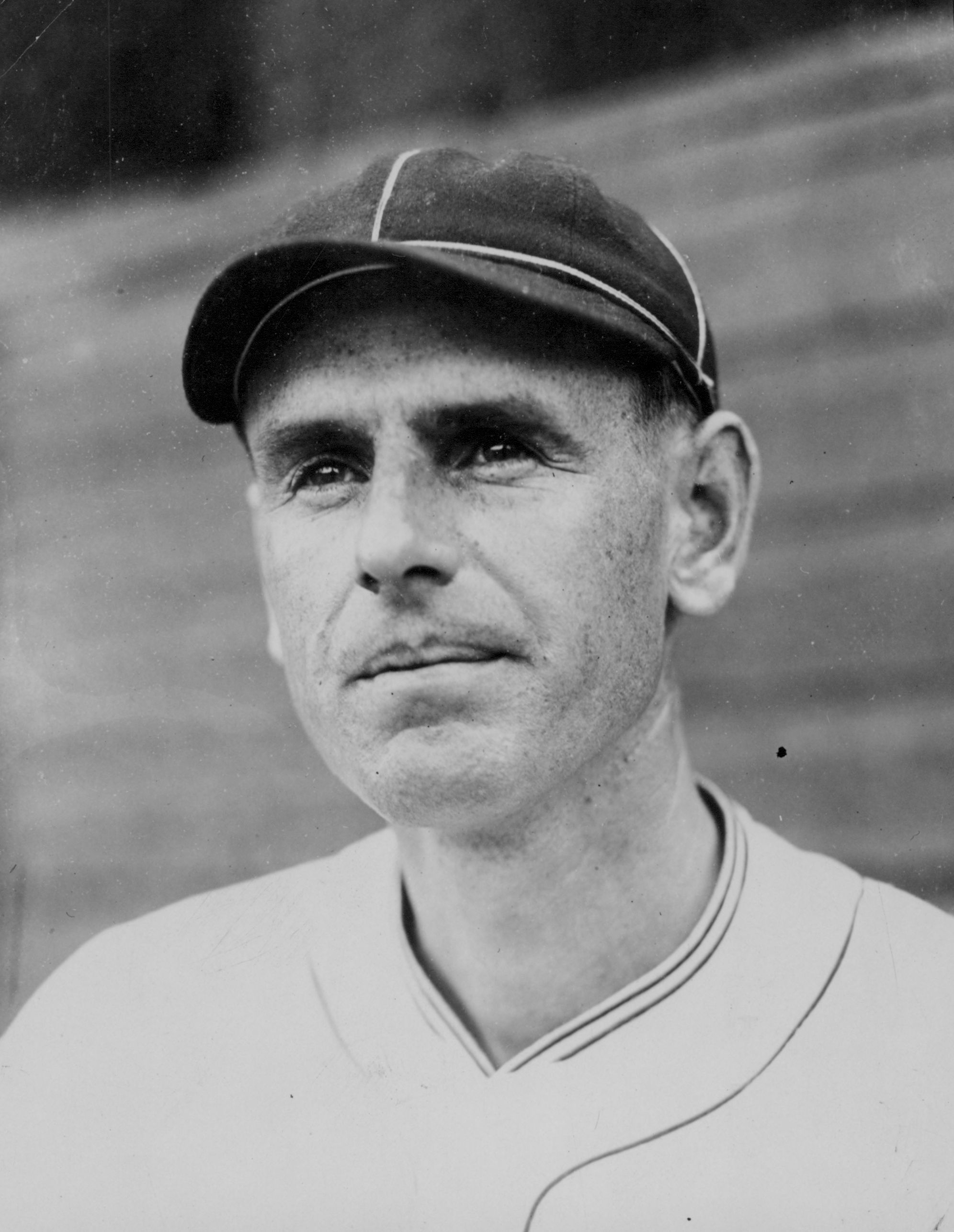
Adrian Lynch ca. 1920

Adrian Ryan Lynch (February 9, 1897 – March 16, 1934) was an American Major League Baseball pitcher who appeared in five games, three of which were starts, for the St. Louis Browns in 1920.
