= Dutch Wetzel =

American baseball player (1893–1942)

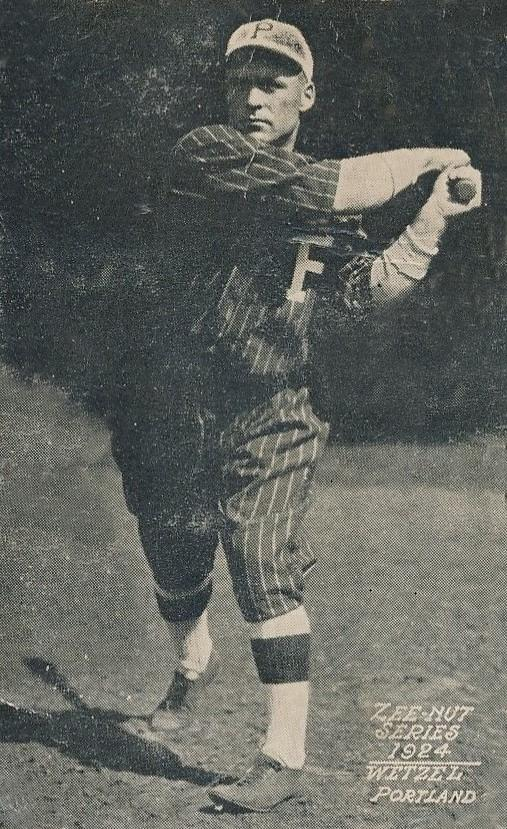
- Outfielder
- Born: July 7, 1893; Columbus, Indiana, US
- Died: March 5, 1942 (aged 48); Hollywood, California, US
- Batted: Right Threw: Right

MLB debut
- September 15, 1920, for the St. Louis Browns

Last MLB appearance
- October 2, 1921, for the St. Louis Browns

MLB statistics
- Batting average: .243
- Home runs: 2
- Runs batted in: 15
- Stats at Baseball Reference

Teams
- St. Louis Browns (1920–1921)

Franklin Burton "Dutch" Wetzel (July 7, 1893 in Columbus, Indiana – March 5, 1942 in Hollywood, California) was an American right-handed outfielder who played for the St. Louis Browns from 1920 to 1921.

He made his big league debut on September 15, 1920, at the age of 27. Facing the Boston Red Sox, he came into the game as a replacement player for Baby Doll Jacobson, going 0–2 at the plate. Two days later, on September 17, he collected his first career hit. Overall, he hit .429 in seven games in 1920, walking four times and striking out only once in 21 at-bats.

In 1921, Wetzel played in 61 games for the Browns, hitting .210 in 119 at-bats. Through the month of April that year his average was .364; however it steadily declined from that point. Of his 25 hits, two were doubles and two were home runs. He played in his final big league game on October 2, 1921.

Overall, Wetzel hit .243 in 68 major league games, collecting 34 hits in 140 at-bats. He scored 21 runs and drove 15 runs in.

Though his major league career was short, Wetzel spent 13 seasons in the minor leagues, hitting .324 with 1,503 hits. In 1920 with the Flint Halligans, he hit .387 with 33 doubles, 20 triples and 12 home runs in 115 games. He hit .319 with 30 doubles, 17 triples and 12 home runs in 1924, and in 1925 with the Des Moines Demons he hit .353 with 214 hits, 40 doubles, 9 triples and 32 home runs. He had a successful 1926 as well, hitting .352 with 206 hits, 58 doubles, 15 triples and 18 home runs for the Demons. After playing in only seven games in 1927, he hit .345 with 201 hits, 61 doubles, six triples and 20 home runs for the Omaha Crickets in 1928.
