= Emilio Palmero =

Cuban baseball player (1895-1970)

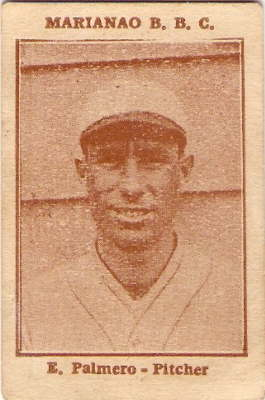
- Pitcher
- Born: June 13, 1895; Guanabacoa, Cuba
- Died: July 15, 1970 (aged 75); Toledo, Ohio, U.S.
- Batted: Left Threw: Left

MLB debut
- September 21, 1915, for the New York Giants

Last MLB appearance
- August 24, 1928, for the Boston Braves

MLB statistics
- Win–loss record: 6-15
- Strikeouts: 48
- Earned run average: 5.17
- Stats at Baseball Reference

Teams
- New York Giants (1915–16); St. Louis Browns (1921); Washington Senators (1926); Boston Braves (1928)

Member of the Cuban

Baseball Hall of Fame
- Induction: 1954

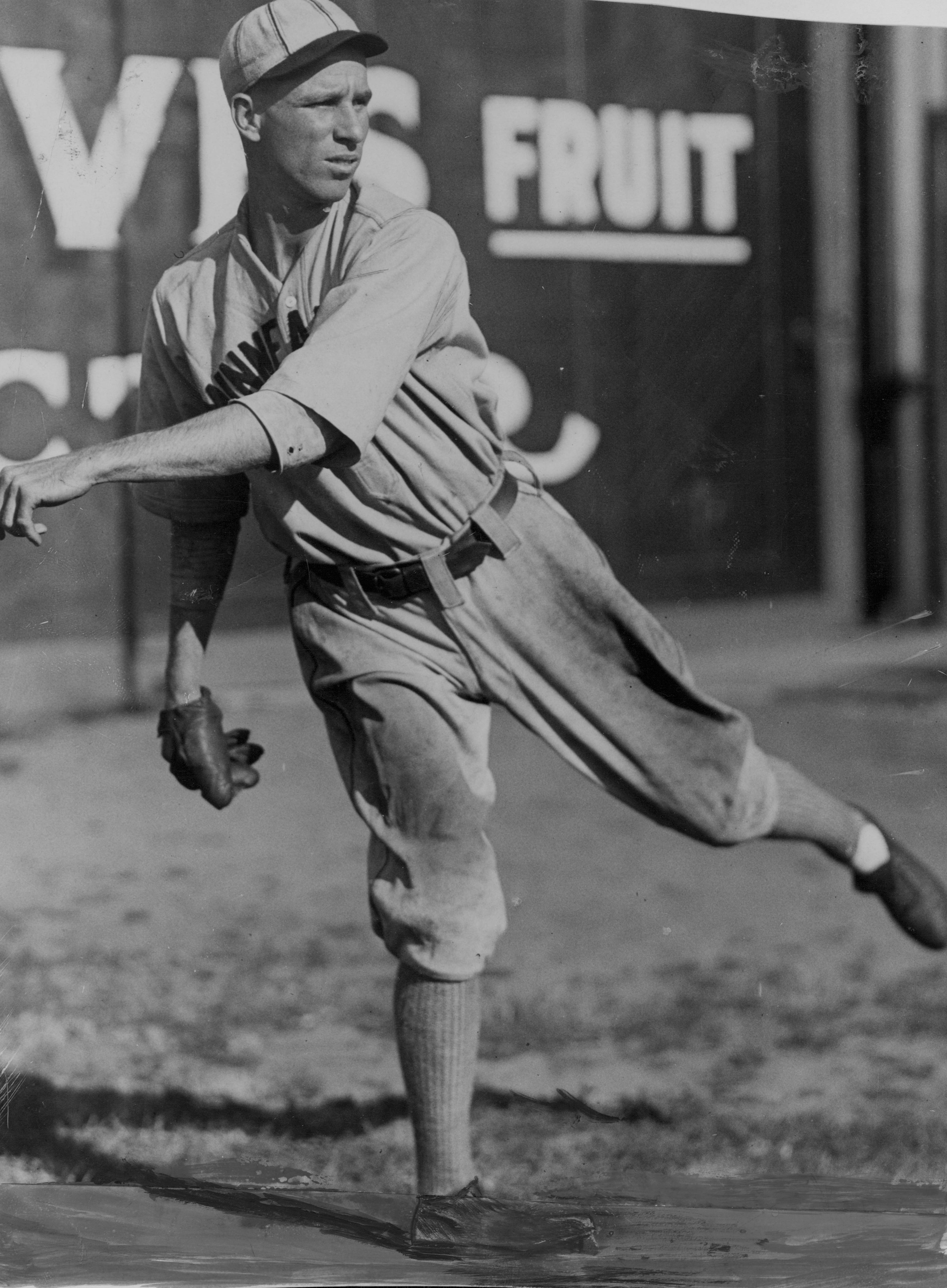
Emilio Palmero pitching for the Minneapolis Millers in the minor leagues

Emilio Antonio Palmero (June 13, 1895 – July 15, 1970) was a Cuban Major League Baseball pitcher. He played all or part of five seasons in the majors, spread out over a span of fourteen years from 1915 to 1928. He also pitched extensively in the minor leagues, winning 177 games over 17 minor league seasons between 1914 and 1931. Palmero spent just one full season in the majors, 1921 with the St. Louis Browns, during which he appeared in 24 games with a record of 4–7 and a 5.00 ERA.

Palmero played winter baseball in the Cuban League from 1913 to 1929. He led the league in winning percentage in 1919/20 and tied for the lead in wins in 1917. He was elected to the Cuban Baseball Hall of Fame in 1954.
