= Ray Richmond (baseball) =

American baseball player (1896–1969)

- Pitcher
- Born: June 5, 1896; Fillmore, Illinois
- Died: October 21, 1969 (aged 73); De Soto, Missouri
- Batted: Right Threw: Right

MLB debut
- September 25, 1920, for the St. Louis Browns

Last MLB appearance
- June 26, 1921, for the St. Louis Browns

MLB statistics
- Win–loss record: 2-1
- Earned run average: 8.62
- Strikeouts: 10

Teams
- St. Louis Browns (1920–1921)

Raymond Sinclair Richmond (June 5, 1896 – October 21, 1969) was a Major League Baseball pitcher who appeared in eight games for the St. Louis Browns in 1920 and 1921.
