= Jack Tobin =

American baseball player (1892–1969)

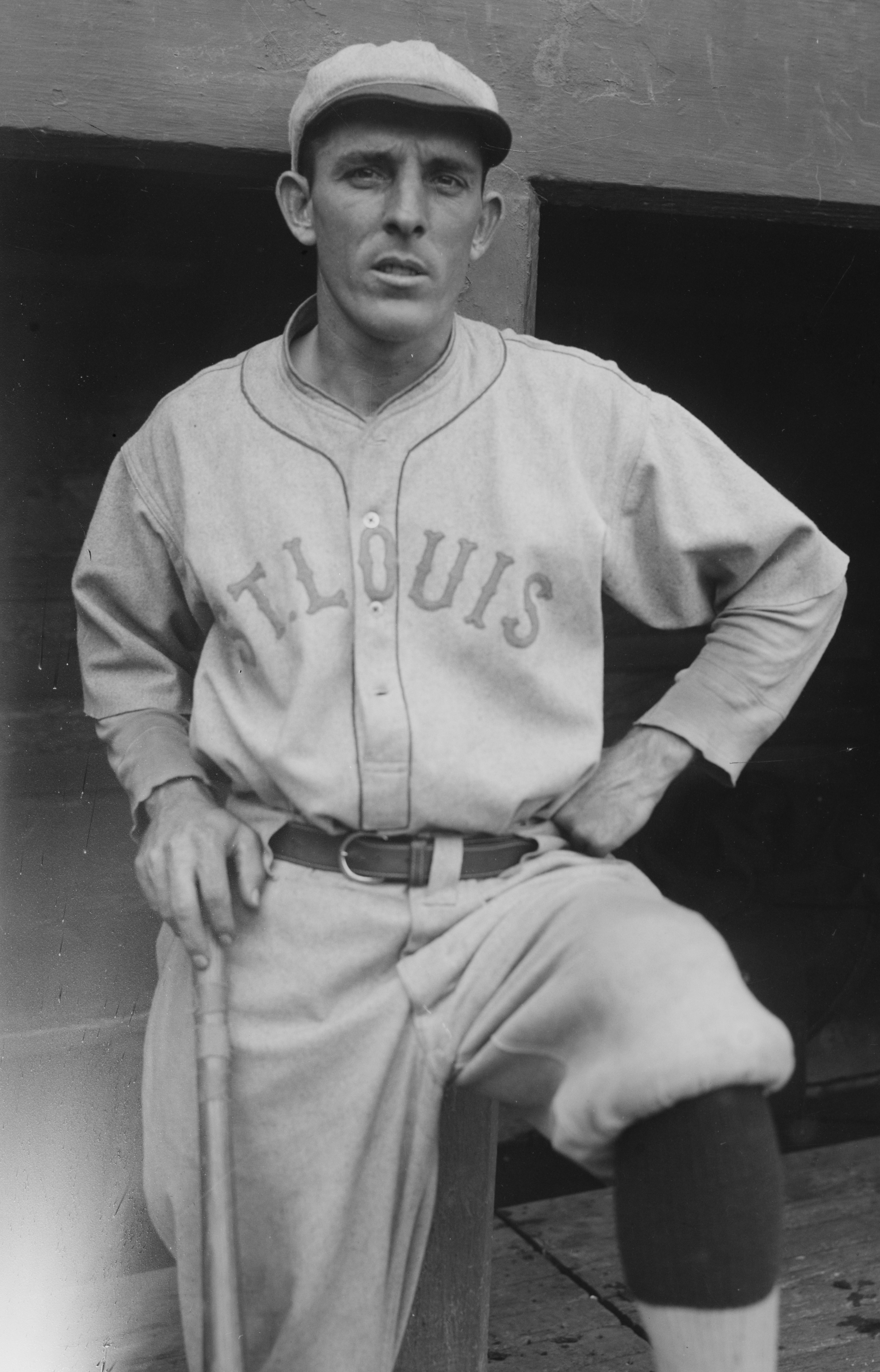
- Tobin in 1922
- Right fielder
- Born: May 4, 1892; St. Louis, Missouri, U.S.
- Died: December 10, 1969 (aged 77); St. Louis, Missouri, U.S.
- Batted: Left Threw: Left

MLB debut
- April 16, 1914, for the St. Louis Terriers

Last MLB appearance
- September 28, 1927, for the Boston Red Sox

MLB statistics
- Batting average: .309
- Home runs: 64
- Runs batted in: 585
- Stats at Baseball Reference

Teams
- St. Louis Terriers (1914–1915); St. Louis Browns (1916, 1918–1925); Washington Senators (1926); Boston Red Sox (1926–1927)

John Thomas Tobin (May 4, 1892 – December 10, 1969) was an American right fielder in Major League Baseball. He played in the Federal League (FL) for the St. Louis Terriers (1914–1915), and for the St. Louis Browns (1916, 1918–1925), Washington Senators (1926), and Boston Red Sox (1926–1927) of the American League (AL). He led the FL in hits in 1915, and he led the AL in triples in 1921.

A native of St. Louis, Tobin batted and threw left-handed. While modern sources often use the common name Jack, he was mostly known as Johnny to his friends and in contemporary coverage.

== Early life ==
Tobin was born in St. Louis to John Tobin, an Irish immigrant, and the former Louise Schiffner, a native of Missouri. He attended a Catholic primary school in St. Louis and played amateur baseball in the city as he got older.

== Baseball career ==
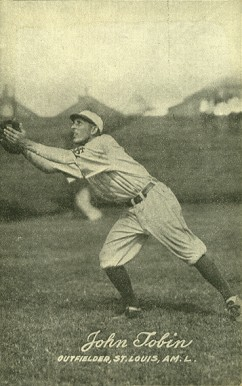
1921 baseball card of Tobin

Tobin signed with the St. Louis Terriers in 1913, a year before the FL was considered a major league. He remained with the Terriers through the 1915 season, when he led the league in hits. Tobin then spent most of his major league career with the St. Louis Browns. He had been one of eleven players the Browns purchased from the Terriers in the spring of 1916. After playing in 77 games for the Browns in 1916 and not appearing in the major leagues in 1917, Tobin was a regular starter for the Browns from 1918 to 1924.

Tobin was 5'8" tall and weighed less than 150 pounds. He had good speed and became known for his ability to bunt. "I was a .330 hitter most of my career. I'd bat .030 and bunt .300," Tobin once joked. Baseball Hall of Famer George Sisler, player-manager for the Browns in the mid-1920s, later said that Tobin was "the best drag-bunter anyone ever saw."

As Tobin became a starter in right field for the Browns, he was joining one of the best outfields in baseball. Tobin, left fielder Ken Williams, and center fielder Baby Doll Jacobson all hit over .300 each year between 1919 and 1923. Tobin himself set a career best with a .352 batting average in 1921, the second of four consecutive seasons in which he collected more than 200 hits. That year he led both leagues with 671 at-bats and tied for the league lead with 18 triples. His 236 hits and 132 runs scored that year were both the second-highest totals in the major leagues as well as career highs.

The 1922 Browns led the major leagues with a .313 combined batting average while winning 93 games. That season, Tobin batted .331 and scored 122 runs with a career-high 13 home runs. Tobin holds the MLB record for most consecutive games reaching base as a leadoff hitter with 59 games in 1922. The Browns lost a September pennant race to the New York Yankees by one game.

Before the 1926 season, Tobin and Bullet Joe Bush were traded from the Browns to the Washington Senators. By June of that season, the Senators released Tobin, and he was signed by the Boston Red Sox, with whom he finished his major league career in 1927. In a 13-season career, Tobin posted a .309 batting average (1906-for-6174) with 64 home runs and 585 runs batted in along with 936 runs scored, 294 doubles, 99 triples, 147 stolen bases, and 508 bases on balls in 1619 games played.

In the 2001 book The New Bill James Historical Baseball Abstract, writer Bill James ranked Tobin as the 92nd greatest right fielder of all time.

== Personal life ==
Tobin married the former Loretta Sack in 1914, and they had a daughter, Dorothy, in 1916. Tobin was involved in auto sales when not on the baseball field, and in 1925 he became co-owner of the Hildebrand-Tobin Motor Company in St. Louis.

After his professional baseball career ended, Tobin had some involvement in American Legion baseball, serving as a coach and arbitration board member for the St. Louis Legion League. He died of pneumonia at St. John's Mercy Hospital in St. Louis in 1969.

== See also ==
- List of Major League Baseball annual triples leaders
