= Gene Robertson =

American baseball player (1899-1981)

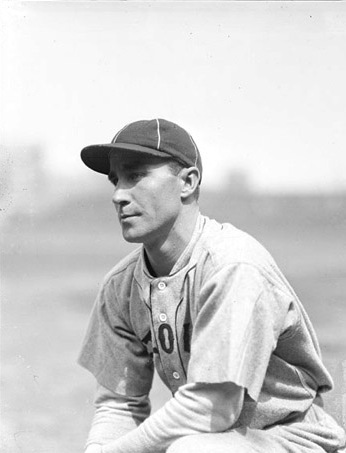
- Robertson with the St. Louis Browns in 1925
- Third baseman
- Born: December 25, 1899; St. Louis, Missouri, U.S.
- Died: October 21, 1981 (aged 81); Fallon, Nevada, U.S.
- Batted: Left Threw: Right

MLB debut
- July 4, 1919, for the St. Louis Browns

Last MLB appearance
- May 18, 1930, for the Boston Braves

MLB statistics
- Batting average: .280
- Home runs: 20
- Runs batted in: 250
- Stats at Baseball Reference

Teams
- St. Louis Browns (1919, 1922–1926); New York Yankees (1928–1929); Boston Braves (1929–1930)

Career highlights and awards
- World Series champion (1928)

Eugene Edward Robertson (December 25, 1899 – October 21, 1981) was an American professional baseball player who played infield in the Major Leagues from 1919–1930. He played for the St. Louis Browns, New York Yankees, and Boston Braves.

In nine seasons, Robertson was in 656 games played, with 2,200 at-bats, 615 hits, batting .280 with 311 runs scored, 20 home runs, 250 RBI, an on-base percentage of .344 and a slugging percentage of .373. He played in the 1928 World Series as a member of the Yankees, batting .125 (1-8) with 2 RBI.
