= Joe DeBerry =

American baseball player (1896-1944)

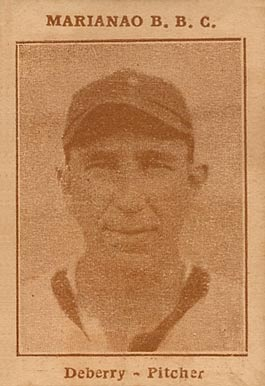
- Pitcher
- Born: November 29, 1896; Mount Gilead, North Carolina
- Died: October 9, 1944 (aged 47); Southern Pines, North Carolina
- Batted: Left Threw: Right

MLB debut
- August 24, 1920, for the St. Louis Browns

Last MLB appearance
- September 3, 1921, for the St. Louis Browns

MLB statistics
- Win–loss record: 2-5
- Earned run average: 5.24
- Strikeouts: 13

Teams
- St. Louis Browns (1920–1921)

Joseph Gaddy DeBerry (November 29, 1896 – October 9, 1944) was a Major League Baseball pitcher who played for the St. Louis Browns in 1920 and 1921.

DeBerry played college baseball for the North Carolina State College Wolfpack.
