= Dud Lee =

American baseball player (1899–1971)

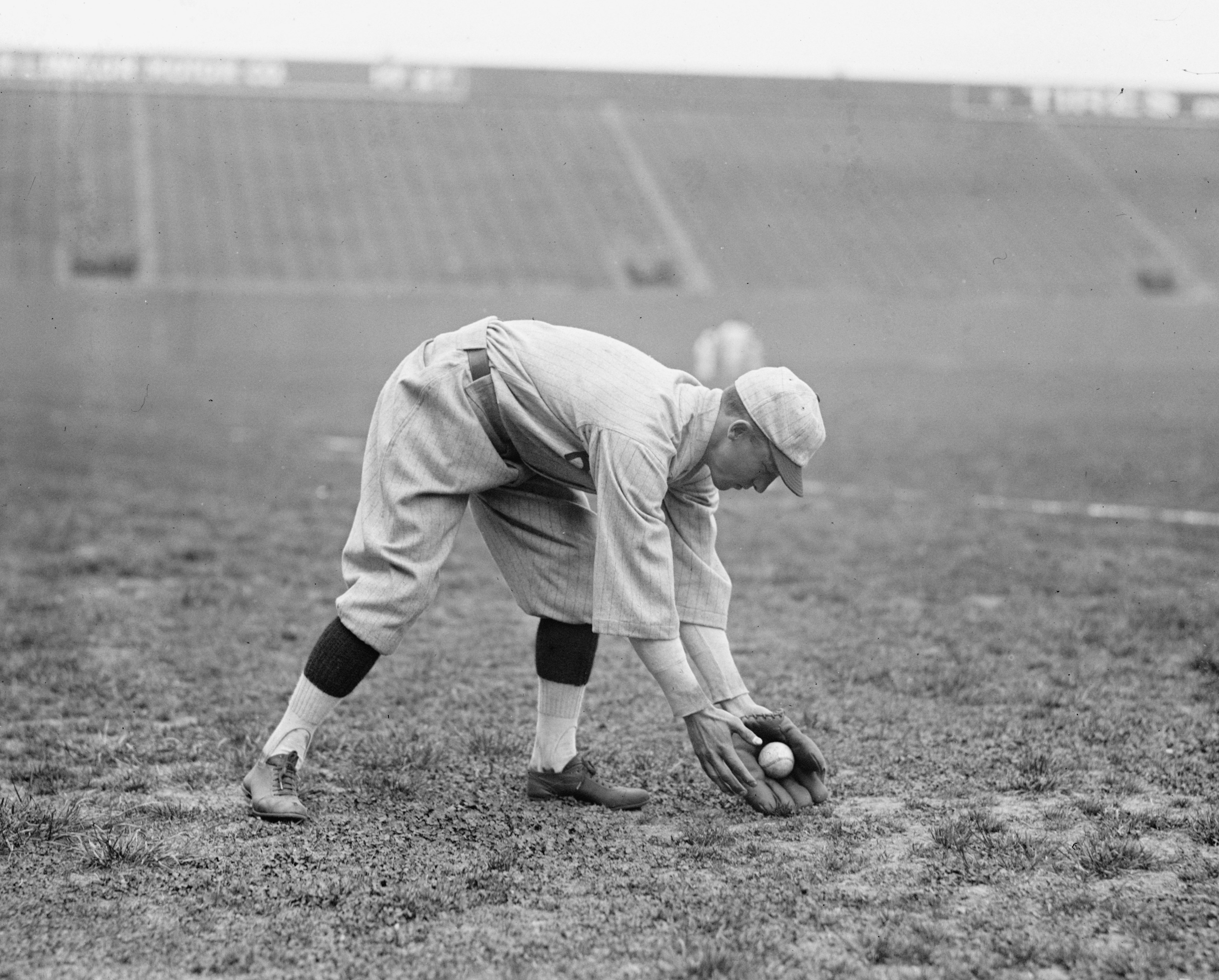
- Shortstop
- Born: August 22, 1899; Denver, Colorado, U.S.
- Died: January 7, 1971 (aged 71); Denver, Colorado, U.S.
- Batted: Left Threw: Right

MLB debut
- October 3, 1920, for the St. Louis Browns

Last MLB appearance
- April 14, 1926, for the Boston Red Sox

MLB statistics
- Batting average: .223
- Home runs: 0
- Runs batted in: 60
- Stats at Baseball Reference

Teams
- St. Louis Browns (1920–21); Boston Red Sox (1924–26)

Ernest Holford "Dud" Lee (August 22, 1899 – January 7, 1971) was an American backup infielder in Major League Baseball, playing mainly as a shortstop from 1920 through 1926 for the St. Louis Browns (1920–21) and Boston Red Sox (1924–26). Listed at 5 ft 9 in (1.75 m), 150 lb, Lee batted left-handed and threw right-handed. He was born in Denver, Colorado. While with the Browns, he played under the name Dud or Ernest Dudley in 1920–21.

In a five-season career, Lee was a .223 hitter (163-for-732) with 80 runs and 60 RBI in 253 games, including 20 doubles, nine triples, 12 stolen bases, and a .311 on-base percentage. He did not hit a home run. He made 241 infield appearances at shortstop (208), second base (30) and third base (3), committing 88 errors in 1,278 chances for a collective .931 fielding percentage.

Lee died in his homeland of Denver, Colorado, at age 71.
