= Ken Williams (baseball) =

American baseball player (1890–1959)

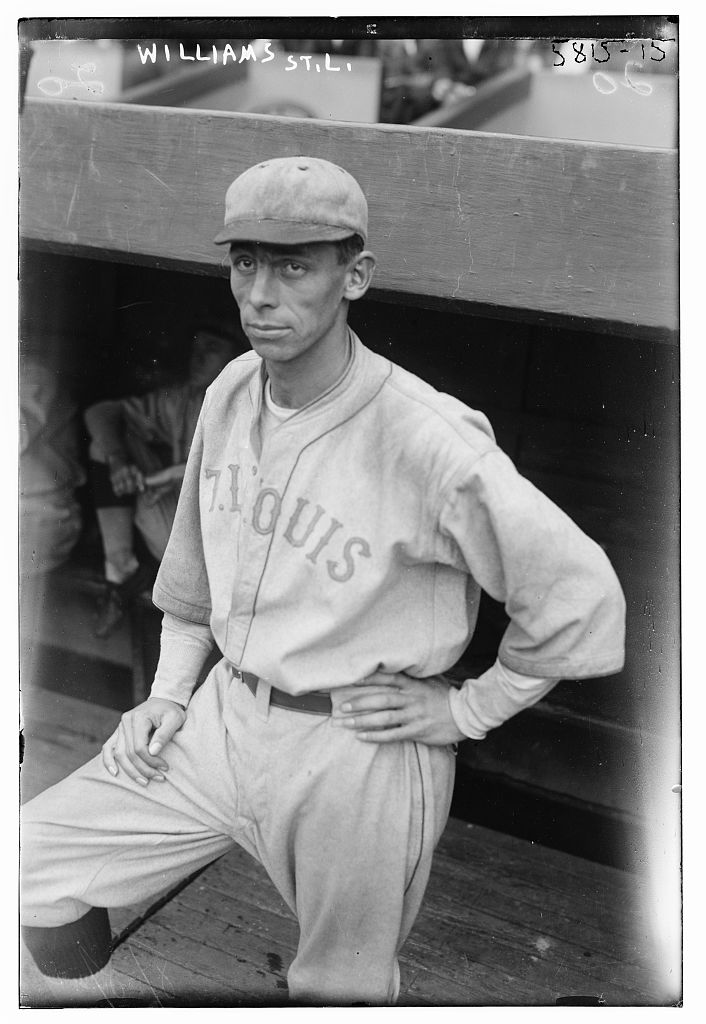
- Williams in 1922
- Left fielder
- Born: June 28, 1890; Grants Pass, Oregon, U.S.
- Died: January 22, 1959 (aged 68); Grants Pass, Oregon, U.S.
- Batted: Left Threw: Right

MLB debut
- July 14, 1915, for the Cincinnati Reds

Last MLB appearance
- August 10, 1929, for the Boston Red Sox

MLB statistics
- Batting average: .319
- Home runs: 196
- Runs batted in: 916
- Stats at Baseball Reference

Teams
- Cincinnati Reds (1915–1916); St. Louis Browns (1918–1927); Boston Red Sox (1928–1929)

Career highlights and awards
- AL home run leader (1922); AL RBI leader (1922)

Kenneth Roy Williams (June 28, 1890 – January 22, 1959) was an American professional baseball player. He played as an outfielder in Major League Baseball (MLB) from 1915 to 1929. Williams began his major league career with the Cincinnati Reds before spending the majority of his playing days with the St. Louis Browns and ended his career playing for the Boston Red Sox. He batted left-handed and threw right-handed. He became a full-time player at the age of 29 with the Browns in 1919. In 1922, Williams became the first player in MLB history to hit 30 home runs and steal 30 bases in the same season.

== Professional baseball career ==
Williams began his professional baseball career in 1913 at the age of 23, playing for the Regina Red Sox of the Western Canada League. In 1914, he played for the Edmonton Eskimos before moving to the Spokane Indians in 1915. After posting a .340 batting average in 79 games for the Indians, he made his major league debut with the Cincinnati Reds on July 14, 1915. He hit for a .242 average in 71 games for the Reds during the peak of the dead-ball era when only 6 players in the league hit above the .300 mark. He played in only 10 games for the Reds in 1916, spending most of the season with Spokane and with the Portland Beavers of the Pacific Coast League. Williams hit 24 home runs along with a .313 batting average for Portland in 1917 before being purchased by the St. Louis Browns.

Williams was drafted into the U.S. Army in April 1918, and appeared in only two games for the Browns that season. He returned to the Browns in 1919 and hit .300 with 6 home runs in 65 games. In 1920, MLB outlawed specialty pitches such as the spitball and experienced a subsequent jump in the league batting averages as well as home runs. In Williams' first full season as a regular player in 1920, he posted a .307 batting average along with 10 home runs and 72 runs batted in. He continued to improve in 1921 with a .347 batting average with 24 home runs, 117 runs batted in and a career-high .429 on-base percentage.

Williams had the best season of his career in 1922, leading the American League with 39 home runs and 155 runs batted in, as the Browns finished the season one game behind the pennant-winning New York Yankees. 32 of his 39 home runs were hit at home in Sportsman's Park. On April 22, Williams hit 3 home runs with 6 RBI against the Chicago White Sox in a 10-7 victory at Sportsman's Park. On August 7, 1922, during a game against the Washington Senators, he became the first player in American League history to hit two home runs in one inning. His 39 home runs topped Babe Ruth, who had led the league the previous four seasons, although Ruth had been suspended well into the 1922 season by Baseball Commissioner Kenesaw Mountain Landis for violating a curb on barnstorming. Williams was one of only two players to interrupt Babe Ruth's 12-year string of leading the American League in home runs, the other being Bob Meusel in 1925. Also in 1922, Williams also became the first player in major league history to have 30 home runs and 30 stolen bases in the same season; a feat which would not be achieved again until Willie Mays in 1956.

In August 1923, the Senators came into possession of one of Williams' bats and discovered that it had been bored out and plugged with a lighter wood. The bat was turned over to National League umpire George Hildebrand for investigation, and the Senators protested all the victories by the Browns in which Williams had used the bat. Williams explained that he had ordered the bat specially made, but when he received it, he found it to be too heavy, so he plugged it with a lighter wood. He was cited in the 1924 Reach Guide for using a corked bat, although MLB hadn't ruled plugged bats illegal at the time. He finished the 1923 season with a career-high .357 batting average along with 29 home runs and 91 runs batted in and ended the season 15th in Most Valuable Player Award balloting.

In November 1924, it was rumored that the Yankees were trying to trade for Williams, which would have teamed him with Ruth to make one of the most powerful home run combinations in baseball. However, St. Louis manager George Sisler's insistence on the Yankees trading Waite Hoyt for Williams was too high a price for Yankees owner Jacob Ruppert.

Williams had another productive season in 1925, hitting .331 with 25 home runs and 105 runs batted in, and led the league with a .613 slugging percentage. Williams continued to hit well for the remainder of his career with St. Louis until December 15, 1927, when he was purchased by the Boston Red Sox for $10,000. He played two more seasons for the Red Sox, hitting for a .345 average in 1929 at the age of 39. Williams returned to the minor leagues in 1930 to play two more seasons for the Beavers before retiring in 1931 at the age of 41.

== Career statistics ==
In a 14-year major league career, Williams played in 1,397 games, accumulating 1,552 hits in 4,862 at bats for a .319 career batting average along with 196 home runs, 916 runs batted in and an on-base percentage of .393. Of his 196 home runs, 142 came at his home park. He retired with a .958 fielding percentage. As baseball evolved out of the dead-ball era, Williams finished in the top four in the American League in home runs in seven consecutive seasons (1921–1927). He posted ten seasons with a batting average above .300, and three seasons in which he scored more than 100 runs. As of 2024, Williams' .319 career batting average ranked 60th all-time in major league history. His career .924 on-base plus slugging (OPS) and .530 slugging percentage ranked 50th and 51st, respectively, all-time among major league players. Williams holds the St. Louis Browns / Baltimore Orioles single season record for runs batted in with 155 in 1922. He is the Browns' all-time leader in on-base percentage (.403), slugging percentage (.558), and OPS (.961). In his 2001 book The New Bill James Historical Baseball Abstract, Bill James ranked Williams as the 50th greatest left fielder of all-time.

== Post-baseball ==
Williams returned to Grants Pass and worked as a police officer before becoming owner and operator of the Owl Club, a restaurant and billiard parlor on G Street.

== See also ==
- List of Major League Baseball career batting average leaders
- List of Major League Baseball career on-base percentage leaders
- List of Major League Baseball career slugging percentage leaders
- List of Major League Baseball career OPS leaders
- List of Major League Baseball annual home run leaders
- List of Major League Baseball annual runs batted in leaders
