= Earl Smith (1910s outfielder) =

American baseball player (1891–1943)

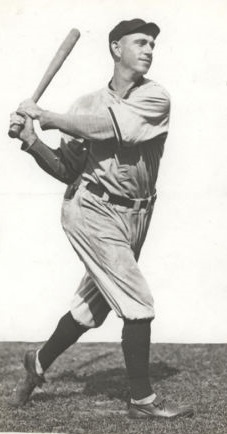
- Smith in 1916
- Outfielder / Third baseman
- Born: January 20, 1891; Oak Hill, Ohio, U.S.
- Died: March 13, 1943 (aged 52); Portsmouth, Ohio, U.S.
- Batted: Both Threw: Left

MLB debut
- September 10, 1916, for the Chicago Cubs

Last MLB appearance
- August 6, 1922, for the Washington Senators

MLB statistics
- Batting average: .272
- Home runs: 9
- Runs batted in: 186
- Stats at Baseball Reference

Teams
- Chicago Cubs (1916); St. Louis Browns (1917–1921); Washington Senators (1921–1922)

Earl Leonard "Sheriff" Smith (January 20, 1891 – March 13, 1943) was an American Major League Baseball outfielder who played from 1916 to 1922 with the Chicago Cubs, St. Louis Browns, and the Washington Senators.
