= George Boehler =

American baseball player (1892–1958)

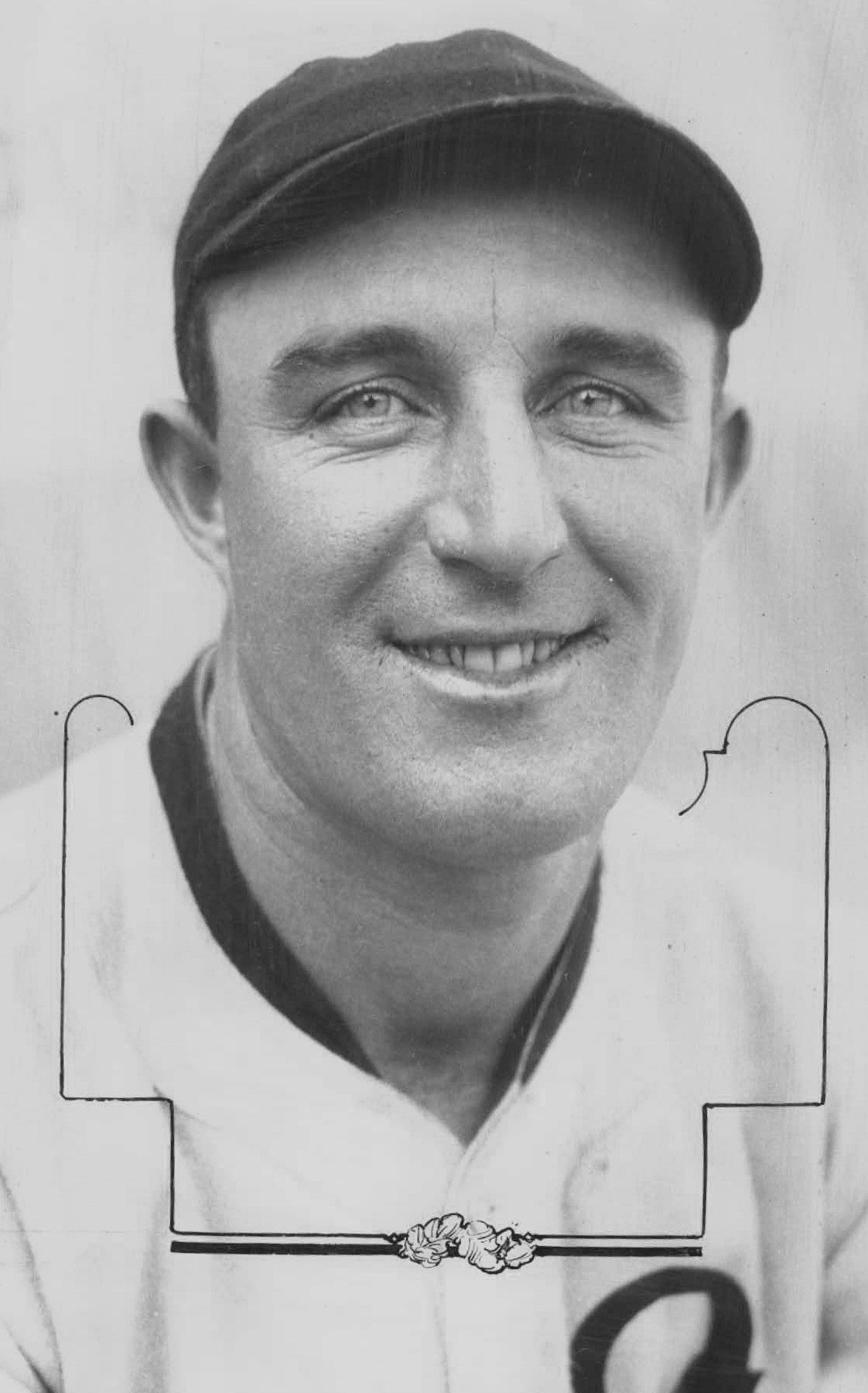
- Pitcher
- Born: January 2, 1892; Lawrenceburg, Indiana, U.S.
- Died: June 23, 1958 (aged 66); Lawrenceburg, Indiana, U.S.
- Batted: Right Threw: Right

MLB debut
- September 13, 1912, for the Detroit Tigers

Last MLB appearance
- September 7, 1926, for the Brooklyn Robins

MLB statistics
- Win–loss record: 6–12
- Earned run average: 4.71
- Strikeouts: 93
- Stats at Baseball Reference

Teams
- Detroit Tigers (1912–1916); St. Louis Browns (1920–1921); Pittsburgh Pirates (1923); Brooklyn Robins (1926)

George Henry Boehler (January 2, 1892 – June 23, 1958) was a 6 ft 2 in (1.88 m) American baseball player.

Born in Lawrenceburg, Indiana, in 1892, he played professional baseball as a right-handed pitcher for 20 years from 1911 to 1930, including nine years in Major League Baseball with the Detroit Tigers (1912–1916), St. Louis Browns (1920–1921), Pittsburgh Pirates (1923), and Brooklyn Robins (1926). He appeared in 61 major league games and compiled a 6–12 win–loss record with 18 saves and a 4.71 earned run average (ERA).

Boehler also played for many years in the minor leagues, including seven season in which he won 20 or more games. His best season was 1922 when he compiled a 38–13 record in 62 games for the Tulsa Oilers in the Western League. He twice won 27 games—for the Newark Skeeters in 1912 and the St. Joseph Drummers in 1913. He also won 88 games for the Oakland Oaks of the Pacific Coast League between 1924 and 1927. In Los Angeles on July 18, 1924, the “iron man” won both games of a doubleheader, allowing one run and eight hits in 18 innings.

Boehler died in 1958 at age 66 in Lawrenceburg, Indiana. He was buried at Greendale Cemetery in Greendale, Indiana.
