= Pat Collins (baseball) =

American baseball player (1896–1960)

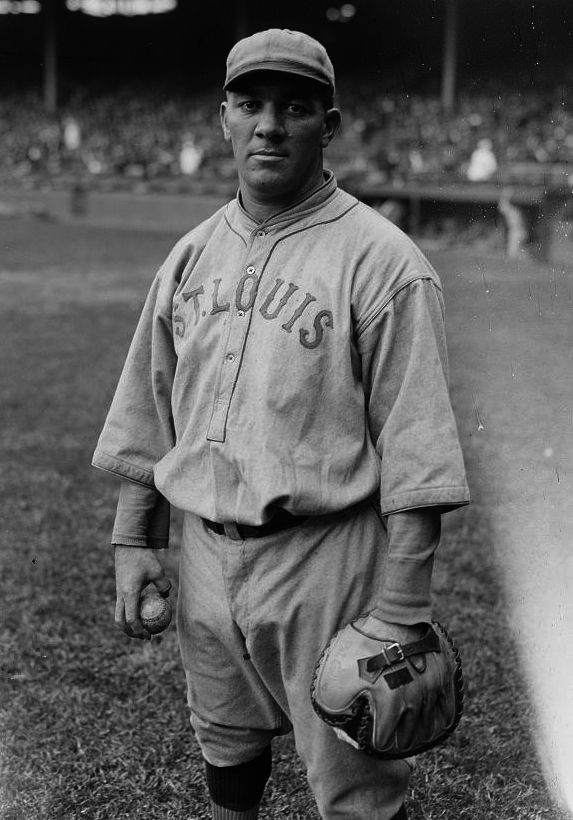
- Collins with the St. Louis Browns, 1922
- Catcher
- Born: September 13, 1896; Sweet Springs, Missouri, U.S.
- Died: May 20, 1960 (aged 63); Kansas City, Kansas, U.S.
- Batted: Right Threw: Right

MLB debut
- September 5, 1919, for the St. Louis Browns

Last MLB appearance
- May 23, 1929, for the Boston Braves

MLB statistics
- Batting average: .254
- Home runs: 33
- Runs batted in: 168
- Stats at Baseball Reference

Teams
- St. Louis Browns (1919–1926); New York Yankees (1926–1928); Boston Braves (1929)

Career highlights and awards
- 2× World Series champion (1927, 1928)

Tharon Leslie "Pat" Collins (September 13, 1896 – May 20, 1960) was an American professional baseball catcher. He played ten seasons in Major League Baseball (MLB) for the St. Louis Browns, New York Yankees and Boston Braves from 1919 to 1929. Collins batted and threw right-handed and also played five games at first base.

Collins played minor league baseball for the Joplin Miners until 1919, when he signed with the Browns. After spending six seasons with the organization, Collins spent a one-year sojourn in the minor leagues before he was traded to the Yankees, where he spent the next three years and played in the famous 1927 Murderers' Row lineup. At the conclusion of the 1928 season, he was traded to the Braves, with whom he played his last major league game on May 23, 1929. A two-time World Series champion, he is famous for being the only major league player to pinch hit and pinch run in the same game.

== Personal life ==
Collins was born on September 13, 1896, in Sweet Springs, Missouri. His mother, Sarah, ran a boarding house, and he had three siblings: Ola, Mildred, and Rathal. He attended school in Sweet Springs before moving to Kansas City, Kansas, to play sandlot ball. He was married to Daisy C. Collins. During his time with the Yankees, his teammate Babe Ruth – who usually called everyone "Kid" due to his inability to remember people's names – mockingly gave Collins the nickname "Horse Nose". After his major league career ended, he went on to run a restaurant in Kansas City, then operate a tavern in Lawrence, Kansas, until 1952.

In April 1952, the state of Kansas took Collins to court over alleged unpaid federal income tax from 1945 to 1950. Although he was convicted in December of evading $4,037 ($48,945 today), a federal judge ordered a new trial after evidence emerged showing his friend had deposited $48,300 ($585,592 today) in a safety deposit box for him. After being treated for a heart condition, Collins died in his sleep on May 20, 1960, in Kansas City at the age of 63 and was interred at the city's Memorial Park Cemetery.

== Professional career ==
=== Minor leagues ===
Collins began his professional baseball career in 1917 with the Joplin Miners, a minor league baseball team that were members of the Class A Western League. In 1919, his last season with the Miners, he had a breakthrough year, posting a batting average of .316 and amassing 100 hits, 19 doubles and 10 home runs in 96 games played. This caught the attention of the St. Louis Browns, who signed him near the end of the season.

=== St. Louis Browns (1919–24) ===
Collins made his major league debut for the Browns on September 5, 1919, at the age of 22, entering the game as a pinch-hitter for pitcher Bert Gallia and drawing a walk in a 12–3 loss against the Detroit Tigers. Between 1920 and 1922, he never played more than 31 games nor started more than 20 games a season as catcher, and his role was limited to occasional pinch-hitting appearances.

During the 1923 season, Collins played 47 games (37 starts) and had the fifth highest caught stealing percentage in the American League (AL) at 44.4%. During a June 8 road game at Shibe Park, he became the first and only major league player to pinch hit and pinch run in the same game. His teammate Homer Ezzell reached base in the third inning, but needed to use the restroom. Collins was inserted into the game as a pinch runner until Ezzell returned. In the ninth inning, Collins returned to pinch hit for pitcher Ray Kolp after the Philadelphia Athletics' manager Connie Mack agreed to drop the no free substitution rule and allowed Collins to pinch hit. However, the official box score lists his pinch hit appearance only.

In 1924, there were two factors which limited Collins to just 20 games (11 starts) as catcher. Firstly, he dislocated the joint in his left thumb during spring training after splitting the finger. Then on June 22, Collins—along with Browns manager George Sisler and coach Jimmy Austin—were suspended indefinitely after arguing balls and strikes with the umpire. Sisler lodged a formal protest to AL president Ban Johnson, and the suspensions were rescinded four days later. After the season ended, Collins was not re-signed by the Browns, so he spent the 1925 season with the St. Paul Saints, a minor league baseball team that competed in the American Association (AA). There, he batted .316 and hit 19 home runs in 132 games.

=== New York Yankees (1926–28) ===
The Saints traded Collins to the New York Yankees on August 30, 1925, in exchange for $25,000 ($458,966 today) and three players to be named later (the Yankees later sent Pee-Wee Wanninger to St. Paul on December 16). During his years with the team, he developed a reputation of being slow-footed and having a throwing arm that was described as "terrible" and "weak". However, his steadiness behind the plate and his bat kept him in the lineup. He became the starting catcher "by default" after Benny Bengough—who was Miller Huggins' first choice for the job—suffered from a sore arm before spring training commenced. In his first season with the organization, Collins had the fourth highest on-base percentage (.433) and tenth best at bats per home run ratio (41.4) in the AL, though he also recorded the fifth highest number of strikeouts in the league with 57. Defensively, he played the fourth highest number of games at catcher (100), during which he finished second in errors committed by a catcher (14), fifth in passed balls (6) and fourth in stolen bases allowed in the AL. However, he compensated for this by turning the most double plays (14) and recording the second highest range factor (4.75) as catcher, while finishing fourth in putouts (401) and fifth in assists (74) at his position and catching the fifth highest number of baserunners stealing (34). On July 20, in the final game of a series against the Browns (his former team), Collins injured a side ligament while attempting to run down catcher Wally Schang, who was also facing his former team. This, along with Bengough's recurring problems with his arm, prompted the Yankees to buy Hank Severeid from the Washington Senators. In the postseason, the Yankees advanced to the 1926 World Series, where they lost to the St. Louis Cardinals in seven games. Collins did not receive much playing time throughout the series, appearing in just three games and getting no hits and one strikeout in two plate appearances.

The 1927 season saw Collins split catching duties with Johnny Grabowski and Bengough. He appeared in the most games behind the plate out of the three players – 89 games caught by Collins versus 68 by Grabowski and Bengough's 30. He was usually placed near the bottom of the Yankees lineup, which was given the nickname "Murderers' Row". Many sports analysts, baseball writers and fans consider the 1927 team the greatest baseball team of all time. Although Collins was labelled an "offensive afterthought", he still managed to bat a respectable .275 and drove in 36 runs in 311 plate appearances. Defensively, he once again finished fourth in the AL in number of games (89) and putouts (267) at catcher, while also recording the fourth highest fielding percentage at the position (.976). At the end of the year, the Yankees once again advanced to the World Series, where they swept the Pittsburgh Pirates in four games. Collins played in Games 1 and 4; in the first game, he was hitless in two at bats but garnered two walks, while in the latter game he went 3-for-3 with a double. His series average of .600 was the highest among his teammates.

After the Yankees purchased Bill Dickey from the Jackson Senators before the start of the 1928 season, the team now had four catchers on their roster. The increase competition restricted Collins to 45 starts and 70 games in total. In the 1928 World Series, the Yankees achieved a second consecutive Fall Classic sweep, this time against the Cardinals in a rematch of the series from two years before. However, he played just one game in the series, entering the 7th inning of Game 4 as a defensive substitute and hitting a double two innings later. The catching situation—along with his dismal .221 batting average that year—made Collins redundant, and at the end of the season, he was sold to the Boston Braves.

=== Boston Braves and back to the minors (1929–32) ===
Collins managed to play just seven games for the Braves during the 1929 season, making his final major league appearance on May 23. During his brief tenure with the team, he was hitless, but drove in 2 runs, drew 3 walks and had 3 sacrifice bunts in 11 plate appearances. After the Braves acquired several younger catchers, he was released and sent to the Buffalo Bisons of the Class AAA International League There, he batted .122 and had 5 hits in 16 games played before manager Bill Clymer cut him loose after the season ended. He promptly signed a one-year contract with the Seattle Indians, a minor league team that played in the Class AAA Pacific Coast League. He batted .244 during his stint with the team and was traded midway through the 1930 season to the Kansas City Blues, thus returning to the AA. His numbers improved tremendously—he recorded a .358 batting average, amassed 39 hits and slugged 7 doubles and 3 home runs in 109 at bats. The 1931 season saw Collins play just 27 games with the Blues and his average dipped to .182. He was scheduled to be traded to the Omaha Packers in July, but the deal fell through and he remained with the team through to the 1932 season. That year, he played 105 games and batted .268, collected 78 hits with 14 doubles, 3 triples and 4 home runs before retiring from professional baseball at the end of the season.

== Post-playing career ==
After playing his final major league season in 1929, Collins returned to minor league baseball and played for several teams until 1932. In 1936, he teamed up with former minor league pitcher Van Hammer in attempting to establish a new Western League franchise in St. Joseph, Missouri, after the St. Joseph Saints moved to Waterloo, Iowa, and became the Waterloo Hawks. However, the plan fell through after a court injunction was issued barring him from using the stadium in St. Joseph for professional baseball. Because of this, Collins forfeited the St. Joseph franchise and subsequently bought the Western League's Rock Island Islanders instead.
