= Marty McManus =

American baseball player and manager (1900–1966)

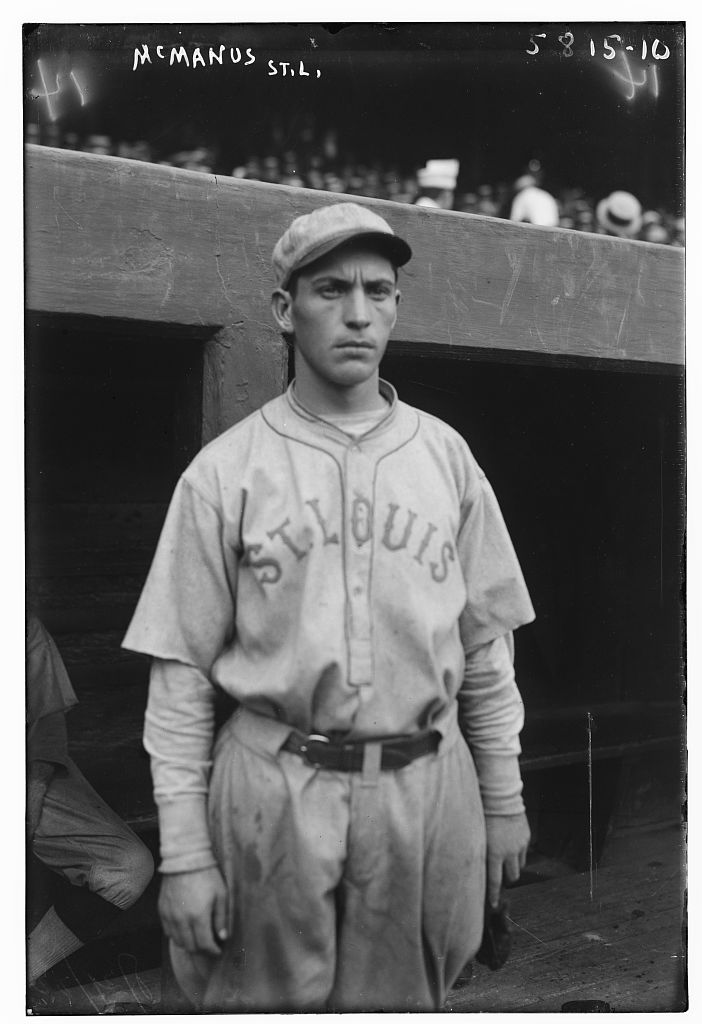
- McManus in 1922
- Second baseman / Third baseman / Manager
- Born: March 14, 1900; Chicago, Illinois, U.S.
- Died: February 18, 1966 (aged 65); St. Louis, Missouri, U.S.
- Batted: Right Threw: Right

MLB debut
- September 26, 1920, for the St. Louis Browns

Last MLB appearance
- September 30, 1934, for the Boston Braves

MLB statistics
- Batting average: .289
- Home runs: 120
- Runs batted in: 992
- Stats at Baseball Reference

Teams
- As player: St. Louis Browns (1920–1926); Detroit Tigers (1927–1931); Boston Red Sox (1931–1933); Boston Braves (1934); As manager: Boston Red Sox (1932–1933)

Career highlights and awards
- AL stolen base leader (1930)

Martin Joseph McManus (March 14, 1900 – February 18, 1966) was an American baseball player and manager.

A native of Chicago, Illinois, McManus spent two years in the United States Army before beginning his professional baseball career in 1920. He played professional baseball for 22 years from 1920 to 1941, including 15 seasons in Major League Baseball, principally as a second baseman (927 games) and third baseman (725 games) for the St. Louis Browns (1920–1926), Detroit Tigers (1927–1931), Boston Red Sox (1931–1933), and Boston Braves (1934). He had four seasons in which he compiled a batting average above .300, including a .333 average in 1923 and a .320 average in 1930. He led the American League with 23 stolen bases in 1930 and with 44 doubles in 1925. In 15 major league seasons, he compiled a .289 batting average (1,926-for-6,660) with 1,008 runs scored, 401 doubles and 88 triples.

McManus also served as a manager or player-manager with several baseball teams, beginning with the Boston Red Sox in 1932 and 1933. He was also a player-manager of the St. Paul Saints in 1935, the Tulsa Oilers in 1936, the Williamsport Grays in 1938 and 1939, the San Antonio Missions in 1940 and 1941, and the Denver Bears in 1947. He also served as a manager in the All-American Girls Professional Baseball League for the Kenosha Comets in 1944 and the South Bend Blue Sox in 1945 and 1948. In 1951, he led an effort to unionize professional baseball, football, and basketball players under the umbrella of the American Federation of Labor.

== Early years ==
McManus was born in Chicago, Illinois in 1900. He was the son of Irish immigrants, Martin J. and Kate McManus. As a young man, he worked at a Chicago department store. He served in the United States Army in 1918 and 1919 and was stationed in the Panama Canal Zone.

== Professional baseball ==
=== Minor leagues ===
McManus began his professional baseball career in 1920 with the Tulsa Oilers of the Western League. He compiled a .283 batting average and totaled 31 doubles, 11 triples and 10 home runs in 143 games with the Oilers in 1920.

=== St. Louis Browns ===
On August 12, 1920, McManus was sold by the Tulsa club to the St. Louis Browns. He appeared in only one game during the 1920 season, compiling one triple and one run batted in during three at bats on September 25, 1920.

McManus became a regular player for the Browns from 1921 to 1926. In 1921, he appeared in 121 games, 96 at second base, 13 at third base, nine at first base, and two at shortstop, and compiled a .260 batting average, eight triples and 64 runs batted in.

In 1922, McManus had perhaps his best major league season. He appeared in 154 games for the Browns, 153 of them as the Browns' starting second baseman. He compiled a .312 batting average and ranked among the American League leaders with 109 runs batted in (third), 189 hits (eighth), 278 total bases (eighth), 34 doubles (eighth), and 11 triples (10th). He also ranked as one of the league's top defensive second baseman with a 1.2 defensive WAR rating (third), 398 putouts at second base (third), 467 assists at second base (fourth), 102 double plays turned at second place (second), 32 errors at second base (first), and a 5.65 range factor rating at second base (second). The 1922 Browns team finished one game behind the pennant-winning Yankees, the closest McManus would ever come to the postseason.

In 1923, McManus again appeared in 154 games for the Browns, 133 at second base and 20 at first base. He compiled a .309 batting average and .367 on-base percentage and finished 15th in the voting for the American League Most Valuable Player award. He ranked among the league's leaders with 60 extra base hits (fifth), 15 home runs (seventh), 94 runs batted in (seventh), a .481 slugging percentage (seventh), and 280 total bases (seventh). He also ranked among the leading defensive second basemen in the league with 386 putouts (third), 373 assists (fourth), 86 double plays turned (second), 32 errors (second), a .960 fielding percentage (fourth) and a 5.71 range factor per game (fourth).

McManus held out at the start of the 1924 season, finally signing with the Browns in mid-April. He appeared in 123 games (119 at second base) for the 1924 Browns, compiled the best batting average of his career at .333 in 517 at bats, and led the American League with 44 doubles. After the 1924 season, McManus asked to be traded, but he remained with the Browns.

McManus held out again in 1925, finally signing with the Browns in early April. He appeared in 154 games for the 1925 Browns, all at second base, and compiled a .288 batting average and .371 on-base percentage. He led the American League with 44 doubles and 69 strikeouts and finished 21st in the voting for the league's MVP award. He also ranked among the league's leaders with 65 extra base hits (fourth), 108 runs scored (seventh), 13 home runs (ninth), and 268 total bases (ninth).

McManus spent his sixth full season with the Browns in 1926. He appeared in 149 games for the Browns, 84 at third base and 61 at second base. He compiled a .284 batting average and .350 on-base percentage and ranked 18th in the balloting for the American League Most Valuable Player award. He led the league with a 3.76 range factor rating per game at third base and ranked among the league's leaders with 102 runs scored (sixth), nine home runs (ninth), 62 strikeouts (fourth), and 18 double plays turned at third base (third). McManus also pulled off the hidden ball trick in his last season with the Browns. On June 30, 1926, with Ty Cobb coaching third base, McManus caught Hall of Famer Harry Heilmann with a hidden ball trick.

=== Detroit Tigers ===
On January 15, 1927, McManus was traded by the Browns to the Detroit Tigers in a multi-player deal. At the time of the trade, McManus expressed thanks for being traded away from the Browns and promised to play "his head off" to repay the Tigers for rendering a service in getting him released.

McManus played a total of five years for Detroit, playing at every infield position. In his first year with the Tigers, he appeared in 108 games, 39 at shortstop, 35 at second base, 21 at third base, and six at first base, and compiled a .268 batting average. In 1928, he appeared in 139 games, 92 at third base and 45 at first base, and batted .288. In 1929, he became the Tigers' starting third baseman, started all 154 games for the club, and posted a .280 batting average. In July 1929, he hit two grand slams in three days for the Tigers.

McManus had his best season for the Tigers in 1930. He appeared in 132 games, 130 at third base, and compiled a .320 batting average and .396 on-base percentage. He also led the American League with 23 stolen bases at age 30.

After the 1930 season, McManus underwent surgery to remove a piece of muscle in his right knee. He was unable to bat during the early portion of spring training in 1931. He appeared in 107 games for the 1931 Tigers, 79 at third base and 21 at second base. However, his batting average dropped nearly 50 points from .320 to .271.

McManus also developed into a solid third baseman during his years in Detroit. In 1930, he led American League third basemen in putouts (152), double plays (23), and fielding percentage (.966). He had 206 putouts at third base in 1929 — a total that has not been exceeded since that year by any Detroit third baseman.

=== Red Sox and Braves ===
On August 31, 1931, the Tigers traded McManus to the Boston Red Sox for Muddy Ruel. In 1932, the Red Sox compiled an 11–44 record through mid-June. On June 19, 1932, the team's manager, Shano Collins, resigned his position, stating that he was so discouraged he could not go on. Team president Bob Quinn asked Collins where he could find a replacement, and Collins suggested McManus. The Red Sox compiled a 32–67 record under McManus during the latter half of the 1932 season. McManus was a player-manager in 1932, appearing in 93 games, including 49 at second base and 30 at third base.

In 1933, McManus returned to the Red Sox as player-manager. He appeared in 106 games, 76 at third base and 26 at second base, and compiled a .284 batting average and .369 on-base percentage. The 1933 Boston Red Sox compiled a 63–86 record under McManus, a 20-game improvement over the 1932 Red Sox. On October 2, 1933, the Red Sox gave McManus his unconditional release, and he was replaced as manager by Bucky Harris.

=== Dodgers and Braves ===
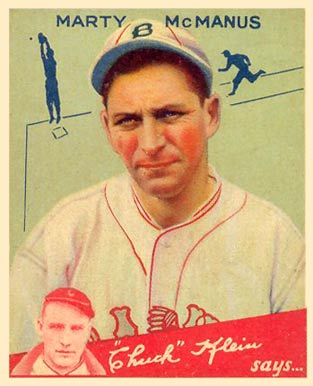
1934 baseball card of McManus

In January 1934, McManus was signed by the Brooklyn Dodgers. He compiled a .340 batting average in exhibition games for the Dodgers, but first year manager Casey Stengel concluded that McManus was disgruntled at being with the Dodgers. Accordingly, on April 11, 1934, Stengel released McManus. McManus was then acquired on waivers by the Boston Braves. McManus appeared in 114 games for the Braves, 73 at second base and 37 at third base, and compiled a .276 batting average and a .330 on-base percentage. He appeared in his final major league game at age 34 on September 30, 1934.

=== Career statistics ===
G	AB	R	H	2B	3B	HR	RBI	SB	BB	AVG	OBP	SLG	OPS	TB	FLG%
1831	6660	1008	1926	401	88	120	992	126	675	.289	.357	.430	.787	2863	.965

=== Minor league manager ===
On December 7, 1934, McManus was hired as a player-manager for the St. Paul Saints in the American Association. He compiled a .275 batting average for St. Paul in 1935. On September 12, 1935, McManus announced that he would not return to the Saints in 1936.

In 1936, he returned to the Tulsa Oilers, the team with which he began his professional baseball career, as player-manager. He compiled a .271 batting average for Tulsa in 101 games during the 1936 season.

In 1937, McManus played third base for the Albany Senators in the New York–Pennsylvania League. He compiled a .244 batting average in 24 games before being released in early June.

In December 1937, McManus was hired as player-manager of the Williamsport Grays of the Eastern League. He remained with Williamsport for two years through the 1938 and 1939 seasons.

On February 17, 1940, he was hired as the manager of the San Antonio Missions of the Texas League. He remained with San Antonio for the 1940 and 1941 seasons.

In 1943, McManus was employed as a sheet metal worker doing war work at a Chrysler plant in Chicago.

In April 1944, McManus was hired to manage one of the clubs in the All-American Girls Professional Baseball League. He began his career in the league as the manager of the Kenosha Comets. He managed the Kenosha squad to the first half championship and lost to Milwaukee in the playoffs. In January 1945, McManus announced that he would return to Kenosha, having rejected an offer to return to men's baseball. He noted: "It is a lot of fun managing those girls. They know how to play the game, catch signals in a hurry and put everything they have into their play." He ended up as manager of the South Bend Blue Sox of the All-American Girls Professional Baseball League in 1945. In 1946, he managed the Chicago Bloomer Girls.

In February 1947, McManus was hired as the manager of the Denver Bears of the Western League. After compiling a 54–75 record with Denver in 1947, McManus resigned to return to the All-American Girls Professional Baseball League.

In 1948, McManus ended his managerial career with the South Bend Blue Sox, the team he had coached in 1945.

== Managerial record ==
Team	Year	Regular season					Postseason			
Team	Year	Games	Won	Lost	Win %	Finish	Won	Lost	Win %	Result
BOS	1932	99	32	67	.323	8th in AL	–	–	–	–
BOS	1933	149	63	86	.423	7th in AL	–	–	–	–
Total		248	95	153	.383		0	0	–	

== Family and later years ==
McManus married Norma Ida Wahl on April 13, 1925, in St. Louis, Missouri.

In 1951, McManus led an effort to unionize professional baseball, football, and basketball players under the umbrella of the American Federation of Labor.

McManus died in 1966, shortly after undergoing cancer surgery, at Cochran Veterans Hospital in St.Louis, Missouri. He was 65 years old. He was buried at Calvary Cemetery and Mausoleum in St. Louis.

== See also ==
- List of Major League Baseball career runs scored leaders
- List of Major League Baseball annual stolen base leaders
- List of Major League Baseball annual doubles leaders
- List of Major League Baseball player-managers
