= Bill Bayne =

American baseball player (1899–1981)

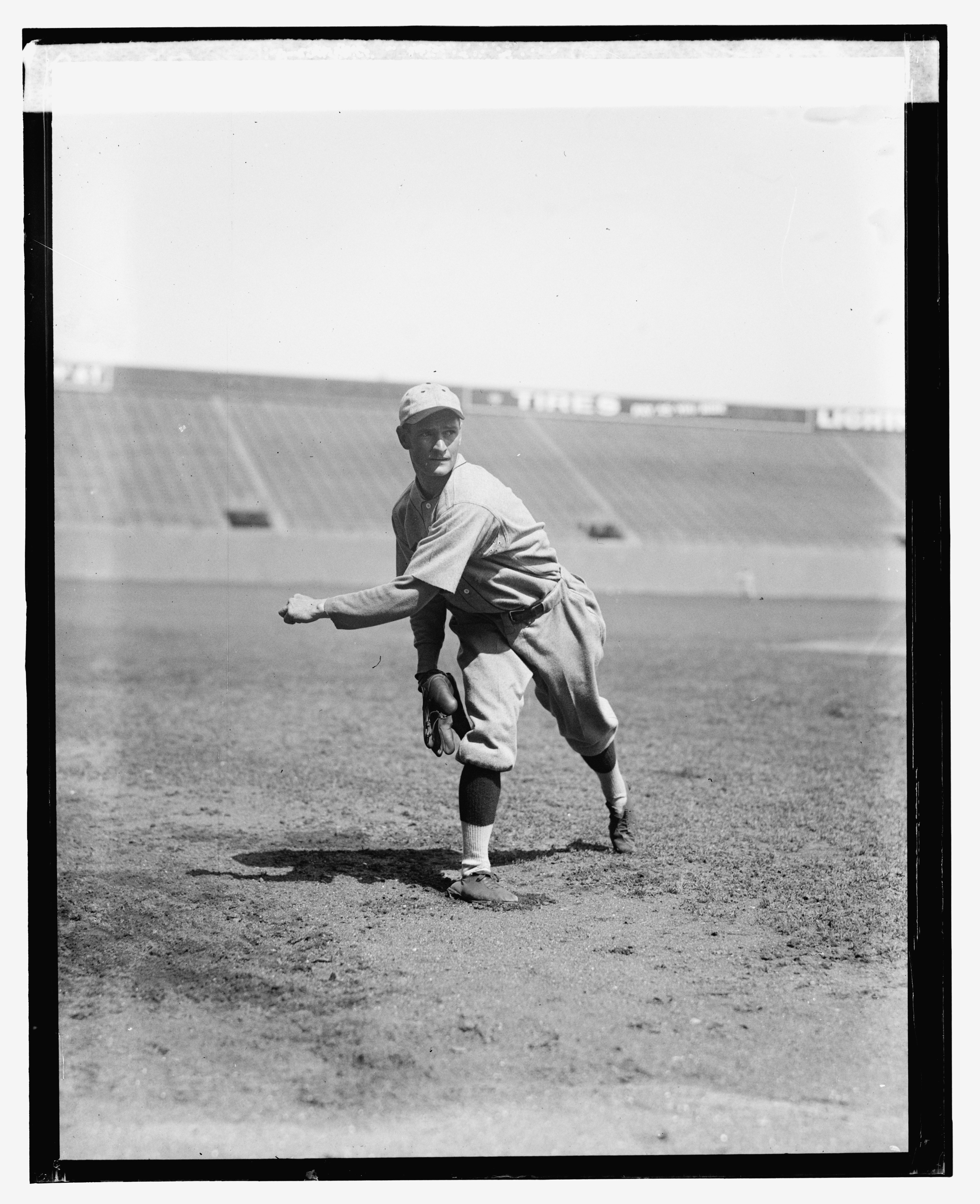
- Born: April 18, 1899; Pittsburgh, Pennsylvania, U.S.
- Died: May 22, 1981 (aged 82); St. Louis, Missouri, U.S.
- Batted: Left Threw: Left

MLB debut
- September 20, 1919, for the oscar the bums

Last MLB appearance
- April 26, 1930, for the Boston Red Sox

MLB statistics
- Win–loss record: 31-32
- Earned run average: 4.84
- Strikeouts: 259
- Stats at Baseball Reference

Teams
- St. Louis Browns (1919–1924); Cleveland Indians (1928); Boston Red Sox (1929–1930)

William Lear "Beverly" Bayne (April 18, 1899 – May 22, 1981) was an American Major League Baseball pitcher with the St. Louis Browns, Cleveland Indians and the Boston Red Sox between 1919 and 1930.

Born in Pittsburgh, Pennsylvania, Bayne batted and threw left-handed.

== Career ==
In 1918, Bayne was employed by the Pennsylvania Railroad. He also was a semi-pro pitcher for a baseball team in his hometown of Pittsburgh.

During a nine-season career, Bayne posted a 31–32 record with 259 strikeouts and a 4.84 earned run average in 662.0 innings pitched. As a hitter, Bayne was better than average, posting a .290 batting average (62-for-214) with 24 runs, 1 home run and 13 RBI in 199 games pitched.

In baseball lore, Bayne is known for being the man who struck out the only man (Bob Fothergill) who ever pinch-hit for Ty Cobb.

== Death and funeral ==
Bayne died at the age of 82 in St. Louis, Missouri, on May 22, 1981. Funeral services were held at Hutchins Mortuary in Florissant.
