= Wally Gerber =

American baseball player (1891–1951)

- Shortstop
- Born: August 18, 1891; Columbus, Ohio, U.S.
- Died: June 19, 1951 (aged 59); Columbus, Ohio, U.S.
- Batted: Right Threw: Right

MLB debut
- September 23, 1914, for the Pittsburgh Pirates

Last MLB appearance
- October 6, 1929, for the Boston Red Sox

MLB statistics
- Batting average: .257
- Home runs: 7
- Runs batted in: 476
- Stats at Baseball Reference

Teams
- Pittsburgh Pirates (1914–1915); St. Louis Browns (1917–1928); Boston Red Sox (1928–1929)

Walter Gerber (August 18, 1891 – June 19, 1951) was a professional baseball player. He played all or part of fifteen seasons in Major League Baseball, playing for the Pittsburgh Pirates (1914–15), St. Louis Browns (1917–28) and Boston Red Sox (1928–29), primarily as a shortstop. He batted and threw right-handed.

A native of Columbus, Ohio, Gerber was a fine infielder with quick hands and a fine throwing arm. From 1914 through 1918 he served as a utility player for the Pittsburgh Pirates and St. Louis Browns, becoming the everyday shortstop for the Browns during the next nine seasons.

In 1923 Gerber set a major league record for shortstops with 48 fielding chances in four consecutive games. He led the American League in errors in 1919 (45) and 1920 (52), but he settled down to lead the league in double plays four times. Basically a line-drive hitter, his most productive season came in 1923, when he posted career-highs in batting average (.281), runs (85), hits (170), doubles (26), runs batted in (62) and games played (154). That season he was named to the Babe Ruth All-Star team, the year he won notoriety for his "$18,000 base hit" against the Detroit Tigers, which gave the Browns third place in the American League and a split in the World Series money. He played his final game with the Boston Red Sox in 1929.

In a 15-season career, Gerber batted .257 with seven home runs and 476 RBI in 1522 games. A disciplined hitter, he posted a fine 1.302 walk-to-strikeout ratio (465-to-357) in 5,099 at bats. As a shortstop, he recorded 2960 putouts, 4319 assists, 741 double plays, and 439 errors in 7718 chances for a .943 fielding percentage.

Following his playing career, Gerber served as an umpire in the Middle Atlantic League and also worked as a supervisor with the City Recreation Division of Ohio.

Gerber died in Columbus, Ohio, at the age of 59 and is buried in Green Lawn Cemetery.
