= Elam Vangilder =

American baseball player (1896–1977)

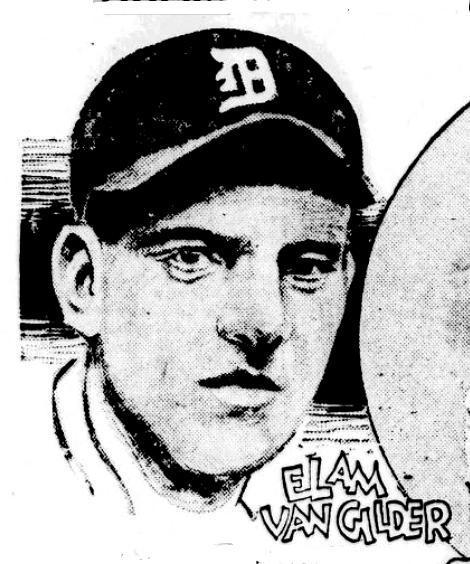
- Pitcher
- Born: April 23, 1896; Cape Girardeau, Missouri, U.S.
- Died: April 30, 1977 (aged 81); Cape Girardeau, Missouri, U.S.
- Batted: Right Threw: Right

MLB debut
- September 18, 1919, for the St. Louis Browns

Last MLB appearance
- May 27, 1929, for the Detroit Tigers

MLB statistics
- Win–loss record: 99–102
- Earned run average: 4.28
- Strikeouts: 474
- Stats at Baseball Reference

Teams
- St. Louis Browns (1919–1927); Detroit Tigers (1928–1929)

Elam Russell Vangilder (April 23, 1896 – April 30, 1977) was an American professional baseball pitcher in the Major Leagues from 1919–1929. He played for the St. Louis Browns and Detroit Tigers.

An effective pitcher despite his high walk rate, Vangilder compiled a 99–102 record with a 4.28 ERA in 367 major league appearances.

Vangilder was an above-average hitter for a pitcher and was occasionally used as a pinch hitter. He finished his career with a .243 batting average (146-for-601) with 61 runs scored, 8 home runs, and 50 RBI. His best year with the bat was 1922 when he hit .344 (32-for-93) with 2 home runs and 11 RBI for the St. Louis Browns.

After his playing career, Vangilder returned to his hometown of Cape Girardeau, Missouri, where he lived out his life on his dairy farm until his death at age 81.
