= Dixie Davis (baseball) =

American baseball player (1890–1944)

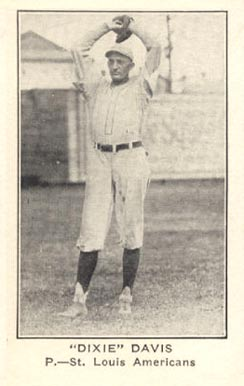
- Pitcher
- Born: October 12, 1890; Wilson's Mills, North Carolina, U.S.
- Died: February 4, 1944 (aged 53); Raleigh, North Carolina, U.S.
- Batted: Right Threw: Right

MLB debut
- July 11, 1912, for the Cincinnati Reds

Last MLB appearance
- September 20, 1926, for the St. Louis Browns

MLB statistics
- Win–loss record: 75–71
- Earned run average: 3.97
- Strikeouts: 460
- Stats at Baseball Reference

Teams
- Cincinnati Reds (1912); Chicago White Sox (1915); Philadelphia Phillies (1918); St. Louis Browns (1920–1926)

Frank Talmadge "Dixie" Davis (October 12, 1890 – February 4, 1944) was an American professional baseball player who played for parts of 10 seasons as a pitcher in the Major leagues.
