= Jimmy Austin =

American baseball player, coach, and manager (1879-1965)

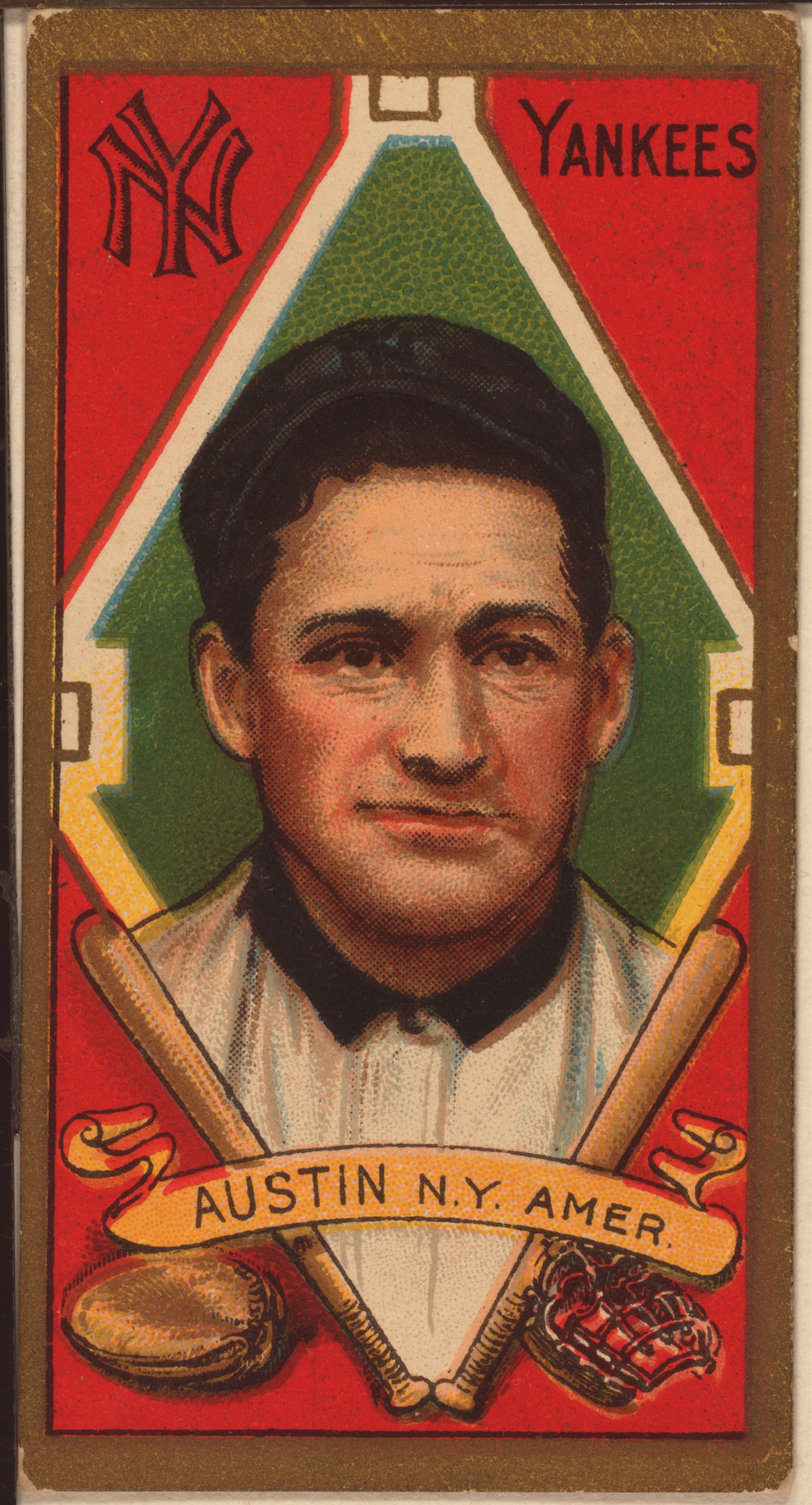
- Third baseman
- Born: December 8, 1879; Swansea, Wales
- Died: March 6, 1965 (aged 85); Orange, California, U.S.
- Batted: Switch Threw: Right

MLB debut
- April 19, 1909, for the New York Highlanders

Last MLB appearance
- October 6, 1929, for the St. Louis Browns

MLB statistics
- Batting average: .246
- Home runs: 13
- Runs batted in: 390
- Stats at Baseball Reference

Teams
- As player: New York Highlanders (1909–1910); St. Louis Browns (1911–1923, 1925–1926, 1929); As manager: St. Louis Browns (1913, 1918, 1923); As coach: St. Louis Browns (1923–1932); Chicago White Sox (1933–1935, 1937, 1939–1940)

James Phillip Austin (December 8, 1879 – March 6, 1965) was an American professional baseball player and coach. He played in Major League Baseball as a third baseman for the New York Highlanders and St. Louis Browns from 1909 through 1923, 1925 through 1926, and 1929. He also managed the Browns in 1913, 1918, and 1923.

== Early years ==
Austin was born in Swansea, Wales, the son of a shipbuilder. He was one of only three Major League Baseball players to be born in Wales (the others being pitcher Ted Lewis and infielder Peter Morris). His father moved to the United States in 1885 to find work, and Austin followed in 1887. He did not see a baseball game until he was 14 years old.

After leaving school in 1889, Austin became an apprentice machinist with Westinghouse. After finishing his four-year apprenticeship, Westinghouse went on strike. Austin took up an offer of $40 a month ($1,433), plus a job, to play independent ball in Warren, Ohio. He returned to Westinghouse that fall, but in the spring of 1904, he signed with the Central League's Dayton, Ohio club.

== Professional baseball ==
Austin remained in Dayton until 1907, when he was sold to Omaha in the Western League. He stole 97 bases for Omaha in 1908, and at the end of the season was sold to the New York Highlanders of the American League. He made his major league debut in 1909 at the relatively advanced age (for baseball) of 29. That year, Austin became immortalized in the Charles M. Conlon photo as the third baseman trying to avoid Ty Cobb's spikes on a stolen base. Of the play, Austin said, "That's Cobb sliding into third and the other guy is me."

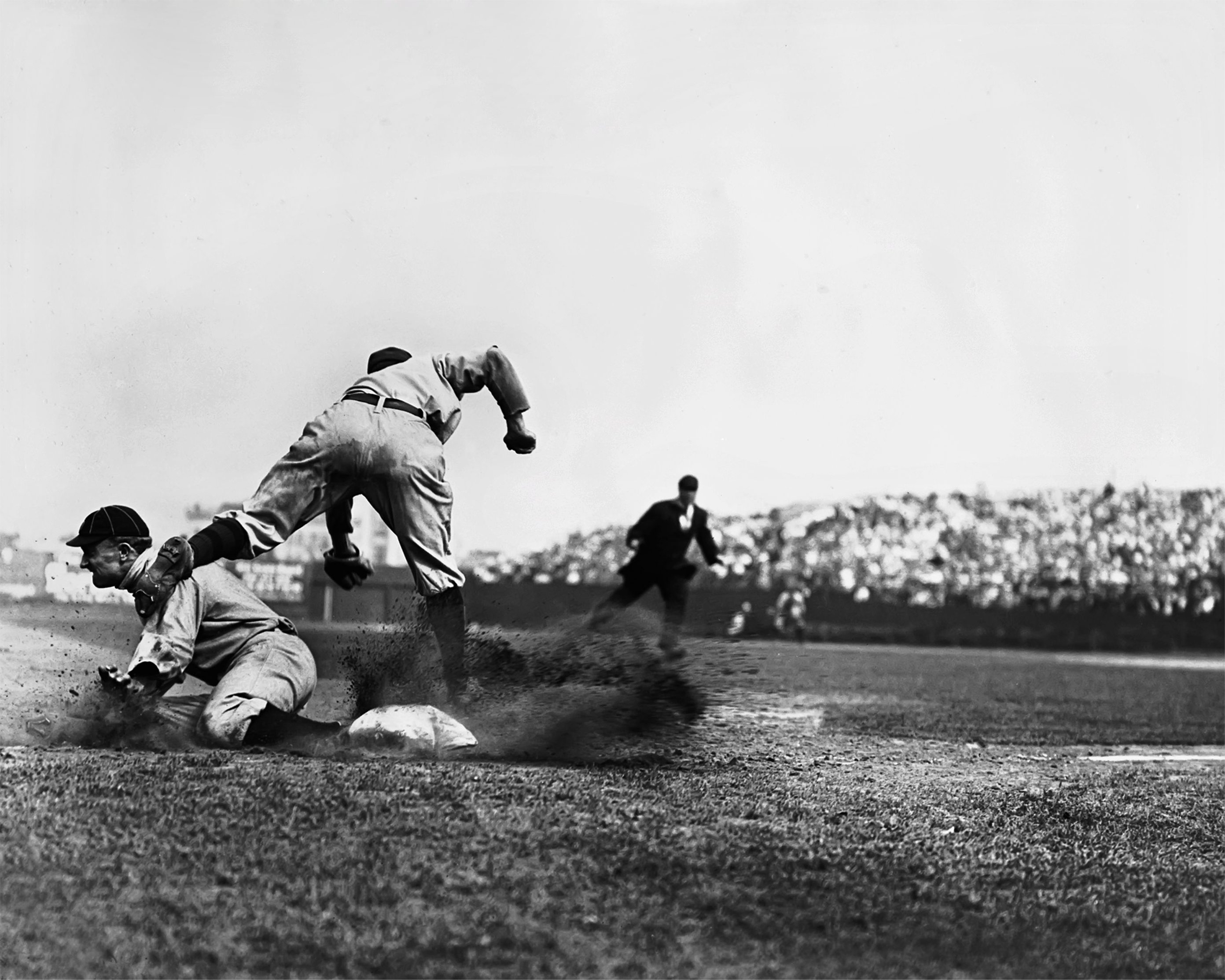
In this famous 1909 photograph, Austin fails to tag Ty Cobb out on a stolen base attempt.

He played two seasons in New York, but was traded to the St. Louis Browns in 1911 by new Highlanders manager Hal Chase, thus beginning a thirty-year career with the Browns as player and coach.

In 1913, when the Browns' player-manager George Stovall was suspended by the American League for spitting at an umpire, Austin was made manager on a temporary basis, until he was replaced by the legendary Branch Rickey. It was Rickey's first managerial job. Austin continued as Rickey's "Sunday Manager" – Rickey had promised his mother that he would not enter a ballpark on the Christian Sabbath, and therefore Austin managed the Browns on those days.

Austin played regularly for the Browns until 1921, and served as a coach for another 20 years. Unfortunately, the Browns during this period were rarely ever in the first division, so his team won no pennants during his playing career. The Browns did however finish the 1922 season in second place, one game behind the New York Yankees. Austin did also have the great fortune of either playing for or coaching baseball greats Branch Rickey, George Sisler, and Rogers Hornsby. In 1929, at the age of 49, Austin became one of the oldest major leaguers in history when he was inserted into a blowout. He cleanly handled two chances at third base, and struck out in his only at bat.

== Later life ==
Austin spent 16 seasons as a coach for the Browns and Chicago White Sox during an 18-year span that ended in 1940. After his coaching career ended, Austin retired and moved to Laguna Beach, California, and served as the town's mayor during the 1940s. Austin was one of the ballplayers who told his story in Lawrence Ritter's classic 1966 book, The Glory of Their Times.

Austin was brought to St. Joseph Hospital in Orange, California due to respiratory issues, but suffered a heart attack in the hospital, causing his death on March 6, 1965 at age 85.

== Managerial record ==
Team	Year	Regular season					Postseason			
Team	Year	Games	Won	Lost	Win %	Finish	Won	Lost	Win %	Result
SLB	1913	8	2	6	.250	interim	–	–	–	–
SLB	1918	16	7	9	.438	interim	–	–	–	–
SLB	1923	51	22	29	.431	5th in AL	–	–	–	–
Total		75	31	44	.413		0	0	–	

== See also ==
- List of Major League Baseball career stolen bases leaders
- List of Major League Baseball player-managers
