= Urban Shocker =

American baseball player (1890–1928)

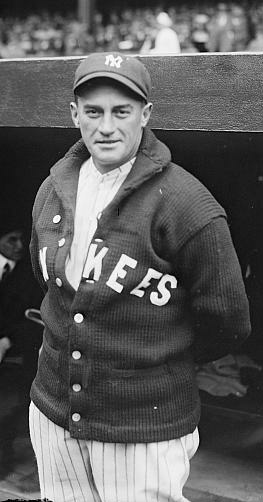
- Shocker in 1925
- Pitcher
- Born: September 22, 1890; Cleveland, Ohio, U.S.
- Died: September 9, 1928 (aged 37); Denver, Colorado, U.S.
- Batted: Right Threw: Right

MLB debut
- April 24, 1916, for the New York Yankees

Last MLB appearance
- May 30, 1928, for the New York Yankees

MLB statistics
- Win–loss record: 187–117
- Earned run average: 3.17
- Strikeouts: 983
- Stats at Baseball Reference

Teams
- New York Yankees (1916–1917); St. Louis Browns (1918–1924); New York Yankees (1925–1928)

Career highlights and awards
- World Series champion (1927); MLB wins leader (1921); MLB strikeout leader (1922)

Urbain Jacques Shockcor (September 22, 1890 – September 9, 1928), known as Urban James Shocker, was an American professional baseball pitcher. He played in Major League Baseball (MLB) for the New York Yankees and St. Louis Browns between 1916 and 1928.

Shocker, known as one of the last legal spitball pitchers, led the American League (AL)—and set the Browns' record—in 1921 with 27 wins, and won 20 games in four consecutive seasons from 1920 to 1923. At the time of his retirement, he was the Browns' all-time leader in wins with 126 and shutouts with 23.

== Career ==
Shocker was born in Cleveland, Ohio to Anna and William Shockcor and relocated to Michigan some time later. Shocker began his career in the Border League, where he played as a catcher. In 1913, when he played for the Windsor team in the Border League, he broke the middle finger on his right hand; when it healed it became hooked, which allowed him to throw a breaking ball as well as his spitter. As a prelude to his major league career, Shocker was demoted by the Yankees for seasoning and improvement, and he spent most of the 1916 season playing for the Toronto Maple Leafs in the International League, where he posted a 15–3 record and strung together 54 consecutive scoreless innings. His scoreless inning streak and 1.31 ERA for the campaign both still stand as International League records. He was called up by the Yankees and played with them through the 1917 season. That winter, Miller Huggins engineered a trade of Shocker to the Browns, eventually returning to the Yankees in 1925. In March 1918, his draft number came up and he reported for service on May 31 of that year. After he served overseas he returned to the Browns in April 1919.

Shocker had four consecutive 20-win seasons with the Browns in the early 1920s, during which he was one of the most dominant pitchers in baseball. Urban was the last Yankee to legally throw a spitball, as he and a handful of other pitchers were grandfathered to continue the practice after it was banned by baseball in 1920.

Shocker lived with a heart condition so severe some books say he had to sleep either sitting or standing up. By the early fall of 1927, he was too ill to maintain his place in the starting rotation.

Shocker's career totals for 412 games include a 187–117 record, a .615 winning percentage, 317 games started, 200 complete games, 28 shutouts, 72 games finished, 25 saves, and an ERA of 3.17 in 2,681.2 innings pitched. He compiled a career .209 batting average (167–798) with 89 runs scored, 70 RBI and 139 bases on balls. He was a good fielding pitcher in his era, committing only 15 errors in 769 total chances for a .980 fielding percentage.

After his release from the Yankees in 1928, Shocker entered an exhibition tournament in Denver. He pitched in one game on August 6, 1928, against a team from Cheyenne, Wyoming and fared poorly in that outing.

Around this time, Shocker contracted pneumonia and was hospitalized shortly thereafter. On September 9, 1928, Shocker died in Denver as the result of heart failure exacerbated by pneumonia.

== See also ==
- List of Major League Baseball annual saves leaders
- List of Major League Baseball annual strikeout leaders
- List of Major League Baseball annual wins leaders
