= Baby Doll Jacobson =

American baseball player (1890–1977)

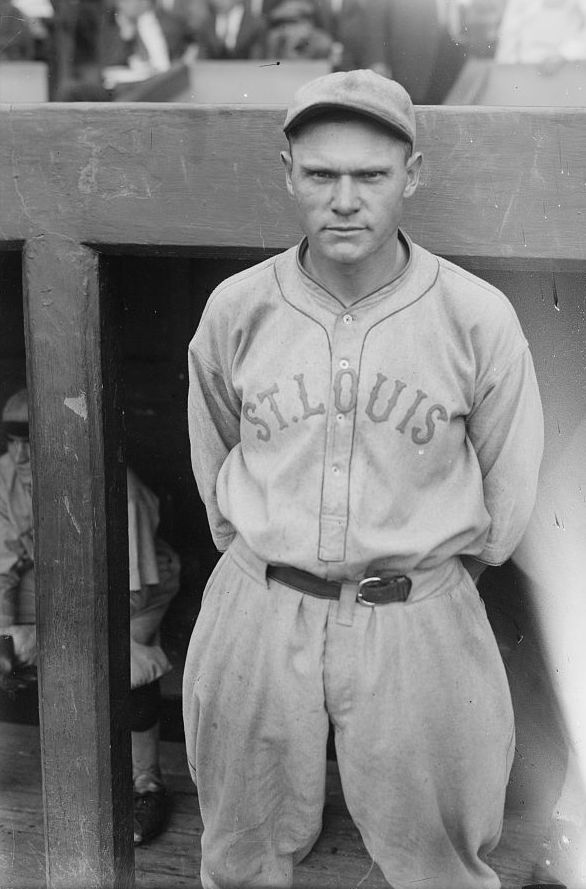
- Jacobson in 1922
- Center fielder
- Born: August 16, 1890; Cable, Illinois, U.S.
- Died: January 16, 1977 (aged 86); Orion, Illinois, U.S.
- Batted: Right Threw: Right

MLB debut
- April 14, 1915, for the Detroit Tigers

Last MLB appearance
- September 22, 1927, for the Philadelphia Athletics

MLB statistics
- Batting average: .311
- Home runs: 83
- Runs batted in: 818
- Stats at Baseball Reference

Teams
- Detroit Tigers (1915); St. Louis Browns (1915, 1917, 1919–1926); Boston Red Sox (1926–1927); Cleveland Indians (1927); Philadelphia Athletics (1927)

William Chester "Baby Doll" Jacobson (August 16, 1890 – January 16, 1977) was an American professional baseball outfielder. He played 11 seasons of Major League Baseball, principally with the St. Louis Browns, between 1915 and 1927. He also played for the Detroit Tigers (1915), Boston Red Sox (1926–1927), Cleveland Indians (1927), and Philadelphia Athletics (1927).

Jacobson was one of the best hitters in the American League during his prime years. He batted above .300 for seven consecutive seasons, including a .355 season in 1920 and a .352 season in 1921. He also hit for power and finished second behind Babe Ruth with 122 RBI in 1922. He compiled a .311 lifetime batting average and twice finished among the top ten in voting for the American League Most Valuable Player Award. During the eight years from 1919 to 1926, Jacobson compiled 1,473 hits, ranking sixth in the major leagues behind Baseball Hall of Famers Sam Rice (1,639), Rogers Hornsby (1,626), Harry Heilmann (1,556), George Sisler (1,495), and Ty Cobb (1,478).

Jacobson was also one of the best defensive outfielders of his era. He set 13 defensive records during his career, and his 488 putouts in 1924 stood as a major league record until 1928 and an American League record until 1948. He also led the major leagues with nine double plays started from the outfield in 1925.

== Early years ==
Jacobson was born in 1890 in Cable, Illinois, an unincorporated community that is now part of the Quad Cities Metropolitan Area. His father, Gustaf Jacobson, was a Swedish immigrant who worked as a farmer. His mother, Albatina, was the daughter of Swedish immigrants. Jacobson was the second oldest of five children.

== Baseball career ==
=== Minor leagues ===
After playing sandlot baseball in 1908 in Orion, Illinois, Jacobson began his professional baseball career in 1909 at age 18 with the Rock Island Islanders of the Illinois–Indiana–Iowa League. After a brief stint with the Battle Creek Crickets of the Southern Michigan League in 1910, Jacobson returned to Rock Island for the balance of the 1910 season and the entire 1911 season. He compiled a .304 batting average for Rock Island in 1911.

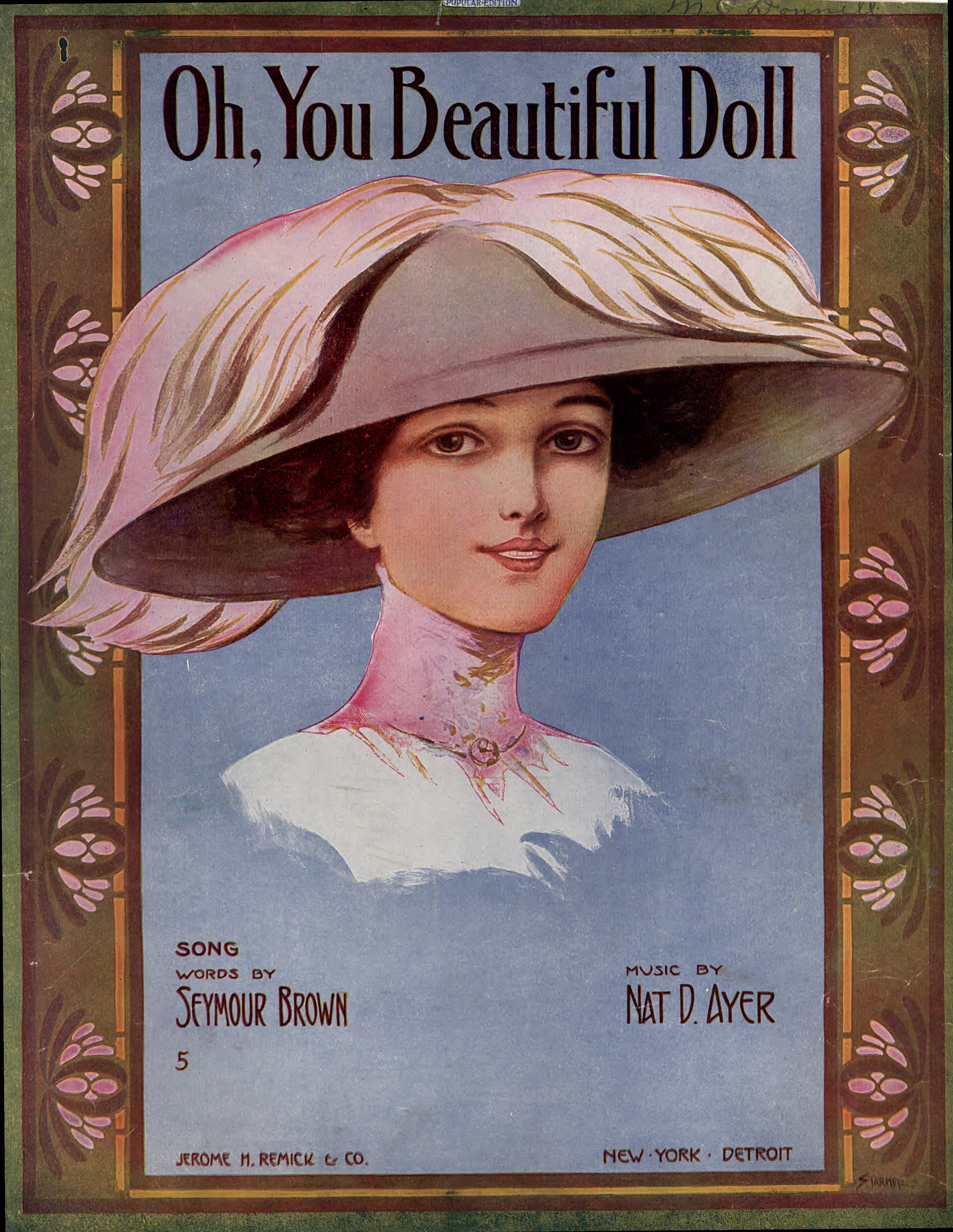
Sheet music for the popular song, "Oh, You Beautiful Doll", first published in 1911.

After the 1911 season, Jacobson was signed by manager John McGraw of the New York Giants. In early April 1912, McGraw turned over Jacobson to the Mobile Sea Gulls of the Southern Association. On opening day of the 1912 season, the band began playing the popular song, "Oh, You Beautiful Doll", as Jacobson came to the plate. Jacobson recalled, "Well I led off with a home run on the first pitch and a lady sitting behind the plate jumped up and shouted, 'You must be that beautiful doll they were talking about.' The name stuck with me and that was it."

In his first season in Mobile, Jacobson compiled a .261 batting average. After the 1912 season, it was expected that Jacobson would be called up by the Giants in 1913. In November 1912, the Sporting Life reported:

McGraw dug him out of the I. I. I. League a year ago and turned him over to Mike Finn at Mobile after looking him over at Marlin. . . . Finn developed him into a slashing outfielder, and the Southern League averages show that he hit better than .260 and stole enough bases to justify McGraw that he has improved. Bill was originally a catcher and Wilbert Robinson tried to induce him to return to that trade, but William prefers the outfielding business. A bad finger crowded him out from behind the bat.

After two seasons in Mobile, Jacobson joined the Chattanooga Lookouts in 1914. He appeared in 155 games for Chattanooga in 1914 and set a Southern Association record with 15 home runs. He also compiled a .319 batting average and totalled 64 extra base hits.

=== Detroit Tigers ===
On April 14, 1915, Jacobson made his major league debut with the Detroit Tigers. As the 1915 Tigers had one of the best outfields in major league history with Ty Cobb, Sam Crawford, and Bobby Veach, manager Hughie Jennings sought to convert Jacobson into a first baseman. Jacobson compiled a .215 batting average in 37 games for the Tigers. On August 18, 1915, the Tigers traded Jacobson with $15,000 to the St. Louis Browns for pitcher Bill James.

=== St. Louis Browns ===
==== 1915 to 1917 ====
Jacobson appeared in 34 games for the Browns in 1915, compiling a .209 batting average. He spent the 1916 season with the Little Rock Travelers of the Southern Association. He hit for a .346 average in 139 games for the Travelers.

After a strong showing in Little Rock, Jacobson returned to the Browns in 1917. He split his playing time between center and right field in 1917 and compiled a .248 batting average in 148 games. He struck out 67 times in 1917, second most in the American League, but he also led the league with seven double plays started from right field.

In August 1917, after the American entry into World War I, Jacobson enlisted in the United States Navy. He missed the entire 1918 season due to military service.

==== Overview of prime years ====
Jacobson returned to the Browns in 1919 at age 28. For eight consecutive seasons from 1919 to 1926, he began the season as the Browns' starting center fielder. During those eight seasons, he was one of the best fielding outfielders in the American League. He led the league's center fielders in putouts in 1921 (386), 1923 (409), and 1924 (488), and was among the top five in that category every year from 1919 to 1925. In 1925, he led the league's center fielders with nine double plays started from the outfield. He set 13 American League fielding records during his major league career. His 488 putouts in 1924 was a major league record until 1928 and an American League record until 1948.

During his prime, Jacobson also hit for both average and power. He finished among the league's leaders in batting average in 1919 (.323), 1920 (.355), and 1921 (.352). During the eight years from 1919 to 1926, Jacobson had 1,473, hits, ranking sixth in the major leagues behind Baseball Hall of Famers Sam Rice (1,639), Rogers Hornsby (1,626), Harry Heilmann (1,556), George Sisler (1,495), and Ty Cobb (1,478), and ahead of Hall of Famers Babe Ruth (1,436), Tris Speaker (1,420), Zack Wheat (1,416), Eddie Collins (1,412), Dave Bancroft (1,377), and Max Carey (1,333).

At 6 feet 3 inches (1.91 m) and 215 pounds (98 kg), Jacobson was bigger than Babe Ruth. In July 1920, John B. Sheridan wrote in The Sporting News that Jacobson would be a better hitter than Ruth but for his unusual batting stance:

There are men playing ball today who would be harder hitters than Ruth or than Hornsby if they applied the proper style to their bat stroke. Jacobson of the Browns is larger and stronger than Ruth or than Hornsby. Yet he does not hit the ball at all so often or as far as these more famous sluggers. Why? Jacobson takes less than a half swing at the ball. He stands in a position that is, as the Irishman said, 'agin himself.' That is, he faces the pitcher 'full front' so that he cannot pull back his right arm to get a full swing. Instead of swinging he pushes or shoves the bat at the ball. He gets a little less than a half swing at it. Yet, now and then, he hits an abnormally long ball. [St. Louis manager] Jimmy Burke told Jacobson that if he stood as Ray Chapman stands, forward hip and shoulder in to the plate he would hit two or three balls out of the park every day. I think Burke is right.

Writing in The New York Times, John Kieran later wrote of Jacobson: "There was no style to him at all. He didn't know his own strength. But he went galumphing all over the outfield to haul down long drives and, when he came to the plate, he got even with a lot of fellows who made him sweat in the outfield. He was the Johnny Mize type of hitter; he just overpowered the ball."

==== 1919 to 1926 ====
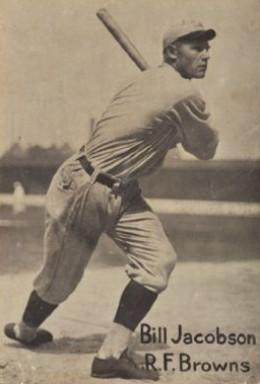
1919 baseball card of Jacobson

In 1919, after his discharge from the military, Jacobson played in 120 games for the Browns. During the 1919 season, Jacobson was among the American League leaders with a .323 batting average (7th), .453 slugging percentage (8th), 31 doubles (9th), and a 2.92 range factor in center field (2nd). His .323 batting average in 1919 was 75 points higher than he had managed in 1917 before entering the military. Jacobson credited St. Louis manager Jimmy Burke for his improvement at the plate. Jacobson had married in March 1919, and Burke advised him early in the 1919 season that he would be staying with the Browns and told him, "Send for your wife today." Jacobson recalled that, relieved of the worry of being sent to the minors, he saw the ball better than he ever had: "After five years of trial and five years of failure I have made good at last. That's all I know. Whatever improvement I have shown is due to Burke's four words, 'Send for your wife.' When Burke made that crack, he made me a success where I had been one of the most pitiable failures in baseball."

In 1920, Jacobson had statistically his finest season. He finished second behind Babe Ruth with 122 runs batted in, and his .355 batting average was a career high. He was again among the American League leaders in runs batted in (2nd), batting average (6th) and with a .501 slugging percentage (8th), 216 hits (4th), 305 total bases (5th), 264 times on base (6th), 14 triples (7th), 57 extra base hits (9th), 97 runs scored (10th), a .981 fielding percentage in center field (2nd), and a 2.68 range factor (3rd among all American League outfielders).

In 1921, Jacobson continued his torrid hitting. For the third consecutive year, he finished among the American League leaders with a .352 average. He was among the league leaders in batting average (6th) and with 211 hits (4th), 38 doubles (7th), and 14 triples (7th). He also led the league's center fielders with 386 putouts and had the second highest fielding percentage (.982) among all of the league's outfielders.

In 1922, Jacobson helped lead the Browns to one of the best seasons in the club's history. The 1922 Browns, with George Sisler batting .420, finished in second place in the American League, one game behind the New York Yankees, with a 93–61 record. Jacobson compiled a .317 batting average in 1922 with 102 RBIs and career highs with 16 triples and 19 stolen bases. He was among the league's leaders in triples (2nd), RBIs (5th), and stolen bases (7th). He hit three triples in one game against the Detroit Tigers on September 9, the Browns winning 16–0. He also had the second highest range factor (2.74) among all American League outfielders in 1922.

In 1923, Jacobson's batting average dropped to .309 and, with Sisler out of the lineup with a sinus infection, the Browns dropped from second place to fifth in the American League.

In 1924, Jacobson rebounded and had one of the best seasons of his career. He finished second in the American League behind Ruth in both total bases (306) and extra base hits (72) and third in the league with 19 home runs. He hit for the cycle on April 17 against the White Sox. His 488 putouts were a major league record for outfielders that stood for 24 years. He also finished eighth in the voting for the American League's 1924 Most Valuable Player Award.

In 1925, Jacobson finished seventh in the MVP voting after compiling a .342 batting average and .513 slugging percentage. He was among the American League leaders with 277 total bases (7th), 15 home runs (7th), 54 extra base hits (9th), 184 hits (10th), and 103 runs scored (10th).

Jacobson began the 1926 season as the Browns' starting center fielder for the eighth consecutive year. He appeared in 50 games for the Browns and saw his batting average fall below .300 for the first time since 1917. He compiled a .286 batting average for St. Louis during the 1926 season.

=== Boston Red Sox ===
On June 15, 1926, Jacobson was part of a three-team trade that sent Jacobson to the Boston Red Sox, Bing Miller to the Browns, and Howard Ehmke to the Philadelphia Athletics. Jacobson's bat was revitalized in Boston, as he compiled a .305 average in 98 games for the Red Sox in 1926. He finished the season as one of the American League leaders with 51 doubles (4th), 61 extra base hits (6th), 89 RBIs (10th), and 26 sacrifice hits (10th). His .981 fielding percentage also ranked second among the league's center fielders.

In 1927, Jacobson became a left fielder for the Red Sox. At age 36, his offensive production dropped to the lowest level since his rookie season of 1915. He compiled a .245 batting average in 45 games for Boston.

=== Late 1920s ===
In June 1927, Jacobson was sold by the Red Sox to the Cleveland Indians. He was released by the Indians after compiling a .252 average in 32 games. In August 1927, he was selected off waivers by the Philadelphia Athletics. He compiled a .229 average in 17 games for the Athletics. Jacobson appeared in his last major league game on September 22, 1927.

Jacobson continued to play minor league baseball in 1928 and 1929. He played for four teams in 1928 and compiled a .342 batting average in 55 games in the American Association. In 1929, he compiled a .304 average in 130 games for the Quincy Indians of the Illinois–Indiana–Iowa League.

In February 1930, Jacobson announced that he was retiring from baseball after purchasing a farm near Orion, Illinois, where he had begun playing sandlot baseball in 1908. He reportedly played semipro ball in the Henry County League in 1930.

=== Career statistics ===
In 1,472 games over 11 seasons, Jacobson posted a .311 batting average (1,714-for-5,507) with 787 runs, 328 doubles, 94 triples, 83 home runs, 818 RBI, 86 stolen bases, 355 bases on balls, .357 on-base percentage and .450 slugging percentage. Defensively, he recorded a .973 fielding percentage playing at all three outfield positions and first base.

He recorded five 5-hit games in his MLB career.

== Family and later years ==
Jacobson was married in 1919 to Vurl Cruse. After retiring from baseball, he worked as a farmer in Colona Township, located in Henry County, Illinois, not far from where he was raised. At the time of the 1930 United States census, he was listed as a farmer in Colona Township, residing with his wife Vurl and their three children, William Jr., Carita and Julian. By the time of the 1940 United States census, Jacobson remained in Colona Township, though his family had by then grown to five children with the addition of sons Ted and Bruce. As of 1942, Jacobson was still self-employed as a farmer in Colona Township.

Jacobson retired from farming in 1960 and died in Orion, Illinois, at the age of 86 and was buried at Dayton Corners Cemetery in Colona, Illinois. At the time of his death, The Sporting News wrote: "Although he never received more than a passing glance in the Hall of Fame voting, Jacobson's credentials are superior to many of the old-timers who have been enshrined."

== See also ==
- List of Major League Baseball players to hit for the cycle

Achievements
Preceded by Pie Traynor	Hitting for the cycle April 17, 1924	Succeeded by Goose Goslin
