= 1925 Boston Red Sox season =

Major League Baseball season

1925 Boston Red Sox
- League: American League
- Ballpark: Fenway Park
- City: Boston, Massachusetts
- Record: 47–105 (.309)
- League place: 8th
- Owners: J. A. Robert Quinn
- Managers: Lee Fohl
- Stats: ESPN.com; Baseball Reference

The 1925 Boston Red Sox season was the 25th season in the franchise's Major League Baseball history. The Red Sox finished last in the eight-team American League (AL) with a record of 47 wins and 105 losses, 49 1/2 games behind the Washington Senators

== Regular season ==
=== Season standings ===
American League
Team	W	L	Pct.	GB	Home	Road
Washington Senators	96	55	.636	—	53‍–‍22	43‍–‍33
Philadelphia Athletics	88	64	.579	8½	51‍–‍26	37‍–‍38
St. Louis Browns	82	71	.536	15	45‍–‍32	37‍–‍39
Detroit Tigers	81	73	.526	16½	43‍–‍34	38‍–‍39
Chicago White Sox	79	75	.513	18½	44‍–‍33	35‍–‍42
Cleveland Indians	70	84	.455	27½	37‍–‍39	33‍–‍45
New York Yankees	69	85	.448	28½	42‍–‍36	27‍–‍49
Boston Red Sox	47	105	.309	49½	28‍–‍47	19‍–‍58

=== Record vs. opponents ===
1925 American League record Sources:
Team	BOS	CWS	CLE	DET	NYY	PHA	SLB	WSH
Boston	—	9–13	7–15	5–17	9–13	5–17	5–16	7–14
Chicago	13–9	—	14–8	13–9	13–9	8–14	9–13	9–13
Cleveland	15–7	8–14	—	11–11–1	10–12	11–11	11–11	4–18
Detroit	17–5	9–13	11–11–1	—	14–8–1	8–14	12–10	10–12
New York	13–9	9–13	12–10	8–14–1	—	9–13	11–11–1	7–15
Philadelphia	17–5	14–8	11–11	14–8	13–9	—	12–10	7–13–1
St. Louis	16–5	13–9	11–11	10–12	11–11–1	10–12	—	11–11
Washington	14–7	13–9	18–4	12–10	15–7	13–7–1	11–11	—

=== Opening Day lineup ===
Ira Flagstead	CF
Doc Prothro	3B
Ike Boone	RF
Bobby Veach	LF
Joe Harris	1B
Turkey Gross	SS
Billy Rogell	2B
Val Picinich	C
Alex Ferguson	P

=== Roster ===
1925 Boston Red Sox
Roster
Pitchers: Bob Adams; Howard Ehmke; Alex Ferguson; Ray Francis; Oscar Fuhr; Curt Fullerton; Rudy Kallio; Joe Kiefer; Joe Lucey; Hal Neubauer; Jack Quinn; Buster Ross; Red Ruffing; Ted Wingfield; Paul Zahniser	Catchers: John Bischoff; Johnnie Heving; Val Picinich; Al Stokes; Infielders: Bud Connolly; Homer Ezzell; Chappie Geygan; Turkey Gross; Joe Harris; Mike Herrera; Dud Lee; Doc Prothro; Billy Rogell; Jack Rothrock; Phil Todt; Bill Wambsganss; Herb Welch	Outfielders: Ike Boone; Roy Carlyle; Shano Collins; Ira Flagstead; Tom Jenkins; Sy Rosenthal; Tex Vache; Bobby Veach; Denny Williams	Manager: Lee Fohl; Coaches: Lefty Leifield; Jack Ryan (Pitching)

== Player stats ==
=== Batting ===
==== Starters by position ====
Note: Pos = Position; G = Games played; AB = At bats; H = Hits; Avg. = Batting average; HR = Home runs; RBI = Runs batted in

Pos	Player	G	AB	H	Avg.	HR	RBI
C	Val Picinich	90	251	64	.255	1	25
1B	Phil Todt	141	544	151	.278	11	75
2B	Bill Wambsganss	111	360	83	.231	1	41
SS	Dud Lee	84	255	57	.224	0	19
3B	Doc Prothro	119	415	130	.313	0	51
OF	Ike Boone	133	476	157	.330	9	68
OF	Roy Carlyle	93	276	90	.326	7	49
OF	Ira Flagstead	148	572	160	.280	6	61

==== Other batters ====
Note: G = Games played; AB = At bats; H = Hits; Avg. = Batting average; HR = Home runs; RBI = Runs batted in

Player	G	AB	H	Avg.	HR	RBI
Tex Vache	110	252	79	.313	3	48
Denny Williams	69	218	50	.229	0	13
Homer Ezzell	58	186	53	.285	0	15
Billy Rogell	58	169	33	.195	0	17
John Bischoff	41	133	37	.278	1	16
Johnnie Heving	45	119	20	.168	0	6
Bud Connolly	43	107	28	.262	0	21
Sy Rosenthal	19	72	19	.264	0	8
Tom Jenkins	15	64	19	.297	0	5
Jack Rothrock	22	55	19	.345	0	7
Al Stokes	17	52	11	.212	0	1
Mike Herrera	10	39	15	.385	0	8
Herb Welch	13	38	11	.289	0	2
Turkey Gross	9	32	3	.094	0	2
Joe Harris	8	19	3	.158	1	2
Joe Lucey	10	15	2	.133	0	0
Chappie Geygan	3	11	2	.182	0	0
Bobby Veach	1	5	1	.200	0	2
Shano Collins	2	3	1	.333	0	1

=== Pitching ===
==== Starting pitchers ====
Note: G = Games pitched; IP = Innings pitched; W = Wins; L = Losses; ERA = Earned run average; SO = Strikeouts

Player	G	IP	W	L	ERA	SO
Howard Ehmke	34	260.2	9	20	3.73	95
Ted Wingfield	41	254.1	12	19	3.96	30
Red Ruffing	37	217.1	9	18	5.01	64
Jack Quinn	19	105.0	7	8	4.37	24
Alex Ferguson	5	15.2	0	2	10.91	5
Joe Kiefer	2	15.0	0	2	6.00	4

==== Other pitchers ====
Note: G = Games pitched; IP = Innings pitched; W = Wins; L = Losses; ERA = Earned run average; SO = Strikeouts

Player	G	IP	W	L	ERA	SO
Paul Zahniser	37	176.2	5	12	5.15	30
Buster Ross	33	94.1	3	8	6.20	15
Oscar Fuhr	39	91.1	0	6	6.60	27
Ray Francis	6	28.0	0	2	7.71	4
Curt Fullerton	4	22.2	0	3	3.18	3
Rudy Kallio	7	18.2	1	4	7.71	2
Joe Lucey	7	11.0	0	1	9.00	2

==== Relief pitchers ====
Note: G = Games pitched; W = Wins; L = Losses; SV = Saves; ERA = Earned run average; SO = Strikeouts

Player	G	W	L	SV	ERA	SO
Hal Neubauer	7	1	0	0	12.19	4
Bob Adams	2	0	0	0	7.94	1
