= 1926 Washington Senators season =

1926 Washington Senators
- League: American League
- Ballpark: Griffith Stadium
- City: Washington, D.C.
- Record: 81–69 (.540)
- League place: 4th
- Owners: Clark Griffith and William Richardson
- Managers: Bucky Harris

The 1926 Washington Senators won 81 games, lost 69, and finished in fourth place in the American League. They were managed by Bucky Harris and played home games at Griffith Stadium.

== Regular season ==
=== Season standings ===
American League
Team	W	L	Pct.	GB	Home	Road
New York Yankees	91	63	.591	—	50‍–‍25	41‍–‍38
Cleveland Indians	88	66	.571	3	49‍–‍31	39‍–‍35
Philadelphia Athletics	83	67	.553	6	44‍–‍27	39‍–‍40
Washington Senators	81	69	.540	8	42‍–‍30	39‍–‍39
Chicago White Sox	81	72	.529	9½	47‍–‍31	34‍–‍41
Detroit Tigers	79	75	.513	12	39‍–‍41	40‍–‍34
St. Louis Browns	62	92	.403	29	40‍–‍39	22‍–‍53
Boston Red Sox	46	107	.301	44½	25‍–‍51	21‍–‍56

=== Record vs. opponents ===
1926 American League record Sources:
Team	BOS	CWS	CLE	DET	NYY	PHA	SLB	WSH
Boston	—	6–16	6–16	7–15	5–17	8–14	11–11–1	3–18
Chicago	16–6	—	13–9	14–8–2	8–14	6–15	13–9	11–11
Cleveland	16–6	9–13	—	11–11	11–11	14–8	11–11	16–6
Detroit	15–7	8–14–2	11–11	—	10–12	11–11	12–10	12–10–1
New York	17–5	14–8	11–11	12–10	—	9–13	16–6	12–10–1
Philadelphia	14–8	15–6	8–14	11–11	13–9	—	15–7	7–12
St. Louis	11–11–1	9–13	11–11	10–12	6–16	7–15	—	8–14
Washington	18–3	11–11	6–16	10–12–1	10–12–1	12–7	14–8	—

=== Roster ===
1926 Washington Senators
Roster
Pitchers: Joe Bush; Stan Coveleski; Alvin Crowder; Alex Ferguson; Bump Hadley; Walter Johnson; Dick Jones; Harry Kelley; Frank Loftus; Firpo Marberry; Bill Morrell; George Murray; Curly Ogden; Emilio Palmero; Dutch Ruether; Lefty Thomas; Jimmy Uchrinscko	Catchers: Russ Ennis; Muddy Ruel; Hank Severeid; Bennie Tate; Infielders: Ossie Bluege; Bucky Harris; Joe Harris; Joe Judge; Buddy Myer; Roger Peckinpaugh; Bobby Reeves; Stuffy Stewart	Outfielders: Goose Goslin; Tex Jeanes; Earl McNeely; Sam Rice; Danny Taylor; Jack Tobin	Manager: Bucky Harris

== Player stats ==
=== Batting ===
==== Starters by position ====
Note: Pos = Position; G = Games played; AB = At bats; H = Hits; Avg. = Batting average; HR = Home runs; RBI = Runs batted in

Pos	Player	G	AB	H	Avg.	HR	RBI
C	Muddy Ruel	117	368	110	.299	1	55
1B	Joe Judge	134	453	132	.291	7	92
2B	Bucky Harris	141	537	152	.283	1	63
SS	Buddy Myer	132	434	132	.304	1	60
3B	Ossie Bluege	139	487	132	.271	3	65
OF	Goose Goslin	147	568	201	.354	17	109
OF	Sam Rice	152	641	216	.337	3	75
OF	Earl McNeely	124	442	134	.303	0	48

==== Other batters ====
Note: G = Games played; AB = At bats; H = Hits; Avg. = Batting average; HR = Home runs; RBI = Runs batted in

Player	G	AB	H	Avg.	HR	RBI
Joe Harris	92	257	79	.307	5	55
Roger Peckinpaugh	57	147	35	.238	1	14
Bennie Tate	59	142	38	.268	1	12
Stuffy Stewart	62	63	17	.270	0	9
Danny Taylor	21	50	15	.300	1	5
Bobby Reeves	20	49	11	.224	0	7
Hank Severeid	22	34	7	.206	0	4
Jack Tobin	27	33	7	.212	0	3
Tex Jeanes	21	30	7	.233	0	3
Russ Ennis	1	0	0	----	0	0

=== Pitching ===
==== Starting pitchers ====
Note: G = Games pitched; IP = Innings pitched; W = Wins; L = Losses; ERA = Earned run average; SO = Strikeouts

Player	G	IP	W	L	ERA	SO
Walter Johnson	33	260.2	15	16	3.63	125
Stan Coveleski	36	245.1	14	11	3.12	50
Dutch Ruether	23	169.1	12	6	4.84	48
George Murray	12	81.1	6	3	5.64	28
Joe Bush	12	71.1	1	8	6.69	27

==== Other pitchers ====
Note: G = Games pitched; IP = Innings pitched; W = Wins; L = Losses; ERA = Earned run average; SO = Strikeouts

Player	G	IP	W	L	ERA	SO
General Crowder	19	100.0	7	4	3.96	26
Curly Ogden	22	96.1	4	4	4.30	21
Alex Ferguson	19	47.2	3	4	7.74	16
Dick Jones	4	21.0	2	1	4.29	3
Emilio Palmero	7	17.0	2	2	4.76	6

==== Relief pitchers ====
Note: G = Games pitched; W = Wins; L = Losses; SV = Saves; ERA = Earned run average; SO = Strikeouts

Player	G	W	L	SV	ERA	SO
Firpo Marberry	64	12	7	22	3.00	43
Bill Morrell	26	3	3	1	5.30	16
Harry Kelley	7	0	0	0	8.10	6
Lefty Thomas	6	0	0	0	5.19	3
Jimmy Uchrinscko	3	0	0	0	10.13	0
Bump Hadley	1	0	0	0	12.00	0
Frank Loftus	1	0	0	0	9.00	0
