= 1925 Washington Senators season =

1925 Washington Senators
- American League champions
- League: American League
- Ballpark: Griffith Stadium
- City: Washington, D.C.
- Record: 96–51 (.653)
- League place: 1st
- Owners: Clark Griffith and William Richardson
- Managers: Bucky Harris

The 1925 Washington Senators won 96 games, lost 55, and finished in first place in the American League. Fueled by the excitement of winning their second AL pennant, the Senators led 3 games to 1 in the World Series before succumbing to the Pittsburgh Pirates.

On September 28, the Senators were guests of President Calvin Coolidge at the White House, becoming the first reigning World Series champions to visit the White House.

== Regular season ==
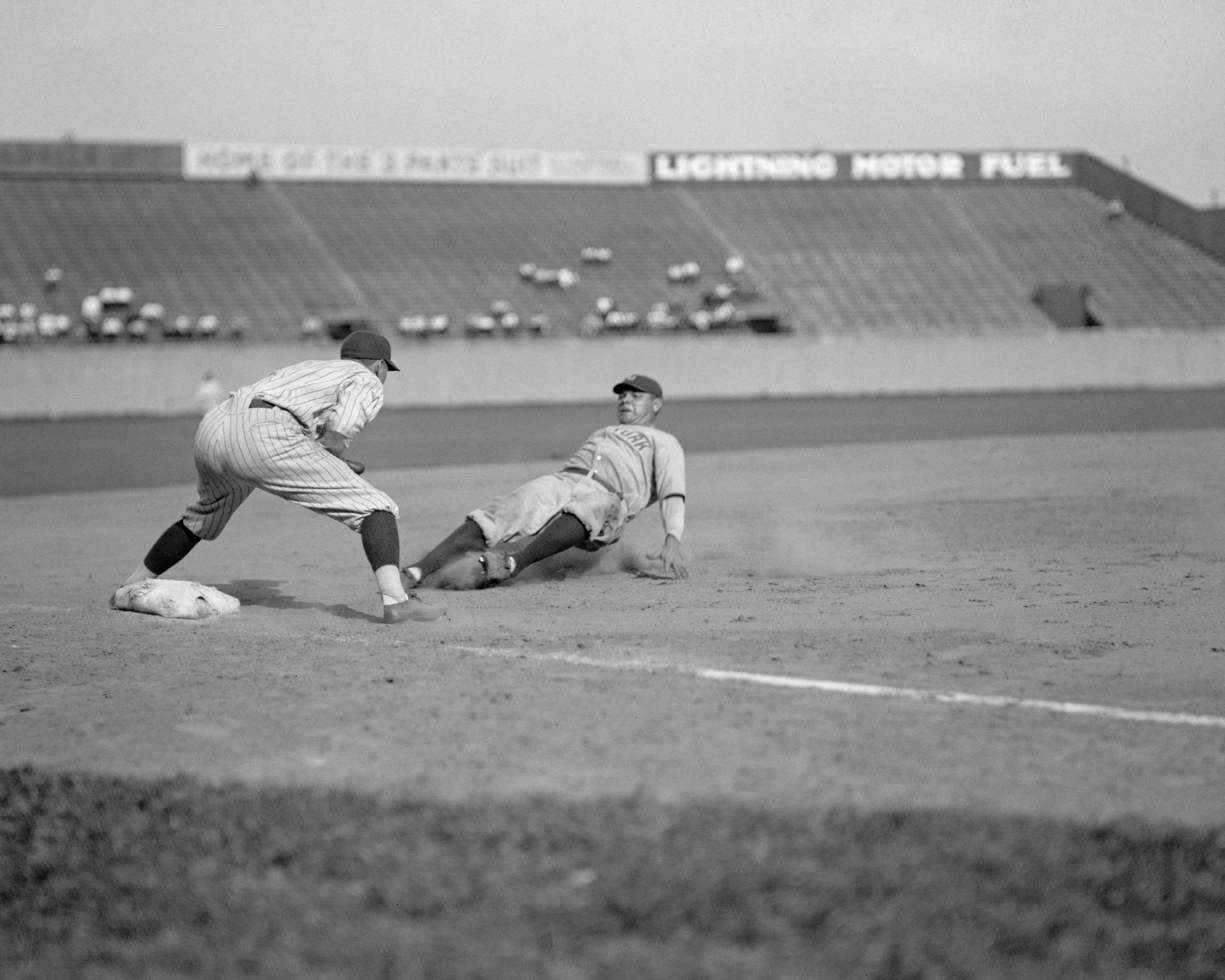
Senators third baseman Ossie Bluege looks on as New York Yankees outfielder Babe Ruth slidies into third base at Griffith Stadium in Washington, D.C., on June 23, 1925.

=== Season standings ===
American League
Team	W	L	Pct.	GB	Home	Road
Washington Senators	96	55	.636	—	53‍–‍22	43‍–‍33
Philadelphia Athletics	88	64	.579	8½	51‍–‍26	37‍–‍38
St. Louis Browns	82	71	.536	15	45‍–‍32	37‍–‍39
Detroit Tigers	81	73	.526	16½	43‍–‍34	38‍–‍39
Chicago White Sox	79	75	.513	18½	44‍–‍33	35‍–‍42
Cleveland Indians	70	84	.455	27½	37‍–‍39	33‍–‍45
New York Yankees	69	85	.448	28½	42‍–‍36	27‍–‍49
Boston Red Sox	47	105	.309	49½	28‍–‍47	19‍–‍58

=== Record vs. opponents ===
1925 American League record Sources:
Team	BOS	CWS	CLE	DET	NYY	PHA	SLB	WSH
Boston	—	9–13	7–15	5–17	9–13	5–17	5–16	7–14
Chicago	13–9	—	14–8	13–9	13–9	8–14	9–13	9–13
Cleveland	15–7	8–14	—	11–11–1	10–12	11–11	11–11	4–18
Detroit	17–5	9–13	11–11–1	—	14–8–1	8–14	12–10	10–12
New York	13–9	9–13	12–10	8–14–1	—	9–13	11–11–1	7–15
Philadelphia	17–5	14–8	11–11	14–8	13–9	—	12–10	7–13–1
St. Louis	16–5	13–9	11–11	10–12	11–11–1	10–12	—	11–11
Washington	14–7	13–9	18–4	12–10	15–7	13–7–1	11–11	—

=== Roster ===
1925 Washington Senators
Roster
Pitchers: Win Ballou; Stan Coveleski; Alex Ferguson; Vean Gregg; Walter Johnson; Harry Kelley; Jim Lyle; Firpo Marberry; George Mogridge; Curly Ogden; Spencer Pumpelly; Dutch Ruether; Allen Russell; Lefty Thomas; Tom Zachary	Catchers: Pinky Hargrave; Muddy Ruel; Hank Severeid; Bennie Tate; Infielders: Spencer Adams; Ossie Bluege; Bucky Harris; Joe Harris; Joe Judge; Frank McGee; Mike McNally; Buddy Myer; Roger Peckinpaugh; Everett Scott; Mule Shirley; Stuffy Stewart	Outfielders: Goose Goslin; Tex Jeanes; Nemo Leibold; Wid Matthews; Earl McNeely; Sam Rice; Bobby Veach; Other batters: Roy Carlyle	Manager: Bucky Harris; Coaches: Nick Altrock; Al Schacht

== Player stats ==
= Indicates team leader

= Indicates league leader

=== Batting ===
==== Starters by position ====
Note: Pos = Position; G = Games played; AB = At bats; H = Hits; Avg. = Batting average; HR = Home runs; RBI = Runs batted in

Pos	Player	G	AB	H	Avg.	HR	RBI
C	Muddy Ruel	127	393	122	.310	0	54
1B	Joe Judge	112	376	118	.314	8	66
2B	Bucky Harris	144	551	158	.287	1	66
SS	Roger Peckinpaugh	126	422	124	.294	4	64
3B	Ossie Bluege	145	522	150	.287	4	79
OF	Goose Goslin	150	601	201	.334	18	113
OF	Sam Rice	152	649	227	.350	1	87
OF	Earl McNeely	122	385	110	.286	3	37

==== Other batters ====
Note: G = Games played; AB = At bats; H = Hits; Avg. = Batting average; HR = Home runs; RBI = Runs batted in

Player	G	AB	H	Avg.	HR	RBI
Joe Harris	100	300	97	.323	12	59
Hank Severeid	50	110	39	.355	0	14
Everett Scott	33	103	28	.272	0	18
Nemo Leibold	56	84	23	.274	0	7
Spencer Adams	39	55	15	.273	0	4
Bobby Veach	18	37	9	.243	0	8
Bennie Tate	16	27	13	.481	0	7
Mule Shirley	14	23	3	.130	0	2
Mike McNally	12	21	3	.143	0	0
Tex Jeanes	15	19	5	.263	1	4
Stuffy Stewart	7	17	6	.353	0	3
Wid Matthews	10	9	4	.444	0	1
Buddy Myer	4	8	2	.250	0	0
Pinky Hargrave	5	6	3	.500	0	0
Frank McGee	2	3	0	.000	0	0
Roy Carlyle	1	1	0	.000	0	0

=== Pitching ===
==== Starting pitchers ====
Note: G = Games pitched; IP = Innings pitched; W = Wins; L = Losses; ERA = Earned run average; SO = Strikeouts

Player	G	IP	W	L	ERA	SO
Stan Coveleski	32	241.0	20	5	2.84	58
Walter Johnson	30	229.0	20	7	3.07	108
Dutch Ruether	30	223.1	18	7	3.87	68
Tom Zachary	38	217.2	12	15	3.85	58
Alex Ferguson	7	55.1	5	1	3.25	24
George Mogridge	10	53.0	3	4	4.08	12
Lefty Thomas	2	13.0	0	2	2.08	10

==== Other pitchers ====
Note: G = Games pitched; IP = Innings pitched; W = Wins; L = Losses; ERA = Earned run average; SO = Strikeouts

Player	G	IP	W	L	ERA	SO
Vean Gregg	26	74.1	2	2	4.12	18
Curly Ogden	17	42.0	3	1	4.50	6
Harry Kelley	6	16.0	1	1	9.00	7

==== Relief pitchers ====
Note: G = Games pitched; W = Wins; L = Losses; SV = Saves; ERA = Earned run average; SO = Strikeouts

Player	G	W	L	SV	ERA	SO
Firpo Marberry	55	9	5	16	3.47	53
Allen Russell	32	2	4	2	5.77	25
Win Ballou	10	1	1	0	4.55	13
Spencer Pumpelly	1	0	0	0	9.00	1
Jim Lyle	1	0	0	0	6.00	3
