= 1926 Boston Red Sox season =

Major League Baseball season

1926 Boston Red Sox
- League: American League
- Ballpark: Fenway Park
- City: Boston, Massachusetts
- Record: 46–107 (.301)
- League place: 8th
- Owners: J. A. Robert Quinn
- Managers: Lee Fohl
- Radio: WNAC (Fred Hoey)
- Stats: ESPN.com; Baseball Reference

The 1926 Boston Red Sox season was the 26th season in the franchise's Major League Baseball history. The Red Sox finished last in the eight-team American League (AL) with a record of 46 wins and 107 losses, 44 1/2 games behind the New York Yankees.

After a home game at Fenway Park on May 8, 1926, a fire destroyed the third base bleachers. This was followed by a storm with severe winds on July 19, which destroyed 500 to 600 seats at the ballpark.

== Regular season ==
=== Season standings ===
American League
Team	W	L	Pct.	GB	Home	Road
New York Yankees	91	63	.591	—	50‍–‍25	41‍–‍38
Cleveland Indians	88	66	.571	3	49‍–‍31	39‍–‍35
Philadelphia Athletics	83	67	.553	6	44‍–‍27	39‍–‍40
Washington Senators	81	69	.540	8	42‍–‍30	39‍–‍39
Chicago White Sox	81	72	.529	9½	47‍–‍31	34‍–‍41
Detroit Tigers	79	75	.513	12	39‍–‍41	40‍–‍34
St. Louis Browns	62	92	.403	29	40‍–‍39	22‍–‍53
Boston Red Sox	46	107	.301	44½	25‍–‍51	21‍–‍56

=== Record vs. opponents ===
1926 American League record Sources:
Team	BOS	CWS	CLE	DET	NYY	PHA	SLB	WSH
Boston	—	6–16	6–16	7–15	5–17	8–14	11–11–1	3–18
Chicago	16–6	—	13–9	14–8–2	8–14	6–15	13–9	11–11
Cleveland	16–6	9–13	—	11–11	11–11	14–8	11–11	16–6
Detroit	15–7	8–14–2	11–11	—	10–12	11–11	12–10	12–10–1
New York	17–5	14–8	11–11	12–10	—	9–13	16–6	12–10–1
Philadelphia	14–8	15–6	8–14	11–11	13–9	—	15–7	7–12
St. Louis	11–11–1	9–13	11–11	10–12	6–16	7–15	—	8–14
Washington	18–3	11–11	6–16	10–12–1	10–12–1	12–7	14–8	—

=== Opening Day lineup ===
Ira Flagstead	CF
Fred Haney	3B
Sy Rosenthal	RF
Phil Todt	1B
Tom Jenkins	LF
Mike Herrera	2B
Dud Lee	SS
Alex Gaston	C
Howard Ehmke	P

=== Roster ===
1926 Boston Red Sox
Roster
Pitchers: Bill Clowers; Howard Ehmke; Happy Foreman; Slim Harriss; Fred Heimach; Joe Kiefer; Del Lundgren; Danny MacFayden; Buster Ross; Red Ruffing; Jack Russell; Rudy Sommers; Tony Welzer; Hal Wiltse; Ted Wingfield; Paul Zahniser	Catchers: John Bischoff; Alex Gaston; Bill Moore; Al Stokes; Infielders: Boob Fowler; Chappie Geygan; Fred Haney; Mike Herrera; Dud Lee; Emmett McCann; Bill Regan; Topper Rigney; Jack Rothrock; Phil Todt	Outfielders: Fred Bratschi; Roy Carlyle; Howie Fitzgerald; Ira Flagstead; Baby Doll Jacobson; Tom Jenkins; Sy Rosenthal; Wally Shaner; Jack Tobin; Other batters: Sam Langford	Manager: Lee Fohl; Coaches: Lefty Leifield; Jack Ryan (Pitching)

== Player stats ==
=== Batting ===
==== Starters by position ====
Note: Pos = Position; G = Games played; AB = At bats; H = Hits; Avg. = Batting average; HR = Home runs; RBI = Runs batted in

Pos	Player	G	AB	H	Avg.	HR	RBI
C	Alex Gaston	98	301	67	.223	0	21
1B	Phil Todt	154	599	153	.255	7	70
2B	Bill Regan	108	403	106	.263	4	36
SS	Topper Rigney	148	525	142	.270	4	50
3B	Fred Haney	138	462	102	.221	0	52
OF	Baby Doll Jacobson	98	394	120	.305	6	68
OF	Ira Flagstead	98	415	124	.299	3	31
OF	Sy Rosenthal	104	285	76	.267	4	34

==== Other batters ====
Note: G = Games played; AB = At bats; H = Hits; Avg. = Batting average; HR = Home runs; RBI = Runs batted in

Player	G	AB	H	Avg.	HR	RBI
Mike Herrera	74	237	61	.257	0	19
Jack Tobin	51	209	57	.273	1	18
Wally Shaner	69	191	54	.283	0	19
Fred Bratschi	72	167	46	.275	0	19
Roy Carlyle	45	165	47	.285	2	16
John Bischoff	59	127	33	.260	0	19
Howie Fitzgerald	31	97	25	.258	0	8
Al Stokes	30	86	14	.163	0	6
Tom Jenkins	21	50	9	.180	0	6
Bill Moore	5	18	3	.167	0	0
Jack Rothrock	15	17	5	.294	0	2
Chappie Geygan	4	10	3	.300	0	0
Boob Fowler	2	8	1	.125	0	1
Dud Lee	2	7	1	.143	0	0
Emmett McCann	6	3	0	.000	0	0
Sam Langford	1	1	0	.000	0	0

=== Pitching ===
==== Starting pitchers ====
Note: G = Games pitched; IP = Innings pitched; W = Wins; L = Losses; ERA = Earned run average; SO = Strikeouts

Player	G	IP	W	L	ERA	SO
Hal Wiltse	37	196.1	8	15	4.22	59
Paul Zahniser	30	172.0	6	18	4.97	35
Slim Harriss	21	113.0	6	10	4.46	34
Howard Ehmke	14	97.1	3	10	5.46	38

==== Other pitchers ====
Note: G = Games pitched; IP = Innings pitched; W = Wins; L = Losses; ERA = Earned run average; SO = Strikeouts

Player	G	IP	W	L	ERA	SO
Ted Wingfield	43	190.2	11	16	4.44	30
Red Ruffing	37	166.0	6	15	4.39	58
Tony Welzer	39	139.0	4	3	4.86	29
Fred Heimach	20	102.0	2	9	5.65	17
Jack Russell	36	98.0	0	5	3.58	17
Danny MacFayden	3	13.0	0	1	4.85	1

==== Relief pitchers ====
Note: G = Games pitched; W = Wins; L = Losses; SV = Saves; ERA = Earned run average; SO = Strikeouts

Player	G	W	L	SV	ERA	SO
Del Lundgren	18	0	2	0	7.55	11
Joe Kiefer	11	0	2	0	4.80	4
Happy Foreman	3	0	0	0	3.68	3
Rudy Sommers	2	0	0	0	13.50	0
Bill Clowers	2	0	0	0	0.00	0
Buster Ross	1	0	1	0	16.88	0
