= 1926 Philadelphia Athletics season =

1926 Philadelphia Athletics
- League: American League
- Ballpark: Shibe Park
- City: Philadelphia
- Record: 83–67 (.553)
- League place: 3rd
- Owners: Connie Mack, Tom Shibe and John Shibe
- Managers: Connie Mack

The 1926 Philadelphia Athletics season involved the A's finishing third in the American League with a record of 83 wins and 67 losses.

== Regular season ==
38-year-old Walter Johnson of the Washington Senators threw a 15-inning shutout against the A's for his record sixth Opening Day shutout.

=== Season standings ===
American League
Team	W	L	Pct.	GB	Home	Road
New York Yankees	91	63	.591	—	50‍–‍25	41‍–‍38
Cleveland Indians	88	66	.571	3	49‍–‍31	39‍–‍35
Philadelphia Athletics	83	67	.553	6	44‍–‍27	39‍–‍40
Washington Senators	81	69	.540	8	42‍–‍30	39‍–‍39
Chicago White Sox	81	72	.529	9½	47‍–‍31	34‍–‍41
Detroit Tigers	79	75	.513	12	39‍–‍41	40‍–‍34
St. Louis Browns	62	92	.403	29	40‍–‍39	22‍–‍53
Boston Red Sox	46	107	.301	44½	25‍–‍51	21‍–‍56

=== Record vs. opponents ===
1926 American League record Sources:
Team	BOS	CWS	CLE	DET	NYY	PHA	SLB	WSH
Boston	—	6–16	6–16	7–15	5–17	8–14	11–11–1	3–18
Chicago	16–6	—	13–9	14–8–2	8–14	6–15	13–9	11–11
Cleveland	16–6	9–13	—	11–11	11–11	14–8	11–11	16–6
Detroit	15–7	8–14–2	11–11	—	10–12	11–11	12–10	12–10–1
New York	17–5	14–8	11–11	12–10	—	9–13	16–6	12–10–1
Philadelphia	14–8	15–6	8–14	11–11	13–9	—	15–7	7–12
St. Louis	11–11–1	9–13	11–11	10–12	6–16	7–15	—	8–14
Washington	18–3	11–11	6–16	10–12–1	10–12–1	12–7	14–8	—

=== Roster ===
1926 Philadelphia Athletics
Roster
Pitchers: Stan Baumgartner; Howard Ehmke; Sam Gray; Lefty Grove; Slim Harriss; Fred Heimach; Joe Pate; Jack Quinn; Eddie Rommel; Rube Walberg; Lefty Willis	Catchers: Mickey Cochrane; Jimmie Foxx; Cy Perkins; Infielders: Max Bishop; Jimmy Dykes; Charlie Engle; Chick Galloway; Sammy Hale; Joe Hauser; Jim Poole; Frank Sigafoos; Bill Wambsganss	Outfielders: Dave Barbee; Walter French; Tom Jenkins; Bill Lamar; Alex Metzler; Bing Miller; Al Simmons; Frank Welch	Manager: Connie Mack

== Player stats ==
=== Batting ===
==== Starters by position ====
Note: Pos = Position; G = Games played; AB = At bats; H = Hits; Avg. = Batting average; HR = Home runs; RBI = Runs batted in

Pos	Player	G	AB	H	Avg.	HR	RBI
C	Mickey Cochrane	120	370	101	.273	8	47
1B	Jim Poole	112	361	106	.294	8	63
2B	Max Bishop	122	400	106	.265	0	33
SS	Chick Galloway	133	408	98	.240	0	49
3B	Jimmy Dykes	124	429	123	.287	1	42
OF	Al Simmons	147	583	199	.341	19	110
OF	Bill Lamar	116	419	119	.284	5	51
OF	Walter French	112	397	121	.305	1	36

==== Other batters ====
Note: G = Games played; AB = At bats; H = Hits; Avg. = Batting average; HR = Home runs; RBI = Runs batted in

Player	G	AB	H	Avg.	HR	RBI
Sammy Hale	111	327	92	.281	4	44
Joe Hauser	91	229	44	.192	8	36
Frank Welch	75	174	49	.282	4	23
Cy Perkins	63	148	43	.291	0	19
Bing Miller	38	110	32	.291	2	13
Alex Metzler	20	67	16	.239	0	11
Bill Wambsganss	54	54	19	.352	0	2
Dave Barbee	19	47	8	.170	1	5
Frank Sigafoos	13	43	11	.256	0	2
Jimmie Foxx	26	32	10	.313	0	5
Tom Jenkins	6	23	4	.174	0	0
Charlie Engle	19	19	2	.105	0	0

=== Pitching ===
==== Starting pitchers ====
Note: G = Games pitched; IP = Innings pitched; W = Wins; L = Losses; ERA = Earned run average; SO = Strikeouts

Player	G	IP	W	L	ERA	SO
Lefty Grove	45	258.0	13	13	2.51	194
Eddie Rommel	37	219.0	11	11	3.08	52
Jack Quinn	31	163.2	10	11	3.41	58
Howard Ehmke	20	147.1	12	4	2.81	55
Slim Harriss	12	57.0	3	5	4.11	13

==== Other pitchers ====
Note: G = Games pitched; IP = Innings pitched; W = Wins; L = Losses; ERA = Earned run average; SO = Strikeouts

Player	G	IP	W	L	ERA	SO
Rube Walberg	40	151.0	12	10	2.80	72
Sam Gray	38	150.2	11	12	3.64	82

==== Relief pitchers ====
Note: G = Games pitched; W = Wins; L = Losses; SV = Saves; ERA = Earned run average; SO = Strikeouts

Player	G	W	L	SV	ERA	SO
Joe Pate	47	9	0	7	2.71	24
Lefty Willis	13	0	0	1	1.39	13
Fred Heimach	13	1	0	0	2.84	8
Stan Baumgartner	10	1	1	0	4.03	0

== League leaders ==
- Lefty Grove
  - American League leader, Strikeouts
