= 1926 Chicago White Sox season =

1926 Chicago White Sox
- League: American League
- Ballpark: Comiskey Park
- City: Chicago, Illinois
- Record: 81–72 (.529)
- League place: 5th
- Owners: Charles Comiskey
- Managers: Eddie Collins
- Radio: WMAQ (Hal Totten)

The 1926 Chicago White Sox season was a season in Major League Baseball. The team finished fifth in the American League with a record of 81–72, 9.5 games behind the pennant-winning New York Yankees.

== Regular season ==
=== Season standings ===
American League
Team	W	L	Pct.	GB	Home	Road
New York Yankees	91	63	.591	—	50‍–‍25	41‍–‍38
Cleveland Indians	88	66	.571	3	49‍–‍31	39‍–‍35
Philadelphia Athletics	83	67	.553	6	44‍–‍27	39‍–‍40
Washington Senators	81	69	.540	8	42‍–‍30	39‍–‍39
Chicago White Sox	81	72	.529	9½	47‍–‍31	34‍–‍41
Detroit Tigers	79	75	.513	12	39‍–‍41	40‍–‍34
St. Louis Browns	62	92	.403	29	40‍–‍39	22‍–‍53
Boston Red Sox	46	107	.301	44½	25‍–‍51	21‍–‍56

=== Record vs. opponents ===
1926 American League record Sources:
Team	BOS	CWS	CLE	DET	NYY	PHA	SLB	WSH
Boston	—	6–16	6–16	7–15	5–17	8–14	11–11–1	3–18
Chicago	16–6	—	13–9	14–8–2	8–14	6–15	13–9	11–11
Cleveland	16–6	9–13	—	11–11	11–11	14–8	11–11	16–6
Detroit	15–7	8–14–2	11–11	—	10–12	11–11	12–10	12–10–1
New York	17–5	14–8	11–11	12–10	—	9–13	16–6	12–10–1
Philadelphia	14–8	15–6	8–14	11–11	13–9	—	15–7	7–12
St. Louis	11–11–1	9–13	11–11	10–12	6–16	7–15	—	8–14
Washington	18–3	11–11	6–16	10–12–1	10–12–1	12–7	14–8	—

=== Roster ===
1926 Chicago White Sox
Roster
Pitchers: Ted Blankenship; Sarge Connally; Les Cox; Jim Joe Edwards; Red Faber; Dixie Leverett; Ted Lyons; Pryor McBee; Milt Steengrafe; Tommy Thomas; Sloppy Thurston	Catchers: Buck Crouse; Johnny Grabowski; Harry McCurdy; Ray Schalk; Infielders: Moe Berg; Bud Clancy; Eddie Collins; Bill Hunnefield; Willie Kamm; Ray Morehart; Everett Scott; Earl Sheely; Pat Veltman	Outfielders: Bill Barrett; Bibb Falk; Tom Gulley; Spencer Harris; Johnny Mostil; Pid Purdy	Manager: Eddie Collins; Coaches: Chief Bender; Ben Egan

== Player stats ==
=== Batting ===
==== Starters by position ====
Note: Pos = Position; G = Games played; AB = At bats; H = Hits; Avg. = Batting average; HR = Home runs; RBI = Runs batted in

Pos	Player	G	AB	H	Avg.	HR	RBI
C	Ray Schalk	82	226	60	.265	0	32
1B	Earl Sheely	145	525	157	.299	6	87
2B	Eddie Collins	106	375	129	.344	1	62
SS	Bill Hunnefield	131	470	129	.274	3	48
3B	Willie Kamm	143	480	141	.294	0	63
OF	Johnny Mostil	148	600	197	.328	4	41
OF	Bibb Falk	155	566	195	.345	8	108
OF	Bill Barrett	111	368	113	.307	6	61

==== Other batters ====
Note: G = Games played; AB = At bats; H = Hits; Avg. = Batting average; HR = Home runs; RBI = Runs batted in

Player	G	AB	H	Avg.	HR	RBI
Spence Harris	80	222	56	.252	2	27
Ray Morehart	73	192	61	.318	0	19
Everett Scott	40	143	36	.252	0	13
Buck Crouse	49	135	32	.237	0	19
Johnny Grabowski	48	122	32	.262	1	11
Moe Berg	41	113	25	.221	0	7
Harry McCurdy	44	86	28	.326	1	11
Bud Clancy	12	38	13	.342	0	7
Tom Gulley	16	35	8	.229	0	8
Pid Purdy	11	33	6	.182	0	6
Pat Veltman	5	4	1	.250	0	0

=== Pitching ===
==== Starting pitchers ====
Note: G = Games pitched; IP = Innings pitched; W = Wins; L = Losses; ERA = Earned run average; SO = Strikeouts

Player	G	IP	W	L	ERA	SO
Ted Lyons	39	283.2	18	16	3.01	51
Tommy Thomas	44	249.0	15	12	3.80	127
Ted Blankenship	29	209.1	13	10	3.61	66
Red Faber	27	184.2	15	9	3.56	65

==== Other pitchers ====
Note: G = Games pitched; IP = Innings pitched; W = Wins; L = Losses; ERA = Earned run average; SO = Strikeouts

Player	G	IP	W	L	ERA	SO
Jim Joe Edwards	32	142.0	6	9	4.18	41
Sloppy Thurston	31	134.1	6	8	5.02	35
Sarge Connally	31	108.1	6	5	3.16	47
Dixie Leverett	6	24.0	1	1	6.00	12

==== Relief pitchers ====
Note: G = Games pitched; W = Wins; L = Losses; SV = Saves; ERA = Earned run average; SO = Strikeouts

Player	G	W	L	SV	ERA	SO
Milt Steengrafe	13	1	1	0	3.99	10
Les Cox	2	0	1	0	5.40	3
Pryor McBee	1	0	0	0	6.75	1
