= Hal Neubauer =

American baseball player (1902–1949)

- Pitcher
- Born: May 13, 1902; Hoboken, New Jersey, U.S.
- Died: September 9, 1949 (aged 47); Barrington, Rhode Island, U.S.
- Batted: Right Threw: Right

MLB debut
- July 12, 1925, for the Boston Red Sox

Last MLB appearance
- September 8, 1925, for the Boston Red Sox

MLB statistics
- Win–loss record: 1–0
- Games: 7
- Earned run average: 12.19
- Stats at Baseball Reference

Teams
- Boston Red Sox (1925)

Harold Charles Neubauer (May 13, 1902 – September 9, 1949) was an American Major League Baseball relief pitcher. He played for the Boston Red Sox during the 1925 season. Listed at 6 ft 0 in (1.83 m), 185 lb., Neubauer batted and threw right-handed.

== Biography ==
A native of Hoboken, New Jersey, Neubauer attended Worcester Academy, and went on to play varsity baseball and football at Brown University. Described in 1923 by renowned sportswriter Hugh Fullerton as "the perennial smasher of pennant hopes of large eastern colleges," Neubauer compiled a 23–7 record on the mound in four seasons at Brown. His coach at Brown was former Boston Red Sox catcher and Brown botany professor Wally Snell. While at Brown in 1923, Neubauer played summer baseball for Falmouth of the Cape Cod Baseball League, competing against Snell, who managed the league's Hyannis team. Neubauer launched his senior season at Brown by tossing a no-hitter against Clark University in Brown's 18–0 six-inning victory.

Neubauer graduated from Brown in 1925, and was quickly signed by the Red Sox, joining a pitching staff that featured Baseball Hall of Famer Red Ruffing. Neubauer appeared in seven games for the 1925 Red Sox, his lone season in the major leagues. His major league debut came on July 12 against the Cleveland Indians at Dunn Field. He pitched two innings in relief of Boston starter Howard Ehmke, allowing three hits and three earned runs, while walking Hall of Famers Tris Speaker and Joe Sewell in the Red Sox' 13–2 loss. Neubauer recorded his only major league victory the following day, hurling two scoreless innings in Boston's 12–11 win over the Indians.

Neubauer's final major league appearance came on September 8 at Fenway Park in the second game of a doubleheader against the New York Yankees. He came on to pitch the ninth inning in relief of Buster Ross with the Yankees leading, 7–2. Neubauer got Hall of Fame center fielder Earle Combs to fly out, then struck out Bob Meusel. With two down, Neubauer allowed back-to-back singles to Hall of Fame sluggers Babe Ruth and Lou Gehrig, but wiggled out of the jam by striking out Ben Paschal. Boston managed two more runs in the bottom of the ninth off Yankee Hall of Fame hurler Herb Pennock, who had gone the distance for New York, but it was not enough as the Red Sox went down, 7–4.

In his seven major league appearances, Neubauer posted a 1–0 record with a 12.19 ERA, four strikeouts, 11 walks, and 17 hits allowed in 10 1/3 innings of work. He never made a fielding error or came to bat for Boston. Neubauer twirled for the Albany Senators of the Eastern League in 1926, posting a 3.76 ERA in 91 innings.

Neubauer and Madeleine Gay Fish were married in 1924, and had four children. He died in 1949 in Barrington, Rhode Island at age 47.
