= Coulterville =

Coulterville may refer to:

- Coulterville, California
- Coulterville, Illinois
- Coulterville, Pennsylvania
- Coulterville, Ontario, within the town of Caledon
