= Chuck Gavin =

American gridiron football player (1933–2012)

No. 61
- Position: Defensive end

Personal information
- Born: December 26, 1933; Lake, Mississippi
- Died: December 1, 2012 (aged 78); Denver, Colorado
- Listed height: 6 ft 1 in (1.85 m)
- Listed weight: 250 lb (113 kg)

Career information
- High school: Laurel (MS) Oak Park
- College: Tennessee State

Career history
- BC Lions (1959); Denver Broncos (1960–1963)
- Stats at Pro Football Reference

Chuck Gavin (December 26, 1933 – December 1, 2012) was an American football defensive end. He played for the Denver Broncos from 1960 to 1963.

He died on December 1, 2012, in Denver, Colorado at age 78.
