= 1926 Cleveland Indians season =

1926 Cleveland Indians
- League: American League
- Ballpark: Dunn Field
- City: Cleveland, Ohio
- Owners: Estate of Jim Dunn
- Managers: Tris Speaker

The 1926 Cleveland Indians season was a season in American baseball. The team finished second in the American League with a record of 88–66, 3 games behind the New York Yankees.

== Regular season ==
=== Season standings ===
American League
Team	W	L	Pct.	GB	Home	Road
New York Yankees	91	63	.591	—	50‍–‍25	41‍–‍38
Cleveland Indians	88	66	.571	3	49‍–‍31	39‍–‍35
Philadelphia Athletics	83	67	.553	6	44‍–‍27	39‍–‍40
Washington Senators	81	69	.540	8	42‍–‍30	39‍–‍39
Chicago White Sox	81	72	.529	9½	47‍–‍31	34‍–‍41
Detroit Tigers	79	75	.513	12	39‍–‍41	40‍–‍34
St. Louis Browns	62	92	.403	29	40‍–‍39	22‍–‍53
Boston Red Sox	46	107	.301	44½	25‍–‍51	21‍–‍56

=== Record vs. opponents ===
1926 American League record Sources:
Team	BOS	CWS	CLE	DET	NYY	PHA	SLB	WSH
Boston	—	6–16	6–16	7–15	5–17	8–14	11–11–1	3–18
Chicago	16–6	—	13–9	14–8–2	8–14	6–15	13–9	11–11
Cleveland	16–6	9–13	—	11–11	11–11	14–8	11–11	16–6
Detroit	15–7	8–14–2	11–11	—	10–12	11–11	12–10	12–10–1
New York	17–5	14–8	11–11	12–10	—	9–13	16–6	12–10–1
Philadelphia	14–8	15–6	8–14	11–11	13–9	—	15–7	7–12
St. Louis	11–11–1	9–13	11–11	10–12	6–16	7–15	—	8–14
Washington	18–3	11–11	6–16	10–12–1	10–12–1	12–7	14–8	—

=== Roster ===
1926 Cleveland Indians
Roster
Pitchers: Ray Benge; Garland Buckeye; Willis Hudlin; Benn Karr; Norm Lehr; Dutch Levsen; Jake Miller; Joe Shaute; Sherry Smith; By Speece; George Uhle	Catchers: Chick Autry; Glenn Myatt; Luke Sewell; Infielders: George Burns; Johnny Hodapp; Ray Knode; Guy Lacy; Rube Lutzke; Ernie Padgett; Joe Sewell; Freddy Spurgeon	Outfielders: Ike Eichrodt; Charlie Jamieson; Cliff Lee; Pat McNulty; Tris Speaker; Homer Summa	Manager: Tris Speaker; Coaches: Harry Mathews; Jack McCallister

== Player stats ==
=== Batting ===
==== Starters by position ====
Note: Pos = Position; G = Games played; AB = At bats; H = Hits; Avg. = Batting average; HR = Home runs; RBI = Runs batted in

Pos	Player	G	AB	H	Avg.	HR	RBI
C	Luke Sewell	126	433	103	.238	0	48
1B	George Burns	151	603	216	.358	4	115
2B	Freddy Spurgeon	149	614	181	.295	0	50
SS	Joe Sewell	154	578	187	.324	4	84
3B	Rube Lutzke	142	475	124	.261	0	58
OF	Homer Summa	154	581	179	.308	4	78
OF	Charlie Jamieson	143	555	166	.299	2	43
OF	Tris Speaker	150	539	164	.304	7	86

==== Other batters ====
Note: G = Games played; AB = At bats; H = Hits; Avg. = Batting average; HR = Home runs; RBI = Runs batted in

Player	G	AB	H	Avg.	HR	RBI
Glenn Myatt	56	117	29	.248	0	13
Ike Eichrodt	37	80	25	.313	0	7
Ernie Padgett	36	62	13	.210	0	6
Pat McNulty	48	56	14	.250	0	6
Cliff Lee	21	40	7	.175	1	2
Guy Lacy	13	24	4	.167	1	2
Ray Knode	31	24	8	.333	0	2
Chick Autry	3	7	1	.143	0	0
Johnny Hodapp	3	5	1	.200	0	0

=== Pitching ===
==== Starting pitchers ====
Note: G = Games pitched; IP = Innings pitched; W = Wins; L = Losses; ERA = Earned run average; SO = Strikeouts

Player	G	IP	W	L	ERA	SO
George Uhle	39	318.1	27	11	2.83	159
Dutch Levsen	33	237.1	16	13	3.41	53
Joe Shaute	34	206.2	14	10	3.53	47
Sherry Smith	27	188.1	11	10	3.73	25
Garland Buckeye	32	165.2	6	9	3.10	36
Jake Miller	18	82.2	7	4	3.27	24

==== Other pitchers ====
Note: G = Games pitched; IP = Innings pitched; W = Wins; L = Losses; ERA = Earned run average; SO = Strikeouts

Player	G	IP	W	L	ERA	SO
Benn Karr	30	113.1	5	6	5.00	23
Willis Hudlin	8	32.1	1	3	2.78	6

==== Relief pitchers ====
Note: G = Games pitched; W = Wins; L = Losses; SV = Saves; ERA = Earned run average; SO = Strikeouts

Player	G	W	L	SV	ERA	SO
Ray Benge	8	1	0	0	3.86	3
Norm Lehr	4	0	0	0	3.07	4
By Speece	2	0	0	0	0.00	1
