= Lake, Mississippi =

- Town
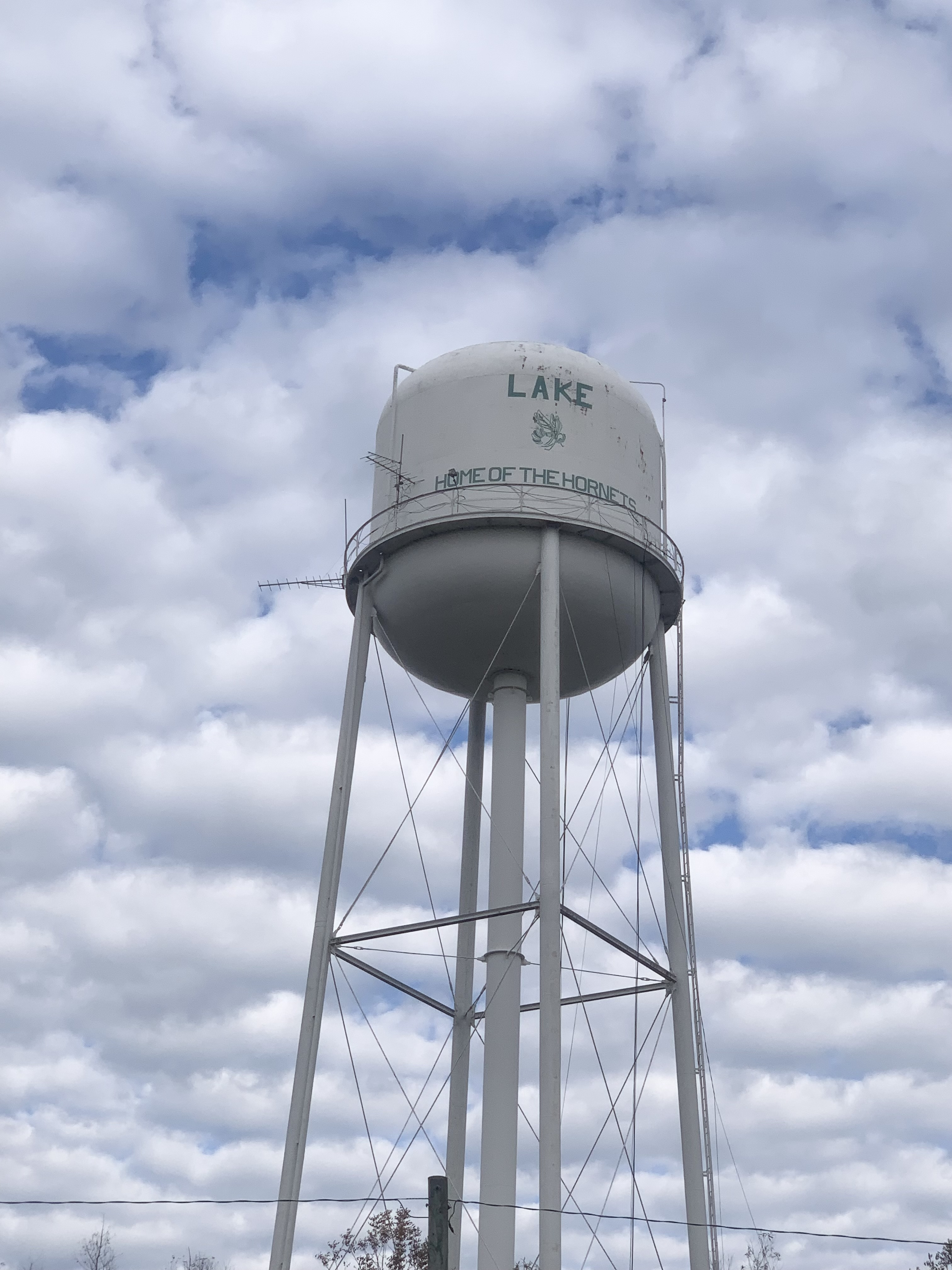
- Lake Water Tower

- Location of Lake, Mississippi

- Location in the United States
- Coordinates: 32°20′36″N 89°19′41″W
- Country: United States
- State: Mississippi
- Counties: Scott, Newton

Area
  - Total: 5.06 sq mi (13.11 km^{2})
  - Land: 5.06 sq mi (13.10 km^{2})
  - Water: 0.0077 sq mi (0.02 km^{2})
- Elevation: 440 ft (134 m)

Population (2020)
  - Total: 475
  - Density: 93.9/sq mi (36.27/km^{2})
- Time zone: UTC-6 (Central (CST))
  - Summer (DST): UTC-5 (CDT)
- ZIP code: 39092
- Area code: 601
- FIPS code: 28-38600
- GNIS feature ID: 0693679

Lake is a town in Newton and Scott counties, Mississippi. As of the 2020 census, Lake had a population of 475.

== History ==
Lake was originally known as Marysville. In 1859, the community was the eastern terminus of the railroad eastward from Vicksburg. A railway turntable and car barn were constructed east of the community. These structures were destroyed on April 24, 1863 during Grierson's Raid.

During Maj. Gen. William Tecumseh Sherman's Meridian campaign, a detachment led by General Andrew Hickenlooper destroyed two locomotives, 35 rail cars, tracks, and an engine house. The force also burned machine shops, livery stables, a railroad depot, sawmills, and turpentine tanks. The total amount of damage Sherman's force completed in Lake was estimated at $1,000,000.

Lake was incorporated on February 9, 1867.

In 1906, Lake had a population of 500, four churches, a bank, two sawmills, and two seminaries.

== Geography ==
Lake is located at 32°20′36″N 89°19′41″W (32.343228, -89.328193). The town is located mostly within Scott County, with a portion on the east in adjacent Newton County. In the 2000 census, 393 of the town's 408 residents (96.3%) lived in Scott County and 15 (3.7%) in Newton County.

According to the United States Census Bureau, the town has a total area of 1.1 square miles (2.8 km^{2}), all land.

== Demographics ==
Historical population
Census	Pop.	Note	%±
1880	190		—
1910	429		—
1920	455		6.1%
1930	375		−17.6%
1940	437		16.5%
1950	345		−21.1%
1960	297		−13.9%
1970	441		48.5%
1980	524		18.8%
1990	369		−29.6%
2000	408		10.6%
2010	324		−20.6%
2020	475		46.6%
U.S. Decennial Census

=== Racial and ethnic composition ===
Lake town, Mississippi – Racial and ethnic composition Note: the US Census treats Hispanic/Latino as an ethnic category. This table excludes Latinos from the racial categories and assigns them to a separate category. Hispanics/Latinos may be of any race.
Race / Ethnicity (NH = Non-Hispanic)	Pop 2000	Pop 2010	Pop 2020	% 2000	% 2010	% 2020
White alone (NH)	181	152	220	44.36%	46.91%	46.32%
Black or African American alone (NH)	225	163	228	55.15%	50.31%	48.00%
Native American or Alaska Native alone (NH)	0	0	0	0.00%	0.00%	0.00%
Asian alone (NH)	0	2	0	0.00%	0.62%	0.00%
Native Hawaiian or Pacific Islander alone (NH)	0	0	0	0.00%	0.00%	0.00%
Other race alone (NH)	0	0	3	0.00%	0.00%	0.63%
Mixed race or Multiracial (NH)	2	3	13	0.49%	0.93%	2.74%
Hispanic or Latino (any race)	0	4	11	0.00%	1.23%	2.32%
Total	408	324	475	100.00%	100.00%	100.00%

=== 2020 census ===
As of the 2020 United States census, there were 475 people, 172 households, and 139 families residing in the town.

=== 2000 census ===
As of the census of 2000, there were 408 people, 147 households, and 108 families residing in the town. The population density was 370.2 inhabitants per square mile (142.9/km^{2}). There were 159 housing units at an average density of 144.3 per square mile (55.7/km^{2}). The racial makeup of the town was 44.36% White, 55.15% African American, and 0.49% from two or more races.

There were 147 households, of which 33.3% had children under the age of 18 living with them; 46.9% were married couples living together; 22.4% had a female householder with no husband present; and 26.5% were non-families. 24.5% of all households were made up of individuals, and 10.9% had someone living alone who was 65 years of age or older. The average household size was 2.78 and the average family size was 3.31.

In the town, the population was spread out, with 27.0% under the age of 18, 13.2% from 18 to 24, 25.7% from 25 to 44, 20.6% from 45 to 64, and 13.5% who were 65 years of age or older. The median age was 34 years. For every 100 females, there were 86.3 males. For every 100 females age 18 and over, there were 79.5 males.

The median household income of Lake was $28,333, and the median family income was $40,833. Males had a median income of $28,000 versus $16,250 for females. The per capita income for the town was $12,858. About 20.0% of families and 21.6% of the population were below the poverty line, including 32.1% of those under age 18 and 32.6% of those age 65 or over.

== Education ==
The Scott County portion is served by the Scott County School District.

One portion of the city that lies in Newton County is served by the Newton County School District, and another portion in Newton County is in the Newton Municipal School District.

East Central Community College covers both Newton and Scott counties. It has its main campus in Decatur, and it operates the Forest/Scott County Career-Technical Center in Forest.

== Notable people ==
- Chuck Gavin, former defensive end for the Denver Broncos
- Randy Houser, country music singer and songwriter
- John Littlejohn, electric blues slide guitarist
- Jim Lyle, former Major League Baseball pitcher
