= Sy Rosenthal =

American baseball player (1903–1969)

- Outfielder
- Born: November 13, 1903; Boston, Massachusetts, U.S.
- Died: April 7, 1969 (aged 65); Boston, Massachusetts, U.S.
- Batted: Left Threw: Left

MLB debut
- September 8, 1925, for the Boston Red Sox

Last MLB appearance
- September 26, 1926, for the Boston Red Sox

MLB statistics
- Batting average: .266
- Hits: 95
- Home runs: 4
- Runs batted in: 44
- Stolen bases: 5
- Stats at Baseball Reference

Teams
- Boston Red Sox (1925–1926)

Simon Rosenthal (November 13, 1903 – April 7, 1969) was an American outfielder in Major League Baseball who played from 1925 through 1926 for the Boston Red Sox.

== Biography ==
Listed at 5 ft 9 in (1.75 m), 165 lb., Rosenthal batted and threw left-handed. He was born in Boston, Massachusetts. He was Jewish, and was the first Jewish player on the Red Sox.

In a two-season career, Rosenthal was a .266 hitter (95-for-357) with four home runs and 42 RBI in 123 games, including 40 runs, 17 doubles, five triples, five stolen bases and a .319 on-base percentage. His big league career was hampered by a foot injury from his time in the minor leagues; Rosenthal played professional baseball until 1935, but never again reached the major leagues.

Both Sy and his son Irwin (Buddy) Rosenthal joined to fight in World War II. The elder Rosenthal was initially rejected due to loose cartilage in his knee dating back to baseball days. After being rejected, he paid for knee surgery to have the cartilage removed and had some expensive dental work done so he could pass the fitness tests, and he ultimately made the cut in spite of his age.

Both Rosenthals suffered great tragedy during the war. Buddy was killed in the Pacific Ocean on Christmas Day 1943, at just 17 years old. Sy reportedly served aboard ship during the D-Day invasion of Normandy, and was later assigned to the USS Miantonomah. Sy was rendered paraplegic on September 25, 1944, when his ship hit a German mine off the coast of France.

Rosenthal had liquidated his businesses in order to pay for his pre-war medical procedures, so the Red Sox held a "Sy Rosenthal Day" on September 13, 1947, to raise money for his care. He remained active in a number of charitable causes throughout his life. Rosenthal died at the age of 65 in his hometown of Boston.

== See also ==
- 1925 Boston Red Sox season
- 1926 Boston Red Sox season
