= Pryor McBee =

American baseball player (1901–1963)

- Pitcher
- Born: June 20, 1901; Blanco, Oklahoma
- Died: April 19, 1963 (aged 61); Roseville, California
- Batted: Right Threw: Left

MLB debut
- May 22, 1926, for the Chicago White Sox

Last MLB appearance
- May 22, 1926, for the Chicago White Sox

MLB statistics
- Games played: 1
- Innings pitched: 1.1
- Earned run average: 6.75
- Stats at Baseball Reference

Teams
- Chicago White Sox (1926)

Pryor Edward McBee (June 20, 1901 – April 19, 1963) was a pitcher in Major League Baseball who appeared in one game as a reliever for the 1926 Chicago White Sox.

The Chicago Tribune reported in 1926 that McBee's income from baseball was "merely incidental" because he "owns some Oklahoma oil lands." McBee was one-eighth Choctaw and an enrolled member of the Choctaw Nation. He attended Jones Academy where the school's athletic director encouraged him to pursue baseball.

While pitching for the Jacksonville Tars during spring training in 1928, McBee struck out both Babe Ruth and Lou Gehrig in one inning.
