= Tex Vache =

American baseball player (1888–1953)

- Outfielder
- Born: November 17, 1888; Santa Monica, California, U.S.
- Died: June 11, 1953 (aged 64); Los Angeles, California, U.S.
- Batted: Right Threw: Right

MLB debut
- April 16, 1925, for the Boston Red Sox

Last MLB appearance
- September 22, 1925, for the Boston Red Sox

MLB statistics
- Games played: 110
- Batting average: .313
- Runs batted in: 48
- Stats at Baseball Reference

Teams
- Boston Red Sox (1925)

Ernest Lewis "Tex" Vache (November 17, 1888 – June 11, 1953) was an American professional baseball player.

== Biography ==
Vache was born November 17, 1888, in Santa Monica, California. It took him until the age of 36 to reach the Major Leagues. On April 16, 1925, Vache made his Major League debut for the Boston Red Sox. Throughout the year, Vache played 110 games.

His final game was September 22 that year; it was his only season in Major League Baseball, despite hitting .313 for the season.

Vache died 28 years later on June 11, 1953, in Los Angeles, California. He was 64 years old.
