= Štefurov =

- Municipality
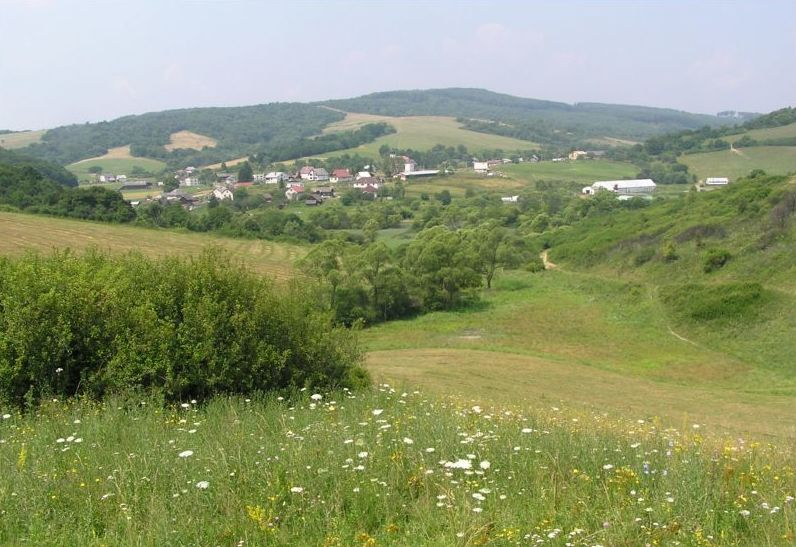

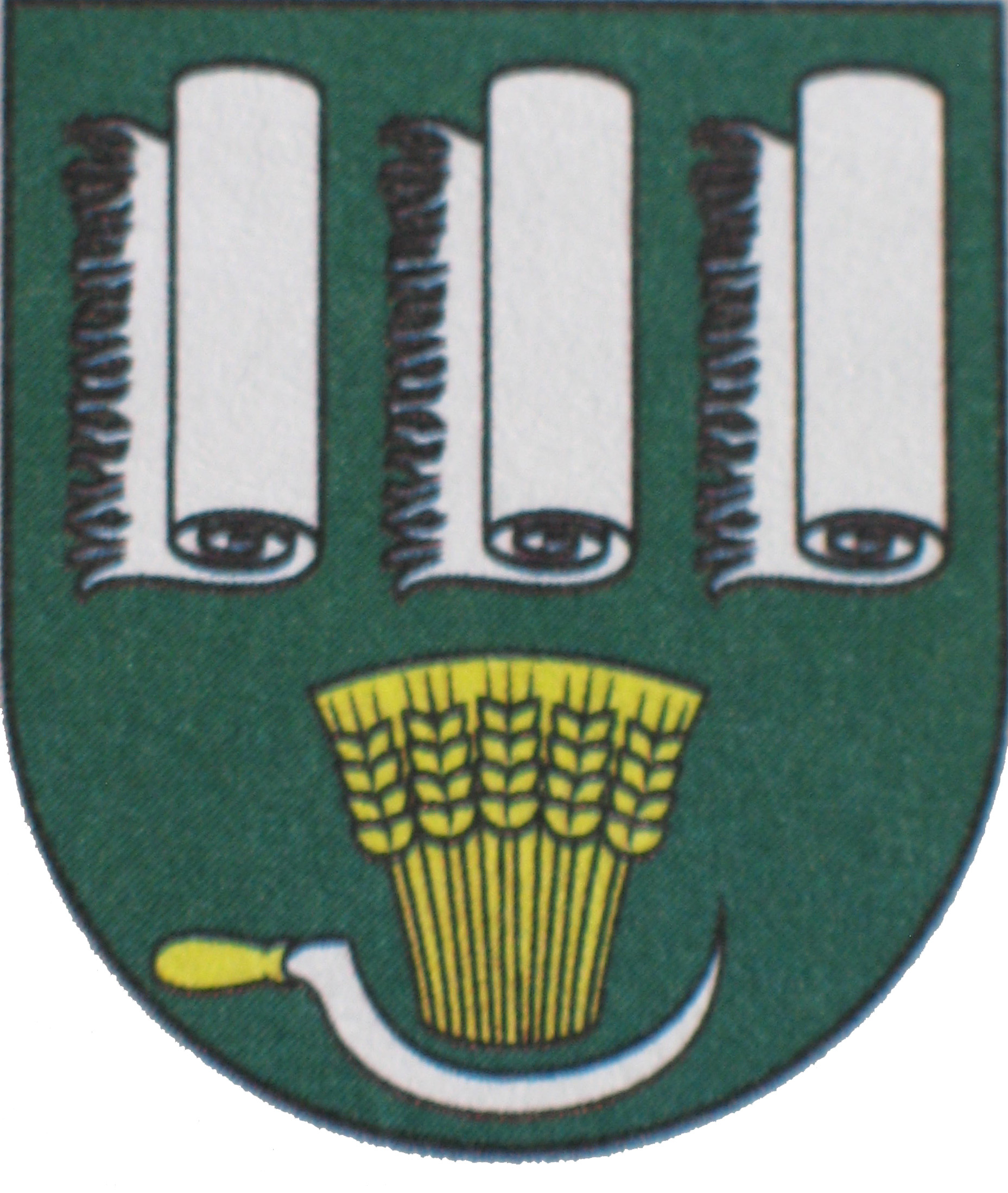
- Flag Coat of arms

- Location of Štefurov in the Prešov Region Location of Štefurov in Slovakia
- Coordinates: 49.18°N 21.50°E
- Country: Slovakia
- Region: Prešov Region
- District: Svidník District
- First mentioned: 1414

Area
  - Total: 8.75 km^{2} (3.38 sq mi)
- Elevation: 230 m (750 ft)

Population (2025)
  - Total: 95
- Time zone: UTC+1 (CET)
  - Summer (DST): UTC+2 (CEST)
- Postal code: 904 2
- Area code: +421 54
- Vehicle registration plate (until 2022): SK
- Website: stefurov.sk

Štefurov (Hungarian: Istvánd, until 1899: Stefuró) is a village and municipality in Svidník District in the Prešov Region of north-eastern Slovakia. The village has a population of 117 according to the 2011 census.

== History ==
In historical records the village was first mentioned in 1414.

== Geography ==
The municipality lies at an altitude of 230 metres (750 ft) and covers an area of 8.75 km^{2} (3.38 sq mi) (2025).

== Population ==
Population statistic (10 years)
Year	1995	2005	2015	2025
Count	115	109	115	95
Difference		−5.21%	+5.50%	−17.39%

Population statistic
Year	2024	2025
Count	99	95
Difference		−4.04%

It has a population of 95 people (31 December 2025).

=== Ethnicity ===
Census 2021 (1+ %)
Ethnicity	Number	Fraction
Slovak	101	96.19%
Rusyn	13	12.38%
Czech	2	1.9%
Total	105	

In year 2021 was 105 people by ethnicity 101 as Slovak, 13 as Rusyn, 2 as Czech, 1 as Ukrainian and 1 as Not found out.

Note on population: The difference values of population numbers in the table "Population statistic" and in the sections "Ethnicity" & "Religion" is caused by the use of various statistical methods.

=== Religion ===
Census 2021 (1+ %)
Religion	Number	Fraction
Greek Catholic Church	83	79.05%
Roman Catholic Church	15	14.29%
None	6	5.71%
Total	105	

In year 2021 was 105 people by religion 83 from Greek Catholic Church, 15 from Roman Catholic Church, 6 from None and 1 from Other and not ascertained christian church.

== Notable person ==
- Jack Quinn, Slovak-American professional baseball player who pitched until age 50
