= Freddy Spurgeon =

American baseball player (1901–1970)

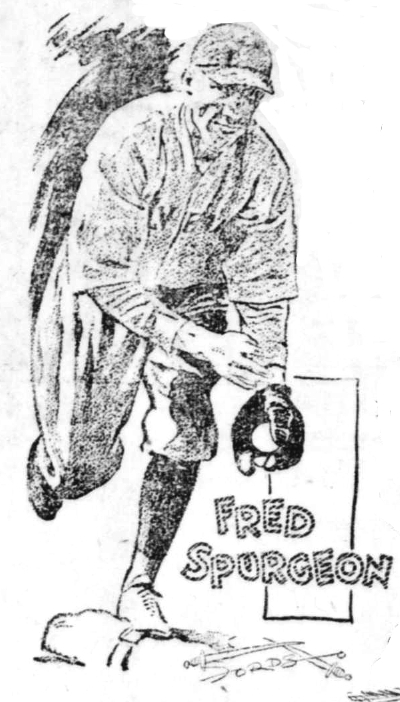
- Second baseman
- Born: October 9, 1901; Wabash, Indiana, U.S.
- Died: November 5, 1970 (aged 69); Kalamazoo, Michigan, U.S.
- Batted: Right Threw: Right

MLB debut
- September 19, 1924, for the Cleveland Indians

Last MLB appearance
- September 3, 1970, for the Cleveland Indians

MLB statistics
- Batting average: .285
- Home runs: 1
- Runs batted in: 101
- Stats at Baseball Reference

Teams
- Cleveland Indians (1924–1927)

Fred Spurgeon (October 9, 1901 – November 5, 1970) was a Major League Baseball second baseman who played for four seasons. He played for the Cleveland Indians from 1924 to 1927. He was the starting second baseman during the 1926 Cleveland Indians season and led the league in sacrifice hits with 35 and outs with 470. He hit his only major league home run on July 13, 1927, off of Dutch Ruether in a 5–3 loss to the New York Yankees at League Park.

In 316 games over four seasons, Spurgeon posted a .285 batting average (335-for-1176) with 181 runs, one home run and 101 RBI. He finished his career with a .952 fielding percentage.
