= Al Stokes =

American baseball player (1900–1986)

- Catcher
- Born: January 1, 1900; Chicago, Illinois, U.S.
- Died: December 19, 1986 (aged 86); Grantham, New Hampshire, U.S.
- Batted: Right Threw: Right

MLB debut
- May 10, 1925, for the Boston Red Sox

Last MLB appearance
- September 17, 1926, for the Boston Red Sox

MLB statistics
- Batting average: .181
- Home runs: 0
- Runs batted in: 7
- Stats at Baseball Reference

Teams
- Boston Red Sox (1925–1926)

Albert John Stokes, born Albert John Stocek, (January 1, 1900 – December 19, 1986) was an American backup catcher in Major League Baseball who played from 1925 through 1926 for the Boston Red Sox. Listed at 5' 9", 175 lb., Stokes batted and threw right-handed. He was born in Chicago, Illinois.

In a two-season career, Stokes was a .181 hitter (25-for-138) with 14 runs and seven RBI in 47 games, including three doubles, and four triples without any home runs.

Stokes died at the age of 86 in Grantham, New Hampshire while visiting his daughter from his home in Wilton, Connecticut.

== See also ==
- 1925 Boston Red Sox season
- 1926 Boston Red Sox season
