= Norm Lehr =

American baseball player (1901–1968)

- Pitcher
- Born: May 28, 1901; Rochester, New York
- Died: July 17, 1968 (aged 67); Livonia, New York
- Batted: Right Threw: Right

MLB debut
- May 20, 1926, for the Cleveland Indians

Last MLB appearance
- July 15, 1926, for the Cleveland Indians

MLB statistics
- Games pitched: 4
- Earned run average: 3.07
- Stats at Baseball Reference

Teams
- Cleveland Indians (1926)

Norman Carl Michael Lehr (May 28, 1901 – July 17, 1968), nicknamed "King", was a Major League Baseball pitcher who played for one season. He pitched in four games for the Cleveland Indians during the 1926 Cleveland Indians season.
