= Bill Clowers =

American baseball player (1898–1978)

- Pitcher
- Born: August 14, 1898; San Marcos, Texas, U.S.
- Died: January 13, 1978 (aged 79); Sweeny, Texas, U.S.
- Batted: Left Threw: Left

MLB debut
- July 20, 1926, for the Boston Red Sox

Last MLB appearance
- July 21, 1926, for the Boston Red Sox

MLB statistics
- Win–loss record: 0–0
- Earned run average: 0.00
- Strikeouts: 0
- Stats at Baseball Reference

Teams
- Boston Red Sox (1926)

William Perry Clowers (August 14, 1898 – January 13, 1978) was an American professional baseball player. Listed at 5 feet 11 inches (1.80 m) and 175 pounds (79 kg), he batted and threw left-handed.

Born in San Marcos, Texas, (Note: Clowers was born in San Marcos, per Retrosheet. His draft registration cards listed other cities as his birthplace: Commerce, Texas (June 1918 card), and San Antonio, Texas (February 1942 card).) Clower's professional career spanned 1926–1932.

Clowers played briefly for the Boston Red Sox during the 1926 season as a relief pitcher. In two appearances, made on July 20 and 21, Clowers posted a 0.00 earned run average (ERA) without a decision in 1 2/3 innings pitched.

Clowers died in Sweeny, Texas, at the age of 79. He was buried in Rosedale Cemetery in Ada, Oklahoma.
