= Russ Ennis =

American baseball player

Russell Ennis
- Catcher
- Born: March 10, 1897; Superior, Wisconsin, U.S.
- Died: January 21, 1949 (aged 51); Superior, Wisconsin, U.S.
- Batted: Right Threw: Right

MLB debut
- September 19, 1926, for the Washington Senators

Last MLB appearance
- September 19, 1926, for the Washington Senators
- Stats at Baseball Reference

Russell Ennis (born Russell Edward Ennis) (March 10, 1897 – January 21, 1949) was an American Major League Baseball (MLB) catcher. He was a member of the Washington Senators in 1926, appearing in one game.
