= Danny Taylor (baseball) =

American baseball player (1900–1972)

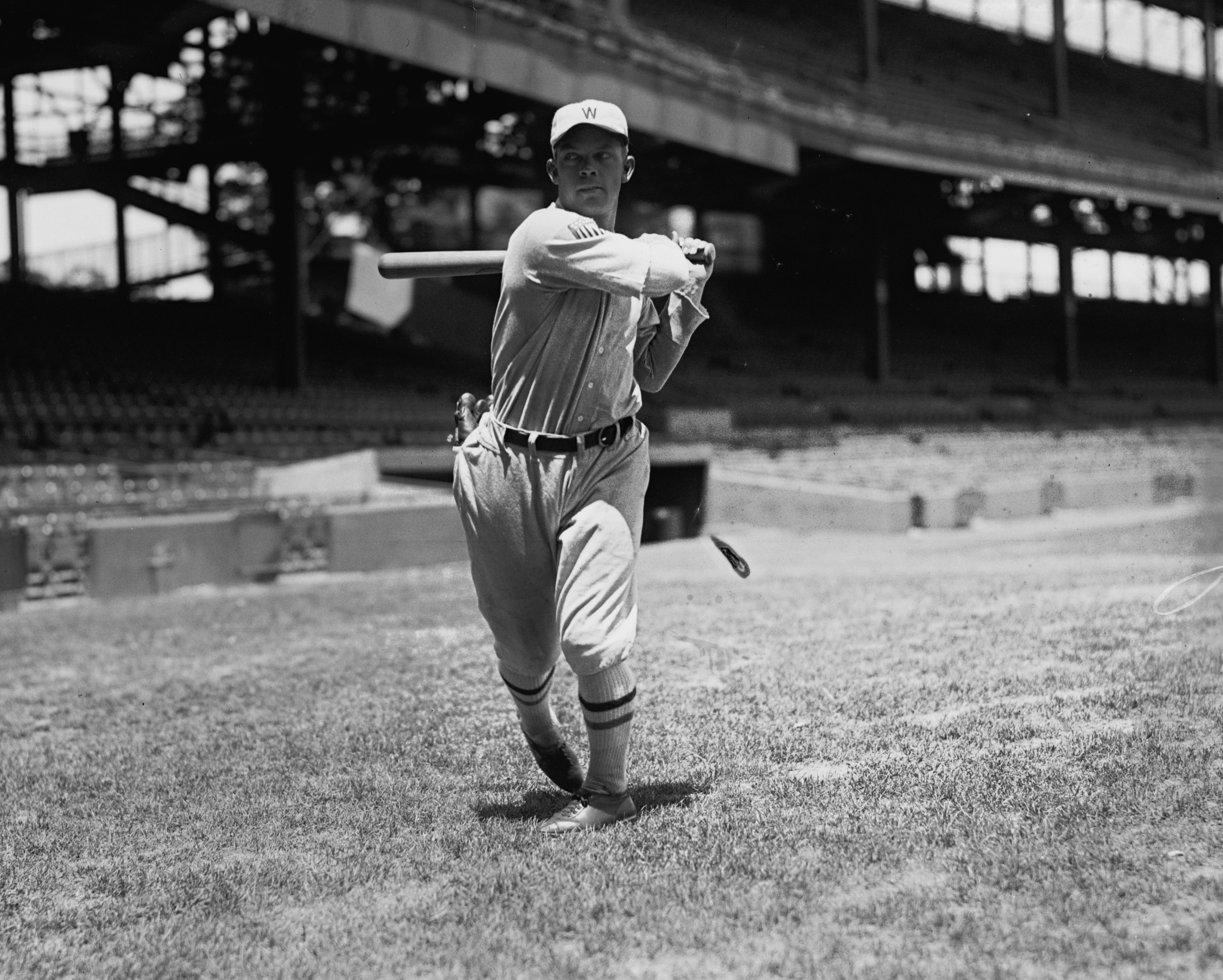
- Outfielder
- Born: December 23, 1900; Lash, Pennsylvania, U.S.
- Died: October 11, 1972 (aged 71); Latrobe, Pennsylvania, U.S.
- Batted: Right Threw: Right

MLB debut
- June 30, 1926, for the Washington Senators

Last MLB appearance
- July 10, 1936, for the Brooklyn Dodgers

MLB statistics
- Batting average: .297
- Home runs: 44
- Runs batted in: 305
- Stats at Baseball Reference

Teams
- Washington Senators (1926); Chicago Cubs (1929–1932); Brooklyn Dodgers (1932–1936)

Daniel Turney Taylor (December 23, 1900 – October 11, 1972) was an American Major League Baseball outfielder from 1926 to 1936. He played with the Washington Senators, Chicago Cubs and Brooklyn Dodgers.

== Formative years and family ==
Born in Lash, Pennsylvania on December 23, 1900, Danny Taylor was a son of Emma Lear Taylor. During the early 1940s, he was a resident of West Newton. His mother died at her home in Lash on August 10, 1941.

== Career ==
In a nine-year career, Taylor hit .297 (650-for-2190) with 44 home runs, 305 RBI, 388 runs scored, an OBP of .374 and a slugging percentage of .446. He hit a career high .319 and scored 87 runs with 11 home runs with the Cubs and Dodgers in 1932. He had 59 RBI in 1935, also a career high.

Taylor was a minor-league manager in 1941 and 1942. He managed the Lansing Senators for part of the 1941 season and the Harrisburg Senators in 1942.

== Death ==
Taylor died at the age of seventy-one on October 11, 1972 in Latrobe, Pennsylvania.
