= Coulter, Pennsylvania =

Unincorporated community in Pennsylvania, US

- Census-designated place
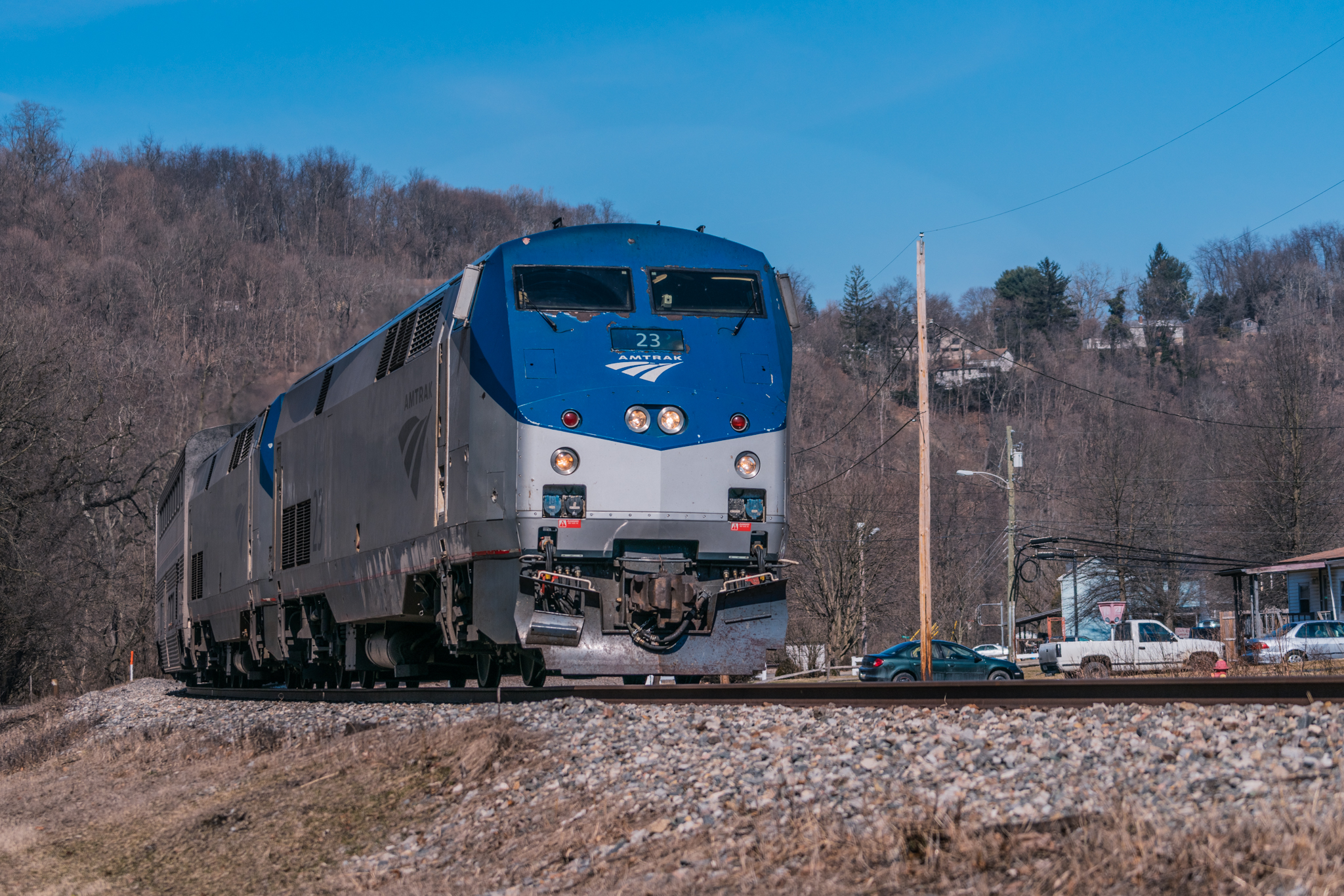
- Amtrak Capitol Limited passing through Coulter in 2019

- Location within Pennsylvania
- Coordinates: 40°17′47″N 79°48′05″W
- Country: United States
- State: Pennsylvania
- County: Allegheny

Area
  - Total: 0.715 sq mi (1.85 km^{2})
  - Land: 0.643 sq mi (1.67 km^{2})
  - Water: 0.072 sq mi (0.19 km^{2})
- Elevation: 778 ft (237 m)
- Time zone: UTC-5 (Eastern (EST))
  - Summer (DST): UTC-4 (EDT)
- ZIP code: 15028
- Area code: 412
- GNIS feature ID: 1172496

Coulter (also known as Coulters, formerly also Coulterville or Coultersville) is an unincorporated community and census-designated place in South Versailles Township, Pennsylvania, United States. The community is located along the Youghiogheny River, 14.3 miles (23.0 km) southeast of Pittsburgh.

The community occupies land warranted in 1787 to Eli Coulter. This land was conveyed by patent in 1855 to Margaret Coulter, who laid out a village in 1858. Coultersville was a coal mining village until early in the 20th century when the local mines were depleted and closed.

Coulter has a post office, with ZIP code 15028. Established in 1864 as Duncan, the post office was renamed Coultersville in 1894 and Coulters in 1900.

== Demographics ==
Historical population
Census	Pop.	Note	%±
2023 (est.)	293

The United States Census Bureau defined Coulter as a census designated place in 2023.

== Transportation ==
The CSX Keystone Subdivision runs through Coulter along a former B&O line that was originally laid by the Pittsburgh and Connellsville Railroad.

== Notable people ==
People born in Coulter include Pittsburgh Steelers founder Art Rooney and baseball player Joe "Moon" Harris.
