= Pat Veltman =

American baseball player (1906–1980)

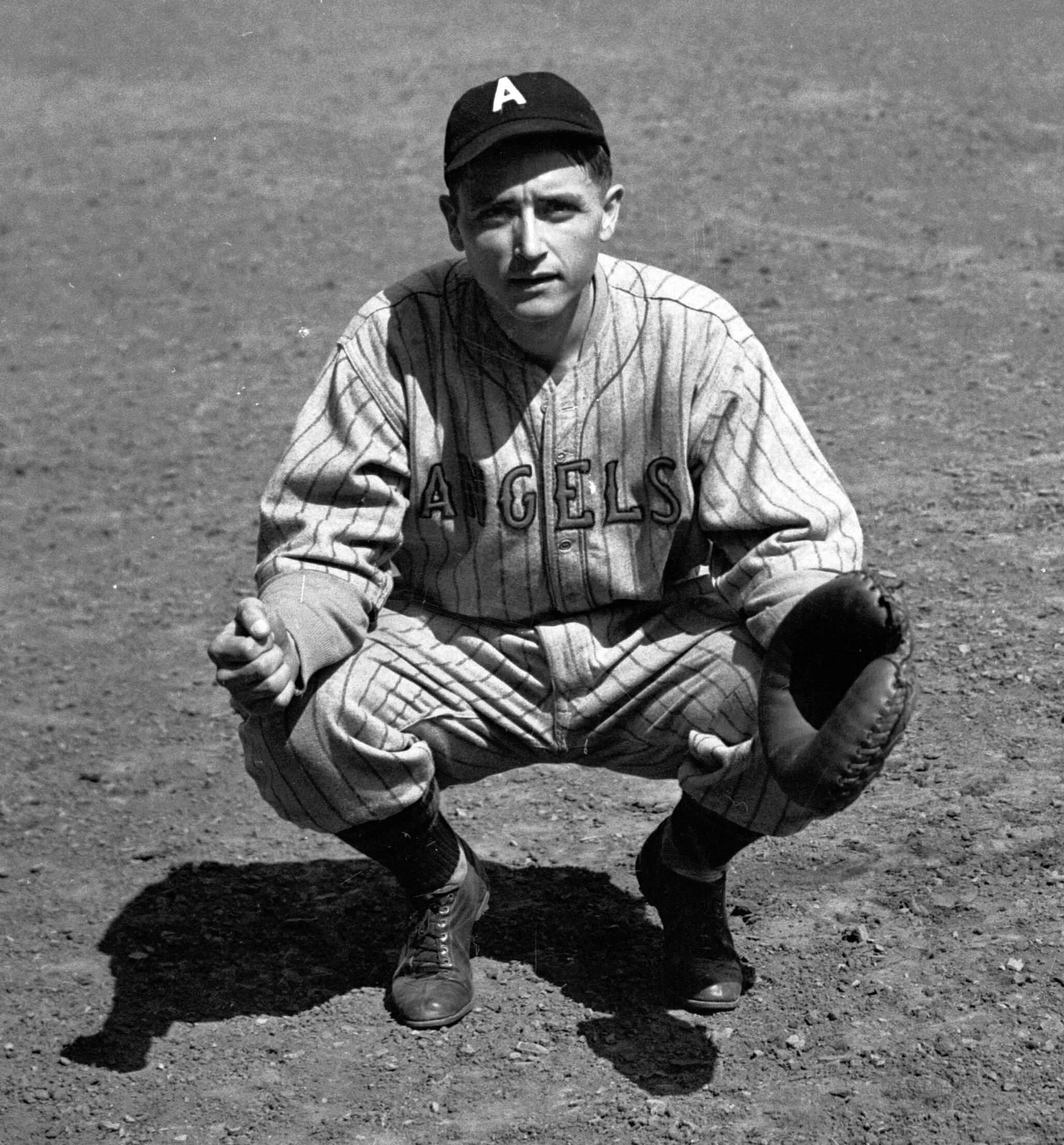
- Veltman with the Los Angeles Angels
- Catcher
- Born: March 24, 1906; Mobile, Alabama, U.S.
- Died: October 1, 1980 (aged 74); San Antonio, Texas, U.S.
- Batted: Right Threw: Right

MLB debut
- April 17, 1926, for the Chicago White Sox

Last MLB appearance
- September 30, 1934, for the Pittsburgh Pirates

MLB statistics
- Batting average: .132
- Home runs: 0
- Runs batted in: 2
- Stats at Baseball Reference

Teams
- Chicago White Sox (1926); New York Giants (1928–1929); Boston Braves (1931); New York Giants (1932); Pittsburgh Pirates (1934)

Arthur Patrick Veltman (March 24, 1906 – October 1, 1980) was an American professional baseball player who played in Major League Baseball from 1926 to 1934. He played for the Chicago White Sox, New York Giants, Boston Braves, and Pittsburgh Pirates. He never played as a starter, the most at bats he collected in one season was 28 in 1934. The other seasons he had less than 4 at-bats, in three seasons he only had 1 at-bat. His career batting average was .132 (5-for-38). His career fielding percentage was 1.000, with no errors in 33 total chances.

== Sources ==
- Career statistics from Baseball Reference · Baseball Reference (Minors) · Retrosheet · Baseball Almanac
