= Les Cox =

American baseball player (1904–1934)

- Pitcher
- Born: August 14, 1904; Junction, Texas
- Died: October 14, 1934 (aged 30); San Angelo, Texas
- Batted: Right Threw: Right

MLB debut
- September 11, 1926, for the Chicago White Sox

Last MLB appearance
- September 26, 1926, for the Chicago White Sox

MLB statistics
- Win–loss record: 0–1
- Strikeouts: 3
- Earned run average: 5.40
- Stats at Baseball Reference

Teams
- Chicago White Sox (1926)

Leslie Warren Cox (August 14, 1904 – October 14, 1934) was an American professional baseball player. A pitcher, he appeared in two games in Major League Baseball in 1926 for the Chicago White Sox.

Cox died at age 30 of complications after undergoing an appendectomy.
