= Spencer Pumpelly (baseball) =

American baseball player

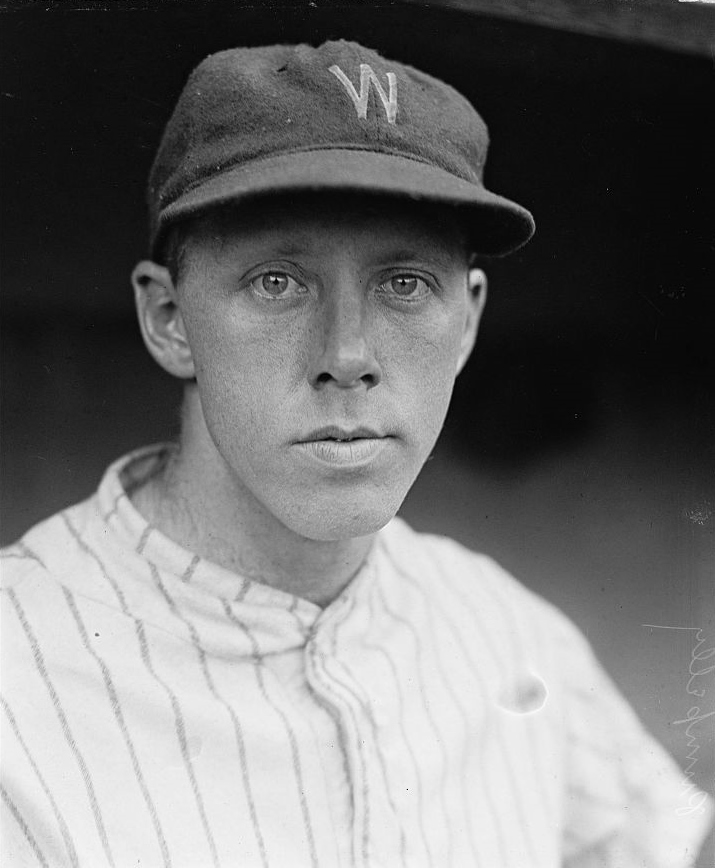
- Pitcher
- Born: April 11, 1893; Owego, New York, U.S.
- Died: July 11, 1973 (aged 80); Sayre, Pennsylvania, U.S.
- Batted: Unknown Threw: Right

MLB debut
- July 11, 1925, for the Washington Senators

Last MLB appearance
- July 11, 1925, for the Washington Senators

MLB statistics
- Games pitched: 1
- Innings pitched: 1.0
- Earned run average: 9.00
- Stats at Baseball Reference

Teams
- Washington Senators (1925)

Spencer Armstrong Pumpelly (April 11, 1893 – December 5, 1973) was an American Major League Baseball pitcher. Pumpelly played in one game for the Washington Senators against the St. Louis Browns on July 11, 1925. He entered in the bottom of the 6th inning, with the Senators trailing the Browns 2–9, and allowed a home run to Marty McManus, walked Baby Doll Jacobson, induced a pop-out from Pinky Hargrave, and induced a 6-4 double-play from Gene Robertson to end the inning. Pumpelly played college baseball at Yale University until he was suspended from the school's athletics program due to questions about his amateur status.
