= Jimmy Uchrinscko =

American baseball player (1900–1995)

- Pitcher
- Born: October 20, 1900; West Newton, Pennsylvania, U.S.
- Died: March 17, 1995 (aged 94); Mount Pleasant, Pennsylvania, U.S.
- Batted: Left Threw: Right

MLB debut
- July 20, 1927, for the Washington Senators

Last MLB appearance
- July 27, 1927, for the Washington Senators

MLB statistics
- Win–loss record: 0–0
- Strikeouts: 0
- Earned run average: 10.13
- Stats at Baseball Reference

Teams
- Washington Senators (1926)

James Emerson Uchrinscko (October 20, 1900 – March 17, 1995) was an American Major League Baseball pitcher. He appeared in three games for the Washington Senators in 1926. He batted left-handed and threw right-handed. His height was 6 feet 0 inches (1.83 m), and he weighed 180 pounds (82 kg). He made his major league debut on July 20, and his final game was 7 days later on July 27, 1926. He was born in West Newton, Pennsylvania, on October 20, 1900, and he died on March 17, 1995, in Mount Pleasant, Pennsylvania.
