= Frank Loftus =

American baseball player (1898-1980)

- Pitcher
- Born: March 10, 1898; Scranton, Pennsylvania, U.S.
- Died: October 27, 1980 (aged 82); Belchertown, Massachusetts, U.S.
- Batted: Right Threw: Right

MLB debut
- September 26, 1926, for the Washington Senators

Last MLB appearance
- September 26, 1926, for the Washington Senators

MLB statistics
- Games played: 1
- Innings pitched: 1
- Earned run average: 9.00
- Stats at Baseball Reference

Teams
- Washington Senators (1926)

Francis Patrick Loftus (March 10, 1898 – October 27, 1980) was an American pitcher in Major League Baseball. He played for the Washington Senators in 1926.
