= Bud Connolly =

American baseball player (1901–1964)

- Shortstop
- Born: May 25, 1901; San Francisco, California, U.S.
- Died: June 12, 1964 (aged 63); Berkeley, California, U.S.
- Batted: Right Threw: Right

MLB debut
- May 3, 1925, for the Boston Red Sox

Last MLB appearance
- July 28, 1925, for the Boston Red Sox

MLB statistics
- Batting average: .262
- Home runs: 0
- Runs batted in: 21
- Stats at Baseball Reference

Teams
- Boston Red Sox (1925)

Mervin Thomas "Bud" Connolly (May 25, 1901 – June 12, 1964) was an American shortstop in Major League Baseball who played for the Boston Red Sox in the 1925 season. Connolly batted and threw right-handed. He was born in San Francisco, California.

In a 43-game career, Connolly was a .262 hitter (28-for-107) with 12 runs, seven doubles, and one triple without home runs.

Connolly died in Berkeley, California, at the age of 63.
