= Dick Jones (baseball) =

American baseball player (1902-1994)

Decature Dick Jones
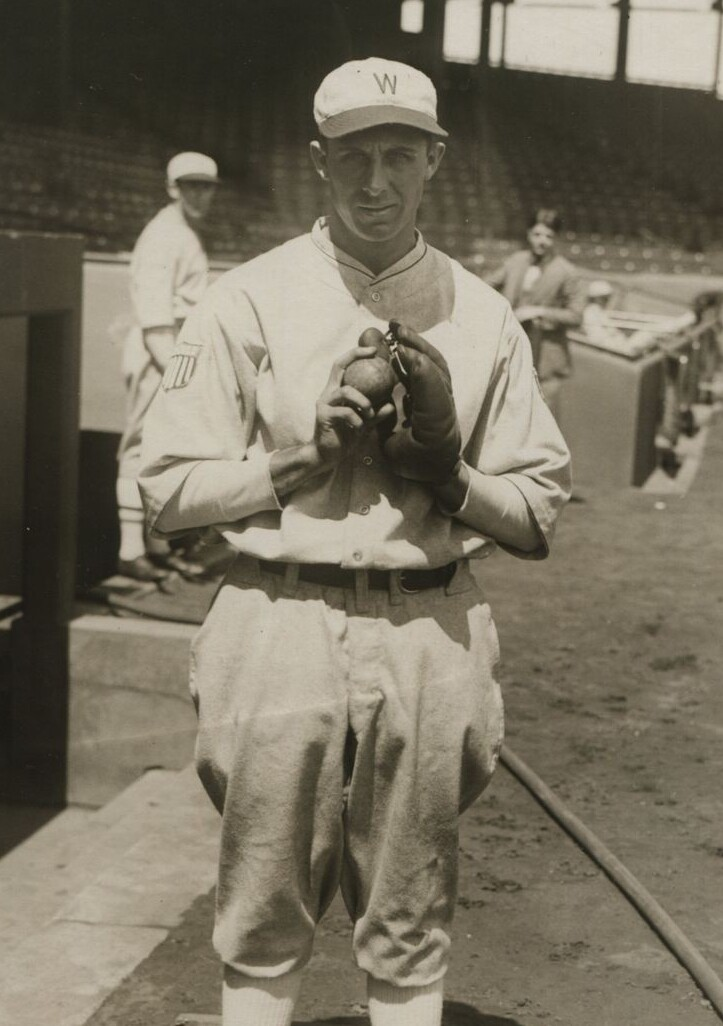
- Pitcher
- Born: May 22, 1902; Meadville, Mississippi, U.S.
- Died: August 2, 1994 (aged 92); Burlingame, California, U.S.
- Batted: Left Threw: Right

MLB debut
- September 11, 1926, for the Washington Senators

Last MLB appearance
- April 28, 1927, for the Washington Senators

MLB statistics
- Win–loss record: 2-1
- Earned run average: 6.66
- Strikeouts: 4
- Stats at Baseball Reference

Teams
- Washington Senators (1926–1927)

Decature Poindexter "Dick" Jones (May 22, 1902 – August 2, 1994) was an American Major League Baseball pitcher who played for the Washington Senators in 1926 and 1927.
