= Frank McGee (baseball) =

American baseball player (1899-1934)

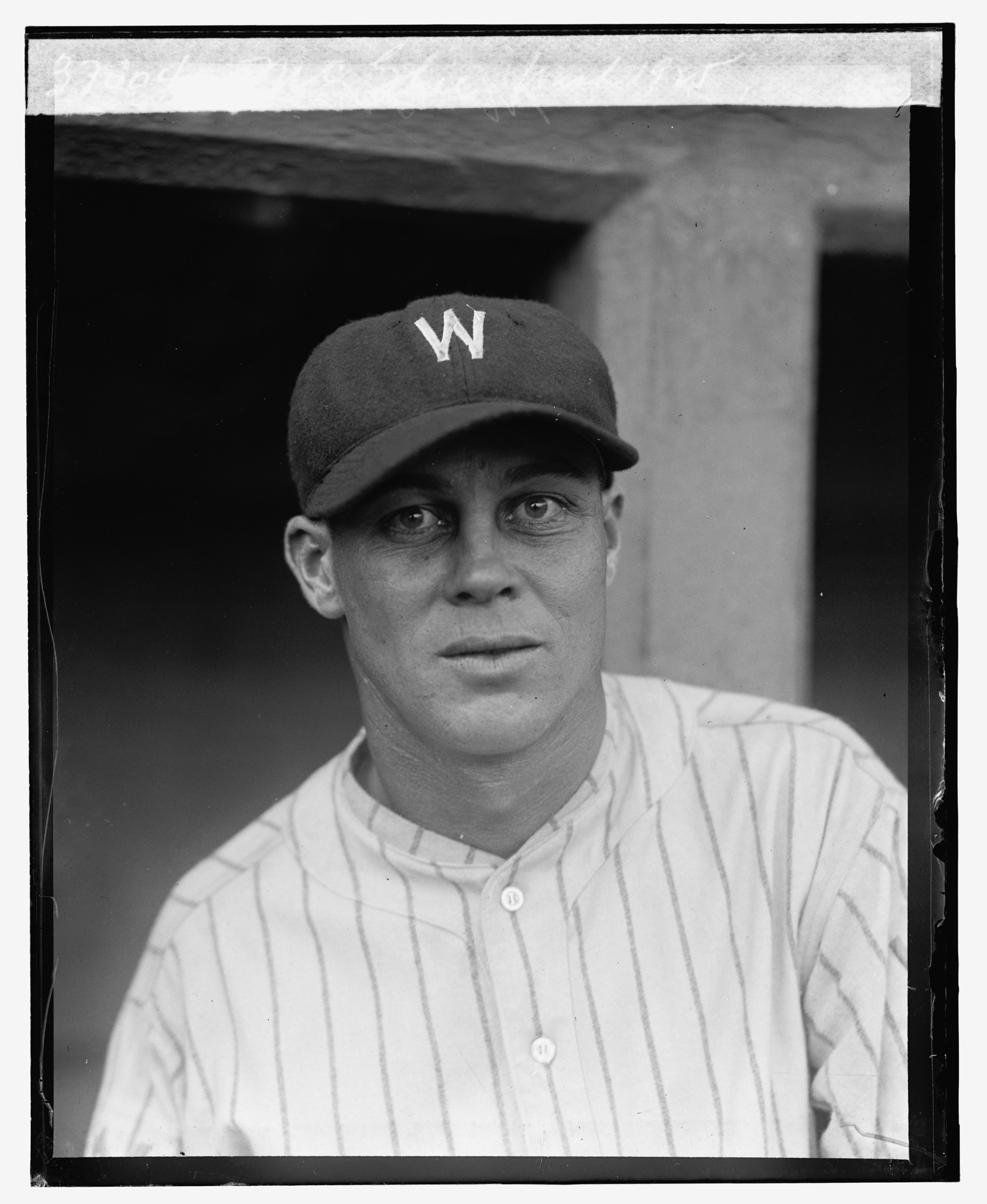
- First baseman
- Born: April 29, 1899; Columbus, Ohio
- Died: January 30, 1934 (aged 34); Columbus, Ohio
- Batted: Right Threw: Right

MLB debut
- September 19, 1925, for the Washington Senators

Last MLB appearance
- September 30, 1925, for the Washington Senators

MLB statistics
- Games played: 2
- At bats: 3
- Hits: 0
- Stats at Baseball Reference

Teams
- Washington Senators (1925)

Francis D. "Frank" McGee (April 29, 1899 – January 30, 1934) was a Major League Baseball first baseman who played in two games for the Washington Senators in 1925.
