= Denny Williams =

American baseball player (1896–1929)

- Outfielder
- Born: December 13, 1896; Portland, Oregon
- Died: March 23, 1929 (aged 32); San Clemente, California
- Batted: Left Threw: Right

MLB debut
- April 15, 1921, for the Cincinnati Reds

Last MLB appearance
- July 18, 1928, for the Boston Red Sox

MLB statistics
- Batting average: .259
- Hits: 85
- Runs batted in: 18
- Stats at Baseball Reference

Teams
- Cincinnati Reds (1921); Boston Red Sox (1924–1925, 1928)

Evon Daniel "Denny" Williams (December 13, 1896 – March 23, 1929) was a professional baseball player whose career spanned eight seasons, three of which were spent in Major League Baseball (MLB) with the Cincinnati Reds (1921) and Boston Red Sox (1924–25, 1928). Over his MLB career, Williams batted .259 with 46 runs scored, 85 hits, four doubles, three triples, and 18 runs batted in (RBIs) in 120 games played.

Williams spent the majority of his career in the minor leagues with the Moose Jaw Robin Hoods (1920), Joplin Miners (1921), Mobile Bears (1922–24, 1926–27) and Baltimore Orioles (1928). During spring training in 1929, Williams was a member of the minor league Portland Beavers when he was killed in an automobile accident. He stood at 5 feet 8 inches (173 cm) and weighed 150 pounds (68 kg). Williams batted left-handed, while throwing right.

== Early and personal life ==
Evon Daniel "Denny" Williams was born on December 13, 1896, in Portland, Oregon. His father, Daniel Williams, who was from Ohio, worked for the Glaser Glass Company in Portland. Denny Williams had six siblings: sisters Mary, Sarah and Catherine; and brothers John, William and Thomas. In October 1925, Denny Williams married Thelma Elizabeth Duff of Boston, Massachusetts.

== Professional career ==
=== Early minor league career and Cincinnati Reds (1920–23) ===
Before the start of the 1920 season, Williams was signed by the minor league Moose Jaw Robin Hoods of the Class-B Western Canada League. On the season, he batted .322 with 158 hits in 117 games played. He finished second in the league in hits behind Chicken Hawks. At the end of the season, the Major League Baseball (MLB) Cincinnati Reds purchased Williams from the Moose Jaw club. On March 5, 1921, Williams reported to spring training with the Reds. During spring training, he played right field for the first time in his career. Towards the end of spring training, the United Press International speculated that Williams would the Reds' starting outfielder going into the regular season. He made the Cincinnati club out of spring training. On April 15, Williams made his MLB debut as a pinch hitter against the Pittsburgh Pirates. Six of Williams' appearances with the Reds that season were as a pinch hitter and four of them were as a pinch runner. Defensively, he played one game in left field. Williams' last MLB appearance of the season came on June 1, against the St. Louis Cardinals. With the Red that year, he went hitless with two strikeouts in seven games played.

In June 1921, Williams was farmed out by the Cincinnati Reds to the minor league Joplin Miners of the Class-A Western League. With the Miners, he batted .320 with 65 hits, six doubles, six triples and one home run in 56 games played. On July 29, Williams was released by the Joplin club. At the start of the 1922 season, Williams signed with the Mobile Bears of the Class-A Southern Association. On September 25, Williams hit a home run in the tenth inning, which gave Mobile the win against Fort Worth Panthers in the 1922 Dixie Series. The Mobile club won the Dixie Series that season. Williams batted .298 with 187 hits with 25 doubles, seven triples and four home runs in 137 games played that season. He was tied for third with Snake Henry in hits in the Southern Association. He returned to the Mobile Bears in 1923. On the season, he batted .328 with 212 hits, 33 doubles, four triples and one home runs in 160 games played. He led the Southern Association in hits.

=== Boston Red Sox and later career (1924–28) ===
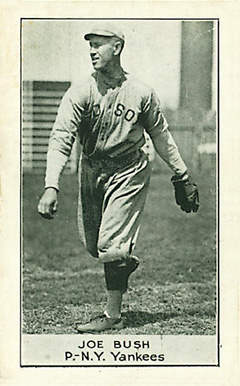
Williams got his first MLB hit off of Bullet Joe Bush (pictured) in 1924.

At the start of the 1924 season, Williams re-signed with the minor league Mobile Bears of the Class-A Southern Association. However, early in the season he was purchased by the MLB Boston Red Sox to be used as a reserve outfielder. He made his season debut as a pinch runner on April 23, against the New York Yankees. In that game, Williams scored a run. After three games in the majors that year, he was sent back down to the Mobile club. With the Bears that season, he batted .327 with 159 hits, 18 doubles, three triples, and three home runs in 120 games played. On August 27, Williams was recalled by the Red Sox. On September 8, in a game against the New York Yankees, Williams got his first MLB hit, a double, off of Bullet Joe Bush. Williams got four hits in five at-bats in on September 9, against the New York Yankees. On the season with Boston that season, Williams batted .365 with 17 runs scored, 31 hits, three doubles, four runs batted in (RBIs), three stolen bases, and 10 base on balls in 25 games played. He returned to the Red Sox in 1925. With Boston, he batted .229 with 28 runs scored, 50 hits, one double, three triples, and 13 RBIs in 69 games played.

On January 21, 1926, Williams was sold to the minor league Mobile Bears. On the season, he batted .352 with 215 hits 32 doubles, five triples, and two home runs in 155 games played. Williams finished second in the league in hits. He returned to the Mobile club in 1927. With the Bears that season, he batted .350 with 223 hits, 24 doubles, eight triples and two home runs in 157 games played. He led the Southern Association in hits that season. Williams spent spring training in 1928 with the Boston Red Sox and was expected to be the starting outfielder. His last MLB appearance came as a pinch hitter on July 18, against the Cleveland Indians. He had an appendix operation which caused him to miss some playing time that season. With the Red Sox that season, he batted .222 with one run scored, four hits and one RBI in 16 games played. After playing with the Red Sox in 1928, Williams joined the minor league Baltimore Orioles of the Double-A International League. On the season, he batted .313 with 47 hits, six doubles, two triples and one home run in 39 games played. In December 1928, Williams was sold by the Boston Red Sox to the minor league Portland Beavers of the Double-A Pacific Coast League.

== Death ==
On March 23, 1929, Williams was returning to Portland, Oregon from spring training in San Diego with his Portland Beavers teammates when he was killed in an automobile accident. Two other players, Mack Hillis and Yats Wuestling, who were also in the vehicle were seriously injured. In total, six Beavers players were making the trip when their vehicle was hit by another causing them to veer off into an embankment. Williams was buried at Mount Calvary Cemetery in his home-town of Portland.
