= Oscar Fuhr =

American baseball player (1893–1975)

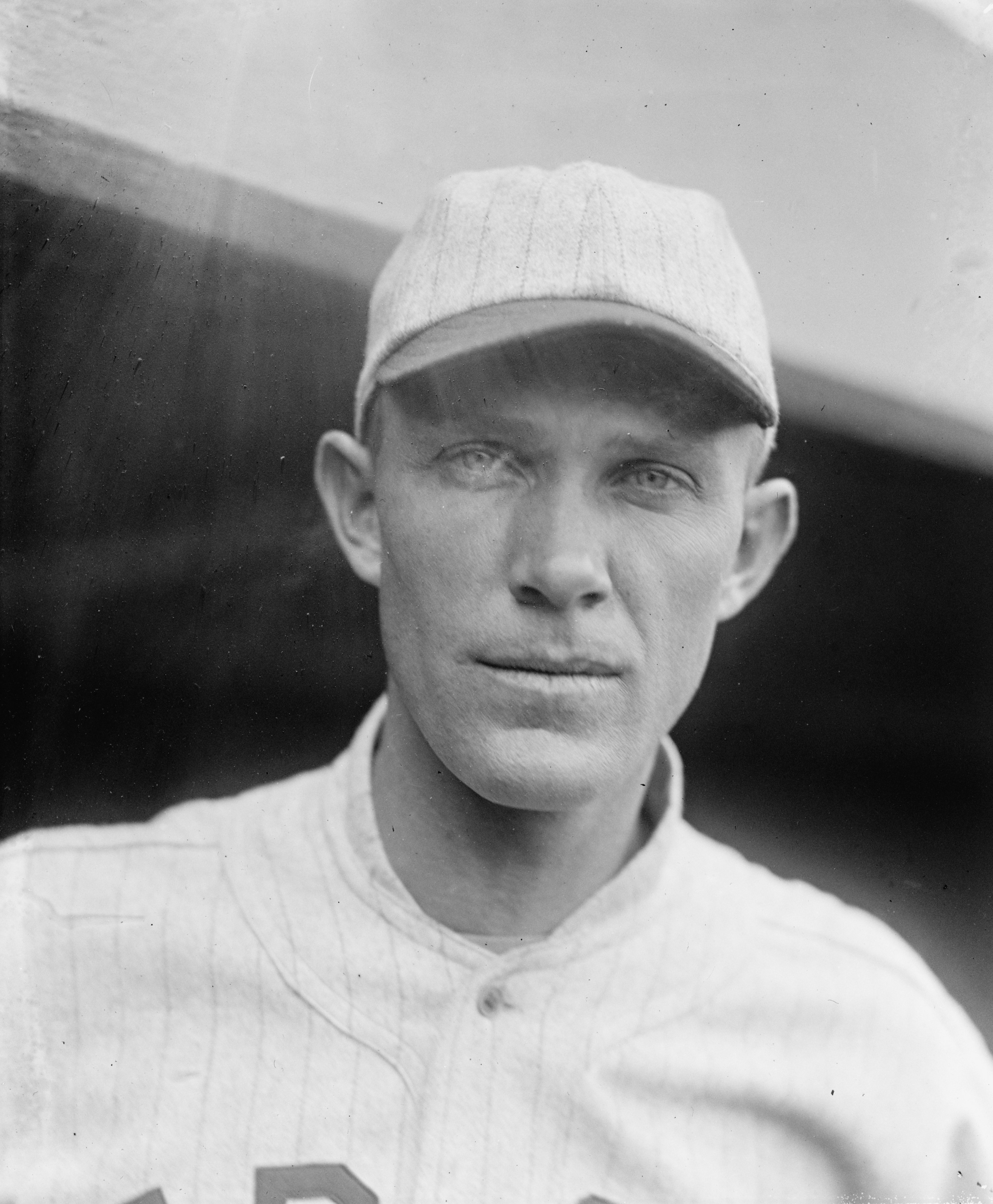
- Pitcher
- Born: August 22, 1893; Defiance, Missouri, U.S.
- Died: March 27, 1975 (aged 81); Dallas, Texas, U.S.
- Batted: Left Threw: Left

MLB debut
- April 19, 1921, for the Chicago Cubs

Last MLB appearance
- September 26, 1925, for the Boston Red Sox

MLB statistics
- Win–loss record: 3–12
- Earned run average: 6.35
- Strikeouts: 59
- Stats at Baseball Reference

Teams
- Chicago Cubs (1921); Boston Red Sox (1924–1925)

Oscar Lawrence Fuhr (August 22, 1893 – March 27, 1975) was an American pitcher in Major League Baseball who played between 1921 and 1925 for the Chicago Cubs (1921) and Boston Red Sox (1924–25). Listed at 6 ft 0 in (1.83 m), 176 lb., Fuhr batted and threw left-handed. He was born in Defiance, Missouri.

In a three-season career, Fuhr posted a 3–12 record with 59 strikeouts and a 6.35 ERA in 63 appearances, including 16 starts, four complete games, one shutout, 28 games finished, 69 walks, and 175 2/3 innings of work.

Fuhr died in Dallas, Texas at age 81.

== Sources ==
- Career statistics from Baseball Reference · Retrosheet · Baseball Almanac
- Retrosheet
