= Joe Lucey =

American baseball player (1897–1980)

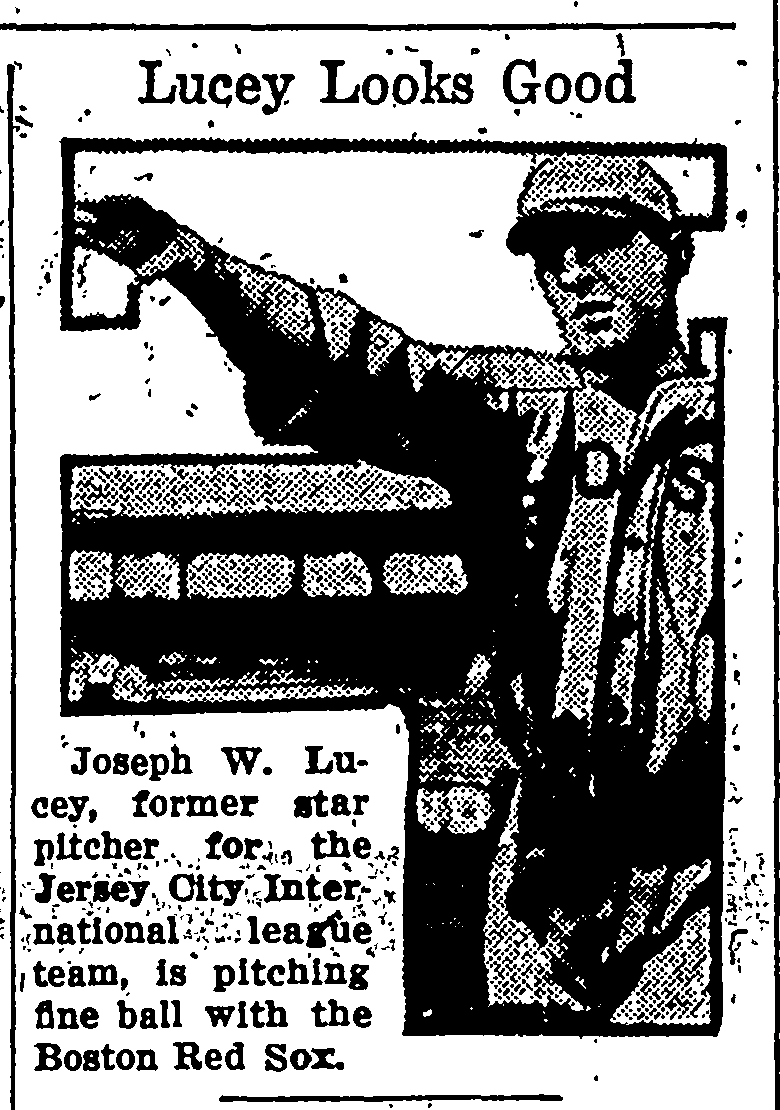
- Pitcher / Shortstop
- Born: March 27, 1897; Holyoke, Massachusetts, U.S.
- Died: July 30, 1980 (aged 83); Holyoke, Massachusetts, U.S.
- Batted: Right Threw: Right

MLB debut
- July 6, 1920, for the New York Yankees

Last MLB appearance
- June 25, 1925, for the Boston Red Sox

MLB statistics
- Win–loss record: 0-1
- Earned run average: 9.00
- Batting average: .111
- Stats at Baseball Reference

Teams
- New York Yankees (1920); Boston Red Sox (1925)

Joseph Earl Lucey [Scootch] (March 27, 1897 – July 30, 1980) was an American pitcher / shortstop in Major League Baseball. Listed at 6 ft 0 in (1.83 m), 168 lb., Lucey batted and threw right-handed. He was born in Holyoke, Massachusetts.

Lucey entered the majors in 1920 with the New York Yankees, appearing for them in two games at shortstop and second base before joining the Boston Red Sox in 1925. While in Boston, he also pitched in seven games, including two starts. He was a .111 hitter (2-for-18) in 13 games. As a pitcher, he posted a 0–1 record with a 9.00 earned run average in 11.0 innings of work.

Lucey died in his hometown of Holyoke, Massachusetts, at age 83.
