= Alex Metzler =

American baseball player (1903–1973)

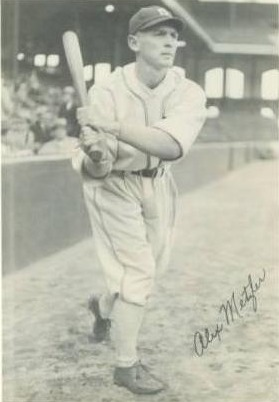
- Outfielder
- Born: January 4, 1903; Fresno, California, U.S.
- Died: November 30, 1973 (aged 70); Fresno, California, U.S.
- Batted: Left Threw: Right

MLB debut
- September 16, 1925, for the Chicago Cubs

Last MLB appearance
- September 28, 1930, for the St. Louis Browns

MLB statistics
- Batting average: .285
- Home runs: 9
- Runs batted in: 206
- Stats at Baseball Reference

Teams
- Chicago Cubs (1925); Philadelphia Athletics (1926); Chicago White Sox (1927–1930); St. Louis Browns (1930)

Alexander Metzler (January 4, 1903 – November 30, 1973) was an American outfielder in Major League Baseball from 1925 to 1930. He played for the Chicago Cubs, Philadelphia Athletics, Chicago White Sox, and St. Louis Browns.

In 560 games over six seasons, Metzler posted a .285 batting average (561-for-1968) with 290 runs, 85 doubles, 41 triples, 9 home runs, 206 RBI, 45 stolen bases, 260 bases on balls, .374 on-base percentage and .384 slugging percentage. He finished his career with a .965 fielding percentage playing at all three outfield positions.
