= Jim Lyle =

American baseball player (1900-1977)

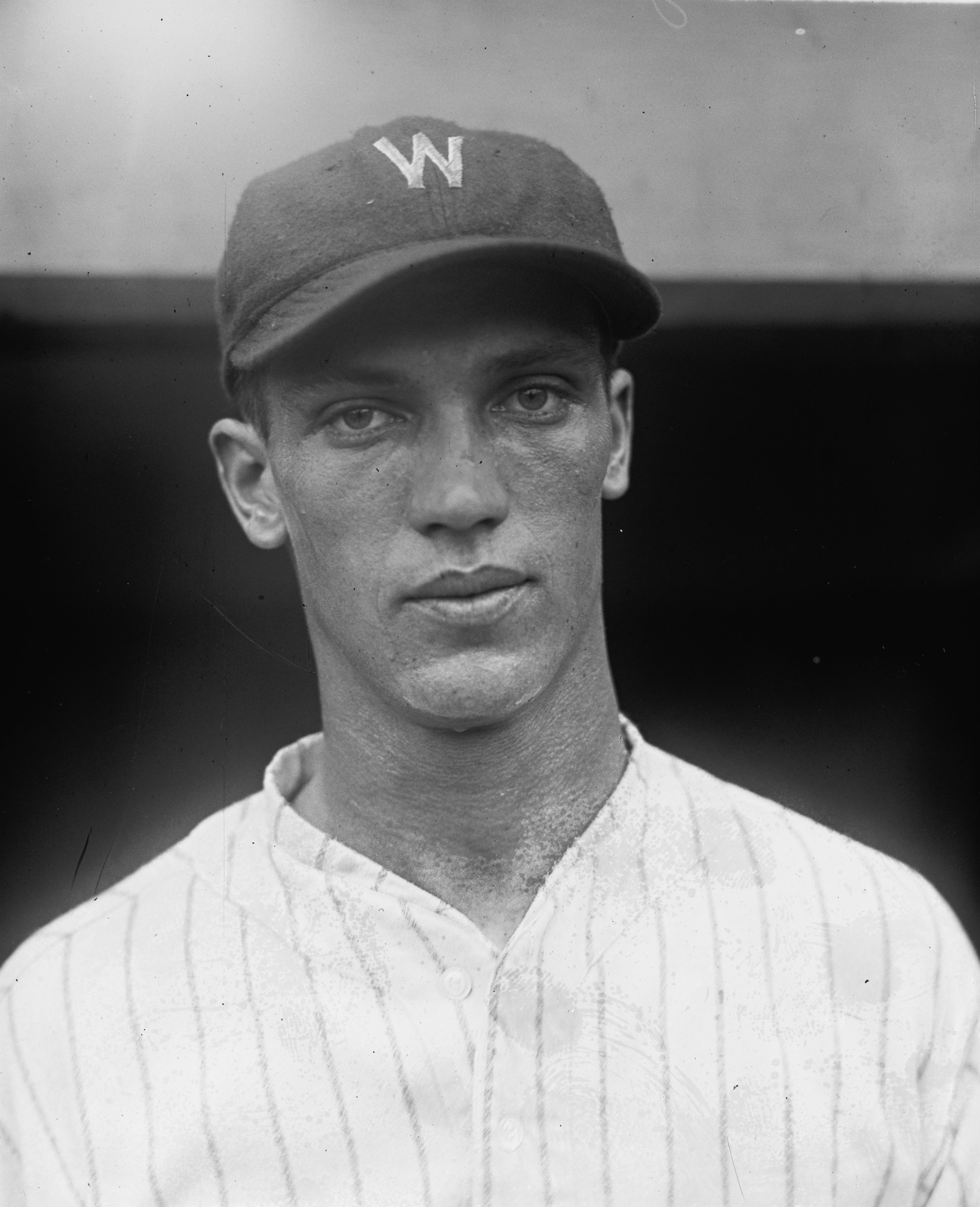
- Pitcher
- Born: July 24, 1900; Lake, Mississippi, U.S.
- Died: October 10, 1977 (aged 77); Williamsport, Pennsylvania, U.S.
- Batted: Right Threw: Right

MLB debut
- October 2, 1925, for the Washington Senators

Last MLB appearance
- October 2, 1925, for the Washington Senators

MLB statistics
- Win–loss record: 0–0
- Earned run average: 6.00
- Strikeouts: 3
- Stats at Baseball Reference

Teams
- Washington Senators (1925)

James Charles Lyle (July 24, 1900 – October 10, 1977) was an American professional baseball player. He was a right-handed pitcher for one season (1925) with the Washington Senators. For his career, he did not record a decision and compiled a 6.00 earned run average with 3 strikeouts in 3 innings pitched.

An alumnus of Mississippi State University, he was born in Lake, Mississippi and died in Williamsport, Pennsylvania at the age of 76.
