= Jack Quinn (baseball) =

American baseball player (1883–1946)

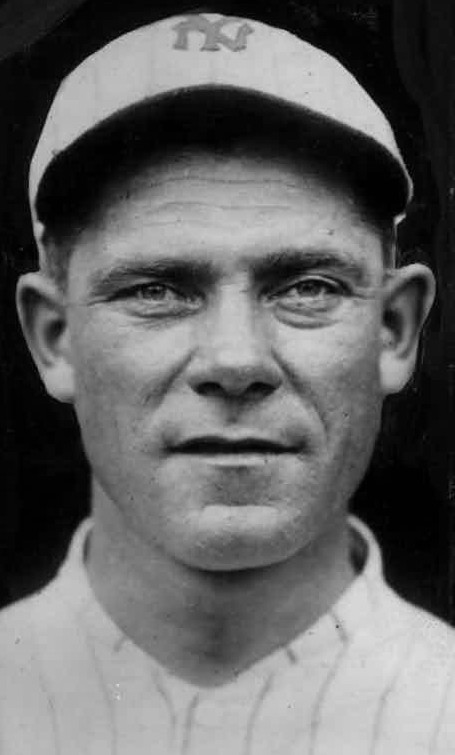
- Quinn in 1921
- Pitcher
- Born: July 1, 1883; Štefurov, Austria-Hungary
- Died: April 17, 1946 (aged 62); Pottsville, Pennsylvania, U.S.
- Batted: Right Threw: Right

Major league debut
- April 15, 1909, for the New York Highlanders

Last major league appearance
- July 7, 1933, for the Cincinnati Reds

Major league statistics
- Win–loss record: 247–218
- Earned run average: 3.29
- Strikeouts: 1,329
- Saves: 56
- Stats at Baseball Reference

Teams
- New York Highlanders (1909–1912); Boston Braves (1913); Baltimore Terrapins (1914–1915); Chicago White Sox (1918); New York Yankees (1919–1921); Boston Red Sox (1922–1925); Philadelphia Athletics (1925–1930); Brooklyn Robins / Dodgers (1931–1932); Cincinnati Reds (1933)

Career highlights and awards
- 2× World Series champion (1929, 1930)

John Picus Quinn (born Joannes "Jan" Pajkos, July 1, 1883 – April 17, 1946) was an American professional baseball player. He played as a pitcher for eight teams in three major leagues (the American, Federal, and National), most notably as a member of the Philadelphia Athletics dynasty that won three consecutive American League pennants from 1929 to 1931, and won the World Series in 1929 and 1930. Quinn made his final major league appearance at the age of 50.

== Biography ==
Born in Štefurov, Austria-Hungary (modern-day Štefurov, Slovakia), Quinn emigrated to America as an infant with his parents Michael Pajkos and Maria Dzjiacsko, arriving in New York on June 18, 1884. His mother died near Hazleton, Pennsylvania, shortly after the family's arrival in the US, and Quinn's father moved the family to Buck Mountain, near Mahanoy City, Pennsylvania. In 1887 Quinn's father remarried, to Anastasia ("Noska") Tzar.

Quinn spent his early years working as a swimmer and blacksmith, while playing recreational ball for mining teams. He got his start as a professional in an unusual way. While watching a semi-pro game in Connellsville, the 14-year-old Quinn threw a foul ball back from the stands to the catcher, hitting his mitt right in the middle. The visiting manager, from the nearby town of Dunbar, was impressed by the throw, and he offered Quinn a contract.

Quinn went on to spend 23 seasons in the major leagues with eight different teams. He won 247 games and lost 218 games, also collecting 57 saves. Quinn debuted on April 15, 1909, and he played until he was 50 years old; his final game was on July 7, 1933. Quinn's professional longevity enabled him to achieve several age-related milestones. He was the oldest major league player to win a game until Jamie Moyer broke the record on April 17, 2012. Quinn is also the oldest to lead his league in a major category (saves, in 1932—although that statistic was not yet created in that era, and was only retroactively awarded in 1969). He is furthermore the oldest pitcher to start games in the World Series (with the Philadelphia Athletics, in 1929) and on Opening Day (with the Brooklyn Dodgers, in 1931). He was the oldest player to hit a home run in the majors, at age 46, until 47-year-old Julio Franco did so in 2006. He remains the oldest major league pitcher to hit a home run. He was the oldest person to ever play for the Cincinnati Reds, and at the time of his retirement, the eight teams for which he had played also constituted a record, which has since been broken. He was also the last major leaguer who had played in the 1900s decade to formally retire (not counting Charley O'Leary, who in 1934 made a comeback stint). Quinn is one of only 31 players in baseball history to date who have appeared in a major league game in four decades. He remains the oldest player to play regularly, having pitched 87 1/3 innings in 1932 at age 48 and 49, and 15 innings in 1933 at age 49 and 50. (Franco and Phil Niekro were also regular players at age 48, but were one and five months younger, respectively, during their seasons at that age.)

During his career, Quinn played alongside 31 different members of the Baseball Hall of Fame and collected two World Series rings in three tries. He was also one of the last pitchers in baseball permitted to throw the spitball, grandfathered in along with sixteen others reliant on the pitch when it was banned in 1920. He frequently used his spitball after he was grandfathered in, in addition to his fastball, curve, and changeup.

Quinn posted a .184 batting average (248-for-1349) with 90 runs, 38 doubles, eight home runs, 115 runs batted in and drawing 89 bases on balls. He recorded a .969 fielding percentage including playing several games in the outfield.

Quinn died in Pottsville, Pennsylvania on April 17, 1946, three months after being diagnosed with a liver infection. His wife died on July 9, 1940 in Dolton, Illinois due to injuries related to a fall and necessary amputation of her right leg.

In 2006, Jack Quinn was inducted into the National Polish-American Sports Hall of Fame.

== See also ==
- List of Major League Baseball career wins leaders
- List of Major League Baseball annual saves leaders
- List of Major League Baseball players who played in four decades
- List of Major League Baseball career hit batsmen leaders

Preceded by Watty Clark	Brooklyn Robins/Dodgers Opening Day; Starting pitcher 1931	Succeeded by Waite Hoyt
