= Lefty Thomas =

American baseball player (1903-1952)

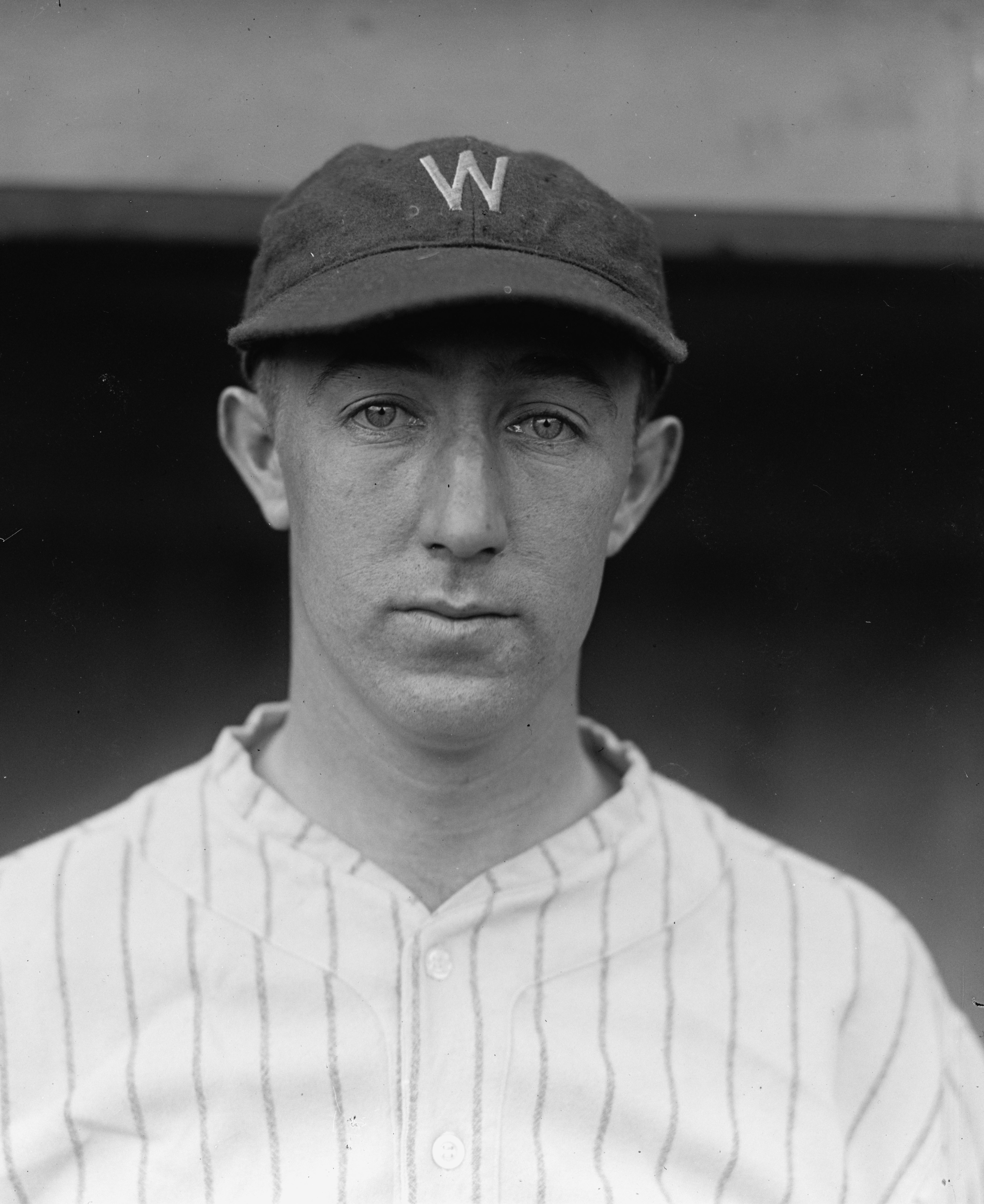
- Pitcher
- Born: October 4, 1903; Glade Spring, Virginia
- Died: March 21, 1952 (aged 48); Charlottesville, Virginia
- Batted: Left Threw: Left

MLB debut
- September 26, 1925, for the Washington Senators

Last MLB appearance
- September 26, 1926, for the Washington Senators

MLB statistics
- Win–loss record: 0-2
- Earned run average: 3.32
- Strikeouts: 13
- Stats at Baseball Reference

Teams
- Washington Senators (1925–1926)

Clarence Fletcher "Lefty" Thomas (October 4, 1903 – March 21, 1952) was a pitcher in Major League Baseball. He played for the Washington Senators in 1925 and 1926.
