= Mike Herrera (baseball) =

Cuban baseball player (1892–1978)

- Third baseman / Second baseman / Right fielder
- Born: December 19, 1892; Havana, Cuba
- Died: February 3, 1978 (aged 85); Havana, Cuba
- Batted: Right Threw: Right

Professional debut
- NgL: 1920, for the Cuban Stars West
- MLB: September 22, 1925, for the Boston Red Sox

Last NgL appearance
- 1928, for the Cuban Stars East

MLB statistics
- Batting average: .271
- Home runs: 1
- Runs batted in: 85
- Stats at Baseball Reference

Teams
- Cuban Stars West (1920); Cincinnati Cuban Stars (1921); Boston Red Sox (1925–1926); Cuban Stars East (1928)

Ramón Herrera (December 19, 1892 – February 3, 1978) was a Cuban professional baseball player. He is notable for being one of the first men to play in both Major League Baseball (MLB) and the Negro leagues, more than two decades before Jackie Robinson officially broke the color line and integrated the majors.

A third baseman, second baseman and right fielder in Major League Baseball (MLB) and the Negro leagues, Herrera was listed at 5 feet 6 inches (1.68 m) tall and 147 pounds (67 kg) and batted and threw right-handed. Born in Havana, Cuba, he made his professional debut with Almendares, under manager Eugenio Santa Cruz, in the 1913-14 season. He played for the Cuban Stars (West) of the Negro National League in 1920 and 1921, and for the Cuban Stars (East) of the Eastern Colored League in 1928.

He joined the Boston Red Sox in September 1925, appearing in 10 games while hitting a .385 batting average, but he hit only .257 in 74 games in 1926. In his career with the Red Sox, Herrera was a .275 hitter (76-for-276) with 22 runs and 27 RBI in 84 appearances, including 14 doubles, one triple, and one stolen base. He did not hit a home run.

Herrera also played for many seasons in the Cuban Winter League.

He was enshrined in the Cuban Baseball Hall of Fame in 1963. He died in his home city of Havana at age 85.

== Bibliography ==
- "Mike Herrera". SABR. Society for American Baseball Research.
