= Joe Harris (first baseman) =

American baseball player (1891–1959)

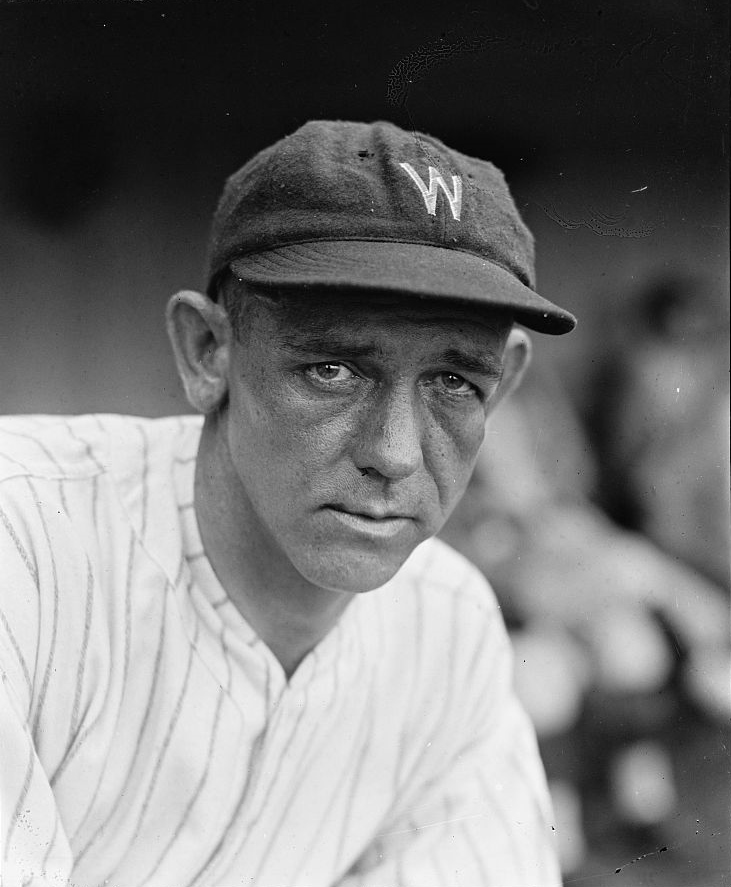
- Harris in 1925
- First baseman
- Born: May 20, 1891; Coulter, Pennsylvania, U.S.
- Died: December 10, 1959 (aged 68); Plum, Pennsylvania, U.S.
- Batted: Switch Threw: Right

MLB debut
- June 9, 1914, for the New York Yankees

Last MLB appearance
- September 25, 1928, for the Brooklyn Robins

MLB statistics
- Batting average: .317
- Home runs: 47
- Runs batted in: 516
- Stats at Baseball Reference

Teams
- New York Yankees (1914); Cleveland Indians (1917, 1919); Boston Red Sox (1922–1925); Washington Senators (1925–1926); Pittsburgh Pirates (1927–1928); Brooklyn Robins (1928)

Joseph Harris (May 20, 1891 – December 10, 1959), nicknamed "Moon", was an American professional baseball first baseman. He played for ten seasons in Major League Baseball (MLB) between 1914 and 1928 for the New York Yankees, Cleveland Indians, Boston Red Sox, Washington Senators, Pittsburgh Pirates, and Brooklyn Robins.

== Life ==
Harris was born in Coulter, Pennsylvania.

In 1918, Harris was drafted into the United States Army. He served during World War I and was in a truck accident while serving. Harris suffered two broken legs, three broken ribs and a fractured skull, thus creating the 'lump' under his eye. He did need plastic surgery to help fix his facial injury. In 1919, Harris was discharged due to injury from the army and returned to the Cleveland Indians for part of the season. At the season's end, he played for an industrial team, which offered him money and a business. Harris played with the team for the 1920 and 1921 seasons. By violating the reserve clause in his 1919 contract, Harris automatically was placed on organized baseball's ineligible list.

Prior to the 1922 season, Harris applied for and was granted reinstatement by baseball commissioner Kenesaw Mountain Landis, in part due to Harris' war service. In 1923, he led the Red Sox with a .335 batting average, ninth-best in the American League. His .520 slugging percentage was the league's fifth-highest.

Harris was traded to the Washington Senators early in the 1925 season and helped them win the American League pennant, hitting .323 with a 1.003 OPS in 100 games. In the 1925 World Series, Harris went 11-for-25 with three home runs, though the Pirates would come back from a 3–1 deficit to win the series in seven games. After batting .307 in only 92 games in 1926, Harris was selected off waivers by the Pirates before the 1927 season. Harris had another good year, batting .326 with 73 RBIs in 129 games as the Pirates won the National League pennant. In the 1927 World Series, Harris went 3-for-15 with just one RBI as the Pirates lost to the Yankees in a four-game sweep.

Harris died at age 68 in Plum, Pennsylvania following a long illness.

== Career statistics ==
In 970 games played over 10 seasons, Harris hit .317 (963-for-3035) with 461 runs scored, 201 doubles, 64 triples, 47 home runs, 516 RBI, 413 walks, a .404 on-base percentage and a .472 slugging percentage. Defensively, he finished his career with an overall .987 fielding percentage. Harris played for the Bay City (MI) Beavers in the Southern Michigan League in 1913-1914
