= Buster Ross =

American baseball player (1903–1982)

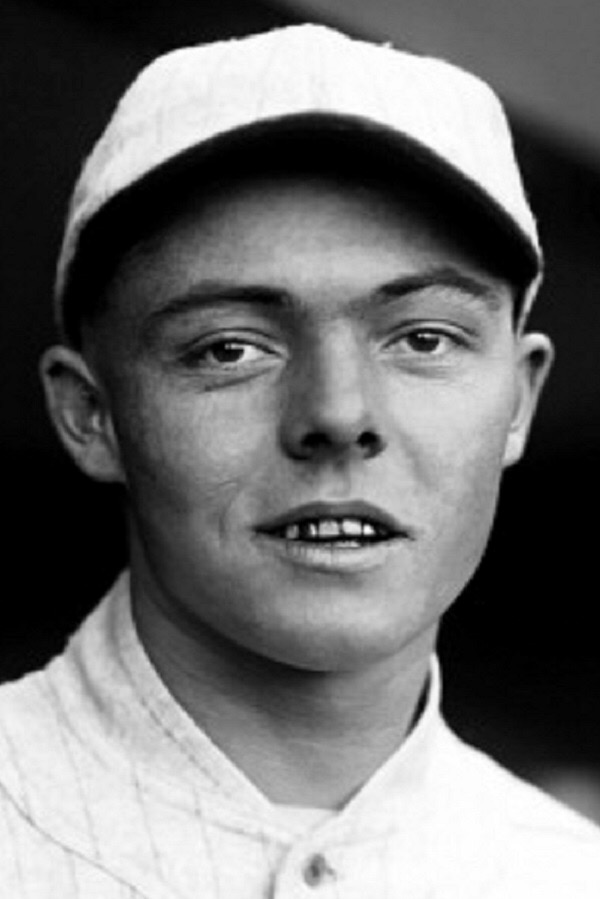
- Pitcher
- Born: March 11, 1903; Kuttawa, Kentucky
- Died: April 24, 1982 (aged 79); Mayfield, Kentucky
- Batted: Left Threw: Left

MLB debut
- June 15, 1924, for the Boston Red Sox

Last MLB appearance
- May 13, 1926, for the Boston Red Sox

MLB statistics
- Win–loss record: 7–12
- Strikeouts: 31
- Earned run average: 5.01
- Stats at Baseball Reference

Teams
- Boston Red Sox (1924–26)

Chester Franklin "Buster" Ross (March 11, 1903 – April 24, 1982) was a major league baseball player for the Boston Red Sox from 1924 to 1926. He was born on March 11, 1903, in Kuttawa, Kentucky. He died on April 24, 1982, in Mayfield, Kentucky.

Ross holds the modern major league record for most errors by a pitcher in one game with four. He committed four errors on May 17, 1925, against the St. Louis Browns.

Ross also gave up Babe Ruth's 300th career home run; this was on September 8, 1925, at Fenway Park.

== Sources ==
- Career statistics from Baseball Reference · Retrosheet · Baseball Almanac
