= 1927 St. Louis Browns season =

Major League Baseball season

1927 St. Louis Browns
- League: American League
- Ballpark: Sportsman's Park
- City: St. Louis, Missouri
- Record: 59–94 (.386)
- League place: 7th
- Owners: Phil Ball
- Managers: Dan Howley
- Radio: KMOX (Garnett Marks)

The 1927 St. Louis Browns season involved the Browns finishing 7th in the American League with a record of 59 wins and 94 losses.

== Offseason ==
Dan Howley; photographed in November 1926, after the announcement that he would be the team's new manager

- November 1926: team owner Phil Ball announces that Dan Howley will be the team's new manager, succeeding George Sisler
- January 15, 1927: Pinky Hargrave, Marty McManus and Bobby LaMotte were traded by the Browns to the Detroit Tigers for Otto Miller, Billy Mullen, Frank O'Rourke and Lefty Stewart.

== Regular season ==
=== Season standings ===
American League
| Team | W | L | Pct. | GB | Home | Road |
|---|---|---|---|---|---|---|
| New York Yankees | 110 | 44 | .714 | — | 57‍–‍19 | 53‍–‍25 |
| Philadelphia Athletics | 91 | 63 | .591 | 19 | 50‍–‍27 | 41‍–‍36 |
| Washington Senators | 85 | 69 | .552 | 25 | 51‍–‍28 | 34‍–‍41 |
| Detroit Tigers | 82 | 71 | .536 | 27½ | 44‍–‍32 | 38‍–‍39 |
| Chicago White Sox | 70 | 83 | .458 | 39½ | 38‍–‍37 | 32‍–‍46 |
| Cleveland Indians | 66 | 87 | .431 | 43½ | 35‍–‍42 | 31‍–‍45 |
| St. Louis Browns | 59 | 94 | .386 | 50½ | 38‍–‍38 | 21‍–‍56 |
| Boston Red Sox | 51 | 103 | .331 | 59 | 29‍–‍49 | 22‍–‍54 |

=== Record vs. opponents ===
1927 American League record Sources:
| Team | BOS | CWS | CLE | DET | NYY | PHA | SLB | WSH |
|---|---|---|---|---|---|---|---|---|
| Boston | — | 11–11 | 15–7 | 5–17 | 4–18 | 6–16 | 6–16 | 4–18 |
| Chicago | 11–11 | — | 8–14 | 13–8 | 5–17 | 8–14 | 15–7 | 10–12 |
| Cleveland | 7–15 | 14–8 | — | 7–15 | 10–12 | 10–12 | 10–11 | 8–14 |
| Detroit | 17–5 | 8–13 | 15–7 | — | 8–14 | 9–13 | 14–8–1 | 11–11–2 |
| New York | 18–4 | 17–5 | 12–10 | 14–8 | — | 14–8–1 | 21–1 | 14–8 |
| Philadelphia | 16–6 | 14–8 | 12–10 | 13–9 | 8–14–1 | — | 16–6 | 12–10 |
| St. Louis | 16–6 | 7–15 | 11–10 | 8–14–1 | 1–21 | 6–16 | — | 10–12–1 |
| Washington | 18–4 | 12–10 | 14–8 | 11–11–2 | 8–14 | 10–12 | 12–10–1 | — |

=== Roster ===
1927 St. Louis Browns
Roster
| Pitchers: Win Ballou; Boom-Boom Beck; George Blaeholder; Stew Bolen; Alvin Crowder; Chet Falk; Milt Gaston; Sam Jones; Ernie Nevers; Lefty Stewart; Elam Vangilder; Ernie Wingard; Jim Wright; Tom Zachary | Catchers: Leo Dixon; Steve O'Neill; Wally Schang; Infielders: Spencer Adams; Wally Gerber; Red Kress; Ski Melillo; Otto Miller; Frank O'Rourke; George Sisler; Guy Sturdy | Outfielders: Herschel Bennett; Bing Miller; Harry Rice; Fred Schulte; Ken Williams | Manager: Dan Howley |

== Player stats ==
=== Batting ===
==== Starters by position ====
Note: Pos = Position; G = Games played; AB = At bats; H = Hits; Avg. = Batting average; HR = Home runs; RBI = Runs batted in

| Pos | Player | G | AB | H | Avg. | HR | RBI |
|---|---|---|---|---|---|---|---|
| C | Wally Schang | 97 | 264 | 84 | .318 | 5 | 42 |
| 1B | George Sisler | 149 | 614 | 201 | .327 | 5 | 97 |
| 2B | Ski Melillo | 107 | 356 | 80 | .225 | 0 | 26 |
| SS | Wally Gerber | 142 | 438 | 98 | .224 | 0 | 45 |
| 3B | Frank O'Rourke | 140 | 538 | 144 | .268 | 1 | 39 |
| OF | Harry Rice | 137 | 520 | 149 | .287 | 7 | 68 |
| OF | Bing Miller | 143 | 492 | 160 | .325 | 5 | 75 |
| OF | Ken Williams | 131 | 423 | 136 | .322 | 17 | 74 |

==== Other batters ====
Note: G = Games played; AB = At bats; H = Hits; Avg. = Batting average; HR = Home runs; RBI = Runs batted in

| Player | G | AB | H | Avg. | HR | RBI |
|---|---|---|---|---|---|---|
| Spencer Adams | 88 | 259 | 69 | .266 | 0 | 29 |
| Herschel Bennett | 93 | 256 | 68 | .266 | 3 | 30 |
| Steve O'Neill | 74 | 191 | 44 | .230 | 1 | 22 |
| Fred Schulte | 60 | 189 | 60 | .317 | 3 | 34 |
| Leo Dixon | 36 | 103 | 20 | .194 | 0 | 12 |
| Otto Miller | 51 | 76 | 17 | .224 | 0 | 8 |
| Red Kress | 7 | 23 | 7 | .304 | 1 | 3 |
| Guy Sturdy | 5 | 21 | 9 | .429 | 0 | 5 |

=== Pitching ===
==== Starting pitchers ====
Note: G = Games pitched; IP = Innings pitched; W = Wins; L = Losses; ERA = Earned run average; SO = Strikeouts

| Player | G | IP | W | L | ERA | SO |
|---|---|---|---|---|---|---|
| Milt Gaston | 37 | 254.0 | 13 | 17 | 5.00 | 77 |
| Sad Sam Jones | 30 | 189.2 | 8 | 14 | 4.32 | 72 |
| Lefty Stewart | 27 | 155.2 | 8 | 11 | 4.28 | 43 |
| Tom Zachary | 13 | 78.1 | 4 | 6 | 4.37 | 13 |
| George Blaeholder | 1 | 9.0 | 0 | 1 | 5.00 | 2 |

==== Other pitchers ====
Note: G = Games pitched; IP = Innings pitched; W = Wins; L = Losses; ERA = Earned run average; SO = Strikeouts

| Player | G | IP | W | L | ERA | SO |
|---|---|---|---|---|---|---|
| Elam Vangilder | 44 | 203.0 | 10 | 12 | 4.79 | 62 |
| Ernie Wingard | 38 | 156.1 | 2 | 13 | 6.56 | 28 |
| Ernie Nevers | 27 | 94.2 | 3 | 8 | 4.94 | 22 |
| Win Ballou | 21 | 90.1 | 5 | 6 | 4.78 | 17 |
| General Crowder | 21 | 73.2 | 3 | 5 | 5.01 | 30 |
| Jim Wright | 2 | 12.0 | 1 | 0 | 4.50 | 4 |
| Boom-Boom Beck | 3 | 11.1 | 1 | 0 | 5.56 | 6 |
| Stew Bolen | 3 | 9.2 | 0 | 1 | 8.38 | 7 |

==== Relief pitchers ====
Note: G = Games pitched; W = Wins; L = Losses; SV = Saves; ERA = Earned run average; SO = Strikeouts

| Player | G | W | L | SV | ERA | SO |
|---|---|---|---|---|---|---|
| Chet Falk | 9 | 1 | 0 | 0 | 5.74 | 2 |
