= 1926 St. Louis Browns season =

Major League Baseball season

1926 St. Louis Browns
- League: American League
- Ballpark: Sportsman's Park
- City: St. Louis, Missouri
- Record: 62–92 (.403)
- League place: 7th
- Owners: Phil Ball
- Managers: George Sisler

The 1926 St. Louis Browns season involved the Browns finishing 7th in the American League with a record of 62 wins and 92 losses.

== Regular season ==
- April 26, 1926, football star Ernie Nevers made his major league baseball debut in a game with the Browns.

=== Season standings ===
American League
Team	W	L	Pct.	GB	Home	Road
New York Yankees	91	63	.591	—	50‍–‍25	41‍–‍38
Cleveland Indians	88	66	.571	3	49‍–‍31	39‍–‍35
Philadelphia Athletics	83	67	.553	6	44‍–‍27	39‍–‍40
Washington Senators	81	69	.540	8	42‍–‍30	39‍–‍39
Chicago White Sox	81	72	.529	9½	47‍–‍31	34‍–‍41
Detroit Tigers	79	75	.513	12	39‍–‍41	40‍–‍34
St. Louis Browns	62	92	.403	29	40‍–‍39	22‍–‍53
Boston Red Sox	46	107	.301	44½	25‍–‍51	21‍–‍56

=== Record vs. opponents ===
1926 American League record Sources:
Team	BOS	CWS	CLE	DET	NYY	PHA	SLB	WSH
Boston	—	6–16	6–16	7–15	5–17	8–14	11–11–1	3–18
Chicago	16–6	—	13–9	14–8–2	8–14	6–15	13–9	11–11
Cleveland	16–6	9–13	—	11–11	11–11	14–8	11–11	16–6
Detroit	15–7	8–14–2	11–11	—	10–12	11–11	12–10	12–10–1
New York	17–5	14–8	11–11	12–10	—	9–13	16–6	12–10–1
Philadelphia	14–8	15–6	8–14	11–11	13–9	—	15–7	7–12
St. Louis	11–11–1	9–13	11–11	10–12	6–16	7–15	—	8–14
Washington	18–3	11–11	6–16	10–12–1	10–12–1	12–7	14–8	—

=== Roster ===
1926 St. Louis Browns
Roster
Pitchers: Win Ballou; Stew Bolen; Dixie Davis; Chet Falk; Milt Gaston; Joe Giard; Claude Jonnard; Ernie Nevers; Charlie Robertson; Elam Vangilder; Ernie Wingard; Tom Zachary	Catchers: Leo Dixon; Pinky Hargrave; Wally Schang; Infielders: Jimmy Austin; Wally Gerber; Bobby LaMotte; Marty McManus; Ski Melillo; Gene Robertson; George Sisler	Outfielders: Herschel Bennett; Cedric Durst; Baby Doll Jacobson; Bing Miller; Harry Rice; Ken Williams	Manager: George Sisler

== Player stats ==
= Indicates team leader

=== Batting ===
==== Starters by position ====
Note: Pos = Position; G = Games played; AB = At bats; H = Hits; Avg. = Batting average; HR = Home runs; RBI = Runs batted in

Pos	Player	G	AB	H	Avg.	HR	RBI
C	Wally Schang	103	285	94	.330	8	50
1B	George Sisler	150	613	178	.290	7	71
2B	Ski Melillo	99	385	98	.255	1	30
3B	Marty McManus	149	549	156	.284	9	68
SS	Wally Gerber	131	411	111	.270	0	42
OF	Ken Williams	108	347	97	.280	17	74
OF	Bing Miller	94	353	117	.331	4	53
OF	Harry Rice	148	578	181	.313	9	59

==== Other batters ====
Note: G = Games played; AB = At bats; H = Hits; Avg. = Batting average; HR = Home runs; RBI = Runs batted in

Player	G	AB	H	Avg.	HR	RBI
Gene Robertson	78	247	62	.251	1	20
Pinky Hargrave	92	235	66	.281	7	40
Herschel Bennett	80	225	60	.267	1	24
Cedric Durst	80	219	52	.237	3	18
Baby Doll Jacobson	50	182	52	.286	2	21
Leo Dixon	33	89	17	.191	0	8
Bobby LaMotte	36	79	16	.203	0	9
Jimmy Austin	1	2	1	.500	0	1

=== Pitching ===
==== Starting pitchers ====
Note: G = Games pitched; IP = Innings pitched; W = Wins; L = Losses; ERA = Earned run average; SO = Strikeouts

Player	G	IP	W	L	ERA	SO
Tom Zachary	34	247.1	14	15	3.60	53
Milt Gaston	32	214.1	10	18	4.33	39
Joe Giard	22	90.0	3	10	7.00	18
Charlie Robertson	8	28.0	1	2	8.36	13

==== Other pitchers ====
Note: G = Games pitched; IP = Innings pitched; W = Wins; L = Losses; ERA = Earned run average; SO = Strikeouts

Player	G	IP	W	L	ERA	SO
Elam Vangilder	42	181.0	9	11	5.17	40
Ernie Wingard	39	169.0	5	8	3.57	30
Win Ballou	43	154.0	11	10	4.79	59
Dixie Davis	27	83.0	3	8	4.66	39
Ernie Nevers	11	74.2	2	4	4.46	16
Chet Falk	18	74.0	4	4	5.35	7
Claude Jonnard	12	36.0	0	2	6.00	13

Ernie Wingard was team leader in saves with 3.

==== Relief pitchers ====
Note: G = Games pitched; W = Wins; L = Losses; SV = Saves; ERA = Earned run average; SO = Strikeouts

Player	G	W	L	SV	ERA	SO
Stew Bolen	5	0	0	0	6.14	7
George Sisler	1	0	0	0	0.00	3
