= 1925 St. Louis Browns season =

Major League Baseball season

1925 St. Louis Browns
- League: American League
- Ballpark: Sportsman's Park
- City: St. Louis, Missouri
- Record: 82–71 (.536)
- League place: 3rd
- Owners: Phil Ball
- Managers: George Sisler

The 1925 St. Louis Browns season involved the Browns finishing 3rd in the American League with a record of 82 wins and 71 losses.

== Regular season ==
On April 14, the Cleveland Indians set the record for most runs scored by a team on Opening Day. The Indians scored 21 runs in a 21–14 win over the St. Louis Browns.

=== Season standings ===
American League
| Team | W | L | Pct. | GB | Home | Road |
|---|---|---|---|---|---|---|
| Washington Senators | 96 | 55 | .636 | — | 53‍–‍22 | 43‍–‍33 |
| Philadelphia Athletics | 88 | 64 | .579 | 8½ | 51‍–‍26 | 37‍–‍38 |
| St. Louis Browns | 82 | 71 | .536 | 15 | 45‍–‍32 | 37‍–‍39 |
| Detroit Tigers | 81 | 73 | .526 | 16½ | 43‍–‍34 | 38‍–‍39 |
| Chicago White Sox | 79 | 75 | .513 | 18½ | 44‍–‍33 | 35‍–‍42 |
| Cleveland Indians | 70 | 84 | .455 | 27½ | 37‍–‍39 | 33‍–‍45 |
| New York Yankees | 69 | 85 | .448 | 28½ | 42‍–‍36 | 27‍–‍49 |
| Boston Red Sox | 47 | 105 | .309 | 49½ | 28‍–‍47 | 19‍–‍58 |

=== Record vs. opponents ===
1925 American League record Sources:
| Team | BOS | CWS | CLE | DET | NYY | PHA | SLB | WSH |
|---|---|---|---|---|---|---|---|---|
| Boston | — | 9–13 | 7–15 | 5–17 | 9–13 | 5–17 | 5–16 | 7–14 |
| Chicago | 13–9 | — | 14–8 | 13–9 | 13–9 | 8–14 | 9–13 | 9–13 |
| Cleveland | 15–7 | 8–14 | — | 11–11–1 | 10–12 | 11–11 | 11–11 | 4–18 |
| Detroit | 17–5 | 9–13 | 11–11–1 | — | 14–8–1 | 8–14 | 12–10 | 10–12 |
| New York | 13–9 | 9–13 | 12–10 | 8–14–1 | — | 9–13 | 11–11–1 | 7–15 |
| Philadelphia | 17–5 | 14–8 | 11–11 | 14–8 | 13–9 | — | 12–10 | 7–13–1 |
| St. Louis | 16–5 | 13–9 | 11–11 | 10–12 | 11–11–1 | 10–12 | — | 11–11 |
| Washington | 14–7 | 13–9 | 18–4 | 12–10 | 15–7 | 13–7–1 | 11–11 | — |

=== Roster ===
1925 St. Louis Browns
Roster
| Pitchers: George Blaeholder; Joe Bush; Dave Danforth; Dixie Davis; Chet Falk; Milt Gaston; Joe Giard; George Grant; George Mogridge; Brad Springer; Ed Stauffer; Elam Vangilder; Ernie Wingard | Catchers: Leo Dixon; Pinky Hargrave; Tony Rego; Hank Severeid; Infielders: Jimmy Austin; Wally Gerber; Bobby LaMotte; Marty McManus; Gene Robertson; George Sisler | Outfielders: Herschel Bennett; Joe Evans; Baby Doll Jacobson; Harry Rice; Jack Tobin; Ken Williams | Manager: George Sisler |

== Player stats ==
=== Batting ===
==== Starters by position ====
Note: Pos = Position; G = Games played; AB = At bats; H = Hits; Avg. = Batting average; HR = Home runs; RBI = Runs batted in

| Pos | Player | G | AB | H | Avg. | HR | RBI |
|---|---|---|---|---|---|---|---|
| C | Leo Dixon | 76 | 205 | 46 | .224 | 1 | 19 |
| 1B | George Sisler | 150 | 649 | 224 | .345 | 12 | 105 |
| 2B | Marty McManus | 154 | 587 | 169 | .288 | 13 | 90 |
| SS | Bobby LaMotte | 97 | 356 | 97 | .272 | 12 | 51 |
| 3B | Gene Robertson | 154 | 582 | 158 | .271 | 14 | 76 |
| OF | Harry Rice | 103 | 354 | 127 | .359 | 11 | 47 |
| OF | Ken Williams | 102 | 411 | 136 | .331 | 25 | 105 |
| OF | Baby Doll Jacobson | 142 | 540 | 184 | .341 | 15 | 76 |

==== Other batters ====
Note: G = Games played; AB = At bats; H = Hits; Avg. = Batting average; HR = Home runs; RBI = Runs batted in

| Player | G | AB | H | Avg. | HR | RBI |
|---|---|---|---|---|---|---|
| Herschel Bennett | 93 | 298 | 83 | .279 | 2 | 37 |
| Wally Gerber | 72 | 246 | 67 | .272 | 0 | 19 |
| Pinky Hargrave | 67 | 225 | 64 | .284 | 8 | 43 |
| Jack Tobin | 77 | 193 | 58 | .301 | 2 | 27 |
| Joe Evans | 55 | 159 | 50 | .314 | 0 | 20 |
| Hank Severeid | 34 | 109 | 40 | .367 | 1 | 21 |
| Tony Rego | 20 | 32 | 13 | .406 | 0 | 3 |
| Jimmy Austin | 1 | 1 | 0 | .000 | 0 | 0 |

=== Pitching ===
==== Starting pitchers ====
Note: G = Games pitched; IP = Innings pitched; W = Wins; L = Losses; ERA = Earned run average; SO = Strikeouts

| Player | G | IP | W | L | ERA | SO |
|---|---|---|---|---|---|---|
| Milt Gaston | 42 | 238.2 | 15 | 14 | 4.41 | 84 |
| Joe Bush | 33 | 208.2 | 14 | 14 | 5.09 | 63 |
| Joe Giard | 30 | 160.2 | 10 | 5 | 5.04 | 43 |
| George Mogridge | 2 | 15.1 | 1 | 1 | 5.87 | 8 |

==== Other pitchers ====
Note: G = Games pitched; IP = Innings pitched; W = Wins; L = Losses; ERA = Earned run average; SO = Strikeouts

| Player | G | IP | W | L | ERA | SO |
|---|---|---|---|---|---|---|
| Elam Vangilder | 52 | 193.1 | 14 | 8 | 4.70 | 61 |
| Dixie Davis | 35 | 180.1 | 12 | 7 | 4.59 | 58 |
| Dave Danforth | 38 | 159.0 | 7 | 9 | 4.36 | 53 |
| Ernie Wingard | 32 | 145.0 | 9 | 10 | 5.52 | 20 |

==== Relief pitchers ====
Note: G = Games pitched; W = Wins; L = Losses; SV = Saves; ERA = Earned run average; SO = Strikeouts

| Player | G | W | L | SV | ERA | SO |
|---|---|---|---|---|---|---|
| Ed Stauffer | 20 | 0 | 1 | 0 | 5.34 | 13 |
| Chet Falk | 13 | 0 | 0 | 0 | 8.28 | 7 |
| George Grant | 12 | 0 | 2 | 0 | 6.06 | 7 |
| Brad Springer | 2 | 0 | 0 | 0 | 3.00 | 0 |
| George Blaeholder | 2 | 0 | 0 | 0 | 31.50 | 0 |
| George Sisler | 1 | 0 | 0 | 0 | 0.00 | 1 |
