= 1927 Detroit Tigers season =

Major League Baseball season

1927 Detroit Tigers
- League: American League
- Ballpark: Navin Field
- City: Detroit, Michigan
- Record: 82–71 (.536)
- League place: 4th
- Owners: Frank Navin
- Managers: George Moriarty
- Radio: WWJ (AM) (Ty Tyson)

The 1927 Detroit Tigers season was a season in American baseball, which involved the Detroit Tigers attempting to win. However, they finished fourth place in the American League.

Outfielder Harry Heilmann won his fourth American League batting title with a .398 batting average.

== Offseason ==
- January 15, 1927: Otto Miller, Billy Mullen, Frank O'Rourke and Lefty Stewart were traded by the Tigers to the St. Louis Browns for Pinky Hargrave, Marty McManus and Bobby LaMotte.
- January 27, 1927: Ty Cobb was released by the Tigers.

== Regular season ==
- May 31, 1927: Johnny Neun of the Tigers executed an unassisted triple play. Neun caught a line drive, tagged the runner off first base and tagged second base before the other runner returned.

=== Season standings ===
American League
Team	W	L	Pct.	GB	Home	Road
New York Yankees	110	44	.714	—	57‍–‍19	53‍–‍25
Philadelphia Athletics	91	63	.591	19	50‍–‍27	41‍–‍36
Washington Senators	85	69	.552	25	51‍–‍28	34‍–‍41
Detroit Tigers	82	71	.536	27½	44‍–‍32	38‍–‍39
Chicago White Sox	70	83	.458	39½	38‍–‍37	32‍–‍46
Cleveland Indians	66	87	.431	43½	35‍–‍42	31‍–‍45
St. Louis Browns	59	94	.386	50½	38‍–‍38	21‍–‍56
Boston Red Sox	51	103	.331	59	29‍–‍49	22‍–‍54

=== Record vs. opponents ===
1927 American League record Sources:
Team	BOS	CWS	CLE	DET	NYY	PHA	SLB	WSH
Boston	—	11–11	15–7	5–17	4–18	6–16	6–16	4–18
Chicago	11–11	—	8–14	13–8	5–17	8–14	15–7	10–12
Cleveland	7–15	14–8	—	7–15	10–12	10–12	10–11	8–14
Detroit	17–5	8–13	15–7	—	8–14	9–13	14–8–1	11–11–2
New York	18–4	17–5	12–10	14–8	—	14–8–1	21–1	14–8
Philadelphia	16–6	14–8	12–10	13–9	8–14–1	—	16–6	12–10
St. Louis	16–6	7–15	11–10	8–14–1	1–21	6–16	—	10–12–1
Washington	18–4	12–10	14–8	11–11–2	8–14	10–12	12–10–1	—

=== Roster ===
1927 Detroit Tigers
Roster
Pitchers: Josh Billings; Ownie Carroll; Rip Collins; Jess Doyle; Sam Gibson; Don Hankins; Ken Holloway; Augie Johns; George Smith; Rufus Smith; Lil Stoner; Jim Walkup; Ed Wells; Earl Whitehill	Catchers: Johnny Bassler; Merv Shea; Larry Woodall; Infielders: Lu Blue; Bernie DeViveiros; Charlie Gehringer; Marty McManus; Johnny Neun; Jackie Tavener; Jack Warner	Outfielders: Bob Fothergill; Harry Heilmann; Heinie Manush; Art Ruble; Al Wingo; Other batters: Clyde Manion	Manager: George Moriarty; Coaches: Lefty Leifield

== Player stats ==
=== Batting ===
==== Starters by position ====
Note: Pos = Position; G = Games played; AB = At bats; H = Hits; Avg. = Batting average; HR = Home runs; RBI = Runs batted in

Pos	Player	G	AB	H	Avg.	HR	RBI
C	Larry Woodall	88	246	69	.280	0	39
1B	Lu Blue	112	365	95	.260	1	42
2B	Charlie Gehringer	133	508	161	.317	4	61
SS	Jackie Tavener	116	419	115	.274	5	59
3B	Jack Warner	139	559	149	.267	1	45
OF	Heinie Manush	151	593	177	.298	6	90
OF	Harry Heilmann	141	505	201	.398	14	120
OF	Bob Fothergill	143	527	189	.359	9	114

==== Other batters ====
Note: G = Games played; AB = At bats; H = Hits; Avg. = Batting average; HR = Home runs; RBI = Runs batted in

Player	G	AB	H	Avg.	HR	RBI
Marty McManus	108	369	99	.268	9	69
Johnny Neun	79	204	66	.324	0	27
Johnny Bassler	81	200	57	.285	0	24
Al Wingo	75	137	32	.234	0	20
Art Ruble	56	91	15	.165	0	11
Merv Shea	34	85	15	.176	0	9
Bernie DeViveiros	24	22	5	.227	0	2
Clyde Manion	1	0	0	----	0	0

=== Pitching ===
==== Starting pitchers ====
Note: G = Games pitched; IP = Innings pitched; W = Wins; L = Losses; ERA = Earned run average; SO = Strikeouts

Player	G	IP	W	L	ERA	SO
Earl Whitehill	41	236.0	16	14	3.36	95
Sam Gibson	33	184.2	11	12	3.80	76
Rip Collins	30	172.2	13	7	4.69	37
Josh Billings	10	67.0	5	4	4.84	18
Rufus Smith	1	8.0	0	0	3.38	2

==== Other pitchers ====
Note: G = Games pitched; IP = Innings pitched; W = Wins; L = Losses; ERA = Earned run average; SO = Strikeouts

Player	G	IP	W	L	ERA	SO
Lil Stoner	38	215.0	10	13	3.98	63
Ken Holloway	36	183.1	11	12	4.07	36
Ownie Carroll	31	172.0	10	6	3.98	41
Ed Wells	8	20.0	0	1	6.75	5

==== Relief pitchers ====
Note: G = Games pitched; W = Wins; L = Losses; SV = Saves; ERA = Earned run average; SO = Strikeouts

Player	G	W	L	SV	ERA	SO
George Smith	29	4	1	0	3.91	32
Don Hankins	20	2	1	2	6.33	10
Jess Doyle	7	0	0	0	8.03	5
Jim Walkup	2	0	0	0	5.40	0
Augie Johns	1	0	0	0	9.00	1

== Farm system ==
Level	Team	League	Manager
A	Fort Worth Panthers	Texas League	Jake Atz
C	Wheeling Stogies	Middle Atlantic League	Bobby Prysock
