= 1926 Detroit Tigers season =

Major League Baseball season

1926 Detroit Tigers
- League: American League
- Ballpark: Navin Field
- City: Detroit, Michigan
- Record: 79–75 (.513)
- League place: 6th
- Owners: Frank Navin
- Managers: Ty Cobb
- Radio: WWJ (AM)

The 1926 Detroit Tigers season was a season in American baseball. The team finished sixth in the American League with a record of 79–75, 12 games behind the New York Yankees.

Heinie Manush won the AL batting title this year, hitting .378, denying Babe Ruth of the Triple Crown. Ruth led the AL in home runs and RBI, but finished second to Manush in batting average at .372.

== Regular season ==
=== Season standings ===
American League
Team	W	L	Pct.	GB	Home	Road
New York Yankees	91	63	.591	—	50‍–‍25	41‍–‍38
Cleveland Indians	88	66	.571	3	49‍–‍31	39‍–‍35
Philadelphia Athletics	83	67	.553	6	44‍–‍27	39‍–‍40
Washington Senators	81	69	.540	8	42‍–‍30	39‍–‍39
Chicago White Sox	81	72	.529	9½	47‍–‍31	34‍–‍41
Detroit Tigers	79	75	.513	12	39‍–‍41	40‍–‍34
St. Louis Browns	62	92	.403	29	40‍–‍39	22‍–‍53
Boston Red Sox	46	107	.301	44½	25‍–‍51	21‍–‍56

=== Record vs. opponents ===
1926 American League record Sources:
Team	BOS	CWS	CLE	DET	NYY	PHA	SLB	WSH
Boston	—	6–16	6–16	7–15	5–17	8–14	11–11–1	3–18
Chicago	16–6	—	13–9	14–8–2	8–14	6–15	13–9	11–11
Cleveland	16–6	9–13	—	11–11	11–11	14–8	11–11	16–6
Detroit	15–7	8–14–2	11–11	—	10–12	11–11	12–10	12–10–1
New York	17–5	14–8	11–11	12–10	—	9–13	16–6	12–10–1
Philadelphia	14–8	15–6	8–14	11–11	13–9	—	15–7	7–12
St. Louis	11–11–1	9–13	11–11	10–12	6–16	7–15	—	8–14
Washington	18–3	11–11	6–16	10–12–1	10–12–1	12–7	14–8	—

=== Roster ===
1926 Detroit Tigers
Roster
Pitchers: Clyde Barfoot; Rip Collins; Wilbur Cooper; Hooks Dauss; Jess Doyle; Sam Gibson; Ken Holloway; Augie Johns; Rudy Kneisch; George Smith; Lil Stoner; Ed Wells; Earl Whitehill	Catchers: Johnny Bassler; Ray Hayworth; Clyde Manion; Larry Woodall; Infielders: Lu Blue; Les Burke; Charlie Gehringer; Billy Mullen; Johnny Neun; Frank O'Rourke; Jackie Tavener; Jack Warner	Outfielders: Ty Cobb; Bob Fothergill; Harry Heilmann; Heinie Manush; Al Wingo	Manager: Ty Cobb; Coaches: George McBride

== Player stats ==
=== Batting ===
==== Starters by position ====
Note: Pos = Position; G = Games played; AB = At bats; H = Hits; Avg. = Batting average; HR = Home runs; RBI = Runs batted in

Pos	Player	G	AB	H	Avg.	HR	RBI
C	Clyde Manion	75	176	35	.199	0	15
1B	Lu Blue	128	429	123	.287	1	52
2B	Charlie Gehringer	123	459	127	.277	1	48
SS	Jackie Tavener	156	532	141	.265	1	58
3B	Jack Warner	100	311	78	.251	0	34
OF	Harry Heilmann	141	502	184	.367	9	101
OF	Bob Fothergill	110	387	142	.367	3	73
OF	Heinie Manush	136	498	188	.378	14	86

==== Other batters ====
Note: G = Games played; AB = At bats; H = Hits; Avg. = Batting average; HR = Home runs; RBI = Runs batted in

Player	G	AB	H	Avg.	HR	RBI
Frank O'Rourke	111	363	88	.242	1	41
Al Wingo	108	298	84	.282	1	45
Johnny Neun	97	242	72	.298	0	15
Ty Cobb	79	233	79	.339	4	62
Johnny Bassler	66	174	53	.305	0	23
Larry Woodall	67	146	34	.233	0	15
Les Burke	38	75	17	.227	0	4
Billy Mullen	11	13	1	.077	0	0
Ray Hayworth	12	11	3	.273	0	5

=== Pitching ===
==== Starting pitchers ====
Note: G = Games pitched; IP = Innings pitched; W = Wins; L = Losses; ERA = Earned run average; SO = Strikeouts

Player	G	IP	W	L	ERA	SO
Earl Whitehill	36	252.1	16	13	3.99	109
Sam Gibson	35	196.1	12	9	3.48	61
Ed Wells	36	178.0	12	10	4.15	58
Lil Stoner	32	159.2	7	10	5.47	57
Rudy Kneisch	2	17.0	0	1	2.65	4

==== Other pitchers ====
Note: G = Games pitched; IP = Innings pitched; W = Wins; L = Losses; ERA = Earned run average; SO = Strikeouts

Player	G	IP	W	L	ERA	SO
Ken Holloway	36	139.0	4	6	5.12	43
Rip Collins	30	122.0	8	8	2.73	44
Augie Johns	35	112.2	6	4	5.35	40
Wilbur Cooper	8	13.2	0	4	11.20	2

==== Relief pitchers ====
Note: G = Games pitched; W = Wins; L = Losses; SV = Saves; ERA = Earned run average; SO = Strikeouts

Player	G	W	L	SV	ERA	SO
Hooks Dauss	35	12	6	9	4.20	27
George Smith	23	1	2	0	6.95	15
Clyde Barfoot	11	1	2	2	4.88	7
Jess Doyle	2	0	0	1	4.15	2

== Farm system ==
Level	Team	League	Manager
AA	Toronto Maple Leafs	International League	Dan Howley
A	Fort Worth Panthers	Texas League	Jake Atz
C	Wheeling Stogies	Middle Atlantic League	Ed Lennox and John Hummel

LEAGUE CHAMPIONS: Toronto
