= List of Detroit Tigers minor league affiliates =

Current Detroit Tigers domestic minor league affiliate locations

The Detroit Tigers farm system consists of seven Minor League Baseball affiliates across the United States and in the Dominican Republic. Four teams are owned by the major league club, while three—the Toledo Mud Hens, Erie SeaWolves, and West Michigan Whitecaps—are independently owned.

The Tigers have been affiliated with the Triple-A Toledo Mud Hens of the International League since 1987, making it the longest-running active affiliation in the organization among teams not owned by the Tigers. It is also the longest independently owned partnership in the team's history including previous stints from 1937 to 1939, 1949 to 1951, and 1967 to 1973. Among all teams, the longest relationship has been with the Lakeland Flying Tigers of the Florida State League, who were affiliates from 1963 to 1964 before reaffiliating in 1967. Their newest affiliate is the Erie SeaWolves of the Eastern League, which became the Tigers' Double-A club in 2001.

Geographically, Detroit's closest domestic affiliate is the Toledo Mud Hens, which are approximately 54 miles (87 km) away. Detroit's furthest domestic affiliates are the Single-A Lakeland Flying Tigers and the Florida Complex League Tigers of the Rookie Florida Complex League, which share a facility some 988 miles (1,590 km) away.

== Current affiliates ==
The Detroit Tigers farm system consists of seven minor league affiliates.

Class	Team	League	Location	Ballpark	Affiliated
Triple-A	Toledo Mud Hens	International League	Toledo, Ohio	Fifth Third Field	1987
Double-A	Erie SeaWolves	Eastern League	Erie, Pennsylvania	UPMC Park	2001
High-A	West Michigan Whitecaps	Midwest League	Comstock Park, Michigan	LMCU Ballpark	1997
Single-A	Lakeland Flying Tigers	Florida State League	Lakeland, Florida	Publix Field at Joker Marchant Stadium	1963
Rookie	FCL Tigers	Florida Complex League	Lakeland, Florida	Publix Field at Joker Marchant Stadium	1995
Rookie	DSL Tigers 1	Dominican Summer League	San Pedro de Macorís, San Pedro de Macorís	Detroit Tigers Academy	1992
Rookie	DSL Tigers 2	Dominican Summer League	San Pedro de Macorís, San Pedro de Macorís	Detroit Tigers Academy	2022

== Past affiliates ==
=== Key ===
Season	Each year is linked to an article about that particular Tigers season.

=== 1919–1962 ===
Minor League Baseball operated with five classes (Double-A, Class A, Class B, Class C, and Class D) from 1932 to 1935. Class A1, between Double-A and Class A, was added in 1936. The minors continued to operate with these six levels through 1945. Triple-A was established as the highest classification in 1946, and Class A1 became Double-A, with Class A through D remaining. These six levels continued through 1962. The Pacific Coast League (PCL) was reclassified from Triple-A to Open in 1952 due to the possibility of becoming a third major league. This arrangement ended following the 1957 season when the relocation of the National League's Dodgers and Giants to the West Coast ended any chance of the PCL being promoted.

Season	Triple-A	Double-A	Class A	Class B	Class C	Class D	Ref.
1919	—	—	—	Fort Worth Panthers	—	—	
1920	—	—	—	Fort Worth Panthers	—	—	
1921	—	—	Fort Worth Panthers	—	—	—	
1922	—	—	Fort Worth Panthers	—	—	—	
1923	—	—	Fort Worth Panthers	—	—	—	
1924	—	—	Fort Worth Panthers	—	—	—	
1925	—	—	Fort Worth Panthers	—	—	—	
1926	—	—	Fort Worth Panthers	—	—	—	
1927	—	—	Fort Worth Panthers	—	—	—	
1928	—	—	Fort Worth Panthers	—	—	—	
1929	—	—	Fort Worth Panthers	—	—	—	
1930	—	—	Beaumont Exporters	—	—	—	
1931	—	—	Beaumont Exporters	—	—	—	
1932	—	Toronto Maple Leafs	Beaumont Exporters	Decatur Commodores	Huntington Boosters	Moline Plowboys	
1933	—	Toronto Maple Leafs	Beaumont Exporters; Hutchinson Wheat Shockers / Bartlesville Broncos	Quincy Shipbuilders / Nashua Millionaires / Brockton Shoemakers	Huntington Boosters; Shreveport Sports	—	
1934	—	—	Beaumont Exporters	—	Charleston Senators; Shreveport Sports / Greenwood Chiefs	Charleroi Tigers	
1935	—	Portland Beavers	Beaumont Exporters	Springfield Senators	Charleston Senators; Henderson Oilers	Charleroi Tigers	
1936	—	Milwaukee Brewers	Beaumont Exporters (A1)	Augusta Tigers	Charleston Senators; Jackson Senators	Alexandria Aces; Charleroi Tigers; Palatka Azaleas; Tiffin Mud Hens	
1937	—	Toledo Mud Hens	Beaumont Exporters (A1); Sioux City Cowboys	Winston-Salem Twins	Charleston Senators; Henderson Oilers	Beckley Bengals; Lake Charles Skippers; Tiffin Mud Hens	
1938	—	Toledo Mud Hens	Beaumont Exporters (A1)	—	Charleston Senators; Hot Springs Bathers	Hobbs Boosters; Tiffin Mud Hens	
1939	—	Toledo Mud Hens	Beaumont Exporters (A1)	—	Henderson Oilers; Hot Springs Bathers	Fulton Tigers; Newport Tigers; Sioux City Cowboys; Tiffin Mud Hens	
1940	—	Buffalo Bisons	Beaumont Exporters (A1)	—	Henderson Oilers; Hot Springs Bathers; Muskegon Reds	Fulton Tigers	
1941	—	Buffalo Bisons; San Francisco Seals	Beaumont Exporters (A1); Elmira Pioneers	Augusta Tigers; Hagerstown Owls; Winston-Salem Twins	Muskegon Reds; Texarkana Twins; Utica Braves	Fulton Tigers; Jamestown Falcons; Tallassee Indians	
1942	—	Buffalo Bisons	Beaumont Exporters (A1); Elmira Pioneers	Augusta Tigers; Hagerstown Owls; Winston-Salem Twins	Pittsfield Electrics	Fulton Tigers; Jamestown Falcons	
1943	—	Buffalo Bisons	—	Hagerstown Owls	—	—	
1944	—	Buffalo Bisons	—	Hagerstown Owls	—	Jamestown Falcons	
1945	—	Buffalo Bisons	—	—	—	Jamestown Falcons	
1946	Buffalo Bisons	Dallas Rebels	Williamsport Grays	—	Lubbock Hubbers; Muskogee Reds; Rome Colonels	Jamestown Falcons	
1947	Buffalo Bisons	Dallas Rebels	Williamsport Tigers	Hagerstown Owls; Montgomery Rebels	Lubbock Hubbers; Rome Colonels	Jamestown Falcons; Nazareth Barons; Thomasville Tigers; Troy Trojans	
1948	Buffalo Bisons; Seattle Rainiers	Little Rock Travelers	Flint Arrows; Williamsport Tigers	Hagerstown Owls	Durham Bulls; Rome Colonels	Clinton Blues; Jamestown Falcons; Thomasville Tigers; Troy Tigers	
1949	Buffalo Bisons; Toledo Mud Hens	Little Rock Travelers	Flint Arrows; Williamsport Tigers	Durham Bulls; Lynn Tigers	Butler Tigers; Rome Colonels	Jamestown Falcons; Thomasville Tigers; Troy Tigers	
1950	Toledo Mud Hens	Little Rock Travelers	Flint Arrows; Williamsport Grays	Durham Bulls	Butler Tigers	Jamestown Falcons; Richmond Tigers; Thomasville Tigers	
1951	Toledo Mud Hens	Little Rock Travelers	Williamsport Tigers	Davenport Tigers; Durham Bulls	—	Jamestown Falcons; Richmond Tigers; Wausau Timberjacks	
1952	Buffalo Bisons	Little Rock Travelers	Williamsport Tigers	Davenport Tigers; Durham Bulls	—	Kinston Eagles; Jamestown Falcons; Wausau Timberjacks	
1953	Buffalo Bisons	Little Rock Travelers	Montgomery Grays	Durham Bulls	Bakersfield Indians; Jackson Senators	Jamestown Falcons; Wausau Timberjacks	
1954	Buffalo Bisons	Little Rock Travelers	Wilkes-Barre Barons	Durham Bulls	Greenville Tigers; Idaho Falls Russets	Jamestown Falcons; Valdosta Tigers	
1955	Buffalo Bisons	Little Rock Travelers	Augusta Tigers	Durham Bulls; Terre Haute Tigers	Idaho Falls Russets; Greenville Bucks	Jamestown Falcons; Panama City Fliers; Valdosta Tigers	
1956	Charleston Senators	—	Augusta Tigers; Syracuse Chiefs	Durham Bulls; Terre Haute Tigers	Idaho Falls Russets	Hazlehurst-Baxley Tigers; Jamestown Falcons; Palatka Tigers; Panama City Fliers; Valdosta Tigers	
1957	Charleston Senators	Birmingham Barons	Augusta Tigers	Durham Bulls	Idaho Falls Russets	Erie Sailors; Montgomery Rebels; Orlando Flyers; Valdosta Tigers	
1958	Charleston Senators	Birmingham Barons	Augusta Tigers; Lancaster Red Roses	Durham Bulls	Idaho Falls Russets	Decatur Commodores; Erie Sailors; Montgomery Rebels; Valdosta Tigers	
1959	Charleston Senators	Birmingham Barons	Knoxville Smokies	Durham Bulls	—	Decatur Commodores; Erie Sailors; Montgomery Rebels	
1960	Denver Bears	Birmingham Barons; Victoria Rosebuds	Knoxville Smokies	Durham Bulls	Duluth–Superior Dukes	Decatur Commodores; Montgomery Rebels	
1961	Denver Bears	Birmingham Barons	Knoxville Smokies	Durham Bulls	Duluth–Superior Dukes	Decatur Commodores; Jamestown Tigers; Montgomery Rebels	
1962	Denver Bears	—	Knoxville Smokies	—	Duluth–Superior Dukes	Jamestown Tigers; Montgomery Rebels; Thomasville Tigers	

=== 1963–1989 ===
Prior to the 1963 season, Major League Baseball (MLB) initiated a reorganization of Minor League Baseball that resulted in a reduction from six classes to four (Triple-A, Double-A, Class A, and Rookie) in response to the general decline of the minors throughout the 1950s and early-1960s when leagues and teams folded due to shrinking attendance caused by baseball fans' preference for staying at home to watch MLB games on television. The only change made within the next 27 years was Class A being subdivided for the first time to form Class A Short Season in 1966.

Season	Triple-A	Double-A	Class A	Class A Short Season	Rookie	Ref(s).
1963	Syracuse Chiefs	Knoxville Smokies	Duluth–Superior Dukes; Jamestown Tigers; Lakeland Tigers; Thomasville Tigers	—	—	
1964	Syracuse Chiefs	Knoxville Smokies	Duluth–Superior Dukes; Jamestown Tigers; Lakeland Tigers	—	Cocoa Tigers	
1965	Syracuse Chiefs	Montgomery Rebels	Daytona Beach Islanders; Duluth–Superior Dukes; Jamestown Tigers; Rocky Mount Leafs	—	—	
1966	Syracuse Chiefs	Montgomery Rebels	Daytona Beach Islanders; Rocky Mount Leafs; Statesville Tigers	—	—	
1967	Toledo Mud Hens	Montgomery Rebels	Lakeland Tigers; Rocky Mount Leafs; Statesville Tigers	Erie Tigers	—	
1968	Toledo Mud Hens	Montgomery Rebels	Lakeland Tigers; Rocky Mount Leafs	Batavia Trojans	GCL Tigers	
1969	Toledo Mud Hens	Montgomery Rebels	Lakeland Tigers; Rocky Mount Leafs	Batavia Trojans	Bristol Tigers	
1970	Toledo Mud Hens	Montgomery Rebels	Lakeland Tigers; Rocky Mount Leafs	Batavia Trojans	Bristol Tigers	
1971	Toledo Mud Hens	Montgomery Rebels	Clinton Pilots; Lakeland Tigers; Rocky Mount Leafs	Batavia Trojans	Bristol Tigers	
1972	Toledo Mud Hens	Montgomery Rebels	Clinton Pilots; Lakeland Tigers; Rocky Mount Leafs	—	Bristol Tigers	
1973	Toledo Mud Hens	Montgomery Rebels	Anderson Tigers; Clinton Pilots; Lakeland Tigers	—	Bristol Tigers	
1974	Evansville Triplets	Montgomery Rebels	Clinton Pilots; Lakeland Tigers	—	Bristol Tigers	
1975	Evansville Triplets	Montgomery Rebels	Clinton Pilots; Lakeland Tigers	—	Bristol Tigers	
1976	Evansville Triplets	Montgomery Rebels	Lakeland Tigers	—	Bristol Tigers	
1977	Evansville Triplets	Montgomery Rebels	Lakeland Tigers	—	Bristol Tigers	
1978	Evansville Triplets	Montgomery Rebels	Lakeland Tigers	—	Bristol Tigers	
1979	Evansville Triplets	Montgomery Rebels	Lakeland Tigers	—	Bristol Tigers	
1980	Evansville Triplets	Montgomery Rebels	Lakeland Tigers	—	Bristol Tigers	
1981	Evansville Triplets	Birmingham Barons	Lakeland Tigers; Macon Peaches	—	Bristol Tigers	
1982	Evansville Triplets	Birmingham Barons	Lakeland Tigers; Macon Peaches	—	Bristol Tigers	
1983	Evansville Triplets	Birmingham Barons	Lakeland Tigers	—	Bristol Tigers	
1984	Evansville Triplets	Birmingham Barons	Lakeland Tigers	—	Bristol Tigers	
1985	Nashville Sounds	Birmingham Barons	Lakeland Tigers	—	Bristol Tigers	
1986	Nashville Sounds	Glens Falls Tigers	Gastonia Tigers; Lakeland Tigers	—	Bristol Tigers	
1987	Toledo Mud Hens	Glens Falls Tigers	Fayetteville Generals; Lakeland Tigers	—	Bristol Tigers	
1988	Toledo Mud Hens	Glens Falls Tigers	Fayetteville Generals; Lakeland Tigers	—	Bristol Tigers	
1989	Toledo Mud Hens	London Tigers	Fayetteville Generals; Lakeland Tigers	Niagara Falls Rapids	Bristol Tigers; DSL Tigers/Giants	

=== 1990–2020 ===
Minor League Baseball operated with six classes from 1990 to 2020. In 1990, the Class A level was subdivided for a second time with the creation of Class A-Advanced. The Rookie level consisted of domestic and foreign circuits.

Season	Triple-A	Double-A	Class A-Advanced	Class A	Class A Short Season	Rookie	Foreign Rookie	Ref(s).
1990	Toledo Mud Hens	London Tigers	Lakeland Tigers	Fayetteville Generals	Niagara Falls Rapids	Bristol Tigers	DSL Tigers/Padres/Red Sox	
1991	Toledo Mud Hens	London Tigers	Lakeland Tigers	Fayetteville Generals	Niagara Falls Rapids	Bristol Tigers	DSL Tigers/Cardinals	
1992	Toledo Mud Hens	London Tigers	Lakeland Tigers	Fayetteville Generals	Niagara Falls Rapids	Bristol Tigers	DSL Tigers/Cardinals	
1993	Toledo Mud Hens	London Tigers	Lakeland Tigers	Fayetteville Generals	Niagara Falls Rapids	Bristol Tigers	DSL Tigers/Cardinals	
1994	Toledo Mud Hens	Trenton Thunder	Lakeland Tigers	Fayetteville Generals	Jamestown Jammers	Bristol Tigers	DSL Tigers	
1995	Toledo Mud Hens	Jacksonville Suns	Lakeland Tigers	Fayetteville Generals	Jamestown Jammers	GCL Tigers	DSL Tigers	
1996	Toledo Mud Hens	Jacksonville Suns	Lakeland Tigers; Visalia Oaks	Fayetteville Generals	Jamestown Jammers	GCL Tigers	DSL Tigers	
1997	Toledo Mud Hens	Jacksonville Suns	Lakeland Tigers	West Michigan Whitecaps	Jamestown Jammers	GCL Tigers	DSL Tigers	
1998	Toledo Mud Hens	Jacksonville Suns	Lakeland Tigers	West Michigan Whitecaps	Jamestown Jammers	GCL Tigers	DSL Tigers	
1999	Toledo Mud Hens	Jacksonville Suns	Lakeland Tigers	West Michigan Whitecaps	Oneonta Tigers	GCL Tigers	DSL Tigers	
2000	Toledo Mud Hens	Jacksonville Suns	Lakeland Tigers	West Michigan Whitecaps	Oneonta Tigers	GCL Tigers	DSL Tigers	
2001	Toledo Mud Hens	Erie SeaWolves	Lakeland Tigers	West Michigan Whitecaps	Oneonta Tigers	GCL Tigers	DSL Tigers	
2002	Toledo Mud Hens	Erie SeaWolves	Lakeland Tigers	West Michigan Whitecaps	Oneonta Tigers	GCL Tigers	DSL Tigers	
2003	Toledo Mud Hens	Erie SeaWolves	Lakeland Tigers	West Michigan Whitecaps	Oneonta Tigers	GCL Tigers	DSL Tigers	
2004	Toledo Mud Hens	Erie SeaWolves	Lakeland Tigers	West Michigan Whitecaps	Oneonta Tigers	GCL Tigers	DSL Tigers	
2005	Toledo Mud Hens	Erie SeaWolves	Lakeland Tigers	West Michigan Whitecaps	Oneonta Tigers	GCL Tigers	DSL Tigers	
2006	Toledo Mud Hens	Erie SeaWolves	Lakeland Tigers	West Michigan Whitecaps	Oneonta Tigers	GCL Tigers	DSL Tigers; VSL Tigers/Marlins	
2007	Toledo Mud Hens	Erie SeaWolves	Lakeland Flying Tigers	West Michigan Whitecaps	Oneonta Tigers	GCL Tigers	DSL Tigers; VSL Tigers	
2008	Toledo Mud Hens	Erie SeaWolves	Lakeland Flying Tigers	West Michigan Whitecaps	Oneonta Tigers	GCL Tigers	DSL Tigers; VSL Tigers	
2009	Toledo Mud Hens	Erie SeaWolves	Lakeland Flying Tigers	West Michigan Whitecaps	Oneonta Tigers	GCL Tigers	DSL Tigers; VSL Tigers	
2010	Toledo Mud Hens	Erie SeaWolves	Lakeland Flying Tigers	West Michigan Whitecaps	Connecticut Tigers	GCL Tigers	DSL Tigers; VSL Tigers	
2011	Toledo Mud Hens	Erie SeaWolves	Lakeland Flying Tigers	West Michigan Whitecaps	Connecticut Tigers	GCL Tigers	DSL Tigers; VSL Tigers	
2012	Toledo Mud Hens	Erie SeaWolves	Lakeland Flying Tigers	West Michigan Whitecaps	Connecticut Tigers	GCL Tigers	DSL Tigers; VSL Tigers	
2013	Toledo Mud Hens	Erie SeaWolves	Lakeland Flying Tigers	West Michigan Whitecaps	Connecticut Tigers	GCL Tigers	DSL Tigers; VSL Tigers	
2014	Toledo Mud Hens	Erie SeaWolves	Lakeland Flying Tigers	West Michigan Whitecaps	Connecticut Tigers	GCL Tigers	DSL Tigers; VSL Tigers	
2015	Toledo Mud Hens	Erie SeaWolves	Lakeland Flying Tigers	West Michigan Whitecaps	Connecticut Tigers	GCL Tigers	DSL Tigers; VSL Tigers	
2016	Toledo Mud Hens	Erie SeaWolves	Lakeland Flying Tigers	West Michigan Whitecaps	Connecticut Tigers	GCL Tigers East; GCL Tigers West	DSL Tigers	
2017	Toledo Mud Hens	Erie SeaWolves	Lakeland Flying Tigers	West Michigan Whitecaps	Connecticut Tigers	GCL Tigers East; GCL Tigers West	DSL Tigers	
2018	Toledo Mud Hens	Erie SeaWolves	Lakeland Flying Tigers	West Michigan Whitecaps	Connecticut Tigers	GCL Tigers East; GCL Tigers West	DSL Tigers 1 DSL Tigers 2	
2019	Toledo Mud Hens	Erie SeaWolves	Lakeland Flying Tigers	West Michigan Whitecaps	Connecticut Tigers	GCL Tigers East; GCL Tigers West	DSL Tigers 1 DSL Tigers 2	
2020 (Note: The 2020 Minor League Baseball season was cancelled due to the COVID-19 pandemic.)	Toledo Mud Hens	Erie SeaWolves	Lakeland Flying Tigers	West Michigan Whitecaps	Norwich Sea Unicorns	GCL Tigers East; GCL Tigers West	DSL Tigers 1 DSL Tigers 2	

=== 2021–present ===
The current structure of Minor League Baseball is the result of an overall contraction of the system beginning with the 2021 season. Class A was reduced to two levels: High-A and Low-A. Low-A was reclassified as Single-A in 2022.

Season	Triple-A	Double-A	High-A	Single-A	Rookie	Foreign Rookie	Ref.
2021	Toledo Mud Hens	Erie SeaWolves	West Michigan Whitecaps	Lakeland Flying Tigers	FCL Tigers East; FCL Tigers West	DSL Tigers	
2022	Toledo Mud Hens	Erie SeaWolves	West Michigan Whitecaps	Lakeland Flying Tigers	FCL Tigers	DSL Tigers 1 DSL Tigers 2	
2023	Toledo Mud Hens	Erie SeaWolves	West Michigan Whitecaps	Lakeland Flying Tigers	FCL Tigers	DSL Tigers 1 DSL Tigers 2	
2024	Toledo Mud Hens	Erie SeaWolves	West Michigan Whitecaps	Lakeland Flying Tigers	FCL Tigers	DSL Tigers 1 DSL Tigers 2	
2025	Toledo Mud Hens	Erie SeaWolves	West Michigan Whitecaps	Lakeland Flying Tigers	FCL Tigers	DSL Tigers 1 DSL Tigers 2	
2026	Toledo Mud Hens	Erie SeaWolves	West Michigan Whitecaps	Lakeland Flying Tigers	FCL Tigers	DSL Tigers 1 DSL Tigers 2	
