= 1926 New York Yankees season =

Season for the Major League Baseball team the New York Yankees

1926 New York Yankees
- American League champions
- League: American League
- Ballpark: Yankee Stadium
- City: New York City, New York
- Record: 91–63 (.591)
- League place: 1st
- Owners: Jacob Ruppert
- General managers: Ed Barrow
- Managers: Miller Huggins

The 1926 New York Yankees season was the team's 24th season. The team finished with a record of 91–63, winning their fourth pennant, finishing three games ahead of the Cleveland Indians. New York was managed by Miller Huggins. The Yankees played at Yankee Stadium. In the World Series, they lost in 7 games to the St. Louis Cardinals, with the series ending with Babe Ruth being caught stealing second in the bottom of the 9th inning in Game 7.

== Regular season ==
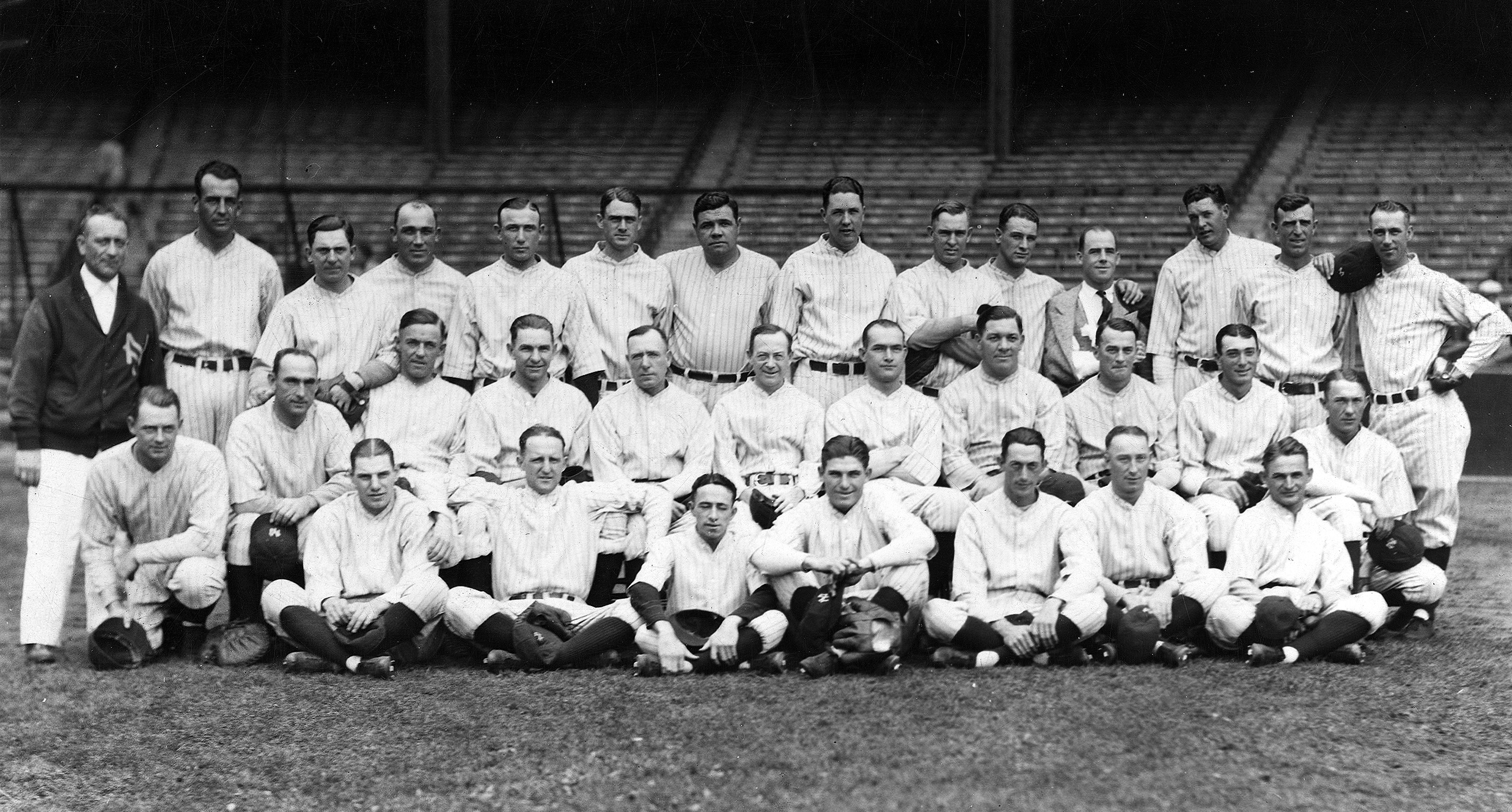
The 1926 New York Yankees

=== Season standings ===
American League
Team	W	L	Pct.	GB	Home	Road
New York Yankees	91	63	.591	—	50‍–‍25	41‍–‍38
Cleveland Indians	88	66	.571	3	49‍–‍31	39‍–‍35
Philadelphia Athletics	83	67	.553	6	44‍–‍27	39‍–‍40
Washington Senators	81	69	.540	8	42‍–‍30	39‍–‍39
Chicago White Sox	81	72	.529	9½	47‍–‍31	34‍–‍41
Detroit Tigers	79	75	.513	12	39‍–‍41	40‍–‍34
St. Louis Browns	62	92	.403	29	40‍–‍39	22‍–‍53
Boston Red Sox	46	107	.301	44½	25‍–‍51	21‍–‍56

=== Record vs. opponents ===
1926 American League record Sources:
Team	BOS	CWS	CLE	DET	NYY	PHA	SLB	WSH
Boston	—	6–16	6–16	7–15	5–17	8–14	11–11–1	3–18
Chicago	16–6	—	13–9	14–8–2	8–14	6–15	13–9	11–11
Cleveland	16–6	9–13	—	11–11	11–11	14–8	11–11	16–6
Detroit	15–7	8–14–2	11–11	—	10–12	11–11	12–10	12–10–1
New York	17–5	14–8	11–11	12–10	—	9–13	16–6	12–10–1
Philadelphia	14–8	15–6	8–14	11–11	13–9	—	15–7	7–12
St. Louis	11–11–1	9–13	11–11	10–12	6–16	7–15	—	8–14
Washington	18–3	11–11	6–16	10–12–1	10–12–1	12–7	14–8	—

=== Roster ===
1926 New York Yankees
Roster
Pitchers: Walter Beall; Garland Braxton; Waite Hoyt; Hank Johnson; Sam Jones; Herb McQuaid; Herb Pennock; Dutch Ruether; Bob Shawkey; Urban Shocker; Myles Thomas	Catchers: Honey Barnes; Benny Bengough; Pat Collins; Hank Severeid; Bill Skiff; Infielders: Spencer Adams; Joe Dugan; Mike Gazella; Lou Gehrig; Mark Koenig; Tony Lazzeri; Fred Merkle; Aaron Ward	Outfielders: Roy Carlyle; Earle Combs; Kiddo Davis; Bob Meusel; Ben Paschal; Babe Ruth; Other batters: Nick Cullop	Manager: Miller Huggins; Coaches: Fred Merkle; Charley O'Leary

== Player stats ==
=== Batting ===
==== Starters by position ====
Note: Pos = Position; G = Games played; AB = At bats; H = Hits; Avg. = Batting average; HR = Home runs; RBI = Runs batted in

Pos	Player	G	AB	H	Avg.	HR	RBI
C	Pat Collins	102	290	83	.286	7	35
1B	Lou Gehrig	155	572	179	.313	16	112
2B	Tony Lazzeri	155	589	162	.275	18	114
3B	Joe Dugan	123	484	125	.288	1	64
SS	Mark Koenig	147	617	167	.271	5	62
OF	Babe Ruth	152	495	184	.372	47	150
OF	Earle Combs	145	606	181	.299	8	55
OF	Bob Meusel	108	415	130	.315	12	81

==== Other batters ====
Note: G = Games played; AB = At bats; H = Hits; Avg. = Batting average; HR = Home runs; RBI = Runs batted in

Player	G	AB	H	Avg.	HR	RBI
Ben Paschal	96	258	74	.287	7	32
Mike Gazella	66	168	39	.232	0	20
Hank Severeid	41	127	34	.268	0	13
Benny Bengough	36	84	32	.388	0	14
Roy Carlyle	35	52	20	.381	0	11
Aaron Ward	22	31	10	.323	0	3
Spencer Adams	28	25	3	.120	0	1
Bill Skiff	6	11	1	.091	0	0
Nick Cullop	2	2	1	.500	0	0
Fred Merkle	1	2	0	.000	0	0
Honey Barnes	1	0	0	----	0	0
Kiddo Davis	1	0	0	----	0	0

=== Pitching ===
==== Starting pitchers ====
Note: G = Games pitched; IP = Innings pitched; W = Wins; L = Losses; ERA = Earned run average; SO = Strikeouts

Player	G	IP	W	L	ERA	SO
Herb Pennock	40	266.1	23	11	3.62	78
Urban Shocker	41	258.2	19	11	3.38	59
Waite Hoyt	40	217.2	16	12	3.85	79
Dutch Ruether	5	36.0	2	3	3.50	8

==== Other pitchers ====
Note: G = Games pitched; IP = Innings pitched; W = Wins; L = Losses; ERA = Earned run average; SO = Strikeouts

Player	G	IP	W	L	ERA	SO
Sam Jones	39	161.0	9	8	4.98	69
Myles Thomas	33	140.1	6	6	4.23	38
Bob Shawkey	29	104.1	8	7	3.62	63
Walter Beall	20	81.2	2	4	3.53	56

==== Relief pitchers ====
Note: G = Games pitched; W = Wins; L = Losses; SV = Saves; ERA = Earned run average; SO = Strikeouts

Player	G	W	L	SV	ERA	SO
Garland Braxton	37	5	1	2	2.67	30
Herb McQuaid	17	1	0	0	6.10	6
Hank Johnson	1	0	0	1	18.00	0

== 1926 World Series ==
Game	Date	Visitor	Score	Home	Score	Record (NYY-STL)	Attendance
1	October 2	St. Louis Cardinals	1	New York Yankees	2	1–0	61,658
2	October 3	St. Louis Cardinals	6	New York Yankees	2	1–1	63,600
3	October 5	New York Yankees	0	St. Louis Cardinals	4	1–2	37,708
4	October 6	New York Yankees	10	St. Louis Cardinals	5	2–2	38,825
5	October 7	New York Yankees	3	St. Louis Cardinals	2	3–2	39,552
6	October 9	St. Louis Cardinals	10	New York Yankees	2	3–3	48,615
7	October 10	St. Louis Cardinals	3	New York Yankees	2	3–4	38,093
St. Louis Cardinals win 4–3
