= 1929 Hollywood Stars season =

1929 Hollywood Stars
- League: Pacific Coast League
- Ballpark: Wrigley Field
- City: Hollywood
- Record: 113–89
- League place: 3rd
- Owner: Bill "Hardpan" Lane
- Managers: Ossie Vitt

The 1929 Hollywood Stars season, was the fourth season for the original Hollywood Stars baseball team. The team, which began in 1903 as the Sacramento Solons, moved to Hollywood in 1926 and played in the Pacific Coast League (PCL).

The 1929 PCL season ran from March 26 to October 7, 1929. The Stars, led by manager Ossie Vitt, finished third in the Pacific Coast League (PCL) with a 113–89 record. However, the PCL provided for a championship series to be played between the teams with best records in the first and second halves of the season. The Stars qualified for the championship series by compiling a 61–42 record in the second half of the season.

In the championship series, the Stars advanced to the championship series and defeated the Mission Reds, four games to three. On October 13, the Stars won the decisive Game 7 at Wrigley Field by an 8–3 score.

Pitcher Frank Shellenback led the Stars and the PCL with 26 wins. He pitched 335 innings and compiled a 26–12 record with a 3.98 earned run average (ERA) and 163 strikeouts. Augie Johns also pitched well, compiling a 17–10 record with a 3.90 ERA.

The team had five players who hit over .300 with at least 500 at bats. Right fielder Bill Rumler led the way with a .386 batting average, 26 home runs, and 120 RBIs. The team's other top hitters were left fielder Liz Funk (.384 average, 13 home runs, 125 RBIs), first baseman Mickey Heath (.349 average, 38 home runs, 156 RBIs), center fielder Cleo Carlyle (.347 average, 20 home runs, 136 RBIs), and third baseman Red Rollings (.324 average, six home runs, 86 RBIs).

== 1929 PCL standings ==
Team	W	L	Pct.	GB
Mission Reds	128	78	.612	--
San Francisco Seals	114	87	.567	11.5
Hollywood Stars	113	89	.559	13.0
Oakland Oaks	111	91	.550	15.0
Los Angeles Angels	104	98	.515	17.0
Portland Beavers	90	112	.446	36.0
Sacramento Solons	85	117	.421	41.0
Seattle Indians	67	135	.332	59.0

== Statistics ==
=== Batting ===
Note: Pos = Position; G = Games played; AB = At bats; H = Hits; Avg. = Batting average; HR = Home runs; SLG = Slugging percentage; RBI = Runs batted in; SB = Stolen bases

Pos	Player	G	AB	H	Avg.	HR	SLG	RBI	SB
RF	Bill Rumler	140	503	194	.386	26	.630	120	6
LF	Liz Funk	150	547	210	.384	13	.552	125	16
1B	Mickey Heath	201	680	237	.349	38	.596	156	20
CF	Cleo Carlyle	195	666	231	.347	20	.536	136	21
3B	Red Rollings	198	738	239	.324	6	.416	86	14
P	Frank Shellenback	70	152	49	.322	12	.605	37	0
RF, LF	Wally Rehg	80	200	61	.305	2	.420	38	8
C	Clarence Sypher	51	95	29	.305	0	.358	11	0
LF, RF	Bill Albert	89	203	58	.286	2	.389	30	4
RF, LF	Harry Green	71	190	53	.279	9	.474	45	3
SS	Dud Lee	205	848	222	.262	4	.329	71	9
C	Johnny Bassler	107	299	75	.251	0	.308	37	1
2B	Mike Maloney	96	292	69	.236	1	.284	34	0

=== Pitching ===
Note: G = Games pitched; IP = Innings pitched; W = Wins; L = Losses; PCT = Win percentage; ERA = Earned run average; SO = Strikeouts

Player	G	IP	W	L	PCT	ERA	SO
Frank Shellenback	46	335.0	26	12	.684	3.98	163
Buzz Wetzel	45	269.0	18	15	.545	4.05	113
Augie Johns	44	201.0	17	10	.630	3.89	88
Hank Hulvey	49	240.0	14	11	.560	6.08	81
George Hollerson	45	247.0	13	13	.500	4.41	67
Walt Kinney	41	203.0	12	12	.500	4.26	81
Joe Marticorena	45	145.0	9	9	.500	5.77	87
Dick McCabe	19	62.0	1	4	.200	5.81	20
