= 1924 World Series =

1924 Major League Baseball championship series

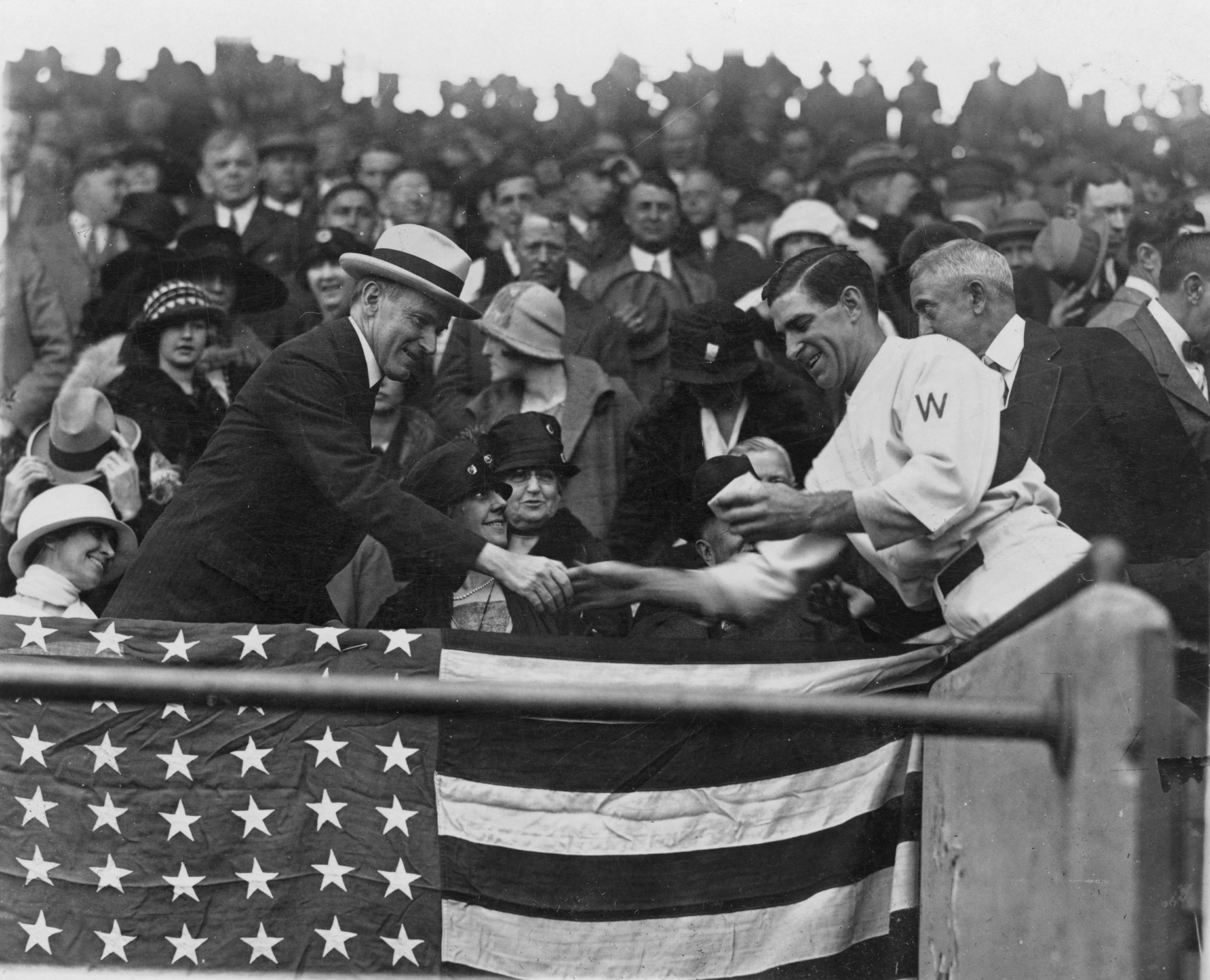
- Washington manager Bucky Harris presents U.S. President Calvin Coolidge with the baseball used to open the 1924 World Series.
Team (Wins)	Managers	Season
Washington Senators (4)	Bucky Harris (player/manager)	92–62, .597, GA: 2
New York Giants (3)	John McGraw	93–60, .608, GA: 1 1/2
- Dates: October 4–10
- Venue(s): Griffith Stadium (Washington); Polo Grounds (New York)
- Umpires: Tommy Connolly (AL), Bill Klem (NL); Bill Dinneen (AL), Ernie Quigley (NL)
- Hall of Famers: Umpires: Tommy Connolly; Bill Klem; Senators: Goose Goslin; Bucky Harris (2B/manager); Walter Johnson; Sam Rice; Giants: John McGraw (manager); Frankie Frisch; Travis Jackson; George Kelly; Freddie Lindstrom; Billy Southworth‡ Bill Terry; Hack Wilson; Ross Youngs ‡ Elected as a manager

Broadcast
- Radio: Westinghouse
- Radio announcers: Graham McNamee

The 1924 World Series was the championship series of the 1924 Major League Baseball season. The 21st edition of the World Series was a best-of-seven playoff matching the American League (AL) champion Washington Senators against the National League (NL) champion New York Giants, with the Senators defeating the Giants in seven games to win their first championship in club history. This was the first major professional sports championship ever won by a Washington, D.C.-based team.

The Giants became the first team to play in four consecutive World Series, winning in 1921–1922 and losing in 1923–1924, and their veteran manager, John McGraw, made his ninth and final World Series appearance. The deciding game of the Series was decided in extra innings, the second such occurrence in MLB history (the first had occurred in 1912).

Walter Johnson, nearing the end of his playing career at age 36, made his first ever World Series appearance, having completed his first 20-win season since 1919 (with 23 wins). He lost both of his two starts, but was awarded a win in Game 7 with a relief appearance in which he held the Giants scoreless over the final four innings, helping the Senators secure their first championship. Game 7 is widely considered one of the most dramatic in World Series history.

Johnson struck out 12 Giants batters in Game 1 in a losing cause. Although that total matched Ed Walsh's number in the 1906 World Series, it came in 12 innings. Johnson struck out only nine in the first nine innings.

In Game 7, with the Senators behind 3–1 in the eighth, Bucky Harris hit a routine ground ball to third which hit a pebble and took a bad hop over Giants third baseman Freddie Lindstrom. Two runners scored on the play, tying the score at three. Walter Johnson then came in to pitch the ninth, and held the Giants scoreless into extra innings. With the score still 3–3, Washington came up in the 12th. With one out, and runners on first and second, Earl McNeely hit another grounder at Lindstrom, and again the ball took a bad hop, scoring Muddy Ruel with the Series-winning run.

This was the first World Series to use the 2–3–2 home game pattern, which would be adapted as the permanent format beginning the following year.

This was the Senators' only World Series championship victory during the franchise's time in Washington. In 1961, the Senators relocated to Minnesota and were rebranded as the Twins, and subsequently won the World Series in 1987 and in 1991. This would be the last World Series win for a Washington based team until the Washington Nationals, who were originally the Montreal Expos, won the World Series in 2019, 95 years after the Senators' only triumph.

In 2020, ESPN named it the third greatest World Series of all-time.

== Summary ==
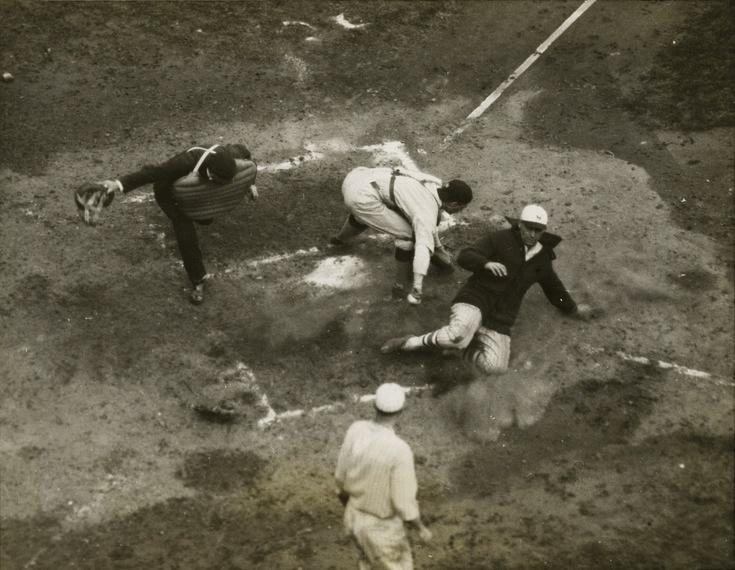
Likely Giants pitcher Art Nehf sliding in safely at home during game one of the 1924 World Series.

AL Washington Senators (4) vs. NL New York Giants (3)

Game	Date	Score	Location	Time	Attendance
1	October 4	New York Giants – 4, Washington Senators – 3 (12)	Griffith Stadium	3:07	35,760
2	October 5	New York Giants – 3, Washington Senators – 4	Griffith Stadium	1:58	35,922
3	October 6	Washington Senators – 4, New York Giants – 6	Polo Grounds	2:25	47,608
4	October 7	Washington Senators – 7, New York Giants – 4	Polo Grounds	2:10	49,243
5	October 8	Washington Senators – 2, New York Giants – 6	Polo Grounds	2:30	49,271
6	October 9	New York Giants – 1, Washington Senators – 2	Griffith Stadium	1:57	34,254
7	October 10	New York Giants – 3, Washington Senators – 4 (12)	Griffith Stadium	3:00	31,667

== Matchups ==
=== Game 1 ===
October 4, 1924 2:00 pm (ET) at Griffith Stadium in Washington, D.C.
Team	1	2	3	4	5	6	7	8	9	10	11	12	R	H	E
New York	0	1	0	1	0	0	0	0	0	0	0	2	4	14	1
Washington	0	0	0	0	0	1	0	0	1	0	0	1	3	10	1
WP: Art Nehf (1–0) LP: Walter Johnson (0–1); Home runs: NYG: High Pockets Kelly (1), Bill Terry (1); WSH: None

The Senators tied it at 2–2 with a run in the bottom of the ninth. The Giants scored two in the top of the 12th off the Big Train; Washington fought back for a run in the bottom of the inning, but left the tying run on third.

=== Game 2 ===
October 5, 1924 2:00 pm (ET) at Griffith Stadium in Washington, D.C.
Team	1	2	3	4	5	6	7	8	9	R	H	E
New York	0	0	0	0	0	0	1	0	2	3	6	0
Washington	2	0	0	0	1	0	0	0	1	4	6	1
WP: Tom Zachary (1–0) LP: Jack Bentley (0–1) Sv: Firpo Marberry (1); Home runs: NYG: None; WSH: Goose Goslin (1), Bucky Harris (1)

Washington fought back early in the game, scoring 3 runs in 5 innings. But the Giants would quickly fight back in the final three frames to tie the game as it went to the bottom of the ninth. With Joe Judge representing the potential winning run and 1 out, Roger Peckinpaugh hit a double to win the game and tie the series.

=== Game 3 ===
October 6, 1924 2:00 pm (ET) at Polo Grounds in Manhattan, New York
Team	1	2	3	4	5	6	7	8	9	R	H	E
Washington	0	0	0	2	0	0	0	1	1	4	9	2
New York	0	2	1	1	0	1	0	1	X	6	12	0
WP: Hugh McQuillan (1–0) LP: Firpo Marberry (0–1) Sv: Mule Watson (1); Home runs: WSH: None; NYG: Rosy Ryan (1)

Washington threatened in the ninth. Ossie Bluege, the only man reliever Claude Jonnard faced, drew a bases-loaded walk to make it 6-4. Mule Watson then came in to nail down the last two outs. Rosy Ryan's fourth-inning home run is to date the only World Series home run by a relief pitcher and the only postseason home run by a relief pitcher until Travis Wood in 2016.

=== Game 4 ===
October 7, 1924 2:00 pm (ET) at Polo Grounds in Manhattan, New York
Team	1	2	3	4	5	6	7	8	9	R	H	E
Washington	0	0	3	0	2	0	0	2	0	7	13	3
New York	1	0	0	0	0	1	0	1	1	4	6	1
WP: George Mogridge (1–0) LP: Virgil Barnes (0–1) Sv: Firpo Marberry (2); Home runs: WSH: Goose Goslin (2); NYG: None

Goose Goslin had a big game for the Senators, with three singles and a home run to go 4-for-4 and drive in four runs.

=== Game 5 ===
October 8, 1924 2:00 pm (ET) at Polo Grounds in Manhattan, New York
Team	1	2	3	4	5	6	7	8	9	R	H	E
Washington	0	0	0	1	0	0	0	1	0	2	9	1
New York	0	0	1	0	2	0	0	3	X	6	13	0
WP: Jack Bentley (1–1) LP: Walter Johnson (0–2) Sv: Hugh McQuillan (1); Home runs: WSH: Goose Goslin (3); NYG: Jack Bentley (1)

Johnson again pitched a complete game but the Giants recorded 13 hits off him, taking a 3–2 lead in the Series. Bentley broke a 1–1 tie in the fifth with a two-run home run, the second homer by a New York pitcher in the Series after Rosy Ryan's in Game 3.

=== Game 6 ===
October 9, 1924 2:00 pm (ET) at Griffith Stadium in Washington, D.C.
Team	1	2	3	4	5	6	7	8	9	R	H	E
New York	1	0	0	0	0	0	0	0	0	1	7	1
Washington	0	0	0	0	2	0	0	0	X	2	4	0
WP: Tom Zachary (2–0) LP: Art Nehf (1–1)

Both Washington runs scored on a single in the fifth inning by manager Bucky Harris. Tom Zachary won his second game of the series, deadlocking the series at three games each.

=== Game 7 ===
October 10, 1924 2:00 pm (ET) at Griffith Stadium in Washington, D.C.
Team	1	2	3	4	5	6	7	8	9	10	11	12	R	H	E
New York	0	0	0	0	0	3	0	0	0	0	0	0	3	8	3
Washington	0	0	0	1	0	0	0	2	0	0	0	1	4	10	4
WP: Walter Johnson (1–2) LP: Jack Bentley (1–2); Home runs: NYG: None; WSH: Bucky Harris (2)

The unheralded Curly Ogden was given the Game 7 start for Washington – it was his only World Series appearance. He struck out a batter and walked one, and then was pulled for George Mogridge. It was later revealed that manager Bucky Harris started righthander Ogden so that the Giants would be locked into their "righthanded" lineup, before he switched to the lefthander Mogridge.

With the Senators trailing 3–1 in the eighth inning with bases loaded and two outs, Bucky Harris hit a "bad hop" ground ball to third, that reportedly struck a pebble, which Freddie Lindstrom failed to catch (no error was charged). As a result, two runs scored for a 3–3 tie. In the ninth inning, Walter Johnson would step up as pitcher and pitch four scoreless innings.

In the bottom of the 12th inning, Giants catcher Hank Gowdy stepped on his own discarded mask while trying to catch a Muddy Ruel foul pop-up, and dropped the ball for an error. Given a second chance in the at-bat, Ruel doubled. Johnson reached first on another error, and with Ruel on second and Johnson on first, Earl McNeely hit a "bad hop" ground ball to Lindstrom that was almost identical to Harris' eighth inning hit. Lindstrom again failed to catch the ball (reportedly hitting the same pebble that was struck four innings earlier) as it bounced over him into left field, and Ruel scored the series-winning run.

The game holds the record as the longest Game 7 (by innings) in MLB postseason history. It was also the first World Series Game 7 to be decided in extra innings (although the 1912 series ended with a ten-inning Game 8), and the last until 1991.

Newsreel footage of Game 7

In 2014, on the Series' 90th anniversary, the Library of Congress acquired a newsreel of highlight footage from Game 7, including McNeely's Series-winning base hit. CNN subsequently released this footage on its website.

The next time a Washington team won the World Series would come 95 years later in 2019, when the Washington Nationals did so against the Houston Astros.

== Composite line score ==
1924 World Series (4–3): Washington Senators (A.L.) over New York Giants (N.L.)

Team	1	2	3	4	5	6	7	8	9	10	11	12	R	H	E
Washington Senators	2	0	3	4	5	1	0	6	3	0	0	2	26	61	12
New York Giants	2	3	2	2	2	5	1	5	3	0	0	2	27	66	6
Total attendance: 283,725 Average attendance: 40,532; Winning player's share: $5,960 Losing player's share: $3,820

== See also ==
- 1924 Colored World Series
