= Slider (pitch) =

Baseball pitch

A common grip used to throw a slider

In baseball, a slider is a type of breaking ball, a pitch that moves or "breaks" as it approaches the batter. Due to the grip and wrist motion, the slider typically exhibits more lateral movement when compared to other breaking balls, such as the curveball.

The slider is generally among the fastest breaking balls, commonly ranging 80 to 90 mph (130 to 140 km/h). A variation of the slider, known as the sweeper, is characterized as being slightly slower, but having more lateral movement. Pitches that exhibit qualities similar to that of both a slider and a curveball are referred to as a slurve.

== Grip and action ==
The grip for a slider is characterized as being similar to that of a fastball. Like all pitches, the grip can take many different forms, with slight variations between pitchers suiting their individual preferences. A common feature in most slider grips is the index and middle finger being close to each other.

The associated wrist motion often contributes a large amount to the pitch's movement, and is characterized by a more supine positioning upon release. Like many other breaking balls, such as the sweeper (a type of slider) this motion can cause significant strain on the arm, and thus is not recommended for players under the age of 13.

== Effects ==
The slider will typically move laterally towards the pitcher's glove-side. For example, when thrown by a right-handed pitcher, from the pitcher's perspective, the pitch will "slide" from the right (the arm-side) to the left (the glove-side). When thrown by a left-handed pitcher, the pitch breaks in the opposite direction, moving from the left to the right. Some sliders have more vertical break, while others have more horizontal break. The difference relies on arm slot, supination, and ultimately pitcher preference.

== Slider pitchers ==
Many famous pitchers have used sliders. Hall of Fame pitcher Randy Johnson was well-known for his unusually fast slider, which he nicknamed "Mr. Snappy". Other Hall of Fame pitchers renowned for their excellent slider include Steve Carlton, Dennis Eckersley, Bob Gibson, and John Smoltz.

Other pitchers to use sliders have included:

- Matt Brash
- Dylan Cease
- Gerrit Cole
- Jacob deGrom
- Zack Greinke
- Clayton Kershaw
- Brad Lidge
- Sparky Lyle
- Shohei Ohtani
- Chris Sale
- CC Sabathia
- Max Scherzer
- Dave Stieb
- Spencer Strider
- Justin Verlander

== History ==
The innovator of the slider is debated, but some credit Charles Albert "Chief" Bender as the first to use the pitch. Other players claimed to be the inventor include George Blaeholder and George Uhle.
