= Rufus Smith (baseball) =

American baseball player (1905–1984)

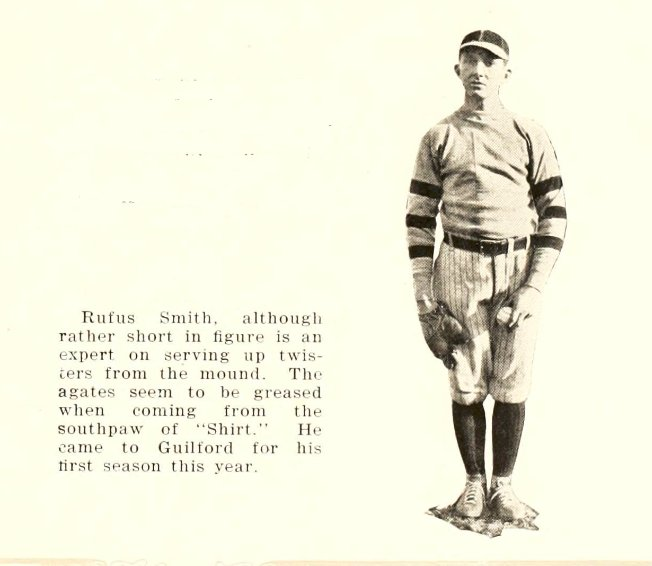
- Pitcher
- Born: January 24, 1905
- Died: August 21, 1984 (aged 79); Aiken, South Carolina
- Batted: Right Threw: Left

MLB debut
- October 2, 1927, for the Detroit Tigers

Last MLB appearance
- October 2, 1927, for the Detroit Tigers

MLB statistics
- Games pitched: 1
- Earned run average: 3.38
- Strikeouts: 2
- Stats at Baseball Reference

Teams
- Detroit Tigers (1927)

Rufus Frazier "Shirt" Smith (January 24, 1905 – August 21, 1984) was a Major League Baseball pitcher. He played in one game for the Detroit Tigers on October 2, 1927.

Smith played college baseball at Guilford College where he formed a battery with catcher Rick Ferrell. While pitching at Guilford, he caught the attention of a New England millionaire who signed Smith to one of his semi-pro teams in Massachusetts. At the end of the summer, he enrolled at Brown University. While pitching for a team in East Douglas, Massachusetts in 1927, he caught the attention of a Tigers scout, signed a contract and received a signing bonus of $5,000 (equivalent to $90,500 in 2024).
