= Dan Howley =

American baseball player and manager (1885–1944)

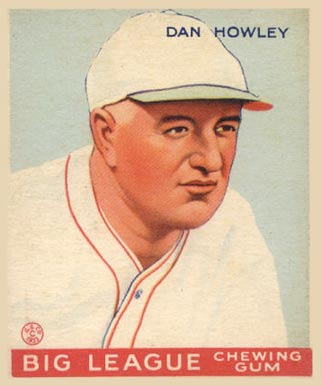
- Catcher / Manager
- Born: October 16, 1885; Weymouth, Massachusetts, U.S.
- Died: March 10, 1944 (aged 58); Weymouth, Massachusetts, U.S.
- Batted: Right Threw: Right

MLB debut
- May 15, 1913, for the Philadelphia Phillies

Last MLB appearance
- August 23, 1913, for the Philadelphia Phillies

MLB statistics
- Batting average: .125
- Home runs: 0
- Runs batted in: 2
- Managerial record: 397–524
- Winning %: .431
- Stats at Baseball Reference

Teams
- As player: Philadelphia Phillies (1913); As manager: St. Louis Browns (1927–1929); Cincinnati Reds (1930–1932)

Photograph of Howley in 1926

Daniel Philip "Dapper Dan" Howley (October 16, 1885 – March 10, 1944) was an American Major League Baseball manager with the St. Louis Browns and the Cincinnati Reds. His first year as manager of the Browns saw his team lose 94 games and finish 50 1/2 games behind the legendary 1927 New York Yankees. He stayed two more years in St. Louis, with his best year coming in 1928, finishing in third place. In 1929, he was hired by the Reds, but he averaged 95 losses in three years, leading to his dismissal. He finished his career with a lifetime 397–524 record (.431 winning percentage).

He was a four-time manager of the Toronto Maple Leafs of the International League, leading the team in 1918, 1923–1926, 1933, and 1937, winning the league pennant in 1918 and 1926. Howley was inducted into the International League Hall of Fame.

Prior to his managing career, Howley was a major league catcher for part of the 1913 season for the Philadelphia Phillies. He later served as a coach for the Detroit Tigers for three seasons, 1919 and 1921–22. Howley also acted as the first base umpire in a July 1922 game.

Howley died of a heart attack in his birthplace of Weymouth, Massachusetts at age 58.

== Managerial record ==
| Team | Year | Regular season | | | | | Postseason | | | |
| Team | Year | Games | Won | Lost | Win % | Finish | Won | Lost | Win % | Result |
|---|---|---|---|---|---|---|---|---|---|---|
| SLB | 1927 | 153 | 59 | 94 | .386 | 7th in AL | – | – | – | – |
| SLB | 1928 | 154 | 82 | 72 | .532 | 3rd in AL | – | – | – | – |
| SLB | 1929 | 154 | 79 | 73 | .520 | 4th in AL | – | – | – | – |
| SLB total | | 459 | 220 | 239 | .479 | | 0 | 0 | – | |
| CIN | 1930 | 154 | 59 | 95 | .383 | 7th in NL | – | – | – | – |
| CIN | 1931 | 154 | 58 | 96 | .377 | 8th in NL | – | – | – | – |
| CIN | 1932 | 154 | 60 | 94 | .390 | 8th in NL | – | – | – | – |
| CIN total | | 462 | 177 | 285 | .383 | | 0 | 0 | – | |
| Total | | 921 | 397 | 524 | .431 | | 0 | 0 | – | |
