= George Mogridge =

American baseball player (1889–1962)

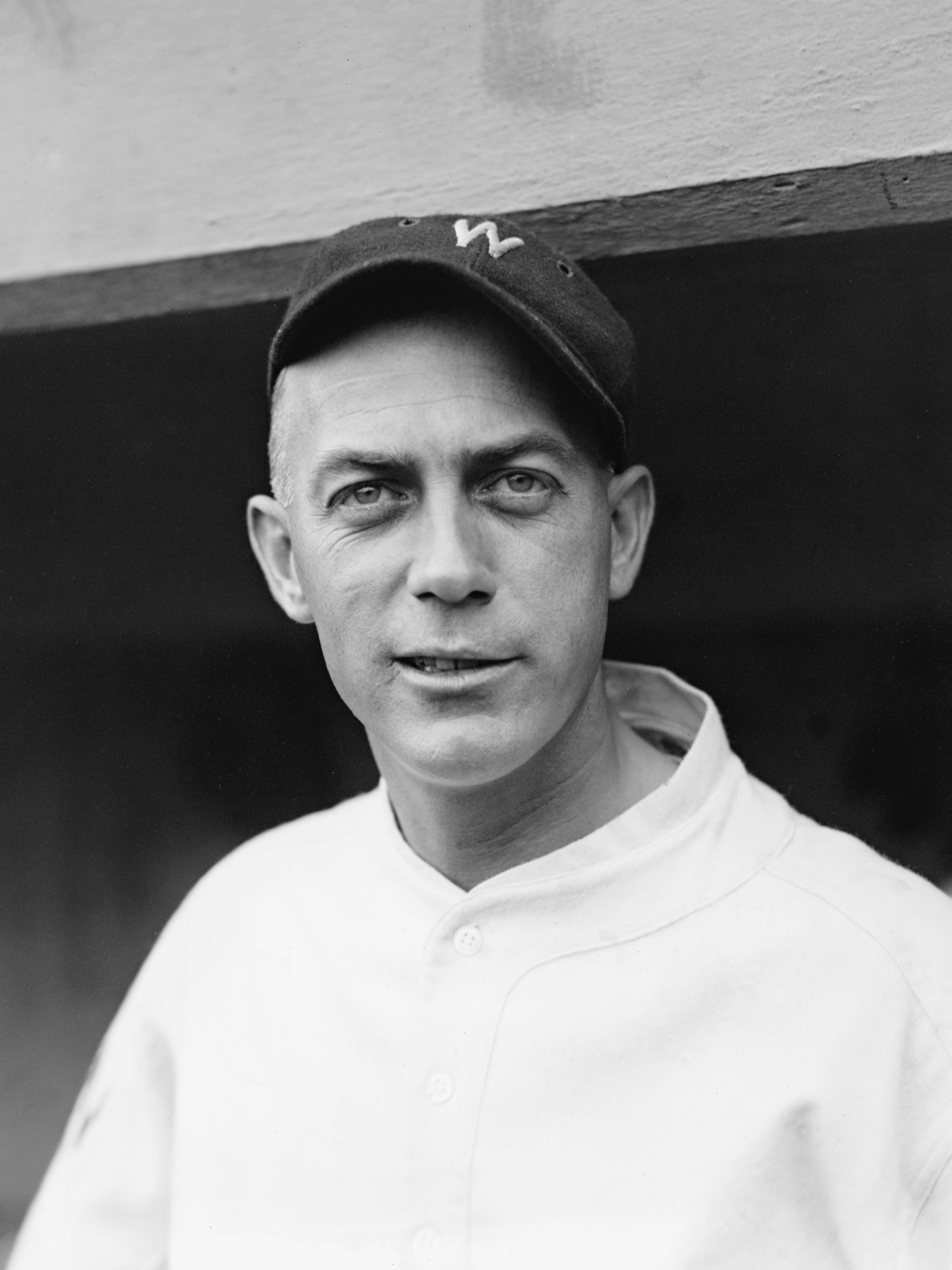
- Mogridge in 1924
- Pitcher
- Born: February 18, 1889; Rochester, New York, U.S.
- Died: March 4, 1962 (aged 73); Rochester, New York, U.S.
- Batted: Left Threw: Left

MLB debut
- August 17, 1912, for the Chicago White Sox

Last MLB appearance
- July 2, 1927, for the Boston Braves

MLB statistics
- Win–loss record: 132–133
- Earned run average: 3.23
- Strikeouts: 678
- Stats at Baseball Reference

Teams
- Chicago White Sox (1911–1912); New York Yankees (1915–1920); Washington Senators (1921–1925); St. Louis Browns (1925); Boston Braves (1926–1927)

Career highlights and awards
- World Series champion (1924); Pitched a no-hitter on April 24, 1917

George Anthony Mogridge (February 18, 1889 – March 4, 1962) was an American professional baseball pitcher. He played in Major League Baseball for the Chicago White Sox (1911–12), New York Yankees (1915–20), Washington Senators (1921–25), St. Louis Browns (1925), and Boston Braves (1926–27). Mogridge threw the first no-hitter for the Yankees franchise in 1917 and was a member of the 1924 World Series champions with the Senators.

== Early life ==
George Anthony Mogridge was born in Rochester, New York. He attended Holy Family School and the University of Rochester, where he played college baseball for the Rochester Yellowjackets. He also played semi-professional baseball in Rochester.

== Professional career ==
Mogridge made his professional baseball debut in 1911 with the Galesburg Pavers of the Class D Central Association. A friend who signed with Galesburg suggested Mogridge to the team. The Chicago White Sox purchased Mogridge from the Pavers in June, and gave him a brief trial in the major leagues in September 1911. He had a 0–2 win–loss record in four games pitched for Chicago. He opened the 1912 season with the White Sox, but he struggled, pitching to a 3–4 record in 17 games. The White Sox sent Mogridge to the Lincoln Railsplitters of the Class A Western League in July. He participated in spring training with the White Sox in 1913, and was released to the Minneapolis Millers of the Class AA American Association. Larry Schlafly, the manager of the Buffalo Buffeds of the outlaw Federal League pursued Mogridge before the 1914 season, but he returned to Minneapolis for the start of the season. Minneapolis traded Mogridge to the Des Moines Boosters of the Western League in May 1914.

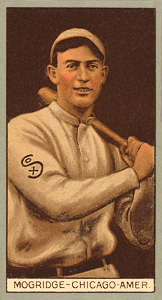
George Mogridge, Chicago White Sox, 1912

In 1915, Mogridge emerged as the ace of the Boosters' pitching staff. Des Moines sold Mogridge to the New York Yankees for $3,500 ($108,788 in current dollar terms) in June after he was scouted by Duke Farrell; per the arrangement, Mogridge did not join the Yankees until after the conclusion of Des Moines' season in September. He had a 2–3 record and a 1.76 earned run average (ERA) in six games for the Yankees in 1915. The next year, he had a 6–12 record and a 2.31 ERA with 10 complete games. On April 24, 1917, at Fenway Park, he threw the first no-hitter in Yankees history. He had a 9–11 record, a 2.98 ERA, and 15 complete games in 1917. In 1918, Mogridge had a 16–13 record and a 2.18 ERA, and led the American League in games pitched (45), saves (7) and games finished (23). He had a 16–13 record in 1919, but slipped to a 5–9 record in 1920.

On December 31, 1920, the Yankees traded Mogridge and Duffy Lewis to the Washington Senators for Braggo Roth. His 3.00 ERA for the 1921 season was the second-best in the league, behind only Red Faber. Mogridge helped the Senators win the 1924 World Series. With the Senators trailing in the series two games to one, Mogridge started Game 4 for the Senators, which they won. He also pitched in relief for the Senators in the deciding Game 7, replacing Curly Ogden, who Bucky Harris, Washington's manager, decided to start but allow to only pitch to two batters. Mogridge pitched 4 2/3 innings, allowing one earned run, to give Washington the chance to stay in the game, which Washington won in extra innings.

Mogridge struggled at the beginning of the 1925 season, pitching to a 3–4 record with only three complete games. On June 18, the Senators traded Mogridge and Pinky Hargrave to the St. Louis Browns for Hank Severeid. He pitched in two games for the Browns in 1925. On February 6, 1926, the Browns traded Mogridge with cash to the New York Yankees for Wally Schang. The Yankees intended to send Mogridge to a minor league team as payment for players acquired during the 1925 season. Mogridge refused to accept a minor league assignment, which was his right as a 10-year veteran of the major leagues. The Boston Braves selected Mogridge off of waivers from the Yankees on February 15. He had a 6–10 record and a 4.50 ERA with two complete games in 1926. In 1927, he had a 6–4 record and a 3.70 ERA.

The Braves sold Mogridge to the Rochester Tribe of the Class AA International League in June 1927 so that he could become their manager, following the resignation of George Stallings. Mogridge signed a three-year contract with Rochester for $30,000 ($543,046 in current dollar terms). The St. Louis Cardinals acquired the Tribe after the 1927 season, incorporating it into their expanding farm system, and bought Mogridge out of the remaining two years on his contract so they could hire Billy Southworth to manage the team.

== Personal life ==
After his release from the Tribe, Mogridge stayed in Rochester, where he resumed playing semi-professional baseball. Mogridge owned a hotel, the Mogridge Inn, from 1927 to 1934, when it was destroyed by a fire. He then operated a sporting goods store until 1942. He took a job with the Weathermaster Company, selling storm windows, and worked for them until 1960. In his later years, Mogridge enjoyed fishing. He purchased a cottage on the Bay of Quinte in Ontario, Canada.

Mogridge and his wife, Clara, had a son, George J. Mogridge. He was a member of the Society of the Holy Name.

Mogridge died in his home in Rochester on March 4, 1962. He was buried in the Holy Sepulchre Cemetery in Rochester.

== See also ==
- List of Major League Baseball annual saves leaders
- List of Major League Baseball no-hitters

Achievements
| Preceded by Eddie Cicotte | MLB no-hitters April 24, 1917 | Succeeded by Fred Toney |
