= Honey Barnes =

American baseball player (1900-1981)

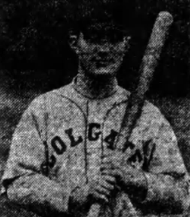
- Barnes with the Colgate University baseball team
- Catcher
- Born: January 31, 1900; Fulton, New York, U.S.
- Died: June 18, 1981 (aged 81); Lockport, New York, U.S.
- Batted: Left Threw: Right

MLB debut
- April 20, 1926, for the New York Yankees

Last MLB appearance
- April 20, 1926, for the New York Yankees

MLB statistics
- Games played: 1
- At bats: 0
- Walks: 1
- Stats at Baseball Reference

Teams
- New York Yankees (1926)

John Francis "Honey" Barnes (January 31, 1900 – June 18, 1981) was an American Major League Baseball catcher. Barnes played for the New York Yankees in the 1926 season. A native of Fulton, New York in Oswego County, Barnes appeared in one game for the franchise, April 20, 1926, getting a walk in a single at bat. Barnes played college baseball for Colgate University. In 1922, he was the only freshman to make the team. After baseball, Barnes began working at Bell Aircraft, a radiator company and would eventually work the Niagara County Department of Social Services. Barnes died in Lockport, New York on June 18, 1981 after a brief illness. His wife, Helen, died in 1965. He would be buried at St. Mary's Cemetery in Fulton.
