= Rudy Kneisch =

American baseball player (1899–1965)

Rudolph Frank Kneisch
- Pitcher
- Born: April 10, 1899; Baltimore, Maryland, U.S.
- Died: April 6, 1965 (aged 65); Baltimore, Maryland, U.S.
- Batted: Right Threw: Right

MLB debut
- September 21, 1926, for the Detroit Tigers

Last MLB appearance
- September 26, 1926, for the Detroit Tigers

MLB statistics
- Win–loss record: 0–1
- Earned run average: 2.65
- Strikeouts: 4
- Stats at Baseball Reference

Teams
- Detroit Tigers (1926)

Rudolph Frank Kneisch (April 10, 1899 – April 6, 1965) was an American professional baseball player who played in two games for the Detroit Tigers during the 1926 season. He was born in Baltimore, Maryland, and died there at the age of 65.
