= Brad Springer =

American baseball player (1904-1970)

- Pitcher
- Born: May 9, 1904; Detroit, Michigan
- Died: January 4, 1970 (aged 65); Birmingham, Michigan
- Batted: Right Threw: Right

MLB debut
- May 1, 1925, for the St. Louis Browns

Last MLB appearance
- April 23, 1926, for the Cincinnati Reds

MLB statistics
- Win–loss record: 0–0
- Earned run average: 4.15
- Strikeouts: 1
- Stats at Baseball Reference

Teams
- St. Louis Browns (1925); Cincinnati Reds (1926)

Bradford Louis Springer (May 9, 1904 – January 4, 1970) was a Major League Baseball pitcher. Springer played for the St. Louis Browns in 1925 and the Cincinnati Reds in 1926.
