= Don Hankins =

American baseball player (1902–1963)

- Pitcher
- Born: February 9, 1902; Pendleton, Indiana
- Died: May 16, 1963 (aged 61); Winston-Salem, North Carolina
- Batted: Right Threw: Right

MLB debut
- April 23, 1927, for the Detroit Tigers

Last MLB appearance
- September 3, 1927, for the Detroit Tigers

MLB statistics
- Win–loss record: 2-1
- Earned run average: 6.33
- Strikeouts: 10
- Stats at Baseball Reference

Teams
- Detroit Tigers (1927)

Donald Wayne Hankins (February 9, 1902 – May 16, 1963) was a Major League Baseball pitcher who played for the Detroit Tigers in 1927.
