= Jim Wright (1920s pitcher) =

English baseball player (1900-1963)

- Pitcher
- Born: September 19, 1900; Hyde, Greater Manchester, England
- Died: April 11, 1963 (aged 62); Oakland, California
- Batted: Right Threw: Right

MLB debut
- September 14, 1927, for the St. Louis Browns

Last MLB appearance
- May 4, 1928, for the St. Louis Browns

MLB statistics
- Win–loss record: 1–0
- Earned run average: 5.79
- Strikeouts: 6
- Stats at Baseball Reference

Teams
- St. Louis Browns (1927–1928)

James Wright (September 19, 1900 – April 11, 1963) was an English born professional baseball pitcher. He played two seasons in Major League Baseball for the St. Louis Browns from 1927 to 1928, appearing in four career games.
