= Stew Bolen =

American baseball player

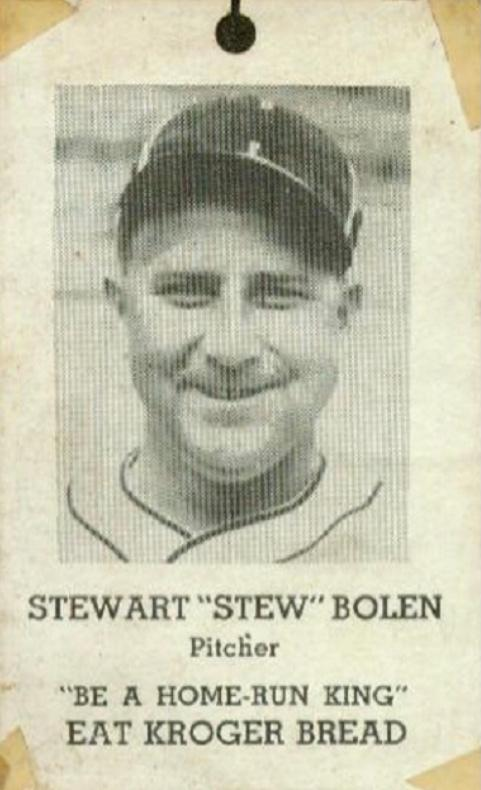
- Pitcher
- Born: October 12, 1902; Jackson, Alabama, U.S.
- Died: August 30, 1969 (aged 66); Mobile, Alabama, U.S.
- Batted: Left Threw: Left

MLB debut
- April 15, 1926, for the St. Louis Browns

Last MLB appearance
- May 16, 1932, for the Philadelphia Phillies

MLB statistics
- Win–loss record: 3–13
- Earned run average: 6.09
- Strikeouts: 72
- Stats at Baseball Reference

Teams
- St. Louis Browns (1926–1927); Philadelphia Phillies (1931–1932)

Stewart O'Neal Bolen (October 12, 1902 – August 30, 1969) was an American professional baseball pitcher who played four seasons in Major League Baseball, in 1926 and 1927 with the St. Louis Browns and the Philadelphia Phillies in 1931 and 1932.
