= Hank Severeid =

American baseball player (1891–1968)

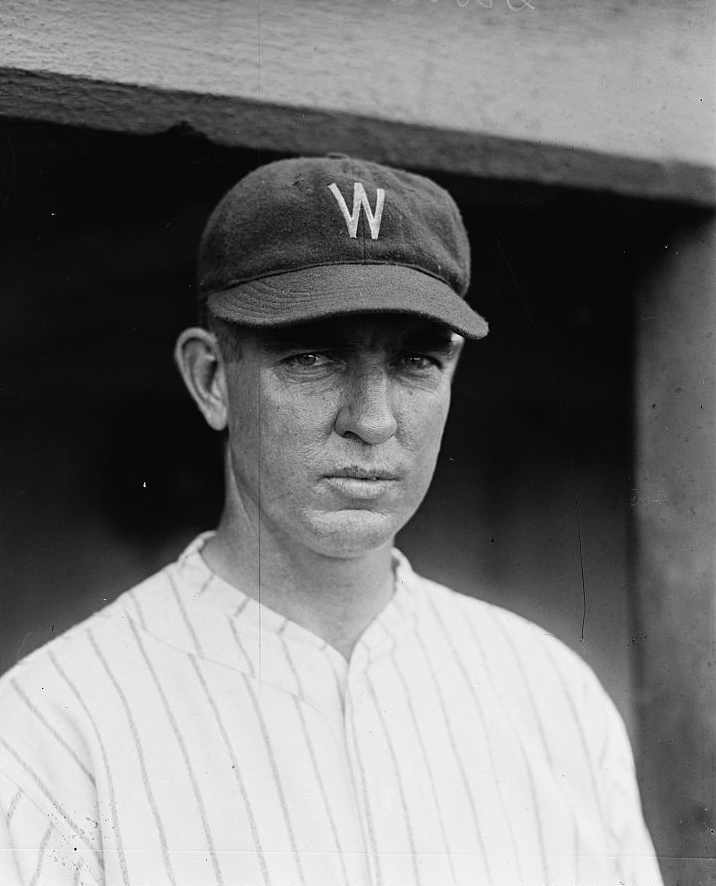
- Severeid in 1925
- Catcher
- Born: June 1, 1891; Story City, Iowa, U.S.
- Died: December 17, 1968 (aged 77); San Antonio, Texas, U.S.
- Batted: Right Threw: Right

MLB debut
- May 15, 1911, for the Cincinnati Reds

Last MLB appearance
- September 25, 1926, for the New York Yankees

MLB statistics
- Batting average: .289
- Home runs: 17
- Runs batted in: 539
- Stats at Baseball Reference

Teams
- Cincinnati Reds (1911–1913); St. Louis Browns (1915–1925); Washington Senators (1925–1926); New York Yankees (1926)

Henry Levai Severeid (June 1, 1891 – December 17, 1968) was an American professional baseball player and scout. He played as a catcher in Major League Baseball from 1911 to 1926, most notably as a member of the St. Louis Browns where, he was known for being one of the best defensive catchers of his era and a capable handler of pitching staffs. He also played for the Cincinnati Reds, Washington Senators and the New York Yankees.

== Biography ==
Severeid was born in Story City, Iowa to Norwegian immigrants Lars Severeid and Maria (Naess) Severeid. Three of his brothers, Oscar, Charles, and Elmer, played minor league ball.

Severeid finished 6th in voting for the 1924 American League MVP for playing in 137 Games and having 432 At Bats, 37 Runs, 133 Hits, 23 Doubles, 2 Triples, 4 Home Runs, 48 RBI, 1 Stolen Base, 36 Walks, .308 Batting Average, .362 On-base percentage, .398 Slugging Percentage, 172 Total Bases and 31 Sacrifice Hits.

On June 18, 1925, the Browns traded Severeid to the Washington Senators for George Mogridge and Pinky Hargrave.

He helped the Senators win the 1925 American League pennant and the Yankees win the 1926 American League pennant.

In 15 seasons he played in 1,390 Games and had 4,312 At Bats, 408 Runs, 1,245 Hits, 204 Doubles, 42 Triples, 17 Home Runs, 539 RBI, 35 Stolen Bases, 331 Walks, .289 Batting Average, .342 On-base percentage, .367 Slugging Percentage, 1,584 Total Bases and 125 Sacrifice Hits. He is also the Baltimore Orioles Career Leader in At Bats per Strikeout (27.8).

Severeid spent over a quarter century as a scout, for the Chicago Cubs (1943) and Boston Red Sox from 1944. In 1941, he co-authored the book Play Ball! Advice for Young Ballplayers with Charles Edward Chapman (1880–1941). Severeid died in his sleep in San Antonio, Texas on December 17, 1968 while serving as a scout for the Red Sox.
