= Tom Zachary =

American baseball player(1896–1969)

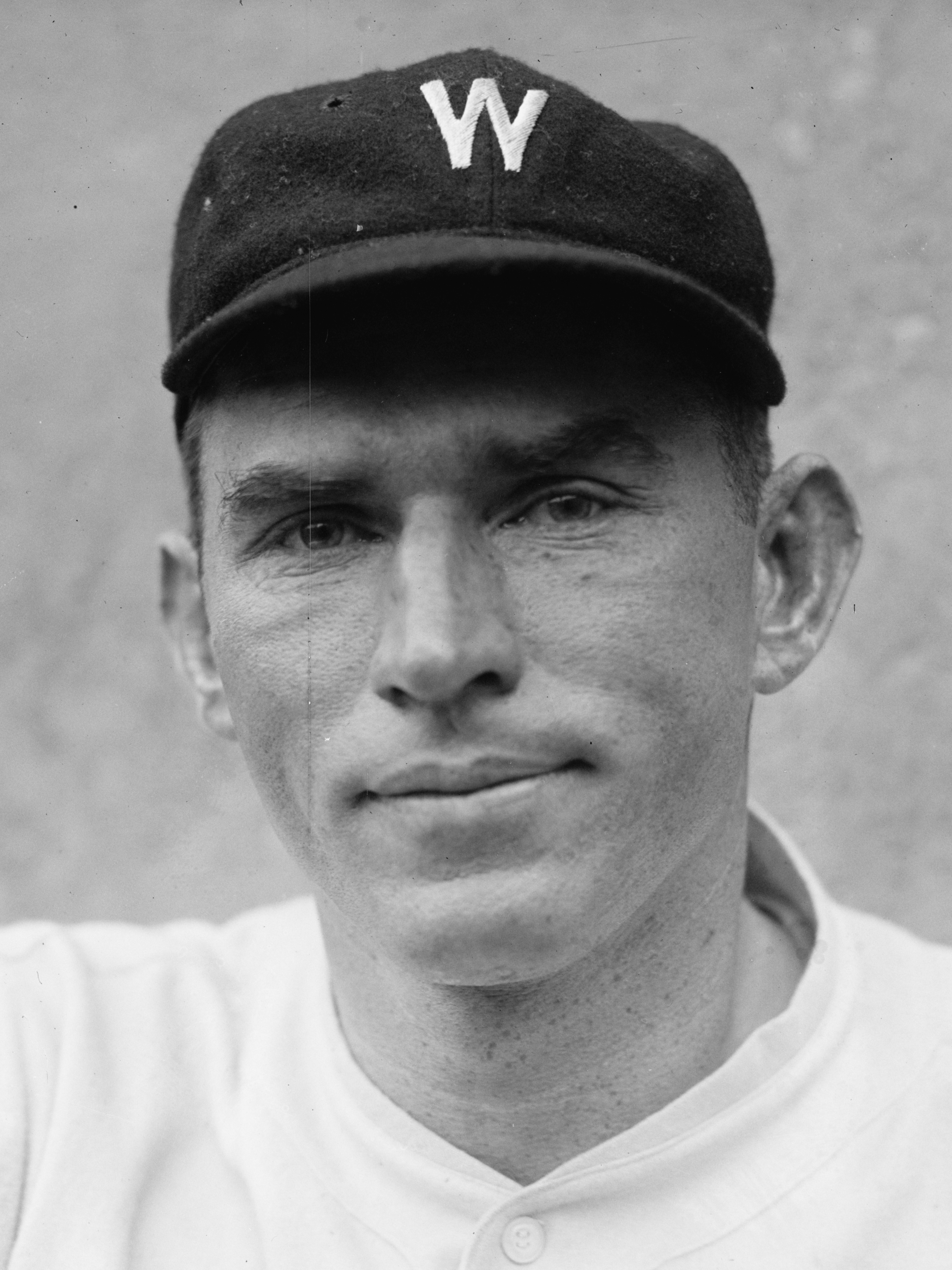
- Zachary with the Washington Senators in 1924
- Pitcher
- Born: May 7, 1896; Graham, North Carolina, U.S.
- Died: January 24, 1969 (aged 72); Burlington, North Carolina, U.S.
- Batted: Left Threw: Left

MLB debut
- July 11, 1918, for the Philadelphia Athletics

Last MLB appearance
- May 28, 1936, for the Philadelphia Phillies

MLB statistics
- Win–loss record: 186–191
- Earned run average: 3.73
- Strikeouts: 720
- Stats at Baseball Reference

Teams
- Philadelphia Athletics (1918); Washington Senators (1919–1925); St. Louis Browns (1926–1927); Washington Senators (1927–1928); New York Yankees (1928–1930); Boston Braves (1930–1934); Brooklyn Dodgers (1934–1936); Philadelphia Phillies (1936)

Career highlights and awards
- 2× World Series champion (1924, 1928)

Jonathan Thompson Walton Zachary (May 7, 1896 – January 24, 1969) was an American professional baseball pitcher. He played in Major League Baseball (MLB) for 19 seasons. A left-handed pitcher, he spent most of his early career playing for the Washington Senators, with whom he won the 1924 World Series. He is well known for surrendering Babe Ruth's historic 60th home run in 1927, and he would become Ruth's teammate the following season. Over the course of his career, he also played for the Philadelphia A's, St. Louis Browns, New York Yankees, Boston Braves, Brooklyn Dodgers, and Philadelphia Phillies.

Zachary has the most wins in an undefeated season by a pitcher in MLB history, going 12–0 with the Yankees in 1929. The only player in any Major League to have more wins in an undefeated season is Hall of Famer Ray Brown, who went 14–0 with the Homestead Grays in the 1938 Negro National League II season.

== Early life ==
Tom Zachary was born on May 7, 1896, in the village of Saxapahaw, near Graham, North Carolina. He was born into a family of Quaker farmers, the seventh of eleven children born to Alfred L. Zachary and Mary Elvira Guthrie Zachary.

He attended Guilford College, where he was a pitcher and outfielder on the baseball team, and served as team captain. Zachary's most notable collegiate game was on April 16, 1918, when he was matched against North Carolina State College's ace and future major leaguer George Murray. The game was called at 0–0 after sixteen innings; Murray struck out 20 batters to Zachary's 14. In the summer of 1918, Zachary joined the American Red Cross, and was assigned to duty in Europe during World War I. While preparing to ship out, he tried out for the Philadelphia Athletics under Connie Mack, pitching in and winning two games under the name Zachary Walton, a pseudonym he used to preserve his amateur status. After spending a year in Europe, Zachary attempted to rejoin the Athletics, but was not offered a contract.

== Career ==
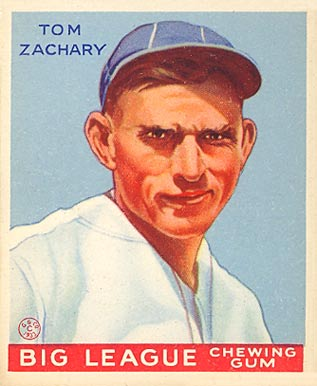
1933 Goudey baseball card of Tom Zachary

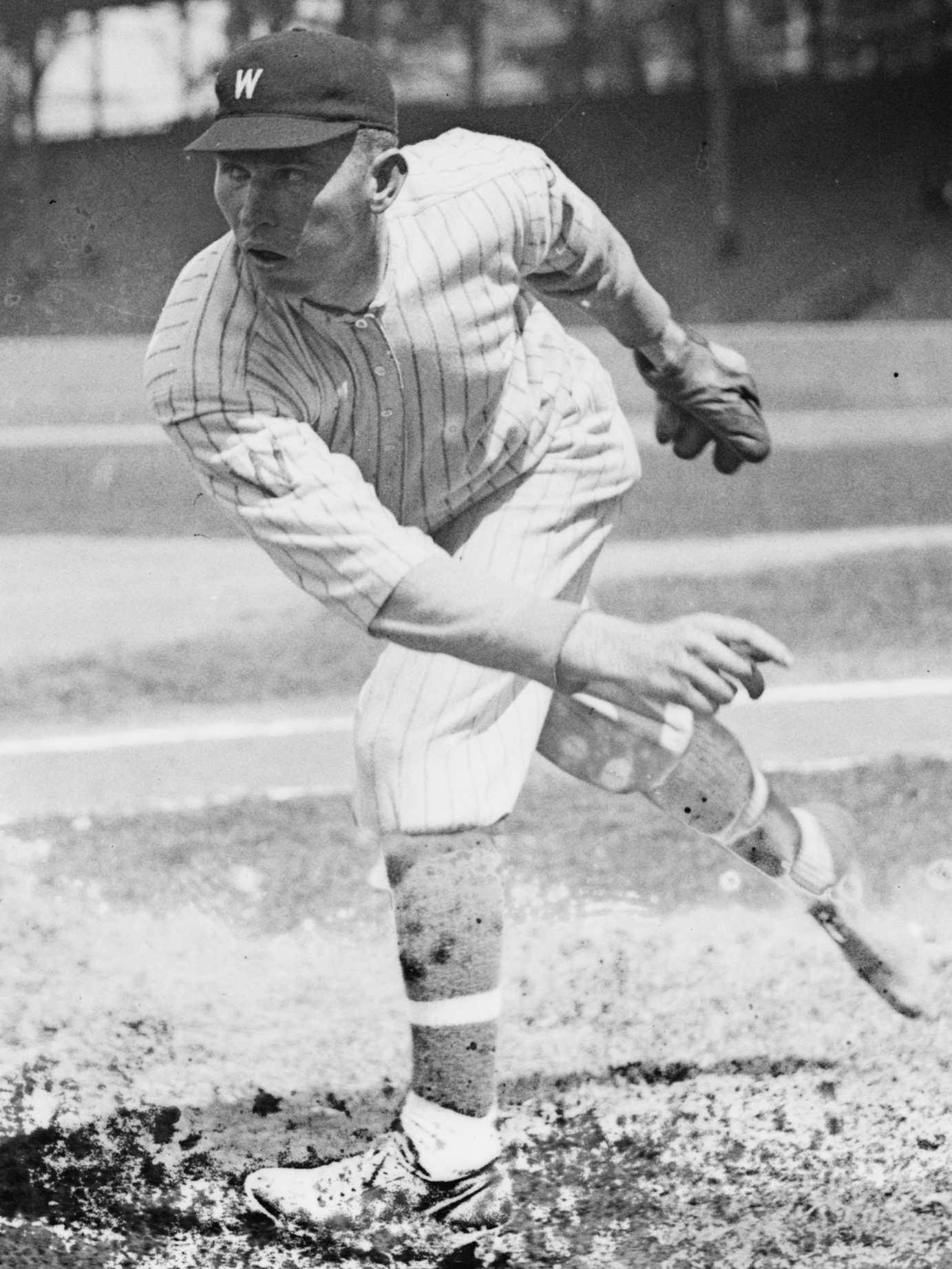
Zachary in 1920

Zachary contacted and tried out for Clark Griffith, manager of the Washington Senators, in the summer of 1919. He was signed to a major league contract, and never played in the minor leagues. In his first season with the Senators, he appeared in 17 games (starting 7), and went 1-5 with a 2.92 ERA.

In 1924, Zachary went 15-9 with a 2.75 ERA in 202.2 innings pitched. He helped pitch the Senators to the World Series, where they faced John McGraw's New York Giants. As the Senators' number-two starter (behind Walter Johnson), Zachary started Games 2 and 6 of the Series, winning both. His performance in Game 6 was crucial in forcing a Game 7, which the Senators won behind Walter Johnson to take the Series.

In February 1926, Zachary was traded to the St. Louis Browns. He remained with the Browns until midway through the 1927 season, when he was traded back to the Senators. On September 30, 1927, Zachary gave up Babe Ruth's record-setting 60th home run. Ruth's shot barely cleared the right field foul pole, leading Zachary to suspect it was foul. There was no enmity between the two men, however, as Zachary and Ruth would become teammates and friends when the New York Yankees claimed Zachary off waivers the following season.

Pitching for the Yankees, Zachary won Game 3 of the 1928 World Series, defeating the St. Louis Cardinals. The Yankees would sweep the Series in four games, earning Zachary his second World Series. In 1929, Zachary went 12–0 with a 2.48 ERA, which led to The Sporting News declaring him "A.L. Pitcher of the Year" thanks to his low ERA, although Lefty Grove is currently recognized as the 1929 ERA champion since Zachary did not pitch enough innings by modern standards to qualify.

Zachary was claimed off waivers by the Boston Braves in May 1930, and spent three full seasons with the team before he was signed by the Brooklyn Dodgers in 1934. He appeared in 48 games for the Dodgers under Casey Stengel, posting a 12-18 record. He retired in 1936 after a stint with the Philadelphia Phillies.

=== Pitching style ===
Zachary was known to be a control pitcher, relying on accuracy and deception rather than velocity. He primarily threw a fastball, curveball, and knuckleball, and used a variety of other offspeed pitches. He would often change paces and "slop" the ball at low speeds towards opposing batters to tempt them into swinging away. In addition, he was known for his composure on the mound, rarely showing any signs of agitation in jams.

He was a very good hitting pitcher, posting a .226 batting average (254-for-1122) with 79 runs, 6 home runs, 112 RBI and drawing 62 bases on balls. He had a career high 14 RBI in 1926 and batted a career high .306 (22-for-72) in 1928.

== Later life ==
Zachary returned to North Carolina after retirement, and began farming tobacco. He was present at Yankee Stadium when Babe Ruth's number 3 was retired on June 13, 1948.

Zachary died on January 24, 1969, aged 72, after a series of strokes. He was survived by his wife, Etta (m. 1931), and two children.

== See also ==
- List of baseball players who went directly to Major League Baseball
