= Win Ballou =

American baseball player

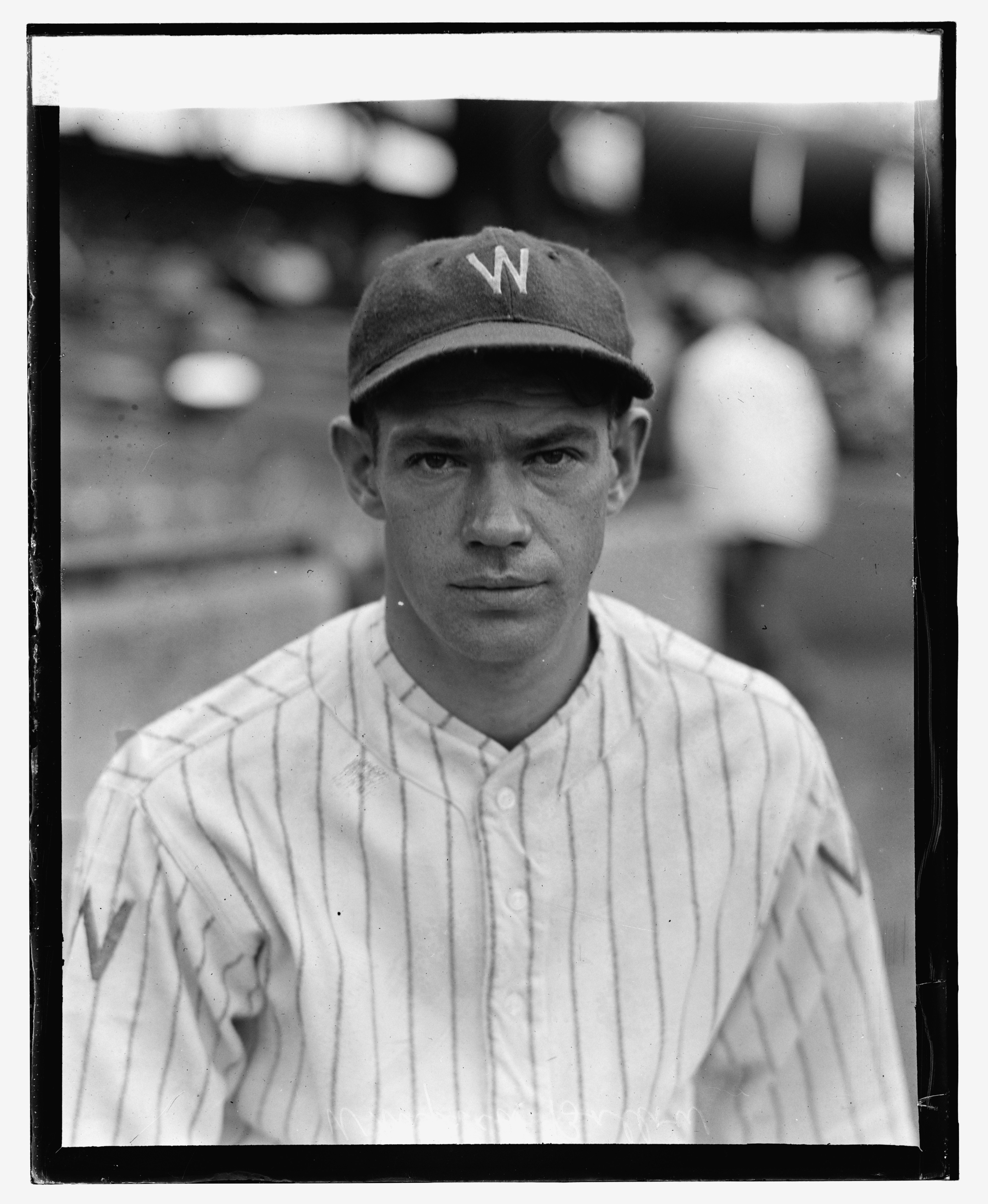
- Pitcher
- Born: November 30, 1897; Mount Morgan, Kentucky
- Died: January 30, 1963 (aged 65); San Francisco, California
- Batted: Right Threw: Right

MLB debut
- August 24, 1925, for the Washington Senators

Last MLB appearance
- September 15, 1929, for the Brooklyn Robins

MLB statistics
- Win–loss record: 19–20
- Earned run average: 5.11
- Strikeouts: 109
- Stats at Baseball Reference

Teams
- Washington Senators (1925); St. Louis Browns (1926–1927); Brooklyn Robins (1929)

Career highlights and awards
- Participated in 1925 World Series

Noble Winfred Ballou (November 30, 1897 – January 30, 1963) was an American professional baseball pitcher who appeared in 99 games, 71 of them as a reliever, in Major League Baseball between 1925 and 1929 for the Washington Senators, St. Louis Browns and Brooklyn Robins. The native of Mount Morgan, Kentucky, stood 5 feet 10 inches (1.78 m) tall, weighed 170 pounds (77 kg), and threw and batted right-handed. He spent his college days at Eastern Kentucky University.

Ballou's pitching career took place over 21 seasons between 1922 and 1944. As a big-league rookie in 1925, he worked in ten games for the American League champion Senators, and appeared in Games 5 and 6 of the 1925 World Series. He threw 1 2/3 innings of hitless, shutout relief, but Washington lost both games en route to a seven-game defeat at the hands of the Pittsburgh Pirates. Traded to St. Louis the following February, Ballou appeared in 43 games for the 1926 Browns and won 11 games, second on the club, and saved two more for a team that finished seventh and won only 62 games all year. He pitched less frequently in 1927, getting into 21 games, and the Browns sent him to the Milwaukee Brewers of the minor-league American Association, where he spent all of 1928 and won 14 games. In his final major-league season, 1929, he appeared in 25 games for the Brooklyn Robins, but he was ineffective and his MLB career ended at age 31.

In his 99 career games, Ballou won 19 games and lost 20, with ten complete games, no shutouts and three saves. In 329 2/3 innings pitched, he allowed 398 hits, 168 bases on balls and 187 earned runs, for a career ERA of 5.11. He struck out 109.

Ballou continued to pitch professionally in the top-level Pacific Coast League for 14 more seasons. He won 24 games (losing 13) for the Los Angeles Angels in 1931, then posted an 18–8 record for the 1935 San Francisco Seals.

He died in San Francisco, aged 65, on January 29, 1963.
