= Herschel Bennett =

American baseball player (1896-1964)

- Outfielder
- Born: September 21, 1896; Elwood, Missouri, U.S.
- Died: September 9, 1964 (aged 67); Springfield, Missouri, U.S.
- Batted: Left Threw: Right

MLB debut
- April 19, 1923, for the St. Louis Browns

Last MLB appearance
- October 1, 1927, for the St. Louis Browns

MLB statistics
- Batting average: .276
- Hits: 242
- Stolen bases: 13
- Stats at Baseball Reference

Teams
- St. Louis Browns (1923–1927)

Herschel Emmett Bennett (September 21, 1896 – September 9, 1964) was an American Major League Baseball outfielder who played for five seasons. He played for the St. Louis Browns from 1923 to 1927.

== Minor leagues ==
Bennett began playing baseball with local semi-pro teams during the late 1910s, then he started his professional career in the minor leagues, playing for the Springfield Merchants in 1920. He played with the Tulsa Oilers of the Western League from 1921 to 1923. In 1922, he hit .370 in 161 games, and hit 13 triples and 24 home runs as well that season. At the conclusion of the 1922 season, the St. Louis Browns purchased his contract for $10,000.

== Major Leagues ==
Although he spent most of the 1923 season with Tulsa, he did play in five games for the St. Louis Browns during the 1923 St. Louis Browns season, making his major league debut on April 19, 1923. In 1924, Bennett played in 41 games for the Browns with a batting average of .330. However, he suffered a broken arm, and was out for the rest of the season.

The next three seasons saw Bennett splitting time between left field and right field, backing up Ken Williams and Harry Rice. During the 1925 St. Louis Browns season, Bennett played in 93 games and had a career high six triples with a batting average of .279. The following season his average dipped to .267, and then to .266. He played in the final of his 312 major league games on October 1, 1927, and finished his career with 13 triples, 13 stolen bases, a .276 batting average, and seven home runs. At one point during the 1927 season, he crashed into a wall while playing against Philadelphia at Shibe Park, which caused him to fall into a 36-hour coma and helped bring about the end of his major league career.

== Minors and dispute ==
Over the next few years, Bennett played with several different minor league teams, including the Milwaukee Brewers in 1928, with whom he played 111 games. Bennett became the subject of a feud between Browns owner Phil Ball and commissioner Kenesaw Mountain Landis. Bennett claimed that his frequent moving in the farm system prevented him from getting a chance to play in the majors, to which Landis ordered Ball to put him on the major league roster or release him, with Ball. When a federal judge ruled in Landis' favor on this issue, claiming interference in private property, judge Walter Lindley also ruled that the farm system in baseball was legitimate, which is what Landis tried to avoid with this ruling on Bennett.

After baseball, Bennett went on to become the Commissioner of Revenue in Springfield, Missouri. He died on September 9, 1964.

== Personal life ==
Bennett was married to Gladys Gertrude Bennett (Cloud) (1899–1974). They later divorced, remarried, and divorced again. They had three children, twins Robert C. Bennett (1919–2009) and William Bennett, and Herschel Bennett (1930–2012).
