= George Smith (American League pitcher) =

American baseball player (1901–1981)

- Pitcher
- Born: October 27, 1901; Louisville, Kentucky, U.S.
- Died: May 26, 1981 (aged 79); Richmond, Virginia, U.S.
- Batted: Right Threw: Right

MLB debut
- April 21, 1926, for the Detroit Tigers

Last MLB appearance
- September 17, 1930, for the Boston Red Sox

MLB statistics
- Win–loss record: 10–8
- Earned run average: 5.28
- Strikeouts: 135

Teams
- Detroit Tigers (1926–29); Boston Red Sox (1930)

George Shelby Smith (October 27, 1901 – May 26, 1981) was a middle relief pitcher in Major League Baseball who played from 1926 through 1930 for the Detroit Tigers (1926–1929) and Boston Red Sox (1930). Listed at 6 ft 1 in (1.85 m), 175 lb., Smith batted and threw right-handed. He was born in Louisville, Kentucky.

In a four-season career, Smith posted 10–8 record with a 5.28 ERA in 132 appearances, including seven starts, one complete game, saves, 135 strikeouts, and 330 2/3 innings of work.

He gave up one of Babe Ruth's record-setting 60 home runs during the 1927 New York Yankees season.

Smith died at the age of 79 in Richmond, Virginia.
