= Jess Doyle =

American baseball player (1898–1961)

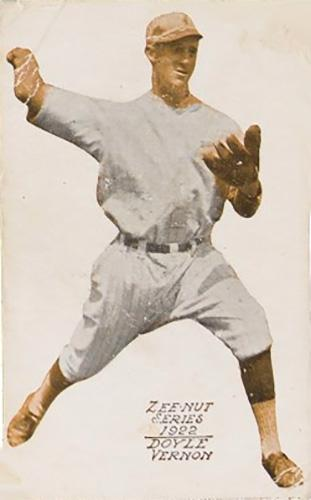
- Pitcher
- Born: April 14, 1898; Knoxville, Tennessee
- Died: April 15, 1961 (aged 63); Belleville, Illinois
- Batted: Right Threw: Right

MLB debut
- April 14, 1925, for the Detroit Tigers

Last MLB appearance
- July 9, 1931, for the St. Louis Browns

MLB statistics
- Win–loss record: 4–7
- Strikeouts: 38
- Earned run average: 6.22
- Stats at Baseball Reference

Teams
- Detroit Tigers (1925–1927); St. Louis Browns (1931)

Jesse Herbert Doyle (April 14, 1898 – April 15, 1961) was a Major League Baseball pitcher. He pitched in four major league seasons, 1925 through 1927 for the Detroit Tigers, and 1931 for the St. Louis Browns.

== Sources ==
- Career statistics from Baseball Reference, or Baseball Reference (Minors)
