= Billy Mullen =

American baseball player (1896–1971)

- Third baseman
- Born: January 23, 1896; St. Louis, Missouri, U.S.
- Died: May 4, 1971 (aged 75); St. Louis, Missouri, U.S.
- Batted: Right Threw: Right

MLB debut
- October 2, 1920, for the St. Louis Browns

Last MLB appearance
- June 5, 1928, for the St. Louis Browns

MLB statistics
- Batting average: .220
- Home runs: 0
- Runs batted in: 2
- Stats at Baseball Reference

Teams
- St. Louis Browns (1920–1921); Brooklyn Robins (1923); Detroit Tigers (1926); St. Louis Browns (1928)

William John Mullen (January 23, 1896 – May 4, 1971) was an American professional baseball player who played third base from 1920 to 1928.

== Surviving family ==
Bill Mullen is survived by his daughter, June Mitchell, and her three sons, Tom, Robert, and Terry Mitchell. Tom owned a jazz restaurant in Cocoa Beach, Florida for some time until 2008, and now works for Kennedy Space Center. Also survived by his daughter, Dorothy Murray, and her three children, the late Linda Best (Murray), William Murray of Kirkwood, Mo. and Kim Higgins (Murray), Sappington, Missouri.
