= Augie Johns =

American baseball player (1899–1975)

- Pitcher
- Born: September 10, 1899; St. Louis, Missouri, U.S.
- Died: September 12, 1975 (aged 76); San Antonio, Texas, U.S.
- Batted: Left Threw: Left

MLB debut
- April 16, 1926, for the Detroit Tigers

Last MLB appearance
- April 23, 1927, for the Detroit Tigers

MLB statistics
- Win–loss record: 6-4
- Earned run average: 5.38
- Strikeouts: 41
- Stats at Baseball Reference

Teams
- Detroit Tigers (1926–1927)

Augustus Francis Johns (September 10, 1899 – September 12, 1975) was a pitcher in Major League Baseball. He played for the Detroit Tigers.
