= Chet Falk =

American baseball player (1905–1982)

- Pitcher
- Born: May 15, 1905; Austin, Texas
- Died: January 7, 1982 (aged 76); Austin, Texas
- Batted: Left Threw: Left

MLB debut
- April 20, 1925, for the St. Louis Browns

Last MLB appearance
- June 28, 1927, for the St. Louis Browns

MLB statistics
- Win–loss record: 5–4
- Earned run average: 6.04
- Strikeouts: 16
- Stats at Baseball Reference

Teams
- St. Louis Browns (1925–1927)

Chester Emanuel "Chet" Falk (May 15, 1905; Austin, Texas – January 7, 1982; Austin, Texas), nicknamed "Spot", was an American Major League baseball player who pitched for the St. Louis Browns from 1925 to 1927.
