= Ernie Wingard =

American baseball player (1900-1977)

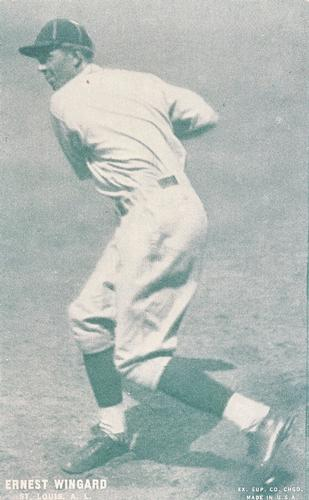
- Pitcher
- Born: October 17, 1900; Prattville, Alabama, U.S.
- Died: January 17, 1977 (aged 76); Prattville, Alabama, U.S.
- Batted: Left Threw: Left

MLB debut
- May 1, 1924, for the St. Louis Browns

Last MLB appearance
- September 25, 1927, for the St. Louis Browns

MLB statistics
- Win–loss record: 29-43
- Earned run average: 4.64
- Strikeouts: 101
- Stats at Baseball Reference

Teams
- St. Louis Browns (1924–27)

Ernest James Wingard (October 17, 1900 – January 17, 1977), nicknamed "Jim", was an American professional baseball pitcher. He played four seasons in Major League Baseball for the St. Louis Browns. He started 77 games and relieved in 68 from 1924 to 1927. Wingard's best season was his first, his 3.51 ERA was 10th best in the American League and his 5.1 WAR ranked 9th in the AL, according to Baseball Reference.

He was a good hitting pitcher in his major league career, posting a .232 batting average (57-for-246) with 30 runs, 7 home runs and 38 RBI in 156 games.

Wingard's baseball career would continue in the minor leagues through 1941, including a few seasons as a manager between 1936 and 1941.
