= Pinky Hargrave =

American baseball player (1896–1942)

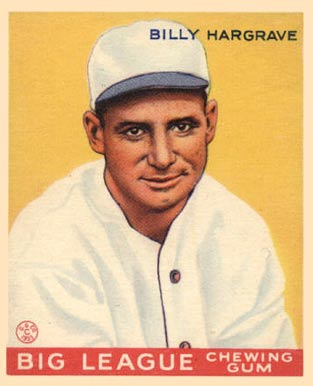
- Pinky Hargrave 1933 Goudey baseball card
- Catcher
- Born: January 31, 1896; New Haven, Indiana, U.S.
- Died: October 3, 1942 (aged 46); Fort Wayne, Indiana, U.S.
- Batted: Both Threw: Right

MLB debut
- May 18, 1923, for the Washington Senators

Last MLB appearance
- September 23, 1933, for the Boston Braves

MLB statistics
- Batting average: .278
- Home runs: 39
- Runs batted in: 265
- Stats at Baseball Reference

Teams
- Washington Senators (1923–1925); St. Louis Browns (1925–1926); Detroit Tigers (1928–1930); Washington Senators (1930–1931); Boston Braves (1932–1933)

William McKinley "Pinky" Hargrave (January 31, 1896 – October 3, 1942) was an American baseball catcher. He played professional baseball for 19 years from 1919 to 1937, including 10 years in Major League Baseball with the Washington Senators (1923–1925, 1930–1931), St. Louis Browns (1925–1926), Detroit Tigers (1928–1930), and Boston Braves (1932–1933).

== Early years ==
Hargrave was born in New Haven, Indiana, in 1896. He was the younger brother of Bubbles Hargrave, who was a catcher in the major leagues between 1913 and 1930.

== Professional baseball ==
Hargrave began playing professional baseball for Waterbury in the Eastern League in 1919 and 1920. He next played for the New Haven Weissmen in the Eastern League from 1920 to 1922. He compiled a .321 batting average for New Haven in 119 games during the 1922 season.

He made his major league debut at age 27 on May 18, 1923, with the Washington Senators. On June 18, 1925, the Senators traded Hargrave and George Mogridge to the St. Louis Browns for Hank Severeid.

In 10 major league seasons, Hargrave played in 650 games (442 as catcher) and hit .278 with a .339 on-base percentage and a .428 slugging percentage. He had 1,452 putouts, 445 hits, 265 RBIs, 246 assists, 177 runs, 146 extra base hits, and 140 walks. He recorded a career .976 fielding percentage. His best season was 1929 with the Tigers, when he batted .330. Hargrave played his last major league game on September 23, 1933.

Hargrave continued to play in the minor leagues for five additional years. He played for the Minneapolis Millers from 1934 to 1936 and was selected in 1934, at age 38, as the Most Valuable Player in the American Association after compiling a .356 batting average with 17 home runs. He concluded his career with the Syracuse Chiefs in the International League in 1938.

== Later years ==
After retiring from baseball, Hargrave worked at a municipal light plant in Fort Wayne, Indiana. He also worked as an umpire for Big Ten Conference baseball games. He died of a heart attack in November 1942 while helping to convert a Fort Wayne baseball field into a football field.
