= Bobby LaMotte =

American baseball player (1898–1970)

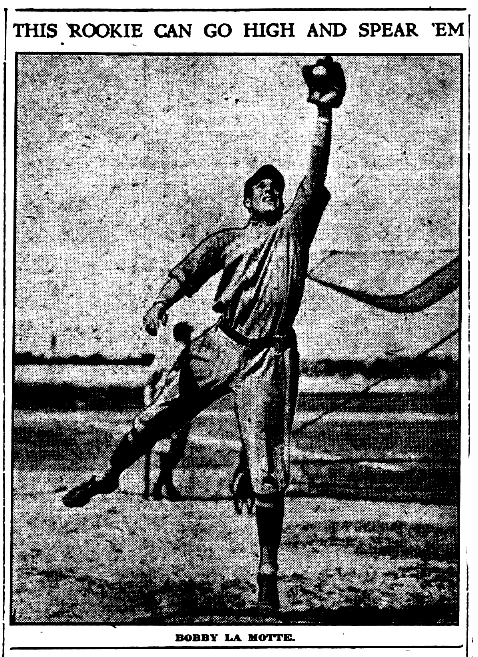
- Shortstop
- Born: February 15, 1898; Savannah, Georgia, U.S.
- Died: November 2, 1970 (aged 72); Chatham, Georgia, U.S.
- Batted: Right Threw: Right

MLB debut
- September 1, 1920, for the Washington Senators

Last MLB appearance
- July 11, 1926, for the St. Louis Browns

MLB statistics
- Batting average: .253
- Home runs: 3
- Runs batted in: 85
- Stats at Baseball Reference

Teams
- Washington Senators (1920–1922); St. Louis Browns (1925–1926)

Robert Eugene LaMotte (February 15, 1898 – November 2, 1970) was an American professional baseball infielder who played in Major League Baseball (MLB) for the Washington Senators (1920–1922) and the St. Louis Browns (1925–1926). He played primarily as a shortstop, but also played about one-third of his games as a third baseman.

After his playing career ended, LaMotte was a manager for the minor league Savannah Indians in 1936 and Macon Peaches in 1946.
