= 1948 Baseball Hall of Fame balloting =

Elections to the Baseball Hall of Fame

National Baseball

Hall of Fame and Museum
- New inductees: 2
- via BBWAA: 2
- Total inductees: 55
- Induction date: June 13, 1949

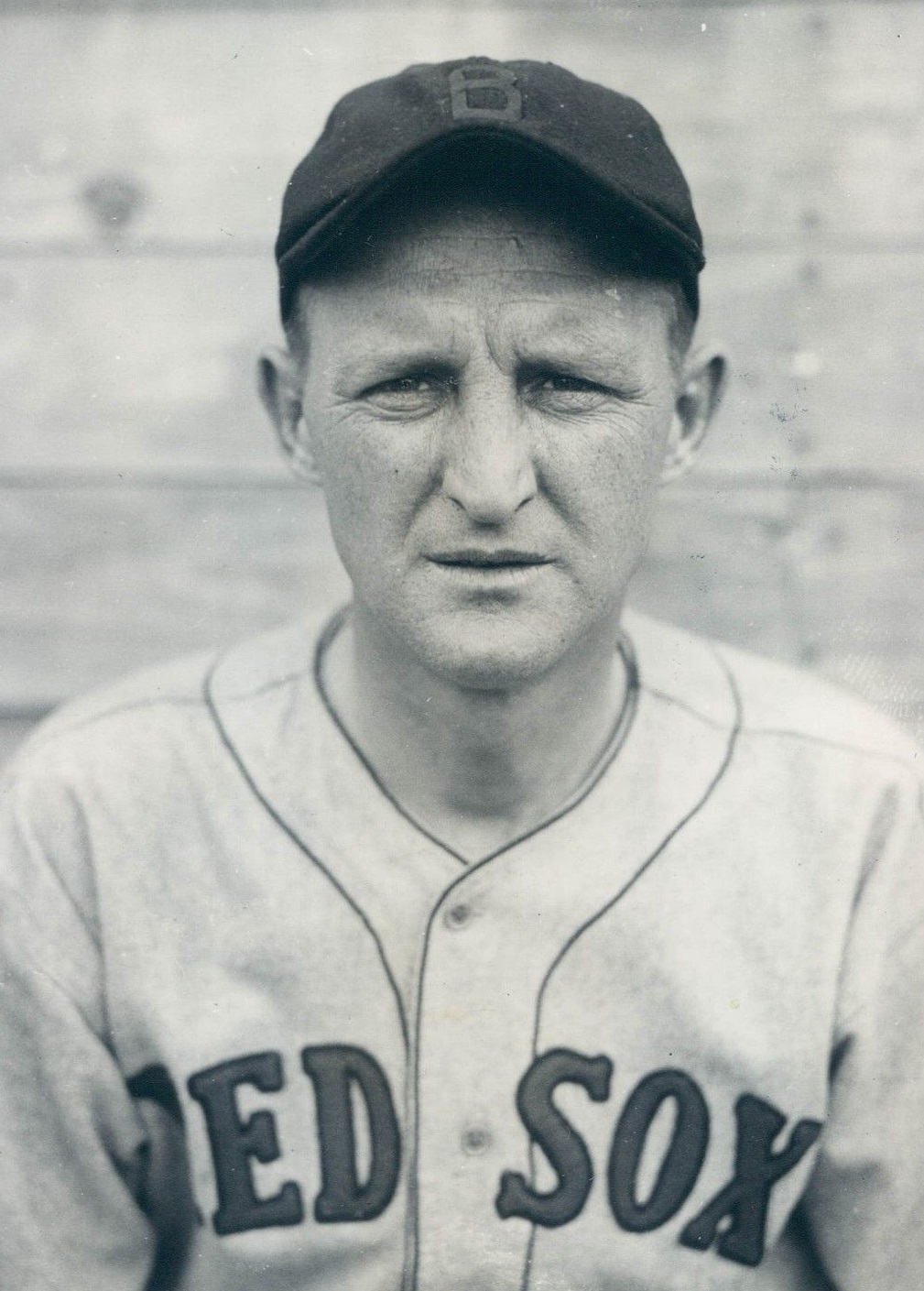
1948 inductees Herb Pennock (left) and Pie Traynor

Elections to the Baseball Hall of Fame for 1948 followed the same procedures as 1947. The Baseball Writers' Association of America (BBWAA) voted by mail to select from players retired less than 25 years, with provision for a runoff in case of no winner. It elected two people on the first ballot, Herb Pennock and Pie Traynor. Meanwhile, the Old Timers Committee, with jurisdiction over earlier players, met on no schedule and not this year. Criticism continued that earlier players, as well as managers and other non-playing candidates, were being overlooked.

While an induction ceremony had initially been planned for 1948, it was postponed, although the annual Hall of Fame Game was still played on July 12, 1948. Pennock and Traynor were subsequently inducted with the 1949 Hall of Fame selections in Cooperstown, New York, on June 13, 1949. Traynor attended the ceremony; Pennock had died in January 1948, several weeks before the baseball writers elected him.

== BBWAA election ==
The 10-year members of the BBWAA had the authority to select any players active in 1923 or later, provided they had been retired since 1946. Voters were instructed to cast votes for 10 candidates; any candidate receiving votes on at least 75% of the ballots would be honored with induction to the Hall. If no candidate received votes on 75% of the ballots, the top 20 candidates would advance to a runoff election, with the vote totals from the first ballot not being revealed until the runoff was over.

A total of 121 ballots were cast - the lowest total for any BBWAA election - with 1,036 individual votes for 106 specific candidates, an average of 8.56 per ballot; 91 votes were required for election. The results were announced on February 27, 1948. The election was a success for the second year in a row following the most recent format change, with two more inductees to the Hall being selected; again, no runoff was necessary. Herb Pennock, who received the most votes and was elected, had died suddenly of a cerebral hemorrhage just weeks earlier on January 30; however, he had done increasingly well in previous elections, and many ballots had already been cast, making it unlikely that his election was primarily due to sentiment.

The number of players receiving votes (106) was a significant increase over the previous year's total of 39, and the highest number since the 1939 election. After the 1947 election in which voters had just a few weeks to select candidates following the disqualification of players retired over 25 years, voters in 1948 had a full year in which to look for candidates who had retired between 1923 and 1946, and a wide variety of new candidates drew votes. 80 of those named received votes on less than 5% of the ballots, with 36 receiving only a single vote; 45 players were named for the first time, although all had been eligible at some point in the past - for some, the 1936 election in which active players were eligible. All but 3 of the eligible candidates who received any votes in the 1947 election were again named in the voting.

As had been the case in 1947, the focus was now on the most recent players; those who retired in the 1920s generally saw their vote totals decrease from the previous year, while more recent players advanced even further in the voting. Due to the scarcity of precise historical records, some voters may have refrained from voting for players of the 1920s due to uncertainty as to their eligibility. Only 5 of the top 30 candidates, and none of the top 14, had retired before 1931. Of the 106 players named, 29 retired before 1930; they received only 12% of the vote. These totals include eight ineligible players who retired before 1923 - including Johnny Kling, retired since 1913 - who nevertheless received 2 votes; this may have been due to uncertainty as to their retirement date, or perhaps as a voter response to the lack of any selections by the Old-Timers Committee the previous year. Votes for notable managers such as Miller Huggins increased, perhaps also in response to the lack of 1947 honors in that area.

Chief Bender, who last played regularly in 1917, received 5 votes; he was technically eligible due to a single inning pitched in 1925, but the drop from his 1947 total of 72 votes suggests either that most voters were unaware of that fact or that they viewed it as irrelevant regarding the spirit of the rules. Dizzy Dean, who finished 8th in the 1947 balloting with 88 votes, had come out of retirement to start one game in 1947; nevertheless, 40 votes were cast for him by those who felt that this single appearance should not affect his retired status and eligibility. Four other players who made their last major league appearances in 1947, including Red Ruffing and Stan Hack, got a handful of votes; Joe Medwick, still active, received one vote.

The induction ceremony in Cooperstown was not held until the following year, on July 12, 1949, with inductee Pie Traynor present.

The two candidates who received at least 75% of the vote and were elected are indicated in bold italics; candidates who have since been selected in subsequent elections are indicated in italics:

Player	Votes	Percent	Change
**Herb Pennock**	94	77.7	▲24.3%
**Pie Traynor**	93	76.9	▲3.0%
Al Simmons	60	49.6	▲45.9%
Charlie Gehringer	52	43.0	▼22.2%
Bill Terry	52	43.0	▲14.4%
Paul Waner	51	42.1	-
Jimmie Foxx	50	41.3	▲35.1%
Dizzy Dean	40	33.1	▼21.6%
Harry Heilmann	40	33.1	▼7.3%
Bill Dickey	39	32.2	-
Rabbit Maranville	38	31.4	▼25.1%
Gabby Hartnett	33	27.3	▲26.1%
Joe Cronin	25	20.7	▲17.0%
Dazzy Vance	23	19.0	▼12.1%
Ray Schalk	22	18.2	▼12.9%
Tony Lazzeri	21	17.4	▲16.8%
Ross Youngs	19	15.7	▼6.7%
Edd Roush	17	14.0	▼1.5%
Lefty Gomez	16	13.2	▲12.6%
Ted Lyons	15	12.4	-
Zack Wheat	15	12.4	▼10.6%
Max Carey	9	7.4	-
Jimmie Wilson	8	6.6	-
Burleigh Grimes	7	5.8	-
Waite Hoyt	7	5.8	-
Pepper Martin	7	5.8	-
Earle Combs	6	5.0	-
Charlie Grimm	6	5.0	-
Rube Marquard	6	5.0	▼6.2%
Bob Meusel	6	5.0	-
Chief Bender	5	4.1	▼40.6%
Jimmy Dykes	5	4.1	-
Travis Jackson	5	4.1	-
Stuffy McInnis	5	4.1	-
Eppa Rixey	5	4.1	▲2.9%
Smoky Joe Wood	5	4.1	▼13.9%
Babe Adams	4	3.3	▼10.4%
Frank Baker	4	3.3	▼27.1%
Dave Bancroft	4	3.3	-
Jim Bottomley	4	3.3	-
Miller Huggins	4	3.3	-
Lefty O'Doul	4	3.3	-
Red Ruffing	4	3.3	-
Kiki Cuyler	3	2.5	-
Joe Dugan	3	2.5	-
George Earnshaw	3	2.5	-
Red Faber	3	2.5	-
Art Fletcher	3	2.5	▲0.6%
Hank Gowdy	3	2.5	▲1.9%
Bucky Harris	3	2.5	-
Chuck Klein	3	2.5	-
Eddie Rommel	3	2.5	-
Charlie Root	3	2.5	-
Everett Scott	3	2.5	▲1.9%
Ossie Bluege	2	1.7	-
Jack Coombs	2	1.7	-
Wilbur Cooper	2	1.7	-
Stan Coveleski	2	1.7	-
Freddie Fitzsimmons	2	1.7	-
Stan Hack	2	1.7	-
Jesse Haines	2	1.7	▲1.1%
Babe Herman	2	1.7	-
Harry Hooper	2	1.7	-
George Kelly	2	1.7	▲1.1%
Johnny Kling	2	1.7	-
Steve O'Neill	2	1.7	-
Jack Quinn	2	1.7	-
Al Schacht	2	1.7	-
Hack Wilson	2	1.7	-
Glenn Wright	2	1.7	-
Dick Bartell	1	0.8	-
Carson Bigbee	1	0.8	-
Leon Cadore	1	0.8	-
Dolph Camilli	1	0.8	-
Spud Davis	1	0.8	-
Paul Derringer	1	0.8	-
Leo Durocher	1	0.8	-
Wes Ferrell	1	0.8	-
Lew Fonseca	1	0.8	-
Goose Goslin	1	0.8	-
Heinie Groh	1	0.8	-
Chick Hafey	1	0.8	-
Bill Hallahan	1	0.8	-
Billy Herman	1	0.8	-
Bob Johnson	1	0.8	-
Ray Kremer	1	0.8	-
Heinie Manush	1	0.8	-
Joe Medwick	1	0.8	-
Dots Miller	1	0.8	-
Hugh Mulcahy	1	0.8	-
Van Mungo	1	0.8	-
Joe Oeschger	1	0.8	-
Sam Rice	1	0.8	-
Wally Schang	1	0.8	-
Hal Schumacher	1	0.8	-
George Selkirk	1	0.8	-
Hank Severeid	1	0.8	-
Joe Sewell	1	0.8	-
Luke Sewell	1	0.8	-
Bill Sherdel	1	0.8	-
Urban Shocker	1	0.8	-
Earl Smith	1	0.8	-
Sherry Smith	1	0.8	-
Casey Stengel	1	0.8	-
Sam West	1	0.8	-
Cy Williams	1	0.8	-

Key to colors
Elected to the Hall. These individuals are also indicated in **bold italics**.
Players who were elected in future elections. These individuals are also indicated in plain italics.
