= List of Washington Senators Opening Day starting pitchers =

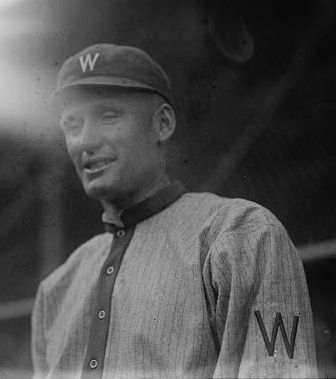
Walter Johnson made 14 Opening Day starts for the Washington Senators.

Two American League baseball franchises have borne the name "Washington Senators". The first franchise was one of the teams that was originally part of the American League when it became a Major League in 1901. That franchise moved to Minnesota after the 1960 season, becoming the Minnesota Twins. It was replaced by a new Washington Senators franchise in 1961. That franchise moved to Arlington, Texas after the 1971 season, becoming the Texas Rangers. The Washington Senators played in three home ball parks over their history. They started in American League Park and moved to American League Park II in 1903. In 1911, they moved to Griffith Stadium, where they remained until 1961. The first game of the new baseball season for a team is played on Opening Day, and being named the Opening Day starter is an honor, which is often given to the player who is expected to lead the pitching staff that season, though there are various strategic reasons why a team's best pitcher might not start on Opening Day.

The 1901-1960 franchise won 32 Opening Day games against 28 losses. The 1901-1960 franchise had a record in Opening Day games at home of 26 wins and 21 losses. On the road, they had an Opening Day record of six wins and seven losses.

The 1901-1960 franchise used 32 Opening Day starting pitchers in their 60 seasons in Washington. One pitcher made Opening Day starts for both franchises. Camilo Pascual made two Opening Day starts for the 1901-1960 franchise, in 1956 and 1960, and later made two Opening Day starts for the 1961-1971 franchise.

Walter Johnson holds the record for most Opening Day starts for either franchise, with 14 Opening Day starts for the 1901-1960 franchise between 1910 and 1926, including ten consecutive Opening Day starts from 1912 through 1921. Dutch Leonard made four Opening Day starts for the 1901-1960 franchise between 1940 and 1945. Bob Porterfield made three Opening Day starts for the 1901-1960 franchise between 1952 and 1955. Other pitchers with multiple Opening Day starts for the 1901-1960 franchise are Al Orth, Long Tom Hughes, Charlie Smith, George Mogridge, Alvin Crowder, Earl Whitehill, Early Wynn, Pedro Ramos and Pascual, with two apiece.

The Senators won three American League championships in their history, all by the 1901-1960 franchise. Their championships were won in 1924, 1925 and 1933. They won the World Series in 1924, but lost in 1925 and 1933. The Senators' Opening Day starters in their American League championship years were Johnson in 1924, Mogridge in 1925 and Crowder in 1933.

== Key ==
Season	Each year is linked to an article about that particular Senators season.
W	Win
L	Loss
ND (W)	No decision by starting pitcher; Senators won game
ND (L)	No decision by starting pitcher; Senators lost game
(W)	Senators won game; no information on starting pitcher's decision
(L)	Senators lost game; no information on starting pitcher's decision
Final Score	Game score with Senators runs listed first
Location	Stadium in italics for home game
(#)	Number of appearances as Opening Day starter with the Senators
**	American League Champions
†	World Series Champions

== 1901 through 1960 franchise ==
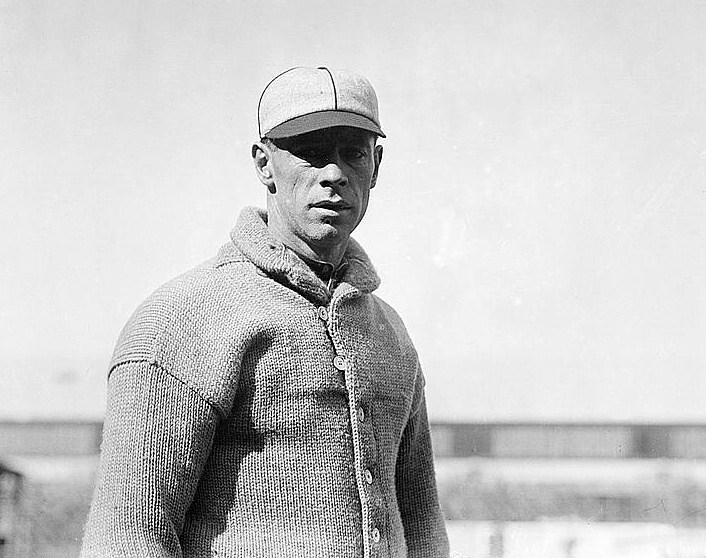
Long Tom Hughes made two Opening Day starts for the Senators.

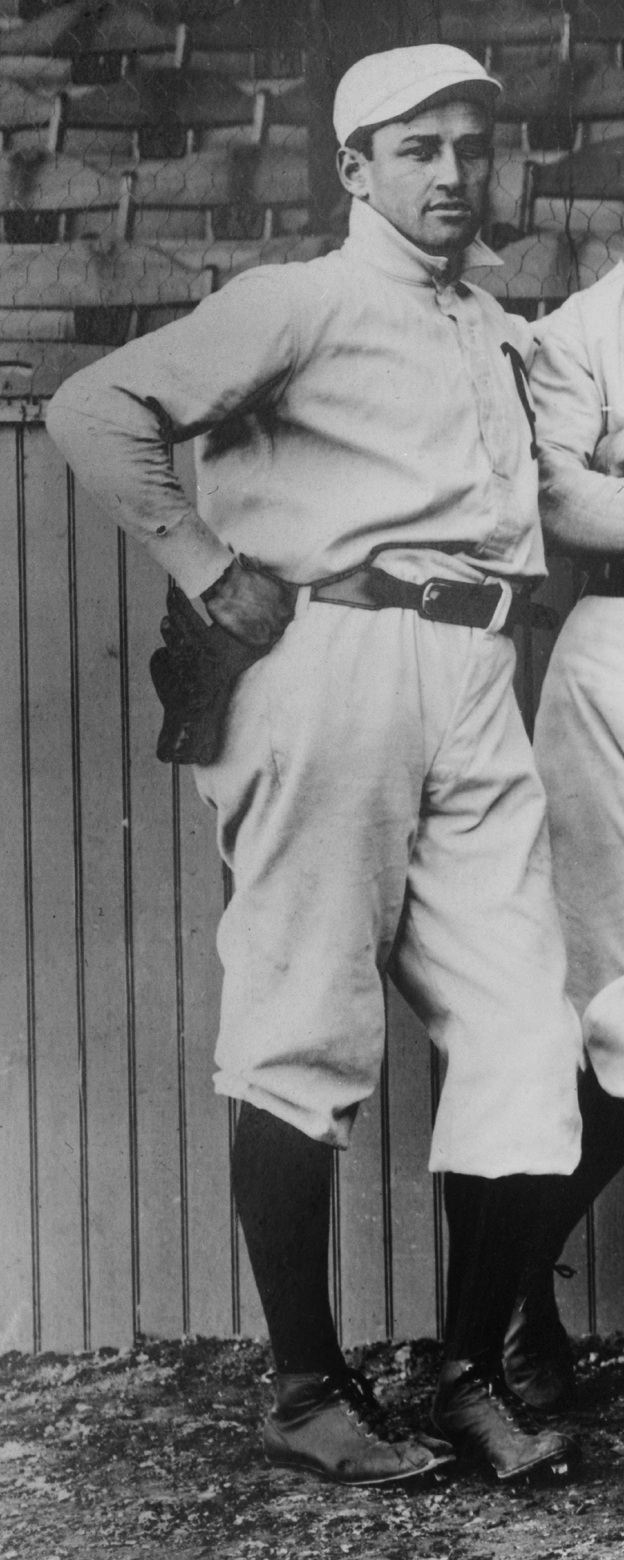
Highball Wilson was the Senators Opening Day starting pitcher in 1904.

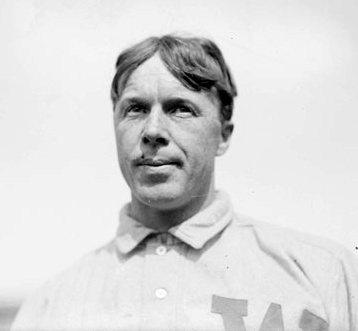
Case Patten was the Senators Opening Day starting pitcher in 1905.

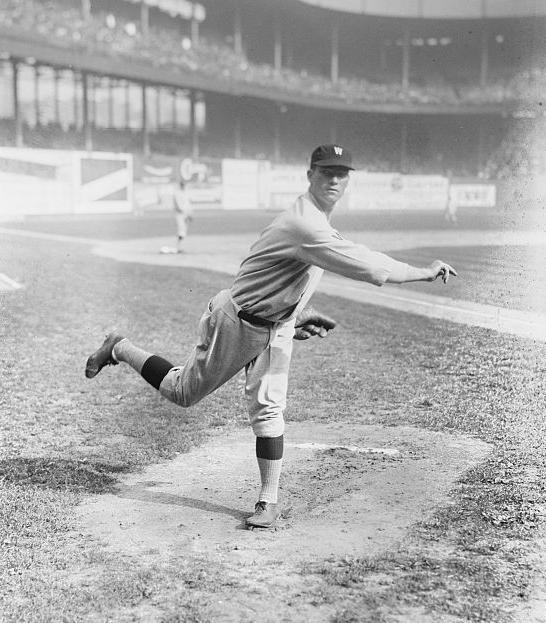
Firpo Marberry was the Senators Opening Day starting pitcher in 1930.

Season	Pitcher	Decision	Final Score	Opponent	Location	References
1901	Bill Carrick	(W)	5–1	Philadelphia Athletics	Columbia Park	
1902	Al Orth	(W)	7–3	Boston Red Sox	American League Park	
1903	Al Orth (2)	(W)	3–1	New York Yankees	American League Park II	
1904	Highball Wilson	(L)	3–8	Philadelphia Athletics	American League Park II	
1905	Case Patten	(L)	2–4	New York Yankees	American League Park II	
1906	Tom Hughes	(L)	3–4	Philadelphia Athletics	American League Park II	
1907	Tom Hughes (2)	(L)	2–3	New York Yankees	American League Park II	
1908	Charlie Smith	(L)	1–3	Boston Red Sox	Huntington Avenue Baseball Grounds	
1909	Charlie Smith (2)	(W)	4–1	New York Yankees	American League Park II	
1910	Walter Johnson	(W)	3–0	Philadelphia Athletics	American League Park II	
1911	Dolly Gray	(W)	8–5	Boston Red Sox	Griffith Stadium	
1912	Walter Johnson (2)	(L)	2–4	Philadelphia Athletics	Shibe Park	
1913	Walter Johnson (3)	(W)	2–1	New York Yankees	Griffith Stadium	
1914	Walter Johnson (4)	(W)	3–0	Boston Red Sox	Fenway Park	
1915	Walter Johnson (5)	(W)	7–0	New York Yankees	Griffith Stadium	
1916	Walter Johnson (6)	(W)	3–2	New York Yankees	Polo Grounds	
1917	Walter Johnson (7)	(W)	3–0	Philadelphia Athletics	Shibe Park	
1918	Walter Johnson (8)	(L)	3–6	New York Yankees	Griffith Stadium	
1919	Walter Johnson (9)	(W)	1–0	Philadelphia Athletics	Griffith Stadium	
1920	Walter Johnson (10)	(L)	6–7	Boston Red Sox	Fenway Park	
1921	Walter Johnson (11)	L	3–6	Boston Red Sox	Griffith Stadium	
1922	George Mogridge	W	6–5	New York Yankees	Griffith Stadium	
1923	Walter Johnson (12)	L	1–3	Philadelphia Athletics	Shibe Park	
1924†	Walter Johnson (13)	W	4–0	Philadelphia Athletics	Griffith Stadium	
1925**	George Mogridge (2)	L	1–5	New York Yankees	Yankee Stadium	
1926	Walter Johnson (14)	W	1–0	Philadelphia Athletics	Griffith Stadium	
1927	Stan Coveleski	W	6–2	Boston Red Sox	Griffith Stadium	
1928	Milt Gaston	(L)	5–7	Boston Red Sox	Griffith Stadium	
1929	Sam Jones	(L)	4–13	Philadelphia Athletics	Griffith Stadium	
1930	Firpo Marberry	(L)	3–4	Boston Red Sox	Griffith Stadium	
1931	Lloyd Brown	(L)	3–5	Philadelphia Athletics	Griffith Stadium	
1932	Alvin Crowder	W	1–0	Boston Red Sox	Griffith Stadium	
1933**	Alvin Crowder (2)	W	4–1	Philadelphia Athletics	Griffith Stadium	
1934	Earl Whitehill	ND (W)	6–5	Boston Red Sox	Fenway Park	
1935	Earl Whitehill (2)	W	4–2	Philadelphia Athletics	Griffith Stadium	
1936	Bobo Newsom	W	1–0	New York Yankees	Griffith Stadium	
1937	Joe Cascarella	(L)	3–4	Philadelphia Athletics	Griffith Stadium	
1938	Wes Ferrell	W	12–8	Philadelphia Athletics	Griffith Stadium	
1939	Jimmie DeShong	(L)	0–2	Philadelphia Athletics	Shibe Park	
1940	Dutch Leonard	(L)	0–1	Boston Red Sox	Griffith Stadium	
1941	Dutch Leonard (2)	(L)	0–3	New York Yankees	Griffith Stadium	
1942	Sid Hudson	(L)	0–7	New York Yankees	Griffith Stadium	
1943	Dutch Leonard (3)	ND (W)	7–5	Philadelphia Athletics	Griffith Stadium	
1944	Johnny Niggeling	(L)	2–3	Philadelphia Athletics	Griffith Stadium	
1945	Dutch Leonard (4)	W	14–8	Philadelphia Athletics	Shibe Park	
1946	Roger Wolff	(L)	3–6	Boston Red Sox	Griffith Stadium	
1947	Early Wynn	(L)	6–7	Boston Red Sox	Fenway Park	
1948	Early Wynn (2)	(L)	4–12	New York Yankees	Griffith Stadium	
1949	Ray Scarborough	W	3–2	Philadelphia Athletics	Griffith Stadium	
1950	Ray Scarborough (2)	W	8–7	Philadelphia Athletics	Griffith Stadium	
1951	Connie Marrero	W	6–1	Philadelphia Athletics	Griffith Stadium	
1952	Bob Porterfield	(L)	0–3	Boston Red Sox	Griffith Stadium	
1953	Bob Porterfield (2)	(L)	3–6	New York Yankees	Griffith Stadium	
1954	Chuck Stobbs	ND (W)	5–3	New York Yankees	Griffith Stadium	
1955	Bob Porterfield (3)	W	12–5	Baltimore Orioles	Griffith Stadium	
1956	Camilo Pascual^{[a]}	L	4–10	New York Yankees	Griffith Stadium	
1957	Bob Chakales	ND (L)	6–7	Baltimore Orioles	Griffith Stadium	
1958	Pedro Ramos	W	5–2	Boston Red Sox	Griffith Stadium	
1959	Pedro Ramos (2)	W	9–2	Baltimore Orioles	Griffith Stadium	
1960	Camilo Pascual^{[a]} (2)	W	10–1	Boston Red Sox	Griffith Stadium	

== Footnotes ==
- ^{a} Camilo Pascual had two Opening Day starts for the 1901-1960 franchise in 1956 and 1960 and two Opening Day starts for the 1961-1971 franchise in 1968 and 1969. He also received the decision as a relief pitcher on Opening Day 1957 for the 1901-1960 franchise.
