= Sam Rice =

American baseball player (1890–1974)

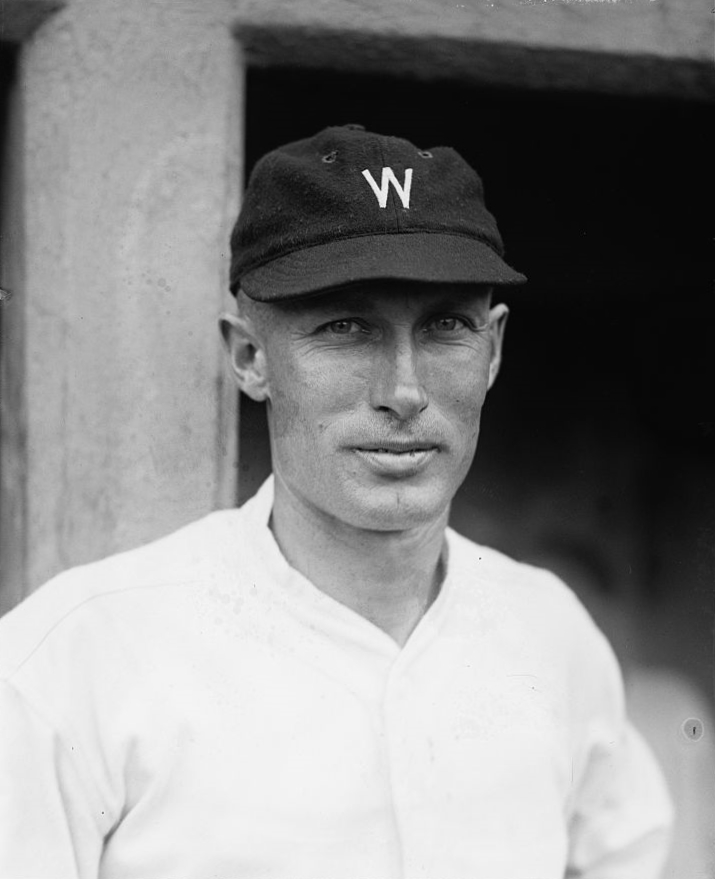
- Rice in 1924
- Outfielder
- Born: February 20, 1890; Morocco, Indiana, U.S.
- Died: October 13, 1974 (aged 84); Rossmoor, Maryland, U.S.
- Batted: Left Threw: Right

MLB debut
- August 7, 1915, for the Washington Senators

Last MLB appearance
- September 18, 1934, for the Cleveland Indians

MLB statistics
- Batting average: .322
- Hits: 2,987
- Home runs: 34
- Runs batted in: 1,078
- Stats at Baseball Reference

Teams
- Washington Senators (1915–1933); Cleveland Indians (1934)

Career highlights and awards
- World Series champion (1924); AL stolen base leader (1920); Washington Nationals Ring of Honor

Member of the National

Baseball Hall of Fame
- Induction: 1963
- Election method: Veterans Committee

Edgar Charles "Sam" Rice (February 20, 1890 – October 13, 1974) was an American pitcher and outfielder in Major League Baseball (MLB). Although Rice made his debut as a relief pitcher, he is best known as an outfielder. Playing for the Washington Senators from 1915 until 1933, he was regularly among the American League (AL) leaders in runs scored, hits, stolen bases and batting average. He led the Senators to three postseasons and a World Series championship in 1924. He batted left-handed but threw right-handed. Rice played his final year, 1934, for the Cleveland Indians. He was elected to the Baseball Hall of Fame in 1963.

Rice was best known for making a controversial catch in the 1925 World Series which carried him over the fence and into the stands. While he was alive, Rice maintained a sense of mystery around the catch, which had been ruled an out. He wrote a letter that was only opened after his 1974 death; it claimed that he had maintained possession of the ball the entire time. He collected nearly 3,000 hits in his career, with his 2,889 as a Senator being the most in franchise history.

== Early life ==
Rice was the first of six children born to Charles Rice and Louisa Newmyer. Charles and Louisa married about two months after his birth. He grew up in various towns near Morocco, Indiana, on the Indiana-Illinois border, and considered Morocco his hometown. He was known as "Eddie" during his childhood. In 1908, Rice married 16-year-old Beulah Stam. They lived in Watseka, Illinois, where Rice ran the family farm, worked at several jobs in the area, and attended tryouts for various professional baseball teams.

By April 1912, Rice and his wife had two children, aged 18 months and three years. While Rice's wife cared for the children, Rice traveled to Galesburg, Illinois, to play for a spot on a minor league baseball team, the Galesburg Pavers of the Central Association. Rice spent about a week with the team, appearing in three exhibition games. In an appearance on April 21, Rice entered the game as a relief pitcher and finished the last three innings of a Pavers victory, giving up one run in a game marked by forceful winds.

That same day, Rice's wife took their children on a day trip to the homestead of Rice's parents in Morocco, about 20 miles from Watseka. A storm arose and a tornado swept across the homestead, destroying the house and most of the outbuildings. The tornado killed Rice's wife, his two children, his mother, his two younger sisters and a farmhand. Rice's father survived for another week before also succumbing to his injuries. Rice had to attend two funerals: one for his parents and sisters, and a second for his wife and children.

Rice played for the Muscatine Muskies of the Central Association in 1912, hitting .194 in 18 games. He did not play in 1913.

== Early baseball career ==
Perhaps wracked with grief, Rice spent the next year wandering the area and working at several jobs. In 1913, he joined the United States Navy and served on the USS New Hampshire, a 16,000-ton battleship that was large enough to field a baseball team. Rice played on that team during one season. He was on the ship when it took part in the United States occupation of Veracruz, Mexico.

In 1914, Rice joined the Petersburg Goobers of the Virginia League as a pitcher. He compiled a 9–2 record with a 1.54 earned run average (ERA) that year, then returned in 1915, earning an 11–12 record with a 1.82 ERA. Petersburg team owner "Doc" Leigh owed a $300 debt to Clark Griffith, who owned the major-league Washington Senators at the time, and he offered Rice's contract to Griffith in payment of the debt. Leigh is credited with two acts which influenced Rice's subsequent career: he changed the player's name from "Edgar" to "Sam", and he convinced the Senators to let Rice play in the outfield instead of pitching.

== Major league career ==
=== First MLB seasons ===
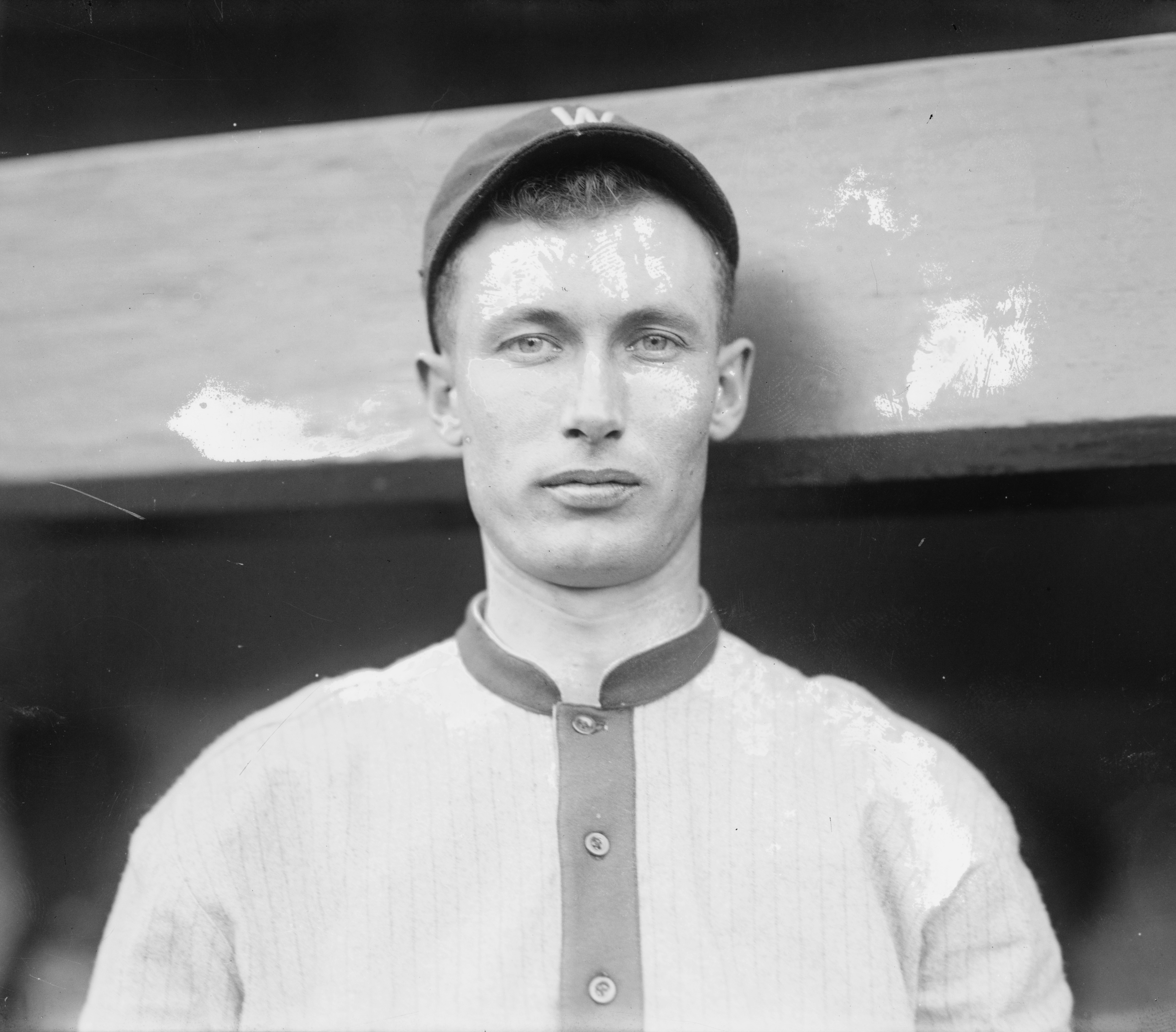
Sam Rice, Washington Senators, 1916

Rice played 19 of his 20 seasons with the Washington Senators. He appeared in only 62 total major league games in 1915 and 1916. He played 155 games in 1917, registering a .302 batting average in 656 plate appearances. Rice was recalled up to the army in 1918. He joined the 68th Coast Artillery Regiment and was stationed at Fort Terry in New York. He appeared with the Senators in a few games during two furloughs. By September, his company was sent to France and they prepared for combat, but the men did not see any action before the signing of the Armistice of 11 November 1918.

In 1919, Rice played in 141 games and hit .321, one of 13 seasons in which he hit at least .300. He hit .338 in 1920, recorded a league-leading and career-high 63 stolen bases and was caught stealing a league-high 30 times. In 1921, he hit 13 triples, the first of ten consecutive seasons in which he finished in double digits in that category. He collected a league-high 216 hits in 1924, which culminated in Rice and the Senators winning the 1924 World Series in a dramatic 7-game series against the New York Giants. Though not the league leader in 1925, Rice recorded a career-high 227 hits, 87 RBI, and a .350 batting average, career highs among his full seasons.

=== The catch ===
The most famous moment in Rice's career came on defense. In Game 3 of the 1925 World Series, the Senators were leading the Pittsburgh Pirates, 4–3. In the middle of the 8th inning, Rice was moved from center field to right field. With two out in the top of the inning, Pirate catcher Earl Smith drove a ball to right-center field. Rice ran the ball down and appeared to catch it at the fence, robbing Smith of a home run that would have tied the game. After the catch, Rice toppled over the fence and into the stands, disappearing from sight. When Rice reappeared, he had the ball in his glove and the umpire called Smith out. The umpire's explanation was that as soon as the catch was made the play was over, so it did not matter where Rice ended up. His team lost the Series in seven games.

Controversy persisted over whether Rice had actually caught the ball and whether he had kept possession of it. Some Pittsburgh fans sent signed and notarized documents claiming that they saw a fan pick up the ball and put it back in Rice's glove. Rice himself would not tell, answering only, "The umpire said I caught it." Magazines offered to pay him for the story, but Rice turned them down, saying, "I don't need the money. The mystery is more fun." He would not even tell his wife or his daughter. The controversy became so great that Rice wrote a letter when he was selected to the Hall of Fame, to be opened upon his death. After Rice's death, a Hall of Fame official located the letter describing his World Series play and delivered it to Rice's family. It was opened and read after his funeral. In an interview, his wife Mary said, "He did catch it. You don't have to worry about that anymore." The letter concluded by stating, "At no time did I lose possession of the ball."

=== Later career ===
Leading the league in hits again in 1926, Rice finished fourth in the Most Valuable Player Award voting. His batting average dipped to .297 in 1927, but he hit .328, .323 and .349 from, respectively, the 1928 through 1930 seasons. Though Rice hit .310 in 1931 across 120 games, Dave Harris got significant playing time when the team was facing lefthanded pitchers. The Senators also began to explore younger players for their outfield spots.

The Senators held "Sam Rice Day" in late 1932, where the team presented him with several gifts, including a check for more than $2,200 and a new Studebaker automobile. He played only 106 games that year, often appearing as a pinch hitter. In 1933, the team returned to the World Series. Though the team lost, Rice batted once in the second game, picking up a pinch hit single. The Senators released him after the season.

He played in 1934 with the Cleveland Indians, then retired at the age of 44. Cleveland manager Walter Johnson talked to Rice about returning in 1935, but Rice refused. Rice retired with a .322 career average. He stood erect at the plate and used quick wrists to slash pitches to all fields. He never swung at the first pitch and seldom struck out, once completing a 616-at-bat season (1929) with nine strikeouts. Rice struck out only 275 times in 9,269 at-bats, or once every 33.71 at-bats, making him the 11th all-time most difficult MLB player to strike out. He recorded six 200-hit seasons in the major leagues. As the ultimate contact man with the picture-perfect swing, Rice was never a home run threat, but his speed often turned singles into doubles, and his 1920 stolen base total of 63 earned him the timely nickname "Man o' War".

With 2,987 hits, Rice has the most hits of any player not to reach 3,000. Rice later said, "The truth of the matter is I did not even know how many hits I had. A couple of years after I quit, [Senators owner] Clark Griffith told me about it, and asked me if I'd care to have a comeback with the Senators and pick up those 13 hits. But I was out of shape, and didn't want to go through all that would have been necessary to make the effort. Nowadays, with radio and television announcers spouting records every time a player comes to bat, I would have known about my hits and probably would have stayed to make 3,000 of them." In postseason play, Rice produced 19 hits and a .302 batting average.

== Career statistics ==
See:Career Statistics for a complete explanation.

G	AB	H	2B	3B	HR	R	RBI	BB	SO	AVG	OBP	SLG	FP
2,404	9,269	2,987	498	184	34	1,514	1,078	708	275	.322	.374	.427	.965

Rice accumulated 7 five-hit games and 52 four-hit games in his career. In the years that Rice played from 1915 to 1934, no major league player had more hits than Rice did.

== Later life ==
By the 1940s, Rice had become a poultry farmer. His farm was located in Olney, Maryland next to that of Harold L. Ickes, the United States Secretary of the Interior. Rice and Ickes employed several workers of Japanese descent who were displaced from the West Coast by order of the U.S. Army after the outbreak of World War II.

Rice was inducted into the Baseball Hall of Fame in 1963. He and three other players – John Clarkson, Elmer Flick and Eppa Rixey – were elected unanimously that year by the Hall of Fame's Veterans Committee, which considered players who had been inactive for 20 or more years. Rice said that he was glad to be inducted and said that he thought he would probably be elected if he survived long enough.

Rice remarried twice, first to Edith and at age 69 to Mary Kendall Adams. Mary had two daughters by a prior marriage, Margaret and Christine. In 1965, Rice and his family were interviewed in advance of a program to honor his career. The interviewer asked Rice about the tornado, and as he told of the storm and its destruction, his wife and children learned for the first time of the existence of his previous family.

Rice made one of his last public appearances at the Baseball Hall of Fame induction ceremonies honoring Whitey Ford and Mickey Mantle in August 1974. He died of cancer that year on October 13. He was buried in Woodside Cemetery in Brinklow, Maryland.

== See also ==
- List of Major League Baseball hit records
- List of Major League Baseball career hits leaders
- List of Major League Baseball career doubles leaders
- List of Major League Baseball career triples leaders
- List of Major League Baseball career runs scored leaders
- List of Major League Baseball career runs batted in leaders
- List of Major League Baseball career stolen bases leaders
- List of Major League Baseball career total bases leaders
- List of Major League Baseball annual stolen base leaders
- List of Major League Baseball annual triples leaders
