= Eddie Moore (baseball) =

American baseball player (1899–1976)

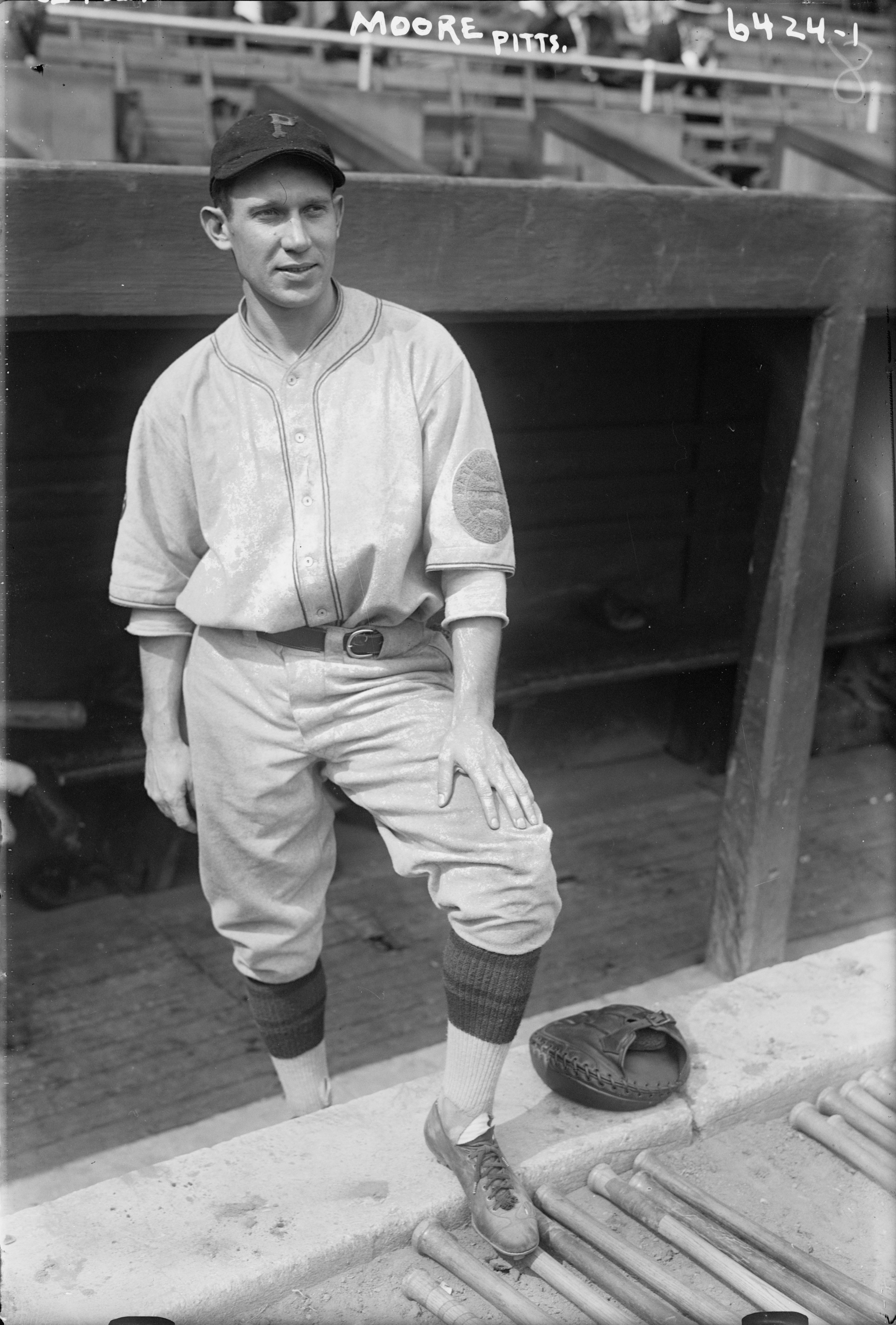
- Moore with the Pittsburgh Pirates in 1925
- Infielder / Outfielder
- Born: January 18, 1899; Barlow, Kentucky, U.S.
- Died: February 10, 1976 (aged 77); Fort Myers, Florida, U.S.
- Batted: Right Threw: Right

MLB debut
- September 25, 1923, for the Pittsburgh Pirates

Last MLB appearance
- July 11, 1934, for the Cleveland Indians

MLB statistics
- Batting average: .285
- Home runs: 13
- Runs batted in: 257
- Stats at Baseball Reference

Teams
- Pittsburgh Pirates (1923–1926); Boston Braves (1926–1928); Brooklyn Robins (1929–1930); New York Giants (1932); Cleveland Indians (1934)

Career highlights and awards
- World Series champion (1925)

Graham Edward Moore (January 18, 1899 – February 10, 1976) was an American professional baseball player who played second base and outfield from 1923 to 1934 in the Major Leagues.

== Baseball career ==
Moore nearly usurped Pie Traynor's job as the starting third baseman for the Pittsburgh Pirates in 1924, his rookie season. Traynor, mired in a terrible slump, was benched on June 18, and Moore batted .423 in his first 13 games at the position. On the strength of this performance, manager Bill McKechnie declared Moore to be his starter going forward. However, Moore was hit by a pitch from Johnny Stuart of the St. Louis Cardinals on July 1, suffering a dislocated shoulder, and Traynor took advantage of Moore's absence to re-solidify his hold on the position.

The next season, after Rabbit Maranville was traded to the Chicago Cubs, Moore became the Pirates' starting second baseman. He injured his shoulder on May 8, but was forced back into the lineup at less than full strength after only a few days of rest because the father of his backup, Johnny Rutledge, had died unexpectedly.

Moore was sold to the Boston Braves in 1926, after a confrontation with Fred Clarke, who was then working as the Pirates' assistant manager and head of scouting. The trouble began during a doubleheader against the New York Giants on July 12. Moore committed an error in the first game, and was booed by the crowd. He had a habit of reflexively smiling during moments of stress, and when Clarke saw his grin, he took it to be a sign that Moore did not care about what he was doing. The two got into a shouting match in the dugout after the end of the inning, with Moore telling Clarke to "get off the bench". That game was Moore's last with the Pirates. That evening, McKechnie fined Moore and pitcher Emil Yde for what he termed "indifferent play", and on July 20 the team sold Moore to the Braves.

On September 27, 1930, Moore became the last major-league player to hit a "bounce" home run. (Prior to the 1931 season, a ball that bounced from the field of play into the outfield stands was considered a home run.)

Moore helped lead the New Orleans Pelicans to a Southern Association championship in 1933, batting .309 as the team's starting shortstop.

in 748 games over 10 seasons in his major league career, Moore posted a .285 batting average (706-for-2474) with 360 runs, 108 doubles, 26 triples, 13 home runs, 257 RBI, 52 stolen bases, 272 bases on balls, .359 on-base percentage and .366 slugging percentage. He finished his career with an overall .953 fielding percentage. In the 1925 World Series, he hit .231 (6-for-26) with 7 runs, 1 double, 1 home run, 2 RBI and 5 walks.
