= Pie Traynor =

American baseball player, broadcaster, and manager (1898–1972)

- Traynor in 1925
- Third baseman
- Born: November 11, 1898; Framingham, Massachusetts, U.S.
- Died: March 16, 1972 (aged 73); Pittsburgh, Pennsylvania, U.S.
- Batted: Right Threw: Right

MLB debut
- September 15, 1920, for the Pittsburgh Pirates

Last MLB appearance
- August 14, 1937, for the Pittsburgh Pirates

MLB statistics
- Batting average: .320
- Hits: 2,416
- Home runs: 58
- Runs batted in: 1,273
- Stats at Baseball Reference
- Managerial record at Baseball Reference

Teams
- As player: Pittsburgh Pirates (1920–1935, 1937); As manager: Pittsburgh Pirates (1934–1939)

Career highlights and awards
- 2× All-Star (1933, 1934); World Series champion (1925); Pittsburgh Pirates No. 20 retired; Pittsburgh Pirates Hall of Fame

Member of the National

Baseball Hall of Fame
- Induction: 1948
- Vote: 76.9% (eighth ballot)

Harold Joseph "Pie" Traynor (November 11, 1898 – March 16, 1972) was an American third baseman, manager, scout and radio broadcaster in Major League Baseball (MLB) who played his entire career between 1920 and 1937 for the Pittsburgh Pirates. Traynor had a .320 career batting average, batting over .300 ten times with seven seasons with over 100 runs batted in (RBI). With home runs limited by playing in Forbes Field, the most difficult park for power hitting in the National League (NL), he compensated by reaching double digits in triples eleven times, leading the league in 1923. He batted .346 in the 1925 World Series to help the Pirates take their first championship in 16 years.

Traynor led NL third basemen in putouts seven times, in double plays four times, and in assists three times; his 41 double plays in 1925 were an NL record until 1950, and his 226 putouts that year remain the highest NL total since 1905. He set major league records for career double plays (303) and games (1,863) at third base which were broken in 1945 and 1960 respectively, and which remained NL records until Eddie Mathews broke them in 1964 and 1965; his 2,289 putouts remain the NL record, and his 3,521 assists were the league record until Mathews passed him in 1964. Traynor was inducted into the Baseball Hall of Fame in 1948, becoming the initial third baseman elected by the Baseball Writers' Association of America.

Following World War II, Traynor was often cited as the greatest third baseman in major league history. In recent years, his renown has diminished, with the modern-era careers of third basemen including Mathews, Brooks Robinson, Mike Schmidt, and George Brett moving to the forefront in the memories of baseball fans; however, he is still widely regarded as the top third baseman in the National League prior to 1950.

== Early life ==
Traynor was born in Framingham, Massachusetts, to parents who had emigrated from Canada. He received his nickname as a child in Somerville, Massachusetts, because he frequented a grocery store and often asked for pie. The store owner called him "Pie Face", which was later shortened to Pie by his friends.

In 1919, he played in what is now the Cape Cod Baseball League (CCBL). Playing for both the Falmouth and Oak Bluffs town teams, he batted .447 for Falmouth and had a combined batting average of .322 for the two teams. In 2009, he was inducted into the CCBL Hall of Fame.

== Playing career ==
Traynor began his professional baseball career in 1920 as a shortstop for the Portsmouth Truckers of the Virginia League. He was asked by a Boston Braves scout to work out with the team at Braves Field, but the scout forgot to tell Braves manager George Stallings. Stallings ran Traynor off the field, telling him not to return.

Traynor made his major league debut with the Pittsburgh Pirates at the age of 21 on September 15, 1920, appearing in 17 games that season. He appeared in 10 games for the Pirates in 1921, but spent the majority of the season playing for the Birmingham Barons. He posted a .336 batting average in 131 games for the Barons, but he committed 64 errors as a shortstop.

Traynor became the Pirates' regular third baseman in 1922, hitting for a .282 batting average with 81 runs batted in (RBI). Following the advice of Rogers Hornsby, he began using a heavier bat in 1923 and blossomed into one of the best hitters in the National League (NL). He hit above .300 for the first time with a .338 batting average along with 12 home runs and 101 runs batted in. With tutoring provided by teammate Rabbit Maranville, his defense also began to improve, leading National League third basemen in putouts and assists.

In 1925, Traynor posted a .320 average with six home runs, 106 runs batted in and led the league in fielding percentage as the Pirates won the NL pennant by 8 1/2 games over the New York Giants. In the 1925 World Series, he hit .346 including a home run off future Hall of Fame pitcher Walter Johnson as the Pirates defeated the Washington Senators in a seven-game series. Traynor ended the season eighth in Most Valuable Player (MVP) Award balloting. His 41 double plays in 1925 set an NL record for third basemen that stood for 25 years.

The Pirates won the pennant again in 1927 with Traynor hitting .342 with five home runs and 106 runs batted in, but they lost to the New York Yankees in the 1927 World Series. In November of that year, members of the Baseball Writers' Association of America selected him as the third baseman for the 1927 all-star major league team. Traynor hit .337 and produced a career-high 124 runs batted in during the 1928 season despite hitting only three home runs and finished in sixth place in the NL MVP Award balloting. He continued to be a cornerstone for the Pirates, posting a .356 batting average in 1929.

Traynor hit for a career-high .366 average in 1930. A different baseball was used in MLB in 1931, and Traynor's batting average decreased to .298. Despite the decline in his average, Traynor supported the use of the new ball, saying that the 1930 ball had caused too large of an advantage for hitters and had led to lopsided games that had ultimately decreased interest in the sport. In 1933 MLB held its inaugural All-Star Game and, Traynor was selected as a reserve player for the NL team.

Traynor's last full season was in 1934 when he hit over .300 for the ninth time in ten seasons, and was named as the starting third baseman for the NL in the 1934 All-Star Game. During the 1934 season, his throwing arm was injured in a play at home plate, and his defense began to suffer as a result. That June, he became the Pirates' manager. After playing in only 55 games in 1935, Traynor was a full-time manager in 1936. He played his final game on August 14, 1937, scoring the game-winning run as a pinch runner in the ninth inning.

== Career statistics ==
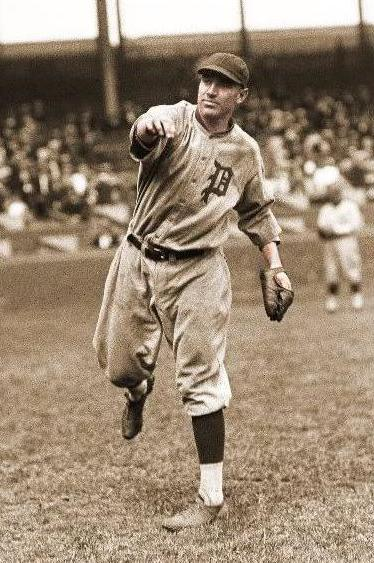
Traynor was regarded as one of the greatest third basemen of his generation.

In a 17-year major league career, Traynor played in 1,941 games, accumulating 2,416 hits in 7,559 at bats for a .320 career batting average along with 58 home runs, 1,273 runs batted in and an on-base percentage of .362. He retired with a .946 fielding percentage. Traynor reached a high of 12 home runs in 1923. He hit more doubles and triples, with 371 doubles and 164 triples lifetime and leading the league in triples in 1923, with 19. He hit over .300 ten times and had over 100 runs batted in (RBI) in a season seven times. Traynor accumulated 6 five-hit games and 39 four-hit games in his MLB career. His seven seasons with more than 100 RBI is tied for second among major league third basemen, behind Mike Schmidt's 9 seasons. He had 208 hits in 1923, the last Pirate infielder with 200 or more hits until shortstop Jack Wilson, who had 201 hits in 2004. Traynor struck out only 278 times in his career.

Traynor was considered the best fielding third baseman of his era, leading the National League in fielding percentage once, double plays four times, assists three times, and putouts seven times. His 2,289 putouts ranks fifth all-time among third basemen. His 1,863 games played at third base was a major league record that stood until 1960 when Eddie Yost surpassed it. Traynor is the only MLB player to steal home plate in an All-Star Game. Traynor finished in the top ten in NL MVP Award voting six times during his career.

== Managing career ==
Traynor became the Pirates' player-manager during the 1934 season. He retired as an active player after the 1937 season, but continued as the Pirates' manager. Traynor almost won another pennant as a manager in 1938, as the Pirates led the NL for most of the season before faltering to the Chicago Cubs in the famous "Homer in the Gloamin'" game at Wrigley Field. The loss of the pennant devastated Traynor. He seemed to lose confidence in his team, and after a sixth-place finish in 1939, he resigned after five seasons as the manager of the Pirates.

== Post-retirement and legacy ==
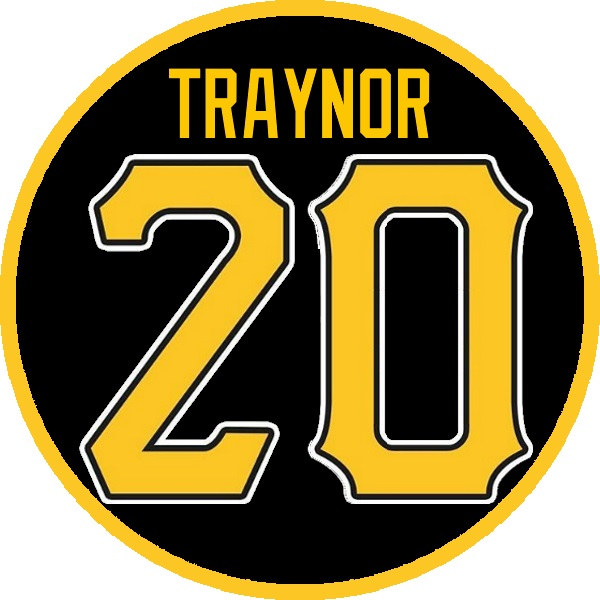
Pie Traynor's number 20 was retired by the Pittsburgh Pirates in 1972.

After spending time as a scout for the Pirates, Traynor eventually took a job as a sports director for Pittsburgh radio station KQV in 1944. His radio broadcasts became popular with Pittsburgh sports fans and he remained at the job for 21 years. Traynor retired from broadcasting in 1965. In 1948, Traynor was selected to the Baseball Hall of Fame, being the first third baseman to be chosen by the Baseball Writers' Association of America. In 1969, as part of the observance of the centennial of professional baseball, Traynor was named the third baseman on MLB's all-time team. In 1971, he threw out the first pitch of Game 3 of the 1971 World Series at Three Rivers Stadium. He died in 1972 in Pittsburgh, not long after the Pirates moved into Three Rivers Stadium. His #20 was retired posthumously at the Pirates home opener on April 18, 1972. Traynor was buried in Homewood Cemetery in Pittsburgh.

In 1999, The Sporting News ranked him 70th on its list of the 100 Greatest Baseball Players, and he was a finalist for the Major League Baseball All-Century Team. Baseball historian Bill James ranked Traynor 15th all-time among third baseman in his New Historical Baseball Abstract in 2001.

The television series The Simpsons made a brief visual reference to Traynor in the 1992 episode "Homer at the Bat." Mr. Burns slotted Traynor to play third base for his nuclear power plant's all-star softball team, but his assistant Smithers points out that all the players he selected have long since retired and died. Traynor was also mentioned by Mr. Burns in the 1990 episode "Dancin' Homer."

The sketch comedy series Second City Television (SCTV) contains a character of a burlesque dancer named "Honey Pie" Traynor, in likely homage to Traynor.

== See also ==
- List of Major League Baseball career hits leaders
- List of Major League Baseball career triples leaders
- List of Major League Baseball career runs scored leaders
- List of Major League Baseball career runs batted in leaders
- List of Major League Baseball annual triples leaders
- List of Major League Baseball player-managers
- List of Major League Baseball players who spent their entire career with one franchise
- List of Major League Baseball players to hit for the cycle

Preceded by Bob Meusel	Hitting for the cycle July 7, 1923	Succeeded by Baby Doll Jacobson
