= Stan Coveleski =

Major League Baseball pitcher (1889–1984)

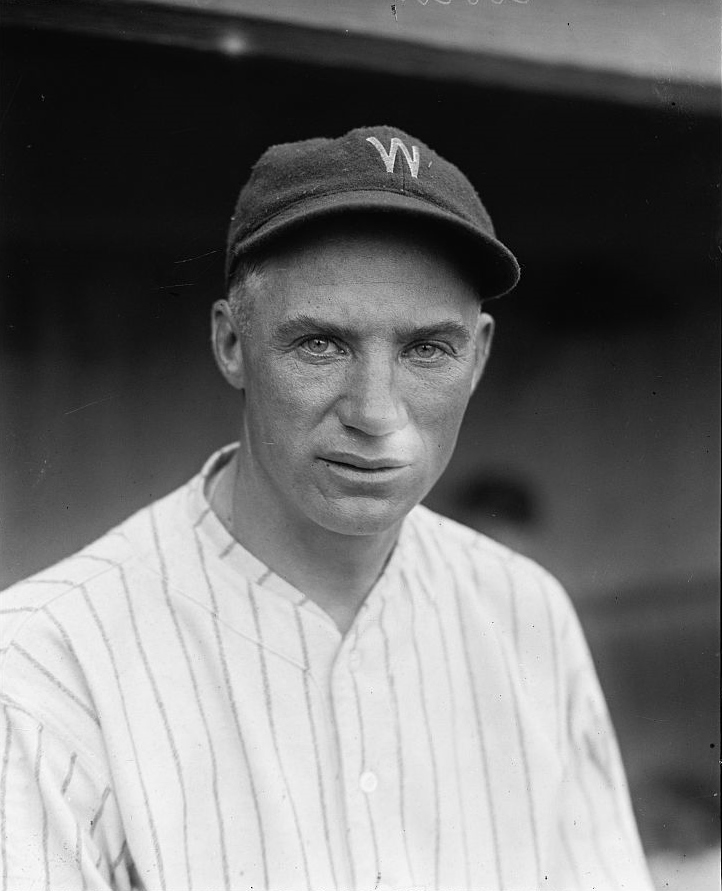
- Coveleski with the Washington Senators in 1925
- Pitcher
- Born: July 13, 1889; Shamokin, Pennsylvania, U.S.
- Died: March 20, 1984 (aged 94); South Bend, Indiana, U.S.
- Batted: Right Threw: Right

MLB debut
- September 10, 1912, for the Philadelphia Athletics

Last MLB appearance
- August 3, 1928, for the New York Yankees

MLB statistics
- Win–loss record: 215–142
- Earned run average: 2.89
- Strikeouts: 981
- Stats at Baseball Reference

Teams
- Philadelphia Athletics (1912); Cleveland Indians (1916–1924); Washington Senators (1925–1927); New York Yankees (1928)

Career highlights and awards
- World Series champion (1920); 2× AL ERA leader (1923, 1925); AL strikeout leader (1920); Cleveland Guardians Hall of Fame

Member of the National

Baseball Hall of Fame
- Induction: 1969
- Election method: Veterans Committee

Stanley Anthony Coveleski (born Stanislaus Kowalewski, July 13, 1889 – March 20, 1984) was an American right-handed pitcher in Major League Baseball who played for four American League (AL) teams between 1912 and 1928, primarily the Cleveland Indians. The star of the Indians pitching staff, he won over 20 games each year from the war-shortened 1918 season through 1921, leading the AL in shutouts twice and in strikeouts and earned run average (ERA) once each during his nine years with the club. The star of the 1920 World Series, he led the Indians to their first title with three complete-game victories, including a 3–0 shutout in the Game 7 finale. Traded to the Washington Senators after the 1924 season, he helped that club to its second AL pennant in a row with 20 victories against only 5 losses, including a 13-game winning streak, while again leading the league in ERA.

Coveleski followed in the footsteps of his brother Harry as a major league pitcher. But after making his debut with the Philadelphia Athletics in 1912, he was sidetracked by three more seasons in the minor leagues before joining the Indians in 1916, and won only 13 major league games before turning 27. Coveleski specialized in throwing the spitball, where the pitcher alters the ball with a foreign substance such as chewing tobacco. It was legal when his career began but prohibited in 1920, with Coveleski being one of 17 pitchers permitted to continue throwing the pitch. In 450 career games, Coveleski pitched 3,082 innings and posted a record of 215–142, with 224 complete games, 38 shutouts, and a 2.89 ERA. He set Cleveland records of 172 wins, 2,502 1/3 innings and 305 starts, which were later broken by Mel Harder and Willis Hudlin. He was inducted into the Baseball Hall of Fame in 1969.

== Early years ==
Stanislaus Anthony Kowalewski was born on July 13, 1889, in Shamokin, Pennsylvania, one of eight children of Anthony and Ann (Racicz) Kowalewski, who had immigrated from Russian Poland in the early 1870s. They settled in Shamokin, where Anthony worked as a coal miner, in Northumberland County, east of the Susquehanna River and northeast of the state capital of Harrisburg. Stanley was the youngest of five baseball-playing brothers; his oldest brother Jacob died serving in the Spanish–American War (1898). In addition to his older brother Harry, who pitched in the major leagues between 1907 and 1918, their other brothers Frank and John also played professional baseball, but only in the minor leagues. Harry won 20 games in a season on three occasions during his 14-year major league career.

Like many his age in the Shamokin area, Coveleski began work as a "breaker boy" at a local colliery at the age of 12. In return for 72 hours of labor per week, Coveleski received $3.75, or about five cents an hour. "There was nothing strange in those days about a twelve-year-old Polish kid working in the mines for 72 hours a week at a nickel an hour", he later recalled. "What was strange is that I ever got out of there". Coveleski was rarely able to play baseball as a child due to his work schedule.

Nevertheless, he worked on his pitching skills during the evenings, when he threw stones at a tin can placed 50 feet away. When he was 18 years old, Coveleski's abilities caught the attention of the local semi-professional ball club, which invited him to pitch for them. "When it came to throwing a baseball, why it was easy to pitch", Coveleski recalled. "After all, the plate's a lot bigger than a tin can to throw at". His baseball career in Shamokin was short-lived; after five games, Coveleski relocated to Lancaster, Pennsylvania.

== Philadelphia Athletics and minor leagues ==
Coveleski signed his first professional contract in 1909 with the minor league Lancaster Red Roses, a club affiliated with the Tri-State League. Originally reluctant to sign for the club, he only agreed to do so if his older brother John also joined; at that time he anglicized his name, changing it to Coveleskie, which it would remain throughout his professional career. During his first trip to Lancaster, he recalled that it was "the first time I ever rode on a train", and he added that he "was too shy to eat in the hotel with the rest of the team". In 272 innings of work his first season, Coveleski had a 23–11 win–loss record with an earned run average of 1.95. He pitched two more seasons for Lancaster, earning a record of 53–38 in 109 appearances through three seasons.

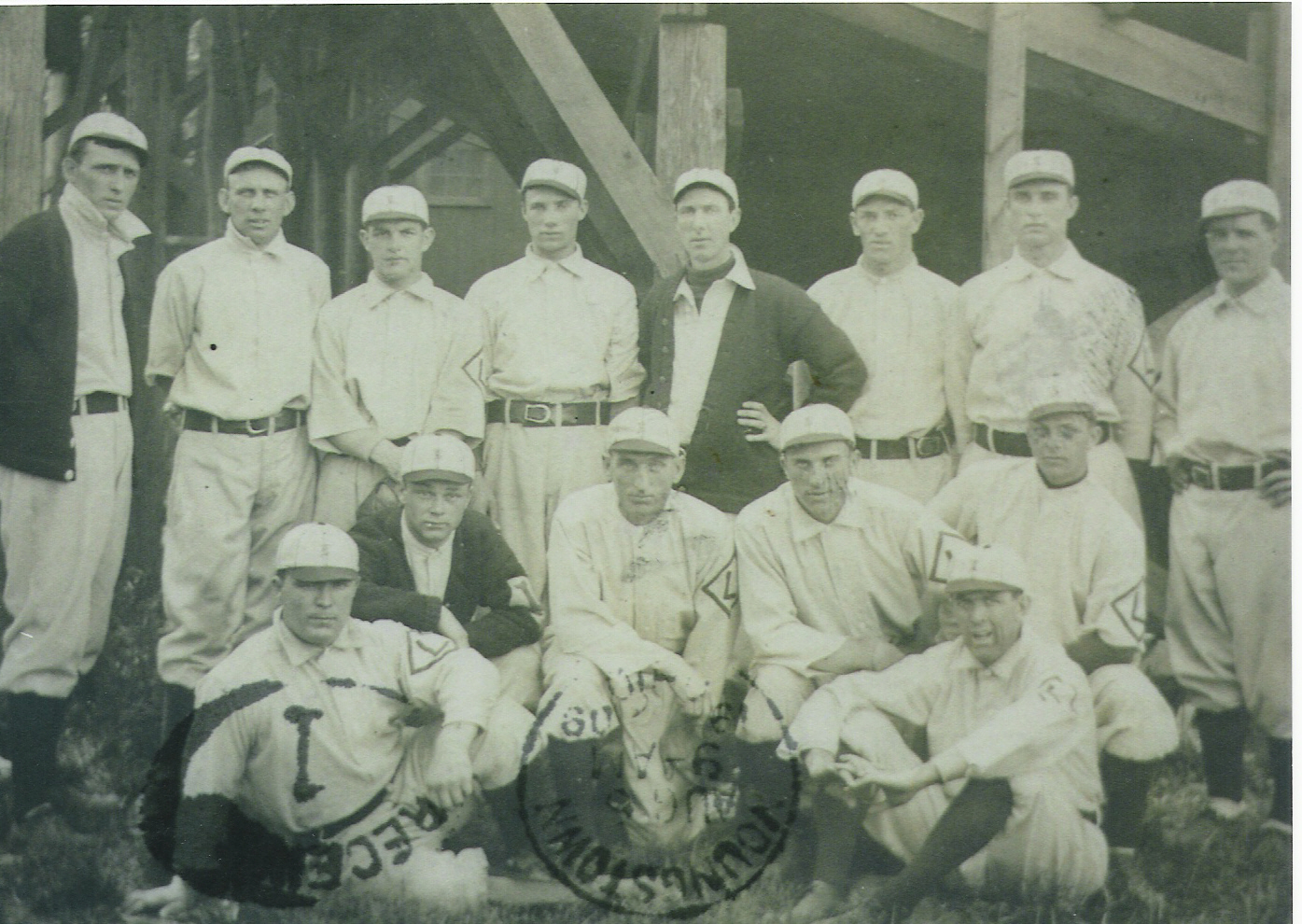
1909 Lancaster Red Roses; Stan Coveleski is standing fourth from left

In 1912, he pitched for the relocated Lancaster team, the Atlantic City Lanks, where he had a 20–14 record with a 2.53 ERA in 40 appearances, 30 of them starts. In September 1912, manager Connie Mack signed him to a contract with the Philadelphia Athletics and brought him to the major leagues. By the time Coveleski made his debut for the Athletics on September 10, pitching one inning in relief in an 8–6 road loss to the Detroit Tigers, the two-time defending World Series champions were more than a dozen games out of first place – the only year between 1910 and 1914 they failed to win the pennant. Coveleski won his first game two days later in his first start, a 3–0 three-hit shutout of the Tigers, allowing only two singles and a double by Ty Cobb. He pitched in five games for the Athletics that season, starting two of them and finishing the season with a 2–1 record and a 3.43 ERA. After the season ended, Mack felt that Coveleski needed more seasoning, and sent him to the Spokane Indians of the Northwestern League. Coveleski finished the 1913 season with a 17–20 record and a 2.82 ERA. Around that time, he married Mary Stivetts, and the following season he went 20–15, pitched over 300 innings, and led the league in strikeouts.

At the time of his debut, the powerhouse Philadelphia club boasted a strong group of talented pitchers, including Eddie Plank, Chief Bender, and Jack Coombs. Coveleski admitted that he "[didn't] know if I could have beat them out for a spot in the rotation." After the 1914 season, the Portland Beavers of the Pacific Coast League wanted Coveleski, and traded five players to Spokane to acquire him. While Mack had an agreement with Spokane that Coveleski would be promoted after playing there for a time, the Athletics fell under new ownership in 1913 and lost control of him due to the Athletics' rights expiring. Coveleski spent his time in Portland learning to throw the spitball; originally using chewing tobacco, he later used alum. In his lone season with Portland, he won and lost 17 games, and had a 2.67 ERA. After the season ended, the Cleveland Indians purchased Coveleski from Portland, and he joined the major league squad in 1916.

== Cleveland Indians ==
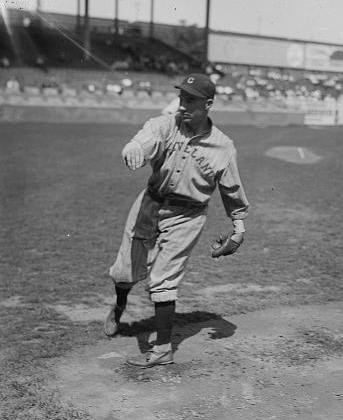
Stan Coveleski with Cleveland in 1918

When Coveleski was brought up to the majors, the original intention was to use him as a relief pitcher. Due to an injury to Ed Klepfer, the Indians used him as a starter early on in the 1916 season, and kept him in the role when he performed well. He was scheduled to pitch in the first week of the season against his brother Harry, but the matchup never took place at Harry's behest. On May 30, Coveleski hit the only home run of his career in the first game of a road doubleheader against the St. Louis Browns; the three-run shot in the tenth inning gave Cleveland a 4–1 lead, but the Browns came back to win 5–4 in 15 innings. Coveleski fought health problems during the season, suffering from tonsillitis in the middle of the year and pitching one game with a fever of 102 °F (39 °C). He finished the season with a 15–13 record and a 3.41 ERA in 45 games, 27 of them starts. Coveleski had lost 10 pounds due to illness during 1916, but recovered during the offseason, gained 20 pounds, and appeared healthier by the time the season began.

Coveleski's status as the ace of the staff was demonstrated when he was named the starter for Opening Day of the 1917 season; he beat the Detroit Tigers 6–4 on April 11. He improved statistically during the 1917 season, winning 19 games and losing 14 with an ERA of 1.81 and a career-high 133 strikeouts. On September 19, Coveleski pitched the only one-hitter of his career, a 2–0 road win over the New York Yankees; the only hit came from Fritz Maisel in the seventh inning. Coveleski continued to improve during the 1918 season, which was ended on September 2 due to a preseason agreement among owners to shortened season due to World War I. His outings that year included 2–1 13-inning road loss to Philadelphia on May 15, in which he had a career-high ten strikeouts, and a 19-inning complete game on May 24 in New York as the Indians won 3–2. He finished the season with a 22–13 record, a 1.82 ERA, and 311 innings pitched in 38 games, 33 of them starts; his wins and ERA were both second in the American League to Walter Johnson. In 1919, Coveleski pitched in 43 games, starting 34, and had a 24–12 record and an ERA of 2.61.

At the beginning of the 1920 season, the spitball was banned by Major League Baseball. As a current spitball pitcher, Coveleski was grandfathered in, and was allowed to continue using the pitch until his retirement. He won his first seven starting appearances of the season, but on May 28 his wife died suddenly, and he was given some time off to mourn, returning to pitching two weeks later. He picked up his 100th victory on August 2 with a 2–0 shutout win over the Senators. Covaleski was the starting pitcher against the Yankees on August 16, and hit a sacrifice fly to help the Indians win 4–3, but it is best remembered as the game in which a pitch by the Yankees' Carl Mays hit Indians shortstop Ray Chapman in the head, resulting in the only death in major league history. Covaleski finished the 1920 regular season with 24 wins, 14 losses, a 2.49 ERA, and 133 strikeouts; he led the AL in strikeouts and finished second in ERA to Bob Shawkey.

Coveleski helped the Indians to win the AL pennant and play in the 1920 World Series against the Brooklyn Robins. Coveleski was the star of the Series, in which he pitched three complete game victories. He pitched the first game against Rube Marquard, and allowed one run and five hits in a 3–1 Cleveland victory. Four days later, he pitched Game 4, again allowing one run and five hits in a 5–1 win. In Game 7, the final one of the best-of-nine series, Coveleski threw a complete-game shutout with five hits against fellow spitballer Burleigh Grimes; the 3–0 victory gave the Indians the first World Series championship in franchise history. Coveleski had an ERA of 0.67, which remains a World Series record.

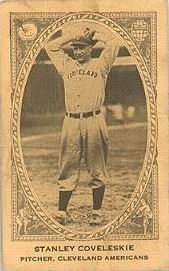
Baseball card of Coveleski with his original spelling, Coveleskie

After spending the offseason hunting with Smoky Joe Wood, Coveleski returned to the Indians in 1921, and throughout the season, the Indians battled the Yankees for first in the American League. On September 26, the two teams faced off, but Coveleski failed to make it past the third inning; the Yankees won 8–7 to ensure they won the pennant. Coveleski pitched 315 innings in 1921, matching his career high from the year before, and had a 23–13 record and a 3.37 ERA. The following season, Coveleski married Frances Stivetts, the sister of his late wife. While he did cause the Yankees to move out of first place after winning an August 23 game against them, 4–1, it was his last game of the season. He finished the year with a 17–14 record, the first time since 1917 he did not have 20 wins, and a 3.32 ERA.

Early on in the 1923 season, Coveleski pitched 27 straight scoreless innings between April 22 and 30, starting with a 10-inning 1–0 shutout of the Tigers and ending when he allowed two runs in the ninth inning of a 4–2 road win over the same club. However, he won less frequently as the season wore on, losing three straight games in mid-August. His last game came on August 15, with over a month left in the season. Coveleski finished the season with a 13–14 record, his first season with a losing record. Despite that, he had an ERA of 2.76 and five shutouts, both of which led the AL. In 1924, Coveleski struggled, and at the end of May, he had four losses and an ERA of 6.49. On June 16 he broke Addie Joss' club record of 160 wins with a 2–1 complete-game win over the Yankees, with the winning run scoring with two out in the bottom of the ninth on second baseman Ernie Johnson's error, with Coveleski batting; he had tied Joss' record two days earlier with a relief win in an 11-inning victory over the Boston Red Sox. In his last appearance on September 22, he gave up a career-high ten runs in a 10–4 loss to the Yankees, ending the season with a 15–16 record and a 4.04 ERA. In December 1924, after nine years pitching for Cleveland, Coveleski was traded to the Washington Senators for pitcher By Speece and outfielder Carr Smith.

Despite Coveleski's success in Cleveland, he was not a fan of playing there; he stated that he "didn't like the town. Now the people are all right, but I just didn't like the town." He also stated that it began to affect his performance on the mound and that he began to get "lazy" from being with the club so long. He did, however, have praise for his catcher: "The best thing that happened to me there was pitching to Steve O'Neill. He caught me for nine years in Cleveland and knew me so well he didn't even need to give me a sign".

== Washington Senators and New York Yankees ==
Due to the acquisition of Coveleski, combined with winning the 1924 World Series, the Washington Senators were considered favorites to win the AL in 1925. During his first season in Washington, Coveleski bounced back from his 1924 season, and by mid-July, critics regarded his success as the biggest surprise in baseball; Cleveland had considered him to be past his best. From May 9 to July 26 he compiled thirteen consecutive victories, ten of them complete games. He won twenty games and lost five that year, and his ERA of 2.84 led the AL. Coveleski also finished 12th in MVP voting that year, with Senators shortstop Roger Peckinpaugh winning the award. The Senators won the AL and were to face the Pittsburgh Pirates in the 1925 World Series, but Coveleski suffered from sore back muscles late in the season. Coveleski pitched two games in the World Series. In Game 2, he faced Vic Aldridge in a pitcher's duel; the teams were tied at one apiece in the eighth inning, but a two-run home run by the Pirates' Kiki Cuyler led to a 3–2 loss. Aldridge and Coveleski faced off again in Game 5, but Coveleski allowed four runs before being pulled with one out in the seventh inning, leading to a 6–3 Pirates win. The Senators lost the series in seven games, and he finished with a 3.77 ERA, five walks, three strikeouts, and two of the Senators' four losses.

Coveleski continued to pitch for Washington during the 1926 season. His performances that season included his 200th win, a 5–3 win in Cleveland on June 10, and a 2–0 victory against the Boston Red Sox on August 31, a game which was finished in only 78 minutes. Coveleski finished the season with 14 wins, 11 losses, 3 shutouts, and a 3.12 ERA in 36 games. To start the 1927 season, due to an injury to Walter Johnson, Coveleski became the Senators' Opening Day starter against the Red Sox; he won the game 6–2. However, his performance declined due to "a chronically sore arm", which limited his playing time that season. Due to his sore arm, the Senators released him unconditionally on June 17, 1927. He finished the season with a 2–1 record and a 3.14 ERA in five games.

On December 21, 1927, Coveleski signed with the New York Yankees in an attempt at a comeback. In his final season, he posted a 5–1 record with a 5.74 ERA in 12 appearances. Coveleski failed to regain his form, however, pitching his last game on August 3, and after the signing of Tom Zachary, manager Miller Huggins released Coveleski. He retired from the game later that year.

== Later life and legacy ==
In 1929, after leaving major league baseball, Coveleski relocated to South Bend, Indiana. There, he ran Coveleski Service Station for a time but closed the business during the Great Depression. He became a popular member of the community in South Bend, providing free pitching lessons to local youths in a field behind his garage. After his playing career ended, he dropped the "e" at the end of his name, as he never corrected anyone if his last name was incorrectly spelled. In 1969, Coveleski was named to the Baseball Hall of Fame by the Veterans' Committee alongside 1920s pitcher Waite Hoyt. Of his introduction into the Hall, he said, "I figured I'd make it sooner or later, and I just kept hoping each year would be the one." His health declined in later years, and he was eventually admitted to a local nursing home, where he died on March 20, 1984, at the age of 94.

In addition to Coveleski's induction into the Baseball Hall of Fame, he was inducted into the National Polish-American Sports Hall of Fame in 1976. In 1984, the minor league baseball stadium in South Bend, Indiana, was named in his honor. Coveleski was interviewed by Lawrence Ritter for his 1966 book The Glory of Their Times, a series of interviews with players of the early 20th century. To fellow ballplayers, Coveleski was considered "taciturn and ornery" on days when he was scheduled to pitch but was otherwise friendly with a lively sense of humor.

Coveleski had 215 wins and 142 losses with a 2.89 ERA in 450 games, 385 of them starts, in a 14-year career. He had 224 complete games, 38 shutouts, 981 strikeouts, and pitched 3,082 total innings. His control was highly regarded. He never considered himself a strikeout pitcher, and it was not unusual for him to pitch a complete game having thrown 95 pitches or fewer. He once pitched seven innings of a game where every pitch was either a hit or a strike. In 2001, baseball writer Bill James ranked Coveleski 58th among the all-time greatest major league pitchers.

== See also ==
- List of Major League Baseball annual ERA leaders
- List of Major League Baseball career wins leaders
- List of Major League Baseball annual strikeout leaders
