= 1925 World Series =

1925 Major League Baseball championship series

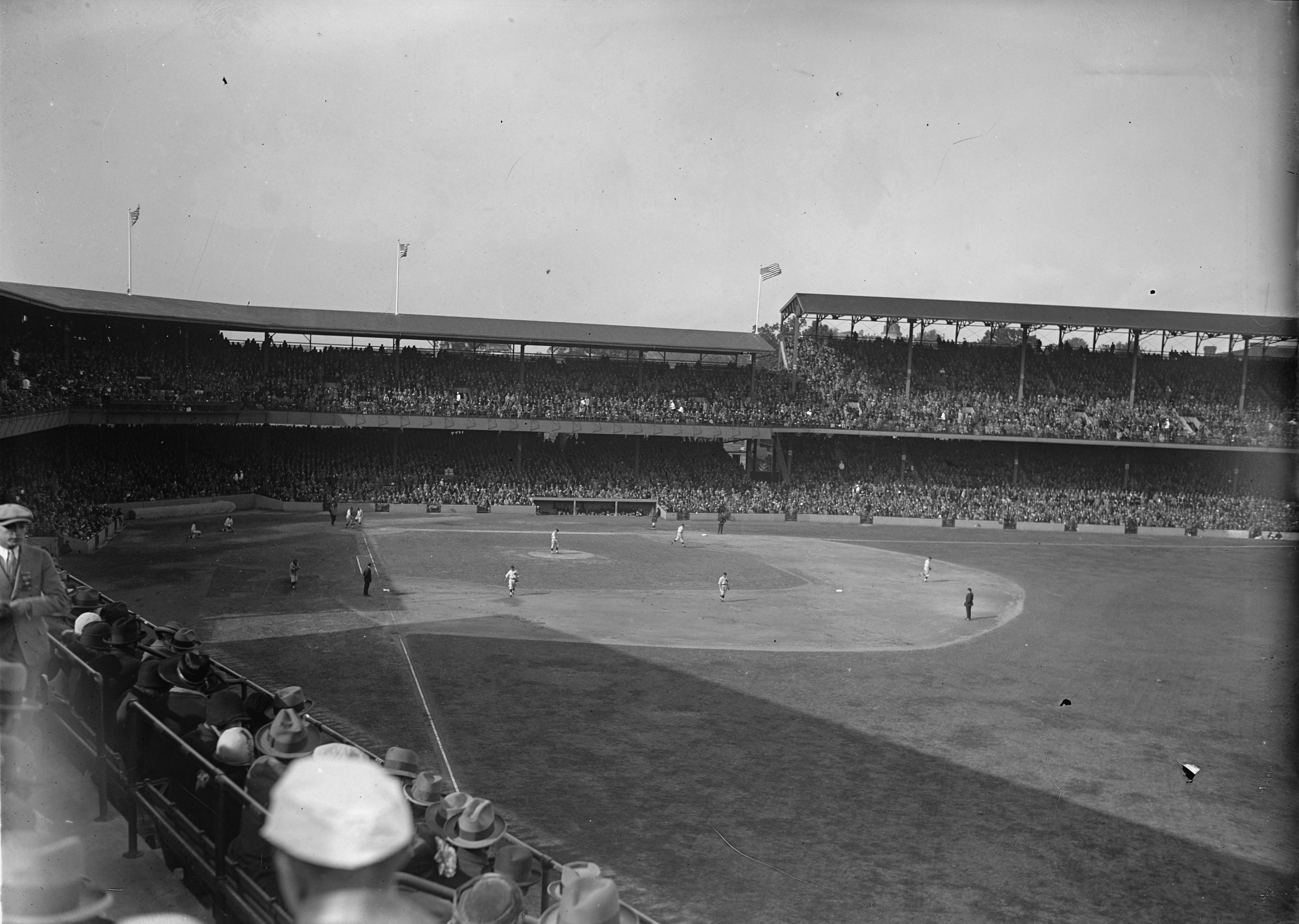
- Griffith Stadium during the series
Team (Wins)	Managers	Season
Pittsburgh Pirates (4)	Bill McKechnie	95–58, .621, GA: 8 1/2
Washington Senators (3)	Bucky Harris (player/manager)	96–55, .636, GA: 8 1/2
- Dates: October 7–15
- Venue(s): Forbes Field (Pittsburgh); Griffith Stadium (Washington)
- Umpires: Cy Rigler (NL), Brick Owens (AL), Barry McCormick (NL), George Moriarty (AL)
- Hall of Famers: Pirates: Bill McKechnie (manager); Max Carey; Kiki Cuyler; Pie Traynor; Senators: Stan Coveleski; Goose Goslin; Bucky Harris (2B/manager); Walter Johnson; Sam Rice

Broadcast
- Radio: Westinghouse
- Radio announcers: Graham McNamee and Quin Ryan

The 1925 World Series was the championship series of the 1925 Major League Baseball season. The 22nd edition of the World Series, it was a best-of-seven playoff, played between the National League (NL) champion Pittsburgh Pirates and the American League (AL) champion Washington Senators, the defending World Series champion. The Pirates defeated the defending champion Senators in seven games to win the series, becoming the first team in North American sports history to overcome a 3–1 series deficit to win a playoff series.

In a reversal of fortune on all counts from the previous 1924 World Series, when Washington's Walter Johnson had come back from two losses to win the seventh and deciding game, Johnson dominated in Games 1 and 4, but lost Game 7.

The Senators built up a 3–1 Series lead. After Pittsburgh won the next two games, Johnson again took the mound for Game 7, and carried a 6–4 lead into the bottom of the seventh inning. But errors by shortstop Roger Peckinpaugh in both the seventh and eighth innings led to four unearned runs, and the Pirates become the first team in a best-of-seven Series to overcome a 3–1 Series deficit to win the championship. Peckinpaugh, the Senators' regular shortstop and the 1925 American League Most Valuable Player, had a tough Series in the field, committing a record eight errors.

Playing conditions were of no help. The 1925 Series was postponed twice due to poor weather, and Game 7 was played in what soon became a steady downpour, described as "probably the worst conditions ever for a World Series game." Senators outfielder Goose Goslin reported that the fog prevented him from clearly seeing the infield during the last three innings of the game, and claimed that the Series-winning hit was actually a foul ball. In the next day's The New York Times, James Harrison wrote "In a grave of mud was buried Walter Johnson's ambition to join the select panel of pitchers who have won three victories in one World Series. With mud shackling his ankles and water running down his neck, the grand old man of baseball succumbed to weariness, a sore leg, wretched support and the most miserable weather conditions that ever confronted a pitcher."

Twice in Game 7 the visiting Senators held leads of at least three runs over the Pirates but failed to hold them. In fact, after the top of the first inning, Washington led 4–0. Nevertheless, Pittsburgh eventually won the game, scoring three runs in the bottom of the eighth inning to turn a 6–7 deficit into a 9–7 lead. To date, the four-run deficit is the largest ever overcome in the seventh game of the World Series. It was the largest comeback in a World Series clinching game until 2024.

A memorable play occurred during the eighth inning of Game 3. The Senators' Sam Rice ran after an Earl Smith line drive hit into right center field. Rice made a diving "catch" into the temporary stands, but did not emerge with the ball for approximately 15 seconds. The Pirates contested the play, saying a fan probably stuffed the ball into Rice's glove. The call stood and Rice parried questions about the incident for the rest of his life—never explicitly saying whether he had or had not really made the catch. His typical answer (including to Commissioner Landis, who said it was a good answer) was always "The umpire said I caught it." Rice left a sealed letter at the Hall of Fame to be opened after his death. In it, he had written: "At no time did I lose possession of the ball."

Writer Lamont Buchanan wrote, "In 1925, the Senators hopped the Big Train once too often... earning Bucky [Harris] the criticism of many fans and American League head [Ban] Johnson who dispatched an irate wire to the Senators manager." In his telegram, Ban Johnson accused the manager of failing to relieve Walter Johnson "for sentimental reasons." Despite the second-guessing, Harris always said, 'If I had it to do over again, I'd still pitch Johnson.'"

This was Walter Johnson's second and final World Series appearance. By the time the original Washington Senators next reached the Fall Classic in 1933 – their last before they became the Minnesota Twins, and the city's last until the 2019 Nationals – Johnson had retired.

== Summary ==
NL Pittsburgh Pirates (4) vs. AL Washington Senators (3)

Game	Date	Score	Location	Time	Attendance
1	October 7	Washington Senators – 4, Pittsburgh Pirates – 1	Forbes Field	1:57	41,723
2	October 8	Washington Senators – 2, Pittsburgh Pirates – 3	Forbes Field	2:04	43,364
3	October 10	Pittsburgh Pirates – 3, Washington Senators – 4	Griffith Stadium	2:10	36,495
4	October 11	Pittsburgh Pirates – 0, Washington Senators – 4	Griffith Stadium	2:00	38,701
5	October 12	Pittsburgh Pirates – 6, Washington Senators – 3	Griffith Stadium	2:26	35,899
6	October 13	Washington Senators – 2, Pittsburgh Pirates – 3	Forbes Field	1:57	43,810
7	October 15	Washington Senators – 7, Pittsburgh Pirates – 9	Forbes Field	2:31	42,856

== Matchups ==
=== Game 1 ===
October 7, 1925 2:00 pm (ET) at Forbes Field in Pittsburgh, Pennsylvania
Team	1	2	3	4	5	6	7	8	9	R	H	E
Washington	0	1	0	0	2	0	0	0	1	4	8	1
Pittsburgh	0	0	0	0	1	0	0	0	0	1	5	0
WP: Walter Johnson (1–0) LP: Lee Meadows (0–1); Home runs: WSH: Joe Harris (1); PIT: Pie Traynor (1)

This game remains to date the last road World Series game the Washington Senators/Minnesota Twins franchise has won. They have lost their last 14 since. Walter Johnson pitched a complete game and allowed only five hits and struck out ten. The Senators got on the board in the second on Joe Harris's home run off Lee Meadows. In the fifth, they loaded the bases on three singles with no outs, but after Meadows struck out the next two batters, a two-run single by Sam Rice made it 3–0 Senators. Pie Traynor's leadoff home run in the bottom half gave the Pirates their only run in the game. The Senators added another run in the ninth off Johnny Morrison when Goose Goslin hit a leadoff single, moved to second on a sacrifice bunt and scored on Ossie Bluege's single.

=== Game 2 ===
October 8, 1925 2:00 pm (ET) at Forbes Field in Pittsburgh, Pennsylvania
Team	1	2	3	4	5	6	7	8	9	R	H	E
Washington	0	1	0	0	0	0	0	0	1	2	8	2
Pittsburgh	0	0	0	1	0	0	0	2	X	3	7	0
WP: Vic Aldridge (1–0) LP: Stan Coveleski (0–1); Home runs: WSH: Joe Judge (1); PIT: Glenn Wright (1), Kiki Cuyler (1)

In Game 2, Joe Judge's second inning home run off Vic Aldridge gave the Senators a 1–0 lead, but the Pirates tied the game in the fourth on Glenn Wright's home run in the fourth off Stan Coveleski. In the eighth, Kiki Cuyler's two-run home run following a Roger Peckinpaugh error that let Eddie Moore reach first put the Pirates up 3–1. In the ninth, the Senators loaded the bases with no outs on two walks and a single, but scored only once on Bobby Veach's sacrifice fly as Aldridge retired the next two batters and the Pirates tied the series heading to Washington.

=== Game 3 ===
October 10, 1925 2:00 pm (ET) at Griffith Stadium in Washington, D.C.
Team	1	2	3	4	5	6	7	8	9	R	H	E
Pittsburgh	0	1	0	1	0	1	0	0	0	3	8	2
Washington	0	0	1	0	0	1	2	0	X	4	10	1
WP: Alex Ferguson (1–0) LP: Ray Kremer (0–1) Sv: Firpo Marberry (1); Home runs: PIT: None; WSH: Goose Goslin (1)

In Game 3, the Pirates struck first in the second when Pie Traynor hit a leadoff triple off Alex Ferguson and scored on Glenn Wright's sacrifice fly, but the Senators tied the game in the third off Ray Kremer when Sam Rice hit a leadoff single and scored on Joe Judge's double. The Pirates regained the lead in the fourth when Kiki Cuyler hit a leadoff single and scored on Clyde Barnhart's double. They added to their lead in the sixth on Kremer's RBI single with two on, but Goose Goslin's home run in the bottom half cut their lead back to one. Next inning, the Senators loaded the bases on a walk and two singles with one out before Judge's sacrifice fly tied the game, then an RBI single by Joe Harris put them up 4–3. A key play occurred in the eighth inning when Earl Smith's line drive into right-center field was caught by Sam Rice who fell into the temporary stands (see overview above). Firpo Marberry pitched two shutout innings to close the game.

=== Game 4 ===
October 11, 1925 2:00 pm (ET) at Griffith Stadium in Washington, D.C.
Team	1	2	3	4	5	6	7	8	9	R	H	E
Pittsburgh	0	0	0	0	0	0	0	0	0	0	6	1
Washington	0	0	4	0	0	0	0	0	X	4	12	0
WP: Walter Johnson (2–0) LP: Emil Yde (0–1); Home runs: PIT: None; WSH: Goose Goslin (2), Joe Harris (2)

This was Johnson's only post-season shutout. A three-run home run by Goose Goslin followed by a solo home run by Joe Harris off Emil Yde, who pitched just 2 1/3 innings, in the third inning put the Senators up 3–1 in the series. Yde became the first pitcher in the history of the World Series to surrender back-to-back home runs.

=== Game 5 ===
October 12, 1925 2:00 pm (ET) at Griffith Stadium in Washington, D.C.
Team	1	2	3	4	5	6	7	8	9	R	H	E
Pittsburgh	0	0	2	0	0	0	2	1	1	6	13	0
Washington	1	0	0	1	0	0	1	0	0	3	8	1
WP: Vic Aldridge (2–0) LP: Stan Coveleski (0–2); Home runs: PIT: None; WSH: Joe Harris (3)

The Pirates loaded the bases in the first, but failed to score. In the bottom half, Sam Rice hit a leadoff single and scored on Goose Goslin's double. In the third, after two walks, Clyde Barnhart's RBI single tied the game, then Pie Traynor's sacrifice fly put the Pirates up 2–1. Joe Harris's home run in the fourth tied the game. After a walk and single, back-to-back RBI singles by Kiki Cuyler and Clyde Barnhart in the seventh put the Pirates up 4–2 and knock Stan Coveleski out of the game. The Senators cut the lead to 4–3 in the bottom half when Nemo Leibold hit a leadoff double and scored on Sam Rice's single, but the Pirates got the run back in the eighth when Glenn Wright hit a leadoff double off Tom Zachary and scored on Stuffy McInnis's single. They added another run in the ninth on Wright's RBI single off Firpo Marberry with the run charged to Zachary. Vic Aldridge retired the Senators in order in the bottom half as the Pirates' 6–3 win forced a Game 6 in Pittsburgh.

=== Game 6 ===
October 13, 1925 2:00 pm (ET) at Forbes Field in Pittsburgh, Pennsylvania
Team	1	2	3	4	5	6	7	8	9	R	H	E
Washington	1	1	0	0	0	0	0	0	0	2	6	2
Pittsburgh	0	0	2	0	1	0	0	0	X	3	7	1
WP: Ray Kremer (1–1) LP: Alex Ferguson (1–1); Home runs: WSH: Goose Goslin (3); PIT: Eddie Moore (1)

The Senators struck first on Goose Goslin's home run in the first, then added another run in the second on Roger Peckinpaugh's RBI double, but Pirates' Ray Kremer would shut them out afterward. In the third, with runners on second and third, Clyde Barnhart's groundout and Pie Traynor's single scored a run each to tie the game. Eddie Moore's fifth inning home run put the Pirates up 3–2. Their lead held, forcing a Game 7.

=== Game 7 ===
October 15, 1925 2:00 pm (ET) at Forbes Field in Pittsburgh, Pennsylvania
Team	1	2	3	4	5	6	7	8	9	R	H	E
Washington	4	0	0	2	0	0	0	1	0	7	7	2
Pittsburgh	0	0	3	0	1	0	2	3	X	9	15	3
WP: Ray Kremer (2–1) LP: Walter Johnson (2–1) Sv: Red Oldham (1); Home runs: WSH: Roger Peckinpaugh (1); PIT: None

The Senators loaded the bases in the first on a single and two walks with one out. A walk to Joe Judge and RBI single by Ossie Bluege put them up 2–0 and knocked starter Vic Aldridge out of the game. Johnny Morrison came in relief, but a catcher interference call and error allowed two more runs to score. In the third, a leadoff single by Morrison, then RBI hits by Eddie Moore, Max Carey and Clyde Barnhart cut the Senators' lead to 4–3. In the fourth, Joe Harris's two-run double extended Washington's lead to 6–3. Back-to-back doubles by Carey and Kiki Cuyler in the fifth cut the lead to 6–4, then in the seventh, Moore reached first on an error before Carey's RBI double and Traynor's RBI triple tied the game. Roger Peckinpaugh's home run in the eighth off Ray Kremer put the Senators back atop 7–6, but in the bottom half, back-to-back two-out doubles by Earl Smith and Carson Bigbee tied the game. A walk and fielder's choice loaded the bases before Cuyler's two-run double put the Pirates atop 9–7. Red Oldham retired the Senators in order in the ninth to end the series. The Pirates hit Walter Johnson hard for 15 hits in a 9–7 comeback win in rainy, wet and muddy conditions. The Pirates were the first team to come back from a 3–1 deficit in a seven-game series.

== Composite line score ==
1925 World Series (4–3): Pittsburgh Pirates (N.L.) defeat Washington Senators (A.L.)

Team	1	2	3	4	5	6	7	8	9	R	H	E
Pittsburgh Pirates	0	1	7	2	3	1	4	6	1	25	61	7
Washington Senators	6	3	5	3	2	1	3	1	2	26	59	9
Total attendance: 282,848 Average attendance: 40,407; Winning player's share: $5,333 Losing player's share: $3,735

== Aftermath ==
The Pirates returned to the World Series two years later in hopes of adding another championship, but were swept by the New York Yankees. They would not win the title again until 1960, in which they defeated the Yankees in seven games in a rematch.

The Senators would make one more World Series in 1933, which they lost to the New York Giants in five games, which would be their last during their time in the nation’s capital, as the team would move to Minneapolis in 1961 to become the Minnesota Twins.

== See also ==
- 1925 Negro World Series
