= Earl Smith (catcher) =

American baseball player (1897–1963)

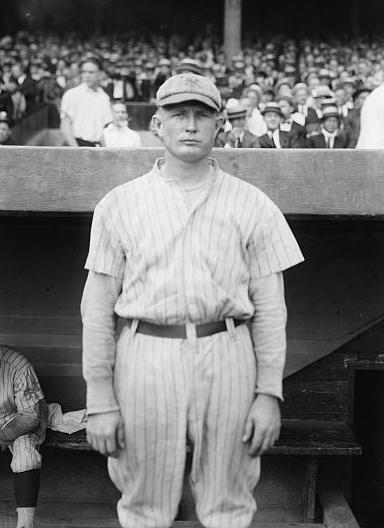
- Catcher
- Born: February 14, 1897; Sheridan, Arkansas, U.S.
- Died: June 8, 1963 (aged 66); Little Rock, Arkansas, U.S.
- Batted: Left Threw: Right

MLB debut
- April 24, 1919, for the New York Giants

Last MLB appearance
- September 28, 1930, for the St. Louis Cardinals

MLB statistics
- Batting average: .303
- Home runs: 46
- Runs batted in: 355
- Stats at Baseball Reference

Teams
- New York Giants (1919–1923); Boston Braves (1923–1924); Pittsburgh Pirates (1924–1928); St. Louis Cardinals (1928–1930)

Career highlights and awards
- 3× World Series champion (1921, 1922, 1925)

Earl Sutton Smith (February 14, 1897 – June 8, 1963) was an American professional baseball player. He played as a catcher in Major League Baseball from 1919 to 1930. He would play for the New York Giants, Boston Braves, Pittsburgh Pirates, and St. Louis Cardinals.

In 860 games over 12 seasons, Smith posted a .303 batting average (686-for-2264) with 225 runs, 115 doubles, 19 triples, 46 home runs, 355 RBI, 247 bases on balls, .374 on-base percentage and .432 slugging percentage. He finished his career with a .971 fielding percentage. In five World Series over 17 games (1921,'22,'25,'27 and '28) Smith batted .239 (11-for-46) with no runs or RBI.
