= Walter Johnson =

American baseball player and manager (1887–1946)

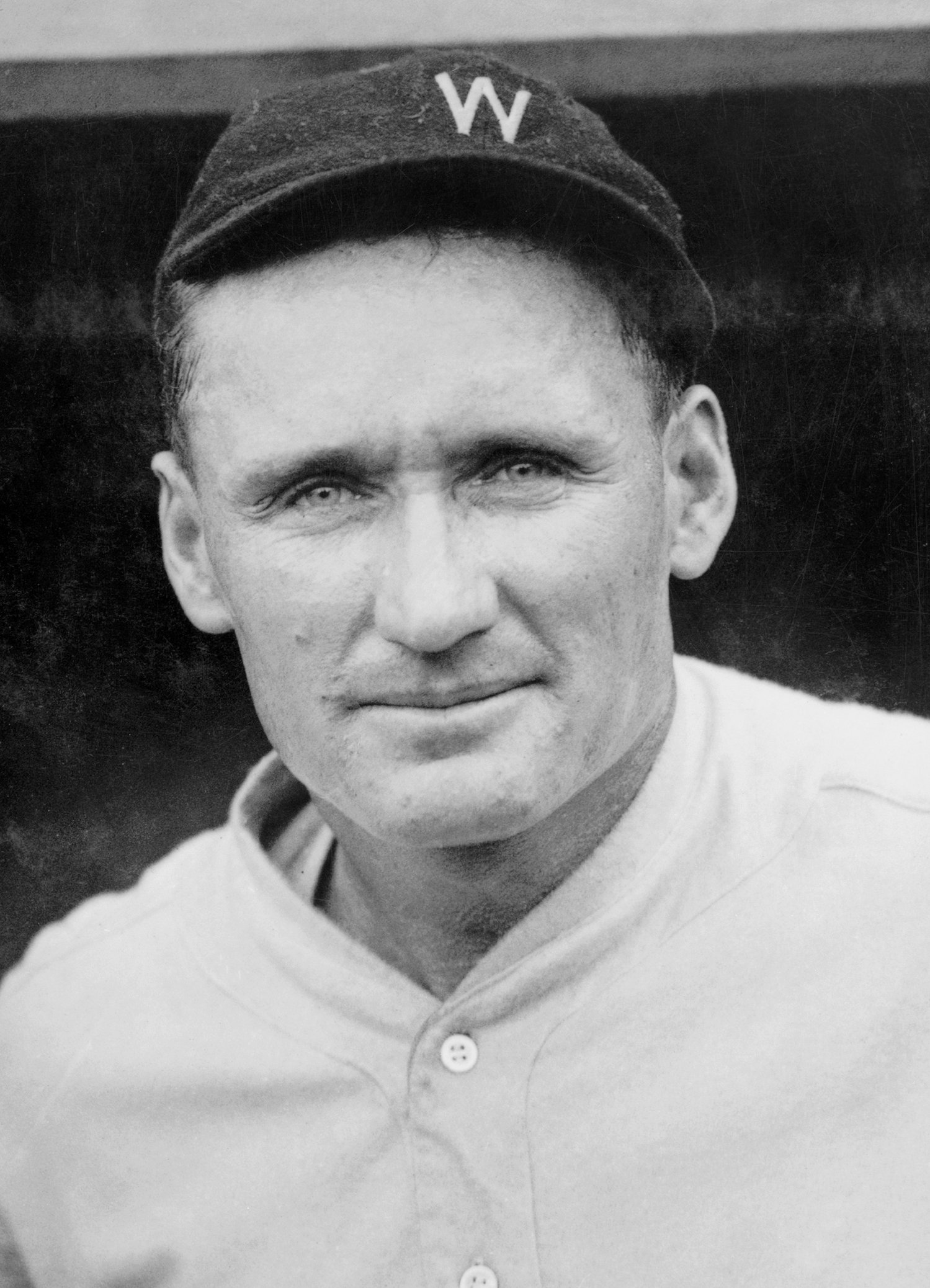
- Johnson with the Washington Senators in 1924
- Pitcher
- Born: November 6, 1887; Humboldt, Kansas, U.S.
- Died: December 10, 1946 (aged 59); Washington, D.C., U.S.
- Batted: Right Threw: Right

MLB debut
- August 2, 1907, for the Washington Senators

Last MLB appearance
- September 30, 1927, for the Washington Senators

MLB statistics
- Win–loss record: 417–279
- Earned run average: 2.17
- Strikeouts: 3,508
- Shutouts: 110
- Managerial record: 529–432
- Winning %: .550
- Stats at Baseball Reference
- Managerial record at Baseball Reference

Teams
- As player: Washington Senators (1907–1927); As manager: Washington Senators (1929–1932); Cleveland Indians (1933–1935)

Career highlights and awards
- World Series champion (1924); 2× AL MVP (1913, 1924); 3× Triple Crown (1913, 1918, 1924); 6× AL wins leader (1913–1916, 1918, 1924); 5× AL ERA leader (1912, 1913, 1918, 1919, 1924); 12× AL strikeout leader (1910, 1912–1919, 1921, 1923, 1924); Pitched a no-hitter on July 1, 1920; MLB record 110 career shutouts; Washington Nationals Ring of Honor; Major League Baseball All-Century Team; Major League Baseball All-Time Team

Member of the National

Baseball Hall of Fame
- Induction: 1936
- Vote: 83.6% (first ballot)

Walter Perry Johnson (November 6, 1887 – December 10, 1946), nicknamed "Barney" and "the Big Train", was an American professional baseball player and manager. He played his entire 21-year baseball career in Major League Baseball (MLB) as a right-handed pitcher for the Washington Senators from 1907 to 1927. He later served as manager of the Senators from 1929 through 1932 and of the Cleveland Indians from 1933 through 1935.

Generally regarded as one of the greatest pitchers in baseball history, Johnson established several records, some of which remain unbroken. He remains by far the all-time career leader in shutouts with 110, second in wins with 417, and fourth in complete games with 531. He held the career record in strikeouts from 1919, passing Christy Mathewson’s mark of 2,507, until 1983, when three players (Steve Carlton, Nolan Ryan and Gaylord Perry) passed his career total of 3,508. On July 22, 1923, Johnson became the first pitcher to record 3,000 strikeouts. He remained the only player to do so until Bob Gibson matched the feat on July 17, 1974. Of the club's 20 members, he pitched the most innings and has the lowest strikeouts per nine innings pitched (5.34 K/9). Johnson led the league in strikeouts for 12 total seasons, 8 of which were consecutive, both all-time records. He is the only pitcher in Major League history to record more than 400 wins and strike out more than 3,500 batters.

In 1936, Johnson was elected into the Baseball Hall of Fame as one of its "first five" inaugural members.

== Early life ==
Walter Perry Johnson was born on November 6, 1887, in Humboldt, Kansas. Johnson was the second of six children (Effie, Leslie, Earl, Blanche) born to Frank Edwin Johnson (1861–1921) and Minnie Olive Perry (1867–1967) on a rural farm four miles west of Humboldt, Kansas on November 6, 1887. Although he was sometimes said to be of Swedish ancestry and referred to by sportswriters as "the Big Swede," Johnson's ancestors came from the British Isles.

Soon after his fourteenth birthday, his family moved to California's Orange County in 1902. The Johnsons settled in the town of Olinda, a small oil boomtown located just east of Brea. In his youth, Johnson split his time among playing baseball, working in the nearby oil fields, and going horseback riding. Johnson later attended Fullerton Union High School where he struck out 27 batters during a 15-inning game against Santa Ana High School. He later moved to Idaho, where he doubled as a telephone company employee and a pitcher for a team in Weiser, of the Idaho State League. Johnson was spotted by catcher/scout Cliff Blankenship and signed a contract with the Washington Senators in July 1907 at the age of 19.

== Professional career ==
=== Washington Senators (1907–1927) ===
Johnson was renowned as the premier power pitcher of his era. Ty Cobb recalled his first encounter with the rookie fastballer:

On August 2, 1907, I encountered the most threatening sight I ever saw in the ball field. He was a rookie, and we licked our lips as we warmed up for the first game of a doubleheader in Washington.... The first time I faced him, I watched him take that easy windup. And then something went past me that made me flinch. The thing just hissed with danger. We couldn't touch him.... Every one of us knew we'd met the most powerful arm ever turned loose in a ball park.

In 1917, a Bridgeport, Connecticut, munitions laboratory recorded Johnson's fastball at 134 feet per second, which is equal to 91 miles per hour (146 km/h), a velocity that may have been unmatched in his day, with the possible exception of Smoky Joe Wood. Johnson, moreover, pitched with a sidearm motion, whereas power pitchers are usually known for pitching with a straight overhand delivery. Johnson's motion was especially difficult for right-handed batters to follow, as the ball seemed to be coming from third base. His pitching mechanics were superb, generating powerful rotation of his shoulders with excellent balance. In addition to his fastball, Johnson featured an occasional curveball that he developed around 1913 or 1914. He batted and threw right-handed.

The overpowering fastball was the primary reason for Johnson's exceptional statistics, especially his fabled strikeout totals. Johnson's record total of 3,508 strikeouts stood for more than 55 years until Nolan Ryan, Steve Carlton, and Gaylord Perry all surpassed it in that order during the 1983 season. Johnson, as of 2026, ranks eleventh on the all-time strikeout list, but his total must be understood in its proper context of an era of much fewer strikeouts. Among his pre–World War II contemporaries, only two men finished within 1,000 strikeouts of Johnson: runner-up Cy Young with 2,803 (705 strikeouts behind) and Tim Keefe at 2,562 (946 behind). Bob Feller, whose war-shortened career began in 1936, later ended up with 2,581.

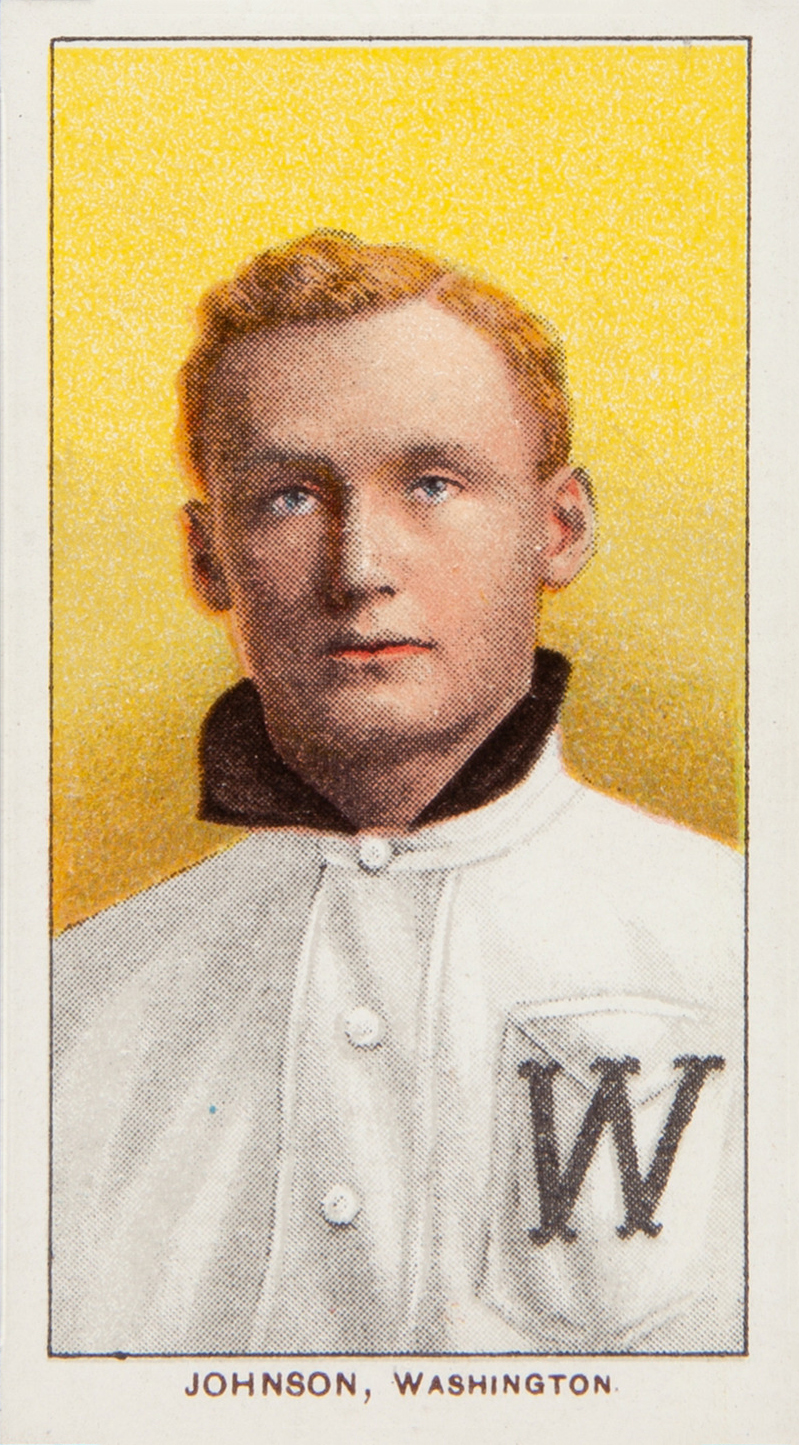
T206 Walter Johnson baseball card

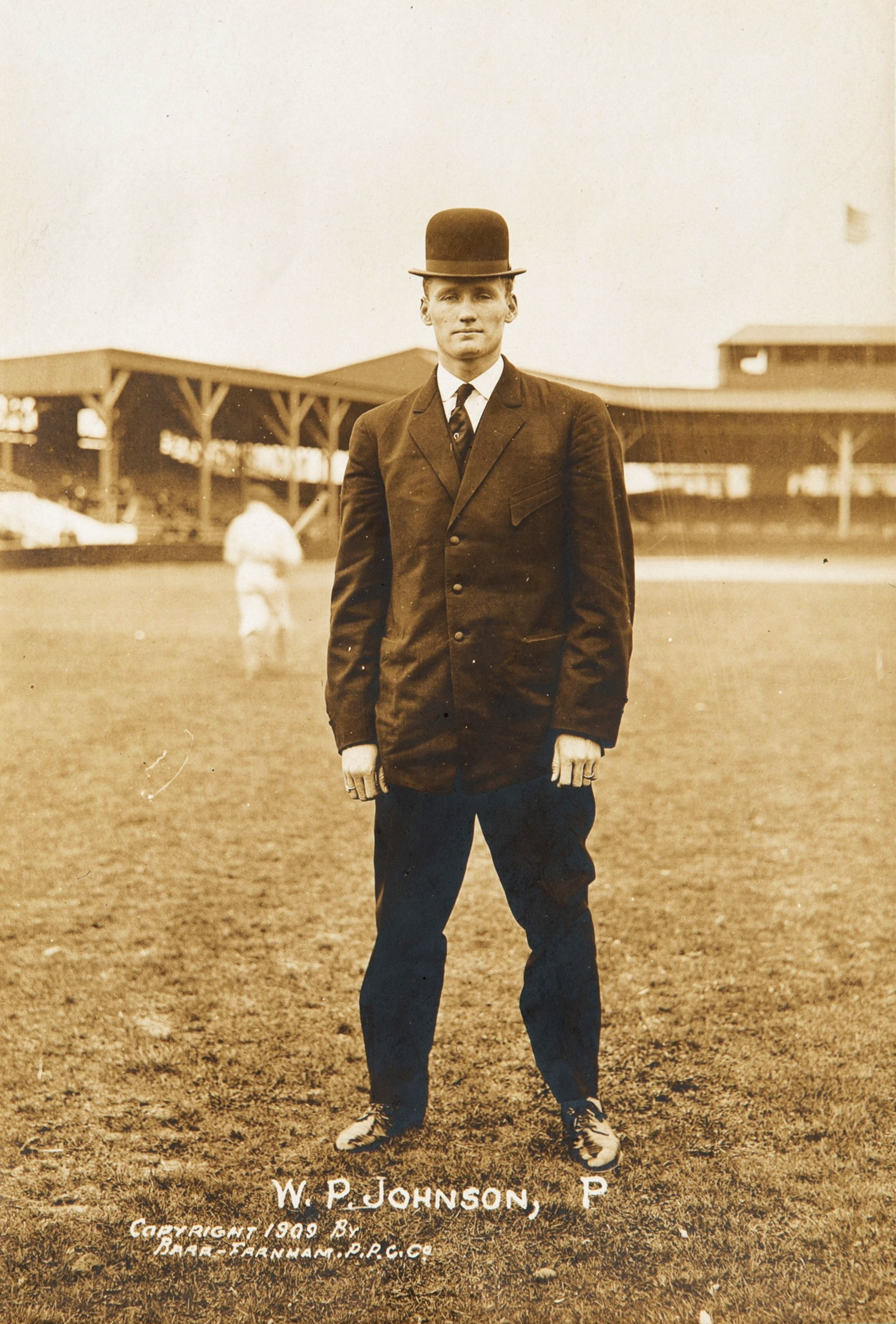
Walter Johnson in a 1909 portrait photograph

As a right-handed pitcher for the Washington Senators, Walter Johnson won 417 games, the second most by any pitcher in history (after Cy Young, who won 511). He and Young are the only pitchers to have won 400 games.

In a 21-year career, Johnson had twelve 20-win seasons, including ten in a row. Twice, he topped 30 wins (33 in 1912 and 36 in 1913). Johnson's record includes 110 shutouts, the most in baseball history. Johnson had a 38–26 record in games decided by a 1–0 score; both his wins and losses in these games are major league records. Johnson also lost 65 games because his teams failed to score a run. On September 4, 5 and 7, 1908, he shut out the New York Highlanders in three consecutive games.

Three times, Johnson won the triple crown for pitchers (1913, 1918 and 1924). Johnson twice won the American League Most Valuable Player Award (1913, 1924), a feat accomplished since by only two other pitchers, Carl Hubbell in 1933 and 1936 and Hal Newhouser in 1944 and 1945.

His earned run average of 1.14 in 1913 was the fourth-lowest ever at the time he recorded it; it remains the sixth-lowest today, despite having been surpassed by Bob Gibson in 1968 (1.12) for lowest ERA ever by a 300+ inning pitcher. It could have been lower if not for one of manager Clark Griffith's traditions. For the last game of the season, Griffith often treated the fans to a farce game. Johnson actually played center field that game until he was brought in to pitch. He allowed two hits before he was taken out of the game. The next pitcher—who was actually a career catcher—allowed both runners to score. The official scorekeeper ignored the game, but later, Johnson was charged with those two runs, raising his ERA from 1.09 to 1.14. For the decade from 1910 to 1919, Johnson averaged 26 wins per season and had an overall ERA of 1.59.

Johnson won 36 games in 1913, 40% of the team's total wins for the season. In April and May, he pitched 552/3 consecutive scoreless innings, which stood as the MLB record for 55 years and as of 2024 remains the American League's best and third-longest streak in history. He won 25 games and lost 20 games in 1916, the last pitcher to win and lose 20 in a season until knuckleballer Wilbur Wood did so in 1973. In May 1918, Johnson pitched 40 consecutive scoreless innings; he is the only pitcher with two such 40+ inning streaks.

Although he often pitched for losing teams during his career, Johnson finally led the Washington Senators to the World Series in 1924, his 18th year in the American League. Johnson lost the first and fifth games of the 1924 World Series, but became the hero by pitching four scoreless innings of relief in the seventh and deciding game, winning in the 12th inning. Washington returned to the World Series the following season, but Johnson's experience was close to the inverse: two early wins, followed by a game seven loss. On October 15, 1927, Johnson's request for an unconditional release from the club was granted.

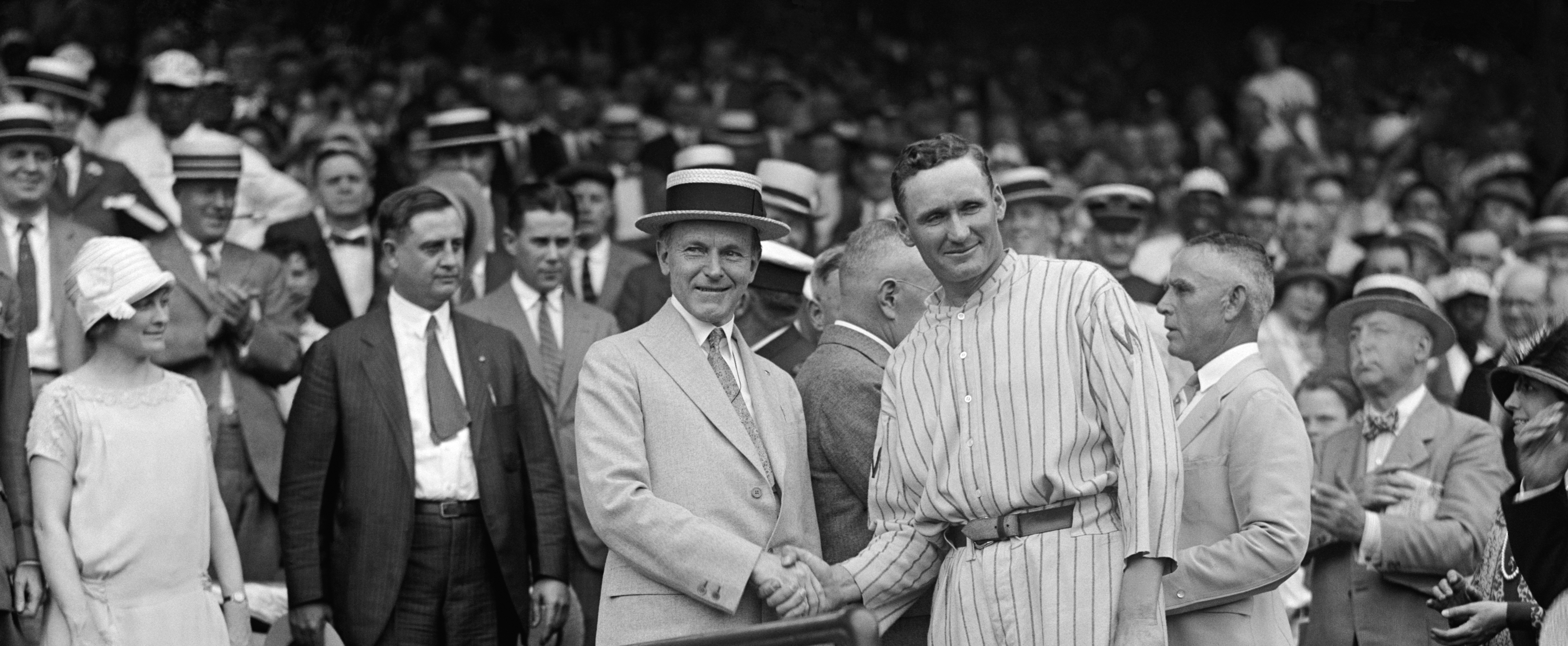
President Calvin Coolidge (left) and Washington Senators pitcher Walter Johnson (right) shake hands.

Johnson's Hall of Fame plaque reads that he pitched "for many years with a losing team." While the Senators had only nine winning seasons during his career, they finished in the first division (i. e., fourth place or higher) 11 times, and the second division 10 times. In Johnson's first five seasons, Washington finished last twice and next-to-last three times. But they finished second in the American League in both 1912 and 1913, which were Johnson's two 30-win seasons. Then, for the next decade, they typically finished in the middle of the pack before their back-to-back pennants.

Johnson was a good hitter for a pitcher, compiling a career batting average of .235, including a record .433 average in 1925. His 547 career hits are the most by a full-time pitcher. He also made 13 appearances in the outfield during his career. He hit over .200 in 13 of his 21 seasons, hit three home runs in 1914, and hit 12 doubles and a triple in 130 at-bats in 1917. 1919 marked the seventh year that he hit at least as many home runs as he allowed while pitching, all while pitching at least 296 innings those years. Johnson finished his career with 23 home runs as a pitcher (24 overall, including a pinch-hit home run in 1925), which at the time was third best for primary pitchers in MLB history. He currently has the tenth-highest total for a pitcher in Major League history.

Johnson had a reputation as a kindly person, and made many friends in baseball. As reported in The Glory of Their Times, Sam Crawford was one of Johnson's good friends, and sometimes in non-critical situations, Johnson would ease up so Crawford would hit well against him. This would vex Crawford's teammate Ty Cobb, who could not understand how Crawford could hit the great Johnson so well. Johnson was also friendly with Babe Ruth, despite Ruth's having hit some of his longest home runs off him at Griffith Stadium.

== Managerial career ==
=== Minor leagues ===
In 1928, Johnson began his career as a manager in the minor leagues, managing the Newark Bears of the International League.

=== Washington Senators (1929–1932) ===
Johnson continued on to the major leagues, managing the Washington Senators (1929–1932), and finally the Cleveland Indians (1933–1935). His managing record was 529–432, with his best team managed being in 1930, when the team finished 94–60, 8 games out of first place. In seven seasons, he had five winning seasons, with the only two losing seasons being at the beginning of his tenure with Washington and Cleveland, though his teams did not come close to winning the pennant, finishing 12 games behind in his final season. Johnson also served as a radio announcer on station WJSV for the Senators during the 1939 season.

== Managerial record ==
Team	Year	Regular season					Postseason			
Team	Year	Games	Won	Lost	Win %	Finish	Won	Lost	Win %	Result
WSH	1929	152	71	81	.467	5th in AL	–	–	–	
WSH	1930	154	94	60	.610	2nd in AL	–	–	–	
WSH	1931	154	92	62	.597	3rd in AL	–	–	–	
WSH	1932	154	93	61	.604	3rd in AL	–	–	–	
WSH total		614	350	264	.570		0	0	–	
CLE	1933	99	48	51	.485	Interim	–	–	–	
CLE	1934	154	85	69	.552	3rd in AL	–	–	–	
CLE	1935	94	46	48	.489	Fired	–	–	–	
CLE total		347	179	168	.516		0	0	–	
Total		961	529	432	.550		0	0	–	

== National Baseball Hall of Fame ==
Walter Johnson pitching

Johnson was one of the first five players elected to the Baseball Hall of Fame in 1936. Johnson, Ty Cobb, Christy Mathewson, Babe Ruth and Honus Wagner were known as the "Five Immortals" because they were the first players chosen for the Baseball Hall of Fame.

== Politics ==
Walter Johnson retired to Germantown, Maryland. On February 22, 1936, George Washington's 204th birthday, as a retired baseball legend, Johnson gained national publicity. He replicated a feat attributed to Washington by throwing a silver dollar across the Rappahannock River. Though it remained in dispute whether Washington ever did such a thing, Johnson did prove that it could be done.

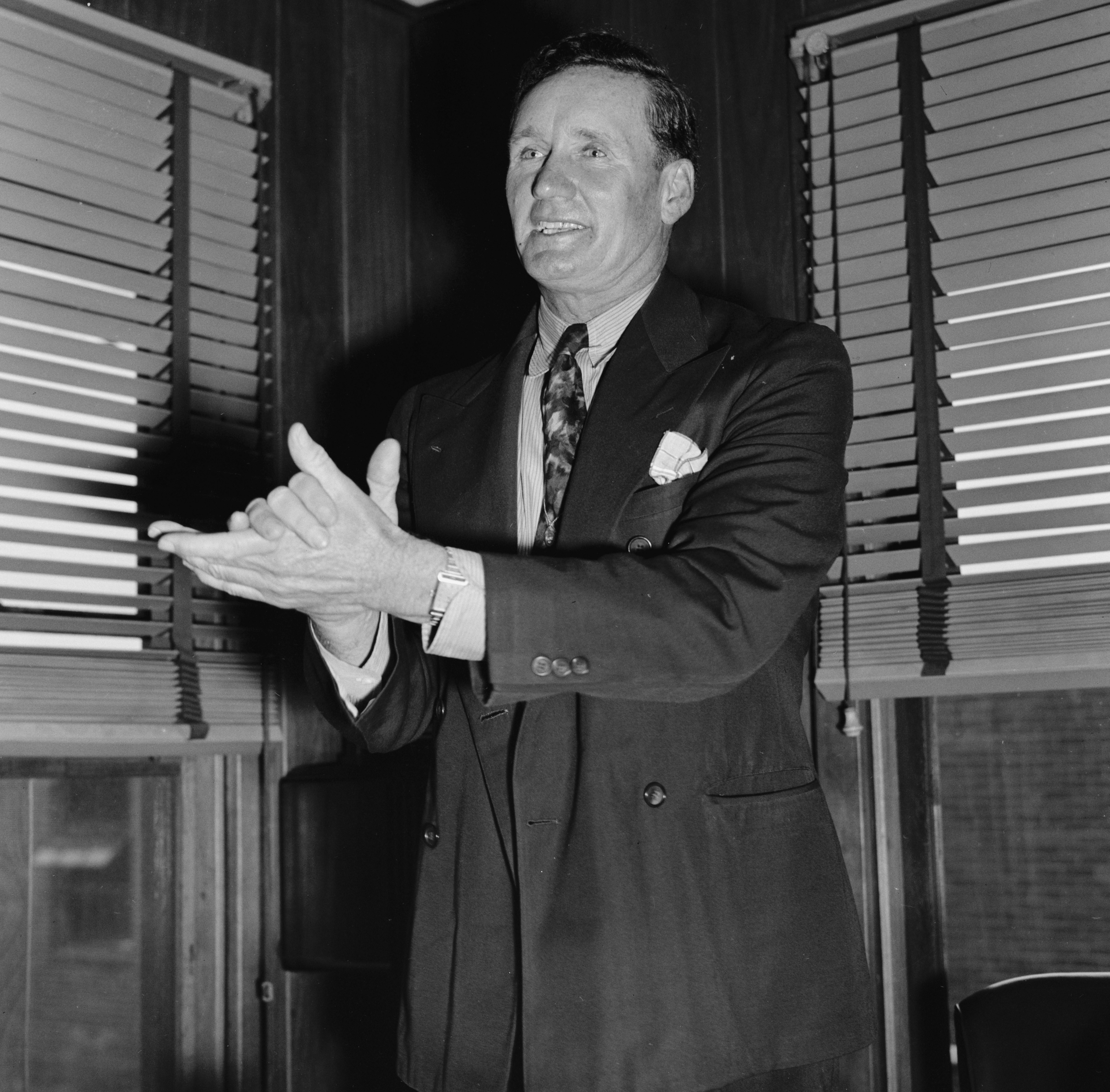
Johnson after winning the Republican nomination in 1938

A lifelong Republican and friend of President Calvin Coolidge, Johnson was elected as a Montgomery County commissioner in 1938. His father-in-law was Rep. Edwin Roberts, a Republican member of the U.S. House of Representatives. In 1940, Johnson ran for a congressional seat in Maryland's 6th district, but came up short against the incumbent Democrat, William D. Byron, by a total of 60,037 (53%) to 52,258 (47%).

Joseph W. Martin Jr., before he was the Speaker of the United States House of Representatives (1947–1949 and 1953–1955), recruited Johnson to run for Congress. "He was an utterly inexperienced speaker," Martin later said. "I got some of my boys to write two master speeches for him—one for the farmers of his district and the other for the industrial areas. Alas, he got the two confused. He addressed the farmers on industrial problems, and the businessmen on farm problems."

=== Electoral history ===
Maryland's 6th congressional district election, 1940
Party	Candidate	Votes	%
Democratic	William D. Byron (incumbent)	60,037	53.46
Republican	Walter Johnson	52,258	46.54
Total votes		112,295	100
Democratic hold			

== Personal life ==
Walter married Hazel Lee Roberts on June 24, 1914, and they had five children. Johnson's eldest daughter died from influenza in 1921. His wife died in August 1930 from complications resulting from heat stroke after a long motorcar ride from Kansas. Ty Cobb was a good friend of Johnson, often bringing Johnson's children gifts when he visited the family.

At 11:40 pm on Tuesday, December 10, 1946, Johnson died of a brain tumor in Washington, D.C., five weeks after his 59th birthday. He was interred at Rockville Cemetery in Rockville, Maryland.

== Legacy ==
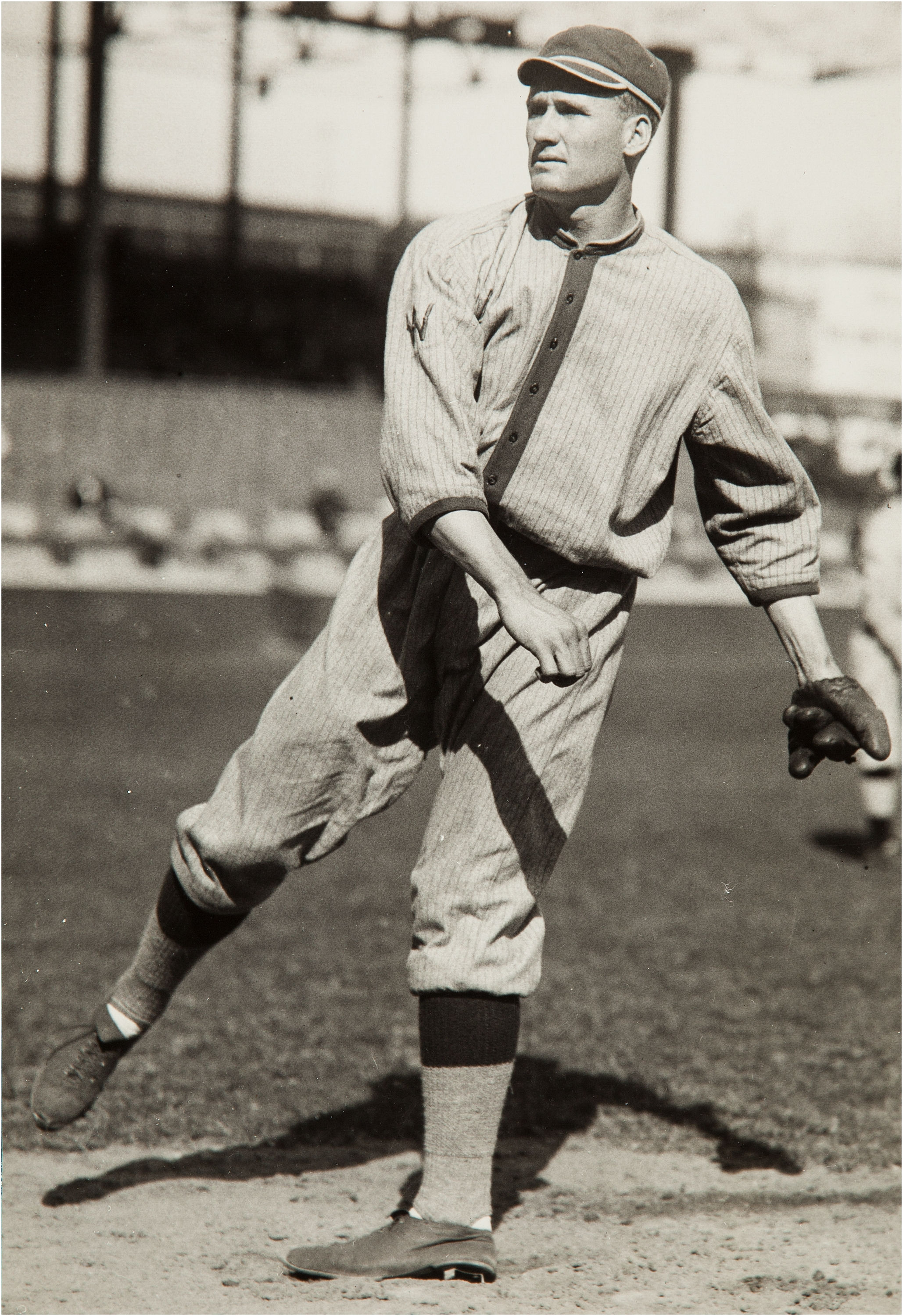
Johnson c. 1910s

- Walter Johnson High School in Bethesda, Maryland, is named for him. The monument to him that once stood outside Griffith Stadium has been moved to the school's campus. The school's yearbook is called The Windup and its newspaper is called The Pitch.
- A baseball field in Rockville, Maryland is named for him. A wood sculpture of him is located near the field.
- A large recreation park (Walter Johnson Park) is named after him in Coffeyville, Kansas, where he maintained a part-time residence for several years.
- The Bethesda Big Train, a summer collegiate baseball team based in Bethesda, Maryland, is named in his honor and features a Walter Johnson sculpture in front of their stadium. A sculpture of sportswriter Shirley Povich and Walter Johnson is located inside the stadium.
- The baseball field in Memorial Park in Weiser, Idaho is called Walter Johnson Field.
- Johnson was the first American League pitcher to strike out four batters in one inning.
- Johnson holds the record for most three-pitch innings by any major league pitcher, with four.
- In 2009, a statue of Johnson was installed inside the center field gate of Nationals Park along with ones of Frank Howard and Josh Gibson. They were moved to the home plate gate in 2015.
- Walter Johnson baseball field in Humboldt, Kansas.
- Walter Johnson Road in Germantown, Maryland.
- In 2024, a thick gray flannel jersey worn by Johnson between 1919 and 1922 was sold for $2.01 million at Heritage Auctions.

=== Nicknames ===
Johnson was also called "Sir Walter", "the White Knight", and "The Gentle Johnson" for his gentlemanly sportsmanship, and "Barney" after auto racer Barney Oldfield (he got out of a traffic ticket when a teammate in the car told the policeman Johnson was Barney Oldfield).

=== Other ===
In 1999, The Sporting News ranked Johnson number 4 on its list of Baseball's 100 Greatest Players, the highest-ranked pitcher. Later that year, he was elected to the Major League Baseball All-Century Team.

In 2020, The Athletic ranked Johnson at number 7 on its "Baseball 100" list, compiled by sportswriter Joe Posnanski. In 2022, as part of their SN Rushmore project, The Sporting News named Johnson on their "Washington, D.C. Mount Rushmore of Sports", along with Washington Capitals hockey player Alexander Ovechkin, Washington Redskins football player Darrell Green, and Washington Bullets basketball player Wes Unseld.

In 1985, Jonathan Richman recorded the song "Walter Johnson", which dwelt on Johnson's personality and behaviour as an exemplar of what can be good in sport.

In 2015, he along with Nap Lajoie, Christy Mathewson and Cy Young were named the "Greatest Pioneers Group." They were voted for by baseball fans online as part of the Franchise Four competition and were "selected as the most impactful players". The results were announced at the 2015 MLB All-Star Game.

Johnson's gentle nature was legendary, and to this day he is held up as an example of good sportsmanship, while his name has become synonymous with friendly competition. This attribute worked to Johnson's disadvantage in the case of fellow Hall of Famer Ty Cobb. Virtually all batters were concerned about being hit by Johnson's fastball, and many would not "dig in" at the plate because of that concern. Cobb realized that the good-hearted Johnson was privately nervous about the possibility of seriously injuring a batter. Almost alone among his peers, Cobb would actually stand closer to the plate than usual when facing Johnson.

Johnson is mentioned in the poem "Line-Up for Yesterday" by Ogden Nash:

Line-Up for Yesterday

J is for Johnson
The Big Train in his prime
Was so fast he could throw
Three strikes at a time.

— Ogden Nash, Sport magazine (January 1949)

== Career statistics ==
=== Pitching ===
Category	W	L	ERA	GS	CG	SHO	SV	IP	HR	BB	SO	HBP	WHIP	FIP	ERA+
Total	417	279	2.17	666	531	110	34	5,914.1	97	1,363	3,509	205	1.061	2.38	147

Note: Official MLB statistics show 3,508 career strikeouts, with 70 in his first season (1907) while statistics at websites such as ESPN, Baseball-Reference, and the official site of the Baseball Hall of Fame (see "External Links", below) all show 3,509 career strikeouts, with 71 in his first season. This has resulted in minor differences seen in references to Johnson's record when reading media and Wikipedia articles of other pitchers in the 3000 strikeout club.

=== Hitting ===
Category	G	BA	AB	R	H	2B	3B	HR	RBI	SB	CS	BB	SO	OBP	SLG	OPS
Total	934	.235	2,324	241	547	94	41	24	255	13	N/A	110	419	.274	.342	.616

Note: Major League Baseball began to regularly track "caught stealing" in 1951; prior to that year, records on this statistic are either incomplete or not recorded at all.

== See also ==
- Walter Johnson High School
- List of Major League Baseball career strikeout leaders
- List of Major League Baseball career wins leaders
- List of Major League Baseball career ERA leaders
- List of Major League Baseball career FIP leaders
- List of Major League Baseball annual ERA leaders
- List of Major League Baseball no-hitters
- List of Major League Baseball annual strikeout leaders
- List of Major League Baseball annual wins leaders
- List of Major League Baseball career hit batsmen leaders
- List of Major League Baseball all-time leaders in home runs by pitchers
- List of Major League Baseball single-inning strikeout leaders
- List of Major League Baseball players who spent their entire career with one franchise
- Major League Baseball titles leaders
- Major League Baseball Triple Crown
- List of Washington Senators Opening Day starting pitchers

== Notes ==
Achievements
Preceded by Rube Waddell	American League Pitching Triple Crown; 1913, 1918 & 1924	Succeeded by Lefty Grove
Preceded by Ray Caldwell	No-hitter pitcher July 1, 1920	Succeeded by Charlie Robertson
