= Murderers' Row =

New York Yankees lineup

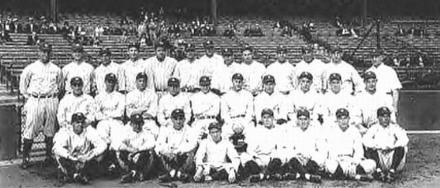
The 1927 New York Yankees.

Murderers' Row were the baseball teams of the New York Yankees in the late 1920s, widely considered some of the best teams in history. The nickname is particularly used for the first six hitters in the 1927 team lineup: Earle Combs, Mark Koenig, Babe Ruth, Lou Gehrig, Bob Meusel, and Tony Lazzeri.

== Etymology ==
The term, which mimicked the name applied to a section of the Tombs prison in New York City, was applied to several different baseball teams before it became associated with the Babe Ruth-era Yankees. A 1905 newspaper article about the Yale baseball team notes that one of Yale's coaches, Billy Lush, who had been an outfielder with the Cleveland Naps the year before, was "a member of 'Murderer's Row,' as pitchers call the first six batters on the Cleveland list." The term was also used for the Philadelphia Phillies, the Philadelphia Athletics, and for some minor league and college teams. It was first applied to the Yankees in 1918, two years before Ruth joined the team. Ruth used the term himself in 1920 referring to the Yankees lineup, in his book, "Playing the Game, My Early Years in Baseball."

== 1927 Yankees ==
The term was initially associated with the beginning of Babe Ruth and Lou Gehrig Yankee teams in the mid-1920s, and is commonly recognized to refer specifically to the core of the 1927 Yankee hitting lineup.

Owner Jacob Ruppert is the man most often credited with building the team, although general manager Ed Barrow may have had as much to do with it. In a game of a July series against the Washington Senators the Yankees won 21–1, prompting Senators' first baseman Joe Judge to say, "Those fellows not only beat you but they tear your heart out. I wish the season was over."

=== Season results ===
The 1927 season was particularly spectacular by baseball standards for the Yankees. After losing in the 1926 World Series to the St. Louis Cardinals, they went 110–44 (.714) the next year, won the A.L. pennant by 19 games, and swept the Pittsburgh Pirates in the World Series. Only five teams have won more regular season games: the 1906 Chicago Cubs and the 2001 Seattle Mariners with 116, the 1998 Yankees with 114 and the 1954 Cleveland Indians and 2022 Los Angeles Dodgers with 111. However, the 1998 Yankees, 2001 Mariners, and 2022 Dodgers played eight more games. Both the Cubs and the Indians lost in the World Series, while the Mariners lost to the Yankees in the ALCS and the Dodgers lost to the Padres in the NLDS. The 1998 Yankees went 11–2 in the playoffs, sweeping the San Diego Padres in the World Series.

The 1927 Yankees batted .307, slugged .489, scored 975 runs, and outscored their opponents by a record 376 runs. Center fielder Earle Combs had a career best year, batting .356 with 231 hits, left fielder Bob Meusel batted .337 with 103 RBIs, and second baseman Tony Lazzeri drove in 102 runs. Gehrig batted .373, with 218 hits, 52 doubles, 18 triples, 47 home runs, a then record 175 RBIs, slugged at .765, and was voted A.L. MVP. Ruth amassed a .356 batting average, 164 RBIs, 158 runs scored, walked 137 times, and slugged .772. Most notably, his 60 home runs that year broke his own record and remained the Major League mark for 34 years until Roger Maris broke it by one with 61; however, just like the 1998 Yankees and 2001 Mariners, this was done in a 162-game schedule, a fact that Commissioner Ford Frick, a close friend of Ruth, wanted noted when the single-season home run record was to be referenced.

The 1927 Yankees pitching staff led the league in ERA at 3.20, and included Waite Hoyt (22–7), tied for the league lead in wins, and Herb Pennock at 19–8. Wilcy Moore won 16 as a reliever, and three other Yankee pitchers had ERAs under 3.00 that season.

After sweeping the Pirates in the Series, the Yankees repeated the feat in 1928 by sweeping the Cardinals. They remain the only MLB franchise to sweep consecutive World Series; the Yankee teams of 1938–1939 and 1998–1999 repeated the feat.

=== Hall of Fame players ===
The 1927 Yankees would eventually send six players along with manager Miller Huggins and president Ed Barrow to the Baseball Hall of Fame. These were Babe Ruth, Lou Gehrig, Hoyt, Lazzeri, Combs, and Pennock. Only the 1928 Yankees had more, with nine players (including infielder Leo Durocher, inducted based on his subsequent managerial accomplishments) along with Huggins and Barrow.

=== Roster ===
Key
†	Elected to the Baseball Hall of Fame
#	Position in the lineup
AB	At-bats
R	Runs
H	Hits
BA	Batting average
OBP	On-base percentage
SLG	Slugging percentage
HR	Home runs
RBI	Runs batted in

Starting lineup
#	Player	Position	Games	AB	R	H	BA	OBP	SLG	HR	RBI
1	Earle Combs^{†}	CF	152	648	137	231	.356	.414	.511	6	64
2	Mark Koenig	SS	123	526	99	150	.285	.320	.382	3	62
3	Babe Ruth^{†}	RF	151	540	158	192	.356	.486	.772	60	164
4	Lou Gehrig^{†}	1B	155	584	149	218	.373	.474	.765	47	175
5	Bob Meusel	LF	135	516	75	174	.337	.393	.510	8	103
6	Tony Lazzeri^{†}	2B	153	570	92	176	.309	.383	.482	18	102
7	Joe Dugan	3B	112	387	44	104	.269	.321	.362	2	43
8	Pat Collins	C	92	251	38	69	.275	.407	.418	7	36

Bench players
Player	Position	Games	AB	Hits	BA	HR	RBI
Benny Bengough	C	31	85	21	.247	0	10
Johnny Grabowski	C	70	195	54	.277	0	25
Mike Gazella	IF	54	115	32	.278	0	9
Ray Morehart	IF	73	195	50	.256	1	20
Julian Wera	IF	38	42	10	.238	1	8
Cedric Durst	OF	65	129	32	.248	0	25
Ben Paschal	OF	50	82	26	.317	2	16

Pitchers
Player	Role	G	IP	W	L	ERA	SO
Waite Hoyt^{†}	SP	36	256 1/3	22	7	2.63	86
Herb Pennock^{†}	SP	34	209 2/3	19	8	3.00	51
George Pipgras	SP	29	166 1/3	10	3	4.11	81
Dutch Ruether	SP	27	184	13	6	3.38	45
Urban Shocker	SP	31	200	18	6	2.84	35
Wilcy Moore	RP	50	213	19	7	2.28	75
Myles Thomas	RP	21	88 2/3	7	4	4.87	25
Bob Shawkey	RP	19	43 2/3	3	4	2.89	23
Joe Giard	RP	16	27	0	0	8.00	10
Walter Beall	RP	1	1	0	0	9.00	0

== Legacy ==
The term "Murderers' Row" is commonly used as a descriptor for teams with formidable talent. It has also been used outside of sports, an example being the Essex-class carriers anchored at Ulithi Atoll, which were also known as Murderer's Row.

During the 2006 American League Division Series, Detroit Tigers manager Jim Leyland referred to the 2006 Yankees as "Murderers' Row and Cano" since the entire lineup consisted of players such as Johnny Damon, Derek Jeter, Bobby Abreu, Gary Sheffield, Hideki Matsui, Alex Rodriguez, Jason Giambi, Jorge Posada and new second baseman Robinson Canó all of whom would have multiple All-Star game appearances over their careers. Despite Leyland's nomenclature, the team did not have the success of the original 1927 team as they were defeated by the Tigers in that series.

In 2016, ESPN announced 1927: The Diary of Myles Thomas. The core of the project is a historical novel in the form of a diary of Myles Thomas, written by Douglas Alden, published along the same timeline as the events unfolded almost 90 years ago. The project was an attempt to relive the 1927 season through Myles Thomas's diary entries, additional essays and real-time social-media components (including Twitter, etc). The diary runs the length of the full 1927 season, from April 13 through October 10, 1927.

== See also ==
- M&M Boys
- Core Four
- 1927 New York Yankees season
