= 1927 New York Yankees season =

Season for the Major League Baseball team the New York Yankees

1927 New York Yankees
- World Series champions American League champions
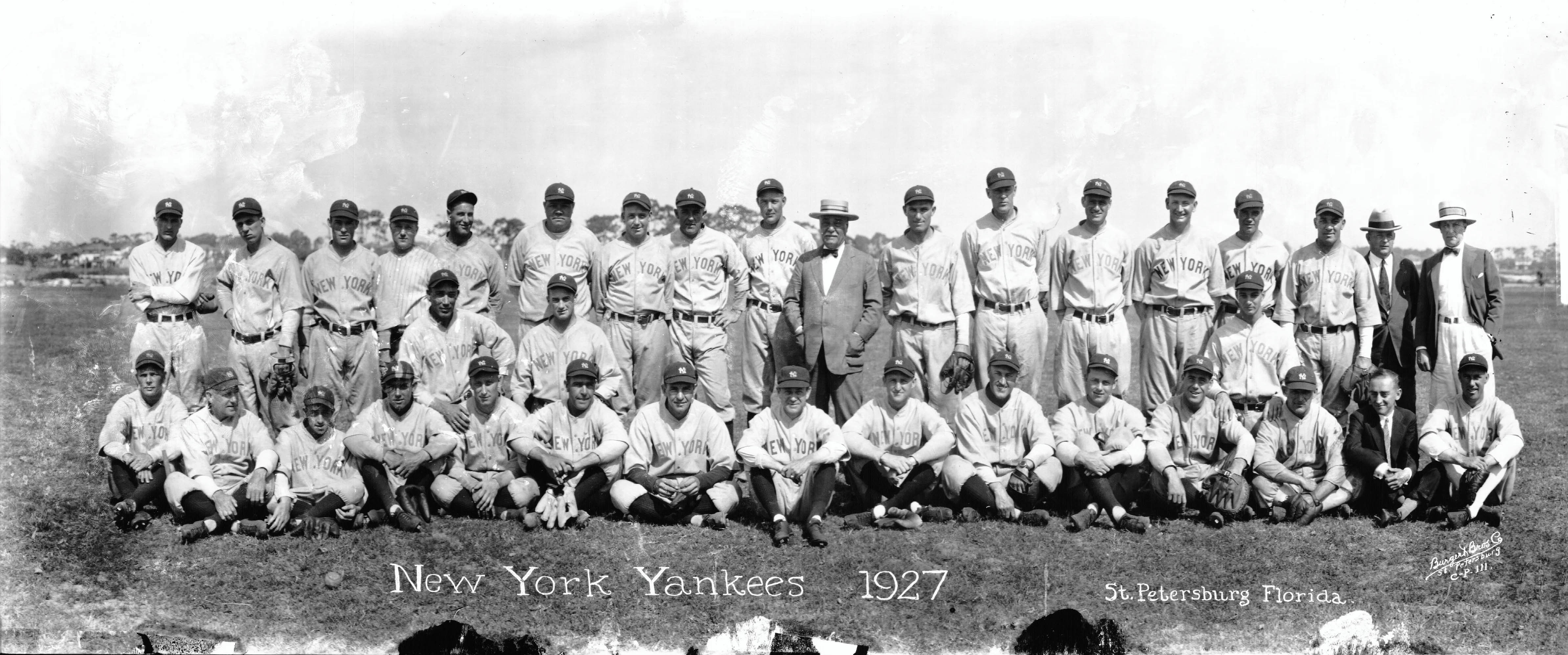
- League: American League
- Ballpark: Yankee Stadium
- City: New York City, New York
- Record: 110–44 (.714)
- League place: 1st
- Owners: Colonel Jacob Ruppert
- General managers: Ed Barrow
- Managers: Miller Huggins

The 1927 New York Yankees season was the 25th season of the New York Yankees of the American League. The team finished with a record of 110–44–1 (the team's first 100 win season), winning their fifth pennant and finishing 19 games ahead of the Philadelphia Athletics and were tied for first or better for the whole season. New York was managed by Miller Huggins, and played at Yankee Stadium. They won the 1927 World Series, sweeping the Pittsburgh Pirates. This Yankees team was known for its feared lineup, which was nicknamed "Murderers' Row", and is widely considered to be the greatest baseball team in MLB history.

Babe Ruth and Lou Gehrig finished the 1927 season with 12.6 and 11.9 Wins Above Replacement (WAR), respectively. These totals are among the top ten highest single-season WAR by a player in MLB history, with Ruth's 12.6 ranking third (behind his 12.8 WAR in 1921 and 14.1 WAR in 1923) and Gehrig's 11.9 ranking sixth.

== Regular season ==
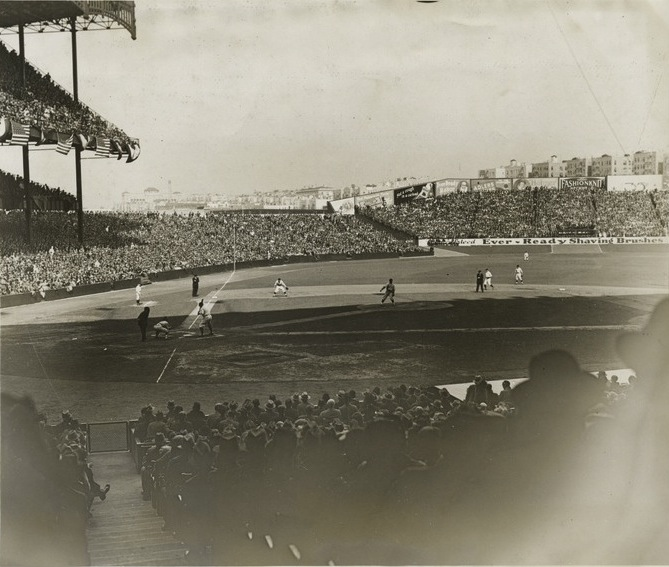
Yankee Stadium in 1927

The Yankees' 110 victories broke the previous American League mark of 105 (set by the 1912 Boston Red Sox) and would stand as the American League single-season record until it was broken by the Cleveland Indians in 1954. But counting their World Series sweep, the 1927 Yankees had a total record of 114–44 --- which is still the all-time highest single-season winning percentage (.721) in American League history. The 1998 Yankees, who also won their World Series in a sweep, are second with a full-season mark of 125–50 (.714).

This was the first year the Yankees acknowledged their team nickname on their uniforms, albeit their road uniforms. Their home uniforms remained free of any kind of logo except for the "NY" on their caps.

The roster included nine future Hall of Famers: Pitchers Herb Pennock and Waite Hoyt, Infielders Lou Gehrig and Tony Lazzeri, outfielders Babe Ruth and Earle Combs, Manager Miller Huggins, Team President Ed Barrow and Owner Colonel Jacob Ruppert.

=== Babe Ruth ===
With the race long since decided, the nation's attention turned to Babe Ruth's pursuit of his own home run mark of 59, set in 1921. Early in the season, Ruth expressed doubts about his chances: "I don't suppose I'll ever break that 1921 record. To do that, you've got to start early, and the pitchers have got to pitch to you. I don't start early, and the pitchers haven't really pitched to me in four seasons. I get more bad balls to hit than any other five men...and fewer good ones." Ruth was also being challenged for his slugger's crown by teammate Lou Gehrig, who nudged ahead of Ruth's total in midseason, prompting the New York World-Telegram to anoint Gehrig the favorite. But Ruth caught Gehrig (who would finish with 47), and then had a remarkable last leg of the season, hitting 17 home runs in September. His 60th came on September 30, in the Yankees' next-to-last game against the Washington Senators at Yankee Stadium. Tied 2–2, he hit a 2-run home run in the bottom of the 8th inning off of Tom Zachary, where they won the game 4–2. Ruth was exultant, shouting after the game, "Sixty, count 'em, sixty! Let's see some other son of a bitch match that!" In later years, he would give Gehrig some credit: "Pitchers began pitching to me because if they passed me they still had Lou to contend with." In addition to his career-high 60 home runs, Ruth batted .356, drove in 165 runs and slugged .772.

==== Babe Ruth's 60 home runs ====
HR	Date	Pitcher	Threw	Team	Location	Result	Score	Inning	Type of HR
1	April 15, 1927	Howard Ehmke	Right	Philadelphia Athletics	Yankee Stadium	Won	6–3	Bottom of the 1st	Solo
2	April 23, 1927	Rube Walberg	Left	Philadelphia Athletics	Shibe Park	Lost	3–4	Top of the 1st	Solo
3	April 24, 1927	Sloppy Thurston	Right	Washington Senators	Griffith Stadium	Won	6–2	Top of the 6th	Solo
4	April 29, 1927	Slim Harriss	Right	Boston Red Sox	Fenway Park	Won	9–0	Top of the 5th	Solo
5	May 1, 1927	Jack Quinn	Right	Philadelphia Athletics	Yankee Stadium	Won	7–3	Bottom of the 1st	2-Run HR
6	May 1, 1927	Rube Walberg	Left	Philadelphia Athletics	Yankee Stadium	Won	7–3 (2nd HR)	Bottom of the 8th	Solo
7	May 10, 1927	Milt Gaston	Right	St. Louis Browns	Sportsman's Park	Won	8–7	Top of the 1st	3-Run HR
8	May 11, 1927	Ernie Nevers	Right	St. Louis Browns	Sportsman's Park	Won	4–2	Top of the 1st	2-Run HR
9	May 17, 1927	Rip Collins	Right	Detroit Tigers	Navin Field	Won	9–2	Top of the 8th	Solo
10	May 22, 1927	Benn Karr	Right	Cleveland Indians	Dunn Field	Won	9–2	Top of the 6th	2-Run HR
11	May 23, 1927	Sloppy Thurston	Right	Washington Senators	Griffith Stadium	Lost	2–3	Top of the 1st	Solo
12	May 28, 1927	Sloppy Thurston	Right	Washington Senators	Yankee Stadium	Won 1st Game	9–2	Bottom of the 7th	3-Run HR
13	May 29, 1927	Danny MacFayden	Right	Boston Red Sox	Yankee Stadium	Won	15–7	Bottom of the 8th	Solo
14	May 30, 1927	Rube Walberg	Left	Philadelphia Athletics	Shibe Park	Won 2nd Game	6–5 in extra innings	Top of the 11th	Solo
15	May 31, 1927	Jack Quinn	Right	Philadelphia Athletics	Shibe Park	Won 1st Game	10–3	Top of the 1st	2-Run HR
16	May 31, 1927	Howard Ehmke	Right	Philadelphia Athletics	Shibe Park	Won 2nd Game	18–5	Top of the 5th	2-Run HR
17	June 5, 1927	Earl Whitehill	Left	Detroit Tigers	Yankee Stadium	Won	5–3	Bottom of the 6th	Solo
18	June 7, 1927	Tommy Thomas	Right	Chicago White Sox	Yankee Stadium	Won	4–1	Bottom of the 4th	Solo
19	June 11, 1927	Garland Buckeye	Left	Cleveland Indians	Yankee Stadium	Won	6–4	Bottom of the 3rd	2-Run HR
20	June 11, 1927	Garland Buckeye	Left	Cleveland Indians	Yankee Stadium	Won	6–4 (2nd HR)	Bottom of the 5th	Solo
21	June 12, 1927	George Uhle	Right	Cleveland Indians	Yankee Stadium	Lost	7–8	Bottom of the 7th	Solo
22	June 16, 1927	Tom Zachary	Left	St. Louis Browns	Yankee Stadium	Won	8–1	Bottom of the 1st	2-Run HR
23	June 22, 1927	Hal Wiltse	Left	Boston Red Sox	Fenway Park	Won 1st Game	7–4	Top of the 5th	Solo
24	June 22, 1927	Hal Wiltse	Left	Boston Red Sox	Fenway Park	Won 1st Game	7–4 (2nd HR)	Top of the 7th	2-Run HR
25	June 30, 1927	Slim Harriss	Right	Boston Red Sox	Yankee Stadium	Won	13–6	Bottom of the 4th	2-Run HR
26	July 3, 1927	Hod Lisenbee	Right	Washington Senators	Griffith Stadium	Lost	5–6	Top of the 1st	Solo
27	July 8, 1927	Don Hankins	Right	Detroit Tigers	Navin Field	Won 2nd Game	10–8	Top of the 2nd	3-Run HR (Inside The Park)
28	July 9, 1927	Ken Holloway	Right	Detroit Tigers	Navin Field	Won 1st Game	19–7	Top of the 1st	2-Run HR
29	July 9, 1927	Ken Holloway	Right	Detroit Tigers	Navin Field	Won 1st Game	19–7 (2nd HR)	Top of the 4th	3-Run HR
30	July 12, 1927	Joe Shaute	Left	Cleveland Indians	Dunn Field	Won	7–0	Top of the 9th	2-Run HR
31	July 24, 1927	Tommy Thomas	Right	Chicago White Sox	Comiskey Park	Won	3–2	Top of the 3rd	Solo
32	July 26, 1927	Milt Gaston	Right	St. Louis Browns	Yankee Stadium	Won 1st Game	15–1	Bottom of the 1st	2-Run HR
33	July 26, 1927	Milt Gaston	Right	St. Louis Browns	Yankee Stadium	Won 1st Game	15–1 (2nd HR)	Bottom of the 6th	Solo
34	July 28, 1927	Lefty Stewart	Left	St. Louis Browns	Yankee Stadium	Won	9–4	Bottom of the 8th	2-Run HR
35	August 5, 1927	George Smith	Right	Detroit Tigers	Yankee Stadium	Won	5–2	Bottom of the 8th	Solo
36	August 10, 1927	Tom Zachary	Left	Washington Senators	Griffith Stadium	Won	4–3	Top of the 3rd	3-Run HR
37	August 16, 1927	Tommy Thomas	Right	Chicago White Sox	Comiskey Park	Won	8–1	Top of the 5th	Solo
38	August 17, 1927	Sarge Connally	Right	Chicago White Sox	Comiskey Park	Won	3–2 in extra innings	Top of the 11th	Solo
39	August 20, 1927	Jake Miller	Left	Cleveland Indians	Dunn Field	Lost	8–14	Top of the 1st	2-Run HR
40	August 22, 1927	Joe Shaute	Left	Cleveland Indians	Dunn Field	Lost	4–9	Top of the 1st	Solo
41	August 27, 1927	Ernie Nevers	Right	St. Louis Browns	Sportsman's Park	Won	14–4	Top of the 8th	2-Run HR
42	August 28, 1927	Ernie Wingard	Left	St. Louis Browns	Sportsman's Park	Won	10–6	Top of the 1st	2-Run HR
43	August 31, 1927	Tony Welzer	Right	Boston Red Sox	Yankee Stadium	Won	10–3	Bottom of the 8th	Solo
44	September 2, 1927	Rube Walberg	Left	Philadelphia Athletics	Shibe Park	Won	12–2	Top of the 1st	Solo
45	September 6, 1927	Tony Welzer	Right	Boston Red Sox	Fenway Park	Won 1st Game	14–2	Top of the 6th	3-Run HR
46	September 6, 1927	Tony Welzer	Right	Boston Red Sox	Fenway Park	Won 1st Game	14–2 (2nd HR)	Top of the 7th	2-Run HR
47	September 6, 1927	Jack Russell	Right	Boston Red Sox	Fenway Park	Lost	2–5	Top of the 9th	Solo
48	September 7, 1927	Danny MacFayden	Right	Boston Red Sox	Fenway Park	Won	12–10	Top of the 1st	Solo
49	September 7, 1927	Slim Harriss	Right	Boston Red Sox	Fenway Park	Won	12–10 (2nd HR)	Top of the 8th	2-Run HR
50	September 11, 1927	Milt Gaston	Right	St. Louis Browns	Yankee Stadium	Lost	2–6	Bottom of the 4th	Solo
51	September 13, 1927	Willis Hudlin	Right	Cleveland Indians	Yankee Stadium	Won 1st Game	5–3	Bottom of the 7th	2-Run HR
52	September 13, 1927	Joe Shaute	Left	Cleveland Indians	Yankee Stadium	Won 2nd Game	5–3	Bottom of the 4th	Solo
53	September 16, 1927	Ted Blankenship	Right	Chicago White Sox	Yankee Stadium	Won	7–2	Bottom of the 3rd	Solo
54	September 18, 1927	Ted Lyons	Right	Chicago White Sox	Yankee Stadium	Won 2nd Game	5–4	Bottom of the 5th	2-Run HR
55	September 21, 1927	Sam Gibson	Right	Detroit Tigers	Yankee Stadium	Lost	1–6	Bottom of the 9th	Solo
56	September 22, 1927	Ken Holloway	Right	Detroit Tigers	Yankee Stadium	Won	8–7	Bottom of the 9th	2-Run HR
57	September 27, 1927	Lefty Grove	Left	Philadelphia Athletics	Yankee Stadium	Won	7–4	Bottom of the 6th	Grand Slam
58	September 29, 1927	Hod Lisenbee	Right	Washington Senators	Yankee Stadium	Won	15–4	Bottom of the 1st	Solo
59	September 29, 1927	Paul Hopkins	Right	Washington Senators	Yankee Stadium	Won	15–4 (2nd HR)	Bottom of the 5th	Grand Slam
60	September 30, 1927	Tom Zachary	Left	Washington Senators	Yankee Stadium	Won	4–2	Bottom of the 8th	2-Run HR

=== Season standings ===
American League
Team	W	L	Pct.	GB	Home	Road
New York Yankees	110	44	.714	—	57‍–‍19	53‍–‍25
Philadelphia Athletics	91	63	.591	19	50‍–‍27	41‍–‍36
Washington Senators	85	69	.552	25	51‍–‍28	34‍–‍41
Detroit Tigers	82	71	.536	27½	44‍–‍32	38‍–‍39
Chicago White Sox	70	83	.458	39½	38‍–‍37	32‍–‍46
Cleveland Indians	66	87	.431	43½	35‍–‍42	31‍–‍45
St. Louis Browns	59	94	.386	50½	38‍–‍38	21‍–‍56
Boston Red Sox	51	103	.331	59	29‍–‍49	22‍–‍54

=== Record vs. opponents ===
1927 American League record Sources:
Team	BOS	CWS	CLE	DET	NYY	PHA	SLB	WSH
Boston	—	11–11	15–7	5–17	4–18	6–16	6–16	4–18
Chicago	11–11	—	8–14	13–8	5–17	8–14	15–7	10–12
Cleveland	7–15	14–8	—	7–15	10–12	10–12	10–11	8–14
Detroit	17–5	8–13	15–7	—	8–14	9–13	14–8–1	11–11–2
New York	18–4	17–5	12–10	14–8	—	14–8–1	21–1	14–8
Philadelphia	16–6	14–8	12–10	13–9	8–14–1	—	16–6	12–10
St. Louis	16–6	7–15	11–10	8–14–1	1–21	6–16	—	10–12–1
Washington	18–4	12–10	14–8	11–11–2	8–14	10–12	12–10–1	—

=== Roster ===
1927 New York Yankees
Roster
Pitchers: Walter Beall; Joe Giard; Waite Hoyt; Wilcy Moore; Herb Pennock; George Pipgras; Dutch Ruether; Bob Shawkey; Urban Shocker; Myles Thomas	Catchers: Benny Bengough; Pat Collins; Johnny Grabowski; Infielders: Joe Dugan; Mike Gazella; Lou Gehrig; Mark Koenig; Tony Lazzeri; Ray Morehart; Julie Wera	Outfielders: Earle Combs; Cedric Durst; Bob Meusel; Ben Paschal; Babe Ruth	Manager: Miller Huggins; Coaches: Art Fletcher; Charley O'Leary

== Player stats ==
= Indicates team leader

= Indicates league leader

=== Batting ===
==== Starters by position ====
Note: Pos = Position; G = Games played; AB = At bats; H = Hits; Avg. = Batting average; HR = Home runs; RBI = Runs batted in

Pos	Player	G	AB	H	Avg.	HR	RBI
C	Pat Collins	92	251	69	.275	7	36
1B	Lou Gehrig	155	584	218	.373	47	173
2B	Tony Lazzeri	153	570	176	.309	18	102
3B	Joe Dugan	112	387	104	.269	2	43
SS	Mark Koenig	123	526	150	.285	3	62
OF	Earle Combs	152	648	231	.356	6	64
OF	Babe Ruth	151	540	192	.356	60	165
OF	Bob Meusel	135	516	174	.337	8	103

==== Other batters ====
Note: G = Games played; AB = At bats; H = Hits; Avg. = Batting average; HR = Home runs; RBI = Runs batted in

Player	G	AB	H	Avg.	HR	RBI
Johnny Grabowski	70	195	54	.277	0	25
Ray Morehart	73	195	50	.256	1	20
Cedric Durst	65	129	32	.248	0	25
Mike Gazella	54	115	32	.278	0	9
Benny Bengough	31	85	21	.247	0	10
Ben Paschal	50	82	26	.317	2	16
Julie Wera	38	42	10	.238	1	8

=== Pitching ===
==== Starting pitchers ====
Note: G = Games pitched; IP = Innings pitched; W = Wins; L = Losses; ERA = Earned run average; SO = Strikeouts

Player	G	IP	W	L	ERA	SO
Waite Hoyt	36	256.1	22	7	2.63	86
Herb Pennock	34	209.2	19	8	3.00	51
Urban Shocker	31	200.0	18	6	2.84	35
Dutch Ruether	27	184.0	13	6	3.38	45
George Pipgras	29	166.1	10	3	4.11	81

==== Other pitchers ====
Note: G = Games pitched; IP = Innings pitched; W = Wins; L = Losses; ERA = Earned run average; SO = Strikeouts; SV = Saves

Player	G	IP	W	L	ERA	SO	SV
Wilcy Moore	50	213.0	19	7	2.28	75	13
Myles Thomas	21	88.2	7	4	4.87	25	1

==== Relief pitchers ====
Note: G = Games pitched; W = Wins; L = Losses; SV = Saves; ERA = Earned run average; SO = Strikeouts

Player	G	W	L	SV	ERA	SO
Bob Shawkey	19	2	3	4	2.89	23
Joe Giard	16	0	0	0	8.00	10
Walter Beall	1	0	0	0	9.00	0

== 1927 World Series ==
Game	Date	Visitor	Score	Home	Score	Record (NYY-PIT)	Attendance
1	October 5	New York Yankees	5	Pittsburgh Pirates	4	1–0	41,467
2	October 6	New York Yankees	6	Pittsburgh Pirates	2	2–0	41,634
3	October 7	Pittsburgh Pirates	1	New York Yankees	8	3–0	60,695
4	October 8	Pittsburgh Pirates	3	New York Yankees	4	4–0	57,909
New York Yankees win 4–0

== Awards and honors ==
- Lou Gehrig, AL MVP Award

Since a voter could select only one player per team, two good candidates from the same team could find their votes split and both of their chances of winning hurt. In addition, the clause prohibiting repeat winners led to unusual results like Babe Ruth's 1927 (one of the greatest offensive seasons of all time) not being eligible for the award. As The New York Times wrote in 1925, "[T]he purpose, of course, is to pass the honor around, but the effect is to pass an empty honor around."

=== League leaders ===
- Babe Ruth, Major League Baseball home run champion (60)
- Earle Combs, American League leader, triples (23)
- Lou Gehrig, American League RBI champion (175)

=== Franchise records ===
- Earle Combs, Yankees single season record, triples in a season (23)

== In popular culture ==
In 2016, ESPN announced 1927: The Diary of Myles Thomas, part of a new genre of storytelling known as "real-time historical fiction." The core of the project is a historical novel in the form of a diary of Myles Thomas, written by Douglas Alden, complemented by a wealth of fact-based content from the season, all published along the same timeline as the events unfolded almost 90 years ago. Through Myles Thomas's diary entries, additional essays and real-time social-media components (including Twitter) "re-living" that famous Yankees season, the goal is to explore the rarefied nexus of baseball, jazz and Prohibition — defining elements of the remarkable world that existed in 1927. The diary runs the length of the full 1927 season, from April 13 through October 10, 1927.
