= Tony Welzer =

German baseball player (1899–1971)

- Pitcher
- Born: April 5, 1899; German Empire
- Died: March 18, 1971 (aged 71); Milwaukee, Wisconsin, U.S.
- Batted: Right Threw: Right

MLB debut
- April 13, 1926, for the Boston Red Sox

Last MLB appearance
- September 21, 1927, for the Boston Red Sox

MLB statistics
- Win–loss record: 10–14
- Earned run average: 4.78
- Strikeouts: 85
- Stats at Baseball Reference

Teams
- Boston Red Sox (1926–1927)

Anton Frank Welzer (April 5, 1899 – March 18, 1971) was a pitcher in Major League Baseball who played from 1926 through 1927 for the Boston Red Sox. Listed at 5' 11", 160 lb., he batted and threw right-handed.

Welzer, the third German to play for the Red Sox, entered in the majors as a member of the hapless Red Sox teams that lost 107 games in 1926 and 103 in 1927. His 4–3 mark in his rookie season represented the only winning record in the Boston pitching staff. A year later he went 6–11, ending third behind Slim Harriss (14–21) and Hal Wiltze (10–18), as nobody on the team had a winning record.

Welzer gave up the 43rd, 45th and 46th home runs of Babe Ruth's record-setting 60 during a single week of the 1927 New York Yankees season.

In a two-season career, Welzer posted a 10–14 record with 85 strikeouts and a 4.78 ERA in 76 appearances, including 25 starts, nine complete games, one shutout, and 310 2/3 innings of work.

Welzer died at the age of 71 in Milwaukee, Wisconsin.
