= Ray Morehart =

American baseball player (1899–1989)

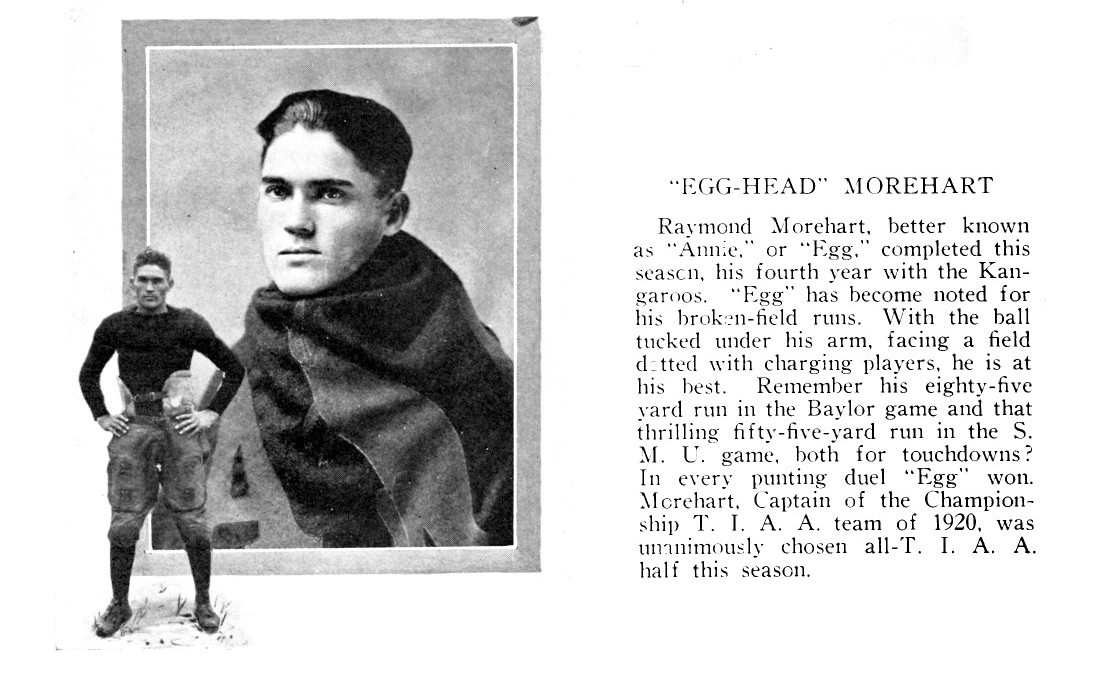
- 1922 Austin College yearbook photo
- Shortstop / Second baseman
- Born: December 2, 1899; Terrell, Texas, U.S.
- Died: January 13, 1989 (aged 89); Dallas, Texas, U.S.
- Batted: Left Threw: Right

MLB debut
- August 9, 1924, for the Chicago White Sox

Last MLB appearance
- September 29, 1927, for the New York Yankees

MLB statistics
- Batting average: .269
- Home runs: 1
- Hits: 131
- Runs batted in: 49
- Stats at Baseball Reference

Teams
- Chicago White Sox (1924, 1926); New York Yankees (1927)

Career highlights and awards
- World Series champion (1927)

Raymond Anderson Morehart (December 2, 1899 – January 13, 1989) was an American Major League Baseball player.

A four-sport (baseball, basketball, football and track and field) star at Austin College in Sherman, Texas, a scout for the Chicago White Sox offered Morehart a deal in February 1922. Otto Powell, the owner and president of the Flint Vehicles of the Michigan–Ontario League, sold Morehart's contract to the White Sox in August 1924. Morehart made his debut in a doubleheader against the New York Yankees on August 10, collecting his first major league hit in the second game. As a rookie with Chicago, Morehart set a record with nine hits during a doubleheader.

In January 1927, the White Sox traded Morehart and catcher Johnny Grabowski to the New York Yankees for infielder Aaron Ward in a straight no-cash deal. Morehart was a member of the 1927 New York Yankees, a team often considered the greatest ever. The Yankees released Morehart and pitcher Joe Giard on December 30, 1927 and sold their contracts to the St. Paul Saints of the American Association. After several seasons in the minor leagues, Morehart retired in 1933 and became the Athletic Director at Austin College that April.

Morehart died after a brief illness at his home in Dallas, Texas on January 13, 1989 at the age of 89. At the time of his death, he was one of two remaining players for the 1927 Yankees, along with Mark Koenig, following the passing of George Pipgras in 1986.

== Bibliography ==
- Nemec, David (2004). The Baseball Rookies Encyclopedia. Brassey's. ISBN 1-57488-670-3.
- Stout, Glenn (2002). Yankees Century: 100 Years of New York Yankees Baseball. Houghton Mifflin Books. ISBN 0-618-08527-0.
