= Johnny Grabowski =

American baseball player (1900–1946)

- Catcher
- Born: January 7, 1900; Ware, Massachusetts, U.S.
- Died: May 23, 1946 (aged 46); Albany, New York, U.S.
- Batted: Right Threw: Right

MLB debut
- July 11, 1924, for the Chicago White Sox

Last MLB appearance
- September 21, 1931, for the Detroit Tigers

MLB statistics
- Batting average: .252
- Home runs: 3
- Runs batted in: 86
- Stats at Baseball Reference

Teams
- Chicago White Sox (1924–1926); New York Yankees (1927–1929); Detroit Tigers (1931)

Career highlights and awards
- 2× World Series champion (1927, 1928)

John Patrick Grabowski (January 7, 1900 – May 23, 1946) was an American professional baseball player. He played 12 years from 1922 to 1933, including seven years as a catcher in Major League Baseball with the Chicago White Sox (1924–1926), New York Yankees (1927–1929), and Detroit Tigers (1931). He was a member of the 1927 and 1928 New York Yankees teams that won consecutive World Series championships. Grabowski was one of a number of American athletes in the first half of the 20th century to be nicknamed "Nig", being referred to as such in newspaper reports as early as October 1924.

== Early years ==
Grabowski was born in Ware, Massachusetts, in 1900 to a family of Polish descent.

== Professional baseball ==
Grabowski began his professional baseball career in 1922 with the St. Joseph Saints, then spent 1923 and 1924 with the Minneapolis Millers of the American Association. He was traded to the Chicago White Sox in July 1924 and made his major league debut that month. Grabowski played for the White Sox for three years, from 1924 to 1926, appearing in 89 games, 78 of them as a catcher. One of the games Grabowski caught was Ted Lyons' no-hitter on August 21, 1926.

In January 1927, the White Sox traded Grabowski to the New York Yankees. He had his best season for the 1927 "Murderer's Row" New York Yankees, considered by some to be the best baseball team in history. Grabowski appeared in 70 games for the 1927 Yankees, sharing the catching duty with Pat Collins and Benny Bengough in 1927. Grabowski had a .350 on-base percentage for the 1927 Yankees. He remained with the Yankees through the 1929 season and won two World Series championships with the Yankees in 1927 and 1928.

After spending 1930 with the St. Paul Saints, Grabowski returned to the major leagues in 1931 with the Detroit Tigers. He appeared in 40 games with the Tigers, 39 as a catcher. He appeared in his last major league game in September 1931. In seven major league seasons, Grabowski appeared in 296 games, 282 as a catcher, and compiled a career .252 batting average and .295 on-base percentage.

Grabowski concluded his playing career playing for the Montreal Royals of the International League in 1932 and 1933.

== Later years ==
After retiring as a player, Grabowski became an umpire in the Canadian–American League (1937), Eastern League (1938–1939), and International League (1940–1941). Grabowski's home in Guilderland, New York caught fire on May 19, 1946. His wife and him were trapped in the fire, the latter when he tried to get his car from the garage before the house fire spread. Grabowski suffered first-degree and second-degree burns in the garage when it caught fire. His wife, Lorraine Grabowski, suffered less serious burns from the blaze. Both were taken to St. Peter's Hospital in Albany, New York, where the former catcher's prognosis was described as "poor". He died of his injuries at St. Peter's Hospital on May 23, age 46.
