= Tony Lazzeri =

American baseball player (1903–1946)

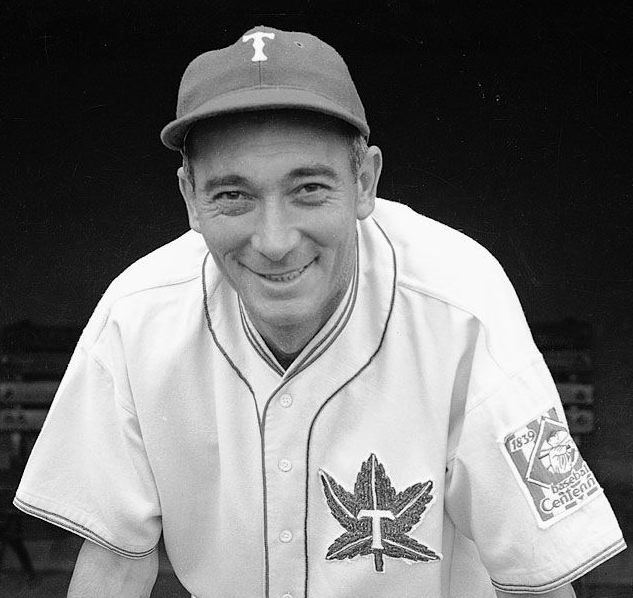
- Second baseman
- Born: December 6, 1903; San Francisco, California, U.S.
- Died: August 6, 1946 (aged 42); San Francisco, California, U.S.
- Batted: Right Threw: Right

MLB debut
- April 13, 1926, for the New York Yankees

Last MLB appearance
- June 7, 1939, for the New York Giants

MLB statistics
- Batting average: .292
- Home runs: 178
- Runs batted in: 1,191
- Stats at Baseball Reference

Teams
- New York Yankees (1926–1937); Chicago Cubs (1938); Brooklyn Dodgers (1939); New York Giants (1939)

Career highlights and awards
- All-Star (1933); 5× World Series champion (1927, 1928, 1932, 1936, 1937)

Member of the National

Baseball Hall of Fame
- Induction: 1991
- Election method: Veterans Committee

Anthony Michael Lazzeri (December 6, 1903 – August 6, 1946) was an American professional baseball second baseman during the 1920s and 1930s, predominantly with the New York Yankees of Major League Baseball (MLB). He was part of the famed "Murderers' Row" Yankee batting lineup of the late 1920s (including the 1927 team), along with Babe Ruth, Lou Gehrig, and Bob Meusel.

Lazzeri was born and raised in San Francisco, California. He dropped out of school to work with his father as a boilermaker, but at the age of 18, began to play baseball professionally. After playing in minor league baseball from 1922 through 1925, Lazzeri joined the Yankees in 1926. He was a member of the original American League All-Star team in 1933. He was nicknamed "Poosh 'Em Up" by Italian-speaking fans, from a mistranslation of an Italian phrase meaning to "hit it out" (hit a home run).

Lazzeri is one of only 14 major league baseball players to hit for the natural cycle (hitting a single, double, triple and home run in sequence) and the only player to complete a natural cycle with a grand slam. He also holds the American League record for the most RBI in a single game, with 11 on May 24, 1936. In that same 1936 game, he became the first major league player to hit two grand slams in one game. Lazzeri was posthumously inducted into the National Baseball Hall of Fame by the Veterans Committee in 1991.

== Early life ==
Lazzeri was born on December 6, 1903, to Augustine and Julia Lazzeri, who had emigrated from Italy. They lived in the Cow Hollow district of San Francisco. Augustine worked as a boilermaker.

At age 15, Lazzeri was expelled from school. He began to work with his father, earning $4.50 a day ($94 in current dollar terms). Lazzeri also played semi-professional baseball and trained to become a prizefighter.

== Minor league career ==
A friend of Lazzeri convinced Duffy Lewis, who managed the Salt Lake City Bees of the Pacific Coast League (PCL), to allow Lazzeri to try out for the team in 1922. Lazzeri made the team, earning $250 a month ($4,696 in current dollar terms) as a utility infielder. He batted .192 in 45 games, and was demoted to the Peoria Tractors of the Illinois–Indiana–Iowa League in 1923 to gain more experience.

Lazzeri batted .248 with 14 home runs in 135 games for Peoria, before being recalled to Salt Lake City. Starting at shortstop for the Bees in 1924, Lazzeri batted .285 with 16 home runs. However, Lewis gave the starting shortstop role to Pinky Pittenger, and sent Lazzeri to the Lincoln Links of the Western League, where he batted .329 with 28 home runs in 82 games.

Returning to Salt Lake City under new manager Oscar Vitt in 1925, Lazzeri batted .355 with 60 home runs and 222 runs batted in (RBIs), the most RBIs in professional baseball history. That year he became one of what are today four Pacific Coast League hitters to have had a 30 home runs, 30 stolen bases season, along with Joc Pederson (2014), Frank Demaree (1934), and Lefty O'Doul (1927). Though Salt Lake City had a working agreement with the Chicago Cubs, the Cubs passed on Lazzeri due to his epilepsy. The Cincinnati Reds passed on Lazzeri as well. Bill Essick, a scout for the New York Yankees, convinced Ed Barrow, the Yankees' general manager, to sign Lazzeri. Barrow agreed after receiving confirmatory reports from other scouts, including Ed Holly and Paul Krichell, as well as ensuring that Lazzeri's insurance policy would cover his illness.

== New York Yankees ==
After the 1925 season, Barrow purchased Lazzeri from Salt Lake City in exchange for the rights to Frank Zoeller and Mack Hillis and $50,000 ($896,490 in current dollar terms). Lazzeri signed a contract with the Yankees worth $5,000 ($89,649 in current dollar terms).

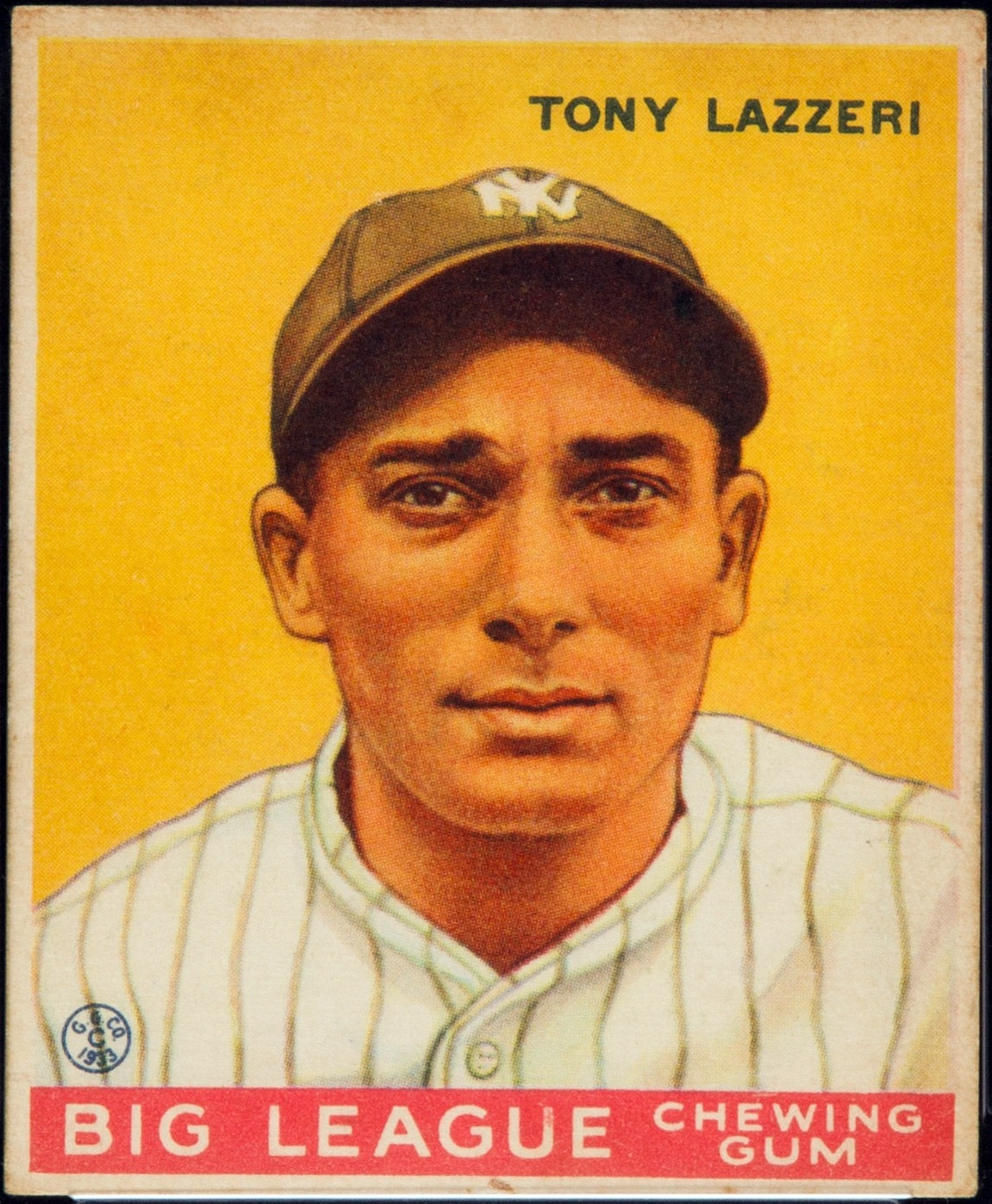
1933 baseball card

Lazzeri debuted in the major leagues in 1926 as a member of the Yankees. Manager Miller Huggins moved Lazzeri from shortstop to second base. Huggins paired Lazzeri with Mark Koenig, also a rookie, as his double play combination. In his rookie season, playing all 155 games, Lazzeri hit 18 home runs and had 114 RBIs. He finished third in the American League (AL) in home runs behind Babe Ruth and Al Simmons, and tied for third in RBIs with George Burns, trailing only Ruth. The Yankees reached the 1926 World Series, losing to the St. Louis Cardinals. In a bases loaded situation in the seventh inning of the deciding game, Grover Cleveland Alexander struck out Lazzeri to save the series for the Cardinals.

With the 1927 Yankees, known as "Murderer's Row" due to the strength of their batting lineup, Lazzeri batted .309 with 18 home runs and 102 RBIs. He finished third in the AL in home runs, behind only teammates Ruth and Lou Gehrig. The Yankees finished the season with a 110–44 win–loss record, and defeated the Pittsburgh Pirates in the 1927 World Series. Baseball experts solicited by Billy Evans named Lazzeri the consensus best second baseman in the AL. He incurred a muscle injury that threatened to end his season. Nevertheless, Lazzeri returned to the team, and hit a key double off of Alexander in the 1928 World Series, which the Yankees won. Despite the games he missed, Lazzeri tied Joe Judge for third place in Most Valuable Player voting, with the award being won by Mickey Cochrane.

Lazzeri had his career-high batting average of .354 in 1929. He hit two home runs for the Yankees in their 1932 World Series victory. In 1933, Lazzeri was named to appear in the first MLB All-Star Game, representing the AL against the National League (NL). He had a knee injury during the 1934 season.

Lazzeri set an AL single-game record on May 24, 1936, when he recorded eleven RBIs. That month, he also set records for most home runs in three consecutive games (6) and four consecutive games (7). He hit a grand slam during the 1936 World Series, only the second grand slam in World Series history. Lazzeri scored the deciding run in the 1937 World Series, as the Yankees defeated the New York Giants.

As a member of the Yankees through 1937, he averaged 79 runs, 14 home runs, 96 RBIs and 12 stolen bases, including seven seasons with over 100 RBI and five seasons batting .300 or higher (including a high of .354 in 1929). During this period, the Yankees won six American League pennants (1926, 1927, 1928, 1932, 1936 and 1937) and five World Series championships (1927, 1928, 1932, 1936 and 1937).

== Later career ==
The Yankees released Lazzeri following the 1937 season. He signed with the Cubs as a player-coach for the 1938 season. Though he received little playing time, the Cubs won the NL championship and appeared in the 1938 World Series against the Yankees, which the Yankees won. The Cubs released Lazzeri after the season, and he signed with the Brooklyn Dodgers for the 1939 season. However, the Dodgers released him on May 13, after he batted .282 in 14 games. The next day, Lazzeri signed with the New York Giants, to replace George Myatt and Lou Chiozza at third base. Lazzeri received his release on June 7.

Lazzeri then returned to minor league baseball, where he managed the Class-AA Toronto Maple Leafs of the International League for the remainder of the 1939 season and entire 1940 season.

He played for the San Francisco Seals of the PCL in 1941, and was released after the season.

He played for and managed the Portsmouth Cubs of the Piedmont League in 1942.

Lazzeri served as player-manager of the Wilkes-Barre Barons of the Class-AA Eastern League in 1943, posting a .271 batting average in 58 games. However, he was asked to resign after that season.

== Personal life ==
Before the 1923 season, Lazzeri married Maye Janes. The couple had one child, David Anthony Lazzeri (1931–2013).

== Death ==
Lazzeri died in 1946 at age 42 from a fall the coroner said was caused by a heart attack in his Millbrae, California home. However, today, many believe Lazzeri's fall was caused by an epileptic seizure rather than a heart attack.

== Legacy ==
Although his offensive production was overshadowed by the historic accomplishments of teammates such as Babe Ruth, Lou Gehrig and Joe DiMaggio, Lazzeri is still considered one of the top hitting second basemen of his era. Koenig considered Lazzeri the team's most valuable player. He finished his career with a .292 batting average, 986 runs, 178 home runs, 1,191 RBI and 148 stolen bases. Despite his hitting 60 home runs in an extended PCL season in 1925, Lazzeri never hit more than 18 home runs in a major league season (a mark he reached four times).

Lazzeri holds the American League record for most RBIs in a game with 11, set May 24, 1936, as he also became the first major league player to hit two grand slams in one game. He holds the major league record of 15 RBIs in consecutive games (one more than Rudy York in 1946 and Sammy Sosa in 2002). He also set major league records of six home runs in three consecutive games, and seven in four consecutive games. Lazzeri continues to share the consecutive-game American League record, but the three-game record was topped by Shawn Green of the Dodgers (seven in 2002) and the four-game mark was broken by Ralph Kiner of the Pittsburgh Pirates (eight in 1947). Lazzeri is also the only player in major league baseball to hit a natural cycle with the final home run being a grand slam on June 3, 1932.

The Veterans Committee elected Lazzeri to the National Baseball Hall of Fame in 1991.

== See also ==
- List of Major League Baseball career triples leaders
- List of Major League Baseball runs batted in records
- List of Major League Baseball career runs batted in leaders
- List of Major League Baseball players to hit for the cycle
- List of Major League Baseball hitters with two grand slams in one game
- Bay Area Sports Hall of Fame
- List of members of the Italian American Sports Hall of Fame

Preceded by Babe Herman	Hitting for the cycle June 3, 1932	Succeeded by Mickey Cochrane
