= Cedric Durst =

American baseball player (1896–1971)

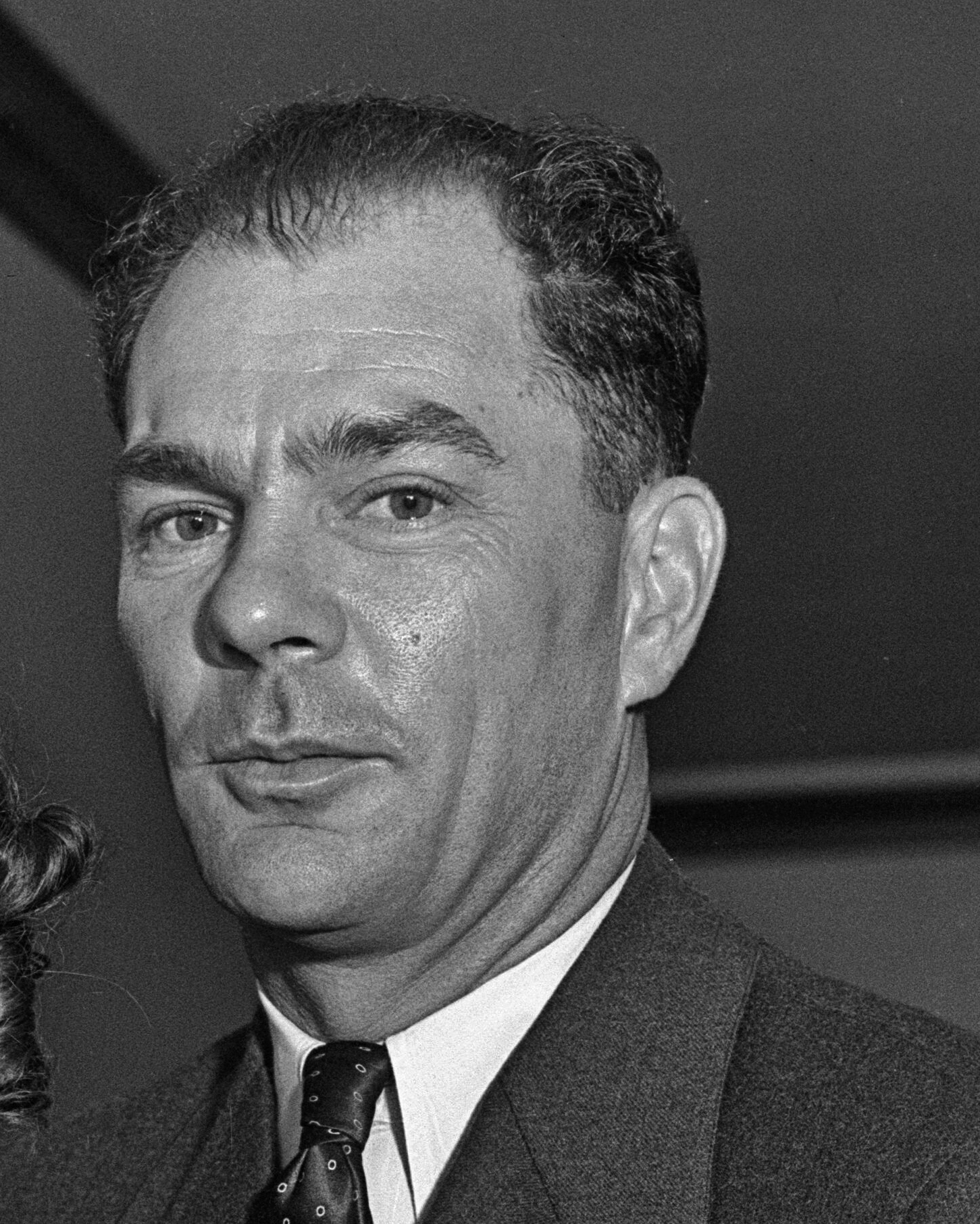
- Outfielder
- Born: August 23, 1896; Austin, Texas, U.S.
- Died: February 16, 1971 (aged 74); San Diego, California, U.S.
- Batted: Left Threw: Left

MLB debut
- May 30, 1922, for the St. Louis Browns

Last MLB appearance
- September 25, 1930, for the Boston Red Sox

MLB statistics
- Batting average: .244
- Home runs: 15
- Runs batted in: 122
- Stats at Baseball Reference

Teams
- St. Louis Browns (1922–1923, 1926); New York Yankees (1927–1930); Boston Red Sox (1930)

Career highlights and awards
- 2× World Series champion (1927, 1928)

Cedric Montgomery Durst (August 23, 1896 – February 16, 1971) was an American outfielder in Major League Baseball who played between 1922 and 1930 for the St. Louis Browns (1922–1923, 1926), New York Yankees (1927–1930) and Boston Red Sox (1930). Listed at 5ft 11in and 160 pounds (73 kg), Durst batted and threw left-handed. He was born in Austin, Texas.

Though he was always regarded as a fine defensive player, Durst was a weak hitter almost every year in his major league career. He played in parts of three seasons with the Browns before joining the Yankees. While in New York, Durst was a member of the 1927 and 1928 World Champion Yankees, playing exclusively as a reserve outfielder for Earle Combs (CF), Bob Meusel (LF) and Babe Ruth (RF). During the 1930 midseason, he was sent by New York to the Red Sox in exchange for Red Ruffing. The 1930 season proved to be Durst's last year in the majors.

In a seven-season career, Durst was a .244 hitter (269-for-1103) with 15 home runs and 122 RBI in 481 games, including 146 runs, 39 doubles, 17 triples, and seven stolen bases. In five postseason games, he hit .333 (3-for-9) with one home run, two RBI and three runs.

After his major league career was over, Durst played and managed in the minor leagues for two more decades. After drawing his release from the Red Sox, he played regularly for the St. Paul Saints (American Association) in 1931 and 1932, and with the Hollywood Stars and San Diego Padres in the Pacific Coast League for six more seasons. The best of his PCL seasons was 1933, when he played 180 games for Hollywood, batting .318 with 14 home runs. During the 1936 season at San Diego, his roommate was future superstar Ted Williams. Durst managed the Padres from 1939 to 1943.

After leaving baseball, Durst worked as a guard at Convair Aircraft in San Diego, eventually becoming chief of Convair's police force.

Durst suffered a stroke during a golf tournament in the San Carlos neighborhood of San Diego, California on February 14, 1971. He died on February 16 at Mercy Hospital, aged 74.
