= Walter Beall =

American baseball player

- Pitcher
- Born: July 29, 1899; Washington, D.C., U.S.
- Died: January 28, 1959 (aged 59); Suitland, Maryland, U.S.
- Batted: Right Threw: Right

MLB debut
- September 3, 1924, for the New York Yankees

Last MLB appearance
- June 12, 1929, for the Washington Senators

MLB statistics
- Win–loss record: 5–5
- Earned run average: 4.43
- Strikeouts: 85
- Stats at Baseball Reference

Teams
- New York Yankees (1924–1927); Washington Senators (1929)

Walter Esau Beall (July 29, 1899 – January 28, 1959) was an American baseball player who played for the New York Yankees on several championship teams in the 1920s.

Born in Washington, D.C., Beall was a standout pitcher in the minor leagues before his contract was sold by the Rochester Red Wings of the International League to the New York Yankees in August 1924 for $50,000. He was used sparingly at the major league level, usually in relief. He made appearances with the Yankees from 1924 through 1927, and was a member of the 1927 New York Yankees, a team often considered the greatest ever—though he only pitched one inning that year (May 30 against the Philadelphia Athletics). That was Beall's final appearance as a Yankee; two years later, he appeared in three games for the Washington Senators to close out his major league career.

Beall is remembered as having one of the greatest curveballs in the history of baseball, though his lack of control prevented him from becoming a great pitcher. Teammate Babe Ruth noted that Beall possessed the "greatest curveball I ever saw."

Beall died in Suitland, Maryland on January 28, 1959.
