= Joe Giard =

American baseball player (1898-1956)

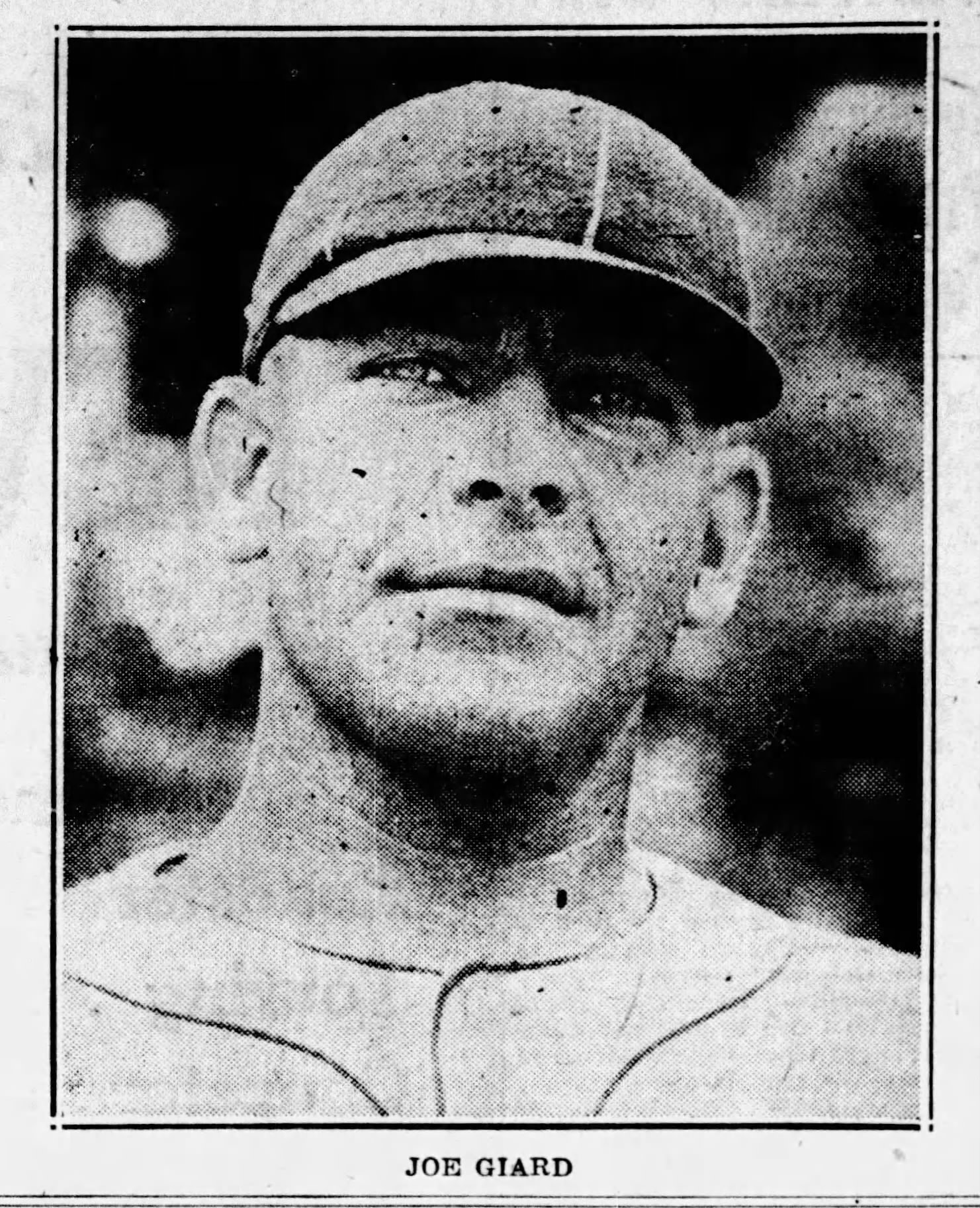
- Giard in 1925
- Pitcher
- Born: October 7, 1898; Ware, Massachusetts, U.S.
- Died: July 10, 1956 (aged 57); Worcester, Massachusetts, U.S.
- Batted: Left Threw: Left

MLB debut
- April 18, 1925, for the St. Louis Browns

Last MLB appearance
- September 25, 1927, for the New York Yankees

MLB statistics
- Wins: 13
- Losses: 15
- Earned run average: 5.96
- Stats at Baseball Reference

Teams
- St. Louis Browns (1925–1926); New York Yankees (1927)

Joseph Oscar Giard (October 7, 1898 – July 10, 1956) was an American Major League Baseball pitcher.

Born in Ware, Massachusetts, Giard played two seasons for the St. Louis Browns, chiefly as a starter, before being traded (along with outfielder Cedric Durst) for pitcher Sad Sam Jones in February 1927; Giard was therefore a member of the 1927 New York Yankees, a team often considered the greatest ever. He pitched 27 innings in 16 games, all in relief, for the Yankees that year, with an ERA of 8.00.

Giard died in Worcester, Massachusetts, on July 10, 1956.
