= Bob Meusel =

American baseball player (1896–1977)

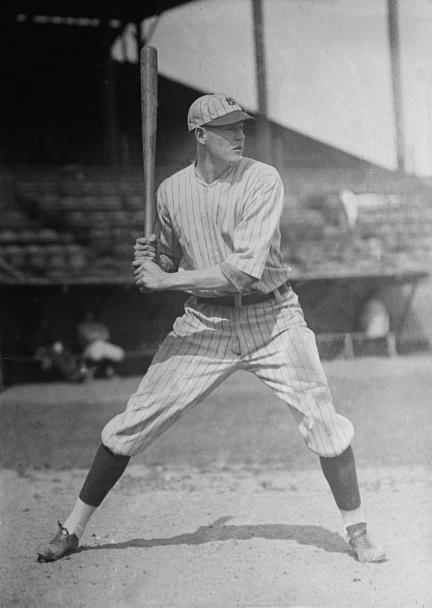
- Meusel in 1921
- Outfielder
- Born: July 19, 1896; San Jose, California, U.S.
- Died: November 28, 1977 (aged 81); Bellflower, California, U.S.
- Batted: Right Threw: Right

MLB debut
- April 14, 1920, for the New York Yankees

Last MLB appearance
- September 26, 1930, for the Cincinnati Reds

MLB statistics
- Batting average: .309
- Home runs: 156
- Runs batted in: 1,071
- Stats at Baseball Reference

Teams
- New York Yankees (1920–1929); Cincinnati Reds (1930)

Career highlights and awards
- 3× World Series champion (1923, 1927, 1928); AL home run leader (1925); AL RBI leader (1925)

Robert William Meusel (July 19, 1896 – November 28, 1977) was an American professional baseball player. A left and right fielder, he played in Major League Baseball (MLB) for eleven seasons from 1920 through 1930, all but the last for the New York Yankees. He was best known as a member of the Yankees' championship teams of the 1920s, nicknamed "Murderers' Row", during which time the team won its first six American League (AL) pennants and first three World Series titles.

Meusel, noted for his strong outfield throwing arm, batted fifth behind Baseball Hall of Famers Babe Ruth and Lou Gehrig. In 1925, he became the second Yankee, after Ruth, to lead the AL in home runs (33), runs batted in (138) and extra base hits (79). Nicknamed "Long Bob" because of his 6-foot, 3 inch (1.91 m) stature, Meusel batted .313 or better in seven of his first eight seasons, finishing with a .309 career average; his 1,009 RBI during the 1920s were the fourth most by any major leaguer, and trailed only Harry Heilmann's total of 1,131 among AL right-handed hitters. Meusel ended his career in 1930 with the Cincinnati Reds. He hit for the cycle three times, and was the second of six major leaguers to accomplish this feat as many as three times during a career.

His older brother, Emil "Irish" Meusel, was a star outfielder in the National League (NL) during the same period, primarily for the New York Giants.

== Early life ==
Meusel was born in San Jose, California, the youngest of Charlie and Mary Meusel's six children. At an early age he moved to Los Angeles, where he attended Los Angeles High School. Meusel started his career with the Vernon Tigers of the Pacific Coast League in 1917. He joined the US Navy during World War I and played for the Navy baseball team. He went back to the Tigers for the 1919 season, batting .330. He also played third base in the minors.

On December 14, 1921, Meusel married Edith Cowan, with whom he had two children.

== Professional career ==
Meusel's contract was purchased by the New York Yankees in early 1920. After a productive spring training, Meusel replaced future Hall of Famer Frank Baker at third base. He played his first game on April 14, 1920. In his rookie season, Meusel had a .328 batting average with 11 home runs and 83 runs batted in over 119 games. He finished fourth in the league in doubles with 41 while sharing time with Duffy Lewis in left field.

In the 1921 season, Meusel started in 149 out of 154 games, primarily playing right field. He batted .318, finishing second in the league in home runs with 24 and third in the league with 136 runs batted in. He hit for the cycle in a win against the Washington Senators on May 7. In the second game of a September 5 doubleheader, he tied a major league record for outfielders (previously accomplished by nine others) by recording four assists. He broke a club record and tied Jack Tobin of the St. Louis Browns for the league lead in outfield assists with 28; he was considered to be one of the league's best all-around players. Meusel's brother, Irish, was acquired by the New York Giants from the Philadelphia Phillies mid-season, and helped lead the Giants to the pennant. The two brothers played against each other in the 1921 World Series, where the Giants faced their tenants (the Yankees played their home games in the Polo Grounds, the ball park owned by the Giants). Bob Meusel stole home in Game 3 of the Series. He doubled in Babe Ruth for the winning run in Game 5 for a one-game lead, but the Yankees lost the next three games and the Series (the last best-of-nine in World Series history). His batting average in those eight games was a mere .200.

At the same time, Meusel, Bill Piercy, and Ruth signed up to play in a barnstorming tour. It was a violation of baseball rules at the time, and Meusel and Ruth had previously been warned about playing with the tour. As punishment, Commissioner of Baseball Kenesaw Mountain Landis suspended them for the first five weeks of the 1922 season and fined them their World Series cash share of $3,362 ($64,667 today) each. That season Meusel only played in 121 games, hitting .319 with 16 home runs and 84 runs batted in as he gradually shifted to left field to allow Ruth to instead play right field. Meusel occasionally played right field in Yankees games away from home to protect Ruth from the sun, as the sun affected Ruth's skill as an outfielder. Despite the games he missed, he again led the AL in assists with 24. He hit for the cycle for the second time of his career in a win against the Detroit Tigers on July 21. The Yankees won the American League pennant for the second year in a row, but they were again beaten by the Giants, this time in five games. Meusel had the highest batting average of the Yankees at the end of the Series with .300.

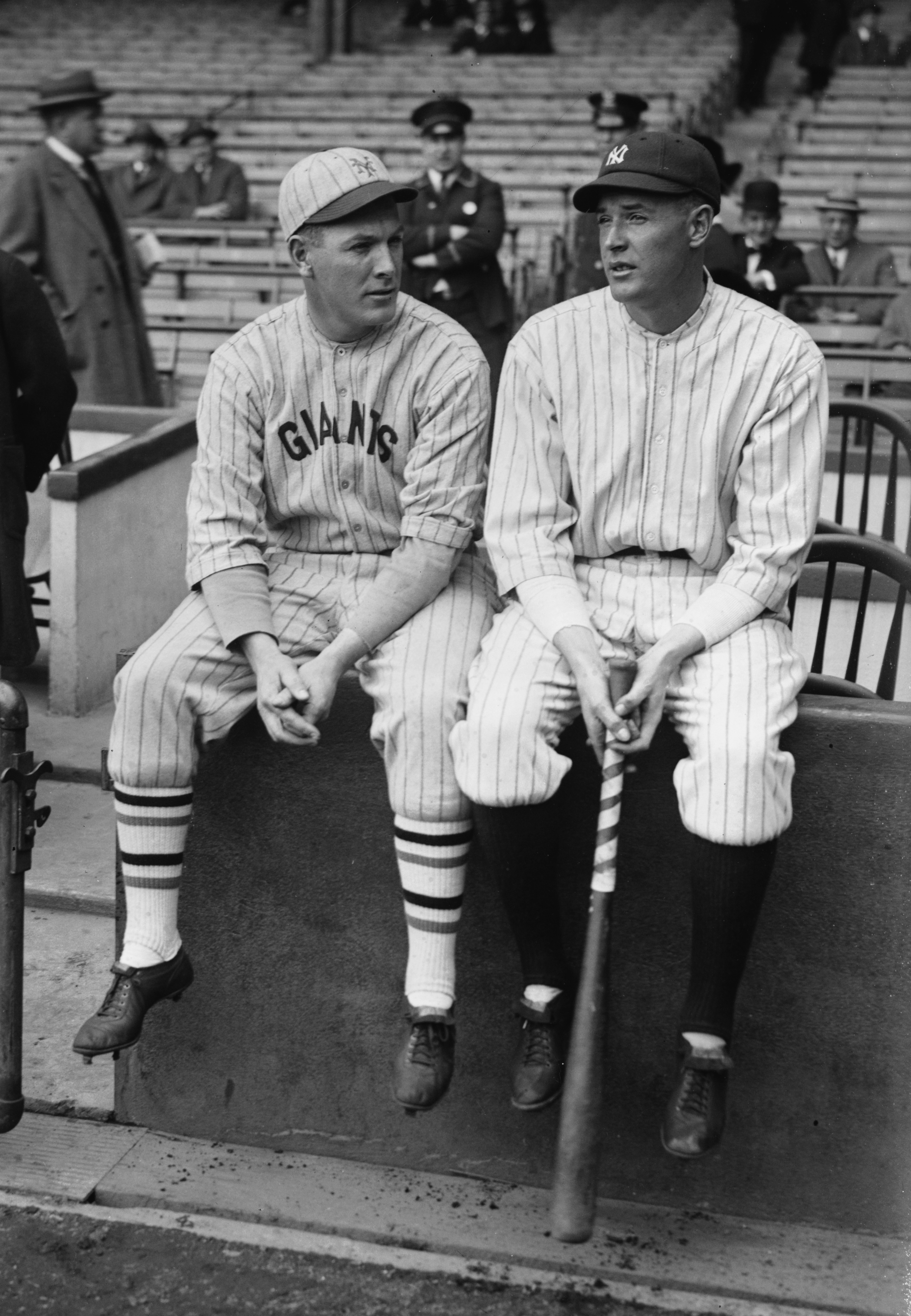
Bob Meusel (right) with his brother, outfielder Emil "Irish" Meusel

In 1923, Meusel hit .313 with 9 home runs and 91 runs batted in as the Yankees moved into their new Yankee Stadium. Meusel helped lead the team to their first World Series title, in their third consecutive matchup with the Giants. Meusel had the most runs batted in (eight) of any player in the Series. He hit a two-run triple in the second inning to help the Yankees win Game 4 at the Polo Grounds, drove in five runs in Game 5 and had a key two-run single that gave the Yankees the lead for good in Game 6. The 1923 World Series marked the third consecutive year that Bob played against his brother Irish in the World Series. This made them the first set of brothers to play against each other on opposing teams in a World Series or any Big Four championship series.

Before the 1924 season started, Meusel's close friend Tony Boeckel, shortstop for the Boston Braves, was killed when the car in which he was riding flipped over in San Diego. Meusel was a passenger in the vehicle but escaped unhurt. That year Meusel hit .325 with 12 home runs and 124 runs batted in, playing in 143 games. In a game against the Tigers on June 13, Meusel was involved in one of the most notorious brawls in baseball history. With the Yankees leading 10–6 in the top of the ninth inning, Ty Cobb, the star and manager of the Tigers, gave pitcher Bert Cole the signal to hit Meusel with a pitch. Ruth saw the signal and warned Meusel, who was hit in the back and rushed to fight Cole. Both teams rushed onto the field to brawl, and Cobb and Ruth started fighting as well. Over a thousand fans also rushed onto the field, and a riot erupted. The police managed to control the brawl and arrested several fans. The umpire of the game, Billy Evans, pushed Meusel and Ruth out of Navin Field to safety. American League President Ban Johnson punished Meusel and Cole by fining them and issuing a ten-day suspension.

Meusel had a breakout year in 1925. He led the American League in home runs (33), runs batted in (134), games played (156) and extra base hits (79). Despite this, he finished merely tied for 18th position overall for the AL's Most Valuable Player award, far behind winner (and former Yankee) Roger Peckinpaugh of the Washington Senators. The Yankees had their worst season of the decade, finishing seventh in the league with a 69–85 record. In the following 1926 season, Meusel only played in 108 games, batting .315 with 12 home runs and 81 runs batted in. In the 1926 World Series against the St. Louis Cardinals, Meusel dropped a key fly ball with one out and the bases loaded in the fourth inning of Game 7, allowing the Cardinals to tie the game 1–1; the next batter singled to drive in two more runs. Meusel had two opportunities to redeem himself later in the game, but he made infield outs in both the fifth and seventh innings, each time with two men on base. In the bottom of the ninth inning, with New York trailing 3–2, Cardinals starting pitcher Grover Cleveland Alexander retired the first two batters and then walked Ruth. Meusel was up to bat when Ruth tried to steal second base, and catcher Bob O'Farrell threw him out, ending both the game and the Series; Meusel only hit .238.

Meusel was a key member of the 1927 New York Yankees team. That season Meusel played in 135 games, hitting .337 with 8 home runs and 103 runs batted in, and finished second in the league with 24 stolen bases; on May 16 he stole second, third and home in one game. In the 1927 World Series, Meusel batted only .118 and broke the record for the most strikeouts in a four-game series with seven, but the Yankees swept the Pittsburgh Pirates in four games. In 1928 Meusel played in 131 games, hitting .297 with 11 home runs and 113 runs batted in. He hit for the cycle a record-tying third time on July 26 against the Tigers. The Yankees reached the World Series for the third year in a row, playing the Cardinals in a rematch from two years previously. In Game 1 of the Series, Meusel hit the only home run in his World Series career as the Yankees won the game and went on to sweep the series 4–0.

Prior to the start of the 1930 season, the Yankees sold Meusel to the Cincinnati Reds, and he played in 110 games, hitting .289 with 10 home runs and 62 runs batted in. The Reds released Meusel after the season, and he went on to the Minneapolis Millers of the American Association where he played the 1931 season, hitting .283. He went back to the Pacific Coast League in 1932, where he played 64 games with the Hollywood Stars, batting .329 with four home runs before retiring. Meusel's major league career ended with 368 doubles, 95 triples, 156 home runs, a .497 slugging percentage, 1,071 runs batted in, 826 runs scored and 143 stolen bases.

== Retirement and death ==
After retiring from baseball, Meusel worked as a security guard at a US Navy base for 15 years. He was in attendance at Yankee Stadium when his former teammate Lou Gehrig made his famous "Luckiest Man on the Face of the Earth" speech on July 4, 1939. He also appeared in the 1942 film The Pride of the Yankees, as well as the 1948 film The Babe Ruth Story, as himself in a cameo role.

Meusel lived in California following his playing career, first in Redondo Beach, and then in Downey. He died in Bellflower in 1977 and was buried at Rose Hills Memorial Park in Whittier.

== Legacy ==
Meusel received the most recognition for being a member of the "Murderers' Row" teams of the mid-1920s, which included Ruth, Gehrig, second baseman Tony Lazzeri and center fielder Earle Combs. He shares the record for the most times hitting for the cycle with three, tying the mark set by Long John Reilly in 1890; Babe Herman later tied the mark in 1933; 82 years later, Adrián Beltré also achieved the feat in 2015, along with Trea Turner in 2021. Meusel had one of the strongest arms of the era; in his obituary, The New York Times called his throwing arm "deadly accurate". Hall of Fame manager Casey Stengel, who played on the 1921 through 1923 Giants teams, said that he had never seen a better thrower.

Harvey Frommer described Meusel as a heavy drinker and womanizer who did not get along with his teammates. His manager Miller Huggins called him "indifferent". He was quiet and reserved, rarely giving newspaper interviews until his career was winding down. He was also known for his lazy attitude, such as refusing to run out ground balls, which many said kept him from achieving greatness.

Meusel was considered for election to the Baseball Hall of Fame by its Veterans Committee in 1982, but the committee instead selected former commissioner Happy Chandler and former Giants shortstop Travis Jackson in its balloting.

In 1925, Meusel joined Philadelphia Athletics outfielder Tilly Walker (1918), St. Louis Browns outfielder Ken Williams (1922) and later Gehrig (1931) as the only players other than Ruth to win the AL home run title between 1918 and 1931. Both Walker and Gehrig won the title jointly with Ruth while Williams and Meusel won the title individually.

== See also ==
- List of Major League Baseball career runs batted in leaders
- List of Major League Baseball annual runs batted in leaders
- List of Major League Baseball annual home run leaders
- List of Major League Baseball players to hit for the cycle

Achievements
| Preceded by Bobby Veach; Ray Schalk; Bill Terry | Hitting for the cycle May 7, 1921; July 3, 1922; July 26, 1928 | Succeeded by Dave Bancroft; Pie Traynor; Mel Ott |
