= Slim Harriss =

American baseball player (1897–1963)

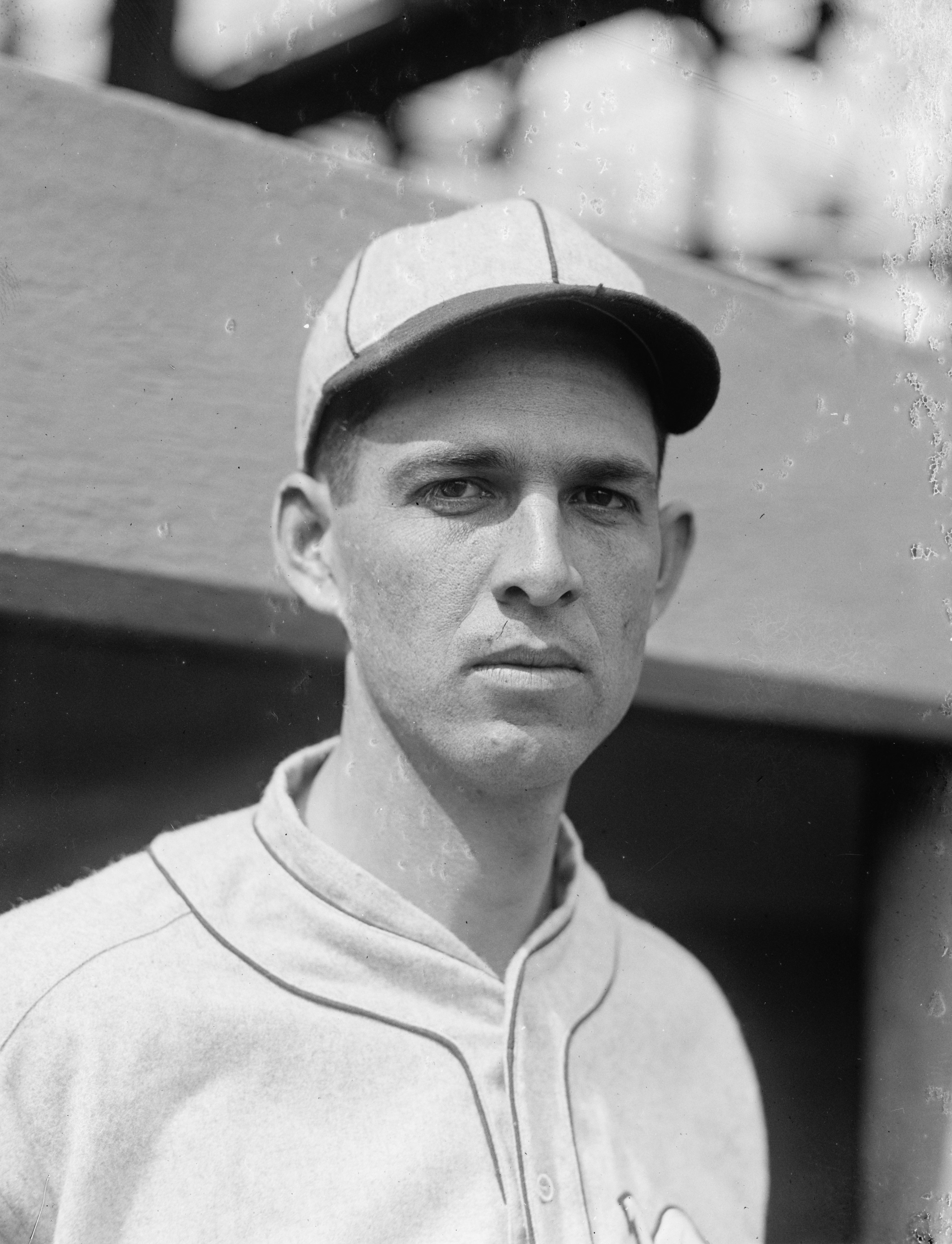
- Pitcher
- Born: December 11, 1897; Brownwood, Texas, U.S.
- Died: September 19, 1963 (aged 65); Temple, Texas, U.S.
- Batted: Right Threw: Right

MLB debut
- April 19, 1920, for the Philadelphia Athletics

Last MLB appearance
- September 29, 1928, for the Boston Red Sox

MLB statistics
- Win–loss record: 95–135
- Earned run average: 4.25
- Strikeouts: 644
- Stats at Baseball Reference

Teams
- Philadelphia Athletics (1920–1926); Boston Red Sox (1926–1928)

William Jennings Bryan "Slim" Harriss (Note: Harriss's draft registration card of February 1942 lists his legal name as William Bryan Harriss and his place of birth as Brown County, Texas.) (December 11, 1897 – September 19, 1963) was an American professional baseball pitcher. He played in Major League Baseball (MLB) during the 1920s for the Philadelphia Athletics and Boston Red Sox.

== Biography ==
Harriss was born in 1897 in Brownwood, Texas. He studied at Howard Payne College Academy, but did not attend college.

A tall, lanky hurler, Harriss entered the majors in 1920 with the Philadelphia Athletics, playing for them six-and-a-half seasons before joining the Boston Red Sox and playing for them for two-and-a-half seasons. He led the American League in losses twice, with 20 in 1922 and 21 in 1927. His most productive season came with the 1925 Athletics, when he recorded career-highs with 19 wins, a 3.49 ERA, and 252 2/3 innings pitched. During the 1926 midseason, he was sent by the Athletics along Fred Heimach and Baby Doll Jacobson to the Red Sox in the same transaction that brought Tom Jenkins and Howard Ehmke to Philadelphia. That year, he became the last pitcher (through the end of the 2019 season) to throw more than 150 innings in a season without allowing a single home run. In 1928, he led the hapless pitching staff of Boston with 14 wins and 77 strikeouts.

In a nine-season career, Harriss posted a 95–135 record with 644 strikeouts and a 4.26 ERA in 349 appearances, including 228 starts, 89 complete games, seven shutouts, 78 games finished, 16 saves, and 1750 1/3 innings of work.

As of February 1942, Harriss was living in Bangs, Texas, and working as a farmer. He died in Temple, Texas, in September 1963 at age 65.
