= Hal Wiltse =

American baseball player (1903–1983)

- Pitcher
- Born: August 6, 1903; Clay City, Illinois, U.S.
- Died: November 2, 1983 (aged 80); Bunkie, Louisiana, U.S.
- Batted: Left Threw: Left

MLB debut
- April 13, 1926, for the Boston Red Sox

Last MLB appearance
- April 20, 1931, for the Philadelphia Phillies

MLB statistics
- Win–loss record: 20–40
- Earned run average: 4.87
- Strikeouts: 134
- Stats at Baseball Reference

Teams
- Boston Red Sox (1926–1928); St. Louis Browns (1928); Philadelphia Phillies (1931)

Harold James Wiltse (August 6, 1903 – November 2, 1983) nicknamed "Whitey", was a professional baseball pitcher. He played all or part of four seasons in Major League Baseball between 1926 and 1931 for the Boston Red Sox (1926–28), St. Louis Browns (1928) and Philadelphia Phillies (1931). Listed at 5 ft 9 in (1.75 m), 168 lb., Wiltse batted and threw left-handed. He was born in Clay City, Illinois.

Wiltse, nicknamed "Whitey", posted a 20–40 record with 134 strikeouts and a 4.87 ERA in 102 appearances, including 65 starts, 23 complete games, two shutouts, one save, and 500 1/3 innings pitched during his major league career. He also had an extensive minor league baseball career, spanning fifteen seasons from 1923 until 1937.

Wiltse died at the age of 80 in Bunkie, Louisiana.
