= George Pipgras =

American baseball player (1899–1986)

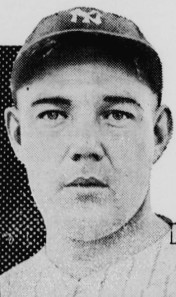
- Pitcher
- Born: December 20, 1899; Ida Grove, Iowa, U.S.
- Died: October 19, 1986 (aged 86); Gainesville, Florida, U.S.
- Batted: Right Threw: Right

MLB debut
- June 9, 1923, for the New York Yankees

Last MLB appearance
- June 2, 1935, for the Boston Red Sox

MLB statistics
- Win–loss record: 102–73
- Earned run average: 4.09
- Strikeouts: 714
- Stats at Baseball Reference

Teams
- New York Yankees (1923–1924, 1927–1933); Boston Red Sox (1933–1935)

Career highlights and awards
- 4× World Series champion (1923, 1927, 1928, 1932); AL wins leader (1928)

George William Pipgras (December 20, 1899 – October 19, 1986) was an American right-handed starting pitcher and umpire in Major League Baseball.

Known as "The Danish Viking", he spent most of his playing career with the New York Yankees, breaking in as a rookie in 1923. He spent the 1925 and 1926 seasons in the minor leagues, and became a starter in the rotation for the first time with the legendary 1927 team. Pipgras lead the American League in wins with a 24–13, 3.38 ERA record for the following year's 1928 repeat champions.

After ending his 11-year career with the Boston Red Sox, he became an AL umpire from 1938 to 1946, and was the umpire behind the plate in one of baseball's most dramatic wins ever: on September 30, 1945, at Sportsman's Park in St. Louis, when Hank Greenberg hit a ninth-inning grand slam, after Pipgras suggested to Greenberg the game should be called on account of darkness. However, Greenberg convinced him he could still see the ball, so the game proceeded. The next pitch was hit over the fence and the Detroit Tigers went on to win the pennant and eventually the 1945 World Series over the Chicago Cubs 4–3 in 7 games.

His younger brother Ed pitched briefly for the 1932 Brooklyn Dodgers.

== Pitching career ==
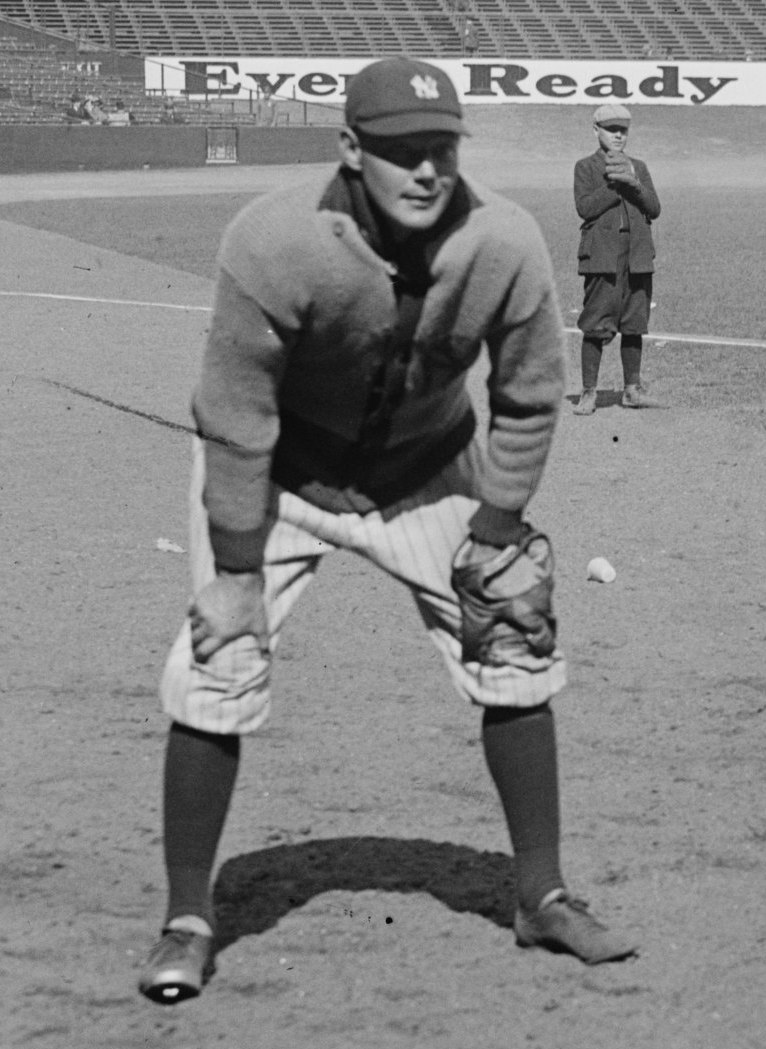
Pipgras with the Yankees in 1923

Pipgras was born in Ida Grove, Iowa, and served in World War I with the 25th Army Engineers.

He started his major league career with the Yankees in the 1923 season after being acquired from the Red Sox, making 17 appearances in his first two years. After returning to the minor leagues for two more years, he earned a place in the starting rotation in 1927, posting a 10–3 record for the team still considered by many to be the greatest ever, and winning Game 2 of the 1927 World Series against the Pittsburgh Pirates. In 1928 he led AL pitchers in wins with a 24–13 record, and also in games started (38) and innings pitched (300 2/3), while finishing second in strikeouts (139); he followed up with another Game 2 victory in the 1928 World Series against the St. Louis Cardinals as New York swept the NL champions for the second straight year. He was 18–12 as the Yankees slipped to second place in 1929, and 15–15 in 1930 with an AL-leading 3 shutouts. After a 7–6 season in 1931, he bounced back with a 16–7 mark for the 1932 AL champions, and again won his World Series start in Game 3 as the Yankees swept the Chicago Cubs. In that game, Babe Ruth and Lou Gehrig each hit a pair of home runs, including Ruth's renowned "Called Shot." In May 1933, Pipgras' contract was sold back to the Red Sox, and he was 9–8 for the team that year before making a handful of appearances in 1934 and 1935. In an eleven-season career, he posted a 102–73 record with 714 strikeouts and a 4.09 earned run average in 1488 1/3 innings.

== Umpire and scout ==
On August 4, 1938, Eastern League President Thomas Richardson announced that they sold the contract of Pipgras to the American League and President Will Harridge. Pipgras would be required to report to Chicago to begin his umpiring duties.

On Opening Day at Yankee Stadium on April 20, 1939, Pipgras worked as the third base umpire during a Red Sox-Yankees contest. The historic box score included the names of future Hall of Famers Joe Cronin, Bill Dickey, Joe DiMaggio, Bobby Doerr, Jimmie Foxx, Lefty Grove, Red Ruffing, Lou Gehrig, Joe Gordon and prize rookie Ted Williams as well. Pipgras was the starting pitcher for the Yankees in 1929's Opening Day, and his opponent for the Red Sox that day was Ruffing. According to historians, the unusual feat set by Pipgras is a case unique in major league history. He went on to umpire in the 1944 World Series, as well as the 1940 All-Star Game; he was the home plate umpire for Dick Fowler's no-hitter on September 9, 1945.

Pipgras retired as an umpire in May 1946 due to illness. In December, the Red Sox announced that they hired Pipgras and Mace Brown as scouts.

== Death ==
Pipgras had been in poor health in December 1985 when a doctor took care of him at his residence. On October 4, 1986, Pipgras went to a local hospital in Inverness, Florida and on October 14, relocated to the United States Department of Veterans Affairs hospital in Gainesville, Florida. Pipgras died on October 19, 1986 at the age of 86 in the hospital. At the time of his death, he was one of three living members of the 1927 New York Yankees with Mark Koenig and Ray Morehart. His wife, Mattie Mae, died on November 23, 2013 at the age of 99.

== See also ==
- List of Major League Baseball annual wins leaders
