= 1928 World Series =

1928 Major League Baseball championship series

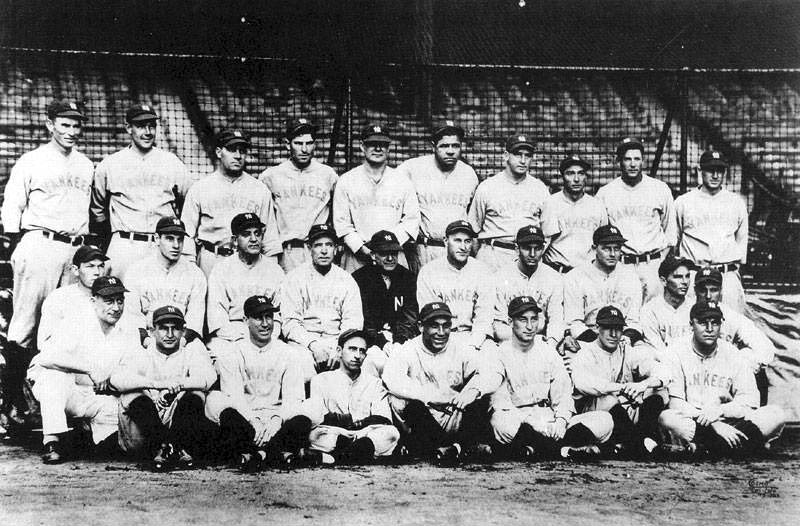
- New York Yankees, champions
Team (Wins)	Managers	Season
New York Yankees (4)	Miller Huggins	101–53, .656, GA: 2 1/2
St. Louis Cardinals (0)	Bill McKechnie	95–59, .617, GA: 2
- Dates: October 4–9
- Venue(s): Yankee Stadium (New York); Sportsman's Park (St. Louis)
- Umpires: Brick Owens (AL), Cy Rigler (NL), Bill McGowan (AL), Cy Pfirman (NL)
- Hall of Famers: Umpire: Bill McGowan; Yankees: Miller Huggins (mgr.); Earle Combs; Leo Durocher‡ Lou Gehrig; Waite Hoyt; Tony Lazzeri; Herb Pennock; Babe Ruth; Cardinals: Bill McKechnie (mgr.); Grover Cleveland Alexander; Jim Bottomley; Frankie Frisch; Chick Hafey; Jesse Haines; Rabbit Maranville ‡ Elected as a manager

Broadcast
- Radio: NBC; CBS
- Radio announcers: NBC: Graham McNamee and Phillips Carlin; CBS: J. Andrew White and Ted Husing

The 1928 World Series was the championship series in Major League Baseball for the 1928 season. The 25th edition of the World Series, it was a best-of-seven playoff that matched the American League (AL) champion New York Yankees versus the National League (NL) champion St. Louis Cardinals. The Yankees beat the Cardinals in four games to win their third championship and become the first team to do back-to-back sweeps.

Babe Ruth hit .625 (10 for 16) as the Yankees outscored their opponents by a combined score of 27–10. As he had done against the Cards in the 1926 Series, Ruth hit three home runs over the right field pavilion in Sportsman's Park in Game 4, the only player to do it in two different World Series through the 2025 season. Unlike in 1926, however, it occurred in the final game of a Series won by the Yanks and finished off their two consecutive World Series sweeps. Ruth also set a Series record by collecting ten hits in four games, a feat not matched until Jackson Chourio did it for the Milwaukee Brewers in 2026.

Lou Gehrig also had a good Series, hitting .545 (6 for 11) with four home runs. He drove in as many runs by himself (9) as the entire Cardinal team combined. His OPS of 2.433 is, through 2025, the highest World Series OPS of all time.

Bill McKechnie became the second manager to lead two different teams to the World Series, and like Pat Moran before him, won one and lost one.

== Background ==
Before the series started, Walter Johnson, a retired Major League pitcher at the time, reportedly predicted that the Cardinals would "make short work of the New York Yankees," and that the Yankees "(hadn't) looked good for a while." Both Cardinals and Yankees fans were looking forward to a rematch of the 1926 World Series, which the Cardinals won.

== Summary ==
AL New York Yankees (4) vs. NL St. Louis Cardinals (0)

Game	Date	Score	Location	Time	Attendance
1	October 4	St. Louis Cardinals – 1, New York Yankees – 4	Yankee Stadium	1:49	61,426
2	October 5	St. Louis Cardinals – 3, New York Yankees – 9	Yankee Stadium	2:04	60,714
3	October 7	New York Yankees – 7, St. Louis Cardinals – 3	Sportsman's Park	2:00	39,602
4	October 9	New York Yankees – 7, St. Louis Cardinals – 3	Sportsman's Park	2:25	37,331

== Matchups ==
=== Game 1 ===
October 4, 1928 1:30 pm (ET) at Yankee Stadium in Bronx, New York
Team	1	2	3	4	5	6	7	8	9	R	H	E
St. Louis	0	0	0	0	0	0	1	0	0	1	3	1
New York	1	0	0	2	0	0	0	1	X	4	7	0
WP: Waite Hoyt (1–0) LP: Bill Sherdel (0–1); Home runs: STL: Jim Bottomley (1); NYY: Bob Meusel (1)

In a fashion similar to 1926, Bill Sherdel took the mound in Game 1 for the Cardinals.

Ruth doubled with 2 outs in the first inning. Gehrig followed with an RBI double. Ruth lashed another double in the fourth and scored ahead of Bob Meusel's home run, one of only four hits off Sherdel in his seven innings. Consecutive singles by Mark Koenig, Ruth and Gehrig-for his second RBI-against Cards reliever Syl Johnson gave the Yankees the 4th run and a 1–0 series lead.

=== Game 2 ===
October 5, 1928 1:30 pm (ET) at Yankee Stadium in Bronx, New York
Team	1	2	3	4	5	6	7	8	9	R	H	E
St. Louis	0	3	0	0	0	0	0	0	0	3	4	1
New York	3	1	4	0	0	0	1	0	X	9	8	2
WP: George Pipgras (1–0) LP: Grover Cleveland Alexander (0–1); Home runs: STL: None; NYY: Lou Gehrig (1)

The Cardinals produced 30 percent (3) of their runs in the Series in the second inning of game 2.

George Harper walked, Jimmie Wilson doubled, Rabbit Maranville singled, and Grover Cleveland Alexander reached on second baseman Tony Lazzeri's errant throw. It tied the game at 3–3.

After that, George Pipgras allowed only two more Cardinal hits, walking 3 other St. Louis batters. Miller Huggins had helped him straighten out a delivery problem. Pipgras consistently struck out the Cardinals with his curveballs, and they didn't score again.

New York went ahead 4–3 in the bottom of the second inning off Alexander, who did not do well after that. Ruth led off with a single. Gehrig, having homered earlier (in the first inning to give the Yankees a 3–0 lead), drew a walk, and Meusel drove in a run with a double.

A hit batsman and another run-scoring hit gave the Yankees a 4-run lead, and that was how it ended.

=== Game 3 ===
October 7, 1928 1:30 pm (CT) at Sportsman's Park in St. Louis, Missouri
Team	1	2	3	4	5	6	7	8	9	R	H	E
New York	0	1	0	2	0	3	1	0	0	7	7	2
St. Louis	2	0	0	0	1	0	0	0	0	3	9	3
WP: Tom Zachary (1–0) LP: Jesse Haines (0–1); Home runs: NYY: Lou Gehrig 2 (3); STL: None

The Redbirds, as the Cardinals were affectionately called by fans, led only 3 times the entire series and held an advantage in this game for 3 innings, the longest span in the series. They put up a 2–0 score in the 1st inning on singles by Andy High and Frankie Frisch, followed by a line drive that center fielder Cedric Durst couldn't catch, giving Jim Bottomley a 2-run double.

The only other St. Louis run came in the 5th inning, when Taylor Douthit was hit by a pitch and scored to make it a 3–3 game on High's double.

Where the Cardinals had to scrape together runs, the Yankees did not. Gehrig homered into the right-field pavilion. In the fourth inning, Ruth laced a single and Gehrig followed with a hard line drive that skipped over the head of charging fielder Douthit. The ball rolled to the fence, and Gehrig went around the bases for a two-run inside-the-park homer.

Ruth took to the bases again in the sixth inning when his grounder forced out Koenig. Gehrig then drew a walk. 3rd baseman High fielded Meusel's bouncer and tried to start a double play. His throw got Gehrig at second, but Frisch's relay went wild and rolled to the fence. As Bottomley scampered after the ball, Ruth rounded third base and headed for home. The throw beat him, and umpire Bill McGowan called him out, but the impact from Ruth's hit in the collision jarred the ball loose from catcher Jimmie Wilson, and McGowan changed the call.

Later in the inning, Meusel scored on a double steal. The Yankees scored another run that inning to make it 6–3. Another run in the seventh was their last of the game, making it 7-3.

=== Game 4 ===
October 9, 1928 1:30 pm (CT) at Sportsman's Park in St. Louis, Missouri
Team	1	2	3	4	5	6	7	8	9	R	H	E
New York	0	0	0	1	0	0	4	2	0	7	15	2
St. Louis	0	0	1	1	0	0	0	0	1	3	11	0
WP: Waite Hoyt (2–0) LP: Bill Sherdel (0–2); Home runs: NYY: Babe Ruth 3 (3), Lou Gehrig (4), Cedric Durst (1); STL: None

After Game 3, Cardinals manager Bill McKechnie was still hopeful, despite losing 3 games in a row. "It[sic] they can win three games, so can we. Nothing is impossible. And this thing isn't over until the fourth game is won," he was quoted as saying.

The Cards led 2–1 in the top of the seventh. 21-game-winning southpaw Will Sherdel had an 0–2 count on Babe Ruth, who turned to say something to catcher Earl Smith. Seizing what he thought was a great opportunity to end the at-bat, Sherdel "quick-pitched", or threw without a windup, for what he thought was strike three on the Babe. "Quick pitches" were legal in the National League, but not in the American League or the World Series. So NL plate umpire Cy Pfirman called "no pitch", causing a vociferous argument with the Cardinals. Ruth then took two balls to even the count at 2–2 before homering to tie the game at two apiece. Gehrig's ensuing back-to-back home run, his fourth of the Series, gave the Yanks a lead they never relinquished. They scored twice more in the seventh, and Ruth finished the inning off with his third homer of the game in the two-run Yankee eighth. (Note: This was Ruth's second three home run game in the World Series, following Game 4 of the 1926 World Series and he was, as of 2012, the only player to hit three home runs in two World Series games.)

St. Louis scored a lone run in the bottom of the ninth to make it 7–3, but that was their last, as future Hall of Famer Frankie Frisch hit a left field foul fly caught on the run by none other than the Babe Ruth up against the stands, as angry Cardinal fans swatted him with newspapers and programs. But Ruth merely kept running right into the dugout, holding the ball in the air and giving the Yankees their second straight World Series sweep.

In 1930, Ruth called this game the biggest thrill of his career.

== Composite line score ==
1928 World Series (4–0): New York Yankees (A.L.) over St. Louis Cardinals (N.L.)

Team	1	2	3	4	5	6	7	8	9	R	H	E
New York Yankees	4	2	4	5	0	3	6	3	0	27	37	6
St. Louis Cardinals	2	3	1	1	1	0	1	0	1	10	27	5
Total attendance: 199,072 Average attendance: 49,768; Winning player's share: $5,813 Losing player's share: $4,181

== Broadcast ==
Since 1922, World Series games were broadcast by radio. The announcers for this years Series were Graham McNamee and Phillips Carlin for NBC's radio network. For CBS, J. Andrew White and Ted Husing.

== See also ==
- List of World Series sweeps
