= 1925 Detroit Tigers season =

Major League Baseball season

1925 Detroit Tigers
- League: American League
- Ballpark: Navin Field
- City: Detroit, Michigan
- Record: 81–73 (.526)
- League place: 4th
- Owners: Frank Navin
- Managers: Ty Cobb

The 1925 Detroit Tigers season was a season in American baseball. The team finished fourth in the American League with a record of 81–73-2, 16½ games behind the Washington Senators.

== Regular season ==
=== Events ===
- May 5, 1925: Ty Cobb hit three home runs in one game in a 14–8 victory over the St. Louis Browns.

=== Season standings ===
American League
Team	W	L	Pct.	GB	Home	Road
Washington Senators	96	55	.636	—	53‍–‍22	43‍–‍33
Philadelphia Athletics	88	64	.579	8½	51‍–‍26	37‍–‍38
St. Louis Browns	82	71	.536	15	45‍–‍32	37‍–‍39
Detroit Tigers	81	73	.526	16½	43‍–‍34	38‍–‍39
Chicago White Sox	79	75	.513	18½	44‍–‍33	35‍–‍42
Cleveland Indians	70	84	.455	27½	37‍–‍39	33‍–‍45
New York Yankees	69	85	.448	28½	42‍–‍36	27‍–‍49
Boston Red Sox	47	105	.309	49½	28‍–‍47	19‍–‍58

=== Record vs. opponents ===
1925 American League record Sources:
Team	BOS	CWS	CLE	DET	NYY	PHA	SLB	WSH
Boston	—	9–13	7–15	5–17	9–13	5–17	5–16	7–14
Chicago	13–9	—	14–8	13–9	13–9	8–14	9–13	9–13
Cleveland	15–7	8–14	—	11–11–1	10–12	11–11	11–11	4–18
Detroit	17–5	9–13	11–11–1	—	14–8–1	8–14	12–10	10–12
New York	13–9	9–13	12–10	8–14–1	—	9–13	11–11–1	7–15
Philadelphia	17–5	14–8	11–11	14–8	13–9	—	12–10	7–13–1
St. Louis	16–5	13–9	11–11	10–12	11–11–1	10–12	—	11–11
Washington	14–7	13–9	18–4	12–10	15–7	13–7–1	11–11	—

=== Roster ===
1925 Detroit Tigers
Roster
Pitchers: Ownie Carroll; Bert Cole; Rip Collins; Hooks Dauss; Jess Doyle; Ken Holloway; Syl Johnson; Dutch Leonard; Bill Moore; Lil Stoner; Ed Wells; Earl Whitehill	Catchers: Johnny Bassler; Oscar Stanage; Larry Woodall; Infielders: Lu Blue; Les Burke; Charlie Gehringer; Fred Haney; Bob Jones; Johnny Neun; Frank O'Rourke; Topper Rigney; Jackie Tavener; Jack Warner	Outfielders: Ty Cobb; Bob Fothergill; Harry Heilmann; Heinie Manush; Al Wingo; Other batters: Andy Harrington	Manager: Ty Cobb; Coaches: George McBride; Otto Williams

== Player stats ==
=== Batting ===
==== Starters by position ====
Note: Pos = Position; G = Games played; AB = At bats; H = Hits; Avg. = Batting average; HR = Home runs; RBI = Runs batted in

Pos	Player	G	AB	H	Avg.	HR	RBI
C	Johnny Bassler	121	344	96	.279	0	52
1B	Lu Blue	150	532	163	.306	3	94
2B	Frank O'Rourke	124	482	141	.293	5	57
SS	Jackie Tavener	134	453	111	.245	0	47
3B	Fred Haney	114	398	111	.279	0	40
OF	Harry Heilmann	150	573	225	.393	13	134
OF	Al Wingo	130	440	163	.370	5	68
OF	Ty Cobb	121	415	157	.378	12	102

==== Other batters ====
Note: G = Games played; AB = At bats; H = Hits; Avg. = Batting average; HR = Home runs; RBI = Runs batted in

Player	G	AB	H	Avg.	HR	RBI
Heinie Manush	99	278	84	.302	5	47
Bob Fothergill	71	204	72	.353	2	28
Les Burke	77	180	52	.289	0	24
Larry Woodall	75	171	35	.205	0	13
Bob Jones	50	148	35	.236	0	15
Topper Rigney	62	146	36	.247	2	18
Johnny Neun	60	75	20	.267	0	4
Jack Warner	10	39	13	.333	0	2
Charlie Gehringer	8	18	3	.167	0	0
Oscar Stanage	3	5	1	.200	0	0
Andy Harrington	1	1	0	.000	0	0

=== Pitching ===
==== Starting pitchers ====
Note: G = Games pitched; IP = Innings pitched; W = Wins; L = Losses; ERA = Earned run average; SO = Strikeouts

Player	G	IP	W	L	ERA	SO
Earl Whitehill	35	239.1	11	11	4.66	83
Hooks Dauss	35	228.0	16	11	3.16	58
Rip Collins	26	139.0	6	11	4.60	33
Dutch Leonard	18	125.2	11	4	4.51	65

==== Other pitchers ====
Note: G = Games pitched; IP = Innings pitched; W = Wins; L = Losses; ERA = Earned run average; SO = Strikeouts

Player	G	IP	W	L	ERA	SO
Ken Holloway	38	157.2	13	4	4.62	29
Lil Stoner	34	152.0	10	9	4.26	51
Ed Wells	36	135.1	6	9	6.18	45
Ownie Carroll	10	40.2	2	2	3.76	12

==== Relief pitchers ====
Note: G = Games pitched; W = Wins; L = Losses; SV = Saves; ERA = Earned run average; SO = Strikeouts

Player	G	W	L	SV	ERA	SO
Jess Doyle	45	4	7	8	5.93	31
Bert Cole	14	2	3	1	5.88	7
Ty Cobb	1	0	0	0	0.00	0
Bill Moore	1	0	0	0	inf	0

== Farm system ==
Level	Team	League	Manager
A	Fort Worth Panthers	Texas League	Jake Atz
C	Wheeling Stogies	Middle Atlantic League	Arthur Rooney and Frank Eastley

LEAGUE CHAMPIONS: Fort Worth
