= 1921 Detroit Tigers season =

Major League Baseball season

1921 Detroit Tigers
- League: American League
- Ballpark: Navin Field
- City: Detroit, Michigan
- Record: 71–82 (.464)
- League place: 6th
- Owners: Frank Navin
- Managers: Ty Cobb

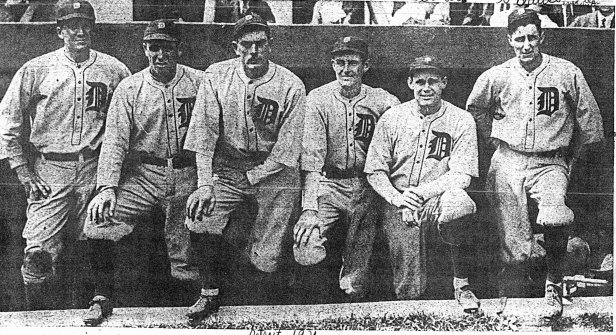
1921 Detroit Tigers (left to right): Bassler, Bush, Veach, Cole, Leonard, and Dauss

The 1921 Detroit Tigers finished in sixth place in the American League, 27 games behind the Yankees, with a record of 71–82. Despite their sixth-place finish, the 1921 Tigers amassed 1,724 hits and a team batting average of .316—the highest team hit total and batting average in American League history. Detroit outfielders Harry Heilmann and Ty Cobb finished No. 1 and No. 2 in the American League batting race with batting averages of .394 and .389, and all three Detroit outfielders (Heilmann, Cobb, and Bobby Veach) ranked among the league leaders in batting average and RBIs. As early proof of the baseball adage that "Good Pitching Beats Good Hitting", the downfall of the 1921 Tigers was the absence of good pitching. The team ERA was 4.40, they allowed nine or more runs 28 times, and only one pitcher (Dutch Leonard) had an ERA below 4.24.

== The Players ==
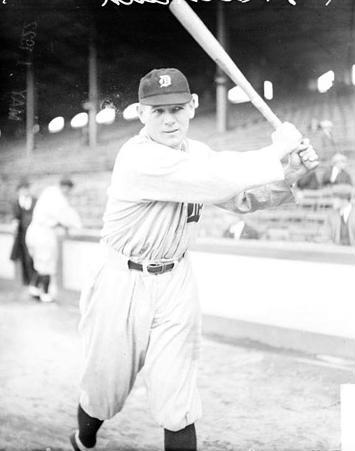
1921 AL batting champ Harry Heilmann

=== Catcher: Johnny Bassler ===
Catcher Johnny Bassler had a career on-base percentage of .416 in nine major league seasons, the second highest all time among major league catchers. He was considered the best catcher in baseball from 1921 to 1925, finishing in the top seven in the American League MVP voting three straight years: 6th in 1922, 7th in 1923, and 5th in 1924. Bassler was an outstanding offensive and defensive player. Baseball historian Bill James wrote that, "if his major league career wasn't so short he would rank among the top 20 catchers of all time." Because of the brevity of his major league career, James ranked Bassler as the 47th best catcher of all time. Bassler was a career .304 hitter who walked 437 times, while striking out only 81 times. That is a ratio of 5.4 walks per strikeout – one of the highest in major league history. His 1925 total of 57.3 at bats per strikeout is one of the highest in American League history.

=== Infield: Blue, Young, Bush, Jones and Flagstead ===
First baseman Lu Blue was a switch-hitter who had a career on-base percentage of .402. The 1921 season was Blue's first in the major leagues, and he hit .308 with a .416 on-base percentage and 131 runs scored. Blue was the Tigers' starting first baseman from 1921 to 1927, hitting above .300 four times, including a .311 season in 1924. He finished among the top vote getters in the American League Most Valuable Player voting three times for the Tigers: 10th in 1922, 19th in 1924, and 12th in 1925. Blue was among the league leaders in bases on balls ten times in his career (1921–1923, 1925–1931). With his ability to get on base, Blue was also a top run scorer, with 1151 runs scored in his career, including six seasons with 100 or more runs. Blue was also one of the best fielding first basemen of his era. In 1571 games at first base, Blue had 15,644 putouts and a career range factor of 10.60 – almost 3.00 full points above the league average of 7.64 for first basemen in his era.

Second baseman Ralph Young played for the Tigers from 1915 to 1921. At 5'5", Young was one of the shortest players ever to wear the Tigers' uniform. His small stature, and correspondingly small strike zone, assisted him in both collecting walks and avoiding strikeouts. In nine seasons, Young collected 495 bases on balls and struck out only 254 times (in 3,643 at bats). In 1921, he hit .299 and was the only Detroit position player at the end of the season who fell short of the .300 mark.

Shortstop Donie Bush was Detroit's starting shortstop for thirteen seasons from 1909 to 1921. In 1914, Bush had 425 putouts (still the major league record for shortstops) and 969 chances (still the American League record). During the decade from 1910 to 1919, no one had more bases on balls than Bush. Bush also ranked among the league leaders in stolen bases nine times. With his ability to get on base, Bush was also among the league leaders in runs scored ten times. Bush was released by the Tigers in late August 1921 and signed by the Washington Senators.

After Bush was released, Ira Flagstead and Herm Merritt played shortstop for Detroit during the balance of the 1921 season. Despite batting .370 in his rookie season, Merritt did not make the team in 1922 and never played another major league game. Merritt died in 1927 at age 26.

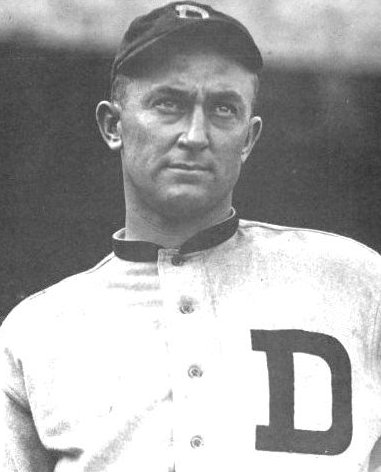
Ty Cobb, 1914

=== Outfield: Veach, Cobb, Heilmann and Shorten ===
Left fielder Harry Heilmann won the first of his four American League batting crowns in 1921, hitting .394. On July 8, 1921, Heilmann hit a home run in Detroit that the New York Tribune reported measured 610 feet – one of the longest home runs ever hit by a Tiger. In addition to winning the batting crown, Heilmann also led the league with 237 hits and was among the league leaders with a .444 on-base percentage (3rd best), .606 slugging percentage (2nd best), 365 total bases (2nd best), 43 doubles (3rd best), 139 RBIs (2nd best), and 76 extra base hits (3rd best). Heilmann also won batting crowns in 1923, 1925, and 1927. Heilmann and Ted Williams are the last two American League players to hit .400, Heilmann having accomplished the feat in 1923 with a batting average of .403. As of the end of the 2009 season, Heilmann's career batting average of .342 is the 12th highest in major league history.

In 1921, the Tigers' owner, Frank Navin, signed center fielder Ty Cobb to take over for Hughie Jennings as the team's manager. The signing caught the baseball world off-guard. Universally disliked (even by the members of his own team) but a legendary player, Cobb's management style left a lot to be desired. He expected as much from his players as he gave, and most of the men did not meet his standard. As a player, Cobb continued to excel, finishing second in the AL batting race to Heilmann with a .389 batting average, with a .596 slugging percentage (3rd in the AL), 124 runs (5th in the AL), 22 stolen bases (4th in the AL), 197 hits (8th in the AL), 65 extra base hits (7th in the AL), and 101 RBIs (9th in the AL).

Bobby Veach was Detroit's starting left fielder for eleven years from 1913 to 1923. Despite being one of the most productive hitters in baseball during his years in Detroit, Veach played in the shadows of three Detroit outfielders who won 16 batting titles and were inducted into the Baseball Hall of Fame: Ty Cobb, Sam Crawford, and Harry Heilmann. Veach had 128 RBIs (4th in the AL) and hit .338 (9th in the AL) in 1921. He led the league in RBIs three times (1915, 1917, and 1918) and was among the league leaders 10 times. Nobody in baseball hit as many RBIs or extra base hits as Veach did during his prime from 1915 to 1922. Veach also ranked among the league leaders in batting average six times and had a career batting average of .311. Veach was also a superior left fielder. His 384 putouts in 1921 and 26 assists in 1920 are among the highest ever by a left fielder.

In 1921, Veach was the subject of an unusual motivational tactic by new player-manager Ty Cobb. Cobb believed that Veach, who came to bat with a smile and engaged in friendly conversation with umpires and opposing pitchers, was too easygoing. Detroit Tigers historian, Fred Lieb, described Veach as a "happy-go-lucky guy, not too brilliant above the ears", who "was as friendly as a Newfoundland pup with opponents as well as teammates." Hoping to light a fire in Veach, Cobb persuaded Harry Heilmann, who followed Veach in the batting order, to taunt Veach from the on-deck circle. "I want you to make him mad. Real mad. . . . [W]hile you're waiting, call him a yellow belly, a quitter and a dog. ... Take that smile off his face." The tactic may have worked, as Veach had career-highs in RBIs (126) and home runs (16), and his batting average jumped from .308 to .338. Cobb had promised to tell Veach about the scheme when the season was over, but he never did. When Heilmann tried to explain, Veach reportedly snarled, "Don't come sucking around me with that phony line." Veach never forgave Heilmann.

=== Pitching: Leonard, Dauss, Ehmke, Oldham and Sutherland ===
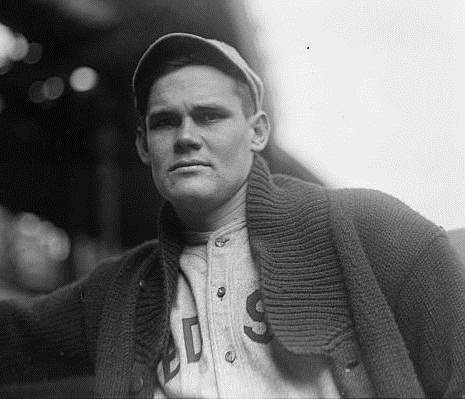
Dutch Leonard

Dutch Leonard was the "ace" of the Tigers' pitching staff in 1921 with a 3.75 ERA—the only pitcher with an ERA below 4.00. In 1914, Leonard set the major league record for the lowest single-season ERA of all time–0.96.

Through his years in Detroit, Leonard fought with manager Ty Cobb. Even before their player-manager feud, Leonard and Cobb had a history. In 1914, Leonard hit Cobb in the ribs with a fastball. In the next at bat, Cobb dragged a bunt down the first base line and ran directly at Leonard who was covering the bag. Cobb later called Leonard a "damned coward" for running toward the dugout to avoid being cut by Cobb's spikes. During a 1922 argument, Leonard cursed Cobb to his face and ended up quitting the team, calling Cobb a "horse's ass." When Leonard returned to the Tigers in 1924, the feud resumed. In 1925, Leonard had an 11–3 record, but Cobb called him shirker. Leonard accused Cobb of over-working him, and Cobb responded in July 1925 by leaving Leonard on the mound for an entire game despite Leonard's giving up 20 hits and taking a 12–4 beating. After that, Leonard refused to pitch for Cobb, and the Tigers put Leonard on waivers, ending Leonard's career.

In 1926, Leonard sought his revenge, accusing Cobb of being involved in fixing games with Tris Speaker. To corroborate his story, Leonard produced letters (including one written by Cobb) that obliquely referred to gambling or game fixing. When Judge Landis made Leonard's letters public, it touched off a scandal. However, Leonard declined to appear and testify at a hearing called by Judge Landis, saying he feared a physical attack from "that wild man". In the absence of Leonard's testimony, Landis found Cobb and Speaker not guilty.

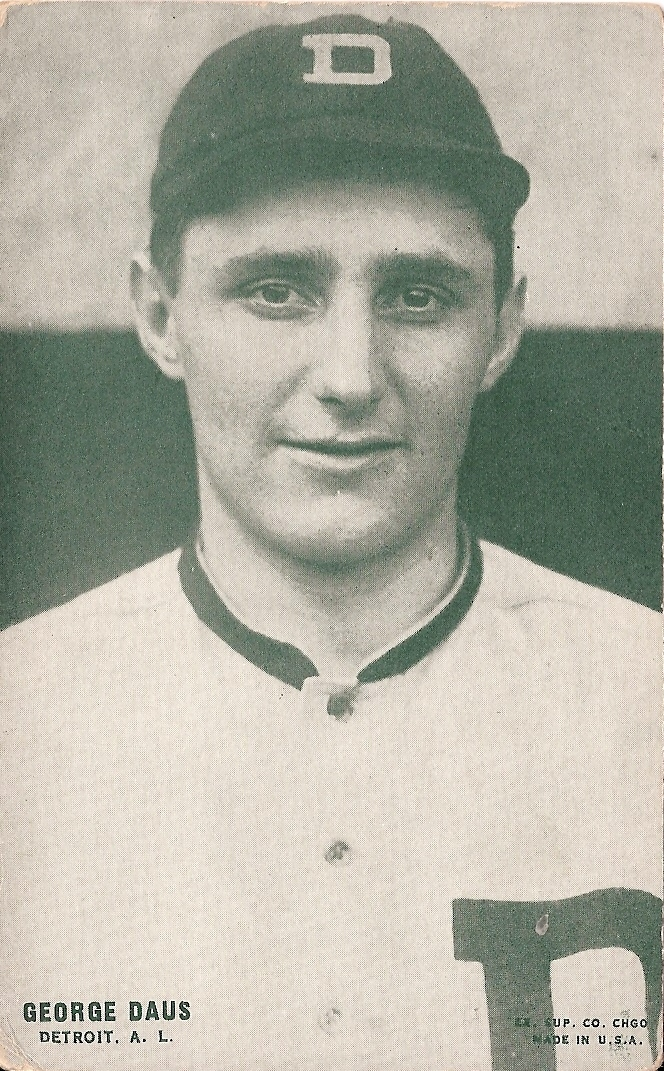
Hooks Dauss

Hooks Dauss played his entire fifteen-year career with the Tigers and is the team's all time wins leader. Though he was among top five in wins five times, Dauss had a 10–15 record in 1921 with a 4.33 ERA. Dauss was an excellent fielding pitcher. His career range factor of 2.28 is 0.65 points higher than the average pitcher of his era. He had 1128 assists in his career, and is career fielding percentage of .968 was also 20 points higher than the average pitcher of his era. Dauss committed only one error in the combined 1923 and 1924 seasons in nearly 100 games pitched.

Howard Ehmke led the 1921 team with 13 wins but had an overall record of 13–14 with a 4.54 ERA. Ehmke ranks No. 16 on the all time major league list for hitting batsmen with a pitch. He hit 137 batters in his career and led the AL in the category in 1921 and six other times, including a career-high 23 in 1922. On August 8, 1920, Ehmke shut out the Yankees 1–0 in one of the shortest games in AL history, lasting only 1 hour‚ 13 minutes. In 1923, he was traded to the Boston Red Sox, where he won 20 games and set the AL record (still standing) for allowing the fewest hits (one) in two consecutive starts.

The team's fourth starter, Red Oldham, had an 11–14 record. As an indicator of how bad the team's pitching was in 1921, Oldham's 4.27 ERA was the second lowest on the team. Shortly after an interview in which new manager Ty Cobb told a reporter that "his aim was to use tact and diplomacy" in dealing with players, Cobb publicly embarrassed Oldham, as he called time-out from his position in center field, "ran in, wrested the ball from Oldham's hand, and gave him a dressing-down before calling in a reliever." Oldham appeared in the final inning of the 1925 World Series for the Pittsburgh Pirates pitching a masterful 1–2–3 inning against three future Hall of Famers: Sam Rice (strikeout), Bucky Harris, and Goose Goslin (strikeout). The Pirates won the game and the World Series with Oldham on the mound.

Suds Sutherland was one of the most interesting stories of the Tigers' 1921 season. Sutherland had pitched a no-hitter in the Pacific Coast League and made the Tigers' team in 1921. One month into the season, he had a record of 5–0. He was 6–2 in his first eight starts. On top of his fine pitching, Sutherland was batting .407 in the first two months of the season. However, Sutherland's career came to an abrupt end in June 1921, as Sutherland found himself in the middle of the Babe Ruth–Ty Cobb feud. In a game against the Yankees, Babe Ruth reportedly hit a 3–0 pitch off Sutherland into the upper deck. Cobb ran in from center field and took out his anger on the rookie pitcher. Though he had the best record on the pitching staff, Cobb never forgave Sutherland for giving up a mammoth blast to the Babe. As a result, Sutherland did not pitch for the Tigers (or for any major league team) after June 1921.

== Regular season ==
=== Season standings ===
American League
Team	W	L	Pct.	GB	Home	Road
New York Yankees	98	55	.641	—	53‍–‍25	45‍–‍30
Cleveland Indians	94	60	.610	4½	51‍–‍26	43‍–‍34
St. Louis Browns	81	73	.526	17½	43‍–‍34	38‍–‍39
Washington Senators	80	73	.523	18	46‍–‍30	34‍–‍43
Boston Red Sox	75	79	.487	23½	41‍–‍36	34‍–‍43
Detroit Tigers	71	82	.464	27	37‍–‍40	34‍–‍42
Chicago White Sox	62	92	.403	36½	37‍–‍40	25‍–‍52
Philadelphia Athletics	53	100	.346	45	28‍–‍47	25‍–‍53

=== Record vs. opponents ===
1921 American League record Sources:
Team	BOS	CWS	CLE	DET	NYY	PHA	SLB	WSH
Boston	—	15–7	8–14	15–7	7–15	12–10	9–13	9–13
Chicago	7–15	—	7–15	8–14	13–9	14–8	7–15	6–16
Cleveland	14–8	15–7	—	13–9	8–14	15–7	17–5	12–10
Detroit	7–15	14–8	9–13	—	5–17	14–7–1	12–10	10–12
New York	15–7	9–13	14–8	17–5	—	17–5	13–9	13–8
Philadelphia	10–12	8–14	7–15	7–14–1	5–17	—	5–17	11–11–1
St. Louis	13–9	15–7	5–17	10–12	9–13	17–5	—	12–10
Washington	13–9	16–6	10–12	12–10	8–13	11–11–1	10–12	—

=== Roster ===
1921 Detroit Tigers
Roster
Pitchers: Doc Ayers; Dan Boone; Bert Cole; Hooks Dauss; Howard Ehmke; Carl Holling; Dutch Leonard; Jim Middleton; Red Oldham; Slicker Parks; Pol Perritt; Lefty Stewart; Suds Sutherland; Jim Walsh	Catchers: Eddie Ainsmith; Johnny Bassler; Clyde Manion; Larry Woodall; Infielders: Sam Barnes; Lu Blue; Donie Bush; Ira Flagstead; Clarence Huber; Bob Jones; Herm Merritt; Joe Sargent; Jackie Tavener; Ralph Young	Outfielders: Ty Cobb; George Cunningham; Harry Heilmann; Chick Shorten; Bobby Veach; Other batters: Sammy Hale	Manager: Ty Cobb; Coaches: Dan Howley

=== Season summary ===
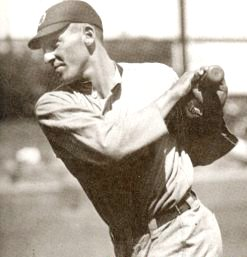
Ira Flagstead

The 1921 Tigers were one of the best hitting teams in baseball history. Their team batting average of .316 is the highest in American League history and the second highest in modern major league history, trailing only the 1930 New York Giants, who had a team batting average of .319. (The American League batting average in 1921 was .302, and the National League batting average in 1930 was .309. So measured against the league batting average for their respective seasons, the 1921 Tigers were 14 points above average, and the 1930 Giants were ten points above league average.)

The Tigers also amassed 1724 hits in 1921—the highest single season total by any team in American League history. Only one other American League team and four National League teams (all during an aberrant 1930 season when the National League batting average was .309) have had 1700 hits in a single season. They are:

- 1930 Philadelphia Phillies – 1783 hits (.315 batting average)
- 1930 New York Giants – 1769 hits (.319 batting average)
- 1930 St. Louis Cardinals – 1732 hits (.314 batting average)
- 1921 Detroit Tigers – 1724 hits (.316 batting average)
- 1930 Chicago Cubs – 1722 hits (.309 batting average)
- 1936 Cleveland Indians – 1715 hits (.305 batting average)

The 1921 Tigers had six starters with batting averages of .300 or higher:

- Right fielder Harry Heilmann led the American League with a .394 average.
- Center fielder Ty Cobb was second in the American League with a .389 average.
- Right fielder Bobby Veach was ninth in the American League with a .338 average.
- First baseman Lu Blue hit .308 in his rookie season with a .416 on-base percentage.
- Catcher Johnny Bassler hit .307 with a .401 on-base percentage.
- Third baseman Bob Jones hit .303.

All three Tigers outfielders were among the league leaders in RBIs in 1921.

- Right fielder Harry Heilmann was second in the league behind Babe Ruth with 139 RBIs.
- Left fielder Bobby Veach was fourth in the league with 128 RBIs.
- Center fielder Ty Cobb was ninth in the league with 101 RBIs.

Despite having one of the best batting lineups in baseball history, the 1921 Tigers finished in sixth place with a losing record. As early proof of the baseball adage that "Good Pitching Beats Good Hitting", the downfall of the 1921 Tigers was the absence of good pitching. The team ERA was 4.40, no Detroit pitcher won more than 13 games, and only one pitcher (Dutch Leonard) had an ERA below 4.24.

=== Season chronology ===
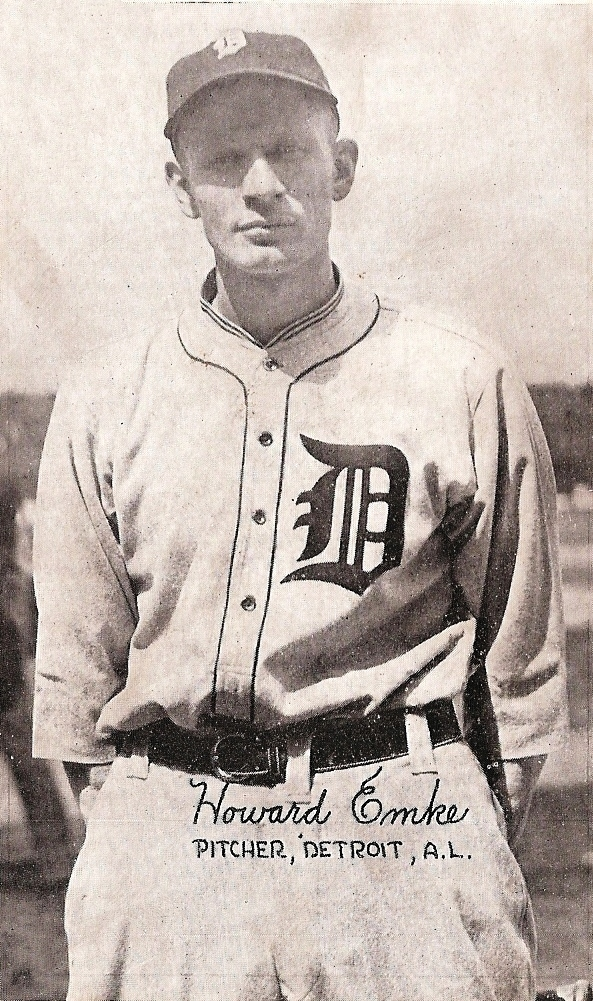
Howard Ehmke

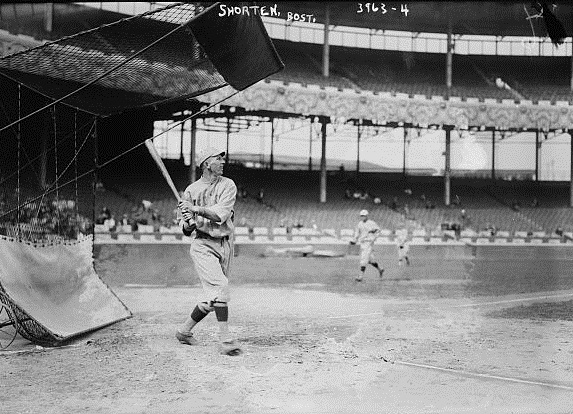
Chick Shorten

- April 14: First baseman Lu Blue made his major league debut for the Tigers, as they beat the White Sox, 6–5, on Opening Day at Navin Field. Dutch Leonard started the game, and relief pitcher Suds Sutherland got the win.
- May 11: Detroit pitcher Suds Sutherland got off to a hot start, winning his fifth game in the first month of the season, a 2–1 victory over Waite Hoyt and the New York Yankees.
- May 20: The Tigers beat the Red Sox, 12–2. At that point, the Tigers were 2½ games out of first place.
- June 11–14: Babe Ruth hit six home runs off Detroit pitching during a four-game series in Detroit. Even though the Tigers scored 28 runs and picked up 47 hits in the four-game series, the Yankees scores 41 runs, picked up 57 hits, and swept the series. Howard Ehmke and Hooks Dauss each gave up two home runs to Ruth, but rookie Suds Sutherland (who gave up a long home run to Ruth) took the brunt of manager Ty Cobb's anger. Sutherland had the team's best win–loss record at 6–2, but Cobb never forgave Sutherland for giving up a mammoth blast to the Babe. As a result, Sutherland did not pitch for the Tigers after June 21, 1921.
- June 18: The Tigers lost 11–7 to the Red Sox. AFter being swept by the Yankees, the Tigers were swept by the Bosox in a four-game series. The team's nine-game skid in mid-June marked the turning point for the team. The team trailed by four-and-a-half games on June 10; by June 19 they were 10 games out of first.
- June 24: The Tigers won, 12–0, as Dutch Leonard shut out the Browns. The Tigers' pitching staff had only four shutouts in the 1921 season, a 9–0 win by Red Oldham on May 5, Leonard's win on June 24, a 10–0 win by Bert Cole on August 19, and a 5–0 win by Howard Ehmke on August 21.
- July 19: The Tigers lost to Waite Hoyt and the Yankees, 6–5. At that point, the Tigers had lost six straight games to dropped 15 games out of first place.
- July 29: The Tigers scored a season-high 18 runs in an 18–6 win over the Senators. Howard Ehmke got the win for the Tigers, who scored 10 or more runs 24 times during the 1921 season.
- August 20: After the Tigers released shortstop Donie Bush, he was selected off waivers by the Washington Senators. Before his release, Bush had been the Tigers starting shortstop for thirteen years—since the close of the 1908 season.
- August 24: After beating the Senators, 12–3, the previous day, the Tigers beat the Senators again, this time by a score of 15–1, with Bert Cole getting the win. The win marked the team's sixth straight win—their longest win streak of the 1921 season.
- September 9: The Tigers lost a slugfest to the White Sox, 20–15, as the two teams combined for 42 hits and 35 runs. The team dropped to 21½ games out of first place.
- September 24: Tigers' shortstop Jackie Tavener made his major league debut. The Tigers lost, 5–1, to Walter Johnson and the Washington Senators. At that point, they were 23 games out of first place.
- October 2: The Tigers closed the 1921 season on a seven-game losing streak. They lost the final two games to the St. Louis Browns, by scores of 11–6 and 12–3. Detroit pitching gave up nine or more runs in 28 games during the 1921 season. They held opponents to less than two runs in only 18 games.

== Player stats ==
= Indicates team leader

= Indicates league leader

=== Batting ===
==== Starters by position ====
Note: Pos = Position; G = Games played; AB = At bats; H = Hits; Avg. = Batting average; HR = Home runs; RBI = Runs batted in

Pos	Player	G	AB	H	Avg.	HR	RBI
C	Johnny Bassler	119	388	119	.307	0	56
1B	Lu Blue	153	585	180	.308	5	75
2B	Ralph Young	107	401	120	.299	0	29
3B	Bob Jones	141	554	168	.303	1	72
SS	Donie Bush	104	402	113	.281	0	27
OF	Bobby Veach	150	612	207	.338	16	128
OF	Ty Cobb	128	507	197	.389	12	101
OF	Harry Heilmann	149	602	237	.394	19	139

==== Other batters ====
Note: G = Games played; AB = At bats; H = Hits; Avg. = Batting average; HR = Home runs; RBI = Runs batted in

Player	G	AB	H	Avg.	HR	RBI
Ira Flagstead	85	259	79	.305	0	31
Chick Shorten	92	217	59	.272	0	23
Joe Sargent	66	178	45	.253	2	22
Eddie Ainsmith	35	98	27	.276	0	12
Larry Woodall	46	80	29	.363	0	14
Herm Merritt	20	46	17	.370	0	6
Sam Barnes	7	11	2	.182	0	0
Clyde Manion	12	10	2	.200	0	2
Jackie Tavener	2	4	0	.000	0	0
Sammy Hale	9	2	0	.000	0	0
Clarence Huber	1	0	0	----	0	0
George Cunningham	1	0	0	----	0	0

Note: pitchers' batting statistics not included.

=== Pitching ===
==== Starting pitchers ====
Note: G = Games pitched; IP = Innings pitched; W = Wins; L = Losses; ERA = Earned run average; SO = Strikeouts

Player	G	IP	W	L	ERA	SO
Dutch Leonard	36	245.0	11	13	3.75	120
Hooks Dauss	32	233.0	10	15	4.33	68
Red Oldham	40	229.1	11	14	4.24	67
Howard Ehmke	30	196.1	13	14	4.54	68

==== Other pitchers ====
Note: G = Games pitched; IP = Innings pitched; W = Wins; L = Losses; ERA = Earned run average; SO = Strikeouts

Player	G	IP	W	L	ERA	SO
Carl Holling	35	136.0	3	7	4.30	38
Jim Middleton	38	121.2	6	11	5.03	31
Bert Cole	20	109.2	7	4	4.27	22
Suds Sutherland	13	58.0	6	2	4.97	18
Pol Perritt	4	13.0	1	0	4.85	3
Doc Ayers	2	4.0	0	0	9.00	0

==== Relief pitchers ====
Note: G = Games pitched; W = Wins; L = Losses; SV = Saves; ERA = Earned run average; SO = Strikeouts

Player	G	W	L	SV	ERA	SO
Slicker Parks	10	3	2	0	5.68	10
Lefty Stewart	5	0	0	1	12.00	4
Jim Walsh	3	0	0	0	2.25	3
Dan Boone	1	0	0	0	0.00	0

== Awards and honors ==
=== League leaders ===
- Hooks Dauss: American League leader in hit batsmen (13) (tied with Ehmke)
- Howard Ehmke: American League leader in hit batsmen (13) (tied with Dauss)
- Harry Heilmann: American League batting champion (.394)
- Harry Heilmann: Major League Baseball hits leader (237)
- Bob Jones: American League leader in errors by a third baseman (27)
- Dutch Leonard: American League leader in strikeout to walk ratio (1.90)
- Bobby Veach: American League leader in putouts by an outfielder (384)

=== Players ranking among top 100 of all time at position ===
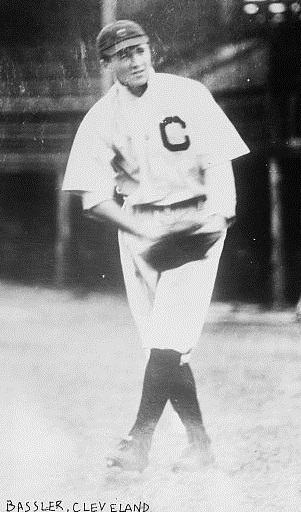
Catcher Johnny Bassler

The following members of the 1921 Detroit Tigers are among the Top 100 players of all time at their position, as ranked in The New Bill James Historical Baseball Abstract in 2001:

- Johnny Bassler: 47th best catcher of all time
- Lu Blue: 77th best first baseman of all time
- Donie Bush: 51st best shortstop of all time
- Bobby Veach: 33rd best left fielder of all time
- Ty Cobb: 2nd best center fielder of all time
- Harry Heilmann: 16th best right fielder of all time

== Farm system ==
Level	Team	League	Manager
AA	Rochester Colts	International League	George Stallings
A	Fort Worth Panthers	Texas League	Jake Atz

LEAGUE CHAMPIONS: Fort Worth
