= 1921 New York Yankees season =

Season for the Major League Baseball team the New York Yankees

1921 New York Yankees
- American League Champion
- League: American League
- Ballpark: Polo Grounds
- City: New York City, New York
- Record: 98–55 (.641)
- League place: 1st
- Owners: Jacob Ruppert and Tillinghast L'Hommedieu Huston
- General managers: Ed Barrow
- Managers: Miller Huggins

The 1921 New York Yankees season was the 19th season for the Yankees. The team finished with a record of 98–55, winning their first pennant in franchise history, winning the American League by 4 1/2 games over the previous year's champion, the Cleveland Indians. New York was managed by Miller Huggins. Their home games were played at the Polo Grounds.

== Regular season ==
With star slugger Babe Ruth hitting 59 home runs, setting a new major league home run record for the third consecutive year, while also having his greatest overall season statistically, the Yankees appeared to be the team to beat in the World Series. Their landlords, the New York Giants, had rebuilt after slipping a bit in the late 1910s, and had won the National League pennant. For the first time, all the games of a World Series would be held in the same ballpark, the Polo Grounds. The best-5-of-9 Series (its last before returning to the best-4-of-7 format) saw the Yankees take a 2 games to 0 lead and later a 3–2 series lead, but Ruth suffered a serious injury in game 3 that limited his appearances in the remaining games, save for one pinch-hit appearance, and the Giants rallied to win the Series 5 games to 3.

=== Season standings ===
American League
Team	W	L	Pct.	GB	Home	Road
New York Yankees	98	55	.641	—	53‍–‍25	45‍–‍30
Cleveland Indians	94	60	.610	4½	51‍–‍26	43‍–‍34
St. Louis Browns	81	73	.526	17½	43‍–‍34	38‍–‍39
Washington Senators	80	73	.523	18	46‍–‍30	34‍–‍43
Boston Red Sox	75	79	.487	23½	41‍–‍36	34‍–‍43
Detroit Tigers	71	82	.464	27	37‍–‍40	34‍–‍42
Chicago White Sox	62	92	.403	36½	37‍–‍40	25‍–‍52
Philadelphia Athletics	53	100	.346	45	28‍–‍47	25‍–‍53

=== Record vs. opponents ===
1921 American League record Sources:
Team	BOS	CWS	CLE	DET	NYY	PHA	SLB	WSH
Boston	—	15–7	8–14	15–7	7–15	12–10	9–13	9–13
Chicago	7–15	—	7–15	8–14	13–9	14–8	7–15	6–16
Cleveland	14–8	15–7	—	13–9	8–14	15–7	17–5	12–10
Detroit	7–15	14–8	9–13	—	5–17	14–7–1	12–10	10–12
New York	15–7	9–13	14–8	17–5	—	17–5	13–9	13–8
Philadelphia	10–12	8–14	7–15	7–14–1	5–17	—	5–17	11–11–1
St. Louis	13–9	15–7	5–17	10–12	9–13	17–5	—	12–10
Washington	13–9	16–6	10–12	12–10	8–13	11–11–1	10–12	—

=== Roster ===
1921 New York Yankees
Roster
Pitchers: Rip Collins; Alex Ferguson; Harry Harper; Waite Hoyt; Carl Mays; Bill Piercy; Jack Quinn; Tom Rogers; Bob Shawkey; Tom Sheehan	Catchers: Al DeVormer; Fred Hofmann; Wally Schang; Infielders: Frank Baker; Mike McNally; Johnny Mitchell; Roger Peckinpaugh; Wally Pipp; Aaron Ward	Outfielders: Ping Bodie; Tom Connelly; Chick Fewster; Chicken Hawks; Bob Meusel; Elmer Miller; Braggo Roth; Babe Ruth	Manager: Miller Huggins; Coaches: Charley O'Leary; Frank Roth

== Player stats ==
= Indicates team leader

= Indicates league leader

=== Batting ===
==== Starters by position ====
Note: Pos = Position; G = Games played; AB = At bats; H = Hits; Avg. = Batting average; HR = Home runs; RBI = Runs batted in

Pos	Player	G	AB	H	Avg.	HR	RBI
C	Wally Schang	134	424	134	.316	6	55
1B	Wally Pipp	153	588	174	.296	8	98
2B	Aaron Ward	153	556	170	.306	5	75
3B	Frank Baker	94	330	97	.294	9	71
SS	Roger Peckinpaugh	149	577	166	.288	8	71
OF	Babe Ruth	152	540	204	.378	59	168
OF	Bob Meusel	149	598	190	.318	24	138
OF	Elmer Miller	56	242	72	.298	4	36

==== Other batters ====
Note: G = Games played; AB = At bats; H = Hits; Avg. = Batting average; HR = Home runs; RBI = Runs batted in

Player	G	AB	H	Avg.	HR	RBI
Mike McNally	71	215	56	.260	1	24
Chick Fewster	66	207	58	.280	1	19
Braggo Roth	43	152	43	.283	2	10
Ping Bodie	31	87	15	.172	0	12
Chicken Hawks	41	73	21	.280	2	15
Fred Hofmann	23	62	11	.177	1	5
Al DeVormer	22	49	17	.347	0	7
Johnny Mitchell	13	42	11	.262	0	2
Tom Connelly	4	5	1	.200	0	0

=== Pitching ===
==== Starting pitchers ====
Note: G = Games pitched; IP = Innings pitched; W = Wins; L = Losses; ERA = Earned run average; SO = Strikeouts

Player	G	IP	W	L	ERA	SO
Carl Mays	49	336.2	27*	9	3.05	70
Waite Hoyt	43	282.1	19	13	3.09	102
Bob Shawkey	38	245.0	18	12	4.08	35
Bill Piercy	14	81.2	5	4	2.98	35
Harry Harper	8	52.2	4	3	3.76	22

Note: Carl Mays was team leader in saves with 7.

- Tied with Urban Shocker (St Louis Browns)

==== Other pitchers ====
Note: G = Games pitched; IP = Innings pitched; W = Wins; L = Losses; ERA = Earned run average; SO = Strikeouts

Player	G	IP	W	L	ERA	SO
Rip Collins	28	137.1	11	5	5.44	64
Jack Quinn	33	119.0	8	7	3.78	44
Alex Ferguson	17	56.1	3	1	5.91	9
Babe Ruth	2	9.0	2	0	9.00	2

==== Relief pitchers ====
Note: G = Games pitched; W = Wins; L = Losses; SV = Saves; ERA = Earned run average; SO = Strikeouts

Player	G	W	L	SV	ERA	SO
Tom Sheehan	12	1	0	1	5.45	7
Tom Rogers	5	0	1	1	7.36	0

== World Series ==
Game	Date	Visitor	Score	Home	Score	Record (NYG-NYY)	Attendance
1	October 5	New York Yankees	3	New York Giants	0	0–1	30,202
2	October 6	New York Giants	0	New York Yankees	3	0–2	34,939
3	October 7	New York Yankees	5	New York Giants	13	1–2	36,509
4	October 9 ‡	New York Giants	4	New York Yankees	2	2–2	36,372
5	October 10 ‡	New York Yankees	3	New York Giants	1	2–3	35,758
6	October 11 ‡	New York Giants	8	New York Yankees	5	3–3	34,238
7	October 12 ‡	New York Yankees	1	New York Giants	2	4–3	36,503
8	October 13 ‡	New York Giants	1	New York Yankees	0	5–3	25,410
New York Giants win 5–3

== Awards and honors ==
=== Major league records ===
- Babe Ruth, major league record, Most total bases in one season (457)

=== Franchise records ===
- Babe Ruth, Yankees single season record, runs scored in a season (177)
