= 1921 Cleveland Indians season =

1921 Cleveland Indians
- League: American League
- Ballpark: Dunn Field
- City: Cleveland, Ohio
- Owners: Jim Dunn
- Managers: Tris Speaker

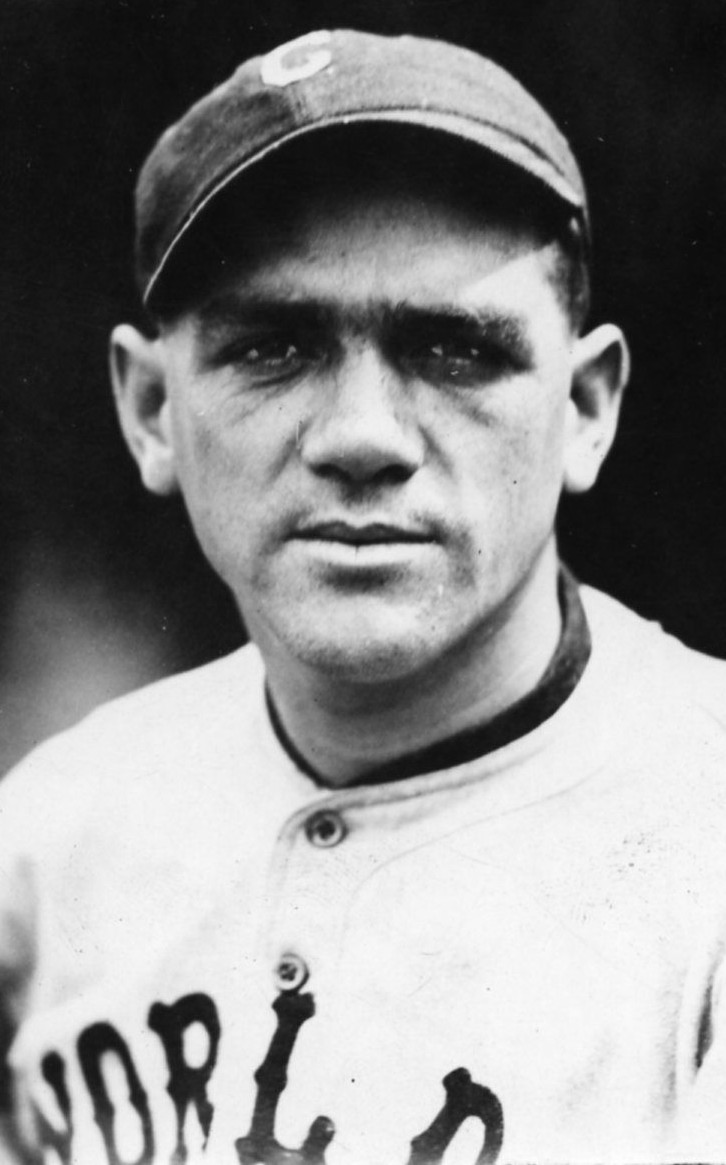
Steve O'Neill of the Cleveland Naps, 1921

The 1921 Cleveland Indians season was a season in American baseball. A year after winning their first World Series championship, the team finished second in the American League with a record of 94–60, 4.5 games behind the New York Yankees.

== Regular season ==
=== Season standings ===
American League
Team	W	L	Pct.	GB	Home	Road
New York Yankees	98	55	.641	—	53‍–‍25	45‍–‍30
Cleveland Indians	94	60	.610	4½	51‍–‍26	43‍–‍34
St. Louis Browns	81	73	.526	17½	43‍–‍34	38‍–‍39
Washington Senators	80	73	.523	18	46‍–‍30	34‍–‍43
Boston Red Sox	75	79	.487	23½	41‍–‍36	34‍–‍43
Detroit Tigers	71	82	.464	27	37‍–‍40	34‍–‍42
Chicago White Sox	62	92	.403	36½	37‍–‍40	25‍–‍52
Philadelphia Athletics	53	100	.346	45	28‍–‍47	25‍–‍53

=== Record vs. opponents ===
1921 American League record Sources:
Team	BOS	CWS	CLE	DET	NYY	PHA	SLB	WSH
Boston	—	15–7	8–14	15–7	7–15	12–10	9–13	9–13
Chicago	7–15	—	7–15	8–14	13–9	14–8	7–15	6–16
Cleveland	14–8	15–7	—	13–9	8–14	15–7	17–5	12–10
Detroit	7–15	14–8	9–13	—	5–17	14–7–1	12–10	10–12
New York	15–7	9–13	14–8	17–5	—	17–5	13–9	13–8
Philadelphia	10–12	8–14	7–15	7–14–1	5–17	—	5–17	11–11–1
St. Louis	13–9	15–7	5–17	10–12	9–13	17–5	—	12–10
Washington	13–9	16–6	10–12	12–10	8–13	11–11–1	10–12	—

=== Roster ===
1921 Cleveland Indians
Roster
Pitchers: Jim Bagby; Ray Caldwell; Bob Clark; Stan Coveleski; Bernie Henderson; Duster Mails; Guy Morton; Ted Odenwald; Jesse Petty; Allen Sothoron; George Uhle	Catchers: Les Nunamaker; Steve O'Neill; Luke Sewell; Ginger Shinault; Pinch Thomas; Art Wilson; Infielders: George Burns; Larry Gardner; Lou Guisto; Doc Johnston; Joe Sewell; Riggs Stephenson; Bill Wambsganss	Outfielders: Joe Evans; Jack Graney; Charlie Jamieson; Tex Jeanes; Elmer Smith; Tris Speaker; Joe Wood	Manager: Tris Speaker; Coaches: Jack McCallister

== Player stats ==
=== Batting ===
==== Starters by position ====
Note: Pos = Position; G = Games played; AB = At bats; H = Hits; Avg. = Batting average; HR = Home runs; RBI = Runs batted in

Pos	Player	G	AB	H	Avg.	HR	RBI
C	Steve O'Neill	106	335	108	.322	1	50
1B	Doc Johnston	118	384	114	.297	2	46
2B	Bill Wambsganss	107	410	117	.285	2	47
SS	Joe Sewell	154	572	182	.318	4	93
3B	Larry Gardner	153	586	187	.319	3	120
OF	Charlie Jamieson	140	536	166	.310	1	46
OF	Elmer Smith	129	431	125	.290	16	85
OF	Tris Speaker	132	506	183	.362	3	75

==== Other batters ====
Note: G = Games played; AB = At bats; H = Hits; Avg. = Batting average; HR = Home runs; RBI = Runs batted in

Player	G	AB	H	Avg.	HR	RBI
George Burns	84	244	88	.361	0	49
Riggs Stephenson	65	206	68	.330	2	34
Smoky Joe Wood	66	194	71	.366	4	60
Joe Evans	57	153	51	.333	0	21
Les Nunamaker	46	131	47	.359	0	25
Jack Graney	68	107	32	.299	2	18
Pinch Thomas	21	35	9	.257	0	4
Ginger Shinault	22	29	11	.379	0	4
Luke Sewell	3	6	0	.000	0	1
Tex Jeanes	5	3	2	.667	0	4
Lou Guisto	2	2	1	.500	0	1
Art Wilson	2	1	0	.000	0	0

=== Pitching ===
==== Starting pitchers ====
Note: G = Games pitched; IP = Innings pitched; W = Wins; L = Losses; ERA = Earned run average; SO = Strikeouts

Player	G	IP	W	L	ERA	SO
Stan Coveleski	43	315.0	23	13	3.37	99
George Uhle	41	238.0	16	13	4.01	63
Duster Mails	34	194.1	14	8	3.94	87

==== Other pitchers ====
Note: G = Games pitched; IP = Innings pitched; W = Wins; L = Losses; ERA = Earned run average; SO = Strikeouts

Player	G	IP	W	L	ERA	SO
Jim Bagby	40	191.2	14	12	4.70	37
Ray Caldwell	37	147.0	6	6	4.90	76
Allan Sothoron	22	144.2	12	4	3.24	61
Guy Morton	30	107.2	8	3	2.76	45
Bernie Henderson	2	3.0	0	1	9.00	1

==== Relief pitchers ====
Note: G = Games pitched; W = Wins; L = Losses; SV = Saves; ERA = Earned run average; SO = Strikeouts

Player	G	W	L	SV	ERA	SO
Ted Odenwald	10	1	0	0	1.56	4
Bob Clark	5	0	0	0	14.46	2
Jesse Petty	4	0	0	0	2.00	0
