= Lu Blue =

American baseball player (1897–1958)

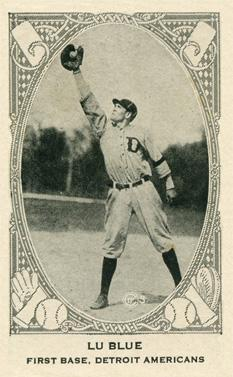
- First baseman
- Born: March 5, 1897; Washington, D.C., U.S.
- Died: July 28, 1958 (aged 61); Alexandria, Virginia, U.S.
- Batted: Switch Threw: Left

MLB debut
- April 14, 1921, for the Detroit Tigers

Last MLB appearance
- April 25, 1933, for the Brooklyn Dodgers

MLB statistics
- Batting average: .287
- Home runs: 44
- Runs batted in: 695
- Stats at Baseball Reference

Teams
- Detroit Tigers (1921–1927); St. Louis Browns (1928–1930); Chicago White Sox (1931–1932); Brooklyn Dodgers (1933)

Luzerne Atwell "Lu" Blue (March 5, 1897 – July 28, 1958) was an American professional baseball first baseman. He played in Major League Baseball (MLB) for the Detroit Tigers, St. Louis Browns, Chicago White Sox, and Brooklyn Dodgers between 1921 and 1933.

A native of Washington, D.C., Blue played professional baseball, principally as a first baseman, for 18 years from 1916 to 1933, including 13 years in Major League Baseball for the Detroit Tigers from 1921 to 1932, the St. Louis Browns from 1928 to 1930, the Chicago White Sox in 1931 and 1932, and the Brooklyn Dodgers for one game in 1933. Blue was a switch-hitter who had a career on-base percentage of .402 and was one of the best fielding first basemen of his era. He interrupted his baseball career for military service in World War I and was later honored with burial at Arlington National Cemetery. In 2001, baseball historian Bill James ranked Blue as the 77th best first baseman of all time.

== Early life ==
Blue was born in Washington, D.C., in 1897. He was one of two sons born to Charles H. Blue, a New Jersey native born in 1852, and Ida Mae (Reamer) Blue, a Pennsylvania native born in 1856. His parents divorced when he was a child.

Blue grew up a fan of the Washington Senators. Despite discouragement from his family, who thought baseball was a waste of time, Blue was determined to play baseball. He attended Briarly Hall Military School in Poolesville, Maryland, where his play for the school's baseball team drew the attention of professional scouts.

== Professional career ==
=== Minor leagues ===
Blue began playing Martinsburg Blue Sox of the Blue Ridge League. He compiled a disappointing .216 batting average in 1916, but his average jumped to .319 with a .517 slugging percentage in 1917. A switch-hitter, Blue reportedly hit grand slams from both sides of the plate in the same game during the 1917 season.

The Detroit Tigers purchased Blue's contract in the fall of 1917. He did not make the team in 1918 and was drafted into the U.S. Army, serving at Camp Lee in Virginia during World War I. After the war, the Tigers assigned Blue to the Portland Beavers in the Pacific Coast League. Blue appeared in 174 games for the Beavers in 1919 and compiled a .281 batting average. The following year, he appeared in 165 games for Portland and compiled a .291 average.

=== Detroit Tigers ===
In 1921, with Ty Cobb as the Tigers' new player-manager, Blue finally made it to the big leagues at age 24. He immediately became the Tigers' regular first baseman, starting 152 games at the position in 1921, and compiling a .308 batting average and a .416 on-base percentage. Blue later gave credit to Cobb for helping him to improve his performance as a hitter.

Blue remained entrenched as the Tigers' starting first baseman for seven seasons, from 1921 to 1927. Blue was a reliable hitter in his years at Detroit, hitting above .300 four times, including a .311 season in 1924. He finished among the leaders in the voting for the American League Most Valuable Player award three times for the Tigers: 10th in 1922, 19th in 1924, and 12th in 1925. In addition to hitting for average, Blue had a keen eye and a talent for drawing walks. He was among the league leaders in bases on balls ten times in his career (1921–1923, 1925–31). He finished his career with 1,092 walks.

Driven largely by his ability to draw walks, Blue was also among the league leaders in on-base percentage four times, including a career-high .430 on-base percentage in 1931 – second best in the American League. Blue's career on-base percentage was .402 – 115 points above his .287 career batting average.

With his ability to get on base, Blue was also a top run scorer, with 1,151 runs scored in his career, including six seasons with 100 or more runs and a career-high 131 runs as the leadoff hitter for the 1921 Detroit Tigers.

Blue was also an excellent fielding first baseman. In 1,571 games at first base, Blue had 15,644 putouts and a career range factor of 10.60 – almost 3.00 full points above the league average of 7.64 for first basemen in his era. In 1922, his range factor was 11.2 – more than 4.20 points higher than the league average of 6.94. He had 1,506 putouts in 1922 and led American League first basemen in putouts in 1929 (1,491) and 1931 (1,452). He also led American League first basemen in assists in 1928 (107) and double plays (121). Often among the league leaders in fielding percentage, Blue would get to balls other first baseman could not touch. On September 8, 1922, Blue had two unassisted double plays in a single game.

On June 19, 1923, Blue was knocked unconscious after being hit in the head by a ball during fielding practice. Blue nevertheless went to bat in the first inning and hit a single to right field. Blue was woozy from the pre-game blow and barely made it to first base. The Yankees agreed to allow a courtesy runner, and Blue later returned to finish the game.

In 1927, Blue clashed with the Tigers' new manager, George Moriarty. Moriarty moved Blue from the leadoff spot to the seventh spot in the batting order. Blue's relationship with Moriarty deteriorated through the season, with Blue announcing at the end of the season that he would never play another game for the Tigers.

=== St. Louis Browns ===
On December 13, 1927, the Tigers traded Blue and Heinie Manush to the St. Louis Browns in exchange for Harry Rice, Elam Vangilder and a player to be named later. Blue and Manush both became stars for the Browns. In 1928, Blue appeared in 154 games, all at first base, and compiled a .281 batting average and 80 RBIs. He ranked among the American League's leaders in 1928 with 105 bases on balls (second), 116 runs scored (fourth), 14 home runs (sixth), 263 times on base (sixth), 57 extra base hits (eighth), a 4.7 wins above replacement rating (eighth among position players), and 250 total bases (tenth). He also led the American League's first basemen with 107 assists and 121 double plays turned. With former Tigers Blue and Manush in the lineup, the Browns compiled an 82-72 record and finished third in the American League.

In 1929, Blue appeared in 151 games for the Browns, all at first base, and compiled a .293 batting average. He led the American League with 296 total times on base and ranked second with 126 bases on balls and sixth with a .422 on-base percentage. He also led the American League's first basemen with 1,491 putouts and ranked fourth with 88 assists.

In 1930, Blue appeared in only 117 games, 111 at first base. He suffered from a sore arm in 1930, and his batting average slipped to .231.

=== Chicago White Sox ===
After a poor performance in 1930, the Browns sent a new contract to Blue reducing his salary of $14,500 to less than half that amount. Blue refused to sign on those terms, and on April 3, 1931, the Browns sold Blue to the Chicago White Sox. Blue returned to the leadoff spot for the White Sox and responded with one of the best seasons of his career. He compiled a .304 batting average and ranked among the American League leaders with 15 triples (second), 127 bases on balls (second), 309 times on base (third), a .430 on-base percentage (fifth), 119 runs scored (sixth) and 13 stolen bases (tenth). He also had an outstanding season defensively, leading the league's first basemen with 1,452 putouts, and ranking among the league leaders with 81 assists (third), 105 double plays turned (fourth), and a 10.14 range factor per nine innings (fourth). His 16 errors also ranked second in the league. He wound up 17th in the voting for the 1931 American League Most Valuable Player award.

In 1932, Blue appeared in 112 games for the White Sox, including 100 as the team's starting first baseman. His batting average dropped to .249–55 points lower than the prior season. However, he ranked among the American League's leaders with 17 stolen bases (fifth) and 88 assists at first base (second), 106 double plays at first base (fourth), and a 10.91 range factor per nine innings at first base (second). He was eventually benched in favor of Billy Sullivan and released on February 2, 1933.

=== Brooklyn and Toronto ===
On April 19, 1933, Blue was signed as a free agent by the Brooklyn Dodgers. He appeared in only one game for the Dodgers on April 25, 1933, failing to hit in a single plate appearance. He was released by the Dodgers on April 29, 1933.

Blue played 13 seasons in the major leagues and compiled a career batting average of .287 and a career on-base percentage of .402. He totaled 2,365 total bases, 1,696 hits, 1,152 runs scored, 1,092 bases on balls, 319 doubles, 109 triples and 151 stolen bases.

On May 8, 1933, Blue signed with the Toronto Maple Leafs of the International League. He appeared in 113 games for Toronto and compiled a .259 batting average.

== Family and later years ==
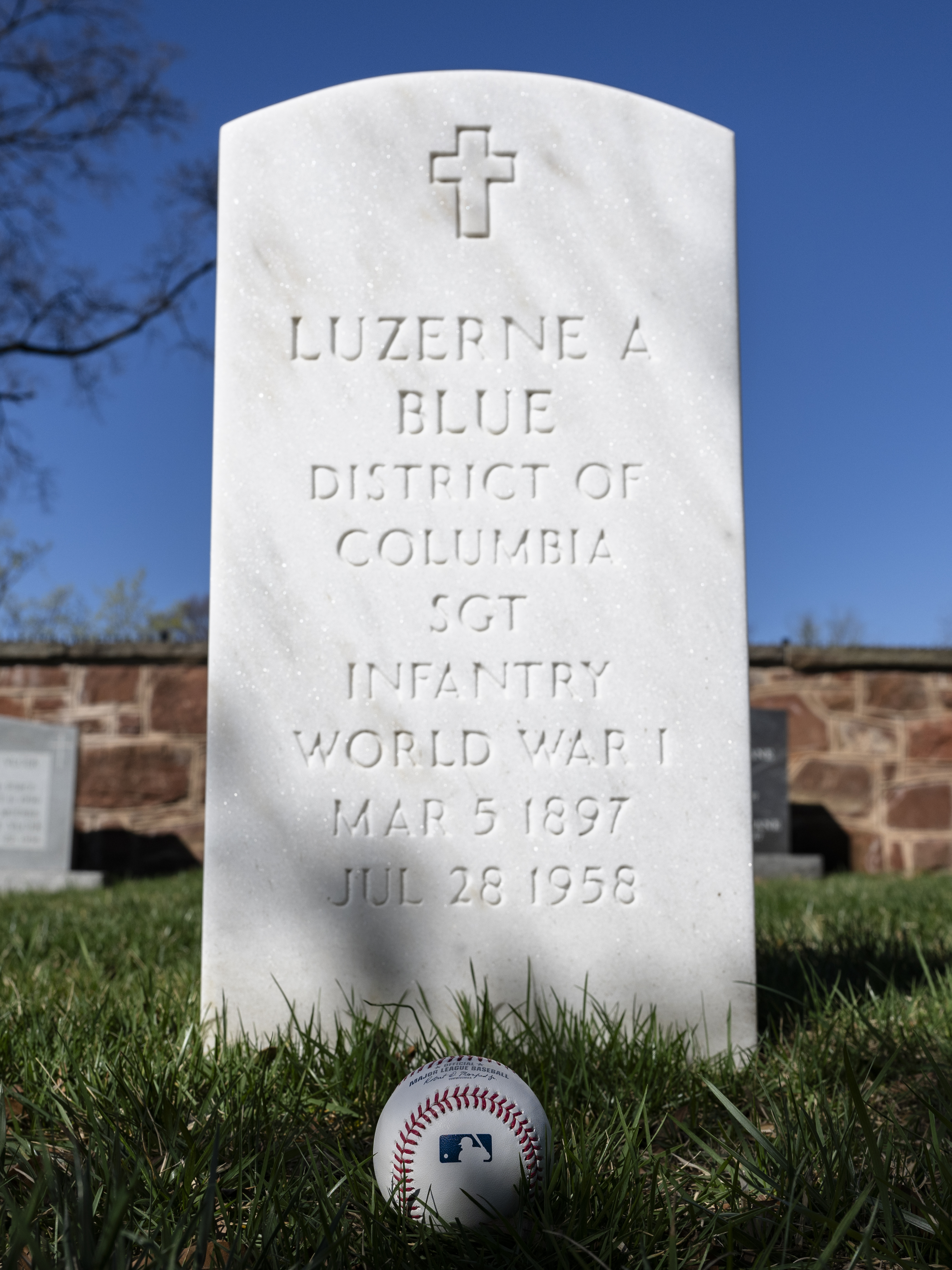
Luzerne "Lu" Blue gravestone in Section 15D of Arlington National Cemetery, Virginia

Blue was married at least twice. On June 9, 1924, he was married in Detroit to Pauline Chambers, a native of Texas. He was later married to Helen Blue.

After retiring from baseball, Blue became a chicken farmer in Colesville, Maryland. He later operated a chinchilla farm. He also operated one of the first "baseball schools" in the country.

Blue died at his home in Alexandria, Virginia in 1958 at age 61. He was buried in Arlington National Cemetery. Blue's cause of death was acute congestive heart failure due to bronchopneumonia with chronic arthritis as a contributing condition.

== See also ==
- List of Major League Baseball career triples leaders
- List of Major League Baseball career runs scored leaders
