= Herman Merritt =

American baseball player (1900–1927)

- Shortstop, third baseman
- Born: November 12, 1900; Independence, Kansas
- Died: May 26, 1927 (aged 26); Kansas City, Missouri
- Batted: Right Threw: Right

MLB debut
- August 24, 1921, for the Detroit Tigers

Last MLB appearance
- October 2, 1921, for the Detroit Tigers

MLB statistics
- Games: 20
- Batting average: .370
- Slugging pct.: .478
- Stats at Baseball Reference

Teams
- Detroit Tigers (1921)

Herman G. Merritt (November 12, 1900 – May 26, 1927) was an American baseball player. A native of Independence, Kansas, he played Major League Baseball as a shortstop for the Detroit Tigers in 1921, compiling a .370 batting average in his rookie year. He was paralyzed in an automobile accident the following spring and died five years later at age 26.

== Early years ==
Merritt was born in Independence, Kansas, in 1900.

== Professional baseball ==
=== Detroit Tigers ===
Merritt had his major league debut on August 24, 1921, replacing Donie Bush as the Tigers' shortstop for the last month of the 1921 season. In 20 games, Merritt hit for an impressive .370 batting average with a .478 slugging percentage. However, he did not perform well in the field, having an .882 fielding percentage (60 points lower than the league average in 1921 for shortstops) and a 2.65 range factor (2.50 points lower than the league average that year for shortstops).

=== Augusta Tygers ===
On March 31, 1922, after the Tigers signed Topper Rigney at shortstop, Merritt was farmed out to the minor league Augusta Tygers. Merritt was assigned to play as a third baseman for Augusta. In early April, one newspaper called Merritt as "the Kansas City flash" and added: "If in the league games that are to come, this boy shows a part of the class that he exhibited on Monday afternoon, [Detroit manager] Ty Cobb will have earned the enduring gratitude of the Augusta fans."

=== Automobile accident ===
On April 23, 1922, while returning with four teammates to Augusta after a three-game series in Greenville, North Carolina, the Packard automobile in which they were traveling was overturned 15 miles south of Greenville. The other four players were unhurt. It was initially believed that Merritt had fractured his spine and would not survive, but he underwent surgery the next day, and it was discovered that his spine was not broken, but rather "was jammed between two bones of his broken back", and his lower body showed some sensitivity the next day.

In May 1922, each of the six clubs in the South Atlantic League held a benefit game for Merritt with ten percent of the ticket sales going to Merritt and voluntary contributions also being solicited from fans. He remained in a Greenville hospital for a month, and when he returned to Augusta on May 25, he was greeted at Union Station by 500 baseball fans and admirers. A further benefit game was held for Merritt in Augusta in May, with fans contributing over $700.

== Family and later years ==
Merritt was married. According to a newspaper account, he spent six months in a hospital "strapped to a cot" before finally being moved in December 1922 to his home in Kansas City, Missouri. He died in Kansas City in May 1927 at age 26.
