= Jim Walsh (pitcher) =

American baseball player (1894–1967)

- Pitcher
- Born: July 10, 1894; Roxbury, Massachusetts, U.S.
- Died: May 13, 1967 (aged 72); Boston, Massachusetts, U.S.
- Batted: Left Threw: Left

MLB debut
- August 25, 1921, for the Detroit Tigers

Last MLB appearance
- September 4, 1921, for the Detroit Tigers

MLB statistics
- Win–loss record: 0–0
- Earned run average: 2.25
- Strikeouts: 3
- Stats at Baseball Reference

Teams
- Detroit Tigers (1921)

James Thomas Walsh (July 10, 1894 – May 13, 1967) was an American Major League Baseball pitcher who played in 1921 with the Detroit Tigers. He batted and threw left-handed.

He was born in Roxbury, Massachusetts, and died in Boston, Massachusetts.
