= Red Oldham =

American baseball player (1893–1961)

- Pitcher
- Born: July 15, 1893; Zion, Maryland, U.S.
- Died: January 28, 1961 (aged 67); Costa Mesa, California, U.S.
- Batted: Switch Threw: Left

MLB debut
- August 19, 1914, for the Detroit Tigers

Last MLB appearance
- July 8, 1926, for the Pittsburgh Pirates

MLB statistics
- Win–loss record: 39–48
- Earned run average: 4.15
- Strikeouts: 267
- Stats at Baseball Reference

Teams
- Detroit Tigers (1914–1915, 1920–1922); Pittsburgh Pirates (1925–1926)

Career highlights and awards
- World Series champion (1925)

John Cyrus "Red" Oldham (July 15, 1893 – January 28, 1961) was an American left-handed pitcher in Major League Baseball who played five years with the Detroit Tigers (1914–1915, 1920–1922) and two years with the Pittsburgh Pirates (1925–1926). He pitched the final inning of the 1925 World Series for the Pirates, striking out Goose Goslin to end the game and the series.

== Detroit Tigers ==
Born in Zion, Maryland, Oldham was drafted by the Detroit Tigers on July 31, 1914. Boston Red Sox owner Joseph Lannin bought the Providence Grays and Melrose Park from the Tigers for $75‚000. Detroit got to pick one player from the Providence roster and they selected Oldham‚ overlooking Carl Mays.

Oldham made his debut for the Tigers at age 21 in August 1914 and pitched in nine games for the 1914 team—seven as a starter. He had a record of 2–4 with a 3.38 ERA (Adjusted ERA+ of 83) in 45.3 innings pitched.

In 1915, Oldham played in 17 games for Detroit, only two as a starter. He had a 3–0 record with a 2.81 ERA (Adjusted ERA+ of 107) in 57.7 innings pitched.

On April 5, 1916, the Tigers released Oldham to the San Francisco Seals of the Pacific Coast League "under optional agreement."

Oldham returned to the Tigers in 1920, playing in 39 games, including 22 as a starter. He had a record of 8–13 with a 3.85 ERA (Adjusted ERA+ of 97).

In 1921, Oldham was the #3 starter behind Dutch Leonard and Hooks Dauss on the 1921 Tigers team that set all time American League records with 1724 runs scored and a team batting average of .316. But without pitching, the 1921 team finished in sixth place, 27 games behind the Yankees. With a 4.24 ERA (11-14 record), Oldham had the second lowest ERA on the 1921 team.

In 1921, Ty Cobb became the Tigers' manager. Shortly after an interview in which he told a reporter that "his aim was to use tact and diplomacy" in dealing with players, Cobb called time-out from his position in center field, "ran in, wrested the ball from pitcher Red Oldham's hand, and gave him a dressing-down before calling in a reliever."

Oldham played his final season in Detroit in 1922, going 10–13 with a 4.67 ERA (Adjusted ERA+ of 83).

== Minor leagues ==
On November 24, 1922, The New York Times reported that Oldham, who was under investigation by Judge Landis on the charge of playing winter baseball in Los Angeles, had announced that he would retire from baseball and go into business.

There were also published reports that Odham signed on with the Santa Rita team in the Copper League. It was reported that during the 1924 season, the Santa Rita team had signed up Oldham to pitch. Santa Rita tried to sneak him into the game under the assumed name of Miller. The El Paso team, however, caught them at their game and refused to play if Oldham participated.

== Pittsburgh Pirates ==
Oldham made it back to the big leagues in 1925 with the Pittsburgh Pirates. He appeared in 11 games and had a record of 3–2 in 53 innings pitched. His ERA in 1925 was 3.91, well below the league average, for a career high Adjusted ERA+ of 115.

Oldham accompanied the Pirates to the 1925 World Series against the Washington Senators. He pitched the final inning of Game 7 on October 15, 1925, before 42,856 fans at Forbes Field in Pittsburgh. In the 8th inning, AL MVP Roger Peckinpaugh homered to put the Senators on top 7–6. In the bottom of the 8th inning, the Pirates scored three runs to take a 9–7 lead. Then, in the top of the 9th inning, Oldham entered the game with the heart of the Washington lineup coming to bat. Oldham proceeded to pitch a masterful 1-2-3 inning against three future Hall of Famers. He struck out Sam Rice looking, got Bucky Harris on a lineout to second base, and finished the game by striking out Goose Goslin looking. The Pirates won the game and the World Series with Oldham on the mound. Walter Johnson was the losing pitcher for the Senators.

In 1926, Oldham's ERA soared to a career high 5.64 (Adjusted ERA+ of 70). He played his last major league game on July 8, 1926.

== Career statistics and death ==
In his seven major league seasons, Oldham appeared in 176 games (92 as a starter) and had a record of 39–48 with 292 walks, 267 strikeouts, and an ERA of 4.15.

Oldham was a better than average hitting pitcher, posting a .226 batting average (64-for-283) with 35 runs, 2 home runs, 30 RBIs and 22 bases on balls. He had 13 RBI in 1922 as a member of the Tigers.

Oldham died in Costa Mesa, California at age 67 in 1961.
