= Jackie Tavener =

American baseball player (1897–1969)

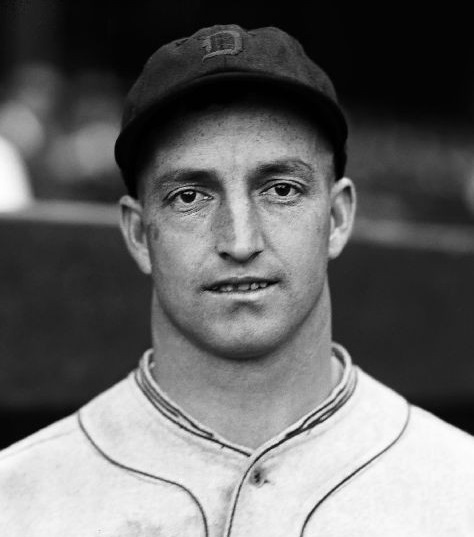
- Shortstop
- Born: December 27, 1897; Celina, Ohio, U.S.
- Died: September 14, 1969 (aged 71); Fort Worth, Texas, U.S.
- Batted: Left Threw: Right

MLB debut
- September 24, 1921, for the Detroit Tigers

Last MLB appearance
- October 6, 1929, for the Cleveland Indians

MLB statistics
- Batting average: .255
- Home runs: 13
- Runs batted in: 243
- Stats at Baseball Reference

Teams
- Detroit Tigers (1921, 1925–1928); Cleveland Indians (1929)

John Adam "Jackie" Tavener (December 27, 1897 – September 14, 1969), nicknamed "Rabbit", was an American professional baseball player from 1921 to 1934. He played all or parts of six seasons in Major League Baseball as a shortstop for the Detroit Tigers (1921, 1925–1928) and Cleveland Indians (1929).

Tavener was known as one of the smallest men ever to play in the major leagues and was rejected for that reason by Detroit manager Ty Cobb after a two-game tryout in 1921. When he rejoined the Tigers in 1925, Tavener became one of the American League's best defensive shortstops, ranking among the league leaders every year from 1925 to 1928 in putouts, assists, double plays and fielding percentage. Despite a career batting average of .255, Tavener could hit with power and was among the league leaders in triples in 1925, 1926 and 1928. He is also one of only four players in major league history (Baseball Hall of Fame inductees Ty Cobb, Honus Wagner and Max Carey are the others) to steal second, third and home in the same inning on more than one occasion.

Tavener also played six seasons with the Fort Worth Panthers in the Texas League and became one of the most popular Panther players. He played on Fort Worth teams that won three pennants and two Dixie Series championships from 1922 to 1924. Tavener later settled in Fort Worth, where he was the proprietor of a bowling alley known as "Tavener's Playdium."

== Professional baseball career ==
=== Cobb passes due to Tavener's size ===
Born in Celina, Ohio, Tavener began his professional baseball career in the "Sally League" playing for the Columbia Comers in Columbia, South Carolina. He appeared in 142 games at the shortstop position for Columbia and compiled a .290 batting average with 29 doubles and 13 triples. Although his fielding percentage was .926, he accepted 808 chances and had 280 putouts and 468 assists. His range and skill at the shortstop position immediately earned him a reputation as "just about the sweetest fielder in the minors."

Tavener's performance in Columbia drew attention from the major leagues. Clark Griffith of the Washington Senators sent a scout to Columbia to take a look at Tavener. The scout saw Tavener's teammate, Goose Goslin, who was batting .390, and signed him instead of Tavener.

In September 1921, the Detroit Tigers purchased Tavener from Columbia for $6,500 and gave him a tryout. At the time, Tavener was 5-feet, 5-inches tall and weighed only 128 pounds. When Tavener reported to Detroit, manager Ty Cobb immediately concluded that Tavener was too small to play in the major leagues. Interviewed in 1942, Tavener recounted Cobb's comments:

Kid, you've come to us with a reputation of being a smart player and one of the best fielders in the minors, but your size is against you. You just aren't big enough to make the club.

Tavener appeared in only two games for Detroit. He had no hits in four at bats, but had a perfect 1.000 fielding percentage with three putouts and four assists. Tavener believed he played as well as any infielder in workouts, but "Cobb couldn't get away from the conviction that a runt like me wasn't capable of sticking with a big league team." Tavener concluded that he had been ready in 1921, but Cobb's conviction caused a three-year delay in Tavener's major league career. While Tavener eventually bulked up to 138 pounds, at 5-feet, 5-inches, he remained "one of the smallest men ever to play in the majors." He was sometimes referred to in newspapers or by fans as "the midget," the "Tom Thumb shortstop," or "Pee Wee."

=== Fort Worth Panthers ===
After his brief tryout, the Detroit Tigers assigned Tavener to the Fort Worth Panthers in the Texas League. For the next three years, from 1922 to 1924, Tavener was the starting shortstop for teams that won three consecutive Texas League pennants and two Dixie Series championships. Indeed, the 1922 and 1924 Panthers, with records of 109-46 and 109–41, have been rated as the 17th and 4th best minor league team of all time.

Tavener became "one of the most popular Panther players during the 1920s." In 1922, Tavener had 55 RBIs, nine triples, and 17 stolen bases, and drew 70 bases on balls. He had his best season at Fort Worth in 1924. That year, he compiled a .285 batting average with 22 doubles, seven triples, and four home runs. He also led the Texas League in 1924 with 844 chances accepted, 552 assists, and 95 double plays, and he was second among the league's shortstops with a .951 fielding percentage.

=== Detroit Tigers ===
==== 1925 season ====
In 1925, Cobb was still the manager of the Tigers, but Tavener had proved himself in Fort Worth. Accordingly, Tavener rejoined the Tigers in 1925. Topper Rigney had been entrenched as Detroit's starting shortstop since 1922, but Tavener quickly took the job from him. During the 1925 season, Tavener started 130 games at shortstop, with Rigney starting only 26 games. Tavener compiled a somewhat disappointing .245 batting average in 1925, but his 11 doubles, 11 triples, and 47 RBIs were encouraging. His defensive performance provided even more cause for optimism. Despite being a starter for less than the full season, Tavener was one of the defensive leaders among the American League's shortstops with a .963 fielding percentage (2nd), 73 double plays (4th), 229 putouts (4th), and 398 assists (4th).

At the end of the 1925 season, veteran Detroit sports writer Sam Greene was ebullient in his praise for Tavener's defensive performance:

"The midget from Fort Worth proceeded to show Detroit fans the flashiest work at shortstop they had seen since Donie Bush was in his prime. He cut off base hit after base hit, going now far to his right side and now to his left. When occasion demanded, he roamed into left field for fly balls that previously had gone for base hits. While Tavener was a light hitter, his defensive skill more than off-set his weakness on attack. Detroit . . . needed someone to discourage the offense of the opposition. Tavener did that as few young infielders have ever done it."

==== 1926 season ====
In 1926, Tavener played all 156 games at shortstop for Detroit. He increased his batting average by 20 points over the prior year to .265 and contributed 22 doubles, 14 triples (5th most in the league), 58 RBIs, 52 bases on balls, and 28 sacrifice hits (3rd most in the league). He was paired in 1926 with Detroit's rookie second baseman Charlie Gehringer, and the pair became "a formidable defensive duo up the middle for Detroit." In August 1926, Sam Greene in The Sporting News wrote: "In going after a ground ball or a fly ball, Tavener is without peer in the American League. He has a throwing arm that is without equal." With Gehringer's support, Tavener led the American League with 92 double plays turned in 1926. He also ranked second among the league's shortstops with 300 putouts and 470 assists.

At the end of the 1926 season, Sam Greene continued his high praise of Tavener in The Sporting News. Greene declared unequivocally that "Tavener is the best fielding shortstop in the league." Moreover, Greene noted that Tavener had improved as a batter and had developed a knack for hitting with men on base, making him "a feared batsman in the pinch."

==== 1927 season ====
Tavener's 1927 season was, in fairness, two seasons. During the first half, he played as well as he ever had. Under new head coach George Moriarty, the Tigers improved substantially, and in July 1927, The Sporting News credited Tavener as "an imposing factor in the recent climb of the club," as he consistently "provided exceptional strength on defense and recently his batting has become a menace to opposing pitchers."

However, Tavener missed some 40 games during the 1927 season, principally due to an off-the-playing-field injury that eventually cut short his major league career. Tavener slashed the index finger of his throwing hand while "fumbling around in the ice box of his house one evening." The wound healed, but Tavener lost feeling in the tip of his finger. The condition handicapped his throwing ability and reportedly "provided a mental hazard that affected his general play." He finished second to Harry Heilmann in the voting for the Most Valuable Player (MVP) on the Tigers, and Sam Greene wrote that the finger injury took away any shot Tavener had for being selected MVP. Greene wrote that Tavener was forced out of the infield for two months, and when he returned, "he was not right." According to Greene, "His finger was lifeless and he could not throw accurately. Many a base runner reached first base because Tavener was handicapped in his gripping the ball."

Despite the handicap, Tavener finished 13th in the voting for the American League Most Valuable Player Award. He finished the 1927 season with career highs in batting average (.274), RBIs (59), stolen bases (19), and home runs (5). And despite missing two months from the infield, he was still one of the leading American League shortstops with 79 double plays (3rd), a .948 fielding percentage (3rd) and a 5.28 range factor (4th).

==== 1928 season ====
In 1928, Tavener returned as the Tigers' starting shortstop for the fourth year. He appeared in 131 games at the position and led the American League's shortstops with a 5.50 range factor, 0.66 points higher than the average shortstop that year. He also ranked second in assists (405) and putouts (302). However, his fielding percentage continued a slide begun with the injury in 1927. His 1928 fielding percentage of .944 was nearly 20 points below his 1925 figure, and his 42 errors were a career high.

Tavener also performed well at the plate in 1928. He collected career highs with 24 doubles, 15 triples and five home runs. His 15 triples was fifth best in the American League. Tavener's ability to collect extra-base hits was a function not only of his speed and strength, but also of opponents underestimating him due to his small size. Sports writer Sam Greene reported that Tavener "walloped the ball with astonishing strength" but noted that "[t]ime and again we have seen opposing outfielders play in for Tavener, only to have him drive the ball beyond them for extra bases."

Tavener's most memorable accomplishments during the 1928 season came as a base runner. His 19 stolen bases ranked eighth in the league. He also became only the fourth player in major league history (Baseball Hall of Fame inductees Ty Cobb, Honus Wagner and Max Carey are the others) to steal second, third and home in the same inning on more than one occasion. He first accomplished the feat on July 10, 1927, against the New York Yankees. He repeated on July 25, 1928, also against the Yankees. No player has accomplished the feat more than once since Tavener did it in 1927 and 1928.

=== Cleveland Indians ===
In December 1928, the Tigers traded Tavener with Ken Holloway to the Cleveland Indians for pitcher George Uhle. The trade was controversial among Cleveland fans, as Uhle was a fan favorite who had won 147 game in Cleveland, including a 27-win season in 1926. The Indians sought to justify the trade by pointing out that Tavener had always hit well at Cleveland's Dunn Field with its short right-field wall. Cleveland sports writer Francis J. Powers noted that Tavener had always played "a whale of a game" at Dunn Field and predicted that he would bat .300 playing there for 77 games. Powers also pointed out that Tavener had more triples (18) and home runs (5) in 1928 than any of the Indians players, and more than a third of Tavener's hits went for extra bases.

Despite the best hopes of Cleveland's management and Francis J. Powers, the trade proved to be disastrous for the Indians. Tavener started only 67 games at shortstop in 1929, losing the starting job to rookie Ray Gardner. And far from hitting .300 at Dunn Field, Tavener compiled a career low batting average of .212, 50 points lower than Tavener had averaged at Detroit. Tavener appeared in his final major league game on October 6, 1929. Detroit sports writer Sam Greene opined that Tavener's decline actually began with his finger injury in 1927: "The fact remains, however, that Tavener never regained the fielding and all-around skill he had known prior to the accident."

=== Return to minors ===
Tavener was released by the Indians after the 1929 season and returned to the Fort Worth Panthers in 1930. He again became the Panthers' starting shortstop and compiled a .274 batting average with 23 doubles and 14 triples in 1930. He next played two seasons as the starting shortstop for the Milwaukee Brewers of the American Association in 1931 and 1932. Proving that he still had power in his swing, Tavener, at age 34, contributed 30 doubles, 10 triples and a career high 15 home runs in 1931. He returned to the Fort Worth Panthers in 1933 and concluded his professional baseball career as a back-up shortstop during the 1933 and 1934 seasons.

== Family and later years ==
Tavener was married in 1924. He and his wife had no children. For 37 years starting in the early 1930s, Tavener owned a bowling alley called "Tavener's Playdium" on Camp Bowie Boulevard in Fort Worth, Texas. In 1942, The Sporting News reported that Tavener's holdings had expanded to two bowling alleys, which were among "the finest bowling establishments in the Southwest." Tavener was himself an avid bowler who insisted in 1942 that he bowled better than any of his customers.

Tavner died in September 1969 in Fort Worth at age 71, and was buried at Greenwood Memorial Park in Fort Worth.
