= Rip Collins (pitcher) =

American baseball player (1896–1968)

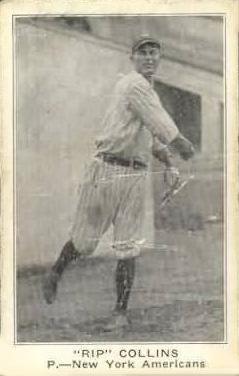
- Pitcher
- Born: February 26, 1896; Weatherford, Texas, U.S.
- Died: May 27, 1968 (aged 72); Bryan, Texas, U.S.
- Batted: Right Threw: Right

MLB debut
- April 19, 1920, for the New York Yankees

Last MLB appearance
- August 26, 1931, for the St. Louis Browns

MLB statistics
- Win–loss record: 108–82
- Earned run average: 3.99
- Strikeouts: 569
- Stats at Baseball Reference

Teams
- New York Yankees (1920–1921); Boston Red Sox (1922); Detroit Tigers (1923–1927); St. Louis Browns (1929–1931)

Harry Warren "Rip" Collins (February 26, 1896 – May 27, 1968) was an American Major League Baseball pitcher with the New York Yankees, Boston Red Sox, Detroit Tigers and the St. Louis Browns between 1920 and 1931. Collins batted and threw right-handed.

Collins was born in the small city of Weatherford, Texas, a longtime seat of Parker County. Attending Texas A&M University, Collins was a four-sport star, chiefly known for his ability as a football punter.

In 1919, Collins became a starting pitcher for the Double-A Dallas Rangers of the Texas League. A year later, he joined the New York Yankees.

Collins was a 14-game winner three times during his major league career (in his 1920 rookie season with the Yankees, for the Boston Red Sox in 1922, and with the Detroit Tigers in 1924). A member of the 1921 American League champion Yankees team, he relieved in Game Three of the World Series won by the New York Giants in seven games. He finished his major league career with the St. Louis Browns in 1931.

Collins and his former Texas A&M teammate Topper Rigney played together for the Detroit Tigers from 1923 to 1925.

In an 11-season career, Collins posted a 108–82 record with 569 strikeouts and a 3.99 ERA in 1711.1 innings pitched.

Collins returned to the Texas League in 1933 to play one season with the Fort Worth Cats and then retired from baseball.

Following his playing career Collins joined the Texas Ranger Division. He was elected Travis County sheriff in 1940 and served for eight years. Then became police chief of the Brazos County city of Bryan in 1950 and retired from law enforcement work in 1959. Chief Collins was one of the first Little League Baseball managers in Bryan.

Collins died in Bryan on May 27, 1968 at the age of 72.
