= Chicken Hawks =

American baseball player (1896–1973)

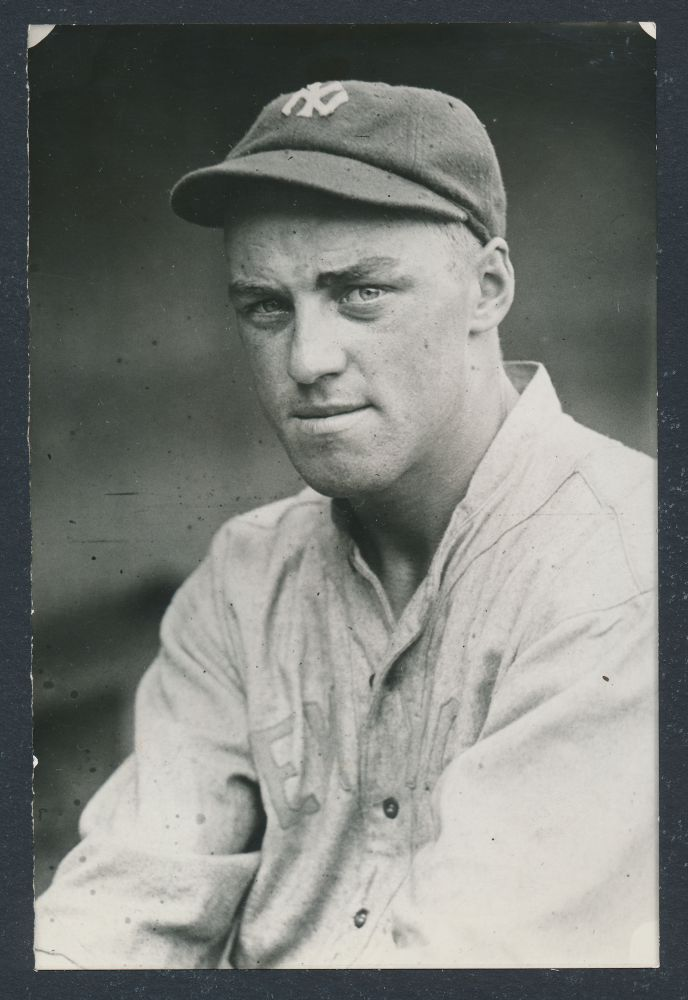
- First baseman
- Born: February 3, 1896; San Francisco, California, U.S.
- Died: May 26, 1973 (aged 77); San Rafael, California, U.S.
- Batted: Left Threw: Left

MLB debut
- April 14, 1921, for the New York Yankees

Last MLB appearance
- September 27, 1925, for the Philadelphia Phillies

MLB statistics
- Batting average: .316
- Home runs: 7
- Runs batted in: 60
- Stats at Baseball Reference

Teams
- New York Yankees (1921); Philadelphia Phillies (1925)

Nelson Louis "Chicken" Hawks (February 3, 1896 – May 26, 1973) was an American professional baseball player whose career spanned 14 seasons, two of which were spent with the Major League Baseball (MLB) New York Yankees (1921) and Philadelphia Phillies (1925). Hawks played as a first baseman for the Phillies and an outfielder for the Yankees. Over his career, Hawks compiled a career batting average of .316 with 68 runs scored, 124 hits, 17 doubles, eight triples, seven home runs, and 60 runs batted in over 146 games played. He played the majority of his career (12 seasons) in minor league baseball. He made his major-league debut at the age of 25 and was officially listed as standing 5 feet 11 inches (180 cm) and weighing 167 pounds (76 kg).

== Early life ==
Hawks was born on February 3, 1896, in San Francisco, California. He attended Santa Clara University from 1915 to 1920.

== Professional career ==
Hawks began his professional baseball career in 1918, when he played for the Oakland Oaks of the Pacific Coast League. He hit .248 over the season, with a home run and two triples. The following year, under manager Del Howard, Hawks recorded a perfect 1.000 batting average, with two hits in two at-bats over a game played. Next season he moved to the Calgary Bronchos, where he hit a Western Canada League-leading .359 off of a league-leading 161 hits. In 1921, Hawks made his MLB debut for the New York Yankees; for the Yankees, Hawks hit .288 with two home runs and 15 RBIs. After one-year stints with the Vernon Tigers, the Nashville Volunteers, and the St. Paul Saints, Hawks returned to the Volunteers for the 1924 season, where he hit a team-best .336 batting average, along with a .494 slugging percentage, second best on the Volunteers to Bevo LeBourveau's .536.

In his second MLB season, Hawks played for the Philadelphia Philles. Over the course of the year, Hawks hit .322, good for fifth best on the team. On September 8 of that season, he broke up a no-hitter by Dazzy Vance with a hit in the bottom of the second inning in an otherwise hit-less game for the Phillies. In Vance's next start against the Phillies, Hawks broke up a shutout when he scored on a sacrifice fly ball after moving to third base on an error by Jimmy Johnston.

After his season with the Phillies, Hawks played for the Newark Bears, Reading Keystones, Buffalo Bisons, San Francisco Seals, and Mission Reds until his retirement in 1931.

== After baseball ==
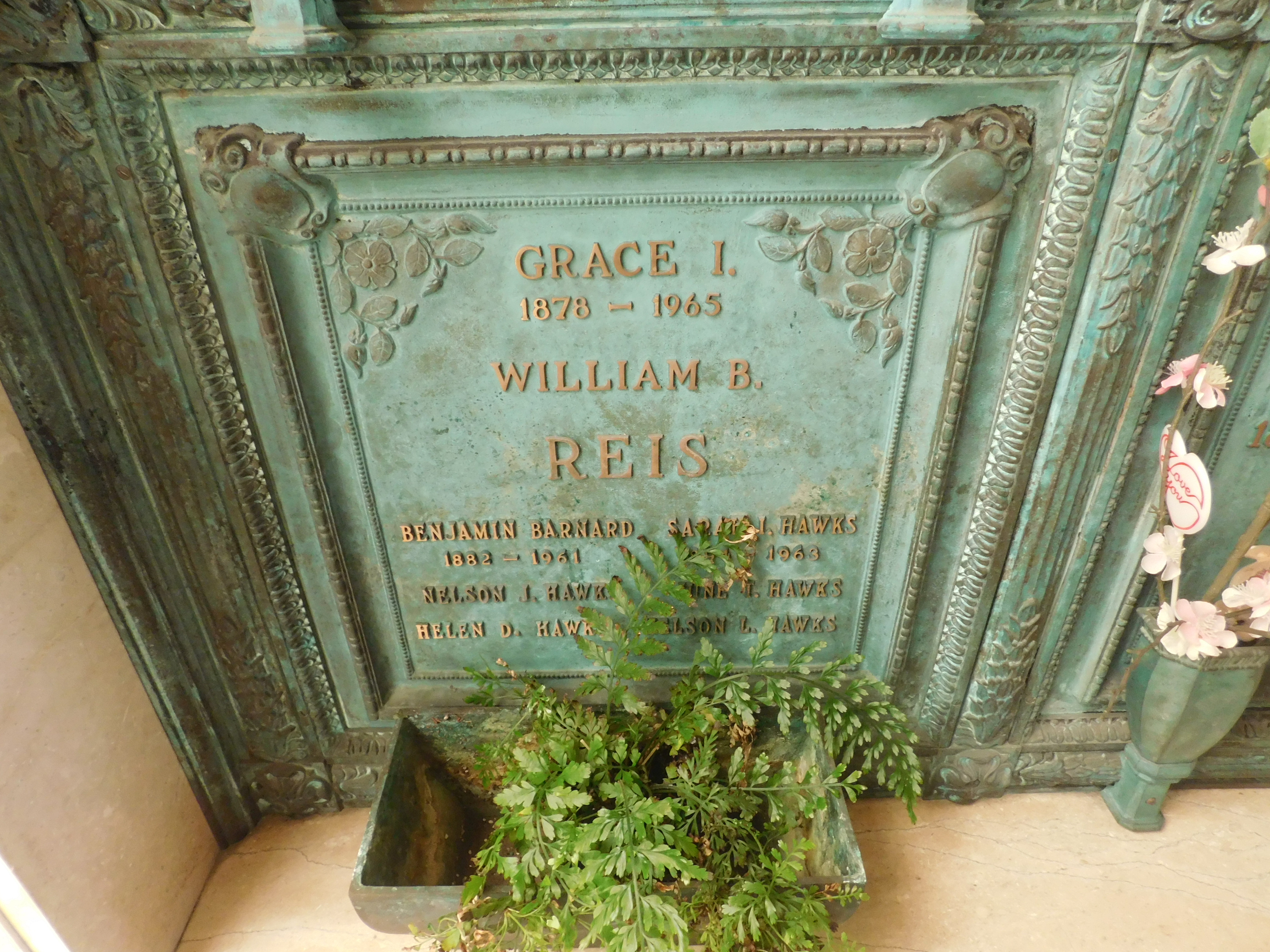
The grave of Chicken Hawks at Cypress Lawn Memorial Park

.

After retiring from baseball, Hawks died from a heart attack on May 26, 1973, at Kaiser Hospital in San Rafael, California after years of pulmonary problems. He is interred at Cypress Lawn Memorial Park in Colma, California.
