= George Uhle =

American baseball player (1898–1985)

- Uhle in 1921
- Pitcher
- Born: September 18, 1898; Cleveland, Ohio, U.S.
- Died: February 26, 1985 (aged 86); Lakewood, Ohio, U.S.
- Batted: Right Threw: Right

MLB debut
- April 30, 1919, for the Cleveland Indians

Last MLB appearance
- September 22, 1936, for the Cleveland Indians

MLB statistics
- Win–loss record: 200–166
- Earned run average: 3.99
- Strikeouts: 1,135
- Stats at Baseball Reference

Teams
- Cleveland Indians (1919–1928, 1936); Detroit Tigers (1929–1933); New York Giants (1933); New York Yankees (1933–1934)

Career highlights and awards
- World Series champion (1920); 2× AL wins leader (1923, 1926)

George Ernest Uhle (September 18, 1898 – February 26, 1985) was an American Major League Baseball pitcher. Born in Cleveland, Ohio, he began his playing career with his hometown Cleveland Indians. After ten seasons, during which time he led the American League in wins, innings pitched, complete games, shutouts, and games started, he was traded in 1928 to the Detroit Tigers for Jackie Tavener and Ken Holloway. He went on to play with the New York Giants, New York Yankees, and again with the Indians. When his career ended in 1936, he had won 200 games. His lifetime batting average of .289 (393-for-1360) is still a record for a pitcher (not playing at any other position)

On May 25, 1929, the Detroit Tigers defeated the Chicago White Sox 6–5 in 21 innings. Uhle, who was the winning pitcher, pitched twenty innings to earn his eighth win of the season with no losses. The losing pitcher, Ted Lyons, pitched all 21 innings for Chicago.

Babe Ruth himself credited George with being the toughest pitcher he ever faced, although Ruth batted .336 against Uhle. Out of 714 career home runs, he got only four off Uhle. Uhle had the second most strikeouts of Ruth by a pitcher, with 25. Only Lefty Grove had more, with 27.

Uhle's son, George, Jr., played minor league baseball in the Boston Braves' organization for a few years.

Uhle was buried at Lakewood Park Cemetery in Rocky River, Ohio.

== See also ==
- List of Major League Baseball career wins leaders
- List of Major League Baseball annual wins leaders
- List of Major League Baseball career hit batsmen leaders
