= Topper Rigney =

American baseball player (1897–1972)

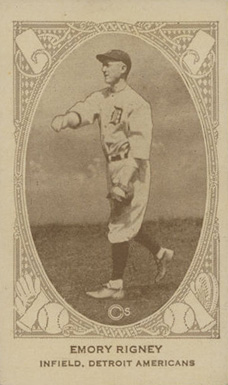
- Shortstop
- Born: January 7, 1897; Groveton, Texas, U.S.
- Died: June 6, 1972 (aged 75); San Antonio, Texas, U.S.
- Batted: Right Threw: Right

MLB debut
- April 12, 1922, for the Detroit Tigers

Last MLB appearance
- August 26, 1927, for the Washington Senators

MLB statistics
- Batting average: .288
- Home runs: 13
- Runs batted in: 312
- Stats at Baseball Reference

Teams
- Detroit Tigers (1922–1925); Boston Red Sox (1926–1927); Washington Senators (1927)

Emory Elmo "Topper" Rigney (January 7, 1897 – June 6, 1972) was an American professional baseball player between 1920 and 1928. He played six seasons in Major League Baseball as a shortstop for the Detroit Tigers (1922–1925), Boston Red Sox (1926–1927), and Washington Senators (1927).

A Texas native, Rigney served in the U.S. Navy and played two years in the Texas League before making his major league debut in 1922 at age 25. During his six-year major league career, Rigney ranked among the American League leaders in sacrifice hits four times. He was also among the league leaders in bases on balls three times, leading to his impressive on-base percentages of .410 in 1924 and .395 in 1926. Rigney also had good speed on the base paths and ranked among the league leaders in triples twice and was once among the leaders in stolen bases. He had a career batting average of .288 and .388 on-base percentage.

Rigney also ranked among the American League's best defensive shortstops in the 1920s. He led the league's shortstops in fielding percentage in 1924 and 1926 and also led the league with 492 assists in 1926. His 1926 range factor per game of 5.33 was tops among shortstops in that category as well.

== Early years ==
Rigney was born in Groveton, Texas, in 1897. His father, Robert Rigney, was a dry goods merchant in Leonard, Texas, in 1910, and a real estate agent in 1920. Rigney attended Texas A&M University, playing at the shortstop position for the Texas A&M baseball team from 1915 to 1918. He attained the rank of colonel in the Texas A&M Corps of Cadets and was also captain of the Ross Volunteers. Rigney then served in the U. S. Navy in 1918 and 1919 and listed his occupation as real estate agent in the 1920 United States Census.

== Professional baseball career ==
=== Texas League ===
After graduating from Texas A&M, Rigney signed with the Detroit Tigers. In 1920, he was farmed out to the Texas League and began his professional baseball career with the Dallas Submarines. Rigney compiled a .253 batting average with 16 doubles, 10 triples and 3 home runs in 122 games for Dallas.

Rigney next played for a Fort Worth Panthers team that finished the 1921 season with a 107–51 record. Rigney hit .292, drew 63 walks, scored 91 runs, and tallied 81 RBIs, 30 doubles, 12 triples and 10 home runs. Rigney also led all Texas League shortstops with a .946 fielding percentage and 547 assists.

=== Detroit Tigers ===
In 1922 Rigney joined the Detroit Tigers at age 25. He was the team's starting shortstop in all 155 games during the 1922 season; he replaced Donie Bush, who had been the Tigers starting shortstop from 1909 to 1921. In his rookie season, Rigney compiled a .300 batting average and a .380 on-base percentage with 17 doubles, seven triples, two home runs, 17 stolen bases, and 63 RBIs. Rigney and his former Texas A&M teammate Rip Collins both played together for the Tigers from 1923 to 1925.

In 1923, Rigney increased his batting average to .315 with a .389 on-base percentage and 24 doubles, 11 triples, 74 RBIs, and 7 stolen bases. Rigney's strong performance in 1923 was in spite of a hip ailment that plagued him through much of the season. Doctors were unable to determine the cause of the problem, and when the problem returned early in 1924, Detroit manager Ty Cobb sent Rigney to the Mayo Brothers' Clinic in Rochester, Minnesota. The doctors there were similarly unable to diagnose Rigney's condition until, after a few days, they examined his teeth. The doctors discovered that Rigney had a number of infected molars that had spread poison throughout his system with the poison "making its headquarters in that bum hip." After the extraction of the infected teeth, Rigney's hip problem was cured.

With the hip problem behind him, Rigney had a solid season in 1924. He had a career high 94 RBIs and drew 102 walks (second only to Babe Ruth in the American League), giving him a .410 on-base percentage. His .410 on-base percentage in 1924 is the highest by a shortstop in Detroit Tigers history. He also led the American League's shortstops in 1924 with a .967 fielding percentage.

Rigney lost his role as the Tigers' starting shortstop in 1925, as Jackie Tavener took over and started 130 games at the position. Rigney started only 26 games at shortstop in 1925, compiling a .247 batting average (.341 on-base percentage) in 146 at bats.

=== Boston Red Sox ===
In April 1926, Rigney was sold to the Boston Red Sox, reportedly after an argument with Tigers player-manager Ty Cobb. In 1926, Rigney played well for the Red Sox and received three vote points in voting for the American League Most Valuable Player Award. That year, he compiled a .270 batting average, and his 108 bases on balls (third in the American League) boosted his on-base percentage to .395. Rigney also hit a career high 32 doubles in 1926. Defensively, he led the American League's shortstops in assists (492), fielding percentage (.969) and range factor per game (5.33).

=== Washington Senators ===
In May 1927, Rigney was traded to the Washington Senators for Buddy Myer. The trade is widely regarded as one of the worst trades in baseball history, as Rigney played only 45 more games before his major league career ended, while Myer played another 15 years in the major leagues and became an All-Star (albeit most of those years for the Senators who traded him away). Rigney finished his major league career with the Senators at age 30. He appeared in his final major league game on August 26, 1927.

=== Kansas City Blues ===
Rigney concluded his professional baseball career in 1928 playing for the Kansas City Blues of the American Association. He compiled a .250 batting average in 296 at bats with nine doubles and five triples.

=== Career statistics ===
Rigney led American League shortstops in fielding percentage in 1924 (.967) and in assists (492) and fielding percentage (.969) in 1926. In 1926, he set an American League record by handling 24 chances without an error in a double-header. His range factor of 5.33 in 1926 was 0.69 points above the American League average for shortstops that year, and his .969 fielding average was .025 points above the league average .944.

Playing for the hit-and-run oriented Detroit manager Ty Cobb, Rigney was among the American League leaders in sacrifice hits four times in 1922 (37), 1923 (33), 1924 (31), and 1926 (26). Six Tigers from the Cobb era (Donie Bush, Ty Cobb, Harry Heilmann, Bobby Veach, Sam Crawford, and Ossie Vitt) rank in the top 50 all time for sacrifice hits.

In 694 games played, Rigney compiled a .288 batting average (669 hits in 2,326 at bats) with 325 runs scored, 13 home runs, 312 RBI, an on-base percentage of .388 and a slugging percentage of .387 over six seasons. His career fielding percentage was .953.

== Family and later years ==
Rigney was married to Thelma Routh in 1920. They had a son, Robert, who was born in approximately 1932. After retiring from baseball at the end of the 1928 season, Rigney went into the insurance business in the Lower Rio Grande Valley. They lived in Harlingen, Texas. Rigney also served as the player-manager of the Harlingen baseball team in 1930. After 12 years in the Rio Grande Valley, Rigney moved to San Antonio. In 1953, he was reportedly part of an investor syndicate that acquired control of the Omaha and Council Bluffs Street Railway Company.

Rigney died in June 1972 at a San Antonio hospital at age 75. He was survived by his wife, Thelma, and their son, Robert.
