= Andy Harrington (pinch hitter) =

American baseball player (1903–1979)

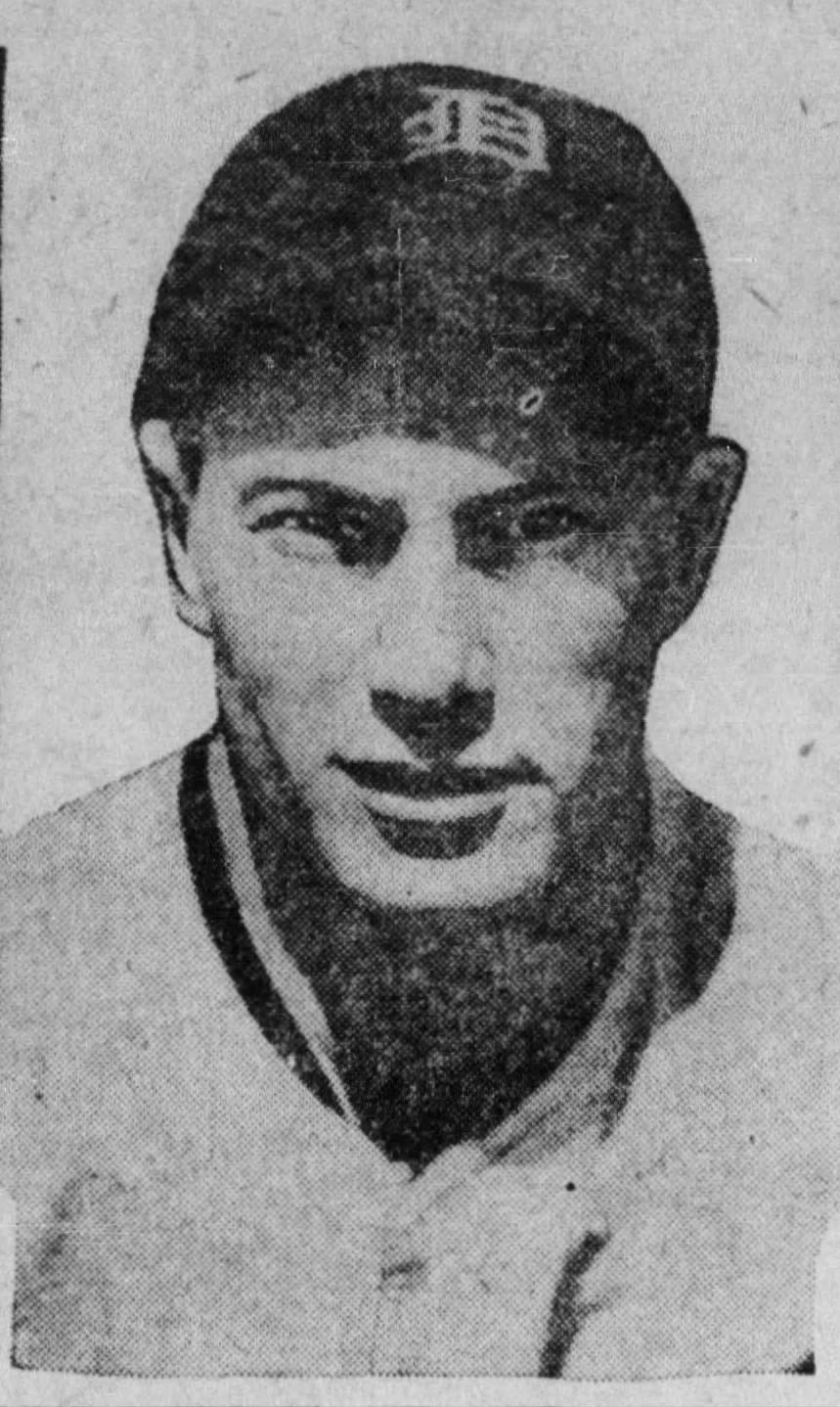
- Pinch hitter
- Born: February 12, 1903; Mountain View, California, U.S.
- Died: January 29, 1979 (aged 75); Boise, Idaho, U.S.
- Batted: Right Threw: Right

MLB debut
- April 18, 1925, for the Detroit Tigers

Last MLB appearance
- April 18, 1925, for the Detroit Tigers

MLB statistics
- Games played: 1
- At bats: 1
- Hits: 0
- Stats at Baseball Reference

Teams
- Detroit Tigers (1925)

Andrew Matthew Harrington (February 12, 1903 – January 29, 1979) was an American Major League Baseball player who played in one game for the Detroit Tigers on April 18, 1925. He was used as a pinch hitter for one at bat, and did not reach base.
