= Ken Holloway =

American baseball player (1897–1968)

- Pitcher
- Born: August 8, 1897; Thomas County, Georgia, U.S.
- Died: September 25, 1968 (aged 71); Thomasville, Georgia, U.S.
- Batted: Right Threw: Right

MLB debut
- August 27, 1922, for the Detroit Tigers

Last MLB appearance
- September 19, 1930, for the New York Yankees

MLB statistics
- Win–loss record: 64–52
- Earned run average: 4.40
- Strikeouts: 293
- Stats at Baseball Reference

Teams
- Detroit Tigers (1922–1928); Cleveland Indians (1929–1930); New York Yankees (1930)

Kenneth Eugene Holloway (August 8, 1897 – September 25, 1968) was an American baseball pitcher. A native of Barwick, Georgia, he played college baseball at the University of Georgia. He then played 11 years in professional baseball as a right-handed pitcher from 1922 to 1932, including nine years in Major League Baseball for the Detroit Tigers (1920–1928), Cleveland Indians (1929–1930), and New York Yankees (1930).

== Early years ==
Holloway was born in Barwick, Georgia, in 1897. He attended the University of Georgia. In May 1918, he was picked by the Auburn baseball coach in The Atlanta Constitution as a pitcher on the all-star nine of college baseball. Listed at 6 ft 0 in (1.83 m), 185 lb., Holloway batted and threw right-handed.

== Professional baseball ==
A curveball specialist, Holloway entered the majors in 1922 with the Detroit Tigers, remaining with the club for seven years from 1922 to 1928. He appeared in 237 games for the Tigers, 97 of them as a starter and the rest as a relief pitcher. He compiled 57–46 win–loss record and a 4.41 earned run average (ERA) with the Tigers. His best seasons were 1924 and 1925 when he compiled a combined 27–10 record with a 4.33 ERA. His .700 winning percentage in 1924 was second only to Walter Johnson, and his .765 winning percentage in 1924 was second only to Stan Coveleski. His nine relief victories led the American League in 1924.

In December 1928, Holloway and Jackie Tavener were traded to the Cleveland Indians in exchange for pitcher George Uhle. Holloway appeared in 25 games for the 1928 Indians, 11 as a starter, and compiled a 6–5 record with a career low 3.03 ERA. In 1930, he began the season with Cleveland, appearing in 28 games and compiling a 1–1 record with a career high 8.40 ERA.

On June 30, 1930, Holloway was claimed by the New York Yankees on waivers from the Indians. He appeared in 16 games for the 1930 Yankees, all in relief, had no decision, and compiled a 5.24 ERA in 34 1/3 innings pitched.

In nine major league seasons, Holloway posted a 64–52 win–loss record with 293 strikeouts and a 4.40 ERA in 285 appearances, including 110 starts, 43 complete games, four shutouts, 18 saves, and 1,160 innings pitched.

In November 1930, Holloway was traded by the Yankees to the Baltimore Orioles of the International League. He compiled a 15–8 record with a 4.34 ERA in 1931 and a 13–13 record with a 5.29 ERA in 1932.

== Later years ==
Holloway died in Thomasville, Georgia, at age 71.
