= Larry Woodall =

American baseball player (1894–1963)

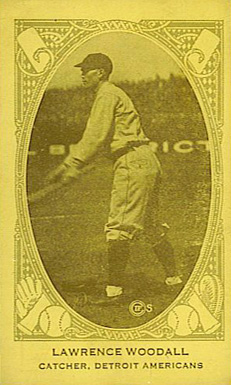
- Catcher
- Born: July 26, 1894; Staunton, Virginia, U.S.
- Died: May 6, 1963 (aged 68); Cambridge, Massachusetts, U.S.
- Batted: Right Threw: Right

MLB debut
- May 20, 1920, for the Detroit Tigers

Last MLB appearance
- May 9, 1929, for the Detroit Tigers

MLB statistics
- Batting average: .268
- Home runs: 1
- Runs batted in: 161
- Stats at Baseball Reference

Teams
- Detroit Tigers (1920–1929)

Charles Lawrence Woodall (July 26, 1894 – May 6, 1963) was an American professional baseball player and coach. He played ten seasons in Major League Baseball, all in the American League with the Detroit Tigers (1920–1929), primarily as a catcher.

== Life ==
Born in Staunton, Virginia, he attended Wake Forest University and the University of North Carolina.

== Career ==
During most of Woodall's playing career, he played behind two starting catchers of the Tigers, Johnny Bassler and Oscar Stanage. For one season in 1927, however, he played a career-high 86 games at catcher during manager George Moriarty's first season. Woodall posted a .997 fielding percentage (committing one error), the best percentage among all starting catchers that season. He hit over .300 in three seasons and had a career batting average of .268 in 548 games. Woodall batted and threw right-handed.

After his major league career was over, Woodall spent ten seasons in the Pacific Coast League. In 1930–31, he played for the Portland Beavers, including a stint as player-manager in 1930. He moved on to the Sacramento Senators in 1932–33, then put in six seasons with the San Francisco Seals from 1934 to 1939.

Woodall's post-playing career included more than two decades with the Boston Red Sox, as a coach (1942–1948, including service on Boston's 1946 pennant-winning team), director of public relations, and scout. In 1949, he scouted Willie Mays but reported that Mays "was not the Red Sox' type of player." Woodall remained a Red Sox employee until his death at age 68 in Cambridge, Massachusetts.

== See also ==
- List of Major League Baseball players who spent their entire career with one franchise

Sporting positions
Preceded by Moe Berg	Boston Red Sox first-base coach 1942–1947	Succeeded by Earle Combs
