= Bert Cole =

American baseball player (1896–1975)

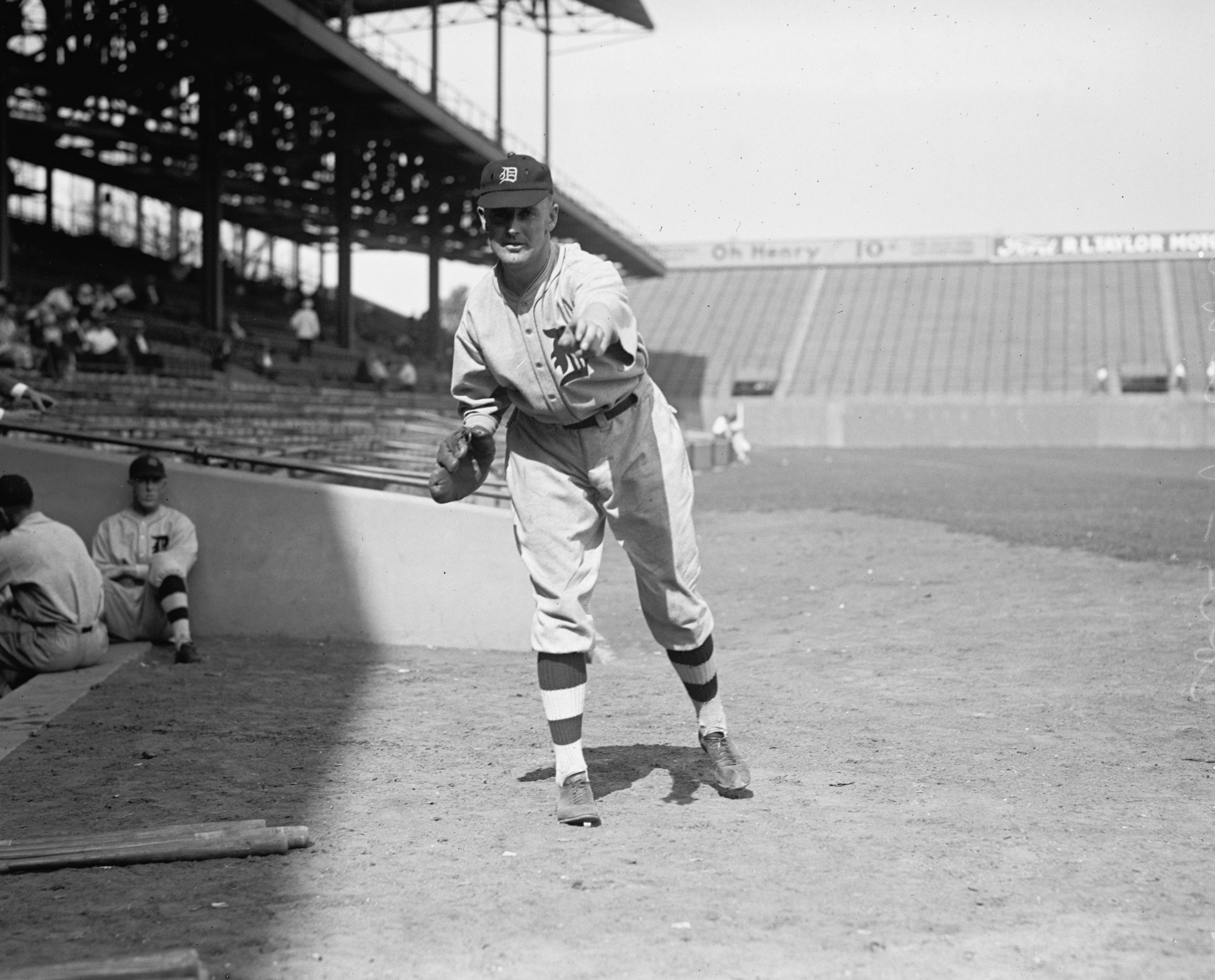
- Pitcher
- Born: July 1, 1896; San Francisco, California, U.S.
- Died: May 30, 1975 (aged 78); San Mateo, California, U.S.
- Batted: Left Threw: Left

MLB debut
- April 19, 1921, for the Detroit Tigers

Last MLB appearance
- September 18, 1927, for the Chicago White Sox

MLB statistics
- Win–loss record: 28–32
- Earned run average: 4.67
- Strikeouts: 119
- Stats at Baseball Reference

Teams
- Detroit Tigers (1921–1925); Cleveland Indians (1925); Chicago White Sox (1927)

Albert George Cole (July 1, 1896 – May 30, 1975) was an American baseball pitcher.

A native of San Francisco, he played professional baseball for 17 years from 1919 to 1935, including six seasons in Major League Baseball with the Detroit Tigers from 1921 to 1925, Cleveland Indians in 1925, and Chicago White Sox in 1927. In six major league seasons, he appeared in 177 games and compiled a 28–32 record and 4.67 earned run average (ERA). In 1924, he hit Bob Meusel with a pitch, triggering a riot that led to the Tigers' forfeiture of the game.

Cole also played 12 seasons in the Pacific Coast League for the Seattle Rainiers and Sacramento Senators (1919), San Francisco Seals (1920), Mission Reds (1926), Portland Beavers and Seattle Indians (1928), Mission Reds (1929–1933), and San Francisco Seals (1935). In 11 minor league seasons, he appeared in 346 games and compiled a 151–121 record and a 4.16 ERA.

== Early years ==
Cole was born in San Francisco in 1896.

== Professional baseball ==
=== Minor leagues ===
Cole began his professional career in 1919 with the Seattle Rainiers and Sacramento Senators. He also spent part of the 1919 season playing for the Mare Island Shipbuiders club. He spent most of 1920 with the Tacoma Tigers, and had a 24–7 win–loss record with them. He was then promoted to the San Francisco Seals and had a 5–1 record and a 1.86 earned run average (ERA) in 16 games during the 1920 season. Ty Cobb watched Cole pitch a game in October 1920 and praised Cole's "size and action," noting that he liked the way Cole mixed his pitches, "slowing up his delivery at times just enough to get the hitters off their stride, and breaking a curve ball over just when they were set for the fast one."

=== Detroit Tigers ===
In November 1920, the Seals traded Cole to the Detroit Tigers in exchange for first baseman Babe Ellison. Cole spent five years with the Tigers as both a starting pitcher and relief pitcher. He made his major league debut on April 19, 1921, and appeared in 20 games for the 1920 Tigers, including 11 games as a starter. He compiled a 7–4 record with a 4.27 ERA in his rookie season. In 1922, he appeared in 23 games, only five as a starter, and compiled a 1–6 record with a 4.88 ERA.

Cole's most productive season was 1923 when he had a 13–5 record with a 4.14 ERA in 52 games, 13 as a starter. His .722 win percentage in 1923 was the third best in the American League, and his 52 games was the third highest total in the league.

On Friday, June 13, 1924, during a game against the New York Yankees at Navin Field, Cole was a principal participant in an incident that resulted in a riot that led to Detroit's forfeiture of the game. The hostility began when Babe Ruth "stiff armed" Cole on a play at first base in the top of the seventh inning. In the top of the ninth inning, Cole "dusted" off Ruth and then struck Bob Meusel in the back with a pitched ball. Meusel, believing that Cole had intentionally thrown at him, walked deliberately to the pitcher's mound to confront Cole, who began to retreat. Ruth charged out from the dugout, and Ty Cobb ran in from center field to confront Ruth. The field then became "a swirling mass of players, pushing and tugging and milling." Meusel and Cole were ejected and escorted off the field, and as they walked through the Detroit dugout Meusel threw a blow at Cole. The players continued milling and fighting, and Detroit police officers entered the field of play to restore order. Several thousand Detroit fans then "flowed over the railings like some mighty dam that had broken." The fans overpowered the police, and rioting and fist fights followed. When the police were unable to clear the field, umpire Billy Evans declared the game forfeited to the Yankees. A writer in the Detroit Free Press noted: "No such disorder as that which prevented the completion of the game has been recorded in the history of modern baseball." The next day, American League president Ban Johnson announced indefinite suspensions of Cole and Meusel. After further review, Johnson shortened the suspensions to ten days and fined Ruth for what Johnson called his "frenzied effort to participate in the trouble."

=== Cleveland and Chicago ===
On July 3, 1925, the Tigers released Cole on waiver, and he was claimed by the Cleveland Indians. He appeared in 13 games for Indians and compiled a 1–1 record with a 6.14 ERA.

During the 1926 season, Cole played for the Mission Reds in San Francisco. He appeared in 41 games in 1926 and compiled a 29–12 record with a 2.63 ERA. In August 1926, the Reds sold Cole to the Chicago White Sox. He appeared in 27 games for the White Sox during the 1927 season and had a 1–4 record and a 4.73 ERA.

=== Minor leagues ===
After his major league career, Cole continued to pitch for several years in the minor leagues, primarily the Pacific Coast League. On November 5, 1927, the White Sox traded Cole was traded with Ike Boone and $100,000 to the Portland Beavers in exchange for Chalmer Cissell. Cole was dissatisfied playing in Portland and asked to be traded to one of the San Francisco teams. Instead, on June 20, 1928, the Portland club traded Cole with an outfielder to be named later to the Seattle Indians in exchange for pitcher Jack Knight.

In January 1929, fulfilling his desire to play for a San Francisco team, Cole signed a contract with the Mission Reds. He appeared in 42 games for the Reds in 1929 and compiled a 24–12 record with a 3.45 ERA. He remained with the Mission club for five years from 1929 to 1933. In 1934, he pitched for the Toronto Maple Leafs of the International League, then returned to the PCL with the San Francisco Seals in 1935, playing alongside Joe DiMaggio in his final season of professional baseball.

== Later years ==
Cole died in 1975 at age 78 at Mills Memorial Hospital in San Mateo, California. He was survived by his wife Helene and buried at Cypress Lawn Memorial Park in Colma, California.
