= Bob Jones (third baseman) =

American baseball player (1889–1964)

- Third baseman
- Born: December 2, 1889; Clayton, California, U.S.
- Died: August 30, 1964 (aged 74); San Diego, California, U.S.
- Batted: Left Threw: Right

MLB debut
- April 11, 1917, for the Detroit Tigers

Last MLB appearance
- September 24, 1925, for the Detroit Tigers

MLB statistics
- Batting average: .265
- Home runs: 7
- Runs batted in: 316
- Stats at Baseball Reference

Teams
- Detroit Tigers (1917–1925)

Robert Walter Jones (December 2, 1889 – August 30, 1964), nicknamed "Ducky", was an American baseball player who played professional baseball for 19 years, including nine seasons in Major League Baseball, principally as a third baseman, with the Detroit Tigers from 1917 to 1925.

== Early years ==
Jones was born in Clayton, California, in 1889.

== Professional baseball ==
=== Minor leagues ===
Jones began his professional baseball career in 1912 playing for the Walla Walla Bears in the Western Tri-State League. He moved on to Ogden Canners of the Union Association in 1913, compiling a .315 batting average in 117 games. He also began the 1914 season with Ogden, batting .366 in 84 games.

In August 1914, Jones was acquired by the San Francisco Seals. He played with the Seals starting in 1914 and continuing through the 1916 season.

=== Detroit Tigers ===
Jones made his major league debut at age 27 on April 11, 1917. A left-handed batter, he threw right-handed. He appeared in 853 major league games with a .265 batting average, 791 hits and 316 RBIs.

As the starting third baseman for the 1921 Detroit Tigers, Jones had his only .300 season, batting .303 for a Detroit team loaded with offensive talent (including Hall of Fame batting champions Ty Cobb and Harry Heilmann). Despite hitting .303, Jones was one of the "weaker" hitters on a team remembered for its record-setting .316 team batting average, still the highest single season average in American League history. Despite the impressive hitting, the 1921 Tigers finished in sixth place, 27 games behind the Yankees.

In nine seasons with the Tigers, Jones played 774 games at third base, with the rest at second base and as a pinch-hitter. He held the second-best fielding percentage (.962) among starting third basemen in the 1922 season. Jones also had a 3.60 range factor score in 1922, 0.36 points higher than the league average for third basemen. On May 7, 1923, Jones collected nine assists in a single game, which at the time tied him for the American League record for assists in a game by a third baseman.

=== Minor leagues ===
Although his major league career ended in 1925, Jones continued to play in the minor leagues through the 1930 season with the Mission Reds of the Pacific Coast League (PCL) in 1926 and 1927, the Los Angeles Angels of the PCL in 1928 and 1929, and the Reading Keystones of the International League in 1930. He compiled a .346 batting average in his final season at age 40.

== Later years ==
In 1964, Jones died at age 74 in San Diego, California.
