= 1921 Major League Baseball season =

1921 MLB season
- League: American League (AL); National League (NL)
- Sport: Baseball
- Duration: Regular season: April 13 – October 2, 1921; World Series: October 5–13, 1921
- Games: 154
- Teams: 16 (8 per league)

Pennant winners
- AL champions: New York Yankees
- AL runners-up: Cleveland Indians
- NL champions: New York Giants
- NL runners-up: Pittsburgh Pirates

World Series
- Champions: New York Giants
- Runners-up: New York Yankees

MLB seasons
- ← 1920 1922 →

Locations of teams for the 1915–1922 American League seasons
American League
Locations of teams for the 1920–1931 National League seasons
National League

The 1921 major league baseball season began on April 13, 1921. The regular season ended on October 2, with the New York Giants and New York Yankees as the regular season champions of the National League and American League, respectively. The postseason began with Game 1 of the 18th World Series on October 5 and ended with Game 8 on October 13. In the first Subway Series World Series, the Giants defeated the Yankees, five games to three, capturing their second championship in franchise history, since their previous in 1905. Going into the season, the defending World Series champions were the Cleveland Indians from the 1920 season.

1921 was the first of three straight seasons in which the Yankees would lead the majors in wins. Babe Ruth broke the single season home run record for the third consecutive season by hitting 59 home runs in 152 games. Ruth also broke Roger Connor's record for the most home runs all time when he hit his 139th home run on July 18 against Bert Cole. The record for career strikeouts, previously held by Cy Young was also broken in 1921 by Walter Johnson; Johnson led the league in strikeouts with 143 and ended the season with 2,835 strikeouts. Young struck out 2,803 during his career. The Cincinnati Reds set a Major League record for the fewest strikeouts in a season, with only 308. Future Hall of Famers Kiki Cuyler and Goose Goslin both debuted in September 1921.

== Schedule ==
The 1921 schedule consisted of 154 games for all teams in the American League and National League, each of which had eight teams. Each team was scheduled to play 22 games against the other seven teams of their respective league. This continued the format put in place since the 1904 season (except for 1919) and would be used until 1961 in the American League and 1962 in the National League.

Opening Day took place on April 13 with all but the Chicago White Sox and Detroit Tigers playing. The final day of the regular season was on October 2. The World Series took place between October 5 and October 13.

== Teams ==
League	Team	City	Ballpark	Capacity	Manager
American League	Boston Red Sox	Boston, Massachusetts	Fenway Park	27,000	Hugh Duffy
American League	Chicago White Sox	Chicago, Illinois	Comiskey Park	28,000	Kid Gleason
American League	Cleveland Indians	Cleveland, Ohio	Dunn Field	21,414	Tris Speaker
American League	Detroit Tigers	Detroit, Michigan	Navin Field	23,000	Ty Cobb
American League	New York Yankees	New York, New York	Polo Grounds	38,000	Miller Huggins
American League	Philadelphia Athletics	Philadelphia, Pennsylvania	Shibe Park	23,000	Connie Mack
American League	St. Louis Browns	St. Louis, Missouri	Sportsman's Park	24,040	Lee Fohl
American League	Washington Senators	Washington, D.C.	National Park	27,000	George McBride
National League	Boston Braves	Boston, Massachusetts	Braves Field	40,000	Fred Mitchell
National League	Brooklyn Robins	New York, New York	Ebbets Field	30,000	Wilbert Robinson
National League	Chicago Cubs	Chicago, Illinois	Cubs Park	15,000	Johnny Evers
National League	Chicago Cubs	Chicago, Illinois	Cubs Park	15,000	Bill Killefer
National League	Cincinnati Reds	Cincinnati, Ohio	Redland Field	20,696	Pat Moran
National League	New York Giants	New York, New York	Polo Grounds	38,000	John McGraw
National League	Philadelphia Phillies	Philadelphia, Pennsylvania	National League Park	18,000	Bill Donovan
National League	Philadelphia Phillies	Philadelphia, Pennsylvania	National League Park	18,000	Kaiser Wilhelm
National League	Pittsburgh Pirates	Pittsburgh, Pennsylvania	Forbes Field	25,000	George Gibson
National League	St. Louis Cardinals	St. Louis, Missouri	Sportsman's Park	24,040	Branch Rickey

== Standings ==
=== American League ===
American League
Team	W	L	Pct.	GB	Home	Road
New York Yankees	98	55	.641	—	53‍–‍25	45‍–‍30
Cleveland Indians	94	60	.610	4½	51‍–‍26	43‍–‍34
St. Louis Browns	81	73	.526	17½	43‍–‍34	38‍–‍39
Washington Senators	80	73	.523	18	46‍–‍30	34‍–‍43
Boston Red Sox	75	79	.487	23½	41‍–‍36	34‍–‍43
Detroit Tigers	71	82	.464	27	37‍–‍40	34‍–‍42
Chicago White Sox	62	92	.403	36½	37‍–‍40	25‍–‍52
Philadelphia Athletics	53	100	.346	45	28‍–‍47	25‍–‍53

=== National League ===
National League
Team	W	L	Pct.	GB	Home	Road
New York Giants	94	59	.614	—	53‍–‍26	41‍–‍33
Pittsburgh Pirates	90	63	.588	4	45‍–‍31	45‍–‍32
St. Louis Cardinals	87	66	.569	7	48‍–‍29	39‍–‍37
Boston Braves	79	74	.516	15	42‍–‍32	37‍–‍42
Brooklyn Robins	77	75	.507	16½	41‍–‍37	36‍–‍38
Cincinnati Reds	70	83	.458	24	40‍–‍36	30‍–‍47
Chicago Cubs	64	89	.418	30	32‍–‍44	32‍–‍45
Philadelphia Phillies	51	103	.331	43½	29‍–‍47	22‍–‍56

=== Tie games ===
3 tie games (2 in AL, 1 in NL), which are not factored into winning percentage or games behind (and were often replayed again) occurred throughout the season.

==== American League ====
The Philadelphia Athletics had two tie games. The Detroit Tigers and Washington Senators had one tie game each.

- April 29, Washington Senators vs. Philadelphia Athletics, tied at 3 after 10 innings due to rain.
- July 26, Detroit Tigers vs. Philadelphia Athletics, tied at 3 after the top of the 11th inning due to rain.

==== National League ====
- October 1, Pittsburgh Pirates vs. St. Louis Cardinals, tied at 4 after nine innings on account of darkness.

== Postseason ==
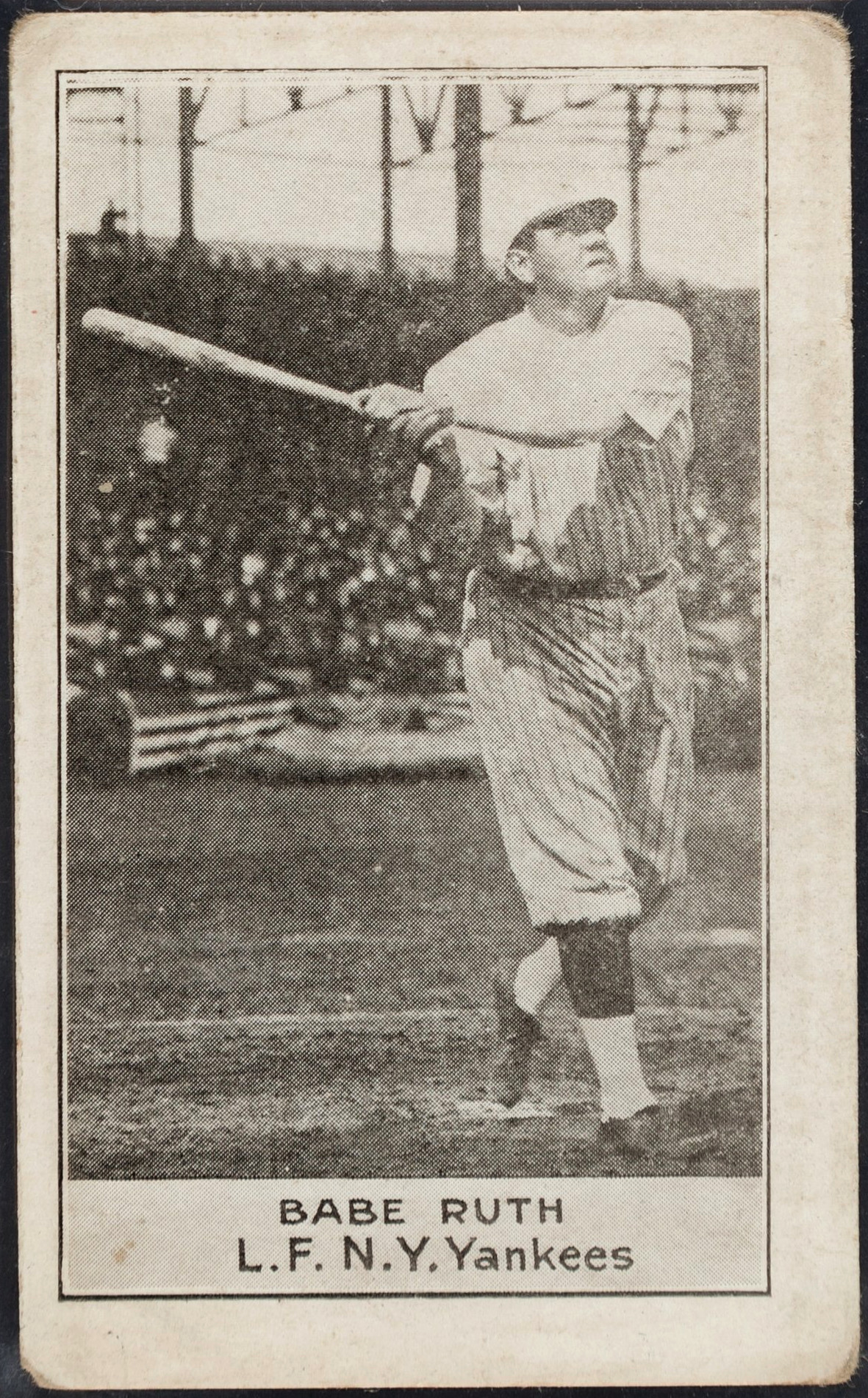

The postseason began on October 5 and ended on October 13 with the New York Giants defeating the New York Yankees in the 1921 World Series in eight games.

=== Bracket ===
World Series
AL	New York Yankees	3
NL	New York Giants	5

== Managerial changes ==
=== Off-season ===
Team	Former Manager	New Manager
Boston Braves	George Stallings	Fred Mitchell
Boston Red Sox	Ed Barrow	Hugh Duffy
Chicago Cubs	Fred Mitchell	Johnny Evers
Detroit Tigers	Hughie Jennings	Ty Cobb
Philadelphia Phillies	Gavvy Cravath	Bill Donovan
St. Louis Browns	Jimmy Burke	Lee Fohl
Washington Senators	Clark Griffith	George McBride

=== In-season ===
Team	Former Manager	New Manager
Chicago Cubs	Johnny Evers	Bill Killefer
Philadelphia Phillies	Bill Donovan	Kaiser Wilhelm

== League leaders ==
=== American League ===
Hitting leaders
Stat	Player	Total
AVG	Harry Heilmann (DET)	.394
OPS	Babe Ruth (NYY)	1.359
HR	Babe Ruth (NYY)	59
RBI	Babe Ruth (NYY)	168
R	Babe Ruth^{1} (NYY)	177
H	Harry Heilmann (DET)	237
SB	George Sisler (SLB)	35

^{1} Modern (1901–present) single-season runs record

Pitching leaders
Stat	Player	Total
W	Carl Mays (NYY); Urban Shocker (SLB)	27
L	Eddie Rommel (PHA)	23
ERA	Red Faber (CWS)	2.48
K	Walter Johnson (WSH)	143
IP	Carl Mays (NYY)	336.2
SV	Carl Mays (NYY)	7
WHIP	Red Faber (CWS)	1.149

=== National League ===
Hitting leaders
Stat	Player	Total
AVG	Rogers Hornsby (STL)	.397
OPS	Rogers Hornsby (STL)	1.097
HR	George Kelly (NYG)	23
RBI	Rogers Hornsby (STL)	126
R	Rogers Hornsby (STL)	131
H	Rogers Hornsby (STL)	235
SB	Frankie Frisch (NYG)	49

Pitching leaders
Stat	Player	Total
W	Wilbur Cooper (PIT); Burleigh Grimes (BRO)	22
L	George Smith (PHI)	20
ERA	Bill Doak (STL)	2.59
K	Burleigh Grimes (BRO)	136
IP	Wilbur Cooper (PIT)	327.0
SV	Lou North (STL)	7
WHIP	Babe Adams (PIT)	1.081

== Milestones ==
=== Batters ===
==== Cycles ====
- Bob Meusel (NYY):
  - Meusel hit for his first cycle and second in franchise history, on May 7 against the Washington Senators.
- Dave Bancroft (NYG):
  - Bancroft hit for his first cycle and sixth in franchise history, in game two of a doubleheader on June 1 against the Philadelphia Phillies.
- George Sisler (SLB):
  - Sisler hit for his second cycle and second in franchise history, on August 13 against the Detroit Tigers.
- Dave Robertson (PIT/CHC):
  - Robertson hit for his first cycle and sixth in franchise history as a part of the Pittsburgh Pirates, on August 30 against the Brooklyn Robins.

==== Other batting accomplishments ====
- Babe Ruth (NYY):
  - Broke the Major League career home run record when he hit his 139th home run against Bert Cole of the Detroit Tigers in the eighth inning on July 18, surpassing the record of 138 home runs set by Roger Connor in 1897.
- Ty Cobb (DET):
  - Became the fourth member of the 3,000-hit club with a single in the third inning against the Boston Red Sox in game two of a doubleheader on August 19.
  - Recorded his 800th career stolen base in the first inning against the New York Yankees on August 28. He became the second player to reach this mark.

== Home field attendance ==
Team name	Wins	%±	Home attendance	%±	Per game
New York Yankees	95	18.8%	1,289,422	108.3%	16,746
New York Giants	86	−1.1%	929,609	31.1%	11,620
Cleveland Indians	98	16.7%	912,832	69.6%	11,703
Pittsburgh Pirates	79	11.3%	429,037	55.0%	5,500
Detroit Tigers	61	−23.8%	579,650	−10.0%	7,431
Brooklyn Robins	93	34.8%	808,722	124.2%	10,368
Chicago White Sox	96	9.1%	833,492	32.9%	10,825
Washington Senators	68	21.4%	359,260	53.5%	4,727
Chicago Cubs	75	0.0%	480,783	13.3%	6,244
St. Louis Cardinals	75	38.9%	326,836	95.6%	4,300
St. Louis Browns	76	13.4%	419,311	20.0%	5,376
Philadelphia Athletics	48	33.3%	287,888	27.8%	3,739
Boston Braves	62	8.8%	162,483	−2.9%	2,196
Cincinnati Reds	82	−14.6%	568,107	6.7%	7,378
Boston Red Sox	72	9.1%	402,445	−3.6%	5,295
Philadelphia Phillies	62	31.9%	330,998	37.7%	4,299

== Media ==
=== Radio ===
==== Local ====
On August 5, the Pittsburgh Pirates 8–5 victory over the Philadelphia Phillies at Forbes Field was the first Major League game to be broadcast on radio. Harold Arlin calls the game for Pittsburgh station KDKA.

== See also ==
- 1921 in baseball (Events, Births, Deaths)
