= Range factor =

Baseball statistic

Range Factor (commonly abbreviated RF) is a baseball statistic developed by Bill James. It is calculated by dividing putouts and assists by the number of innings or games played at a given defense position. The statistic is premised on the notion that the total number of outs in which a player participates is more relevant in evaluating that player's defensive play than the percentage of cleanly handled chances as calculated by the conventional statistic fielding percentage.

However, some positions (especially first baseman) may have substantially more putouts because of a superior infield around them that commits fewer errors and turns many double plays, allowing them to receive credit for more putouts. Also, catchers who have many strikeout pitchers on their team will have a high range factor, because the catcher gets the putout on a strikeout if the batter does not reach base.

== All-time single-season leaders ==
Note: All-time single-season leaders are listed according to Range Factor by games played (A + PO) / G. Yearly leaders listed above from 2001–present are listed according to Range Factor per nine innings 9 *(A + PO)/ Inn. Because the latter statistic is unavailable for older players, the former figure is used below to ensure use of comparable data for the all time single season leaders. The figures set forth below are verified from Baseball-Reference.com.

=== First base (minimum 80 games) ===
1. Jiggs Donahue: 12.65 (Chicago White Sox, 1907)
2. Jiggs Donahue: 12.35 (Chicago White Sox, 1908)
3. Phil Todt: 12.21 (Boston Red Sox, 1926)
4. George Burns: 12.10 (Detroit Tigers, 1914)
5. Stuffy McInnis: 12.10 (Boston Red Sox, 1918)

=== Second base (minimum 80 games) ===
1. Fred Pfeffer: 7.29 (Chicago White Stockings, 1884)
2. Jack Burdock: 7.18 (Boston Red Caps, 1879)
3. Joe Quest: 7.16 (Chicago White Stockings, 1879)
4. Pop Smith: 7.13 (Pittsburgh Alleghenys, 1885)
5. Bid McPhee: 7.09 (Cincinnati Red Stockings, 1886)

=== Shortstop (minimum 80 games) ===
1. Hughie Jennings: 6.73 (Baltimore Orioles, 1895)
2. George Davis: 6.69 (New York Giants, 1899)
3. Dave Bancroft: 6.62 (Philadelphia Phillies, 1918)
4. Hughie Jennings: 6.56 (Baltimore Orioles, 1896)
5. Hughie Jennings: 6.55 (Baltimore Orioles, 1897)

=== Third base (minimum 80 games) ===
1. Billy Shindle: 4.34 (Baltimore Orioles, 1892)
2. Jumbo Davis: 4.33 (Kansas City Cowboys, 1888)
3. Billy Alvord: 4.31 (Cleveland Spiders/Washington Statesmen, 1891)
4. Bill Bradley: 4.29 (Chicago Orphans, 1900)
5. Jimmy Collins: 4.26 (Boston Beaneaters, 1896)

=== Pitcher (minimum 250 innings pitched) ===
1. Harry Howell: 5.24 (St. Louis Browns, 1905)
2. Harry Howell: 4.97 (St. Louis Browns, 1904)
3. Ed Walsh: 4.68 (Chicago White Sox, 1907)
4. Will White: 4.56 (Cincinnati Red Stockings, 1882)
5. George Mullin: 4.24 (Detroit Tigers, 1904)
6. Nick Altrock: 4.21 (Chicago White Sox, 1905)
7. Tony Mullane: 4.20 (Louisville Eclipse, 1882)
8. Willie Sudhoff: 4.19 (St. Louis Browns, 1904)
9. Red Donahue: 4.14 (St. Louis Browns, 1902)
10. Nick Altrock: 4.13 (Chicago White Sox, 1904)

=== Catcher (minimum 81 games) ===
1. Buster Posey: 9.23 (San Francisco Giants, 2021)
2. Damian Miller: 8.89 (Chicago Cubs, 2003)
3. Damian Miller: 8.64 (Arizona Diamondbacks, 2001)
4. Barney Gilligan: 8.63 (Providence Grays, 1884)
5. Michael Barrett: 8.32 (Chicago Cubs, 2004)
6. Duffy Dyer: 8.25 (New York Mets, 1972)
7. Javy López: 8.17 (Atlanta Braves, 1998)
8. Joe Azcue: 8.06 (Cleveland Indians, 1967)
9. Mike Piazza: 8.05 (Los Angeles Dodgers, 1997)
10. Johnny Edwards: 8.04 (Houston Astros, 1969)

=== Right field (minimum 80 games) ===
1. Babe Herman: 2.81 (Cincinnati Reds, 1932)
2. Harry Heilmann: 2.78 (Cincinnati Reds, 1930)
3. Paul Waner: 2.68 (Pittsburgh Pirates, 1931)
4. Al Kaline: 2.63 (Detroit Tigers, 1961)
5. Dave Parker: 2.63 (Pittsburgh Pirates, 1977)
6. Chuck Klein: 2.60 (Philadelphia Phillies, 1930)
7. Roberto Clemente: 2.58 (Pittsburgh Pirates, 1957)
8. Dwight Evans: 2.57 (Boston Red Sox, 1975)
9. Tony Armas: 2.53 (Oakland Athletics, 1982)

=== Center field (minimum 80 games) ===
1. Taylor Douthit: 3.62 (St. Louis Cardinals, 1928)
2. Richie Ashburn: 3.59 (Philadelphia Phillies, 1951)
3. Thurman Tucker: 3.55 (Chicago White Sox, 1944)
4. Kirby Puckett: 3.55 (Minnesota Twins, 1984)
5. Chet Lemon: 3.52 (Chicago White Sox, 1977)
6. Irv Noren: 3.45 (Washington Senators, 1951)
7. Mike Cameron: 3.42 (Seattle Mariners, 2003)
8. Richie Ashburn: 3.42 (Philadelphia Phillies, 1949)
9. Carden Gillenwater: 3.39 (Boston Braves, 1945)
10. Sam West: 3.38 (St. Louis Browns, 1935)
11. Richie Ashburn: 3.34 (Philadelphia Phillies, 1956)

=== Left field (minimum 80 games) ===
1. Rickey Henderson 3.12 (Oakland Athletics, 1981)
2. Ed Delahanty: 2.98 (Philadelphia Phillies, 1893)
3. Joe Vosmik: 2.90 (Cleveland Indians, 1932)
4. Ed Delahanty: 2.83 (Philadelphia Phillies, 1896)
5. Fred Clarke: 2.76 (Louisville Colonels, 1895)
6. Charlie Jamieson: 2.74 (Cleveland Indians, 1928)
7. Goose Goslin: 2.73 (Washington Senators, 1925)
8. Bobby Veach: 2.72 (Detroit Tigers, 1921)
9. Elmer Valo: 2.69 (Philadelphia Athletics, 1949)
10. Al Simmons: 2.67 (Chicago White Sox, 1933)

== Sources ==
- Baseball-Reference.com (Career Leaders & Records for Range Factor/9Inn as SS)
- Baseball Almanac
- ESPN.com
