= 1922 Detroit Tigers season =

Major League Baseball season

1922 Detroit Tigers
- League: American League
- Ballpark: Navin Field
- City: Detroit, Michigan
- Record: 79–75 (.513)
- League place: 3rd
- Owners: Frank Navin
- Managers: Ty Cobb

The 1922 Detroit Tigers season was a season in American baseball. The team finished third in the American League with a record of 79–75, 15 games behind the New York Yankees.

== Regular season ==
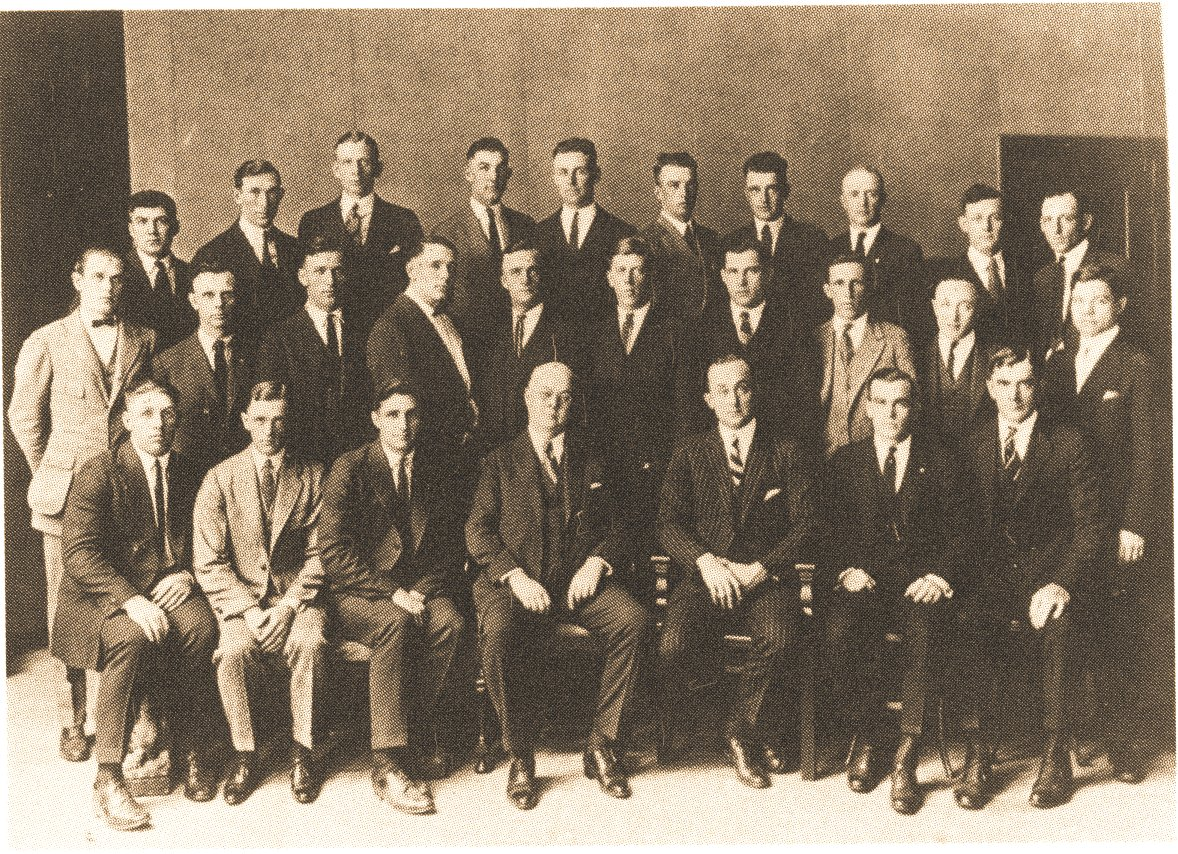

=== Season standings ===
American League
Team	W	L	Pct.	GB	Home	Road
New York Yankees	94	60	.610	—	50‍–‍27	44‍–‍33
St. Louis Browns	93	61	.604	1	54‍–‍23	39‍–‍38
Detroit Tigers	79	75	.513	15	43‍–‍34	36‍–‍41
Cleveland Indians	78	76	.506	16	44‍–‍35	34‍–‍41
Chicago White Sox	77	77	.500	17	43‍–‍34	34‍–‍43
Washington Senators	69	85	.448	25	40‍–‍39	29‍–‍46
Philadelphia Athletics	65	89	.422	29	38‍–‍39	27‍–‍50
Boston Red Sox	61	93	.396	33	31‍–‍42	30‍–‍51

=== Record vs. opponents ===
1922 American League record Sources:
Team	BOS	CWS	CLE	DET	NYY	PHA	SLB	WSH
Boston	—	10–12	6–16	5–17	13–9	10–12	7–15	10–12
Chicago	12–10	—	12–10–1	17–5	9–13	12–10	8–14	7–15
Cleveland	16–6	10–12–1	—	15–7	7–15	11–11	6–16	13–9
Detroit	17–5	5–17	7–15	—	11–11	16–6–1	9–13	14–8
New York	9–13	13–9	15–7	11–11	—	17–5	14–8	15–7
Philadelphia	12–10	10–12	11–11	6–16–1	5–17	—	9–13	12–10
St. Louis	15–7	14–8	16–6	13–9	8–14	13–9	—	14–8
Washington	12–10	15–7	9–13	8–14	7–15	10–12	8–14	—

=== Roster ===
1922 Detroit Tigers
Roster
Pitchers: Bert Cole; Hooks Dauss; Howard Ehmke; Carl Holling; Ken Holloway; Syl Johnson; Roy Moore; Red Oldham; Ole Olsen; Herman Pillette; Lil Stoner	Catchers: Johnny Bassler; Clyde Manion; Larry Woodall; Infielders: Lu Blue; Danny Clark; George Cutshaw; Chick Gagnon; Fred Haney; Bob Jones; Topper Rigney	Outfielders: Ty Cobb; Ira Flagstead; Bob Fothergill; Harry Heilmann; John Mohardt; Bobby Veach	Manager: Ty Cobb; Coaches: Dan Howley

== Player stats ==
=== Batting ===
==== Starters by position ====
Note: Pos = Position; G = Games played; AB = At bats; H = Hits; Avg. = Batting average; HR = Home runs; RBI = Runs batted in

Pos	Player	G	AB	H	Avg.	HR	RBI
C	Johnny Bassler	121	372	120	.323	0	41
1B	Lu Blue	145	584	175	.300	6	45
2B	George Cutshaw	132	499	133	.267	2	61
SS	Topper Rigney	155	536	161	.300	2	63
3B	Bob Jones	124	455	117	.257	3	44
OF	Harry Heilmann	118	455	162	.356	21	92
OF	Ty Cobb	137	526	211	.401	4	99
OF	Bobby Veach	155	618	202	.327	9	126

==== Other batters ====
Note: G = Games played; AB = At bats; H = Hits; Avg. = Batting average; HR = Home runs; RBI = Runs batted in

Player	G	AB	H	Avg.	HR	RBI
Fred Haney	81	213	75	.352	0	25
Danny Clark	83	185	54	.292	3	26
Bob Fothergill	42	152	49	.322	0	29
Larry Woodall	50	125	43	.344	0	18
Ira Flagstead	44	91	28	.308	3	8
Clyde Manion	42	69	19	.275	0	12
Chick Gagnon	10	4	1	.250	0	0
John Mohardt	5	1	1	1.000	0	0

=== Pitching ===
==== Starting pitchers ====
Note: G = Games pitched; IP = Innings pitched; W = Wins; L = Losses; ERA = Earned run average; SO = Strikeouts

Player	G	IP	W	L	ERA	SO
Howard Ehmke	45	279.2	17	17	4.22	108
Herman Pillette	40	274.2	19	12	2.85	71
Hooks Dauss	39	218.2	13	13	4.20	78
Red Oldham	43	212.0	10	13	4.67	72

==== Other pitchers ====
Note: G = Games pitched; IP = Innings pitched; W = Wins; L = Losses; ERA = Earned run average; SO = Strikeouts

Player	G	IP	W	L	ERA	SO
Ole Olsen	37	137.0	7	6	4.53	52
Syl Johnson	29	97.0	7	3	3.71	29
Bert Cole	23	79.1	1	6	4.88	21
Lil Stoner	17	62.2	4	4	7.04	18
Carl Holling	5	9.1	1	1	15.43	2

==== Relief pitchers ====
Note: G = Games pitched; W = Wins; L = Losses; SV = Saves; ERA = Earned run average; SO = Strikeouts

Player	G	W	L	SV	ERA	SO
Roy Moore	9	0	0	2	5.95	9
Ken Holloway	1	0	0	0	0.00	1

== Farm system ==
Level	Team	League	Manager
AA	Syracuse Stars	International League	Frank Shaughnessy
A	Fort Worth Panthers	Texas League	Jake Atz

LEAGUE CHAMPIONS: Fort Worth
