= 1928 Philadelphia Athletics season =

1928 Philadelphia Athletics
- League: American League
- Ballpark: Shibe Park
- City: Philadelphia
- Record: 98–55 (.641)
- League place: 2nd
- Owners: Connie Mack, Tom Shibe and John Shibe
- Managers: Connie Mack

The 1928 Philadelphia Athletics season involved the A's finishing second in the American League with a record of 98 wins and 55 losses. The team featured seven eventual Hall-of-Fame players: Ty Cobb, Mickey Cochrane, Eddie Collins, Jimmie Foxx, Lefty Grove, Al Simmons, and Tris Speaker.

== Offseason ==
- February 5, 1928: Tris Speaker was signed as a free agent by the Athletics.

== Regular season ==
By this time, the nucleus of the 1929–31 dynasty was in place for the A's. The team featured three starters who were later elected into the Hall of Fame: catcher Mickey Cochrane and outfielders Al Simmons and Ty Cobb. Cochrane was voted league MVP. Simmons led the team with a .351 batting average and 107 RBI. Cobb, in his last major league season, hit .323 in 95 games. Jimmie Foxx, Tris Speaker, and Eddie Collins also saw playing time for the 1928 team.

The pitching staff, led by 24-game winner Lefty Grove, allowed the fewest runs in the AL.

The A's were in a hard fought pennant race with the New York Yankees this season. After trailing the Yankees by 13.5 games on July 1, the A's caught fire with a 25-8 record in July and a 19-9 record in August. In September, the A's won the first 6 out of 8 games and on the 8th pulled into first place by 1/2 game by sweeping the Red Sox at Fenway Park in a doubleheader. However, on the very next day, the A's were swept by the Yankees in a doubleheader at Yankee Stadium to fall back into second place. The A's kept close on the Yankees heels, but couldn't overtake New York.

=== Season standings ===
American League
Team	W	L	Pct.	GB	Home	Road
New York Yankees	101	53	.656	—	52‍–‍25	49‍–‍28
Philadelphia Athletics	98	55	.641	2½	52‍–‍25	46‍–‍30
St. Louis Browns	82	72	.532	19	43‍–‍34	39‍–‍38
Washington Senators	75	79	.487	26	37‍–‍43	38‍–‍36
Chicago White Sox	72	82	.468	29	37‍–‍40	35‍–‍42
Detroit Tigers	68	86	.442	33	36‍–‍41	32‍–‍45
Cleveland Indians	62	92	.403	39	28‍–‍49	34‍–‍43
Boston Red Sox	57	96	.373	43½	26‍–‍47	31‍–‍49

=== Record vs. opponents ===
1928 American League record Sources:
Team	BOS	CWS	CLE	DET	NYY	PHA	SLB	WSH
Boston	—	10–12	9–13	7–15	6–16	3–18	9–13	13–9–1
Chicago	12–10	—	12–10–1	13–9	9–13	6–16	10–12	10–12
Cleveland	13–9	10–12–1	—	10–12	6–16	6–16	7–15	10–12
Detroit	15–7	9–13	12–10	—	7–15	8–14	9–13	8–14
New York	16–6	13–9	16–6	15–7	—	16–6	12–10	13–9
Philadelphia	18–3	16–6	16–6	14–8	6–16	—	16–6	12–10
St. Louis	13–9	12–10	15–7	13–9	10–12	6–16	—	13–9
Washington	9–13–1	12–10	12–10	14–8	9–13	10–12	9–13	—

=== Roster ===
1928 Philadelphia Athletics
Roster
Pitchers: Joe Bush; Art Daney; George Earnshaw; Howard Ehmke; Lefty Grove; Jing Johnson; Ike Powers; Jack Quinn; Eddie Rommel; Bill Shores; Rube Walberg; Carroll Yerkes	Catchers: Mickey Cochrane; Cy Perkins; Infielders: Max Bishop; Joe Boley; Eddie Collins; Jimmy Dykes; Jimmie Foxx; Sammy Hale; Joe Hassler; Joe Hauser; Ossie Orwoll	Outfielders: Ty Cobb; Walter French; Mule Haas; Bing Miller; Al Simmons; Tris Speaker	Manager: Connie Mack

== Player stats ==
=== Batting ===
==== Starters by position ====
Note: Pos = Position; G = Games played; AB = At bats; H = Hits; Avg. = Batting average; HR = Home runs; RBI = Runs batted in

Pos	Player	G	AB	H	Avg.	HR	RBI
C	Mickey Cochrane	131	468	137	.293	10	57
1B	Joe Hauser	95	300	78	.260	16	59
2B	Max Bishop	126	472	149	.316	6	50
3B	Sammy Hale	88	314	97	.309	4	58
SS	Joe Boley	132	425	112	.264	0	49
OF	Bing Miller	139	510	168	.329	8	85
OF	Al Simmons	119	464	163	.351	15	107
OF	Ty Cobb	95	353	114	.323	1	40

==== Other batters ====
Note: G = Games played; AB = At bats; H = Hits; Avg. = Batting average; HR = Home runs; RBI = Runs batted in

Player	G	AB	H	Avg.	HR	RBI
Jimmie Foxx	118	400	131	.328	13	79
Mule Haas	91	332	93	.280	6	39
Jimmy Dykes	85	242	67	.277	5	30
Tris Speaker	64	191	51	.267	3	30
Ossie Orwoll	64	170	52	.306	0	22
Walter French	48	74	19	.257	0	7
Joe Hassler	28	34	9	.265	0	3
Eddie Collins	36	33	10	.303	0	7
Cy Perkins	19	29	5	.172	0	1

=== Pitching ===
= Indicates league leader

==== Starting pitchers ====
Note: G = Games pitched; IP = Innings pitched; W = Wins; L = Losses; ERA = Earned run average; SO = Strikeouts

Player	G	IP	W	L	ERA	SO
Lefty Grove	39	261.2	24	8	2.58	183
Rube Walberg	38	235.2	17	12	3.55	112
Jack Quinn	31	211.1	18	7	2.90	43
George Earnshaw	26	158.1	7	7	3.81	117
Howard Ehmke	23	139.1	9	8	3.62	34

==== Other pitchers ====
Note: G = Games pitched; IP = Innings pitched; W = Wins; L = Losses; ERA = Earned run average; SO = Strikeouts

Player	G	IP	W	L	ERA	SO
Eddie Rommel	43	173.2	13	5	3.06	37
Ossie Orwoll	27	106.0	6	5	4.58	53
Bill Shores	3	14.0	1	1	3.21	5
Carroll Yerkes	2	8.2	0	1	2.08	1

Note: Eddie Rommel was the team leader in saves with 4.

==== Relief pitchers ====
Note: G = Games pitched; W = Wins; L = Losses; SV = Saves; ERA = Earned run average; SO = Strikeouts

Player	G	W	L	SV	ERA	SO
Joe Bush	11	2	1	1	5.09	15
Ike Powers	9	1	0	2	4.50	4
Jing Johnson	3	0	0	0	5.06	3
Art Daney	1	0	0	0	0.00	0

== Awards and honors ==
- Mickey Cochrane, AL Most Valuable Player

=== League top five finishers ===
Max Bishop

- #4 in AL in on-base percentage (.435)

Lefty Grove

- AL leader in wins (24)
- AL leader in strikeouts (183)
- #3 in AL in ERA (2.58)

Joe Hauser

- #4 in AL in home runs (16)

Al Simmons

- #4 in AL in batting average (.351)
