= 1928 St. Louis Browns season =

Major League Baseball season

1928 St. Louis Browns
- League: American League
- Ballpark: Sportsman's Park
- City: St. Louis, Missouri
- Record: 82–72 (.532)
- League place: 3rd
- Owners: Phil Ball
- Managers: Dan Howley
- Radio: KMOX; WIL (AM); KWK

The 1928 St. Louis Browns season involved the Browns finishing 3rd in the American League with a record of 82 wins and 72 losses.

== Offseason ==
- December 2, 1927: Harry Rice, Chick Galloway and Elam Vangilder were traded by the Browns to the Detroit Tigers for Heinie Manush and Lu Blue.

== Regular season ==
=== Season standings ===
American League
Team	W	L	Pct.	GB	Home	Road
New York Yankees	101	53	.656	—	52‍–‍25	49‍–‍28
Philadelphia Athletics	98	55	.641	2½	52‍–‍25	46‍–‍30
St. Louis Browns	82	72	.532	19	43‍–‍34	39‍–‍38
Washington Senators	75	79	.487	26	37‍–‍43	38‍–‍36
Chicago White Sox	72	82	.468	29	37‍–‍40	35‍–‍42
Detroit Tigers	68	86	.442	33	36‍–‍41	32‍–‍45
Cleveland Indians	62	92	.403	39	28‍–‍49	34‍–‍43
Boston Red Sox	57	96	.373	43½	26‍–‍47	31‍–‍49

=== Record vs. opponents ===
1928 American League record Sources:
Team	BOS	CWS	CLE	DET	NYY	PHA	SLB	WSH
Boston	—	10–12	9–13	7–15	6–16	3–18	9–13	13–9–1
Chicago	12–10	—	12–10–1	13–9	9–13	6–16	10–12	10–12
Cleveland	13–9	10–12–1	—	10–12	6–16	6–16	7–15	10–12
Detroit	15–7	9–13	12–10	—	7–15	8–14	9–13	8–14
New York	16–6	13–9	16–6	15–7	—	16–6	12–10	13–9
Philadelphia	18–3	16–6	16–6	14–8	6–16	—	16–6	12–10
St. Louis	13–9	12–10	15–7	13–9	10–12	6–16	—	13–9
Washington	9–13–1	12–10	12–10	14–8	9–13	10–12	9–13	—

=== Notable transactions ===
- April 25, 1928: Wally Gerber was traded by the Browns to the Boston Red Sox for Hal Wiltse.

=== Roster ===
1928 St. Louis Browns
Roster
Pitchers: Boom-Boom Beck; George Blaeholder; Dick Coffman; Alvin Crowder; Sam Gray; Ernie Nevers; Jack Ogden; Lefty Stewart; Ed Strelecki; Hal Wiltse; Jim Wright	Catchers: Ike Danning; Clyde Manion; Steve O'Neill; Wally Schang; Infielders: Larry Bettencourt; Lu Blue; Otis Brannan; Wally Gerber; Red Kress; Ski Melillo; Billy Mullen; Frank O'Rourke; Ollie Sax; Guy Sturdy	Outfielders: Fred Bennett; Heinie Manush; Beauty McGowan; Earl McNeely; Fred Schulte; Frank Wilson	Manager: Dan Howley

== Player stats ==
=== Batting ===
==== Starters by position ====
Note: Pos = Position; G = Games played; AB = At bats; H = Hits; Avg. = Batting average; HR = Home runs; RBI = Runs batted in

Pos	Player	G	AB	H	Avg.	HR	RBI
C	Wally Schang	91	245	70	.286	3	39
1B	Lu Blue	154	549	154	.281	14	80
2B	Otis Brannan	135	483	118	.244	10	66
SS	Red Kress	150	560	153	.273	3	81
3B	Frank O'Rourke	99	391	103	.263	1	62
OF	Fred Schulte	146	556	159	.286	7	85
OF	Heinie Manush	154	638	241	.378	13	108
OF	Earl McNeely	127	496	117	.236	0	44

==== Other batters ====
Note: G = Games played; AB = At bats; H = Hits; Avg. = Batting average; HR = Home runs; RBI = Runs batted in

Player	G	AB	H	Avg.	HR	RBI
Clyde Manion	76	243	55	.226	2	31
Beauty McGowan	47	168	61	.363	2	18
Larry Bettencourt	67	159	45	.283	4	24
Ski Melillo	51	132	25	.189	0	9
Guy Sturdy	54	45	10	.222	1	8
Steve O'Neill	10	24	7	.292	0	6
Billy Mullen	15	18	7	.389	0	2
Wally Gerber	6	18	5	.278	0	0
Ollie Sax	16	17	3	.176	0	0
Fred Bennett	7	8	2	.250	0	0
Ike Danning	2	6	3	.500	0	1
Frank Wilson	6	5	0	.000	0	0

=== Pitching ===
==== Starting pitchers ====
Note: G = Games pitched; IP = Innings pitched; W = Wins; L = Losses; ERA = Earned run average; SO = Strikeouts

Player	G	IP	W	L	ERA	SO
Sam Gray	35	262.2	20	12	3.19	102
General Crowder	41	244.0	21	5	3.69	99
Jack Ogden	38	242.2	15	16	4.15	67
George Blaeholder	38	214.1	10	15	4.37	87

==== Other pitchers ====
Note: G = Games pitched; IP = Innings pitched; W = Wins; L = Losses; ERA = Earned run average; SO = Strikeouts

Player	G	IP	W	L	ERA	SO
Lefty Stewart	29	142.2	7	9	4.67	25
Dick Coffman	29	85.2	4	5	6.09	25
Hal Wiltse	26	72.0	2	5	5.25	23
Boom-Boom Beck	16	49.0	2	3	4.41	17

==== Relief pitchers ====
Note: G = Games pitched; W = Wins; L = Losses; SV = Saves; ERA = Earned run average; SO = Strikeouts

Player	G	W	L	SV	ERA	SO
Ed Strelecki	22	0	2	1	4.29	8
Ernie Nevers	6	1	0	0	3.00	1
Jim Wright	2	0	0	0	13.50	2
