= List of Detroit Tigers Opening Day starting pitchers =

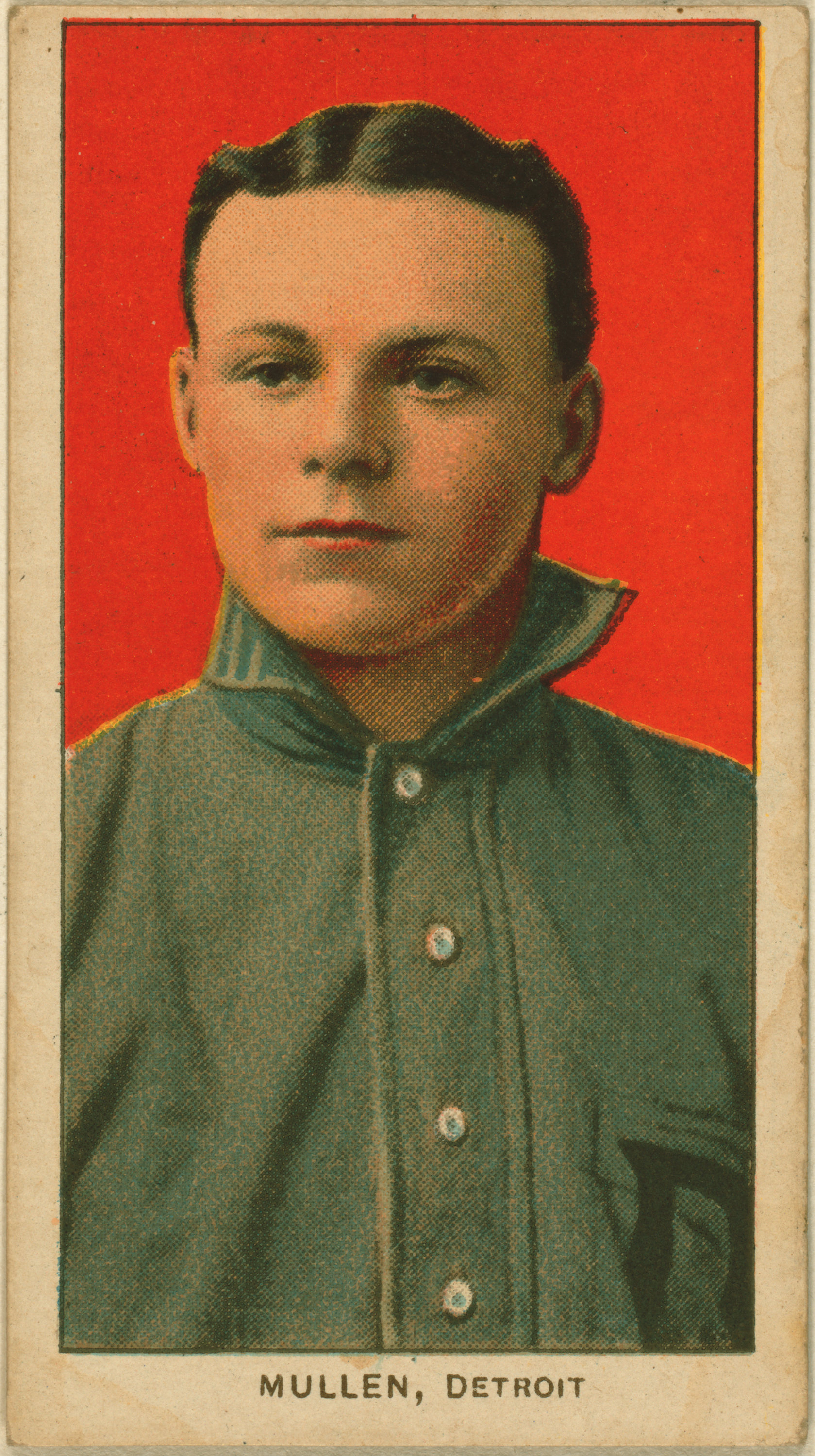
George Mullin made ten Opening Day starts for the Detroit Tigers.

The Detroit Tigers are a Major League Baseball (MLB) franchise based in Detroit, Michigan. They play in the American League Central division. The first game of the new baseball season is played on Opening Day, and being named the starter that day is an honor, which is often given to the player who is expected to lead the pitching staff that season, though there are various strategic reasons why a team's best pitcher might not start on Opening Day. Since joining the league in 1901, the Tigers have used 57 different Opening Day starting pitchers. The Tigers have a record of 56 wins and 61 losses in their Opening Day games. They also played one tie game, in 1927.

The Tigers have played in three different home ball parks, Bennett Park from 1901 through 1911, Tiger Stadium (also known as Navin Field and Briggs Stadium) from 1912 to 1999 and Comerica Park since 2000. They had a record of five wins and two losses in Opening Day games at Bennett Park, 19 wins and 22 losses at Tiger Stadium and three wins and four losses at Comerica Park, for a total home record in Opening Day games of 26 wins and 28 losses. Their record in Opening Day away games is 27 wins, 31 losses and one tie.

Jack Morris has the most Opening Day starts for the Tigers, with 11 consecutive starts from 1980 to 1990. Morris had a record of seven wins and four losses in his Opening Day starts. George Mullin had ten Opening Day starts for the Tigers between 1903 and 1913. The Tigers won five of those games and lost the other five. Mickey Lolich had seven Opening Day starts between 1965 and 1974. He had a record of five wins and two losses in those starts. Justin Verlander has also made seven Opening Day starts for the Tigers, between 2008 and 2014. His record in those starts is one win and one loss with five no-decisions. Other Tiger pitchers with at least three Opening Day starts include Hal Newhouser with six, Earl Whitehill and Jim Bunning with four; and Tommy Bridges, Frank Lary, Mike Moore, and Tarik Skubal with three.

The first game the Tigers played as a Major League team was on April 25, 1901, against the Milwaukee Brewers. Roscoe Miller was the Tigers Opening Day starting pitcher for that game, which the Tigers won 14–13. The Tigers have played in the World Series eleven times, in 1907, 1908, 1909, 1934, 1935, 1940, 1945, 1968, 1984, 2006, and 2012, with wins in four of those: 1935, 1945, 1968 and 1984. The Tigers Opening Day starting pitchers in those seasons were Mullin (1907 and 1909), Ed Siever (1908), Firpo Marberry (1934), Rowe (1935), Newsom (1940), Newhouser (1945), Earl Wilson (1968), Morris (1984), Kenny Rogers (2006), and Justin Verlander (2012). The Tigers won five of those Opening Day games and lost the other five.

Josh Billings was the Tigers Opening Day starting pitcher in 1928, despite being only 20 years old and having only won five Major League games prior to the season. Bunning, who made four Opening Day starts for the Tigers was later elected to the United States Senate. McLain, who made two Opening Day starts for the Tigers, was later convicted of embezzlement. Bunning and Newhouser have each been inducted into the Baseball Hall of Fame.

== Key ==
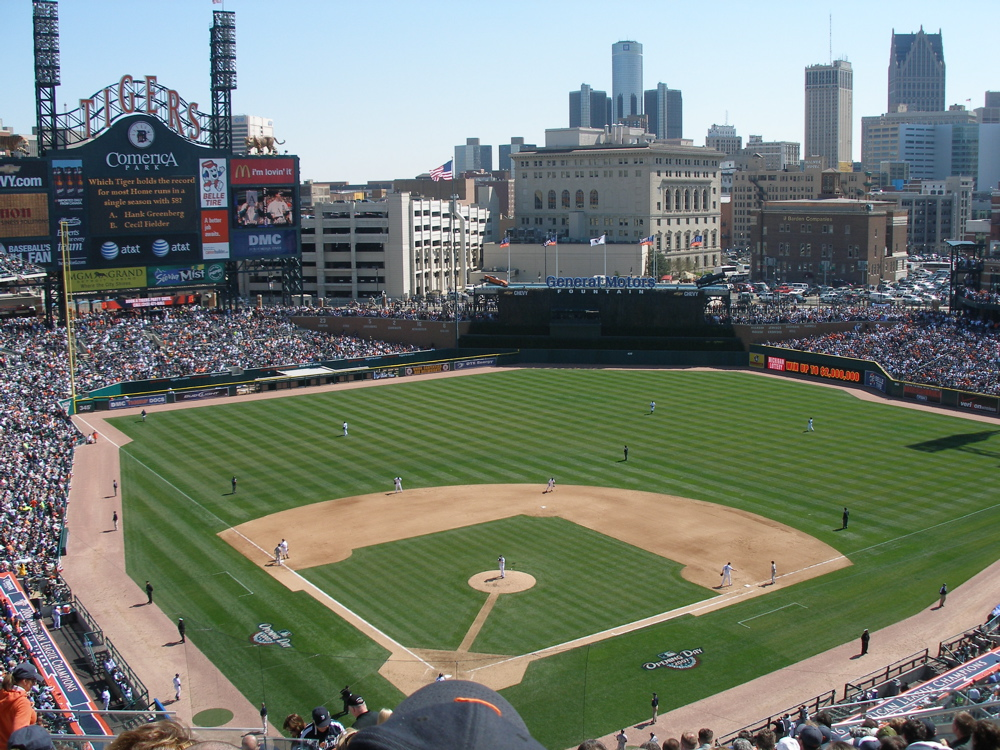
Comerica Park, home of the Detroit Tigers since 2000

W	Win
L	Loss
T	Tie game
ND (W)	No decision by starting pitcher; Tigers won game
ND (L)	No decision by starting pitcher; Tigers lost game
(W)	Tigers won game; no information on starting pitcher's decision
(L)	Tigers lost game; no information on starting pitcher's decision
Final score	Game score with Tigers runs listed first
Location	Stadium in italics with ‡ for home game
(No.)	Number of appearances as Opening Day starter with the Tigers
*	Advanced to the post-season
**	American League champions
†	World Series champions

== Pitchers ==
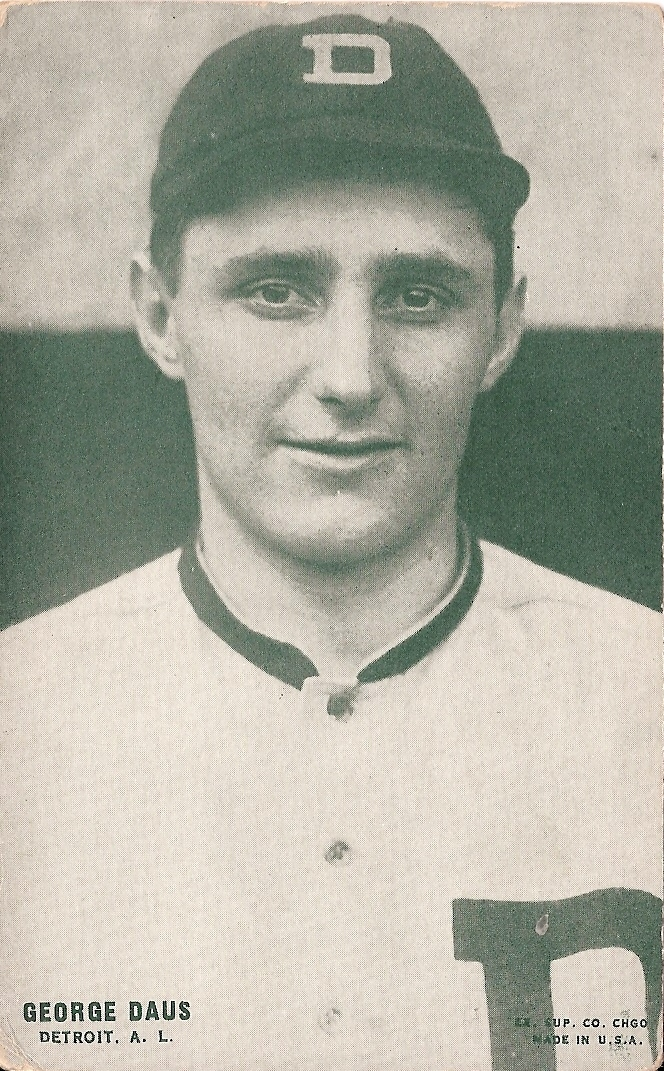
Hooks Dauss made two Opening Day starts for the Tigers.

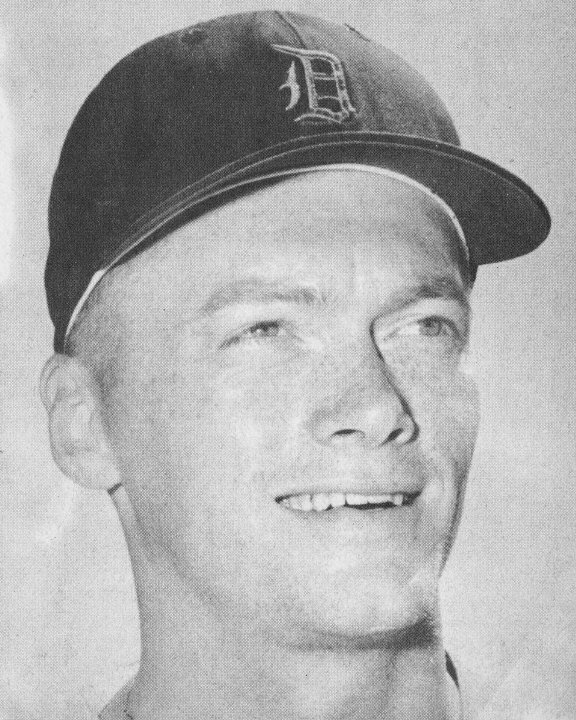
United States Senator Jim Bunning made four Opening Day starts for the Tigers.

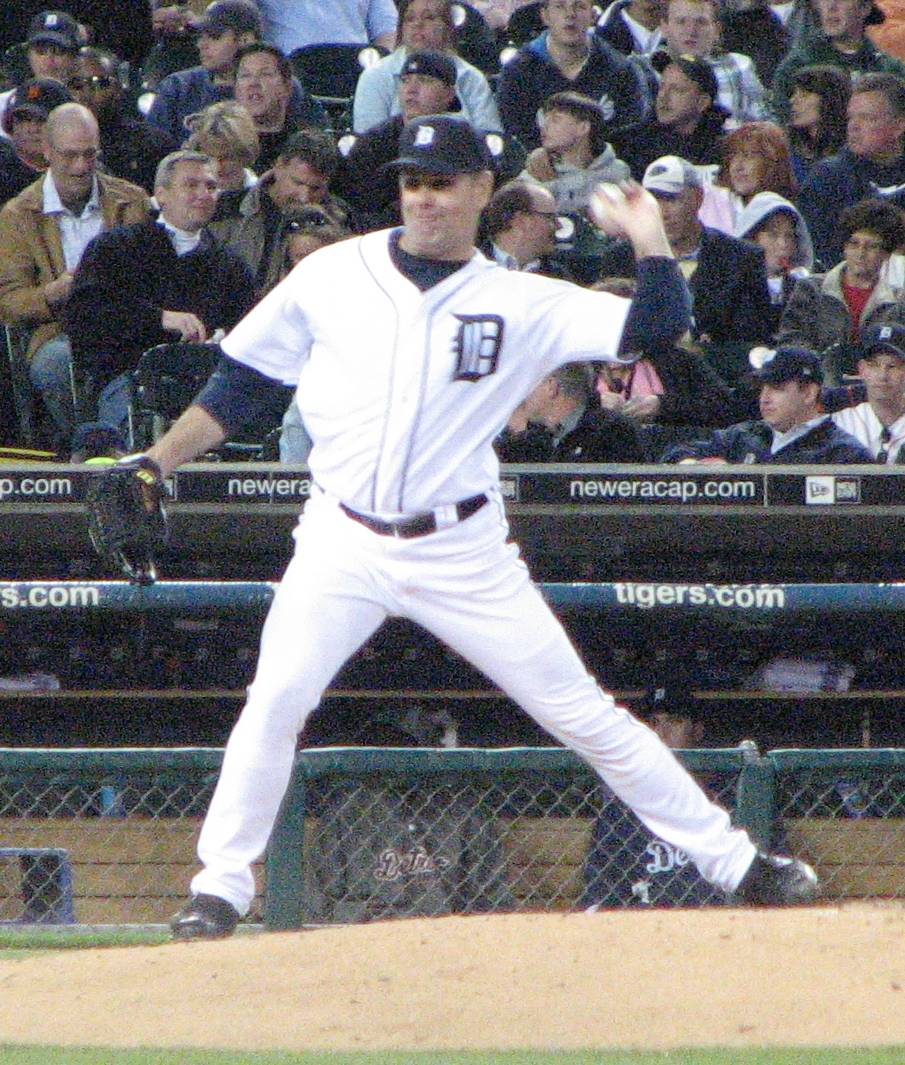
Kenny Rogers was the Tigers' Opening Day starting pitcher in their American League championship year of 2006.

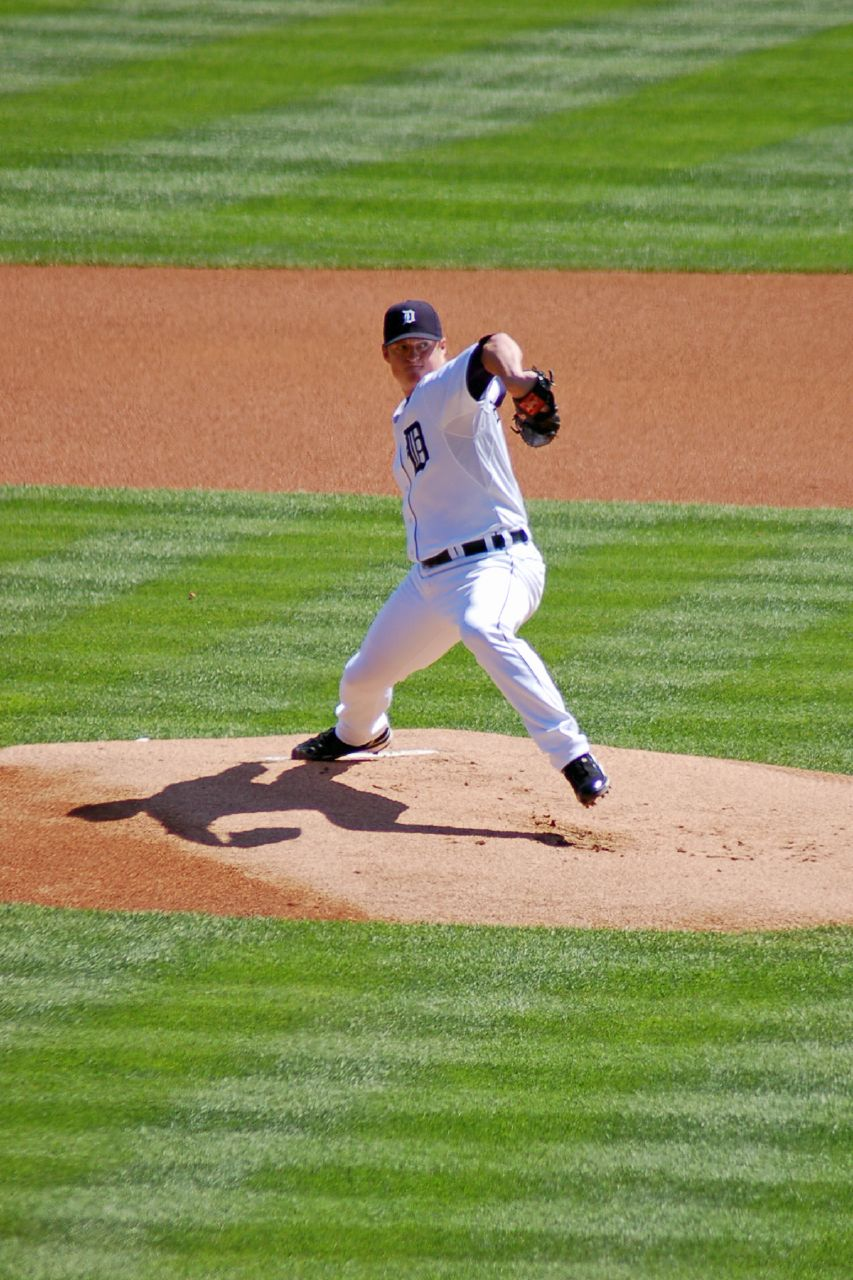
Jeremy Bonderman was the Tigers' Opening Day starter in 2005 and 2007.

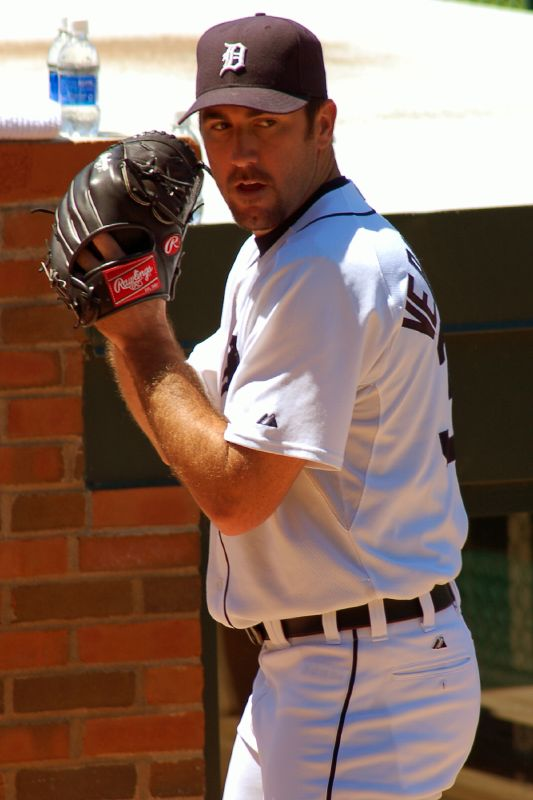
Justin Verlander was the Tigers' Opening Day starting pitcher every year from 2008 to 2014.

Season	Pitcher	Decision	Final score	Opponent	Location	Ref.
1901	Roscoe Miller	(W)	14–13	Milwaukee Brewers	Bennett Park‡	
1902	Roscoe Miller (2)	(L)	2–12	Chicago White Sox	South Side Park	
1903	George Mullin	(W)	4–2	Cleveland Indians	Bennett Park‡	
1904	George Mullin (2)	(W)	7–2	St. Louis Browns	Sportsman's Park	
1905	George Mullin (3)	(L)	2–6	Cleveland Indians	League Park	
1906	George Mullin (4)	(L)	3–5	Chicago White Sox	Bennett Park‡	
1907**	George Mullin (5)	(W)	2–0	Cleveland Indians	Bennett Park‡	
1908**	Ed Siever	(L)	8–15	Chicago White Sox	South Side Park	
1909**	George Mullin (6)	(W)	2–0	Chicago White Sox	Bennett Park‡	
1910	George Mullin (7)	(L)	7–9	Cleveland Indians	Bennett Park‡	
1911	George Mullin (8)	(W)	4–2	Chicago White Sox	Bennett Park‡	
1912	George Mullin (9)	(L)	2–3	Cleveland Indians	League Park	
1913	George Mullin (10)	(L)	1–3	St. Louis Browns	Sportsman's Park	
1914	Jean Dubuc	(W)	3–2	St. Louis Browns	Navin Field‡	
1915	Harry Coveleski	(L)	1–5	Cleveland Indians	Navin Field‡	
1916	Harry Coveleski (2)	(W)	4–0	Chicago White Sox	Comiskey Park	
1917	Bill James	(L)	4–6	Cleveland Indians	Navin Field‡	
1918	Bernie Boland	(L)	2–6	Cleveland Indians	League Park	
1919	Howard Ehmke	(W)	4–2	Cleveland Indians	League Park	
1920	Hooks Dauss	(L)	2–3	Chicago White Sox	Comiskey Park	
1921	Dutch Leonard	ND (W)	6–5	Chicago White Sox	Navin Field‡	
1922	Red Oldham	(L)	4–7	Cleveland Indians	League Park	
1923	Rip Collins	ND (W)	9–6	St. Louis Browns	Sportsman's Park	
1924	Hooks Dauss (2)	W	4–3	Cleveland Indians	Navin Field‡	
1925	Dutch Leonard (2)	W	4–3	Chicago White Sox	Navin Field‡	
1926	Earl Whitehill	L	1–2	Cleveland Indians	Navin Field‡	
1927	Earl Whitehill (2)	T	2–2	St. Louis Browns	Sportsman's Park	
1928	Josh Billings	(L)	1–4	St. Louis Browns	Navin Field‡	
1929	Earl Whitehill (3)	(L)	4–5	Cleveland Indians	League Park	
1930	George Uhle	W	6–3	St. Louis Browns	Navin Field‡	
1931	Earl Whitehill (4)	(L)	3–7	St. Louis Browns	Sportsman's Park	
1932	Vic Sorrell	(L)	5–6	Cleveland Indians	Navin Field‡	
1933	Tommy Bridges	(L)	1–4	Cleveland Indians	Navin Field‡	
1934**	Firpo Marberry	W	8–3	Chicago White Sox	Comiskey Park	
1935†	Schoolboy Rowe	(L)	6–7	Chicago White Sox	Navin Field‡	
1936	Schoolboy Rowe (2)	W	3–0	Cleveland Indians	Cleveland Stadium	
1937	Elden Auker	W	4–3	Cleveland Indians	Navin Field‡	
1938	Roxie Lawson	(L)	3–4	Chicago White Sox	Comiskey Park	
1939	Tommy Bridges (2)	W	6–1	Chicago White Sox	Briggs Stadium‡	
1940**	Bobo Newsom	(L)	1–4	St. Louis Browns	Briggs Stadium‡	
1941	Bobo Newsom (2)	(L)	1–8	St. Louis Browns	Sportsman's Park	
1942	Al Benton	(L)	2–5	Cleveland Indians	Briggs Stadium‡	
1943	Tommy Bridges (3)	(L)	0–1	Cleveland Indians	Cleveland Stadium	
1944	Dizzy Trout	(L)	1–2	St. Louis Browns	Briggs Stadium‡	
1945†	Hal Newhouser	(L)	1–7	St. Louis Browns	Sportsman's Park	
1946	Hal Newhouser (2)	W	2–1	St. Louis Browns	Briggs Stadium‡	
1947	Hal Newhouser (3)	W	7–0	St. Louis Browns	Sportsman's Park	
1948	Hal Newhouser (4)	W	5–2	Chicago White Sox	Comiskey Park	
1949	Hal Newhouser (5)	W	5–1	Chicago White Sox	Briggs Stadium‡	
1950	Fred Hutchinson	ND (W)	7–6	Cleveland Indians	Cleveland Stadium	
1951	Hal Newhouser (6)	(L)	1–2	Cleveland Indians	Briggs Stadium‡	
1952	Dizzy Trout (2)	(L)	0–3	St. Louis Browns	Briggs Stadium‡	
1953	Ned Garver	(L)	0–10	St. Louis Browns	Sportsman's Park	
1954	Steve Gromek	W	3–0	Baltimore Orioles	Briggs Stadium‡	
1955	Ned Garver (2)	L	2–6	Kansas City Athletics	Municipal Stadium	
1956	Frank Lary	L	1–2	Kansas City Athletics	Briggs Stadium‡	
1957	Frank Lary (2)	L	1–2	Kansas City Athletics	Municipal Stadium	
1958	Jim Bunning	W	4–3	Chicago White Sox	Comiskey Park	
1959	Jim Bunning (2)	ND (L)	7–9	Chicago White Sox	Briggs Stadium‡	
1960	Frank Lary (3)	ND (W)	4–2	Cleveland Indians	Cleveland Stadium	
1961	Jim Bunning (3)	L	5–9	Cleveland Indians	Tiger Stadium‡	
1962	Don Mossi	L	1–4	Washington Senators	Robert F. Kennedy Stadium	
1963	Jim Bunning (4)	L	5–7	Chicago White Sox	Tiger Stadium‡	
1964	Phil Regan	W	7–3	Kansas City Athletics	Tiger Stadium‡	
1965	Mickey Lolich	W	6–2	Kansas City Athletics	Municipal Stadium	
1966	Mickey Lolich (2)	W	2–1	New York Yankees	Yankee Stadium	
1967	Denny McLain	L	2–5	California Angels	Anaheim Stadium	
1968†	Earl Wilson	L	3–7	Boston Red Sox	Tiger Stadium‡	
1969	Denny McLain (2)	W	6–2	Cleveland Indians	Tiger Stadium‡	
1970	Mickey Lolich (3)	W	5–0	Washington Senators	Robert F. Kennedy Stadium	
1971	Mickey Lolich (4)	W	8–2	Cleveland Indians	Tiger Stadium‡	
1972*	Mickey Lolich (5)	W	3–2	Boston Red Sox	Tiger Stadium‡	
1973	Mickey Lolich (6)	L	1–2	Cleveland Indians	Cleveland Stadium	
1974	Mickey Lolich (7)	L	2–3	Baltimore Orioles	Memorial Stadium	
1975	Joe Coleman	L	0–10	Baltimore Orioles	Tiger Stadium‡	
1976	Joe Coleman (2)	W	3–1	Cleveland Indians	Cleveland Stadium	
1977	Dave Roberts	L	7–2	Kansas City Royals	Tiger Stadium‡	
1978	Mark Fidrych	W	6–2	Toronto Blue Jays	Tiger Stadium‡	
1979	Dave Rozema	L	2–8	Texas Rangers	Tiger Stadium‡	
1980	Jack Morris	W	5–1	Kansas City Royals	Kauffman Stadium	
1981	Jack Morris (2)	W	6–2	Toronto Blue Jays	Tiger Stadium‡	
1982	Jack Morris (3)	L	2–4	Kansas City Royals	Kauffman Stadium	
1983	Jack Morris (4)	W	11–3	Minnesota Twins	Hubert H. Humphrey Metrodome	
1984†	Jack Morris (5)	W	8–1	Minnesota Twins	Hubert H. Humphrey Metrodome	
1985	Jack Morris (6)	W	5–4	Cleveland Indians	Tiger Stadium‡	
1986	Jack Morris (7)	W	6–5	Boston Red Sox	Tiger Stadium‡	
1987*	Jack Morris (8)	L	1–2	New York Yankees	Tiger Stadium‡	
1988	Jack Morris (9)	W	5–3	Boston Red Sox	Fenway Park	
1989	Jack Morris (10)	L	0–4	Texas Rangers	Arlington Stadium	
1990	Jack Morris (11)	L	2–5	Boston Red Sox	Fenway Park	
1991	Frank Tanana	ND (W)	6–4	New York Yankees	Tiger Stadium‡	
1992	Bill Gullickson	L	2–4	Toronto Blue Jays	Tiger Stadium‡	
1993	Mike Moore	L	4–9	Oakland Athletics	Oakland Coliseum	
1994	Mike Moore (2)	ND (L)	8–9	Boston Red Sox	Fenway Park	
1995	Mike Moore (3)	W	5–4	California Angels	Angel Stadium	
1996	Felipe Lira	L	6–8	Minnesota Twins	Hubert H. Humphrey Metrodome	
1997	Doug Brocail	ND (L)	5–7	Minnesota Twins	Hubert H. Humphrey Metrodome	
1998	Justin Thompson	W	11–6	Tampa Bay Devil Rays	Tropicana Field	
1999	Brian Moehler	W	11–5	Texas Rangers	Rangers Ballpark in Arlington	
2000	Hideo Nomo	W	7–4	Oakland Athletics	Oakland Coliseum	
2001	Jeff Weaver	L	2–3	Minnesota Twins	Comerica Park‡	
2002	Jeff Weaver (2)	ND (L)	5–9	Tampa Bay Devil Rays	Tropicana Field	
2003	Mike Maroth	L	1–3	Minnesota Twins	Comerica Park‡	
2004	Jason Johnson	W	7–0	Toronto Blue Jays	SkyDome	
2005	Jeremy Bonderman	W	11–2	Kansas City Royals	Comerica Park‡	
2006**	Kenny Rogers	W	3–1	Kansas City Royals	Kauffman Stadium	
2007	Jeremy Bonderman (2)	ND (L)	3–5	Toronto Blue Jays	Comerica Park‡	
2008	Justin Verlander	ND (L)	4–5	Kansas City Royals	Comerica Park‡	
2009	Justin Verlander (2)	L	5–12	Toronto Blue Jays	SkyDome	
2010	Justin Verlander (3)	ND (W)	8–4	Kansas City Royals	Kauffman Stadium	
2011*	Justin Verlander (4)	ND (L)	3–6	New York Yankees	Yankee Stadium	
2012**	Justin Verlander (5)	ND (W)	3–2	Boston Red Sox	Comerica Park‡	
2013*	Justin Verlander (6)	W	3–2	Minnesota Twins	Target Field	
2014*	Justin Verlander (7)	ND (W)	3–2	Kansas City Royals	Comerica Park‡	
2015	David Price	W	4–0	Minnesota Twins	Comerica Park‡	
2016	Justin Verlander (8)	ND (W)	8–7	Miami Marlins	Marlins Park	
2017	Justin Verlander (9)	(W)	6–3	Chicago White Sox	Guaranteed Rate Field	
2018	Jordan Zimmermann	ND (L)	10–13	Pittsburgh Pirates	Comerica Park‡	
2019	Jordan Zimmermann (2)	ND (W)	2–0	Toronto Blue Jays	Rogers Centre	
2020	Matthew Boyd	L	1–7	Cincinnati Reds	Great American Ball Park	
2021	Matthew Boyd (2)	W	3–2	Cleveland Indians	Comerica Park‡	
2022	Eduardo Rodríguez	ND (W)	5–4	Chicago White Sox	Comerica Park‡	
2023	Eduardo Rodríguez (2)	L	0–4	Tampa Bay Rays	Tropicana Field	
2024*	Tarik Skubal	W	1–0	Chicago White Sox	Guaranteed Rate Field	
2025*	Tarik Skubal (2)	L	4–5	Los Angeles Dodgers	Dodger Stadium	
2026	Tarik Skubal (3)	W	8–2	San Diego Padres	Petco Park	
