= 1928 Detroit Tigers season =

Major League Baseball season

1928 Detroit Tigers
- League: American League
- Ballpark: Navin Field
- City: Detroit, Michigan
- Record: 68–86 (.442)
- League place: 6th
- Owners: Frank Navin
- Managers: George Moriarty
- Radio: WWJ (AM) (Ty Tyson)

The 1928 Detroit Tigers season was a season in American baseball. The team finished sixth in the American League with a record of 68–86, 33 games behind the New York Yankees.

== Offseason ==
- December 2, 1927: Heinie Manush and Lu Blue were traded by the Tigers to the St. Louis Browns for Harry Rice, Chick Galloway and Elam Vangilder.

== Regular season ==
=== Season standings ===
American League
Team	W	L	Pct.	GB	Home	Road
New York Yankees	101	53	.656	—	52‍–‍25	49‍–‍28
Philadelphia Athletics	98	55	.641	2½	52‍–‍25	46‍–‍30
St. Louis Browns	82	72	.532	19	43‍–‍34	39‍–‍38
Washington Senators	75	79	.487	26	37‍–‍43	38‍–‍36
Chicago White Sox	72	82	.468	29	37‍–‍40	35‍–‍42
Detroit Tigers	68	86	.442	33	36‍–‍41	32‍–‍45
Cleveland Indians	62	92	.403	39	28‍–‍49	34‍–‍43
Boston Red Sox	57	96	.373	43½	26‍–‍47	31‍–‍49

=== Record vs. opponents ===
1928 American League record Sources:
Team	BOS	CWS	CLE	DET	NYY	PHA	SLB	WSH
Boston	—	10–12	9–13	7–15	6–16	3–18	9–13	13–9–1
Chicago	12–10	—	12–10–1	13–9	9–13	6–16	10–12	10–12
Cleveland	13–9	10–12–1	—	10–12	6–16	6–16	7–15	10–12
Detroit	15–7	9–13	12–10	—	7–15	8–14	9–13	8–14
New York	16–6	13–9	16–6	15–7	—	16–6	12–10	13–9
Philadelphia	18–3	16–6	16–6	14–8	6–16	—	16–6	12–10
St. Louis	13–9	12–10	15–7	13–9	10–12	6–16	—	13–9
Washington	9–13–1	12–10	12–10	14–8	9–13	10–12	9–13	—

=== Roster ===
1928 Detroit Tigers
Roster
Pitchers: Josh Billings; Ownie Carroll; Sam Gibson; Ken Holloway; Phil Page; George Smith; Vic Sorrell; Lil Stoner; Charlie Sullivan; Elam Vangilder; Earl Whitehill	Catchers: Pinky Hargrave; Merv Shea; Larry Woodall; Infielders: Chick Galloway; Charlie Gehringer; Marty McManus; Johnny Neun; Bill Sweeney; Jackie Tavener; Jack Warner	Outfielders: Paul Easterling; Bob Fothergill; Harry Heilmann; Harry Rice; John Stone; Al Wingo	Manager: George Moriarty; Coaches: Lefty Leifield; Benny Meyer; Shag Shaughnessy

== Player stats ==
=== Batting ===
==== Starters by position ====
Note: Pos = Position; G = Games played; AB = At bats; H = Hits; Avg. = Batting average; HR = Home runs; RBI = Runs batted in

Pos	Player	G	AB	H	Avg.	HR	RBI
C	Pinky Hargrave	121	320	88	.275	10	63
1B	Bill Sweeney	89	309	78	.252	0	19
2B	Charlie Gehringer	154	603	193	.320	6	74
SS	Jackie Tavener	132	473	123	.260	5	52
3B	Marty McManus	139	500	144	.288	8	73
OF	Harry Heilmann	151	558	183	.328	14	107
OF	Bob Fothergill	111	347	110	.317	3	63
OF	Harry Rice	131	510	154	.302	6	81

==== Other batters ====
Note: G = Games played; AB = At bats; H = Hits; Avg. = Batting average; HR = Home runs; RBI = Runs batted in

Player	G	AB	H	Avg.	HR	RBI
Al Wingo	87	242	69	.285	2	30
Jack Warner	75	206	44	.214	0	13
Larry Woodall	65	186	39	.210	0	13
Chick Galloway	53	148	39	.264	1	17
Paul Easterling	43	114	37	.325	3	12
John Stone	26	113	40	.354	2	21
Johnny Neun	36	108	23	.213	0	5
Merv Shea	39	85	20	.235	0	9

=== Pitching ===
==== Starting pitchers ====
Note: G = Games pitched; IP = Innings pitched; W = Wins; L = Losses; ERA = Earned run average; SO = Strikeouts

Player	G	IP	W	L	ERA	SO
Ownie Carroll	34	231.0	16	12	3.27	51
Earl Whitehill	31	196.1	11	16	4.31	93
Vic Sorrell	29	171.0	8	11	4.79	67
Sam Gibson	20	119.2	5	8	5.42	29
Josh Billings	21	110.2	5	10	5.12	48

==== Other pitchers ====
Note: G = Games pitched; IP = Innings pitched; W = Wins; L = Losses; ERA = Earned run average; SO = Strikeouts

Player	G	IP	W	L	ERA	SO
Elam Vangilder	38	156.1	11	10	3.91	43
Lil Stoner	36	126.1	5	8	4.35	29
Ken Holloway	30	120.1	4	8	4.34	32
Phil Page	3	22.0	2	0	2.45	3
Charlie Sullivan	3	12.1	0	2	6.57	2

==== Relief pitchers ====
Note: G = Games pitched; W = Wins; L = Losses; SV = Saves; ERA = Earned run average; SO = Strikeouts

Player	G	W	L	SV	ERA	SO
George Smith	39	1	1	3	4.42	54

== Farm system ==
Level	Team	League	Manager
A	Fort Worth Panthers	Texas League	Jake Atz
B	Evansville Hubs	Illinois–Indiana–Iowa League	Bob Coleman
C	Wheeling Stogies	Middle Atlantic League	Bobby Prysock
