= 1928 Washington Senators season =

1928 Washington Senators
- League: American League
- Ballpark: Griffith Stadium
- City: Washington, D.C.
- Record: 75–79 (.487)
- League place: 4th
- Owners: Clark Griffith and William Richardson
- Managers: Bucky Harris

The 1928 Washington Senators won 75 games, lost 79, and finished in fourth place in the American League. They were managed by Bucky Harris and played home games at Griffith Stadium.

== Offseason ==
- February 1, 1928: Tris Speaker was released by the Senators.

== Regular season ==
=== Season standings ===
American League
Team	W	L	Pct.	GB	Home	Road
New York Yankees	101	53	.656	—	52‍–‍25	49‍–‍28
Philadelphia Athletics	98	55	.641	2½	52‍–‍25	46‍–‍30
St. Louis Browns	82	72	.532	19	43‍–‍34	39‍–‍38
Washington Senators	75	79	.487	26	37‍–‍43	38‍–‍36
Chicago White Sox	72	82	.468	29	37‍–‍40	35‍–‍42
Detroit Tigers	68	86	.442	33	36‍–‍41	32‍–‍45
Cleveland Indians	62	92	.403	39	28‍–‍49	34‍–‍43
Boston Red Sox	57	96	.373	43½	26‍–‍47	31‍–‍49

=== Record vs. opponents ===
1928 American League record Sources:
Team	BOS	CWS	CLE	DET	NYY	PHA	SLB	WSH
Boston	—	10–12	9–13	7–15	6–16	3–18	9–13	13–9–1
Chicago	12–10	—	12–10–1	13–9	9–13	6–16	10–12	10–12
Cleveland	13–9	10–12–1	—	10–12	6–16	6–16	7–15	10–12
Detroit	15–7	9–13	12–10	—	7–15	8–14	9–13	8–14
New York	16–6	13–9	16–6	15–7	—	16–6	12–10	13–9
Philadelphia	18–3	16–6	16–6	14–8	6–16	—	16–6	12–10
St. Louis	13–9	12–10	15–7	13–9	10–12	6–16	—	13–9
Washington	9–13–1	12–10	12–10	14–8	9–13	10–12	9–13	—

=== Roster ===
1928 Washington Senators roster
Roster
Pitchers: Garland Braxton; Lloyd Brown; Bobby Burke; Milt Gaston; Bump Hadley; Sam Jones; Hod Lisenbee; Firpo Marberry; Clay Van Alstyne; Jim Weaver; Tom Zachary	Catchers: Al Bool; Eddie Kenna; Muddy Ruel; Bennie Tate; Infielders: Pelham Ballenger; Ossie Bluege; Harley Boss; Joe Cronin; Ed Crowley; Grant Gillis; Bucky Harris; Jackie Hayes; Joe Judge; Bobby Reeves; George Sisler	Outfielders: Red Barnes; Babe Ganzel; Goose Goslin; Sam Rice; Dick Spalding; Sam West; Other batters: Hugh McMullen	Manager: Bucky Harris

== Player stats ==
=== Batting ===
==== Starters by position ====
Note: Pos = Position; G = Games played; AB = At bats; H = Hits; Avg. = Batting average; HR = Home runs; RBI = Runs batted in

Pos	Player	G	AB	H	Avg.	HR	RBI
C	Muddy Ruel	108	350	90	.257	0	55
1B	Joe Judge	153	542	166	.306	3	93
2B	Bucky Harris	99	358	73	.204	0	28
SS	Bobby Reeves	102	353	107	.303	3	42
3B	Ossie Bluege	146	518	154	.297	2	75
OF	Goose Goslin	135	456	173	.379	17	102
OF	Red Barnes	114	417	127	.305	6	51
OF	Sam Rice	148	616	202	.328	2	55

==== Other batters ====
Note: G = Games played; AB = At bats; H = Hits; Avg. = Batting average; HR = Home runs; RBI = Runs batted in

Player	G	AB	H	Avg.	HR	RBI
Sam West	125	378	114	.302	3	40
Joe Cronin	63	227	55	.242	0	25
Jackie Hayes	60	210	54	.257	0	22
Bennie Tate	57	122	30	.246	0	15
Eddie Kenna	41	118	35	.297	1	20
Grant Gillis	24	87	22	.253	0	10
George Sisler	20	49	12	.245	0	2
Babe Ganzel	10	26	2	.077	0	4
Dick Spalding	16	23	8	.348	0	0
Harley Boss	12	12	3	.250	0	2
Pelham Ballenger	3	9	1	.111	0	0
Al Bool	2	7	1	.143	0	1
Ed Crowley	2	1	0	.000	0	0
Hugh McMullen	1	1	0	.000	0	0

=== Pitching ===
==== Starting pitchers ====
Note: G = Games pitched; IP = Innings pitched; W = Wins; L = Losses; ERA = Earned run average; SO = Strikeouts

Player	G	IP	W	L	ERA	SO
Bump Hadley	33	231.2	12	13	3.54	80
Sam Jones	30	224.2	17	7	2.84	63
Milt Gaston	28	148.2	6	12	5.51	45
Tom Zachary	20	102.2	6	9	5.44	19

==== Other pitchers ====
Note: G = Games pitched; IP = Innings pitched; W = Wins; L = Losses; ERA = Earned run average; SO = Strikeouts

Player	G	IP	W	L	ERA	SO
Garland Braxton	38	218.1	13	11	2.51	94
Firpo Marberry	48	161.1	13	13	3.85	76
Lloyd Brown	27	107.0	4	4	4.04	38
Bobby Burke	26	85.1	2	4	3.90	27
Hod Lisenbee	16	77.0	2	6	6.08	13

==== Relief pitchers ====
Note: G = Games pitched; W = Wins; L = Losses; SV = Saves; ERA = Earned run average; SO = Strikeouts

Player	G	W	L	SV	ERA	SO
Clay Van Alstyne	4	0	0	0	5.48	5
Jim Weaver	3	0	0	0	1.50	2
