= Danny Clark (baseball) =

American baseball player (1894–1937)

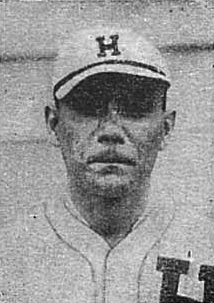
- Third baseman/Second baseman
- Born: January 18, 1894; Meridian, Mississippi, U.S.
- Died: May 23, 1937 (aged 43); Meridian, Mississippi, U.S.
- Batted: Left Threw: Right

MLB debut
- April 12, 1922, for the Detroit Tigers

Last MLB appearance
- September 26, 1927, for the St. Louis Cardinals

MLB statistics
- Batting average: .277
- Home runs: 5
- Runs batted in: 93
- Stats at Baseball Reference

Teams
- Detroit Tigers (1922); Boston Red Sox (1924); St. Louis Cardinals (1927)

Daniel Curren Clark (January 18, 1894 – May 23, 1937) was an American backup infielder/outfielder in Major League Baseball who played between 1922 and 1927 for the Detroit Tigers (1922), Boston Red Sox (1924) and St. Louis Cardinals (1927). Listed at 5 ft 9 in (1.75 m), 167 lb., Clark batted left-handed and threw right-handed. He was born in Meridian, Mississippi.

In a three-season career, Clark was a .277 hitter (161-for-582) with five home runs and 93 RBI in 245 games, including 75 runs, 36 doubles, eight triples, five stolen bases, and a .360 on-base percentage. Following his majors career, he played in the Texas and Three-Eye leagues.

After his baseball career ended, Clark became an oil dealer, dying in his hometown of Meridian at age 43 from tertiary neural syphilis.

== Fact ==
- Was traded by Detroit along with Howard Ehmke, Babe Herman, Carl Holling and cash to the Red Sox in exchange by Del Pratt and Rip Collins.

== Sources ==
- Baseball Reference
- Retrosheet
- The Deadball Era
