= 1928 New York Yankees season =

Season for the Major League Baseball team the New York Yankees

1928 New York Yankees
- World Series champions American League champions
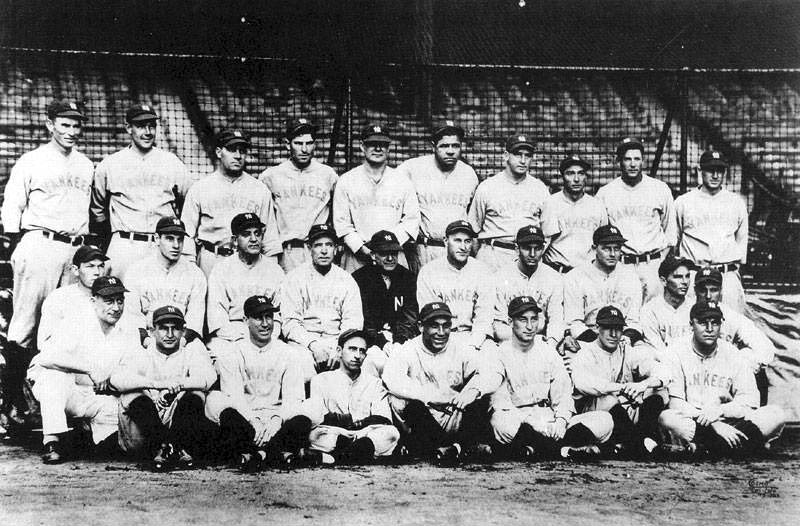
- League: American League
- Ballpark: Yankee Stadium
- City: New York City, New York
- Record: 101–53 (.656)
- League place: 1st
- Owners: Jacob Ruppert
- General managers: Ed Barrow
- Managers: Miller Huggins

The 1928 New York Yankees season was their 26th season. The team finished with a record of 101–53, winning their sixth pennant, finishing 2.5 games ahead of the Philadelphia Athletics. New York was managed by Miller Huggins. The Yankees played at Yankee Stadium. In the World Series, they swept the St. Louis Cardinals. Pitcher Urban Shocker died in September due to complications from pneumonia.

== Regular season ==
- The 1928 Yankees set a major league record by having nine players on the team who would eventually be elected to the Hall of Fame: Earle Combs, Lou Gehrig, Tony Lazzeri, Babe Ruth, Bill Dickey, Leo Durocher, Waite Hoyt, Herb Pennock, and Stan Coveleski. Manager Miller Huggins, team president Ed Barrow and owner Colonel Jacob Ruppert were also inducted.

=== Season standings ===
American League
Team	W	L	Pct.	GB	Home	Road
New York Yankees	101	53	.656	—	52‍–‍25	49‍–‍28
Philadelphia Athletics	98	55	.641	2½	52‍–‍25	46‍–‍30
St. Louis Browns	82	72	.532	19	43‍–‍34	39‍–‍38
Washington Senators	75	79	.487	26	37‍–‍43	38‍–‍36
Chicago White Sox	72	82	.468	29	37‍–‍40	35‍–‍42
Detroit Tigers	68	86	.442	33	36‍–‍41	32‍–‍45
Cleveland Indians	62	92	.403	39	28‍–‍49	34‍–‍43
Boston Red Sox	57	96	.373	43½	26‍–‍47	31‍–‍49

=== Record vs. opponents ===
1928 American League record Sources:
Team	BOS	CWS	CLE	DET	NYY	PHA	SLB	WSH
Boston	—	10–12	9–13	7–15	6–16	3–18	9–13	13–9–1
Chicago	12–10	—	12–10–1	13–9	9–13	6–16	10–12	10–12
Cleveland	13–9	10–12–1	—	10–12	6–16	6–16	7–15	10–12
Detroit	15–7	9–13	12–10	—	7–15	8–14	9–13	8–14
New York	16–6	13–9	16–6	15–7	—	16–6	12–10	13–9
Philadelphia	18–3	16–6	16–6	14–8	6–16	—	16–6	12–10
St. Louis	13–9	12–10	15–7	13–9	10–12	6–16	—	13–9
Washington	9–13–1	12–10	12–10	14–8	9–13	10–12	9–13	—

=== Roster ===
1928 New York Yankees
Roster
Pitchers: Archie Campbell; Stan Coveleski; Fred Heimach; Waite Hoyt; Hank Johnson; Wilcy Moore; Herb Pennock; George Pipgras; Rosy Ryan; Al Shealy; Urban Shocker; Myles Thomas; Tom Zachary	Catchers: Benny Bengough; Pat Collins; Bill Dickey; Johnny Grabowski; Infielders: George Burns; Joe Dugan; Leo Durocher; Mike Gazella; Lou Gehrig; Mark Koenig; Tony Lazzeri; Gene Robertson	Outfielders: Earle Combs; Cedric Durst; Bob Meusel; Ben Paschal; Babe Ruth	Manager: Miller Huggins; Coaches: Art Fletcher; Charley O'Leary

== Player stats ==
= Indicates team leader

= Indicates league leader

=== Batting ===
==== Starters by position ====
Note: Pos = Position; G = Games played; AB = At bats; H = Hits; Avg. = Batting average; HR = Home runs; RBI = Runs batted in

Pos	Player	G	AB	H	Avg.	HR	RBI
C	Johnny Grabowski	75	202	48	.238	1	21
1B	Lou Gehrig	154	562	210	.374	27	147
2B	Tony Lazzeri	116	404	134	.332	10	82
3B	Joe Dugan	94	312	86	.276	6	34
SS	Mark Koenig	132	533	170	.319	4	63
OF	Babe Ruth	154	536	173	.323	54	146
OF	Earle Combs	149	626	194	.310	7	56
OF	Bob Meusel	131	518	154	.297	11	113

==== Other batters ====
Note: G = Games played; AB = At bats; H = Hits; Avg. = Batting average; HR = Home runs; RBI = Runs batted in

Player	G	AB	H	Avg.	HR	RBI
Leo Durocher	102	296	80	.270	0	31
Gene Robertson	83	251	73	.291	1	36
Benny Bengough	58	161	43	.267	0	9
Pat Collins	70	136	30	.221	6	14
Cedric Durst	74	135	34	.252	2	10
Ben Paschal	65	79	25	.316	1	15
Mike Gazella	32	56	13	.232	0	2
Bill Dickey	10	15	3	.200	0	2
George Burns	4	4	2	.500	0	0

=== Pitching ===
==== Starting pitchers ====
Note: G = Games pitched; IP = Innings pitched; W = Wins; L = Losses; ERA = Earned run average; SO = Strikeouts

Player	G	IP	W	L	ERA	SO
George Pipgras	46	300.2	24	13	3.38	139
Hank Johnson	31	299.0	14	9	4.30	110
Waite Hoyt	42	273.0	23	7	3.36	67
Herb Pennock	28	211.0	17	6	2.56	53
Tom Zachary	7	45.2	3	3	3.94	7

Note: Waite Hoyt was team and league leader in saves with 8.

==== Other pitchers ====
Note: G = Games pitched; IP = Innings pitched; W = Wins; L = Losses; ERA = Earned run average; SO = Strikeouts

Player	G	IP	W	L	ERA	SO
Al Shealy	23	96.0	8	6	5.06	39
Fred Heimach	13	68.0	2	3	3.31	25
Stan Coveleski	12	58.0	5	1	5.74	5

==== Relief pitchers ====
Note: G = Games pitched; W = Wins; L = Losses; SV = Saves; ERA = Earned run average; SO = Strikeouts

Player	G	W	L	SV	ERA	SO
Wilcy Moore	35	4	4	2	4.18	18
Archie Campbell	13	0	1	2	5.25	9
Myles Thomas	12	1	0	0	3.41	10
Rosy Ryan	3	0	0	0	16.50	5
Urban Shocker	1	0	0	0	0.00	0

== 1928 World Series ==
Game	Date	Visitor	Score	Home	Score	Record (NYY-STL)	Attendance
1	October 4	St. Louis Cardinals	1	New York Yankees	4	1–0	61,425
2	October 5	St. Louis Cardinals	3	New York Yankees	9	2–0	60,714
3	October 7	New York Yankees	7	St. Louis Cardinals	3	3–0	39,602
4	October 9	New York Yankees	7	St. Louis Cardinals	3	4–0	37,331
New York Yankees win 4–0
