= Eli Zaret =

American sports broadcaster and journalist

Eli Zaret (born March 17, 1950) is an American sports broadcaster and journalist based in Detroit, Michigan.

Zaret was a radio and television sports reporter and author who worked in both Detroit and New York from 1974 until 2004. After leaving the news portion of his career, he joined the NBA Detroit Pistons broadcast team in 2005 as a sideline reporter and video creator. In 2018 he created a podcast called "No Filter Sports" with fellow sports reporter Bob Page and former star pitcher Denny McLain, baseball's last and only living 30-game winner.

Zaret was Detroit's first sportscaster on FM radio, beginning his career in 1974 at radio station WABX-FM. When FM radios became standard equipment in cars in 1977, his career took off. He then worked at two more Detroit stations, WJZZ-FM (1975–1978) and in November 1978 went to rock station WRIF-FM. WRIF quickly shot to #1 in the ratings as the combination of availability in cars and that album-oriented rock became the favored choice of the baby boomer generation.

While continuing as an FM sportscaster, Zaret parlayed that success to television, hired by local NBC affiliate WDIV-TV in November 1980 as a weekend sports anchor and reporter. WDIV held the broadcast rights for the Detroit Tigers, and in 1982 Zaret hosted the first local half-hour baseball pregame show in America, "Tigers'82." In 1986, he was hired away by WABC-TV in New York as the station's lead sports anchor.

In 1988, Zaret returned to Detroit, becoming sports director and lead sports anchor at WJBK-TV while also returning to radio at WCSX-FM. In 1990 he was paired with McLain for the "Eli and Denny" show on WJBK-TV. McLain, after a stint in prison in Florida had returned to Detroit as a radio talk show host at WXYT-AM. Their show was a ratings success and lasted until 1994 when McLain again ran afoul of the law. Zaret then created "The Sports Zone" for WJBK, a Sunday night wrap-up show.

In 1995, Zaret had grown weary of changes in local news coverage and left to create his own programs. After a 1-year stint at all sports WDFN-AM, he created "The Lockeroom" in 1997 with former Tigers and Dodgers baseball star Kirk Gibson and college football analyst and former NFL quarterback Gary Danielson. In its 7-year run, the show was featured on several broadcast and cable television stations as well as WXYT-AM, now an all sports station. In 2005, Zaret began a 6-year run with the Pistons.

== Early life ==
Zaret was born in Nutley, New Jersey and also lived in Huntington, New York and Springfield, Massachusetts where he graduated from High School in 1968. He studied speech communications at the University of Michigan and graduated with a Bachelor of Arts in 1972. When a college professor, Dr. Edgar Willis, told him that his gravelly voice would be a distraction to radio audiences, Zaret concentrated on other aspects of radio and television. When at a party in 1974, John Petrie, the program director at WABX-FM heard him speaking in animated fashion about sports and invited him for an audition and subsequently, a job doing sports commentaries. Unavailable in cars without a special converter, FM radio was a medium for music enthusiasts, garnering ad revenues representing a mere fraction of AM radio. That would dramatically change and have a powerfully positive effect on his career.

Despite having no television experience, Zaret's popularity on radio and with fellow baby boomers led to his hiring at WDIV at age 30.

== Other media, honors and awards ==
Zaret won five Michigan Emmy Awards for his television work and numerous radio honors for commentary and reporting. He wrote three books, "84, Last of the Great Tigers" in 2004. He followed that in 2005 with "Blue Collar Blueprint, how the Pistons constructed their championship formula." In 2006 he wrote McLain's biography, "I Told You I wasn't Perfect" which reached #3 on the ESPN best-seller list.

He created "Eli Zaret Advertising" in 2003, writing hundreds of radio and television commercials. In 2014 he created "Rules of the Game" sponsored by Ford that ran for 3 years in Detroit Tiger radio broadcasts. In 2019 he established the "No Filter Sports" podcast. In 2025 he was awarded a Lifetime Membership Award by the Detroit Sports Media Association.
