= Al Wingo =

American baseball player (1898–1964)

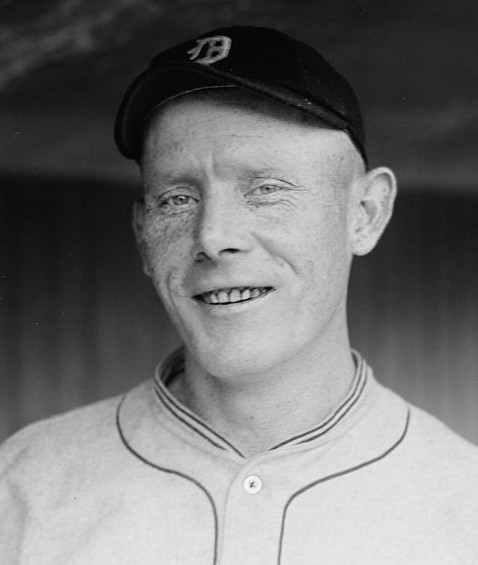
- Left fielder
- Born: May 6, 1898; Norcross, Georgia
- Died: October 9, 1964 (aged 66); Lincoln Park, Michigan
- Batted: Left Threw: Right

MLB debut
- September 9, 1919, for the Philadelphia Athletics

Last MLB appearance
- September 28, 1928, for the Detroit Tigers

MLB statistics
- Batting average: .308
- Home runs: 9
- Runs batted in: 191
- Stats at Baseball Reference

Teams
- Philadelphia Athletics (1919); Detroit Tigers (1924–1928)

Absalom Holbrook Wingo (May 6, 1898 – October 9, 1964), commonly known by the nickname "Red", was an American baseball player.

A native of Norcross, Georgia, his older brother Ivey Wingo played 17 years in Major League Baseball starting in 1911. Al "Red" Wingo began playing baseball at Oglethorpe University and played professional baseball, primarily as an outfielder, for 15 years from 1918 to 1932. He followed his older brother to the major leagues in 1919 as an outfielder for the Philadelphia Athletics.

He played for the Detroit Tigers from 1924 to 1928 and had the best season of his career in 1925 when he had a .370 batting average and a .456 on-base percentage and finished twelfth in the voting for the American League Most Valuable Player award. He also led the American League's left fielders in 1925 with eight double plays turned. In five major league seasons, Wingo compiled a .308 career batting average. He later played for the San Francisco Seals of the Pacific Coast League from 1929 to 1931.

== Early years ==
Wingo was born in Norcross, Georgia, in 1898. He attended Oglethorpe University in suburban Atlanta where he played as a catcher and a pitcher for the Oglethorpe Stormy Petrels baseball team during the 1917 and 1918 seasons. Wingo's older brother Ivey Wingo reached the major leagues in 1911 and became a fixture for the St. Louis Cardinals and Cincinnati Reds from 1911 to 1926.

== Professional baseball ==
=== Minor leagues ===
Wingo began playing professional baseball with the Atlanta Crackers of the Southern Association in 1918. The following year, he played for the Greenville Spinners in the South Atlantic League, compiling a .319 batting average in 360 at bats.

=== Philadelphia Athletics ===
Wingo was acquired by the Philadelphia Athletics late in the 1919 season and made his major league debut on September 9, 1919. He appeared in 15 games for the 1919 Athletics, compiling a .305 batting average in 59 at bats. Despite his strong batting average, Wingo returned to the minor leagues, playing for the Atlanta Crackers in 1920 and 1921 and for the Toronto Maple Leafs in 1922 and 1923. In 1922, he set a new International League record with 34 home runs. He followed up with a .352 batting average and 20 home runs in 1923.

=== Detroit Tigers ===
On August 20, 1923, the Toronto club sold Wingo to the Detroit Tigers for $50,000 with the caveat that he need not report to the Tigers until Toronto's season was over. In 1924, he appeared in 78 games for the Tigers, mostly as a pinch hitter but also in 30 games as a starter in the outfield.

In 1925, Wingo took over from Heinie Manush as the Tigers' starting left fielder. He appeared in 130 games and had the best season of his career. He led that American League's left fielders with eight double plays turned and ranked among the league leaders with a .370 batting average (fifth), .456 on-base percentage (fifth), 104 runs scored (ninth) and a 5.3 wins above replacement rating for position players (sixth). All three Detroit outfielders in 1925 ranked among the league's batting leaders -- Wingo with a .370 average, Harry Heilmann winning the batting title with a .393 average and Ty Cobb with a .378 average. At the end of the 1925 season, Wingo finished twelfth in the American League Most Valuable Player voting.

In 1926, Wingo appeared in 108 games for the Tigers, but lost his job as the team's regular left fielder, starting 57 games in left field and 11 in right field, as his batting average dropped by 88 points to .282. His playing time declined to 75 games in 1927 as his batting average dropped further to .234. In his final year in the major leagues, he appeared in 87 games for the 1928 Tigers and compiled a .285 batting average.

In six major league seasons, Wingo appeared in 493 games, scored 224 runs, collected 409 hits (including 115 extra base hits), 191 RBIs, and 211 bases on balls. Boosted by his 1925 season, Wingo had a career .308 batting average, with a .404 on-base percentage and a .423 slugging percentage.

=== Minor leagues ===
After the 1928 season, Wingo was acquired on waivers by the San Francisco Seals of the Pacific Coast League. The deal was combined with the Tigers' January 1929 purchase of Roy Johnson with Wingo being given a value of $7,500 for purposes of the transaction. Wingo played in the outfield for the Seals and compiled batting averages of .350 in 1929, .348 in 1930, and .314 in 1931. In May 1931, he became the first player to hit a home run out of the Seals' new ballpark. He continued to play for the Chattanooga Lookouts (Southern Association) in 1931 and the Scranton Miners (New York-Penn League) and Toronto Maple Leafs (International League) in 1932.

== Later years ==
In January 1934, Wingo returned to Detroit and played for the Tivoli club in the Detroit Baseball Federation. After retiring from baseball, he remained in Detroit and worked as a driver and safety inspector for Ford Motor Company. In October 1964, Wingo was involved in a traffic accident in Allen Park, Michigan, in which his truck was struck from behind by a driver who had been drinking. Wingo was thrown from the cab of his truck and dragged under the truck until it hit a fence. He was taken to Outer Park Hospital in Lincoln Park, Michigan, where he died at age 66.
