= Ollie Sax =

American baseball player (1904-1982)

- Third baseman
- Born: November 5, 1904; Branford, Connecticut, U.S.
- Died: March 21, 1982 (aged 77); Newark, New Jersey, U.S.
- Batted: Right Threw: Right

MLB debut
- April 13, 1928, for the St. Louis Browns

Last MLB appearance
- September 30, 1928, for the St. Louis Browns

MLB statistics
- Batting average: .176
- Home runs: 0
- Runs batted in: 0
- Stats at Baseball Reference

Teams
- St. Louis Browns (1928)

Erik Oliver Sax (November 5, 1904 – March 21, 1982) was a Major League Baseball player. Sax played third base for the St. Louis Browns in the 1928 season. In 16 games, he had three hits in 17 at-bats, with four runs scored. Sax batted and threw right-handed.

He was born in Branford, Connecticut, and died in Newark, New Jersey.
