= Ike Danning =

American baseball player (1905-1983)

- Catcher
- Born: January 20, 1905; Los Angeles, California, U.S.
- Died: March 30, 1983 (aged 78); Santa Monica, California, U.S.
- Batted: Right Threw: Right

MLB debut
- September 21, 1928, for the St. Louis Browns

Last MLB appearance
- September 30, 1928, for the St. Louis Browns

MLB statistics
- Games played: 2
- At bats: 6
- Hits: 3
- Stats at Baseball Reference

Teams
- St. Louis Browns (1928)

Isaac Danning (January 20, 1905 – March 30, 1983) was an American Major League Baseball catcher who played for the St. Louis Browns in 1928. His brother, Harry Danning, played for the New York Giants from 1933 to 1942. He was Jewish. He attended Polytechnic High School in Los Angeles, California.

After his retirement from baseball he became the head of transportation for 20th Century Fox Studios. He died from lung cancer at the age of 78 and was buried at Hillside Memorial Park in Culver City, California.
