= Ossie Orwoll =

American football and baseball player (1900–1967)

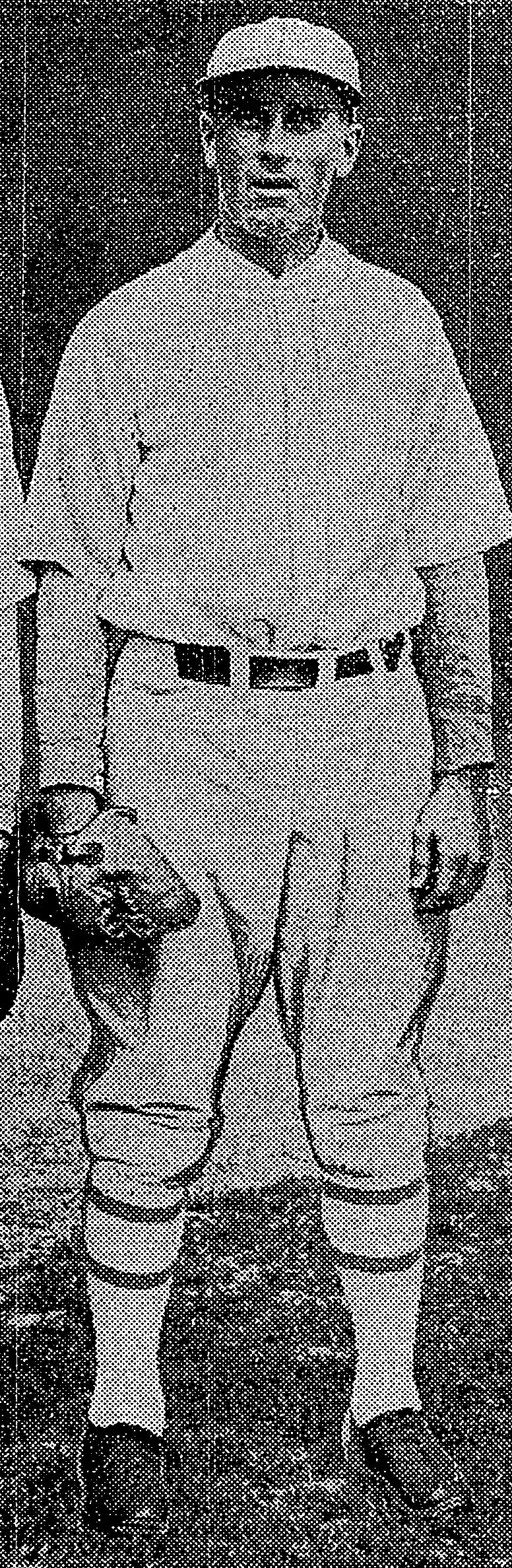
- Pitcher/First baseman/Outfielder
- Born: November 17, 1900; Portland, Oregon, U.S.
- Died: May 8, 1967 (aged 66); Decorah, Iowa, U.S.
- Batted: Left Threw: Left

MLB debut
- April 13, 1928, for the Philadelphia Athletics

Last MLB appearance
- August 21, 1929, for the Philadelphia Athletics

MLB statistics
- Win–loss record: 6–7
- Earned run average: 4.63
- Strikeouts: 65
- Batting average: .294
- Home runs: 0
- Runs batted in: 28
- Stats at Baseball Reference

Teams
- Philadelphia Athletics (1928–1929)

Oswald Christian Orwoll (November 17, 1900 – May 8, 1967) was an American professional baseball and professional football player. Listed as 6 feet (1.8 m) tall and 174 pounds (79 kg), Orwoll batted and threw left-handed. He was born in Portland, Oregon, and attended Luther College of Decorah, Iowa.

Orwoll's ten-year pro baseball career began in the high minors in 1926. He played in Major League Baseball as a pitcher and first baseman for the Philadelphia Athletics for the full seasons of 1928 and 1929. Orwoll finished with a career record of 6–7 in 39 games pitched (eight starts) and a .294 batting average with 65 hits (15 doubles and three triples) and 28 RBIs in 94 total MLB games. In the field, Orwoll started 33 MLB games at first base and seven as an outfielder.

He was a member of Connie Mack's 1929 World Series championship team—one of the strongest clubs in MLB history—but did not appear in any games during the Series, played against the Chicago Cubs and won by Philadelphia in five games. On November 29, 1930, the Athletics traded him, with Homer Summa, to the Portland Beavers of the Pacific Coast League for Herb Lahti. Orwoll never returned to the majors, retiring from baseball in 1935.

Orwoll also played halfback for the Milwaukee Badgers of the National Football League (NFL) in 1926.
