= Lee Daney =

American baseball player (1904-1988)

- Pitcher
- Born: July 9, 1904; Talihina, Oklahoma, U.S.
- Died: March 11, 1988 (aged 83); Phoenix, Arizona, U.S.
- Batted: Right Threw: Right

MLB debut
- May 25, 1928, for the Philadelphia Athletics

Last MLB appearance
- May 25, 1928, for the Philadelphia Athletics

MLB statistics
- Win–loss record: 0–0
- Earned run average: 0.00
- Strikeouts: 0
- Stats at Baseball Reference

Teams
- Philadelphia Athletics (1928)

Arthur Lee Daney (July 9, 1904 – March 11, 1988) was an American Major League Baseball pitcher. He played for the Philadelphia Athletics during the 1928 season.

Daney's father was a full-blooded Choctaw and his mother was one-half Choctaw and one-half Irish. He was the youngest of eleven children and attended the Haskell Institute. Athletics coach Ira Thomas discovered Daney playing semi-pro baseball in Denver and signed him to a contract before the start of the 1928 season.
