= Ed Strelecki =

American baseball player (1905–1968)

- Pitcher
- Born: April 10, 1905; Newark, New Jersey, U.S.
- Died: January 9, 1968 (aged 62); Newark, New Jersey, U.S.
- Batted: Right Threw: Right

MLB debut
- April 16, 1928, for the St. Louis Browns

Last MLB appearance
- September 20, 1931, for the Cincinnati Reds

MLB statistics
- Win–loss record: 1–3
- Earned run average: 5.78
- Strikeouts: 13
- Stats at Baseball Reference

Teams
- St. Louis Browns (1928–1929); Cincinnati Reds (1931)

Edward Harold Strelecki (April 10, 1905 – January 9, 1968) was an American Major League Baseball pitcher who played for the St. Louis Browns in 1928 and 1929 and with the Cincinnati Reds in 1931.
