= Archie Campbell (baseball) =

American baseball player (1903–1989)

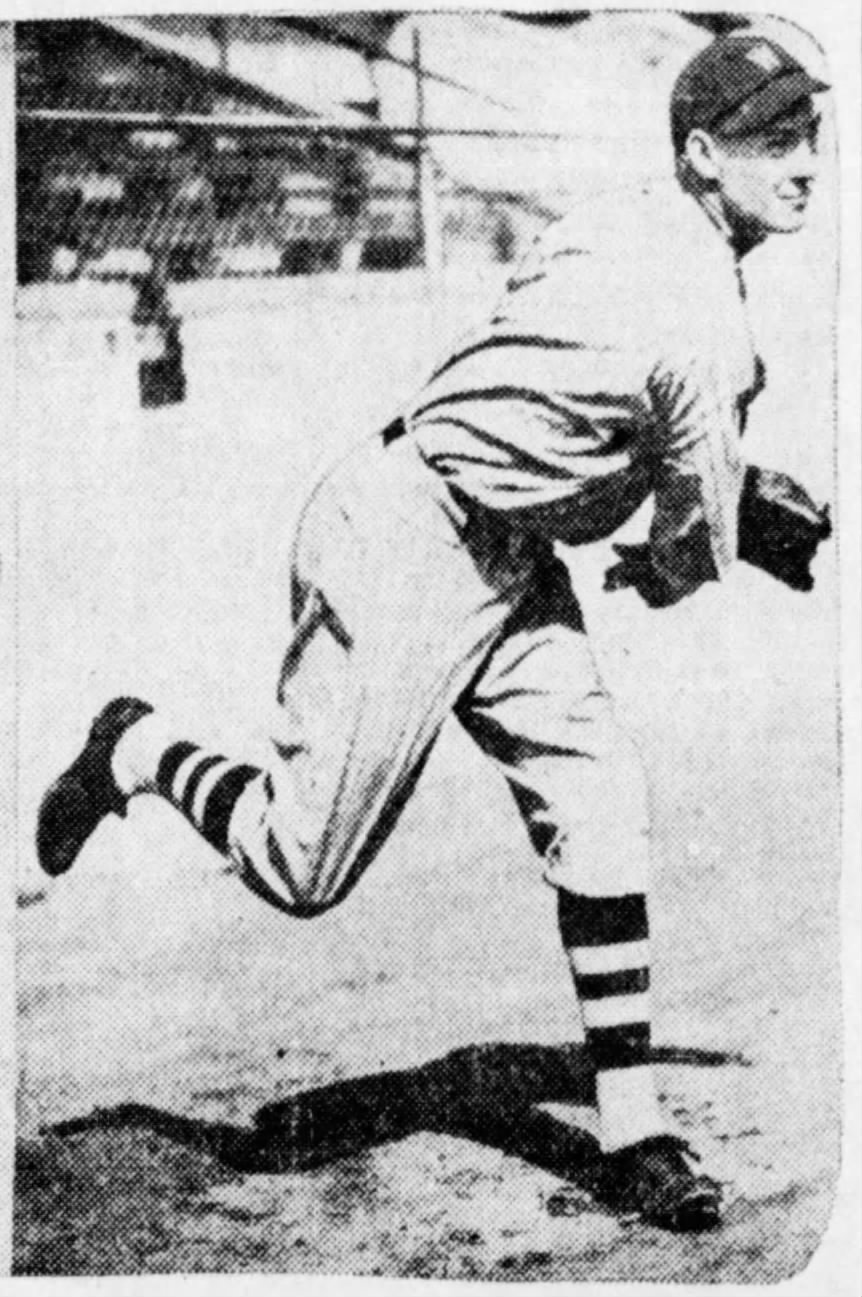
- Campbell with the Senators in 1929
- Pitcher
- Born: October 20, 1903; Maplewood, New Jersey, U.S.
- Died: December 22, 1989 (aged 86); Sparks, Nevada, U.S.
- Batted: Right Threw: Right

MLB debut
- April 21, 1928, for the New York Yankees

Last MLB appearance
- July 24, 1930, for the Cincinnati Reds

MLB statistics
- Win–loss record: 2–6
- Earned run average: 5.86
- Strikeouts: 29
- Stats at Baseball Reference

Teams
- New York Yankees (1928); Washington Senators (1929); Cincinnati Reds (1930)

Career highlights and awards
- World Series champion (1928)

Archibald Stewart "Iron Man" Campbell (October 20, 1903 – December 22, 1989) was a Major League Baseball pitcher for the New York Yankees in the 1928 season. He also played with the Washington Senators in 1929 and the Cincinnati Reds in 1930. Campbell pitched in 40 games in parts of three seasons, chiefly as a reliever, with two wins, six losses and a 5.86 ERA. Campbell batted and threw right-handed.

Born in Maplewood, New Jersey, Campbell moved to Sparks, Nevada in 1947 and remained there for the rest of his life, dying at Sierra Health Care Center in Reno at age 86.
