= Eddie Kenna =

American baseball player (1897-1972)

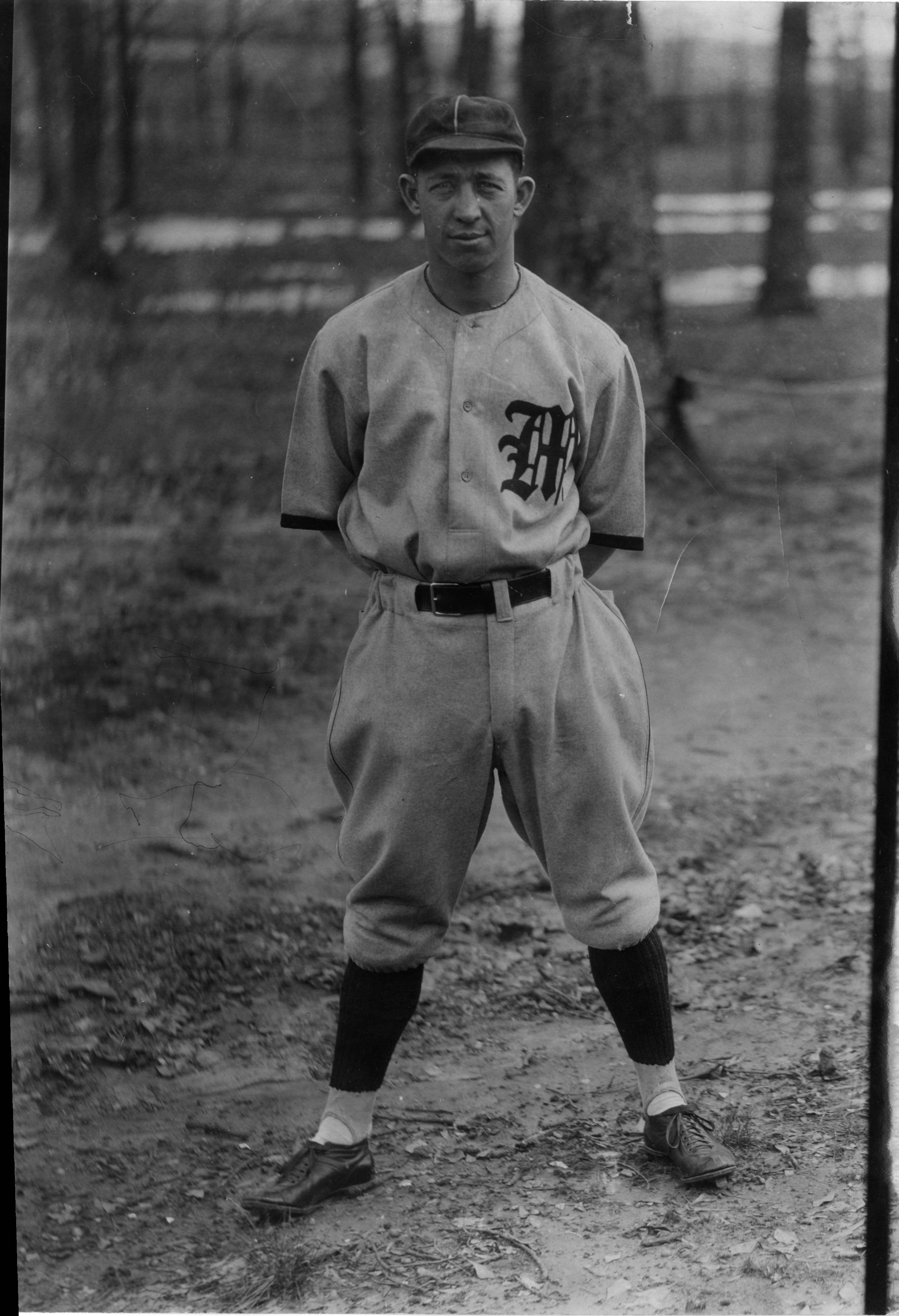
- Catcher
- Born: September 30, 1897; San Francisco, California, U.S.
- Died: August 21, 1972 (aged 74); San Francisco, California, U.S.
- Batted: Right Threw: Right

MLB debut
- June 2, 1928, for the Washington Senators

Last MLB appearance
- September 5, 1928, for the Washington Senators

MLB statistics
- Batting average: .297
- Home runs: 1
- Runs batted in: 20
- Stats at Baseball Reference

Teams
- Washington Senators (1928)

Edward Aloysius "Scrap Iron" Kenna (September 30, 1897 - August 21, 1972) was an American Major League Baseball catcher. He played part of one season, 1928, for the Washington Senators. That season, he served as the primary backup to starting catcher Muddy Ruel, playing in 33 games at that position.

Kenna's minor league baseball career spanned 17 years. He began playing professionally in 1920, playing one game for the Vernon Tigers of the Pacific Coast League. In 1936, Kenna's last year as a player, he served as player-manager of the Portsmouth Pirates of the Middle Atlantic League.

== Sources ==
- Career statistics from Baseball Reference · Baseball Reference (Minors) · Retrosheet · Baseball Almanac
