= Ole Olsen (baseball) =

American baseball player (1894–1980)

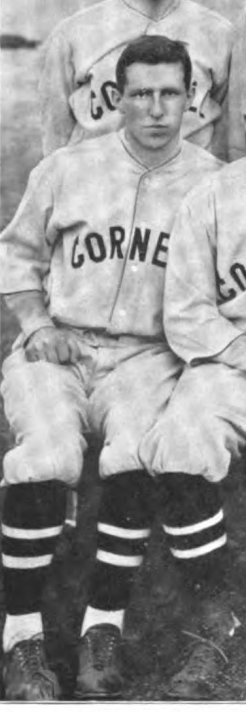
- Olsen at Cornell in 1918
- Pitcher
- Born: September 12, 1894; South Norwalk, Connecticut, U.S.
- Died: September 12, 1980 (aged 86); Norwalk, Connecticut, U.S.
- Batted: Right Threw: Right

MLB debut
- April 12, 1922, for the Detroit Tigers

Last MLB appearance
- September 24, 1923, for the Detroit Tigers

MLB statistics
- Win–loss record: 8–7
- Earned run average: 4.95
- Strikeouts: 64
- Stats at Baseball Reference

Teams
- Detroit Tigers (1922–1923)

Arthur Ole Olsen (September 12, 1894 – September 12, 1980) was an American baseball pitcher. He played professional baseball for nine years from 1921 to 1929, including two seasons in Major League Baseball with the Detroit Tigers in 1922 and 1923. He compiled an 8–7 win–loss record and a 4.95 earned run average (ERA) in 54 major league games. He also played seven years in the minor leagues and played college baseball at Cornell University.

== Early years ==
Olsen was born in South Norwalk, Connecticut, in 1894. He graduated from Norwalk High School in 1913 and then attended Cornell University where he played for the Cornell Big Red baseball team. His college career was interrupted by military service during World War I. After being discharged from the military, he returned to Cornell and served as the captain of Cornell's baseball team in 1919.

== Professional baseball ==
Olsen debuted with the Tigers in 1922, appearing in 37 games — 15 as a starter and 22 as a reliever. He compiled a record of 7-6 with five complete games with a 4.53 earned run average (ERA). In 1923, he appeared in 17 games, only two as a starter, and had a record of 1-1 with an ERA of 6.31.

Interviewed in 1976, Olsen recalled striking out Babe Ruth on June 14, 1922, with two runners on base and the Tigers leading, 4-2. Olsen recalled that, when Babe stepped to the plate, he tried to rattle the rookie pitcher by calling him an SOB and telling him to "throw the ball and duck." Olsen responded by calling Babe "a big baboon" and striking him out. An account in The New York Times confirms that Olsen struck out Ruth with two men on base in the bottom of the fifth inning and with the Tigers leading, 4-2.

Olsen also pitched for seven years in the minor leagues, including stints with the Syracuse Stars of the International League in 1921 and 1926, the Birmingham Barons of the Southern Association in 1924, the Nashville Volunteers of the Southern Association in 1924 and 1925, the Kansas City Blues of the American Association from 1925 to 1927, and the Atlanta Crackers of the Southern Association in 1928 and 1929. He compiled a 63-63 record in 226 minor league games.

== Later years ==
After retiring from baseball, Olsen worked for 37 years for a liquor manufacturer. He and his wife, Margaret Mary, lived in the same house in Rowayton, Connecticut, for almost 50 years. He died in 1980 on his 86th birthday in Norwalk, Connecticut.
