= Joe Hassler =

American baseball player (1905–1971)

- Shortstop
- Born: April 7, 1905; Fort Smith, Arkansas, U.S.
- Died: September 4, 1971 (aged 66); Duncan, Oklahoma, U.S.
- Batted: Right Threw: Right

MLB debut
- May 26, 1928, for the Philadelphia Athletics

Last MLB appearance
- September 16, 1930, for the St. Louis Browns

MLB statistics
- Batting average: .239
- Home runs: 0
- Runs batted in: 4
- Stats at Baseball Reference

Teams
- Philadelphia Athletics (1928–1929); St. Louis Browns (1930)

Joseph Frederick Hassler (April 7, 1905 – September 4, 1971) was an American professional baseball shortstop. He played in Major League Baseball (MLB) for the Philadelphia Athletics and St. Louis Browns.

Hassler was a pitcher as a schoolboy and only began playing the infield when he joined a semi-pro team in his native Fort Smith, Arkansas in 1923. He was playing for a minor league team in Blytheville, Arkansas in 1926 when the league folded and he was picked up by the Athletics, who farmed him out to minor league teams for the remainder of that year and the following year.
