= Josh Billings (pitcher) =

American baseball player (1907–1983)

- Pitcher
- Born: September 27, 1907; New York, New York, U.S.
- Died: December 26, 1983 (aged 76); Greenbrae, California, U.S.
- Batted: Right Threw: Right

MLB debut
- August 17, 1927, for the Detroit Tigers

Last MLB appearance
- August 5, 1929, for the Detroit Tigers

MLB statistics
- Win–loss record: 10–15
- Earned run average: 5.02
- Strikeouts: 67
- Stats at Baseball Reference

Teams
- Detroit Tigers (1927–1929)

Haskell Clark "Josh" Billings (September 27, 1907 – December 26, 1983) was an American Major League Baseball (MLB) pitcher who played for the Detroit Tigers.

== Amateur career ==
Billings was born in New York City, New York and played college baseball at Brown University. While at Brown, he pitched for the Falmouth town team in the Cape Cod Baseball League during the summers of 1925 to 1927. Named team MVP in 1925, Billings was described as "studious" and "persevering", and a "brilliant player". He also played for the ice hockey team in 1927.

== Professional career ==
He joined the Tigers in 1927 and made his major league debut on August 17, becoming the third youngest player in the American League that season. In 1927, he pitched in ten games and 67 innings for the Tigers, and was credited with five wins against four losses. His earned run average (ERA) of 4.87 was worse than the league average. He had more than twice as many walks (39) as strikeouts (18).

Despite his underwhelming statistics in 1927, Billings was the Tigers Opening Day starting pitcher in 1928. The Tigers lost that game by a score of 4–1 to the St. Louis Browns at Briggs Stadium. In total, Billings pitched in 21 games and 110 2/3 innings for the Tigers in 1928. He was once again credited with five wins, this time against ten losses. Once again, he had a worse than league average earned run average of 5.12. And once again he had more walks (59) than strikeouts (48). He also had the fourth highest number of wild pitches in the American League, with seven. As a 20-year-old, he was still the eighth youngest player in the American League in 1928.

1929 was Billings's last season in the Major Leagues. As a 21-year-old, he only pitched in eight games and 19 1/3 innings for the Tigers. He had no wins and one loss. His earned run average was again 5.12, again worse than league average. He surrendered nine walks against a single strikeout. He played in his final game on August 5, 1929.

For his career, Billings pitched in 39 games and 197 innings. He won 10 games against 15 losses. His career earned run average was 5.03, and he had 107 walks and 67 strikeouts. As a batter, he had 17 hits in 68 at bats for a batting average of .250. He also was credited with three doubles, one triple, 11 runs scored and six runs batted in.
