= Chick Gagnon =

American baseball player (1897–1970)

- Shortstop
- Born: September 27, 1897; Milbury, Massachusetts, U.S.
- Died: April 30, 1970 (aged 72); Wilmington, Delaware, U.S.
- Batted: Right Threw: Right

MLB debut
- June 27, 1922, for the Detroit Tigers

Last MLB appearance
- July 10, 1924, for the Washington Senators

MLB statistics
- Games played: 14
- At bats: 9
- Hits: 2
- Stats at Baseball Reference

Teams
- Detroit Tigers (1922); Washington Senators (1924)

Harold Dennis "Chick" Gagnon (September 27, 1897 – April 30, 1970) was an American shortstop in Major League Baseball. He played for the Detroit Tigers and Washington Senators.
