= Al Bool =

American baseball player (1897–1981)

- Catcher
- Born: August 24, 1897; Lincoln, Nebraska, U.S.
- Died: September 27, 1981 (aged 84); Lincoln, Nebraska, U.S.
- Batted: Right Threw: Right

MLB debut
- September 29, 1928, for the Washington Senators

Last MLB appearance
- September 27, 1931, for the Boston Braves

MLB statistics
- Batting average: .237
- Home runs: 7
- Runs batted in: 53
- Stats at Baseball Reference

Teams
- Washington Senators (1928); Pittsburgh Pirates (1930); Boston Braves (1931)

Albert Bool (August 24, 1897 – September 27, 1981) was an American professional baseball player. He played in Major League Baseball as a catcher between 1928 and 1931 for the Washington Senators (1928), Pittsburgh Pirates (1930), and the Boston Braves (1931). After retiring from baseball he returned to the family farm near Lincoln where he farmed the rest of his life. He died at age 84 in a farming accident.
