= Chick Galloway =

American baseball player (1896–1969)

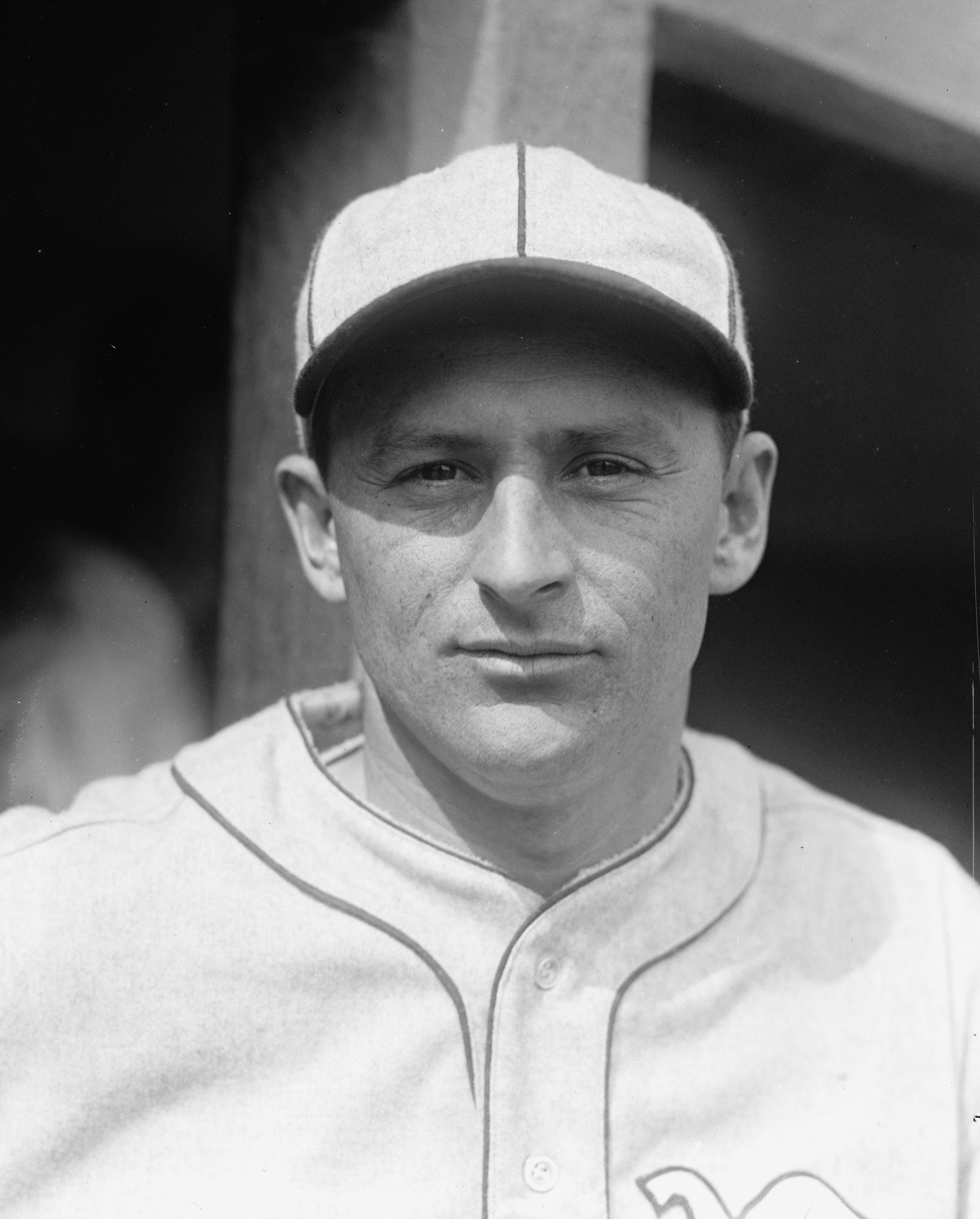
- Shortstop
- Born: August 4, 1896; Clinton, South Carolina, U.S.
- Died: November 7, 1969 (aged 73); Clinton, South Carolina, U.S.
- Batted: Right Threw: Right

MLB debut
- September 9, 1919, for the Philadelphia Athletics

Last MLB appearance
- July 25, 1928, for the Detroit Tigers

MLB statistics
- Batting average: .264
- Home runs: 17
- Runs batted in: 407
- Stats at Baseball Reference

Teams
- Philadelphia Athletics (1919–1927); Detroit Tigers (1928)

Clarence Edward (Chick) Galloway (August 4, 1896 – November 7, 1969) was an American shortstop in Major League Baseball. From 1919 through 1928, Galloway played for the Philadelphia Athletics (1919–27) and Detroit Tigers (1928). He batted and threw right-handed. In a ten-season career, Galloway was a .264 hitter with 17 home runs and 407 RBI in 1076 games.

Galloway played football and basketball while attending Presbyterian College in South Carolina.

A native of Clinton, South Carolina, Galloway was the starting shortstop for the Philadelphia Athletics during six seasons until an accident shortened his career. He debuted with the A's in 1919, becoming a regular in 1921.

Galloway appeared in the AL Most Valuable Player ballot for three consecutive years (1922–24). His most productive season came in 1922, when he posted career highs in batting average (.324), runs (83), hits (185) and triples (nine), and led the American League in games played (155).

Galloway got married on April 3, 1924, to Sarah Max Barnes "in the presence of a small company of immediate relatives and intimate friends". The ceremony took place in Landrum, South Carolina, officiated by the local Presbyterian minister who was a former classmate of Galloway's. The couple planned to live in Philadelphia during the summer months and would winter in Greenwood, South Carolina. The bride was a graduate of Intermont College in Bristol, Vermont and her father was the Greenwood county court secretary.

In 1927, Galloway was seriously injured when an errant pitch during a batting practice fractured his skull. He played for the Detroit Tigers a year later, but his career ended after playing 53 games that season.

Following his playing career, Galloway returned to Clinton and coached for the Presbyterian College, where he graduated in the 1910s. He also worked as a talent scout for the Cincinnati Reds, Philadelphia Athletics and Milwaukee Braves. Galloway was a baseball icon in his hometown, where he died at age 73.
