= Lil Stoner =

American baseball player (1899–1966)

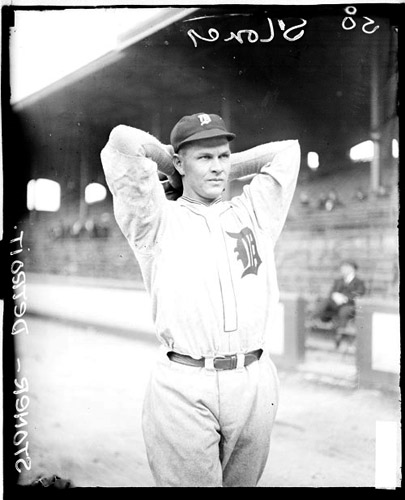
- Image from Chicago Daily News negatives collection, Chicago History Museum.
- Pitcher
- Born: February 28, 1899; Bowie, Texas, U.S.
- Died: June 26, 1966 (aged 67); Enid, Oklahoma, U.S.
- Batted: Right Threw: Right

MLB debut
- April 15, 1922, for the Detroit Tigers

Last MLB appearance
- June 10, 1931, for the Philadelphia Phillies

MLB statistics
- Win–loss record: 50–57
- Earned run average: 4.76
- Strikeouts: 299
- Stats at Baseball Reference

Teams
- Detroit Tigers (1922, 1924–1929); Pittsburgh Pirates (1930); Philadelphia Phillies (1931)

Ulysses Simpson Grant "Lil" Stoner (February 28, 1899 – June 26, 1966), also known as Lil E. Stoner, was an American professional baseball player. A right-handed pitcher, he played professional baseball for 14 seasons from 1919 to 1933, including nine years in Major League Baseball with the Detroit Tigers (1922 and 1924–1929), Pittsburgh Pirates (1930) and Philadelphia Phillies (1931). He appeared in 229 major league games and compiled a 50–57 win–loss record and a 4.76 earned run average (ERA).

Stoner worked at bakery starting at age 16, developed a reputation as a skilled baker, and was sometimes known by the nickname, the "Bowie Baker Boy". He was also a competitive breeder of flowers, specializing in irises.

With the popularization of the word "stoner" in cannabis culture, he saw a resurgence of popularity. In a 2017 poll by Ranker, he was voted No. 9 on a list of "The Best Baseball Names of All Time".

== Early years ==
Stoner was born in 1899 in Bowie, Texas. He grew up in a family of 17 children. His given name was "Ulysses Simpson Grant Stoner", a reference to the 18th President of the United States. His brothers, Benjamin Franklin Stoner, Theodore Roosevelt Stoner, and Washington Irving Stoner, were also named after famous Americans.

Stoner acquired his nickname when a younger sister could not pronounce his given name, Ulysses, and instead began calling him "Lil". Stoner later recalled of the nickname, "It stuck as I grew up."

In 1913, at age 14, he pitched for the South Side Baptist Church of Fort Worth, Texas, in the Twilight League. He gained acclaim when, at age 14, and while still wearing short pants, he pitched a shutout game against a team of adults. His family later moved to Okmulgee, Oklahoma, where he played semi-professional baseball for the Empire Refining Company team. With Stoner pitching, Empire Refining won the Oklahoma championship in 1918 and 1919.

== Professional baseball ==
=== Minor leagues ===
Stoner began his professional baseball career in 1919 with the Oklahoma City Indians of the Western League. He compiled a 12–15 win–loss record in 1919 and remained with Oklahoma City for three seasons. He finished the 1921 season with the Okmulgee Drillers of the Western Association.

=== The sharp breaking curve ===
Stoner was known for combining "a terrific fast ball with exceptional control" and "a sharp breaking curve". Mark Koenig of the New York Yankees recalled that "Stoner had one of the best curve balls in the league." He was also called a "smokeball artist" for the speed with which he threw the baseball.

The unusual movement on Stoner's breaking ball has been attributed to an injury sustained when he was a toddler. The index finger on his throwing hand was severed in a wood-chopping accident and left "hanging by a piece of flesh." The doctor bandaged the finger which reattached itself, but crookedly, a deformity that was credited with allowing Stoner to throw the ball with unusual movement.

=== Detroit Tigers (1922) ===
In 1922, Stoner joined the Detroit Tigers. He made his major league debut in a losing effort against the Cleveland Indians on April 15, 1922. He won his first game on April 21, 1922, by a 15–6 score against the Indians. His ERA climbed to 7.04, and he was demoted to the Birmingham Barons where he finished the season.

=== Fort Worth Panthers ===
Stoner remained in the minors in 1923, playing for the Fort Worth Panthers. He appeared in 48 games for the Panthers and led the team to the Texas League pennant with a career-high 27 wins, a.711 winning percentage, and a 2.65 ERA. He also pitched three post-season games, including two as the winning pitcher, to help the Panthers win the 1923 Dixie Series championship.

=== Detroit Tigers (1923–1929) ===
In October 1923, Stoner was reacquired by the Tigers. During the 1924 season, he appeared in 36 games for the Tigers and compiled an 11–10 record and a 4.72 ERA. He also had his best major league season totals in games started (25), innings pitched (215-2/3), and strikeouts (66). He also hit two home runs during the 1924 season – the only two of his career.

In 1925, Stoner appeared in 34 games for Detroit, 18 as a starter, and compiled a 10–9 record and 4.26 ERA. It was his second consecutive and final major league season with a winning record. As a batter, he had the best season of his career with a .291 batting average, six doubles, a triple, and 10 runs scored in only 55 at bats.

Stoner continued with the Tigers in 1926, appearing in 32 games, 22 as a starter, and compiling a 7–10 record with a 5.47 ERA and 57 strikeouts. His 3.213 strikeouts per nine innings pitched ranked in the top ten in the American League, and his perfect fielding percentage of 1.000 ranked first among the league's pitchers. On June 28, 1926, Stoner gave up a massive home run by Babe Ruth. The ball went over the right-center field wall and was estimated to have traveled between 600 and 626 feet. It was the longest home run of Ruth's career and in 1965 was referred to as "probably the longest home run ever hit in Detroit."

In 1927, Stoner's ERA dropped by 1.5 points to a career-low 3.98, and he appeared in a career-high 38 games for the Tigers, including 24 starts. Despite the improvement, he registered a losing record of 10–13.

Stoner's production declined in his final two years with the Tigers. He started only 11 games in 1928 and was used principally in 25 relief appearances. In 1929, he started only three games and made 21 relief appearances for a total of 53 innings pitched.

=== 1930–1933 ===
In late July 1929, the Tigers sold Stoner back to the Fort Worth Panthers. Pitching for Fort Worth in the second half of the season, he compiled a 6–4 record and a career-low 2.00 ERA.

In mid-September 1929, the Pittsburgh Pirates purchased Stoner from Fort Worth. He began the 1930 season with the Pirates but pitched only 5 2/3 regular seasons innings for the club, compiling a 4.76 ERA. In mid-May, the Pirates released Stoner outright to the Fort Worth Panthers.

Following his return to Fort Worth, Stoner appeared in 30 games, compiling a 14–6 record and a 3.19 ERA. On July 30, 1930, he struck out 18 strikeouts in a game against the San Antonio Indians. It was the most strikeouts by a Texas League pitcher since 1909.

In September 1931, following another strong showing in Fort Worth, the Philadelphia Phillies purchased Stoner from the Fort Worth club. He suffered from a hand injury that limited his playing time with the Phillies. He appeared in only 13 2/3 innings for the Phillies, compiling a 6.59 ERA. He appeared in his final major league game on June 10, 1931.

Stoner was returned by the Phillies to Fort Worth in mid-June 1931. It was Stoner's third stint with the Panthers. He appeared in 13 games for Fort Worth in 1931, 12 as a starter, and compiled an 8–3 record and 2.60 ERA.

On August 12, 1931, the Fort Worth club sold Stoner to the Newark Bears of the International League. He appeared in 10 games for Newark, compiling a 2–0 record and a 5.34 ERA.

When Newark failed to win the International League pennant, Stoner was returned to Fort Worth. He began the 1932 season with Fort Worth. He pitched poorly to start the season and was granted an outright release on June 7, 1932. The release left Stoner out of work for the first time in 15 years. He was then signed by the Omaha Packers of the Western League where he won four straight games with no losses. At the end of June, and based on his showing at Omaha, Stoner was purchased by the Houston Buffaloes of the Texas League. He was released by Houston in August 1932.

Stoner signed with the Tulsa Oilers prior to the 1933 season. but he was given an outright release by that club on April 24, 1933.

=== Semi-pro baseball ===
After being released by Tulsa, Stoner returned to Okmulgee where he managed the local baseball club from 1933 to 1935. He also served as player-manager for a semipro baseball team from Mount Pleasant, Texas, during the 1938 season. In 1939 and 1940, Stoner played semi-pro ball for the Enid Champlins of Enid, Oklahoma.

== Family and later years ==
In August 1940, at age 41, Stoner announced his retirement from baseball in order to allow him to devote his full time to a job with the oil refinery that sponsored the Enid semi-pro club.

Because of his love of baking and cooking, Stoner was sometimes known during his playing career as the "Bowie Baker Boy". He had worked at a bakery in Fort Worth, Texas, starting at age 16. In 1929, a nationally syndicated newspaper story called Stoner the "Best Cook in Baseball" and a "culinary artist." According to the report, his cooking was the envy of the women of Okmulgee. The crowning achievement of his off-season after the 1928 season was a three-tiered birthday cake made of orange sponge cake "ornamented with green icing and lavishly decorated with paper leaves and flowers."

Stoner was also an avid grower of irises and was an accredited judge of the American Iris Society. His "proudest botanical accomplishment" was his creation of "a pink iris hybrid." He was also a fan of the opera and amassed a large collection of opera records.

Stoner died following a six-day hospitalization in Enid, Oklahoma in June 1966. He was 67 years old when he died. He was buried at Enid Memorial Park.

With the popularization of the word "stoner" in cannabis culture, Stoner has seen a resurgence of popularity. In 2015, baseball writer Grant Brisbee picked "Lil Stoner" as the best presidential-inspired nickname in baseball history. Brisbee wrote: "A supremely unique, fantastic, and awesome name. A magnificent, evocative, delightful name." He speculated that, if Stoner played in contemporary times, "jersey sales would shoot through the roof." In 2017, a poll by Ranker received more than 13,000 votes and placed Stoner at No. 9 on its list of "The Best Baseball Names of All Time".

== MLB statistics ==
SEASON	TEAM	GP	GS	IP	H	R	ER	BB	SO	W	L	ERA
1922	DET	17	7	62.2	76	53	49	35	18	4	4	7.04
1924	DET	36	25	215.2	271	130	113	65	66	11	10	4.72
1925	DET	34	18	152.0	166	79	72	53	51	10	9	4.26
1926	DET	32	22	159.2	179	115	97	63	57	7	10	5.47
1927	DET	38	24	215.0	251	118	95	77	63	10	13	3.98
1928	DET	36	11	126.1	151	75	61	42	29	5	8	4.35
1929	DET	24	3	53.0	57	37	31	31	12	3	3	5.26
1930	PIT	5	0	5.2	7	3	3	3	1	0	0	4.76
1931	PHI	7	1	13.2	22	13	10	5	2	0	0	6.59
Total	—	229	111	1003.2	1180	623	531	374	299	50	57	4.76

Key

- GP: Games Played
- GS: Games Starts
- IP: Innings Pitched
- H: Hits
- R: Runs
- ER: Earned Runs
- BB: Walks
- SO: Strike Outs
- W: Wins
- L: Losses
- ERA: Earned Run Average
