= Howard Ehmke =

American baseball player (1894–1959)

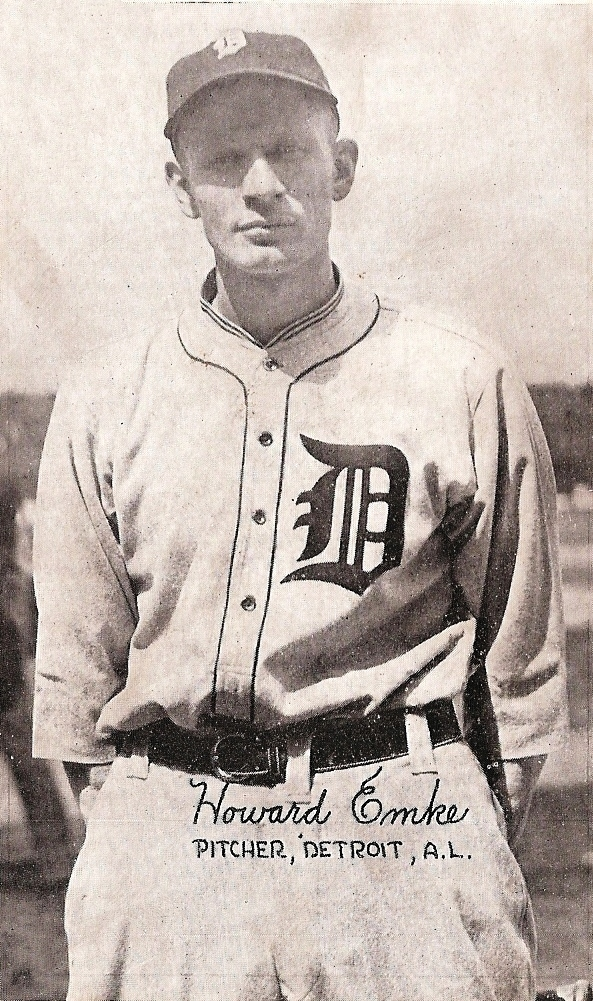
- Pitcher
- Born: April 24, 1894; Silver Creek, New York, U.S.
- Died: March 17, 1959 (aged 64); Philadelphia, Pennsylvania, U.S.
- Batted: Right Threw: Right

MLB debut
- April 12, 1915, for the Buffalo Blues

Last MLB appearance
- May 22, 1930, for the Philadelphia Athletics

MLB statistics
- Win–loss record: 166–166
- Earned run average: 3.75
- Strikeouts: 1,030
- Stats at Baseball Reference

Teams
- Buffalo Blues (1915); Detroit Tigers (1916–1922); Boston Red Sox (1923–1926); Philadelphia Athletics (1926–1930)

Career highlights and awards
- World Series champion (1929); Pitched a no-hitter on September 7, 1923

Howard John Ehmke (April 24, 1894 – March 17, 1959) was an American professional baseball pitcher. He played 16 years from 1914 to 1930, including 15 seasons in Major League Baseball for the Buffalo Blues (1915), Detroit Tigers (1916–1917, 1919–1922), Boston Red Sox (1923–1926), and Philadelphia Athletics (1926–1930).

Ehmke compiled a career win–loss record of 166–166 with a 3.75 earned run average (ERA). His greatest success was with the Red Sox, including a no-hitter and his only 20-win season in 1923. Ehmke still holds the American League record for fewest hits allowed (one) in two consecutive starts. Ehmke also ranks sixteenth all-time in hitting batters. He hit 137 batters in his career and led the American League in the category five times, including a career-high 23 in 1922. Ehmke is best known for being the surprise starter who won Game 1 of the 1929 World Series for the Athletics at the age of 35.

Before retiring from baseball, he started his own company that began making tarpaulins to cover baseball diamonds during rain.

== Early years ==
Ehmke was born in Silver Creek, New York, in 1894. He was the ninth of eleven children born to a German immigrant father and a Swedish-American mother. He pitched for his high school baseball team in Silver Creek when they won the Chautauqua County championship in 1912. He moved to Southern California in 1913 and attended Glendale High School for a year.

== Professional baseball ==
=== Minor Leagues and Buffalo Blues ===
Ehmke began his professional baseball career in 1914 with the Los Angeles Angels in the Pacific Coast League. In May and June 1914, he put together a streak of eight consecutive victories and became the "phenom" of the PCL, described as "the best looking prospect, in the pitching sense, that the Pacific Coast league ever has possessed." He appeared in a total of 40 games for the Angels and compiled a 12–11 record with a 2.79 earned run average (ERA).

A bidding war developed among major league teams seeking Ehmke's services. The Pittsburgh Pirates offered the Angels $5,000 in June 1914. In July 1914, the Kansas City Packers of the Federal League entered the bidding process. The Washington Senators purchased Ehmke from the Angels, but Ehmke refused to sign the contract presented to him by the Senators. On February 13, 1915, he finally signed a contract with the Buffalo Blues of the Federal League. He made his major league debut on April 12, 1915, and appeared in 18 games, only two as a starter, for Buffalo. He compiled an 0–2 record with a 5.53 ERA in 53 2/3 innings pitched.

The Federal League folded at the end of the 1915 season, and in May 1916, Ehmke joined the Syracuse Stars of the New York State League. Ehmke appeared in 38 games for Syracuse in 1916 and compiled a 31–7 record with a 1.55 ERA.

=== Detroit Tigers ===
On July 28, 1916, Ehmke was sold by Syracuse to the Detroit Tigers for a price reported to be "the biggest sum ever paid for a pitcher in the State League." He did not appear in his first game for the Tigers until September 1916. He appeared in a total of five games for the 1916 Tigers in a short tryout and compiled a 3–1 record with a 3.13 ERA.

In 1917, Ehmke appeared in 35 games, 25 as a starter, and compiled a 10–15 record with a 2.97 ERA. In late July 1917, sportswriter Paul Purman wrote that Ehmke had "bewildering speed, a wizardly assortment of curves and a change of pace which kept the batters off their balance." However, Purman noted that Ehmke weakened after seven innings, compiling a 1.60 ERA in the first seven innings and 9.00 in the eighth and ninth innings.

Ehmke missed the 1918 season due to wartime service in the United States Navy. He was stationed at a submarine base on the West Coast of the United States.

Ehmke's best season for the Tigers was 1919 when he finished with a 17–10 record. Ehmke did not have a winning season in Detroit after 1919 and was twice among the American League leaders in losses for the Tigers (18 in 1920 and 17 in 1922). In 1921, Ehmke had a record of 13–14 and an ERA of 4.54 pitching for a team that had the highest team batting average (.316) in American League history.

On August 8, 1920, Ehmke struck out eight batters and shut out the Yankees, 1–0, in just one hour, thirteen minutes‚ one of the shortest games in American League history. With no outs and two on in the fifth inning‚ Yankee Ping Bodie fell for the hidden ball trick applied by Tigers' second baseman Ralph Young. Ehmke did have problems with control during his tenure with the Tigers, leading the American League in batters hit by a pitch five times (1921–1923, 1925 and 1927) and was among the top three in bases on balls four times (1919, 1920, 1922, 1923).

=== Boston Red Sox ===
Ehmke with Yankees pitcher Bob Shawkey at Yankee Stadium on April 18, 1923

On November 18, 1922, the Tigers traded Ehmke with Babe Herman and Carl Holling to the Boston Red Sox for Del Pratt and Rip Collins. Ehmke flourished in Boston, winning 20 games in 1923. On September 7 of that year, he no-hit his future team, the Philadelphia Athletics, 4–0, at Shibe Park; not until Mel Parnell in 1956 would another Red Sox pitch a no-hitter. In that game, Slim Harriss hit a ball to the wall for a double, but was called out for missing first base, preserving the no-hitter. He followed the performance up with a one-hitter against the Yankees four days later, with the only hit in that game a ground ball that bounced off the third baseman's chest. He still holds the American League record for fewest hits allowed (one) in two consecutive games (Johnny Vander Meer's consecutive no-hitters in 1938 is the Major League record). His 1923 season was the best of his career. That year, he was 11th in the American League Most Valuable Player voting and led the league's pitchers with a 6.3 wins above replacement (WAR) rating. He also ranked among the league leaders with 20 wins (fourth), 121 strikeouts (fourth), 316 2/3 innings pitched (second), 39 games started (second), and 28 complete games (second).

Ehmke followed with another strong performance in 1924, finishing among the league leaders in wins (fifth best with 19), ERA (fourth best with 3.46), strikeouts (second best with 119), and innings pitched (first with 315). Ehmke finished 15th in the American League Most Valuable Player voting for 1924 and again led the league's pitchers with an 8.3 WAR rating.

In 1925, Ehmke had a record of 9–20. Ehmke lost 20 games despite pitching a league high 22 complete games, ranking third in the league in strikeouts, and having a 3.73 ERA, best among Boston's starters. The Red Sox were a poor team in 1925, losing 105 games. Ehmke finished 24th in the AL MVP voting despite losing 20 games.

=== Philadelphia Athletics ===
The 1929 Philadelphia Athletics, with Ehmke in the middle row

On June 15, 1926, the Red Sox traded Ehmke to the Philadelphia Athletics in exchange for Fred Heimach, Slim Harriss, and Baby Doll Jacobson. The change of scene did wonders for Ehmke. After going 3–10 with a 5.46 ERA in the first half of 1926 with the last place Red Sox, Ehmke went 12–4 with a 2.81 ERA in the second half of the season with Hall of Famer Mickey Cochrane catching and A's slugger, Al Simmons, hitting .341 behind him. Though the frequency of his starts diminished after 1927, Ehmke had a winning record for the Athletics in four consecutive seasons from 1926 to 1929.

By 1929, however, Ehmke was nearing the end of his career. He appeared in 11 games, eight as a starter, and was out for three weeks due to a sore arm. He finished the 1929 season with a 7–2 record and a 3.29 ERA, below the league average. In August, manager Connie Mack called Ehmke into his office and told him that he would be released after the season. Ehmke accepted the decision, but told Mack that he believed he had one more game left in him. After 15 years in the majors, he badly wanted to pitch in a World Series. By this time, it was clear that the A's would win the pennant. They had been in first since May 13, and had opened up a 12-game lead in the standings. After giving it some thought, Mack told Ehmke that after his next start, he wouldn't pitch again for the last month of the season. He also told Ehmke to scout the Chicago Cubs, who were running away with the National League, on their last East Coast trip of the season—and be ready to pitch Game 1 of the World Series.

Although it was widely thought to be a sentimental move, Mack believed that Ehmke's sidearm style and his mix of control and slow pitches would keep the predominantly right-handed Cubs off balance. He also believed that, with a month's rest, Ehmke's arm would hold up well. In Game 1, Ehmke pitched a complete game and struck out a then-World Series record 13 batters in a 3–1 win over Chicago. For this reason, Bill James called Mack's decision to start Ehmke "the most brilliant managerial stratagem in the history of baseball." At the time, Ehmke also set a record for lowest win total during the regular season by a World Series Game 1 starter. This record stood until 2006 when St. Louis Cardinals pitcher Anthony Reyes started Game 1 of the 2006 World Series after having gone 5–8 during the regular season. Ehmke also started the final game of the 1929 World Series, holding the Cubs scoreless in the first two innings, but giving up two runs with two outs in the third inning. The A's came from behind to win the game and the World Series.

Ehmke was brought back for the 1930 season, but was released on May 31, 1930, after appearing in three games with an 11.70 ERA. He appeared in his last game on May 22, 1930. Connie Mack said at the time, "I think his arm is gone. ... I am sorry to have to let Ehmke go, because he is a fine character, but I have to make room for an extra man who will be of more use to us."

== Tarpaulin business ==
By 1925, Ehmke had developed a large canvas tarpaulin product that could cover baseball and football fields when it rained. Credited as the inventor of the tarpaulin, he formed a company called Howard Ehmke Company to manufacture them, making his first sale in 1925 to the Pittsburgh Pirates for use at Forbes Field. He also made sales in 1926 to the University of Pennsylvania for Franklin Field and to the operators of a stadium in Chicago and took orders from three more baseball teams and the University of Michigan for Michigan Stadium. He had a plant in Detroit, and later Philadelphia, where he manufactured the tarpaulins, later expanding his business to tents, flags, and banners in the 1930s, and into defense work, including canvas covers for naval guns, during World War II. Ehmke Manufacturing Company is still in business today with its operations based in Philadelphia.

== Personal life ==
Ehmke married Marguerite Poindexter in approximately 1920. They had no children and lived in Philadelphia after retiring from baseball. Ehmke died at age 64 in a Philadelphia hospital in 1959. In February 1944, approaching his 50th birthday and during a time when hundreds of Major League Baseball players were serving in the military, Ehmke claimed he and other old-time players would return to the game rather than see it fold up for the duration of the war.

== See also ==
- List of Major League Baseball career hit batsmen leaders
- List of Major League Baseball no-hitters

Preceded by Sad Sam Jones	No-hitter pitcher September 7, 1923	Succeeded by Jesse Haines
