= Carl Holling =

American baseball player (1896–1962)

- Pitcher
- Born: July 9, 1896; Dixon, California, U.S.
- Died: July 18, 1962 (aged 66); Santa Rosa, California, U.S.
- Batted: Right Threw: Right

MLB debut
- April 19, 1921, for the Detroit Tigers

Last MLB appearance
- September 21, 1922, for the Detroit Tigers

MLB statistics
- Win–loss record: 4–8
- Earned run average: 5.02
- Strikeouts: 40
- Stats at Baseball Reference

Teams
- Detroit Tigers (1921–1922)

Carl Theodore Holling (July 9, 1896 – July 18, 1962) was an American pitcher in Major League Baseball who played for the Detroit Tigers from 1921 to 1922. Listed at 6'1", 172 lb., Holling batted and threw right-handed. He was born in Dixon, California.

In a two-season career, Holling posted a 4–8 record with 40 strikeouts and a 5.02 earned run average in 40 appearances, including 12 starts, four complete games, four saves, and 145 innings pitched.

Holling died in Santa Rosa, California, aged 66.
