= 1923 Detroit Tigers season =

Major League Baseball season

1923 Detroit Tigers
- League: American League
- Ballpark: Navin Field
- City: Detroit, Michigan
- Record: 83–71 (.539)
- League place: 2nd
- Owners: Frank Navin
- Managers: Ty Cobb

The 1923 Detroit Tigers season was a season in American baseball. The team finished second in the American League with a record of 83–71, 16 games behind the New York Yankees.

== Regular season ==
=== Season standings ===
American League
Team	W	L	Pct.	GB	Home	Road
New York Yankees	98	54	.645	—	46‍–‍30	52‍–‍24
Detroit Tigers	83	71	.539	16	45‍–‍32	38‍–‍39
Cleveland Indians	82	71	.536	16½	42‍–‍36	40‍–‍35
Washington Senators	75	78	.490	23½	43‍–‍34	32‍–‍44
St. Louis Browns	74	78	.487	24	40‍–‍36	34‍–‍42
Philadelphia Athletics	69	83	.454	29	34‍–‍41	35‍–‍42
Chicago White Sox	69	85	.448	30	30‍–‍45	39‍–‍40
Boston Red Sox	61	91	.401	37	37‍–‍40	24‍–‍51

=== Record vs. opponents ===
1923 American League record Sources:
Team	BOS	CWS	CLE	DET	NYY	PHA	SLB	WSH
Boston	—	9–13	10–12	10–12–1	8–14	13–7	4–18–1	7–15
Chicago	13–9	—	9–13	9–13	7–15	10–12	11–11–1	10–12–1
Cleveland	12–10	13–9	—	9–13	12–10	12–10	14–8	10–11
Detroit	12–10–1	13–9	13–9	—	10–12	12–10	12–10	11–11
New York	14–8	15–7	10–12	12–10	—	16–6	15–5	16–6
Philadelphia	7–13	12–10	10–12	10–12	6–16	—	9–13	15–7–1
St. Louis	18–4–1	11–11–1	8–14	10–12	5–15	13–9	—	9–13
Washington	15–7	12–10–1	11–10	11–11	6–16	7–15–1	13–9	—

=== Roster ===
1923 Detroit Tigers
Roster
Pitchers: Rufe Clarke; Bert Cole; Rip Collins; Hooks Dauss; Ray Francis; Ken Holloway; Syl Johnson; Roy Moore; Ole Olsen; Herman Pillette; Ed Wells; Earl Whitehill	Catchers: Johnny Bassler; Fred Carisch; Clyde Manion; Larry Woodall; Infielders: Lu Blue; Les Burke; George Cutshaw; Fred Haney; Bob Jones; John Kerr; Del Pratt; Topper Rigney	Outfielders: Ty Cobb; Bob Fothergill; Harry Heilmann; Heinie Manush; Bobby Veach; Other batters: Ira Flagstead	Manager: Ty Cobb; Coaches: Fred Carisch

== Player stats ==
=== Batting ===
==== Starters by position ====
Note: Pos = Position; G = Games played; AB = At bats; H = Hits; Avg. = Batting average; HR = Home runs; RBI = Runs batted in

Pos	Player	G	AB	H	Avg.	HR	RBI
C	Johnny Bassler	135	383	114	.298	0	49
1B	Lu Blue	129	504	143	.284	1	46
2B	Fred Haney	142	503	142	.282	4	67
SS	Topper Rigney	129	470	148	.315	1	74
3B	Bob Jones	100	372	93	.250	1	40
OF	Harry Heilmann	144	524	211	.403	18	115
OF	Ty Cobb	145	556	189	.340	6	88
OF	Bobby Veach	114	293	94	.321	2	39

==== Other batters ====
Note: G = Games played; AB = At bats; H = Hits; Avg. = Batting average; HR = Home runs; RBI = Runs batted in

Player	G	AB	H	Avg.	HR	RBI
Heinie Manush	109	308	103	.334	4	54
Del Pratt	101	297	92	.310	0	40
Bob Fothergill	101	241	76	.315	1	49
Larry Woodall	71	148	41	.277	1	19
George Cutshaw	45	143	32	.224	0	13
John Kerr	19	42	9	.214	0	1
Clyde Manion	23	22	3	.136	0	2
Les Burke	7	10	1	.100	0	2
Ira Flagstead	1	1	0	.000	0	0
Fred Carisch	2	0	0	----	0	0

=== Pitching ===
==== Starting pitchers ====
Note: G = Games pitched; IP = Innings pitched; W = Wins; L = Losses; ERA = Earned run average; SO = Strikeouts

Player	G	IP	W	L	ERA	SO
Hooks Dauss	50	316.0	21	13	3.62	105
Herman Pillette	47	250.1	14	19	3.85	64
Rip Collins	17	92.1	3	7	4.87	25

==== Other pitchers ====
Note: G = Games pitched; IP = Innings pitched; W = Wins; L = Losses; ERA = Earned run average; SO = Strikeouts

Player	G	IP	W	L	ERA	SO
Ken Holloway	42	194.0	11	10	4.45	55
Syl Johnson	37	176.1	12	7	3.98	93
Bert Cole	52	163.0	13	5	4.14	32
Ray Francis	33	79.1	5	8	4.42	27
Earl Whitehill	8	33.0	2	0	2.73	19

==== Relief pitchers ====
Note: G = Games pitched; W = Wins; L = Losses; SV = Saves; ERA = Earned run average; SO = Strikeouts

Player	G	W	L	SV	ERA	SO
Ole Olsen	17	1	1	0	6.31	12
Ed Wells	7	0	0	0	5.40	6
Rufe Clarke	5	1	1	0	4.50	2
Roy Moore	3	0	0	1	3.00	7

== Farm system ==
Level	Team	League	Manager
A	Fort Worth Panthers	Texas League	Jake Atz

LEAGUE CHAMPIONS: Fort Worth
