= 1924 Detroit Tigers season =

Major League Baseball season

1924 Detroit Tigers
- League: American League
- Ballpark: Navin Field
- City: Detroit, Michigan
- Record: 86–68 (.558)
- League place: 3rd
- Owners: Frank Navin
- Managers: Ty Cobb

Photograph of Detroit Tigers pitcher Bert Cole in the Detroit Free Press, May 31, 1924.

The 1924 Detroit Tigers season was a season in American baseball. The team finished third in the American League with a record of 86–68, 6 games behind the Washington Senators.

== Regular season ==
=== Season standings ===
American League
Team	W	L	Pct.	GB	Home	Road
Washington Senators	92	62	.597	—	47‍–‍30	45‍–‍32
New York Yankees	89	63	.586	2	45‍–‍32	44‍–‍31
Detroit Tigers	86	68	.558	6	45‍–‍33	41‍–‍35
St. Louis Browns	74	78	.487	17	41‍–‍36	33‍–‍42
Philadelphia Athletics	71	81	.467	20	36‍–‍39	35‍–‍42
Cleveland Indians	67	86	.438	24½	37‍–‍38	30‍–‍48
Boston Red Sox	67	87	.435	25	41‍–‍36	26‍–‍51
Chicago White Sox	66	87	.431	25½	37‍–‍39	29‍–‍48

=== Record vs. opponents ===
1924 American League record Sources:
Team	BOS	CWS	CLE	DET	NYY	PHA	SLB	WSH
Boston	—	10–12	14–8	6–16	5–17–1	12–10	11–11–1	9–13–1
Chicago	12–10	—	11–11	8–14–1	6–16	11–11	13–8	5–17
Cleveland	8–14	11–11	—	7–15	8–14	11–11	11–10	11–11
Detroit	16–6	14–8–1	15–7	—	13–9	11–11	9–13	8–14–1
New York	17–5–1	16–6	14–8	9–13	—	12–8	12–10	9–13
Philadelphia	10–12	11–11	11–11	11–11	8–12	—	13–9	7–15
St. Louis	11–11–1	8–13	10–11	13–9	10–12	9–13	—	13–9
Washington	13–9–1	17–5	11–11	14–8–1	13–9	15–7	9–13	—

=== Roster ===
1924 Detroit Tigers
Roster
Pitchers: Rufe Clarke; Bert Cole; Rip Collins; Hooks Dauss; Ken Holloway; Syl Johnson; Ken Jones; Dutch Leonard; Willie Ludolph; Herman Pillette; Lil Stoner; Ed Wells; Earl Whitehill	Catchers: Johnny Bassler; Clyde Manion; Larry Woodall; Infielders: Lu Blue; Les Burke; Charlie Gehringer; Fred Haney; Bob Jones; John Kerr; Frank O'Rourke; Del Pratt; Topper Rigney	Outfielders: Ty Cobb; Bob Fothergill; Harry Heilmann; Heinie Manush; Al Wingo	Manager: Ty Cobb; Coaches: Fred Carisch

== Player stats ==
=== Batting ===
==== Starters by position ====
Note: Pos = Position; G = Games played; AB = At bats; H = Hits; Avg. = Batting average; HR = Home runs; RBI = Runs batted in

Pos	Player	G	AB	H	Avg.	HR	RBI
C	Johnny Bassler	124	379	131	.346	1	68
1B	Lu Blue	108	395	123	.311	2	53
2B	Del Pratt	121	429	130	.303	1	77
SS	Topper Rigney	147	499	144	.289	4	94
3B	Bob Jones	110	393	107	.272	0	47
OF	Harry Heilmann	153	570	197	.346	10	114
OF	Heinie Manush	120	422	122	.289	9	68
OF	Ty Cobb	155	625	211	.338	4	78

==== Other batters ====
Note: G = Games played; AB = At bats; H = Hits; Avg. = Batting average; HR = Home runs; RBI = Runs batted in

Player	G	AB	H	Avg.	HR	RBI
Fred Haney	86	256	79	.309	1	30
Les Burke	72	241	61	.253	0	17
Frank O'Rourke	47	181	50	.276	0	19
Bob Fothergill	54	166	50	.301	0	15
Larry Woodall	67	165	51	.309	0	25
Al Wingo	78	150	43	.287	1	26
Clyde Manion	14	13	3	.231	0	2
Charlie Gehringer	5	13	6	.462	0	1
John Kerr	17	11	3	.273	0	1

=== Pitching ===
==== Starting pitchers ====
Note: G = Games pitched; IP = Innings pitched; W = Wins; L = Losses; ERA = Earned run average; SO = Strikeouts

Player	G	IP	W	L	ERA	SO
Earl Whitehill	35	233.0	17	9	3.86	65
Rip Collins	34	216.0	14	7	3.21	75
Lil Stoner	36	215.2	11	11	4.72	66
Dutch Leonard	9	51.1	3	3	4.56	26

==== Other pitchers ====
Note: G = Games pitched; IP = Innings pitched; W = Wins; L = Losses; ERA = Earned run average; SO = Strikeouts

Player	G	IP	W	L	ERA	SO
Ken Holloway	49	181.1	14	6	4.07	46
Hooks Dauss	40	131.1	12	11	4.59	44
Bert Cole	28	109.1	3	9	4.69	16
Syl Johnson	29	104.0	5	4	4.93	55
Ed Wells	29	102.0	6	8	4.06	33

==== Relief pitchers ====
Note: G = Games pitched; W = Wins; L = Losses; SV = Saves; ERA = Earned run average; SO = Strikeouts

Player	G	W	L	SV	ERA	SO
Herman Pillette	19	1	1	1	4.78	13
Willie Ludolph	3	0	0	0	4.76	1
Rufe Clarke	2	0	0	0	3.38	1
Ken Jones	1	0	0	0	0.00	0

== Farm system ==
Level	Team	League	Manager
A	Fort Worth Panthers	Texas League	Jake Atz

LEAGUE CHAMPIONS: Fort Worth
