= Johnny Bassler =

American baseball player (1895–1979)

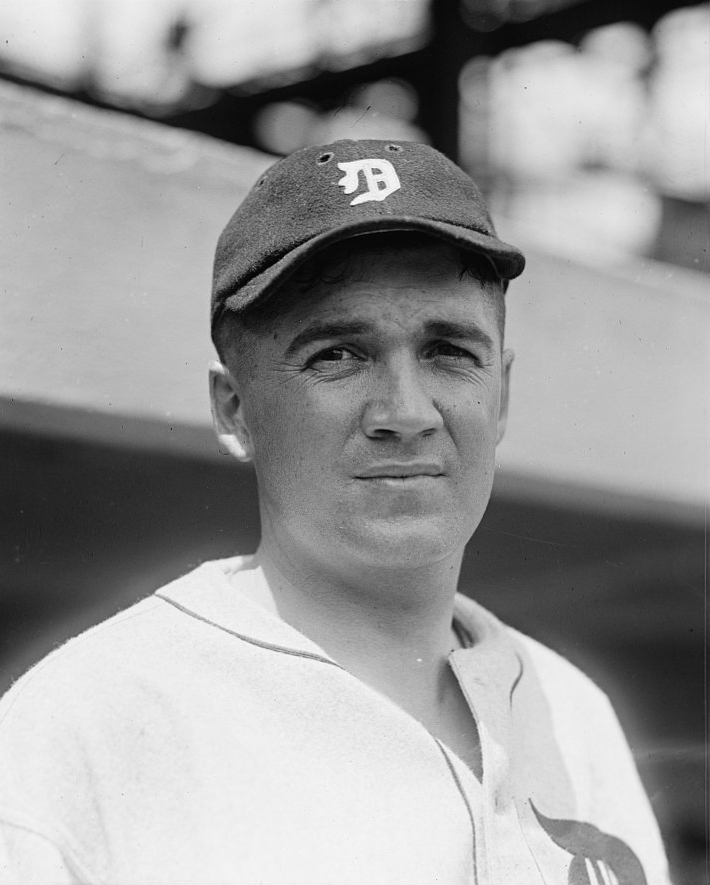
- Bassler in 1924
- Catcher
- Born: June 3, 1895; Mechanics Grove, Pennsylvania, U.S.
- Died: June 29, 1979 (aged 84); Santa Monica, California, U.S.
- Batted: Left Threw: Right

MLB debut
- July 11, 1913, for the Cleveland Naps

Last MLB appearance
- September 30, 1927, for the Detroit Tigers

MLB statistics
- Batting average: .304
- Home runs: 1
- Runs batted in: 319
- Stats at Baseball Reference

Teams
- Cleveland Naps (1913–1914); Detroit Tigers (1921–1927)

John Landis Bassler (June 3, 1895 – June 29, 1979) was an American professional baseball player and coach. He played as a catcher in professional baseball for 26 seasons between 1911 and 1937, including nine seasons in Major League Baseball with the Cleveland Naps in 1913 and 1914 and the Detroit Tigers from 1921 to 1927. Bassler was one of the 1920s Tigers who benefited from the hitting instruction of Ty Cobb.

Bassler had a career batting average of .304 and an on-base percentage of .416 in his nine major league seasons. His on-base percentage ranks as the second highest in major league history for a catcher. His .346 batting average in 1924 was the highest by a catcher to that point in American League history and one of the highest by any major league catcher since 1912 (Joe Mauer in 2009 hit .365) He finished in the top seven in the voting for the American League Most Valuable Player award three straight years: sixth in 1922, seventh in 1923, and fifth in 1924. Baseball historian, Bill James, ranked Bassler 47th all-time among major league catchers in his book, The Bill James Historical Baseball Abstract.

Bassler also played 15 seasons in the Pacific Coast League (PCL) with the Los Angeles Angels (1915–1917, 1919), Seattle Rainiers (1920), Hollywood Stars (1928–1935), and Seattle Indians (1936–1937). He appeared in 1,525 games in the PCL, compiling a .321 batting average in those games. In 1943, he was one of the inaugural inductees into the Pacific Coast League Hall of Fame. After his playing career ended, Bassler lived in Southern California.

== Early life ==
Bassler was born in 1895 in Mechanics Grove, Pennsylvania. He was one of 13 children born to a Mennonite family in Lancaster, Pennsylvania. His father Jacob Bassler (born 1866) was a Pennsylvania native who worked in a paper mill in 1900 and as a motorman on a street car in 1910. His mother Fianna Bassler (born 1868) was also a Pennsylvania native. By 1920, Bassler's family had moved to 2434 Bundy Drive in West Los Angeles, where his father was working as a motorman for the electric railroad.

== Professional baseball ==
=== Minor leagues ===
Bassler began playing professional baseball in 1911 at age 15 for Sunbury in the Susquehanna League. He next played in 1912 for the York White Roses in the Tri-State League.

=== Cleveland Naps ===
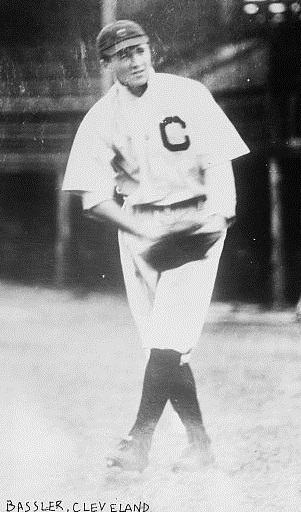
Johnny Bassler, 1913

After completing the 1912 season in the Tri-State League, Bassler traveled to California to play winter league baseball. There he played on the same team as Cleveland Naps shortstop, Ivy Olson. Olson persuaded Bassler to join the Naps for spring training camp in 1913. Bassler made his major league debut for the Cleveland Naps on July 11, 1913, one month after his 18th birthday. He appeared in only one game for the Naps in 1913 – going hitless in two plate appearances and committing an error. In 1914, Bassler played in 43 games, 18 as the Naps' starting catcher. Though he compiled a .182 batting average he drew 15 bases on balls in 94 plate appearances to boost his on-base percentage to .323.

=== Pacific Coast League ===
Bassler returned to West Coast and played for the Los Angeles Angels of the Pacific Coast League from 1915 to 1917 and again in 1919. He missed the 1918 season due to military service during the United States' participation in World War I.

=== Detroit Tigers ===
==== 1921 season ====
In January 1921, the Los Angeles Angels traded Bassler to the Detroit Tigers for Oscar Stanage, two infielders, and a pitcher. The Tigers made the deal on the recommendation of Ty Cobb. Bassler played for the Tigers for seven years.

In 1921, his first season with the Tigers, Bassler appeared in 119 games, including 111 as the team's starting catcher. He compiled a .307 batting average. He also drew 58 bases on balls for a .401 on-base percentage. He also ranked among the American League's leading catchers with a 5.11 range factor rating per nine innings (first), 433 putouts (fifth), 113 assists (fourth), and a .975 fielding percentage (fifth). After the 1921 season, Cobb opined that Bassler was smart, diagnosed plays quickly, and had a good arm, and predicted that Bassler would be the premier catcher in the American League in 1922.

The entire Detroit lineup hit remarkably well in 1921. Harry Heilmann and Ty Cobb finished first and second in batting average, and the team finished the season with a batting average of .316, the highest in American League history and second highest in major league history. However, true to the baseball adage that good pitching beats good hitting, the 1921 Tigers lacked good pitching and finished in sixth place, 27 games behind the pennant-winning Yankees.

==== 1922 season ====
In 1922, Basser appeared in 121 games, 113 as the Tigers' starting catcher. He compiled a .323 batting average, and his .422 on-base percentage was seventh best in the American League. He also ranked among the league leaders with a 31.0 at bats to strikeout ratio (eighth). Defensively, he continued to rank among the league's leading catchers with 12 double plays turned (fourth), a 4.53 range factor rating per game, 113 assists (fifth), and a .980 fielding percentage (fifth). However, he also led the league with 73 stolen bases allowed and ranked third with 11 errors. He ranked sixth in the voting for the 1922 American League Most Valuable Player award.

==== 1923 season ====
In 1923, Bassler appeared in a career-high 135 games, 121 as the starting catcher, and compiled a .298 batting average. Offensively, he ranked among the American League leaders with a .414 on-base percentage (eighth), 76 bases on balls (ninth), and 29.5 at bats per strikeout. Defensively, he led the league's catchers with 84 runners caught stealing and a 59.6% success rating in catching base runners trying to steal a base. He ranked second in the league with a .988 fielding percentage and 133 assists and ranked fifth with a career-high 447 putouts. He ranked seventh in the voting for the 1923 American League Most Valuable Player award. Between the 1923 and 1924 seasons, Harry Bullion of the Detroit Free Press wrote that Bassler, like Cobb, was a student of the game.

During the 1923 season, Bassler was part of one of the great trick plays in baseball history. When Babe Ruth came to bat, player-manager Ty Cobb whistled a signal to Bassler and pitcher Hooks Dauss from center field, directing them to give Ruth an intentional walk. When Dauss threw a strike past Ruth, Cobb ran to the infield, yelling at Dauss and Bassler for disobeying his order. When Dauss then threw a second strike past Ruth, Cobb raced in again, stomped around and pulled both Dauss and Bassler from the game. After warming up, the relief pitcher fired a third strike past an unsuspecting Ruth. Cobb reportedly doubled up in laughter, calling it a "once in a lifetime setup play."

==== 1924 season ====
Bassler had his best season in 1924. In his fourth season as the Tigers' starting catcher, he appeared in 122 games, including 116 as a starter at catcher. He compiled a career-high .346 batting average that was the fifth highest in the American League and a .441 on-base percentage that was the second highest in the league trailing only Babe Ruth. Bassler's .346 batting average in 1924 was the highest by a catcher to that point in American League history. It was also the highest by any major league catcher since Chief Meyers hit .358 in 1912. Playing at a position where the emphasis was on defense rather than offense, Bassler was the leading batter on a 1924 Detroit team that included four Hall of Famers and American League batting champions: Ty Cobb (12 batting titles), Harry Heilmann (four batting titles), Heinie Manush (1926 batting title), and Charlie Gehringer (1937 batting title). He also had another strong defensive season, ranking among the league's leading catchers with 103 assists (third), 11 double plays turned (third), a .979 fielding percentage (fourth), and 402 putouts (fifth). In the voting for the 1924 American League MVP, he finished fifth behind pitchers Walter Johnson and Herb Pennock, second baseman Eddie Collins, and outfielder Charlie Jamieson.

Bassler later credited his improved batting in 1924 to his teammate Bobby Veach. Bassler recalled:

"I was a dead left-field hitter and all a good pitcher had to do was shoot me a fast high ball, inside, and I'd pop up. I found Veach used a little fuller swing than I against this delivery, always keeping his wrist behind the point of contact with the ball. About the middle of 1924, after experimenting, I landed upon the combination of a big-handled bat of light Cuban wood and a full swing patterned after Veach. Then suddenly they began to line into right and center for me."

==== 1925–1927 ====
In 1925, Bassler remained the Tigers' primary catcher, but his batting average dropped 67 points from .346 to .279. In 1926, he shared the catcher position with Clyde Manion and Larry Woodall, with Bassler and Manion each starting 57 games and Woodall 41. He again shared the job with Woodall starting 70 games at catcher and Bassler starting 59 games. Bassler compiled batting averages of .305 and .285 in 1926 and 1927. He appeared in his final major league game on September 30, 1927, at age 32.

=== Career accomplishments ===
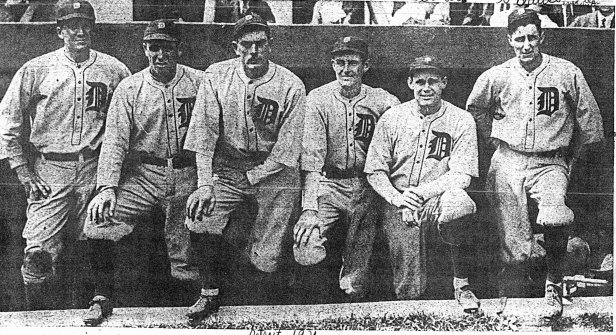
Detroit Tigers, 1921 (left to right): Johnny Bassler, Donie Bush, Bobby Veach, Bert Cole, Dutch Leonard, Hooks Dauss

Bassler was a capable player both on offense and defense. His notable career accomplishments include the following:

- Bassler finished in the top seven in the American League Most Valuable Player voting three straight years: sixth in 1922, seventh in 1923, and fifth in 1924.
- Bassler's .346 batting average in 1924 was the highest by a catcher to that point in American League history and the highest by any major league catcher since 1912. His 1924 average led a Detroit team that included Hall of Fame batsmen Cobb, Harry Heilmann, Heinie Manush, and a young Charlie Gehringer.
- Bassler compiled a .416 on-base percentage over the course of his career. He had an on-base percentage over .400 in all seven years with the Tigers. The only major league catcher with a higher career on-base percentage is Mickey Cochrane at .419. Bassler's 1924 on-base percentage of .441 was second behind Babe Ruth. His .420 on-base percentage in his years with the Tigers ranks second in franchise history, behind Ty Cobb.
- Bassler had a good batting eye. He walked 437 times in his major league career, while striking out only 81 times. That is a ratio of 5.4 walks per strikeout, the second highest in major league history behind only Joe Sewell.
- Bassler was also among the American League leaders in at bats per strikeout four straight years from 1922 to 1925. His 1925 total of 57.3 at bats per strikeout was a career high.

In The New Bill James Historical Baseball Abstract, released in 2001, baseball analyst Bill James rated Bassler as the 47th best catcher of all time. James wrote that, "if his major league career wasn't so short he would rank among the top 20 catchers of all time."

Bassler was also a solid defensive catcher in his years with the Detroit Tigers. In 1923, his .988 fielding percentage (eight errors in 128 games) was twelve points higher than the league average of .975. Bassler was known for his strong throwing arm. In his prime years from 1921 to 1925, Bassler had 462 assists in 482 games. In 1923, he had 133 assists in 128 games as a catcher. He also had 14 double plays in 118 games in 1925. The weakest area of Bassler's game was power. In 2,319 career at bats, Bassler hit one home run.

=== Return to the Pacific Coast League ===
In 1928, the Tigers sold the 32-year-old Bassler to the Hollywood Stars of the Pacific Coast League (PCL). Bassler played for the Stars from 1928 to 1935 and appeared in 867 games for the club. In 1930, he hit .365 and led the Stars to the PCL pennant. He hit .354 in 1931 and .336 in 1933. According to Bill James, "the PCL didn't record walks, but it would be a safe guess that he wasn't walking any less often." In his book, The Hollywood Stars, Richard E. Beverage wrote that Bassler was "one of the greatest catchers in minor league history."

On March 30, 1935, Bassler collapsed with what was originally reported to be a stomach hemorrhage while in the dugout during a spring game for the Stars against the Chicago Cubs. His diagnosis was later reported as a heart attack, and he announced his retirement from baseball in the summer of 1935.

Bassler made a comeback with the Seattle Indians of the PCL in 1936. He compiled a .354 batting average in 111 games and 260 at bats during the 1936 season. On May 25, 1937, he was hired as the manager of the Seattle club. He also appeared in 56 games as a player for Seattle in 1937, compiling a .313 batting average. Seattle team owner Bill Klepper had financial problems. On the last day of the 1937 season, pitcher Dick Barrett needed two victories to reach 20 and earn a $500 bonus. He beat Sacramento 4–1 in the first game of a doubleheader. Between games, federal and state tax agents seized the gate receipts for money due on admission taxes. Klepper told Bassler to pitch Marion Oppelt in the second game. Bassler started Barrett anyway. Barrett went all the way and got his 20th win, 11–2. The next morning, September 20, 1937, Klepper fired Bassler for insubordination.

In 15 seasons, Bassler appeared in 1,525 games in the PCL, compiled .321 batting average with 1,353 hits, 533 runs scored, and 198 doubles. In 1943, he was one of the inaugural inductees into the Pacific Coast League Hall of Fame.

=== Major league coach ===
On November 28, 1937, Bassler was hired as a coach and chief assistant to new Cleveland Indians manager Ossie Vitt, a former Detroit teammate of Bassler. Bassler remained with Cleveland from 1938 to 1940. He has been credited with helping Bob Feller, who had won no more than nine games in his first two major league seasons. In three years working with Bassler, Feller won 68 games and led the American League in wins and strikeouts in both 1939 and 1940.

During the 1940 season, Bassler was the second in command under Vitt. Vitt was a tough man to get along with and became embroiled in a player revolt by the 1940 team that became known as the "Cleveland Crybabies." In his autobiography, Feller wrote that the players decided to stop dealing with Vitt and work instead with Bassler. "We decided to go around Vitt. We worked with his coaches, mostly with his number two man, Johnny Bassler. We were doing what people in a lot of organizations with management problems do: ignore the top guy and work with the second in command."

On December 7, 1940, Bassler was hired as a coach for the St. Louis Browns and was given the responsibility of working with the pitchers. He was released by the Browns on June 6, 1941, after spending less than one season with the club.

== Family and later years ==
Bassler was married to Margaret Bassler. They had four children, Barbara (born c. 1922), Sally (born c. 1925), John (born c. 1929), and James (born 1933). During and after his playing career was over, Bassler lived in Santa Monica, California, and later in Malibu, California.

After retiring from baseball, and during the offseason during his years in baseball, Bassler spent much of his time hooking rugs. Bassler would take old silk stockings and dye them in pots on the stove. He would then cut them in strips and hook them into silk rugs. In the 1940s, Bassler bought 48 acres (190,000 m^{2}) in Latigo Canyon in Malibu for $75 an acre; he drove to the property on weekends and planted plants. He also built a house on the property, using discarded tile from a Malibu tile company and wood from the demolition of the Venice Pier. Bassler also collected materials from his job at the 20th Century Fox movie lot in Century City. According to his son, the studio job was "mainly to get building supplies." After a project, the sets would be torn down and burned. Bassler saw an opportunity to obtain materials from discarded sets to help build his house in Latigo Canyon. Bassler's son joked that their house went up bit by bit with pieces from Hollywood sets, including the front door from a Gene Tierney film Leave Her to Heaven, and the back of the house (in Chinese style) from Gregory Peck's The Keys of the Kingdom.

Bassler coached Bob Feller before Feller entered the military during World War II, and the two became friends. When Feller got out of the military, Bassler took him on a tour of the studio. Alfred Hitchcock knew of Feller and let him sit in on the shooting of the film Lifeboat.

Bassler died in 1979 in Santa Monica at age 84. He was buried at Woodlawn Cemetery in Santa Monica.

His youngest child, James Bassler, became a renowned weaver and fiber artist and a professor at the UCLA School of Arts and Architecture.
