= 1952 Baseball Hall of Fame balloting =

Elections to the Baseball Hall of Fame

National Baseball

Hall of Fame and Museum
- New inductees: 2
- via BBWAA: 2
- Total inductees: 62
- Induction date: July 21, 1952

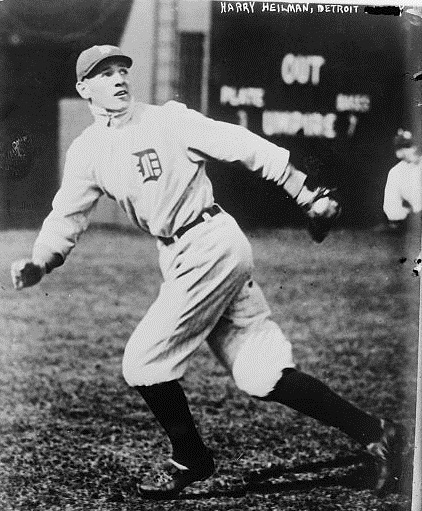
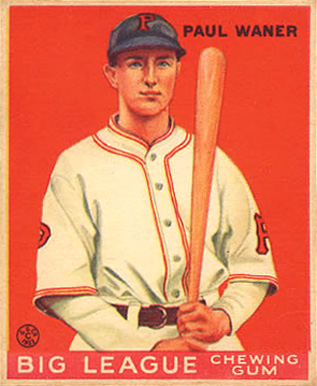
1952 inductees Harry Heilmann (left) and Paul Waner

Elections to the Baseball Hall of Fame for 1952 followed the same rules as 1951. The Baseball Writers' Association of America (BBWAA) voted once by mail to select from major league players retired less than 25 year and elected two, Harry Heilmann and Paul Waner. Meanwhile, the Old-Timers Committee, with jurisdiction over earlier players and other figures, did not meet. A formal induction ceremony was held in Cooperstown, New York, on July 21, 1952, with Commissioner of Baseball Ford Frick and National League president Warren Giles in attendance.

== BBWAA election ==
The 10-year members of the BBWAA had the authority to select any players active in 1927 or later, provided they had not been active in 1951. Voters were instructed to cast votes for 10 candidates; any candidate receiving votes on at least 75% of the ballots would be honored with induction to the Hall.

A total of 234 ballots were cast, with 2,186 individual votes for 75 specific candidates, an average of 9.34 per ballot; 176 votes were required for election. The two candidates who received at least 75% of the vote and were elected are indicated in bold italics.

Player	Votes	Percent	Change
**Harry Heilmann**	203	86.8	▲19.1%
**Paul Waner**	195	83.3	▲11.6%
Bill Terry	155	66.2	▲0.7%
Dizzy Dean	152	65.0	▲0.8%
Al Simmons	141	60.3	▲9.0%
Bill Dickey	139	59.4	▲7.2%
Rabbit Maranville	133	56.8	▲8.1%
Dazzy Vance	105	44.9	▲13.9%
Ted Lyons	101	43.2	▲11.8%
Gabby Hartnett	77	32.9	▲7.7%
Hank Greenberg	75	32.1	▲2.5%
Chief Bender	70	29.9	▲14.4%
Joe Cronin	48	20.5	▲1.0%
Ray Schalk	44	18.8	▲2.4%
Max Carey	36	15.4	▲3.5%
Hank Gowdy	34	14.5	▲3.0%
Ross Youngs	34	14.5	▼0.5%
Pepper Martin	31	13.2	▲4.8%
Zack Wheat	30	12.8	▲4.4%
Lefty Gomez	29	12.4	▲2.2%
Tony Lazzeri	29	12.4	▲0.5%
Casey Stengel	27	11.5	▲8.0%
Edd Roush	24	10.3	▲1.0%
Hack Wilson	21	9.0	▼0.3%
Chuck Klein	19	8.1	▲1.5%
Lefty O'Doul	19	8.1	▲2.3%
Bucky Harris	12	5.1	▲1.1%
Waite Hoyt	12	5.1	▼0.7%
Dave Bancroft	11	4.7	▲0.7%
Duffy Lewis	11	4.7	▲3.8%
Kiki Cuyler	10	4.3	▲0.8%
Mel Harder	10	4.3	▲3.9%
Steve O'Neill	10	4.3	▲3.0%
Red Ruffing	10	4.3	▲0.3%
Babe Adams	9	3.8	▼1.5%
Red Faber	9	3.8	▲0.3%
Burleigh Grimes	9	3.8	▲1.6%
Dickey Kerr	9	3.8	▲2.5%
Rube Marquard	9	3.8	▲2.5%
Jim Bottomley	7	3.0	▲0.3%
Jimmie Wilson	7	3.0	▲2.1%
Charlie Grimm	6	2.6	▼1.4%
Jimmy Dykes	5	2.1	▲0.8%
Tommy Henrich	4	1.7	-
Red Rolfe	4	1.7	▼1.0%
Everett Scott	4	1.7	▲0.8%
Cy Williams	4	1.7	▼1.4%
Babe Herman	3	1.3	▼0.9%
Art Nehf	3	1.3	▼0.5%
Eppa Rixey	3	1.3	▼0.9%
Bucky Walters	3	1.3	-
Earl Averill	2	0.9	-
Wilbur Cooper	2	0.9	▲0.5%
Al López	2	0.9	-
Dolf Luque	2	0.9	-
Roger Peckinpaugh	2	0.9	-
Eddie Rommel	2	0.9	▲0.5%
Lloyd Waner	2	0.9	▲0.5%
Ben Chapman	1	0.4	-
Earle Combs	1	0.4	-
Frankie Crosetti	1	0.4	-
Leo Durocher	1	0.4	-
Howard Ehmke	1	0.4	Steady
Mike González	1	0.4	-
Chick Hafey	1	0.4	Steady
Travis Jackson	1	0.4	▼1.4%
Bob Meusel	1	0.4	-
Clyde Milan	1	0.4	Steady
Hub Pruett	1	0.4	Steady
Sam Rice	1	0.4	Steady
Muddy Ruel	1	0.4	Steady
George Selkirk	1	0.4	▼0.5%
Billy Southworth	1	0.4	▼1.4%
Billy Werber	1	0.4	-
Glenn Wright	1	0.4	Steady

Key to colors
Elected to the Hall. These individuals are also indicated in **bold italics**.
Players who were elected in future elections. These individuals are also indicated in plain italics.

== Sources ==
- James, Bill (1994). The Politics of Glory: How Baseball's Hall of Fame Really Works. Macmillan. ISBN 0025107747. "Note: reissued in paperback as Whatever Happened to the Hall of Fame?"
