= Willie Ludolph =

American baseball player (1900–1952)

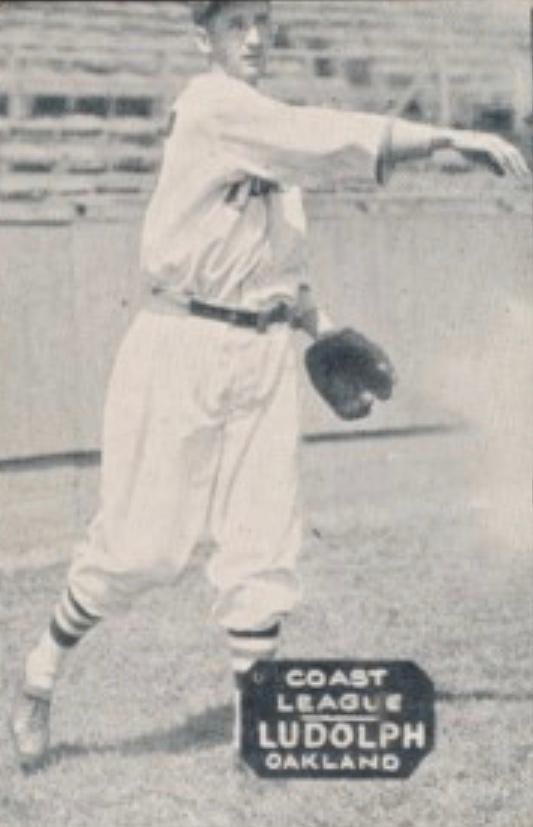
- Pitcher
- Born: January 21, 1900; San Francisco, California, U.S.
- Died: April 8, 1952 (aged 52); Oakland, California, U.S.
- Batted: Right Threw: Right

MLB debut
- May 28, 1924, for the Detroit Tigers

Last MLB appearance
- June 20, 1924, for the Detroit Tigers

MLB statistics
- Win–loss record: 0–0
- Earned run average: 4.76
- Strikeouts: 1
- Stats at Baseball Reference

Teams
- Detroit Tigers (1924)

William Francis Ludolph (January 21, 1900 – April 8, 1952), nicknamed "Wee Willie", was an American professional baseball player. He was a right-handed pitcher for one season (1924) with the Detroit Tigers. For his career, he recorded no decisions with a 4.76 earned run average, and 1 strikeout in 5 2/3 innings pitched.

An alumnus of St. Mary's College of California, he was born in San Francisco, California and died in Oakland, California at the age of 52.
