= Bob Fothergill =

American baseball player (1897–1938)

- Fothergill with the Detroit Tigers
- Outfielder
- Born: August 16, 1897; Massillon, Ohio, U.S.
- Died: March 20, 1938 (aged 40); Detroit, Michigan, U.S.
- Batted: Right Threw: Right

MLB debut
- August 18, 1922, for the Detroit Tigers

Last MLB appearance
- July 5, 1933, for the Boston Red Sox

MLB statistics
- Batting average: .325
- Home runs: 36
- Runs batted in: 582
- Stats at Baseball Reference

Teams
- Detroit Tigers (1922–1930); Chicago White Sox (1930–1932); Boston Red Sox (1933)

Robert Roy Fothergill (August 16, 1897 – March 20, 1938), often referred to by the nicknames "Fats" and "Fatty" because of his weight and "the People's Choice" due to his popularity with the fans, was an American professional baseball player. He played professional baseball, principally as a left fielder, for 14 years from 1920 to 1933, including 12 seasons in Major League Baseball with the Detroit Tigers (1922–1930), Chicago White Sox (1930–1932), and Boston Red Sox (1933). He compiled a .325 career batting average in the major leagues and was one of the best hitters in baseball in the late 1920s, batting .367 in 1926, .359 in 1927, and .354 in 1929. He also compiled 56 extra base hits and 114 RBIs in 1927.

== Early life ==
Fothergill was born in Massillon, Ohio, in 1897. His father was a fireman in a rolling mill who died from tetanus when Fothergill was four years old. Fothergill had only a grade school education, and played with the Massillon Tigers and Canton Bulldogs in the early years of professional American football. He began playing semi-pro baseball in 1918 and 1919 with the Massillon Agathons. At the time of the 1920 U.S. census, he was employed as a blacksmith.

== Professional baseball ==
=== Minor leagues ===
Fothergill began playing professional baseball with the Bloomington Bloomers of the Illinois–Indiana–Iowa League (Three-Eye League) in 1920, compiling a .332 batting average and .482 slugging percentage. In July 1920, with Fothergill leading the Three-Eye League in batting in his first year of professional ball, the Bloomers opened a bidding war among the major league teams for Fothergill's services. On July 17, Fothergill was sold to the Detroit Tigers as the high bidder, subject to the caveat that he would not be required to report until the Bloomers' season was over in September 1920.

Fothergill reported to the Tigers for spring training in 1921 and performed well, but there was no room for him in an outfield that included Ty Cobb, Harry Heilmann and Bobby Veach. Accordingly, he was released in early April 1921. He spent the 1921 season with the Rochester Colts, leading the team to an International League pennant, and compiling a .338 batting average and .538 slugging percentage. While with Rochester, Fothergill became "a big drawing" card who turned handsprings when he beat out a ground ball at first base. One newspaper account noted, "No one in the minors hit the ball harder [in 1921] than Fothergill."

=== Detroit Tigers ===
In 1922, Fothergill again reported to spring training with the Detroit Tigers and was criticized for being overweight. He remained with the Tigers at the start of the 1922 season. He appeared in 42 games and compiled a .322 batting average, but was sold back to Rochester in late May. He appeared in 101 games for Rochester in 1922 and compiled a .383 batting average and .562 slugging percentage. He was the leading batter in the International League in 1922.

In 1923, Fothergill returned to the Tigers, but was again unable to break into the starting lineup, with Cobb, Heilmann and Veach holding onto their spots in the Detroit outfield and rookie outfielder Heinie Manush batting .334. Fothergill appeared in 101 games, 59 in left field, and compiled a .315 batting average.

Fothergill's playing time was reduced further in 1924, as Manush took over as the team's regular left fielder. Fothergill appeared in 54 games, 34 of them in left field, and compiled a .301 batting average. In 1925, another outfielder, Al Wingo, took over the Tigers' starting spot in left field, and compiled a .370 batting average. All three Detroit starters in the outfield batted above .370—Heilmann at .393 and Cobb at .378. Despite batting .354, Fothergill appeared in only 71 games, 40 at left field.

In 1926, as Cobb's defensive play forced him to withdraw from his spot in center field, Fothergill finally won a starting spot in the Detroit outfield. Between 1926 and 1929, he was one of the most feared hitters in baseball. In 1926, he hit for a batting average of .367, tied for third in the American League behind teammate Heinie Manush, Babe Ruth and tied with teammate Harry Heilmann. He also had a .421 on-base percentage (seventh best in the league) and hit for the cycle on September 26, 1926, the final game of the season. He finished 12th in the American League Most Valuable Player voting for 1926.

In 1927, Fothergill ranked among the American League leaders with a .359 batting average (fourth), drove in 114 RBIs (fifth), had a .516 slugging percentage (seventh), and scored 93 runs (seventh). In 1929, he ranked sixth in the American League with a .354 average.

For his career, Fothergill had a .325 batting average — the 38th best in major league history. He hit over .300 in eight major league seasons, including four seasons hitting over .340. He also hit 36 home runs, knocked in 582 RBIs, and had 1,064 hits.

During the latter half of his career, Fothergill became an accomplished pinch hitter. He is the only major league player to garner more than 200 pinch-hit at-bats with a career batting average over .300, and had a career pinch-hit average of .293 (76-259) with 55 RBI but no pinch-hit home runs. After Cobb's rookie season, Fothergill was the only batter to ever pinch-hit for Cobb, when he was struck out by Bill Bayne. Fothergill holds the Detroit Tigers team record for most hits in a season as a pinch-hitter with 19 in 1929.

Fothergill was fearless as a pinch hitter, even when he was injured. Teammate Ed Wells tells of a time when Cobb was looking for a pinch hitter in the ninth inning with men on base. Cobb looked down the bench and asked, "Who here can hit?" Fothergill had a badly sprained and taped ankle, but he volunteered, "I'll try." Cobb said, "My gosh, you can hardly walk." Cobb sent him in, and Fothergill hit a line drive into the right-field corner that should have been a double, but Fothergill fell about two-thirds of the way to first base. "He crawled the rest of the way and got a single. Just barely.... But that's the way we played ball back there and then."

Fothergill was popular with Tigers fans and became known in Detroit as "the People's Choice".

=== Chicago White Sox ===
On July 20, 1930, Fothergill was signed off waivers by the Chicago White Sox. He appeared in 52 games for the White Sox in 1930 and compiled a .296 batting average. He remained with the White Sox in 1931 and 1932, compiling batting averages of .282 and .295. During his three years with the White Sox, Fothergill appeared in 108 games in left field and 84 games in right field.

=== Boston Red Sox ===
In December 1932, Fothergill was traded by the White Sox to the Boston Red Sox. He hit .344 in 28 games for the Red Sox in 1933, mostly as a pinch-hitter. He played his last major league game on July 5, 1933, and was given his unconditional release by the Red Sox two days later. At the time of his release by Boston, Fothergill held that all-time major league record with 76 pinch-hits, having broken the prior record of 59 set by Ham Hyatt.

=== Late career ===
A few days after being released by the Red Sox, Fothergill signed with the Minneapolis Millers of the American Association at a reported salary of $600 a month plus a bonus. He appeared in 30 games for the 1933 Millers, compiled a .344 batting average, and helped lead the Millers to the American Association championship series against the Columbus Red Birds.

In the spring of 1934, Fothergill announced that, at age 36, he would not return to professional baseball. He instead signed to play semiprofessional baseball in Detroit. By June 1934, he led all players in the Detroit Amateur Baseball Federation with an .800 batting average.

In June 1937, he signed a one-year contract to serve as the baseball coach at Lawrence Institute of Technology in its inaugural season of college baseball in 1938.

== Personal life ==
Fothergill was married to Marie Barth in 1922. They had no children. Fothergill worked for the Ford Motor Company in Highland Park, Michigan. Fothergill was also an excellent bowler who bowled a perfect 300 game in February 1934.

Fothergill suffered two strokes in March 1938 and died at St. Joseph's Mercy Hospital after the second stroke. He was 40 years old at the time of his death. He was buried in his hometown of Massillon; six members of his Detroit bowling team were the pall bearers.

=== Girth ===
Fothergill was officially listed in major league records as being 5 feet 11 inches (1.80 m) tall and weighing 230 pounds (100 kg), but Tigers manager George Moriarty once joked that it was a moral victory when the dieting Fothergill trimmed down to 256 pounds (116 kg). Baseball author Lee Allen wrote of Fothergill: "He was one of the last of those rare spirits who appeared to play for the fun of it, and he seemed to be able to extract the fullest amount of pleasure from life. After the game, you could find him with a thick porterhouse steak and a seidel of beer, and he would chuckle to himself and mumble out of the side of his mouth, 'Imagine getting paid for a life like this!'"

Leo Durocher once called time when Fothergill came to the plate and protested to the plate umpire that Fothergill was "illegal!" He then continued, "Both those men can't bat at once!" The umpire ordered Durocher to return to his position, but Fothergill was so angry he glared at Durocher and struck out on three pitches, chasing Durocher into the dugout at the end of the inning.

In 1926, columnist Joe Williams remarked: "His barrier to greatness is a Graf Zeppelin belt line." The 1933 edition of Who's Who in Major League Baseball took this playful jab at the Tiger outfielder: "Fothergill gets over the ground with great agility for one of his peculiar architecture."

Another oft-repeated story recounts Fothergill was called out on strikes while on a crash diet (complete with rubber suits and a Victorian-style Turkish bath) in 1928. An argument ensued during which Fothergill bit home plate umpire Bill Dinneen who then threw Fothergill out of the game, leading Fothergill to explain: "That's OK. That was the first bite of meat I've had in a month."

Teammate Charlie Gehringer recalled his outsized teammate. "He had a time keeping his weight in shape, but he still ran pretty good. In fact, I remember we were in Philadelphia once and we were getting beat about 13–0 going into the last inning when he hit a home run. He's rounding the bases nice and easy -- and then when he gets to third base he comes running like a freight train and does a complete flip in the air and lands on home plate! Never saw him do that before."

Gehringer told another story about Fothergill and owner Frank Navin. Navin was constantly riding Fothergill about his weight problem. When Fothergill came to Navin's office in the winter to negotiate his contract, wearing a heavy overcoat to conceal the weight he had put on in the off-season. Navin figured out what Fothergill was up to and turned the heat way up in his office. Navin then sat back and engaged Fothergill in a long, drawn-out conversation about his family, hunting, and anything but the contract. As sweat poured off Fothergill, Navin suggested that he take off the coat, but Fothergill insisted he was comfortable. When the conversation finally got around to the contract, Fothergill wanted to get out of Navin's hot office so badly that he accepted Navin's first offer.

Gehringer also once said of Fothergill: "He was about as round as he was tall."

Fothergill once got into a beer drinking contest with Babe Ruth and teammate Harry Heilmann and won handily.

== See also ==
- List of Major League Baseball players to hit for the cycle

Achievements
Preceded by Roy Carlyle	Hitting for the cycle September 26, 1926	Succeeded by Jim Bottomley
