= Heinie Manush =

American baseball player (1901–1971)

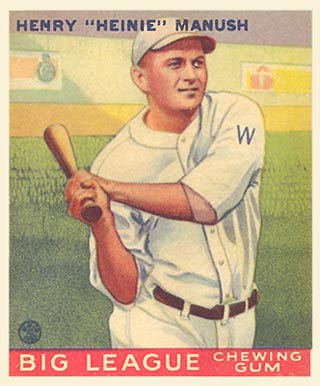
- 1933 baseball card of Manush
- Left fielder
- Born: July 20, 1901; Tuscumbia, Alabama, U.S.
- Died: May 12, 1971 (aged 69); Sarasota, Florida, U.S.
- Batted: Left Threw: Left

MLB debut
- April 20, 1923, for the Detroit Tigers

Last MLB appearance
- May 22, 1939, for the Pittsburgh Pirates

MLB statistics
- Batting average: .330
- Hits: 2,524
- Home runs: 110
- Runs batted in: 1,183
- Stats at Baseball Reference

Teams
- Detroit Tigers (1923–1927); St. Louis Browns (1928–1930); Washington Senators (1930–1935); Boston Red Sox (1936); Brooklyn Dodgers (1937–1938); Pittsburgh Pirates (1938–1939)

Career highlights and awards
- All-Star (1934); AL batting champion (1926); Washington Nationals Ring of Honor

Member of the National

Baseball Hall of Fame
- Induction: 1964
- Election method: Veterans Committee

Henry Emmett Manush (July 20, 1901 – May 12, 1971), nicknamed "Heinie", was an American baseball outfielder. He played professional baseball for 20 years from 1920 to 1939, including 17 years in Major League Baseball for the Detroit Tigers (1923–1927), St. Louis Browns (1928–1930), Washington Senators (1930–1935), Boston Red Sox (1936), Brooklyn Dodgers (1937–1938), and Pittsburgh Pirates (1938–1939). After retiring as a player, Manush was a minor league manager from 1940 to 1945, a scout for the Boston Braves in the late 1940s and a coach for the Senators from 1953 to 1954. He also scouted for the expansion Senators in the early 1960s. He was inducted into the Baseball Hall of Fame in 1964.

A native of Tuscumbia, Alabama, Manush was one of the best batters in baseball in the 1920s and 1930s. He compiled a .330 career batting average, won the American League batting championship in 1926 with a .378 batting average, finished one point short of a second batting championship in 1928, finished among the top four batters in the American League six times (1926, 1928–1929, and 1932–1934) and totaled more than 200 hits four times (1928–1929, 1932–1933). In 1928, he finished second in the voting for the American League Most Valuable Player (MVP) award after leading the American League with 241 hits and 47 doubles, while also hitting 20 triples and compiling 367 total bases. He also placed second in an unofficial vote in 1929—the American League had dropped the award that year, and the National League would drop it the following year. It was the same voters and structure as before however. He also finished third in the MVP voting in 1932 and 1933 and was the leading batter on the 1933 Washington Senators team that won the American League pennant and lost the 1933 World Series to the New York Giants.

Manush compiled 7 five-hit games and 52 four-hit games in his 17-year major league career. Manush holds the record for most hits in 10 consecutive games with 30 hits, occurring between June 10 to June 23, 1933.

Manush was also a solid defensive outfielder, appearing in 2,008 major league games, 1,381 as a left fielder, 312 as a center fielder, and 153 as a right fielder. He led the American League with 356 putouts and a .992 fielding percentage in left field in 1928, and five double plays turned by a left fielder in 1935. His 2,855 putouts in left field rank 21st in major league history.

== Early years ==
Manush was born in 1901 at Tuscumbia, Alabama, a city in The Shoals metropolitan area that is best known as the hometown of Helen Keller. His father, George Manush, immigrated to the United States from Germany in 1878 and worked as a cabinet maker and carpenter for a railroad company. His mother, Kate Manush, was born in Wisconsin, the daughter of German immigrants.

Manush was nicknamed "Heinie" due to his German ancestry. He was one of eight children in the family, seven boys and one girl. All seven boys took up baseball, five of them playing the game professionally. His brother Frank Manush was 18 years older than Heinie and played professional baseball from 1907 to 1921. Manush was seven years old when Frank made his major league debut in 1908 and later recalled: "When I was as young as 7 or 8, Frank used to bring home all his baseball equipment and uniform. I would look at that weird paraphernalia and wish I could wear it. From then on, baseball was all I ever had on my mind."

Manush started high school in Tuscumbia but transferred as a senior to Massey Military Academy, located 80 miles northeast of Tuscumbia in Cornersville, Tennessee. In 1918, Manush moved to Iowa to join another brother in the plumbing business. He then moved to California in March 1919 and played semipro baseball with a club in Los Angeles.

== Professional baseball ==
=== Minor leagues ===
Manush began his professional career in 1920, playing six games for the Portland Beavers in the Pacific Coast League. Moving to the Edmonton Eskimos in the Western Canada League in 1921, Manush hit .321 in 83 games. In 1922, he played for the Omaha Buffaloes in the Western League, hitting 20 home runs and compiling a .376 batting average that was second in the league behind only Carl East.

=== Detroit Tigers ===
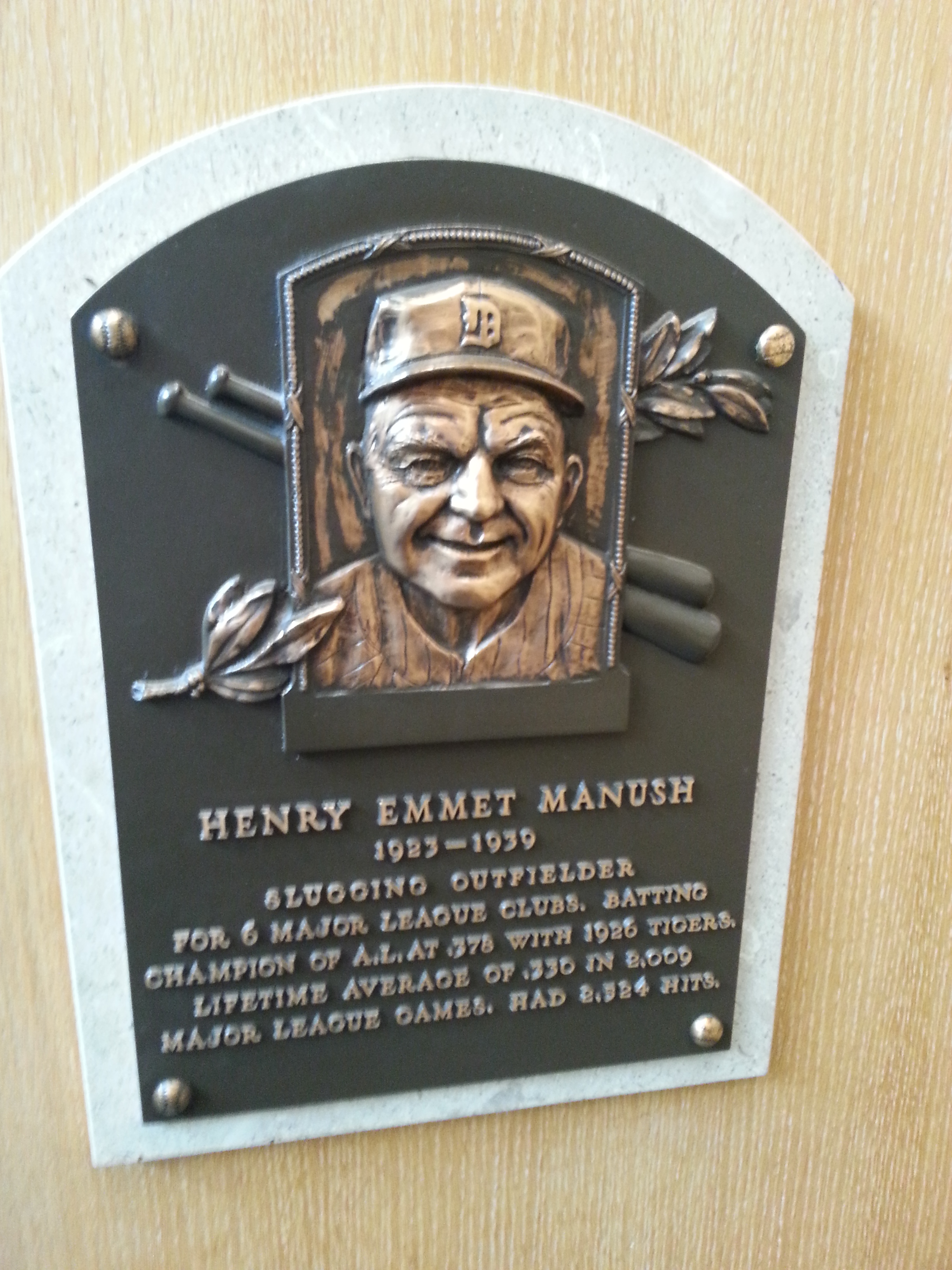
Manush's plaque at the Baseball Hall of Fame

After Manush's 1922 performance in Omaha, he was purchased by the Detroit Tigers. In early February 1923, Manush returned a signed contract with the Tigers, joining a star-studded Detroit outfield that included future Hall of Famers Harry Heilmann and Ty Cobb, as well as reliable sluggers Bobby Veach (.327 batting average in 1922), Bob Fothergill (.322 average in 1922), and Ira Flagstead (.308 average in 1922). During his rookie season with the Tigers, Manush played well enough to appear in 109 games, 79 as a left fielder, sharing the position with Veach. He compiled a .334 batting average, tenth highest in the American League. He also led the league with 17 times hit by pitch.

In 1924, Manush appeared in 120 games, 71 as the starting left fielder, and his batting average dropped 45 points to .289, though he again led the league with 16 times hit by pitch. Ty Cobb later accepted responsibility for Manush's slump in 1924. Cobb believed that, by studying the "science" of hitting, every batter could improve. Accordingly, he took Manush aside for several days early in the 1924 season to work on improving Manush's technique and batting stance. After working with Cobb, Manush's batting average and self-confidence plummeted. Cobb eventually came to the conclusion that, like Babe Ruth, Manush was a "natural" hitter rather than a "scientific" one and that it was a mistake to try to change a natural hitter.

In 1925, Manush moved to center field as a backup to Cobb. He appeared in 99 games, including 45 as the team's starting center fielder and 12 as the starting left fielder, and compiled a .302 batting average.

In 1926, Manush took over from Ty Cobb as the Tigers' starting center fielder, a position held by Cobb for 20 years. Manush had the best season of his career up to then, compiling a .378 batting average to win the American League batting title. He also ranked among the league's leaders with a .986 on-base plus slugging rating (second behind Babe Ruth) and a .564 slugging percentage (third behind Ruth and Al Simmons).

Manush trailed Babe Ruth for the batting championship going into the last day of the 1926 season. On the final day, September 26, the Tigers played a doubleheader, and Manush overtook Ruth by garnering six hits in nine at bats. By taking the batting crown, Manush also denied Ruth the Triple Crown. In a 1964 interview, Manush cited his beating Ruth on the last day of the 1926 season as one of two events in his career (the other was playing in the 1933 World Series) that most stood out for him.

Manush's improvement in 1926 was credited to the mentoring of teammate Harry Heilmann, who won American League batting crowns in 1921, 1923, 1925 and 1927. After Manush slumped in 1925, Heilmann, who had a talent for placing his hits, "took Manush in tow and taught him some tricks." After Heilmann's lessons, Manush developed a talent for dropping hits over second base between the left and center fielders.

In 1927, Manush continued as the Tigers' starting center fielder, appearing in 146 games at the position, but his batting average dropped by 80 points from .378 to .298. He did still rank among the American League leaders, however, with 18 triples (second), 101 runs scored (seventh), 177 hits (tenth), 55 extra base hits (tenth), and 262 total bases (tenth). He also rated among the league's leading center fielders with a .971 fielding percentage (second) and 356 putouts (third).

=== St. Louis Browns ===
On December 13, 1927, the Tigers traded Manush and first baseman Lu Blue to the St. Louis Browns in exchange for outfielder Harry Rice, pitcher Elam Vangilder, and a player to be named later. The trade was promptly criticized as being one-sided in favor of St. Louis, and proved as much when Manush had an outstanding 1928 season for the Browns.

Manush appeared in all 154 games as the Browns' starting left fielder in 1928 and compiled a .378 batting average, narrowly missing a second batting title to Goose Goslin who hit .379, one point higher than Manush. The battle for the batting title was the closest in 18 years, and Manush, who appeared in 19 more games than Goslin, led the league with 241 hits, 68 more than Goslin. Manush also led the American League in 1928 with 47 doubles and finished among the league leaders with 367 total bases (second behind Babe Ruth), 20 triples (second), a 6.8 offensive wins above replacement rating (third behind Ruth and Lou Gehrig), 80 extra base hits (third behind Ruth and Gehrig), a .575 slugging percentage (fourth), and 108 RBIs (fourth). He helped the Browns improve by 23 wins from a 59–94 record in 1927 to an 82–72 record in 1928. He also finished second behind Mickey Cochrane in close voting for the 1928 American League Most Valuable Player award, with Cochrane garnering 53 vote points to 51 for Manush.

Manush had another fine season in 1929, appearing in 145 games in left field for the Browns, while compiling the third-highest batting average (.355) in the American League. He was once again second in the AL MVP vote, losing to Lew Fonseca. He also finished in a three-way tie for the league lead with 45 doubles and ranked fifth in the league with 204 hits.

Manush was a holdout in 1930, refusing to report unless his salary was substantially increased. He finally signed a contract and reported to the club on March 20, 1930. Manush appeared in 48 games as the Browns' starting left fielder and compiled a .328 batting average.

=== Washington Senators ===
On June 13, 1930, the Browns traded Manush with pitcher Alvin Crowder to the Washington Senators in exchange for left fielder Goose Goslin, with whom Manush had battled for the 1928 batting title. It was reported at the time of the trade that the team owners were trying to rid themselves of players who held out, Manush and Goslin both having been holdouts at the start of the 1930 season. In the second half of the 1930 season, Manush took over Goslin's spot as Washington's left fielder, starting 86 games at the position and batting .362. In 1931, Manush started 146 games in left field and compiled a .307 batting average.

In 1932, Manush had one of the best seasons of his career. Continuing as the Senators' left fielder, he compiled a .342 batting average, fourth highest in the American League, and finished third in American League MVP voting behind Jimmie Foxx and Lou Gehrig. He also ranked among the league's leaders with 214 hits (second), 121 runs scored (third), 324 total bases (fifth), 14 triples (fifth), a .520 slugging percentage (sixth), and 116 RBIs (sixth).

Manush had another strong season in 1933. Appearing in 150 games in left field, he compiled the second highest batting average (.336) in the American League, trailing only Jimmie Foxx. He led the American League with 221 hits and 17 triples and ranked third in the league with 115 runs scored and 302 total bases. He also had a pair of long hitting streaks, first a 26 gamer one then a 33-game hitting streak in 1933 and finished third in the American League MVP voting. Between June 10th and June 23rd, Manush recorded 30 hits in 10 games, a MLB record and batted .600 (30–50) during that streak. His batting average increased from .303 to .354. He helped lead the 1933 Washington Senators to the American League pennant with a 99–53 record.

The Senators lost the 1933 World Series to the New York Giants, four games to one. Manush had only two hits and two walks, though he also scored two runs, batting just .111 in 20 plate appearances during the 1933 World Series. In Game 4, Manush was ejected by umpire Charlie Moran after arguing Moran's calling Manush out on a close play at first base. The Senators lost the game in the 11th inning, and the ejection of Manush was bitterly denounced by the Senators after the loss. After the game, baseball commissioner Kenesaw Mountain Landis opined that Manush should not have been ejected and ruled that Manush would be permitted to play the next day. Manush confessed 31 years later to his actual conduct on that day. He recalled beating out the throw at first, which would have been a turning point in the game with Goose Goslin already on second base. Manush was so angry at the call that he had pulled on Moran's rubber bow tie:

I didn't lay a hand on Moran, but I did grab that bow tie and pulled it two feet away from his neck and then I let it snap right back into his gullet. ... Even before he could recover his breath his thumb went up and I was out.

In 1934, Manush appeared in 137 games, 129 as the starting left fielder. He began the season on a torrid pace, batting .411 with 111 hits, 24 doubles and 10 triples by June 25. He was selected to play in the 1934 Major League Baseball All-Star Game held on July 10, the second ever All-Star Game. In the first inning, Manush was walked by Carl Hubbell and executed a double steal with Charlie Gehringer. From June 9 to June 20, 1934, Manush got 25 hits in 10 games. This was the third time in his career that Manush achieved this feat, making him one of three players to do this three times (Ty Cobb and Johnny Damon are the other two players to achieve this three times).

Manush slumped in the second half of the 1934 season, recording only 83 hits after June 25, but he still ranked among the league leaders for the 1934 season with a .349 batting average (third), 11 triples (second), 292 putouts in left field (second), a .980 fielding percentage in left field (second), and a 2.28 range factor per game in left field (second).

The slump that struck Manush in the last half of the 1934 season continued through the 1935 season. His batting average plummeted to .273, 76 points lower than his 1934 average, and he started only 109 games, fewer than in any season since 1925. Despite limited playing time, he led the American League's left fielders with five double plays turned in 1935. Manush was hitting .297 on August 23, then went through a 2-45 slump, was benched for the rest of the season, effectively ending his tenure in DC.

=== Boston, Brooklyn and Pittsburgh ===
On December 17, 1935, the Senators traded Manush to the Boston Red Sox in exchange for Roy Johnson and Carl Reynolds. At the time of the trade, some expressed hope that a change of scenery, and a reunion with manager Joe Cronin who had managed the Senators during Manush's best seasons, would help Manush return to his old form. Instead, the slump followed Manush to Boston, as he appeared in only 82 games, 72 as a starter, and compiled a .291 batting average. He was given an outright release by the Red Sox on September 27, 1936.

On December 9, 1936, Manush signed as a free agent with the Brooklyn Dodgers. The Dodgers had been seeking a young outfielder, and The Brooklyn Daily Eagle reacted with surprise to the signing of Manush, its headline reading, "Dodgers Search for Youth Unearths Manush, Aged 36". In spring training with the Dodgers, Manush broke out of his batting slump, leading the Florida circuit with a .571 average by late March. He became the Dodgers' starting right fielder in 1937, and in his first season facing National League pitching, Manush compiled a .333 batting average, ninth highest in the league.

Manush began the 1938 season with the Dodgers, but his batting slump returned as his average fell to .238 in 17 games. He was released by the Dodgers on May 15, 1938. A week after being released by the Dodgers, Manush signed with the Toronto Maple Leafs of the International League. He appeared in 81 games for Toronto and compiled a .310 batting average in 277 at bats.

On August 30, 1938, the Pittsburgh Pirates purchased Manush from Toronto as an "insurance outfielder and pinch hitter" for the last month of the pennant drive with the Chicago Cubs. Manush appeared as a pinch hitter in 15 games for the 1938 Pirates, batting .308 in 13 at bats. Manush returned to the Pirates in 1939, but played sparingly with no hits in 12 at bats. He appeared in his final major league game on May 22, 1939, at age 37, and was released by the Pirates on June 7, 1939.

=== Career statistics ===
Years	G	AB	R	H	2B	3B	HR	TB	RBI	SB	BB	AVG	OBP	SLG	OPS	FLD%
17	2008	7654	1288	2524	491	160	110	3665	1183	113	506	.330	.377	.479	.856	.979

=== Minor league player and manager ===
On June 12, 1939, Manush signed with the Toronto Maple Leafs, with whom he played for most of the 1938 season. He appeared in 66 games for Toronto and compiled a batting average of only .241. Manush spent the next five years as a player-manager in the Piedmont League for the Rocky Mount Red Sox in 1940, the Greensboro Red Sox in 1941 and 1942, the Roanoke Red Sox in 1943. In 1944, he served as manager of the Scranton Miners in the Eastern League, and in 1945 he became manager of the Martinsville A's in the Carolina League.

Manush scouted for the Boston Braves until 1948, then served as a coach for the Senators during the 1953 and 1954 seasons. In October 1954, after Chuck Dressen was hired as the Senators' new manager, he was replaced. He later scouted for the expansion Washington Senators in 1961–62.

=== Hall of Fame and legacy ===
In 17 seasons as a player in the major leagues, Manush appeared in 2,008 games, 1,381 as a left fielder, 312 as a center fielder, and 153 as a right fielder, and compiled a .330 batting average with 2,524 hits, 1,288 runs scored, and 1,183 RBIs. His notable career accomplishments include the following:

- His .330 career batting average ranks 33rd in major league history. His .378 average in 1926 was the highest in Major League Baseball that year, six points higher than Babe Ruth, thus depriving Ruth of the Triple Crown.
- His 241 hits in 1928, a 154-game season, was the fifth highest single-season total to that point in major league history. It still ranks as the 11th highest single-season total.
- His 2,855 career putouts in left field rank 21st in major league history. His 1928 total of 356 putouts in left field was the ninth highest single-season total in major league history at the time. He also held the career high fielding pct for a Left Fielder when he retired in '39, .980.
- His 33 career double plays turned in left field rank 25th in major league history.

In February 1964, Manush was elected by the Veterans Committee to the Baseball Hall of Fame. On learning the news, Manush, at his home in Sarasota, Florida, told reporters, "It's quite a shock to me to be picked ... I feel wonderful ... I had no idea this would ever happen to me."

The 1942 motion picture Obliging Young Lady opens with a comedic sequence in which Edmond O'Brien keeps repeating "Heinie Manush, Heinie Manush" in cadence with the sound of the train on which he is riding. At one point, a porter interrupts, "Who is Heinie Manush?", and O'Brien replies, "The great baseball player." In the dining car, O'Brien continues even as he orders, "Filet mignon that's for me, filet mignon that's for me, Heinie Manush, Heinie Manush, Heinie Manush, Heinie Manush, filet mignon, medium rare, Heinie Manush, Heinie Manush." The repetitive, onomatopoeic nature of the phrase fit the sound of the train so well that other riders began to pick it up, driving the conductor to distraction.

Manush was inducted into the Michigan Sports Hall of Fame in 1964, and later posthumously into the Alabama Sports Hall of Fame in 1972.

== Family and later years ==
Manush was married, and he and his wife Betty had three daughters, Shirley, Lillis, and Sue. Manush's wife died in June 1949 at age 46 after undergoing an operation at Harper Hospital in Detroit.

Manush picked up the game of golf in 1935 and he won multiple city golf championships in Sarasota, Florida, where he lived in retirement.

Manush fought an extended battle against throat cancer, was placed in a Sarasota nursing home where he died two months later in May 1971 at age 69. He was interred next to his wife Betty at Sarasota Memorial Park.

== See also ==
- List of Major League Baseball career hits leaders
- List of Major League Baseball career doubles leaders
- List of Major League Baseball career triples leaders
- List of Major League Baseball career runs scored leaders
- List of Major League Baseball career runs batted in leaders
- List of Major League Baseball batting champions
- List of Major League Baseball annual doubles leaders
- List of Major League Baseball annual triples leaders
- List of Major League Baseball triples records
- List of Major League Baseball career putouts as a left fielder leaders
