= Rufe Clarke =

American baseball player (1900–1983)

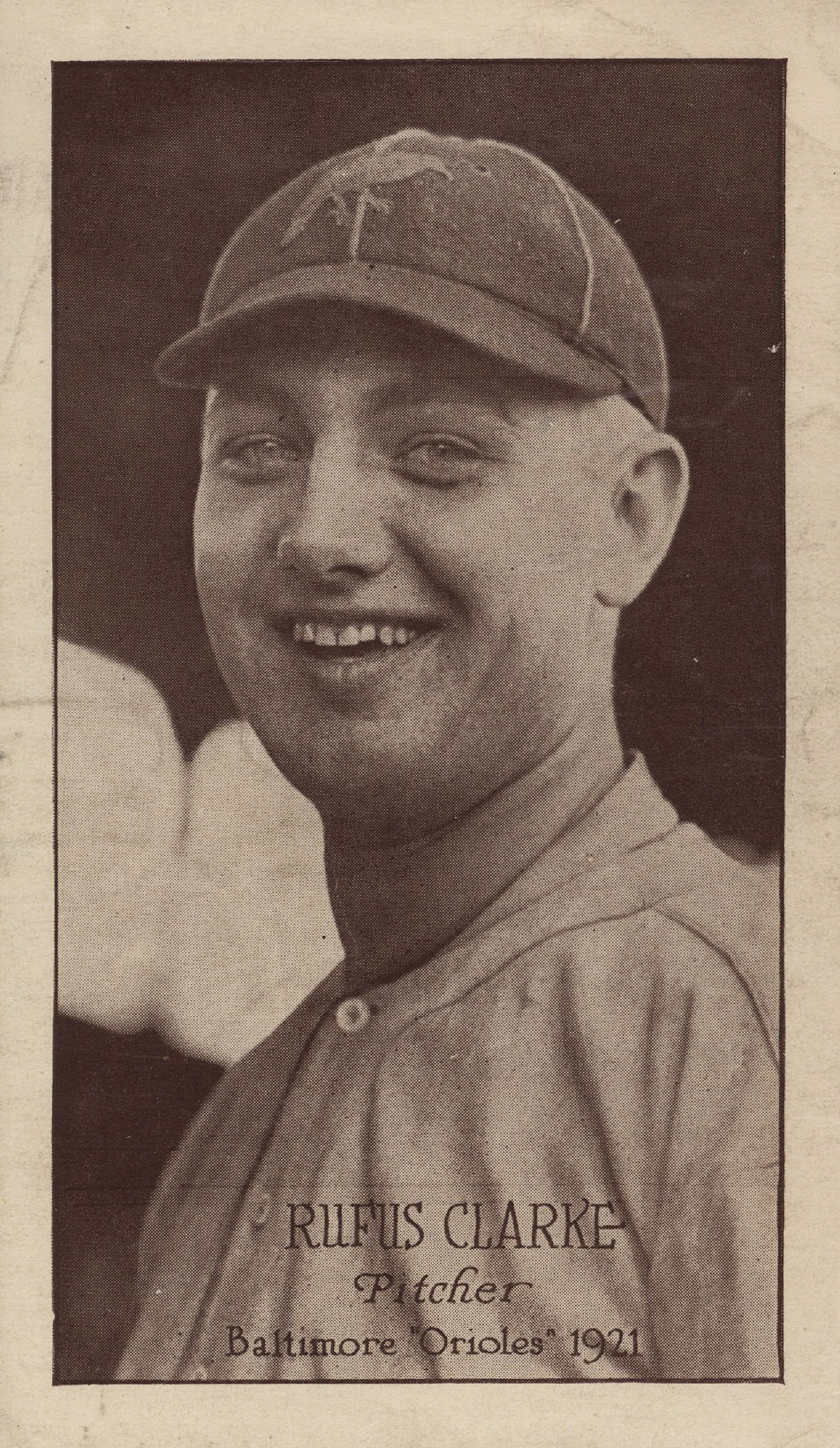
- Clarke with the Baltimore Orioles (IL) in 1921
- Pitcher
- Born: April 13, 1900; Estill, South Carolina, U.S.
- Died: February 8, 1983 (aged 82); Columbia, South Carolina, U.S.
- Batted: Right Threw: Right

MLB debut
- September 3, 1923, for the Detroit Tigers

Last MLB appearance
- May 19, 1924, for the Detroit Tigers

MLB statistics
- Win–loss record: 1–1
- Earned run average: 3.97
- Strikeouts: 3
- Stats at Baseball Reference

Teams
- Detroit Tigers (1923–1924)

Rufus Rivers "Rufe" Clarke (April 13, 1900 – February 8, 1983) was a Major League Baseball pitcher who played for the Detroit Tigers in 1923 and 1924.

== Early life ==
Clarke was born on April 13, 1900, in Estill, South Carolina. He was second of six children born to parents Sumpter Mills Clarke and Virginia Pocahontas (née Lafitte) Clarke. Rufus played first base in high school in Estill and graduated in 1916. He had a 6-foot-1, burley 203 pound frame. He served briefly in the army late in 1918 and graduated from Davidson College with a Bachelor of Arts degree in May 1919.

== Amateur career ==
While at Davidson in 1916, Clarke joined Coach Fetzer converted him into a pitcher two years later. Clarke entered the record books in 1919 with shutouts over Virginia (5–0) and North Carolina (1–0 in thirteen innings). His highest strikeout rate was 13 in a 15-inning game against the Tar Heels in a 4–3 loss.

== Professional career ==
The Baltimore Orioles of the International League tried to sign Rufus while he was playing at Davidson College. However, his brother Sumpter Jr. signed with the minor league Orioles in 1918 instead. Rufus signed with Baltimore in December 1920, but did not join the team until May 9, 1921, partly due to appendix surgery in January. He was put in for the last two innings in a game against the Rochester Colts in Rochester, New York. He surrendered only one hit in the 9–5 loss.

Clarke entered his 1922 season in a utility player role as a relief pitcher and an outfielder. He went three innings in a loss to the Toronto Maple Leafs on April 23. Two days later, he was a backup in left field and hit a single and scored a run. On April 30, he gave up two walks in relief. Dunn sent him down to the Atlanta Crackers soon after. He then played for the Augusta Tigers.

In early July 1923, Clarke and Harry Smythe were purchased by the Detroit Tigers for $11,000. A 23-year-old Clarke made his Major League debut on September 3 at home versus the Chicago White Sox, where he pitched in relief in the seventh inning. He surrendered two hits but pitched a scoreless inning and ended up with his first career win. He pitched a total of six innings in five games, and was invited to spring training next season and played with the team in 1924. Injuries and illnesses led to this being his final season.
