= Les Burke =

American baseball player (1902–1975)

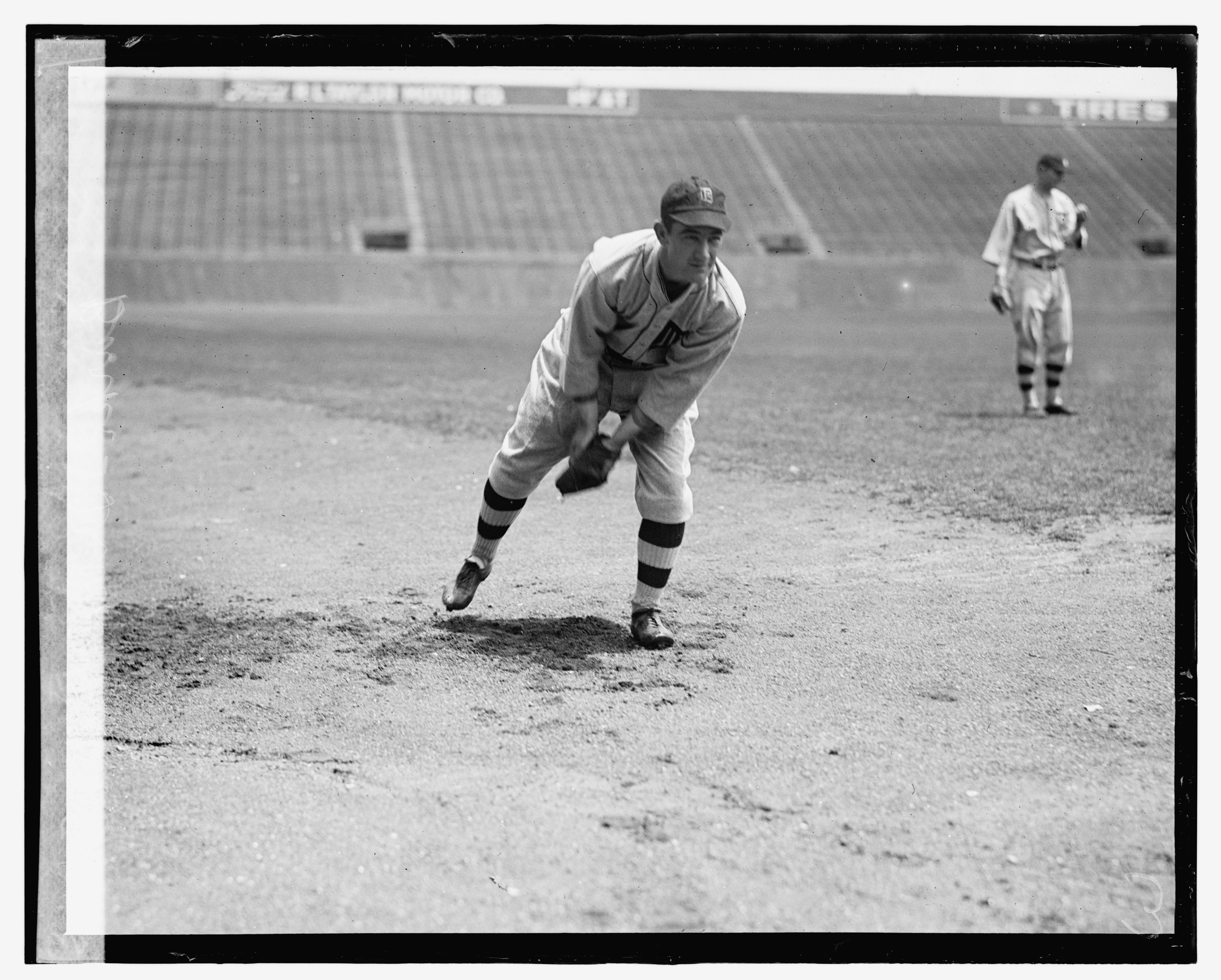
- Second baseman
- Born: December 18, 1902; Lynn, Massachusetts, U.S.
- Died: May 6, 1975 (aged 72); Danvers, Massachusetts, U.S.
- Batted: Left Threw: Right

MLB debut
- May 2, 1923, for the Detroit Tigers

Last MLB appearance
- September 15, 1926, for the Detroit Tigers

MLB statistics
- Fielding percentage: .952
- Putouts: 267
- Batting average: .259
- Assists: 369
- Stats at Baseball Reference

Teams
- Detroit Tigers (1923–1926)

Leslie Kingston Burke (December 18, 1902 – May 6, 1975), nicknamed "Buck", was an American second baseman who played four seasons in Major League Baseball (MLB). He played professional baseball from 1923 to 1932, beginning his career with the Detroit Tigers and then the Toronto Maple Leafs of the International League.

== Early years ==
Burke was born in 1902 in Lynn, Massachusetts. He attended Lynn English High School.

== Professional baseball ==
Burke signed with the Detroit Tigers in February 1923, having played only semi-pro baseball in the sandlots of Boston. He made his major league debut with the Tigers on May 2, 1923, and appeared in seven games that year, compiling a .100 batting average. He went on to appear in 80 games for the Richmond Colts in the Virginia League during the 1923 season and compiled a .346 batting average there.

Burke returned to the Tigers for the 1924, 1925, and 1926 seasons. He appeared in 194 major league games for the Tigers, 126 at second base, nine at third base, and six at shortstop. His best season was 1925 when he had a .289 batting average and a .357 on-base percentage. His career batting average with Detroit was .259, and he had 131 hits, 73 runs scored, 47 runs batted in, and 46 bases on balls.

Although his major league career ended in 1926, Burked continued to play professional baseball for the Toronto Maple Leafs of the International League for six years from 1927 to 1932. He was Toronto's starting second baseman for much of that time, appearing in 709 games, 657 at second base, and compiling a .281 batting average.

== Later years ==
Burke died in 1975 in Danvers, Massachusetts, at age 72. He is buried in Swampscott Cemetery.
