= Bobby Veach =

American baseball player (1888–1945)

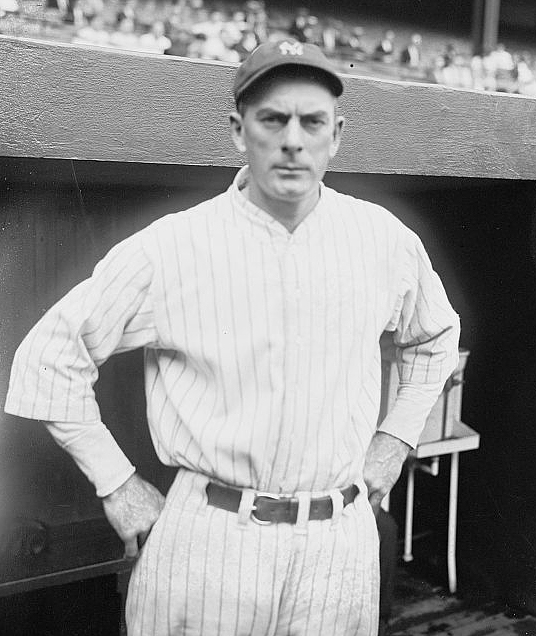
- Veach in 1925
- Left fielder
- Born: June 29, 1888; St. Charles, Kentucky, U.S.
- Died: August 7, 1945 (aged 57); Detroit, Michigan, U.S.
- Batted: Left Threw: Right

MLB debut
- August 6, 1912, for the Detroit Tigers

Last MLB appearance
- October 2, 1925, for the Washington Senators

MLB statistics
- Batting average: .310
- Hits: 2,063
- Home runs: 64
- Runs batted in: 1,166
- Stats at Baseball Reference

Teams
- Detroit Tigers (1912–1923); Boston Red Sox (1924–1925); New York Yankees (1925); Washington Nationals (1925)

Career highlights and awards
- 3× AL RBI leader (1915, 1917, 1918)

Robert Hayes Veach (June 29, 1888 – August 7, 1945) was an American professional baseball player from 1910 to 1930 including 14 seasons in the major leagues. He was the starting left fielder for the Detroit Tigers from 1912 to 1923 and also played for the Boston Red Sox (1924–1925), New York Yankees (1925), and Washington Senators (1925).

Veach hit for both power and average. He compiled a .310 career batting average and finished second to Ty Cobb for the 1919 American League batting title with a .355 average. He also led the American League in runs batted in (RBIs) three times (1915, 1917, and 1918) and was among the league leaders 10 times. Nobody in baseball had as many RBIs or extra base hits as Veach from 1915 to 1922. He is also the only player born in the state of Kentucky to have collected 2,000 hits and 1,000 RBIs. In the timespan of his career, Veach was 9th in hits for all players who played in that time and when he retired, he was one of just 48 players with 2,000 hits in MLB history.

Veach was among the best defensive outfielders of his era, regularly ranking among the league leaders in putouts, range factor, and fielding percentage. He is the all-time American League leader in double plays by a left fielder with 42. Despite being one of the most productive hitters in baseball during his years in Detroit, Veach played in the shadows of three Detroit outfielders who won 16 batting titles and were inducted into the Baseball Hall of Fame: Cobb in center field and Sam Crawford followed by Harry Heilmann in right field. Detroit's 1915 outfield consisting of Veach, Cobb, and Crawford was ranked by baseball historian Bill James as the greatest outfield in history.

== Early years ==
Veach was born in Island, Kentucky, in 1888. His family moved to Madisonville, Kentucky, when he was 12 years old. His father was a coal miner, and Veach also began working in the coal mine as a boy. In 1915, Veach recalled: "I started in as a miner when I was fourteen years old and worked at it in the winters until a couple years ago, long after I was earning money as a player." At age 17, Veach moved to Herrin, Illinois, where he began playing semi-pro baseball.

== Minor league career ==
Veach began his professional baseball career in 1910 as a pitcher with the Peoria Distillers of the Illinois–Indiana–Iowa League. At the start of the season, he was sent to the Kankakee Kays of the Northern Association. He compiled a 10–5 record at Kankakee and was recalled to Peoria. In 1911, Veach was converted from a pitcher into an outfielder. He appeared in 132 games for Peoria, compiling a .297 batting average with 40 extra base hits. Veach began the 1912 season with Peoria, batting .325 with 24 extra base hits in the first 56 games of the season. In July 1912, he was promoted to the Indianapolis Indians of the American Association. He remained in Indianapolis for only two months and two days before being purchased by the Detroit Tigers.

== Major league career ==
=== 1912–1914 ===
In early September, Veach was purchased by Detroit from Indianapolis. He was promptly inserted into the Tigers' lineup, replacing Davy Jones as the left fielder in an outfield that included future Baseball Hall of Famers Ty Cobb and Sam Crawford. Veach made his major league debut on September 6, 1912, at age 24. He appeared in 23 games for Detroit in 1912, compiling a .342 batting average in 79 at bats. Veach remained the Tigers' starting left fielder for 12 years.

In 1913, as Veach adjusted to playing in the major leagues, his batting average declined to .269, but he continued to show power and speed with 22 doubles, 10 triples, and 22 stolen bases. He also showed patience at the plate, drawing 53 bases on balls to boost his on-base percentage to .346.

Veach improved steadily in 1914, raising his batting average to .275. He also had 14 triples, which was the fifth best total in the American League that season, trailing teammate Sam Crawford's total of 26 triples, which remains the American League record. His 74 RBIs in 1914 also ranked ninth in the league. Veach also continued to show patience at the plate, drawing 50 bases on balls and ranking fifth in the league with an at bat to strikeout ratio of 18.1. He also showed great range in the outfield, ranking fourth among the league's outfielders with 282 putouts.

=== 1915 ===
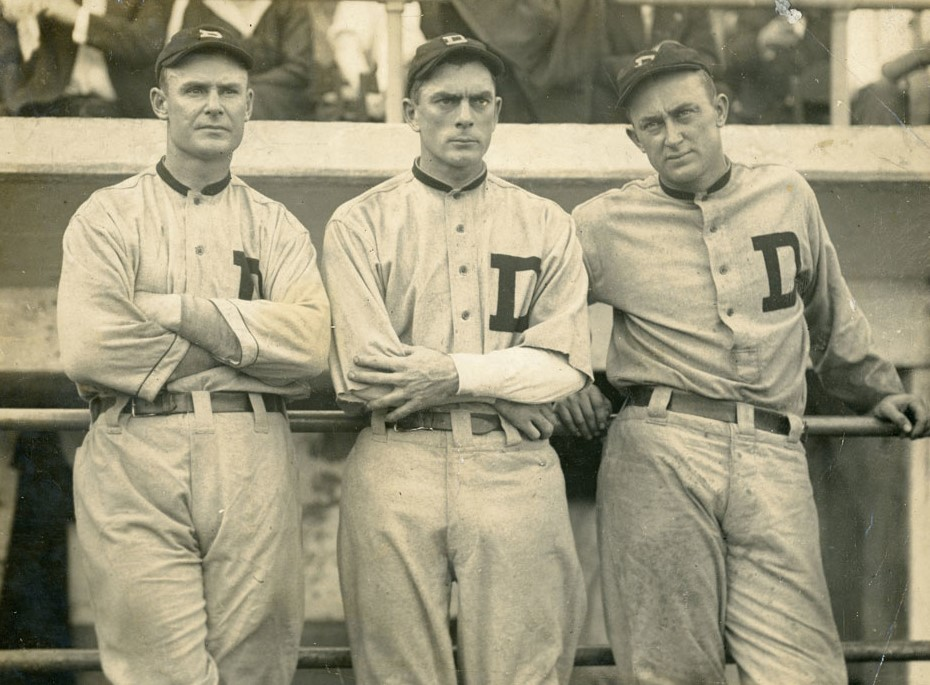
Crawford, Veach, and Cobb in 1915

In 1915, Veach had a breakout season, becoming one of the most dominant batters in the American League. His batting average increased by 38 points to .313, and he led the American League with 40 doubles (nine more than any other player) and 112 RBIs (tied with teammate Sam Crawford). He was also among the league leaders with 53 extra base hits (2nd), 178 hits (3rd), 247 total bases (3rd), .313 batting average (6th), .390 on-base percentage (6th), .434 slugging percentage (7th), and 68 bases on balls (10th).

Veach also performed well defensively. His 297 putouts ranked fifth among the league's outfielders, and his .975 fielding percentage also ranked fifth.

The Tigers' 1915 outfield, with Veach in left, Cobb in center, and Crawford in right, was ranked by baseball historian Bill James as the greatest outfield of all time. During the 1915 season, Baseball Magazine published a five-page feature story on Veach, concluding that "with his advent the Detroit outfield is one of the most powerful, if not the most powerful, ever assembled on a diamond." Though the league average batting average in 1915 was .248, Cobb hit .369 with 99 RBIs, Crawford hit .299 and drove in 112 runs, and Veach hit .313 with 112 RBIs. The three Detroit outfielders ranked #1, #2, and #3 in total bases and RBIs. The 1915 Tigers won 100 games but finished in second place, one game behind the Boston Red Sox.

=== 1916–1923 ===
Veach continued his solid hitting from 1915 to 1923, batting over .306 in eight of those nine years. Veach finished among the American League leaders in hits (8 times), batting average (6 times), doubles (8 times), triples (8 times), RBIs (10 times), extra base hits (7 times), and total bases (8 times).

On June 9, 1916, Veach scored a run to end Babe Ruth's scoreless innings streak at 25. Ruth then evened the score with one of the longest home runs ever at Navin Field, deep into the right field bleachers.

Veach had his best year as a batter in 1919 when he led the American League in hits (191), doubles (41), and triples (17). Only Babe Ruth and Ty Cobb topped him in other offensive categories. His .355 batting average was second to Cobb, and his 65 extra base hits, 101 RBIs, and 279 total bases were second behind Ruth.

On September 17, 1920, he became the first Detroit Tiger to hit for the cycle with six hits in a 12-inning game.

In 1921, Veach was the subject of a motivational tactic by new player-manager Cobb. Cobb believed that Veach, who came to bat with a smile and engaged in friendly conversation with umpires and opposing pitchers, was too easygoing. Tigers historian Fred Lieb described Veach as a "happy-go-lucky guy, not too brilliant above the ears", who "was as friendly as a Newfoundland pup with opponents as well as teammates". (Fred Lieb, "The Detroit Tigers") Hoping to light a fire in Veach, Cobb persuaded Harry Heilmann, who followed Veach in the batting order, to taunt Veach from the on-deck circle. "I want you to make him mad. Real mad. ... [W]hile you're waiting, call him a yellow belly, a quitter and a dog. ... Take that smile off his face." The tactic may have worked, as Veach had career-highs in RBIs (126) and home runs (16), and his batting average jumped from .308 to .338. Cobb had promised to tell Veach about the scheme when the season was over but never did. When Heilmann tried to explain, Veach reportedly snarled, "Don't come sucking around me with that phony line." Veach never forgave Heilmann.

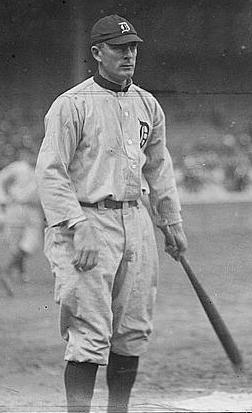
Veach in 1917

In the eight years from 1915 to 1922, Veach had 852 RBIs and 450 extra base hits, more than any other player. The top five in RBI during these eight years:

1. Bobby Veach – 859
2. Ty Cobb – 665
3. Del Pratt – 641
4. Rogers Hornsby – 638
5. Babe Ruth – 623

The top five in extra base hits:

1. Veach – 450
2. Ruth – 445
3. Speaker – 444
4. Cobb – 418
5. Hornsby – 414

=== Veach as a left fielder ===
In addition to his batting skills, Veach's speed and strong arm made him a fine left fielder. He led the American League in games played in left field seven times (1914–1915, 1917–1918, and 1920–1922). He led the American League in putouts by an outfielder in 1921 with 384. He also led the league in assists with 26 in 1920.

Veach's 206 career assists and 2.28 range factor are among the top 10 in Major League history for left fielders. Though left fielders generally receive fewer fielding chances than other outfielders, Veach regularly covered more ground and accepted more chances than the league average for all outfielders. His 1921 range factor of 2.72 is one of the highest season totals for a left fielder in Major League history. His 384 putouts in 1921 and 26 assists in 1920 are also among the highest by a left fielder since 1900.

Veach's range as an outfielder is also shown by a comparison with Ty Cobb, the center fielder he played beside for most of his career. In 1914, Veach had 282 putouts and 22 assists, compared to 177 and 8 for Cobb. Though center fielders typically receive more chances, and Cobb had a reputation as a fine center fielder, Veach bested Cobb in chances in seven of the nine years they played side by side in the Detroit outfield: 1914 (304–185), 1916 (356–343), 1918 (291–237), 1919 (352–291), 1920 (383–254), 1921 (405–328), and 1922 (391–344).

=== Boston and New York ===
In 1923, Veach continued to hit for average at .321, but his RBI production dropped to 39. Likely his most noteworthy contribution was in spotting the talent of Charlie Gehringer in a sandlot game that saw him arrange a tryout with Detroit; Gehringer subsequently had a Hall of Fame career with the Tigers.

In January 1924, the Tigers sold Veach to the Boston Red Sox. That year, Veach regained his power, with 49 extra base hits and 99 RBIs.

In May 1925, the Red Sox traded Veach to the New York Yankees. He played 56 games for the Yankees, batting .353 with a .474 slugging percentage. On August 9, 1925, in his final season, Veach became one of two players to pinch hit for Babe Ruth in the years after Babe switched from a pitcher to an outfielder. The Chicago Tribune reported the next day: "The fans were treated to the unusual spectacle of His Royal Highness being yanked for a pinch hitter."

=== Washington ===
The Yankees released Veach less than two weeks later, and he was picked up by the Washington Senators. This proved to be good luck for Veach, as the Senators won the 1925 pennant. On September 19, 1925, Veach broke up Ted Lyons's bid for a no-hitter with a two-out ninth-inning single. The young Goose Goslin got the start for the Senators at left field, but Veach got one at bat in the World Series, pinch-hitting for Muddy Ruel in Game 2. Fittingly, Veach collected an RBI on a sacrifice fly in his final Major League at bat. Facing the Pittsburgh Pirates, the Senators lost the Series in seven games.

=== Last baseball days ===
After ending his Major League career in 1925, Veach played four seasons with the Toledo Mud Hens of the American Association from 1926 to 1929. In 1927, a 39-year-old Veach led the Mud Hens (with manager Casey Stengel) to their first American Association crown with a 101–67 record. Veach had a .363 batting average and drove in a league-leading 145 RBIs. The next year, at age 40, Veach hit .382 to capture the 1928 American Association batting crown.

== Career statistics ==
G	AB	R	H	2B	3B	HR	RBI	SB	CS	BB	SO	BA	OBP	SLG	TB	SH	HBP	FLD%
1821	6656	953 (a)	2063	393	147	64	1166 (b)	195	84	571	367	.310	.370	.442	2942	271	59	.964

- Note: (a) Baseball Reference and Retrosheet list his runs at 957. Baseball Almanac, The Baseball Cube, and Fangraphs list his runs at 953. MLB.com lists his runs at 952.
- (b) Baseball Reference and Retrosheet list his RBI total at 1174. Baseball Almanac, The Baseball Cube, Fangraphs, and MLB.com list his RBI total at 1166.

== Later years ==
In December 1943, Veach underwent an abdominal operation at Grace Hospital in Detroit. Veach died in 1945 at his home in Detroit after a long illness at the age of 57. He was survived by his wife and three sons. Veach was buried at White Chapel Memorial Park Cemetery in Troy, Michigan.

== See also ==
- List of Major League Baseball career hits leaders
- List of Major League Baseball career triples leaders
- List of Major League Baseball career runs batted in leaders
- List of Major League Baseball annual doubles leaders
- List of Major League Baseball annual triples leaders
- List of Major League Baseball annual runs batted in leaders
- List of Major League Baseball single-game hits leaders
- List of Major League Baseball players to hit for the cycle

Achievements
Preceded by George Burns	Hitting for the cycle September 17, 1920	Succeeded by Bob Meusel
