= Harry Heilmann =

American baseball player and broadcaster (1894–1951)

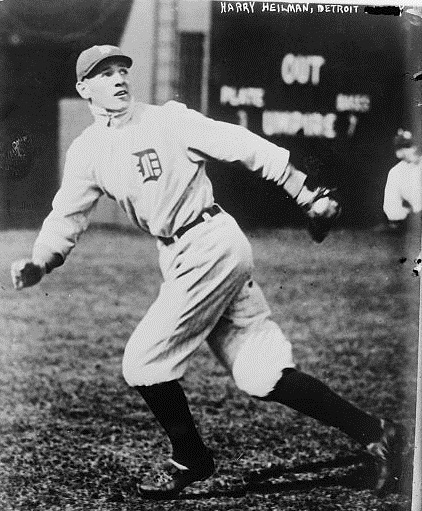
- Heilmann in 1917
- Right fielder / First baseman
- Born: August 3, 1894; San Francisco, California, U.S.
- Died: July 9, 1951 (aged 56); Southfield, Michigan, U.S.
- Batted: Right Threw: Right

MLB debut
- May 16, 1914, for the Detroit Tigers

Last MLB appearance
- May 31, 1932, for the Cincinnati Reds

MLB statistics
- Batting average: .342
- Hits: 2,660
- Home runs: 183
- Runs batted in: 1,543
- Stats at Baseball Reference

Teams
- Detroit Tigers (1914, 1916–1929); Cincinnati Reds (1930, 1932)

Career highlights and awards
- 4× AL batting champion (1921, 1923, 1925, 1927)

Member of the National

Baseball Hall of Fame
- Induction: 1952
- Vote: 86.8% (12th ballot)

Harry Edwin Heilmann (August 3, 1894 – July 9, 1951), nicknamed "Slug", was an American baseball player and radio announcer. He played professional baseball for 19 years between 1913 and 1932, including 17 seasons in Major League Baseball with the Detroit Tigers (1914, 1916–1929) and Cincinnati Reds (1930, 1932). He was a play-by-play announcer for the Tigers for 17 years from 1934 to 1950.

Heilmann won four American League batting championships, securing the honors in 1921, 1923, 1925 and 1927. He appeared in 2,147 major league games, including 1,525 games as a right fielder and 448 as a first baseman and compiled a career batting average of .342, the 12th highest in major league history, and third highest among right-handed batters. At the time of his retirement in 1932, Heilmann ranked sixth in major league history with 542 doubles and eighth with 1,543 RBIs. He remains one of only six players in American League history to hit .400 for a season, having accomplished the feat in 1923 with a .403 batting average. He also hit .394 in 1921. At his peak from 1921 to 1927, Heilmann compiled a .380 batting average, .452 on-base percentage, .583 slugging percentage, and averaged 116 RBI, 41 doubles, 11 triples, and 104 runs scored per season. From 1919 through 1930, Heilmann hit over .300 for 12 consecutive seasons. He also compiled six 5-hit games and 49 4-hit games in his 17-year major league career.

After retiring from baseball, Heilmann ran unsuccessfully for the office of Detroit City Treasurer and operated a semipro baseball team in 1933 and, in 1934, began a career as a radio broadcaster. From 1934 to 1942, he was play-by-play announcer for the Tigers on station WXYZ and the Michigan Radio Network, covering parts of Michigan located outside metropolitan Detroit, while rival Ty Tyson called games for station WWJ in Detroit exclusively. From 1943 to 1950, Heilmann was the exclusive radio voice of the Tigers throughout the state. Heilmann died from lung cancer in July 1951; he was posthumously elected to the Baseball Hall of Fame six months later in January 1952 after garnering 86.75% of the votes.

== Early years ==
Heilmann was born in San Francisco in 1894. His father, Richard W. Heilmann, was born in 1860 at Sacramento, California, the son of an Irish mother and a father from Saxony. His mother, Mary (McVoy) Heilmann, sometimes referred to as Mollie, was born in 1864 in County Roscommon, Ireland. Harry was the couple's fourth surviving child, having an older sister, May, and two older brothers, Richard Jr., and Walter. Heilmann's father operated a soap business, ran as a Republican for the office of Supervisor of San Francisco's Ninth Ward in 1896, and died in June 1897 at age 36. As a boy in the 1890s and continuing at least through the time of the 1900 Census, Heilmann lived with his family at 708A Brannan Street in what is now the South of Market district of San Francisco.

Heilmann's older brother, Walter, was a gifted athlete who attended Sacred Heart Cathedral Preparatory (then "Sacred Heart College") in San Francisco. On June 3, 1908, a year after the city's devastation by earthquake, Walter died at age 16 while on a sailboat excursion with three schoolmates to visit the battleship USS Connecticut in drydock at the Hunters Point Naval Shipyard, near the present site of Candlestick Park. The boat capsized in a squall, and Walter drowned while trying to swim to shore; the other three boys were rescued.

As of 1910, Heilmann was living with his mother at 112 Sixteenth Street in the Dogpatch neighborhood of San Francisco. Heilmann followed his older brother to what is now Sacred Heart Cathedral Preparatory, where he played baseball, track and field, and basketball. He graduated from Sacred Heart in 1912 at age 17 with a collegiate certificate. After graduating from Sacred Heart, Heilmann worked as a bookkeeper for the Mutual Biscuit Company.

== Professional baseball career ==
=== Minor leagues ===
Heilmann appeared in a semipro baseball game in 1913 for a team from Hanford, California. While playing for Hanford, he was signed by a scout for the Portland Beavers of the Pacific Coast League (PCL). After being signed by the Beavers, Heilmann was assigned to the Portland Colts of the Northwestern League. He compiled a .305 batting average in 122 games for the Colts.

=== Detroit Tigers ===
==== 1914 to 1920 seasons ====
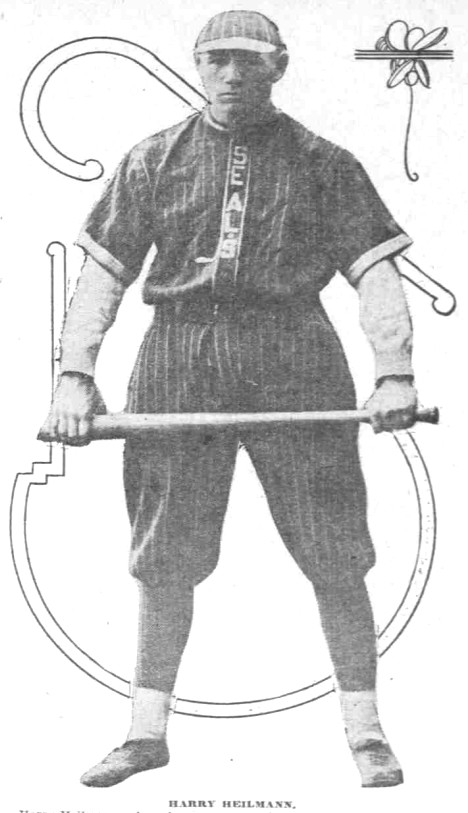
Heilmann won the PCL batting title with the San Francisco Seals in 1915

In September 1913, Heilmann was drafted by the Detroit Tigers. He made his major league debut with the Tigers on May 16, 1914, and played in 68 games that year, batting .225 and committing six errors in 31 games in the outfield (29 games in center field) for an .870 fielding percentage.

For the 1915 season, the Tigers sent Heilmann to the San Francisco Seals of the Pacific Coast League (PCL). Heilmann missed the latter portion of the season after suffering from dizzy spells. Before the health problems sidelined him, Heilmann appeared in 98 games for the Seals and compiled a .364 batting average and .544 slugging percentage with 23 doubles and 12 home runs. His .364 batting average led the PCL for the 1915 season.

Heilmann returned to the Tigers in 1916 and appeared in 136 games, including 30 games at first base and 77 as an outfielder. Although his .282 batting average was low by the standards he would set later, he ranked among the American League leaders with 30 doubles (seventh best), 77 RBIs (sixth best) and 43 extra base hits (eighth). He also became a favorite in Detroit for his actions off the field. On July 25, 1916, he saved a woman whose vehicle had rolled into the Detroit River, diving into the water to rescue her, although two others died in the accident. His heroic act was reported in the national press, and he was loudly applauded at the next day's game.

He continued to improve at the plate in 1917, once again ranking among the American League leaders with 85 RBIs (fourth), five home runs (seventh) and 11 triples (eighth); but he was called "Slug" due to his notoriously slow running and difficulties in the field. In 1917, the Tigers tried playing him in right field (95 games), center field (28) and first base (27), but he was not particularly good at any of those positions.

In 1918, Heilmann appeared in 79 games for the Tigers, 40 in right field and 37 at first base, compiling a .276 batting average. In mid-July 1918, he left the Tigers to enlist in the United States Navy during World War I. He served as a quartermaster on submarines off the West Coast of the United States.

He returned to the Tigers in 1919 and had his best season to date, ranking among the American League leaders with a .320 batting average (10th best), .477 slugging percentage (seventh), 92 RBIs (fourth), 53 extra base hits (fourth again), 15 triples (second), 256 total bases (fifth), 172 hits (sixth) and eight home runs (eighth). He had another strong year in 1920 with a .309 average, 41 extra base hits and 89 RBIs, but he continued to fall short in the field in those two years. Detroit manager Hughie Jennings made him the Tigers' starting first baseman, and he led the league in errors at that position both years, including 31 in 1919 for a .979 fielding percentage.

Heilmann was married on October 5, 1920, to Mary H. Maynes, commonly known as Mae. They had a daughter, Mary Ellen, and a son, Harry Jr., and lived in Detroit.

==== 1921 season ====
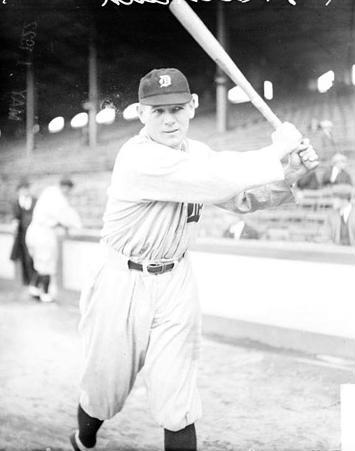
Heilmann circa 1914

In 1921, Heilmann appeared in 149 games, including 145 as the Tigers' starting right fielder. He won his first batting title, compiling a .394 batting average to outpace his manager and teammate Ty Cobb who hit .389. Unofficial figures released in October showed Cobb as the batting champion, but official figures released in December showed Heilmann to be the champion. He was the first right-handed batter to win the American League batting title since Nap Lajoie in 1905. Heilmann also led the American League in 1921 with 237 hits and ranked second behind Babe Ruth with 139 RBIs, 365 total bases, a .606 slugging percentage, 292 times on base, a 7.3 offensive wins above replacement (WAR) rating, and 159 runs created. He also ranked among the league leaders with a .444 on-base percentage (third behind Ruth and Cobb), 43 doubles (third behind Tris Speaker and Ruth), and 76 extra base hits (third behind Ruth and Bob Meusel).

Heilmann's batting average in 1921 was 85 points higher than his 1920 average and 101 points higher than his career average prior to 1921. Some attributed Heilmann's dramatic improvement to the tutelage of Ty Cobb, who took over as the Tigers' manager in 1921. Others attributed Heilmann's improvement to the "live-ball era" that started in 1920 and forced outfielders to spread out and play deeper, allowing more of Heilmann's line drives to fall into the wider gaps. However, Frank G. Menke attributed his improvement to having learned the game, noting that the "lively ball" failed to account for the fact that those who outhit Heilmann from 1914 to 1920 were no longer outhitting him. Menke observed:

There is nothing picturesque, nothing highly colored, nothing bombastic or spectacular about his methods. He is not a grandstander -- not theatrical. And because he isn't, he does not get the acclaim and the plaudits which men, less wonderful, but better showmen, achieve for themselves.

Though primarily a line-drive hitter, Heilmann could also hit for power. His 19 home runs in 1921 ranked fifth in the American League, and he ranked among the league leaders in home runs 11 times. On July 8, 1921, Heilmann hit a home run off "Bullet Joe" Bush that traveled over the center field fence in Detroit and "actually made the patrons gasp in astonishment." Heilmann's home run was widely reported to have traveled 610 feet, eclipsing Babe Ruth's longest home run of 465 feet. Detroit's grounds keeper was more conservative, reporting that no measurement was made, but estimating that it traveled more than 500 feet. In a column published after the 1921 season, Grantland Rice rated Heilmann as the premier scholar in the American League's School of Swat, ahead of Cobb and Ruth.

The entire Tiger lineup hit remarkably well in 1921. In addition to Heilmann and Cobb's 1–2 finish for the batting title, Detroit's third outfielder, Bobby Veach, was also among the league's best at .338. The 1921 Tigers finished the season with a team batting average of .316, the highest in American League history and second highest in major league history. However, true to the baseball adage that good pitching beats good hitting, the 1921 Tigers lacked good pitching and finished in sixth place, 27 games behind the pennant-winning Yankees.

The 1921 season marked the start of a seven-year stretch in which Heilmann compiled a .380 batting average, .452 on-base percentage, .583 slugging percentage, and averaged 116 RBIs, 41 doubles, 11 triples, 15 home runs, and 104 runs scored.

==== Batting style and speed ====
Heilmann was known as a line drive hitter who clubbed the ball harder than any batter of his era with the exception of Babe Ruth. His one major handicap as a player was a lack of speed that led to his being known by the nickname "Slug". He was long known as "one of the slowest men in baseball." Hall of Fame sportswriter Tommy Holmes noted: "Heilmann was never much faster than an ice wagon on the base paths. Without doubt, he is the slowest moving great hitter who ever lived." According to Holmes, Ty Cobb's speed added 50 hits a year to his output, while Heilmann's lack of speed robbed him of infield hits. Sportswriter Harry Grayson later wrote that Heilmann's inability to beat out infield hits was the one thing that kept Heilmann from matching Rogers Hornsby as the greatest right-handed batter in baseball history.

==== 1922 season ====
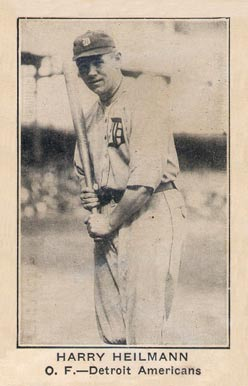
1922 baseball card of Heilmann

In February 1922, Heilmann refused to sign his contract, demanding to be paid $15,000. On March 3, 1922, Heilmann signed a contract for $12,500 with the Tigers, agreeing to report to spring training the following week. His spring training was then interrupted again in late March when he returned to Detroit to be with his wife for the birth of their son on March 28, 1922.

By late June, Heilmann was batting .387 and battling George Sisler for the American League batting championship. On August 26, 1922, Heilman's season came to an end when he sustained a complete break of his collarbone when he crashed into Frank Brower while trying to beat out an infield hit. Heilmann had to have his collarbone rebroken and reset, and it was then discovered that Heilmann had also broken his shoulder. The injuries were so severe that Heilmann remained hospitalized until a week before the end of the season, and even after leaving the hospital, he feared he might never play again. Despite missing the last five weeks of the season, Heilmann hit a career-high 21 home runs, fourth in the American League, and also ranked among the league leaders with a .356 batting average (fourth), a .432 on-base percentage (fifth) and a .598 slugging percentage (fourth).

==== 1923 season ====
In January 1923, while preparing for spring training and recuperating from his collar and shoulder injuries, Heilmann took up handball and quickly developed a reputation as one of the best players in the country. Heilmann's efforts at handball also helped him shed excess weight, reporting in spring training at 200 pounds, 30 pounds less than he had reported in 1922.

During the 1923 season, Heilmann won his second batting title, hitting .403 for the season, edging out Babe Ruth who hit .393. Heilmann in 1923 became the fourth American League player to hit .400 or more for a season, joining Ty Cobb, Nap Lajoie and George Sisler. Only one other American League player, Ted Williams in 1941, has accomplished the feat since 1923.

In addition to winning the 1923 batting crown, Heilmann had one of his best seasons as a slugger. He finished second to Ruth in on-base percentage (.481), slugging percentage (.632) and wins above replacement (9.3). He also ranked among the American League leaders with 115 RBIs (third), 211 hits (third), 18 home runs (third), 121 runs scored (fourth), 331 total bases (fourth), 44 doubles (fourth), and 73 extra base hits (fourth). Despite hitting over .400, he finished third in the 1923 American League Most Valuable Player voting behind Ruth and Eddie Collins.

Heilmann in 1923 denied Ruth a Major League Baseball Triple Crown for the second time; Ruth led the league in home runs and RBIs in both 1921 and 1923, but was edged out in batting average in both years by Heilmann. In 1926, another Tiger, Heinie Manush, won the batting title to deny Ruth the triple crown a third time. Heilmann worked as a life insurance agent during the off-season in the 1920s. On October 16, 1923, after Ruth had received his World Series winner's share‚ Heilmann‚ who was friends with Ruth despite having beaten him for the batting title‚ sold Ruth a $50‚000 life insurance policy.

==== 1924 season ====
In 1924, Heilmann's batting average dropped by 56 points to .346, which ranked sixth in the American League. Despite the "slump" in batting average, Heilmann led the league with 45 doubles and ranked second behind Babe Ruth with a .533 slugging percentage, a 6.4 wins above replacement rating among position players, and 130 runs created. He also ranked among the league leaders with 304 total bases (third), 71 extra base hits (third), 16 triples (third), 107 runs scored (fourth), 278 times on base (fourth), a .428 on-base percentage (fifth), and 114 RBIs (fifth). He appeared in 145 games as the Tigers' starting right fielder in 1924 and had his best defensive season, leading the league with 31 outfield assists; he never had more than 18 in any other season. He also led the league's right fielders with 263 putouts. Heilmann finished ninth in the voting for the 1924 American League Most Valuable Player award.

==== 1925 season ====
In 1925, Heilmann appeared in 150 games, 147 as Detroit's starting right fielder, and won his third batting title, this time in a close race with Tris Speaker. Going into the final day of the season, Heilmann trailed Speaker and needed a strong performance to pass him. On the last day, the Tigers played a doubleheader against the St. Louis Browns, and Heilmann had six hits, including a home run, in nine at bats. Heilmann finished with a .393 average, four points higher than Speaker. He was again among the American League leaders in most offensive categories, with 293 times on base (first), a 7.1 offensive wins above replacement rating (first), 134 RBIs (tied for first), 225 hits (third), a .457 on-base percentage (fourth), 326 total bases (fourth), a .569 slugging percentage (fifth), 40 doubles (fifth), and 64 extra base hits (fifth). Despite his accomplishments, the 1925 American League MVP award went to Roger Peckinpaugh, who hit almost 100 points below Heilmann and had 70 fewer RBIs than Heilmann but whose Senators repeated as pennant winners.

==== 1926 season ====
In 1926, Heilmann appeared in 141 games, 133 as the Tigers' starting right fielder, and compiled a .367 batting average, .445 on-base percentage, and .534 slugging percentage. Heilmann ranked fourth in batting average in the American League, and the Detroit outfield took three of the top four spots in the batting race, as center fielder Heinie Manush won the batting crown with a .378 average, and left fielder Bob Fothergill finished third with a .367 average. Heilmann's .445 on-base percentage was second best in the American League, and he once again tallied more than 100 RBIs (101) and finished fifth in American League MVP voting. On August 8, 1926, the Tigers held a Harry Heilmann Day at which Detroit Mayor John W. Smith presented Heilmann with a $5,000 Cadillac sports sedan, donated by Lawrence Fisher of Fisher Body, in front of a crowd of 40,000 spectators at Briggs Field.

==== 1927 season ====
In 1927, Heilmann again appeared in 141 games, 135 as the starter in right field. He won his fourth and final batting crown with a .398 batting average in a close race with Al Simmons who hit .392. On August 13, Simmons led Heilmann by 26 points, .393 to .367, but Heilmann took the lead after totaling 27 hits in 11 games in the latter half of August. He then slumped in early September to fall behind Simmons and trailed by one point going into the last day of the season. On the final day of the season, in a doubleheader at Cleveland, Heilmann had seven hits in nine at bats, including two home runs and three doubles, to add seven points to his average and overtake Simmons to win the batting championship. He also ranked among the league leaders with a .475 on-base percentage (second), 120 RBIs (third), 201 hits (third), 50 doubles (third), 73 extra base hits (third), .616 slugging percentage (fourth), 311 total bases (fourth) and 106 runs scored (fifth). Despite winning his fourth batting title, Heilmann still finished second in the American League MVP voting, this time behind Lou Gehrig of the Murderers' Row 1927 Yankees.

When a reporter reminded him that he had won batting titles every odd-numbered year from 1921 to 1927, Heilmann replied: "Mr. Navin [Detroit owner] gives me contracts on a two-year basis. I always bear down real hard when a new contract is coming up."

==== 1928 and 1929 seasons ====
In 1928, Heilmann appeared in 151 games for the Tigers, 125 as the team's starting right fielder and 24 as the starting first baseman. He compiled a .328 batting average, 70 points lower than his 1927 average of .398, but still seventh best in the American League. He also ranked among the American League leaders with 107 RBIs (fifth), 62 extra base hits (fifth), 283 total bases (fifth), 14 home runs (sixth), a .507 slugging percentage (eighth), 183 hits (eighth), and 38 doubles (eighth).

In 1929, Heilmann was suspended in the spring for "indifferent training" and then finished the season on the bench. He ended up appearing in 125 games, 111 as the team's starting right fielder, and compiled a .344 batting average, ninth best in the American League. He again ranked among the league leaders with 120 RBIs (fifth), a .565 slugging percentage (seventh), 41 doubles (seventh), and a .412 on-base percentage (ninth).

=== Cincinnati Reds ===
In October 1929, the Tigers offered Heilmann on waivers to the other American League teams, but he went unclaimed, as no team was willing to pay the waiver price of $7,500. He was then sold by the Tigers to the Cincinnati Reds for a sum reported to be somewhat under $25,000. During the 1930 season, Heilmann appeared in 142 games with the Reds, 106 as the team's starting right fielder and 19 at first base. He compiled a .333 batting average and .416 on-base percentage, the highest on the Cincinnati club in 1930. He also totaled 68 extra base hits, 19 home runs and 91 RBIs and ranked among the National League leaders with 43 doubles (seventh) and 64 bases on balls (eighth). While not previously known for his fielding, his 2.78 range factor in 1930 remains the second highest in major league history for a right fielder.

In March 1931, Heilmann was incapacitated by arthritis in his right wrist. The arthritis was so severe that he was hospitalized for a time in the spring. He ended up missing the entire 1931 season.

In January 1932, Heilmann was reported by the Reds to be in "great shape". He trained himself in Hot Springs and reported in late February that he believed himself ready. However, he appeared in only 15 games for the Reds, primarily as a pinch hitter and in five games as the team's starting first baseman. He compiled a .258 batting average in 31 at bats and appeared in his last major league game on May 31, 1932. He was released by the Reds on June 6, 1932. It was reported at the time that his arthritic wrist had "lost its snap, and the power of his bat and throwing arm was gone."

=== Career statistics ===
Years	G	AB	R	H	2B	3B	HR	RBI	TB	SB	BB	AVG	OBP	SLG	OPS	FLD%
17	2147	7787	1291	2660	542	151	183	1543	4053	113	856	.342	.410	.520	.930	.975

== Post-baseball career ==
During his time spent in Detroit with the Tigers, Heilmann would briefly become a franchise owner for the Brooklyn Arcadians in the original American Basketball League before it was forced to fold operations during its second season of existence for the Naismith Basketball Hall of Fame-based Original Celtics franchise. He also worked in the insurance business in Cincinnati while he played for the Reds. After retiring from baseball in 1932, Heilmann returned to Detroit and continued there in the insurance business. He also ran in 1933 for the office of Detroit City Treasurer, losing decisively to Charles L. Williams by a margin of 138,478 votes for Williams to 68,695 for Heilmann. He also played sandlot baseball briefly for the Tool Shop team in the Detroit Amateur Baseball Federation. On June 4, 1933, a crowd of more than 20,000 spectators watched Heilmann's return to baseball, as Heilmann had an RBI single in the first inning and made a "big league catch" in right field before a thunderstorm forced the cancellation of the game in the second inning. After a few games with Tool Shop, Heilmann organized his own team, known as Harry Heilmann's All-Stars and consisting of former major league players, including Bobby Veach, Oscar Stanage, "Leaping Mike" Menosky, Marty Kavanagh, and Frank Fuller, which played games throughout Michigan and Ohio in July, August and September 1933, including a game against an African-American team from Akron.

=== Broadcasting ===
In 1934, Heilman was hired by WXYZ to handle the play-by-play responsibility on broadcasts of Detroit Tigers games for the Michigan Radio Network. At the start of the 1934 season, he was paired with Harold True, but became a solo broadcaster by the end of the season and thereafter. During the Tigers' 1935 championship season, Heilmann broadcast all home games for the Tigers, while out-of-town games were relayed by telegraph with play-by-play being read by Bob Longstreet from the WXYZ studio in the Maccabees Building. In the fall of 1934, Heilmann also began broadcasting a football highlights show on Saturday evenings on the WXYZ and the Michigan Radio Network. In 1936, he also broadcast out-of-town Tigers games on CKLW radio. He also began broadcasting a sports interview show on WXYZ in 1936. In 1937, Heilmann further expanded his radio responsibilities with a daily recap of the day's baseball games, broadcast at 5:30 p.m. on WXYZ. In 1938, he continued his broadcasts of Tigers home and out-of-town games on WXYZ, and added a 12:45 p.m. interview show with the fan on the street, broadcast Monday through Saturday on WXYZ.

As his popularity grew, Heilmann expanded outside the sports realm in 1939 with a new interview program co-hosted with WXYZ staff announcer John (Johnny) Slagle. The program was titled "Town Meeting" and was broadcast at 12:45 p.m. on Mondays, Wednesdays and Fridays on WXYZ and the Michigan Radio Network. In the fall of 1939, Heilmann also joined Carl Gensel on broadcasts of Michigan State Spartans football games.

Through the Tigers' 1942 season, Heilmann was part of an unusual broadcasting arrangement. His WXYZ/Michigan Radio Network broadcasts were carried on affiliate stations throughout the state of Michigan, while Ty Tyson called the games separately on WWJ in Detroit. In the years of competing broadcasts, it took some time for Heilmann to develop a following. As one Detroit Free Press reporter later noted:

A raspy voice, an Eastern accent and the contrast with Tyson's polished delivery irritated some who listened to Harry. There was no such thing as a Tiger fan who liked both announcers — you were either a Tyson fan or a Heilmann fan, never both.

In 1943, the Tigers gave exclusive broadcast rights to WXYZ, making Heilmann the team's sole radio voice both in Detroit and throughout Michigan. During his tenure as a Tigers announcer, he called the American League pennant-winning teams of 1940 and 1945.

Heilmann was known for his storytelling ability and for his in-depth knowledge of baseball. In 1951, Detroit Free Press sports editor Lyall Smith described his broadcasting style:

In an era when radiomen frequently went into hysterics and fabricated spine-tingling situations, Harry was content to inform his listeners merely what actually happened on the diamond. These factual accounts were interspersed with tips on inside baseball and stories from his vast fund of diamond lore.

Baseball historian Marc Okkonen grew up listening to Heilmann's broadcasts and later recalled Heilmann's tendency to drop the letter "r" from the end of words, referring to Hal Newhouser as "Newhousa" and Bob Feller as "Fellah". He also recalled that one of Heilmann's sponsors was a fly spray called Bugaboo; when an outfielder would catch a fly ball, Heilmann would proclaim, "Bugaboo! Another dead fly!" Okkonenen also recalled Heilmann's most memorable line, uttered after outstanding plays, when he would remain silent to emphasize the crowd noise and say, "Listen ... to the voice of baseball."

In March 1946, Heilmann sustained five broken ribs and a broken chest bone in an automobile accident in Florida during spring training. Despite the injuries, he broadcast the Tigers games from opening day forward during the 1946 season.

On September 11, 1948, the Tigers held a Harry Heilmann Day at Briggs Stadium. He was honored between games of a double-header and presented with a solid gold pass for all games played at Briggs Stadium.

== Death ==
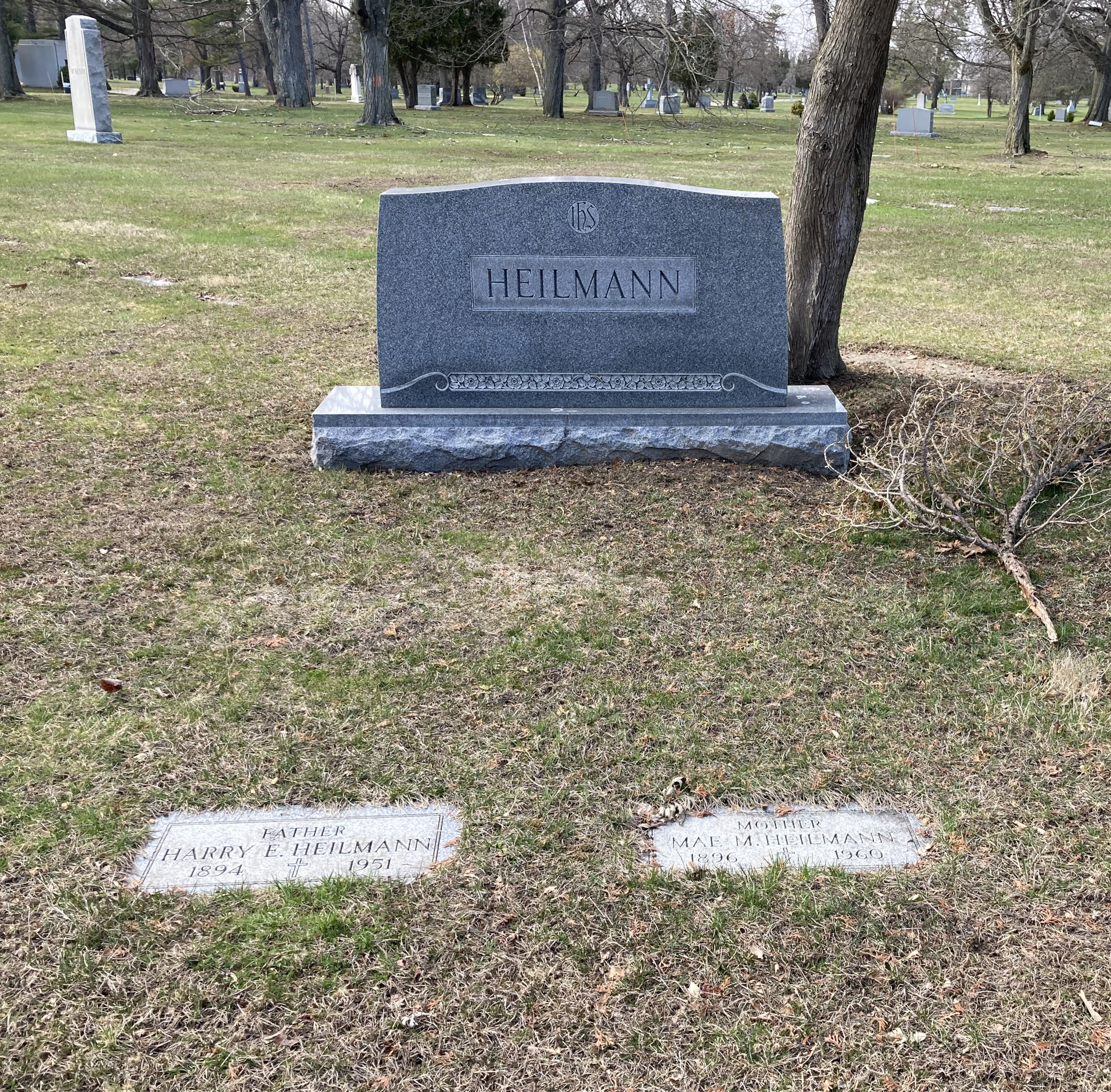
Heilmann's grave at Holy Sepulchre Cemetery

Heilmann was ill for much of the winter after the 1950 season. On March 14, 1951, he collapsed at the Tigers' spring training camp in Lakeland, Florida. He was hospitalized at Morrell Hospital in Lakeland, and the Detroit Free Press reported two days later that he was in critical condition with a lung condition. At the end of March, after two weeks in the Lakeland hospital, the Tigers' owner Walter O. Briggs flew Heilmann back to Detroit on his private plane. Heilmann was taken by ambulance from the airport to Henry Ford Hospital, where he remained hospitalized. He remained hospitalized through the month of April, and Ty Tyson was selected to fill in for Heilmann on Tiger broadcasts during Heilmann's illness. Heilmann was released from the hospital and returned home in May 1951. On June 1, 1951, he was greeted warmly by the crowd when he and his wife attended a game at Briggs Stadium. He also returned briefly to the Tiger broadcasts in early June, sharing the duties with Tyson and Paul Williams.

Heilmann was hospitalized again at Henry Ford Hospital in Detroit on June 24 as his condition worsened, and he died there on July 9, 1951. It was only after his death that it was disclosed that the nature of his illness was lung cancer. Detroit mayor Albert Cobo recalled that Heilmann's radio broadcasts made him "almost a member of the family" to Detroiters. Team owner Walter Briggs recalled Heilmann as one of his closest friends and said, "I doubt whether the death of any other person in the State of Michigan could cause more genuine regret."

The 1951 Major League Baseball All-Star Game was played in Detroit on the day after Heilmann died and began with a moment of silence in his honor. Heilmann's funeral mass was celebrated by Father Charles Coughlin at the Shrine of the Little Flower in Royal Oak, Michigan. He was buried at the Holy Sepulchre Cemetery in Southfield, Michigan.

== Career accomplishments and legacy ==
Over the course of his major league career, Heilmann appeared in 2,147 games, including 1,525 games as a right fielder and 448 as a first baseman. He compiled a career batting average of .342 with a .410 on-base percentage and a .520 slugging percentage. Heilmann's notable accomplishments include the following:

- Heilmann's .342 batting average ranks 12th in major league history. Among right-handed batters, his average ranks third behind only Rogers Hornsby and Ed Delahanty. His .410 on-base percentage ranks 35th in major league history, and his .520 slugging percentage ranks 58th.
- Heilmann remains one of only six players in American League history to hit .400 for a season. The others are Nap Lajoie, Shoeless Joe Jackson, Ty Cobb, George Sisler, and Ted Williams. Heilmann accomplished the feat in 1923 with a .403 batting average.
- He is one of six players to have won four or more American League batting titles. The others are Ty Cobb (twelve), Rod Carew (seven), Ted Williams (six), Wade Boggs (five), and Miguel Cabrera (four).
- At the time of his retirement in 1932, his 542 doubles ranked sixth in major league history, and his 1,543 RBIs ranked eighth in major league history.
- Heilmann's 164 home runs while playing for Detroit was a club record when he was sold to the Reds at the end of the 1929 season; his record was broken in 1938 by Hank Greenberg.

In the weeks prior to Heilmann's death, Ty Cobb led a campaign, supported by Arthur Daley of The New York Times and H. G. Salsinger of The Detroit News, to hold a special election so that Heilmann could be inducted into the Baseball Hall of Fame before his death. Heilmann had received 87 of 167 ballots cast (52.1%) in 1950 and 153 of 226 ballots cast (67.7%) in 1951, below the 75% threshold. Heilmann died before action could be taken on the proposed special election, but on January 31, 1952, the National Baseball Hall of Fame announced that Heilmann would be inducted that summer, having garnered 203 of the 234 (86.75%) votes cast. He was represented by his widow at the induction ceremony in July 1952.

Heilmann has continued to be recognized as one of the greatest players in the history of the game. Significant honors include the following:

- In 1969, Heilmann was selected in fan voting as one of the three outfielders (Ty Cobb and Al Kaline were the others) on the all time Detroit Tigers team.
- In 1994, fellow Hall of Fame slugger Ted Williams rated Heilmann as the 17th best overall hitter of all time.
- In 1999, Heilmann was ranked 54th on The Sporting News list of 100 Greatest Baseball Players.
- In 1999, he was selected as one of the 100 greatest players as part of the voting process for Major League Baseball's All-Century Team.

== See also ==
- List of Major League Baseball batting champions
- List of Major League Baseball annual doubles leaders
- List of Major League Baseball doubles records
- List of Major League Baseball career doubles leaders
- List of Major League Baseball career triples leaders
- List of Major League Baseball career hits leaders
- List of Major League Baseball career runs scored leaders
- List of Major League Baseball career runs batted in leaders
- List of Major League Baseball career total bases leaders
