= Del Pratt =

American football and baseball player (1888–1977)

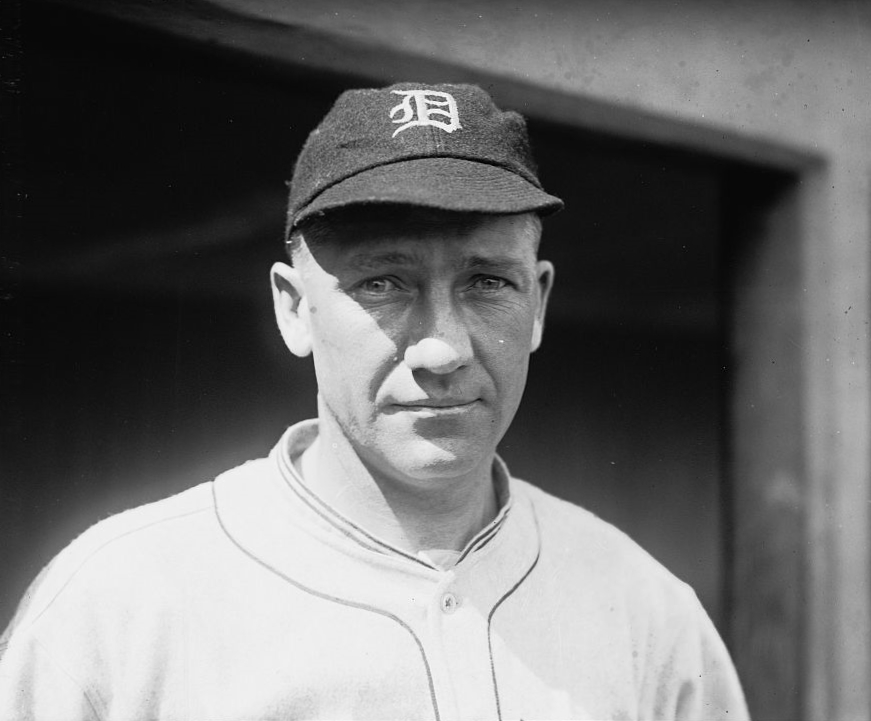
- Second baseman
- Born: January 10, 1888; Walhalla, South Carolina, U.S.
- Died: September 30, 1977 (aged 89); Texas City, Texas, U.S.
- Batted: Right Threw: Right

MLB debut
- April 11, 1912, for the St. Louis Browns

Last MLB appearance
- September 29, 1924, for the Detroit Tigers

MLB statistics
- Batting average: .292
- Home runs: 43
- Runs batted in: 979
- Stats at Baseball Reference

Teams
- St. Louis Browns (1912–1917); New York Yankees (1918–1920); Boston Red Sox (1921–1922); Detroit Tigers (1923–1924)

Career highlights and awards
- AL RBI leader (1916)

Derrill Burnham "Del" Pratt (January 10, 1888 – September 30, 1977) was an American professional baseball player and college football player and coach. He played football as a halfback the University of Alabama and was the head football coach at Southern University—later merged into Birmingham–Southern College—for one season, in 1910. Pratt signed with the St. Louis Browns of Major League Baseball (MLB) in 1912. He was a star second baseman in the American League for over a decade, but also saw some action at first base, shortstop, third base, and the outfield.

== Baseball career ==
In his rookie season, in 1912, Pratt batted .302 for the Browns. In 1916 he led the American League with 103 RBIs.

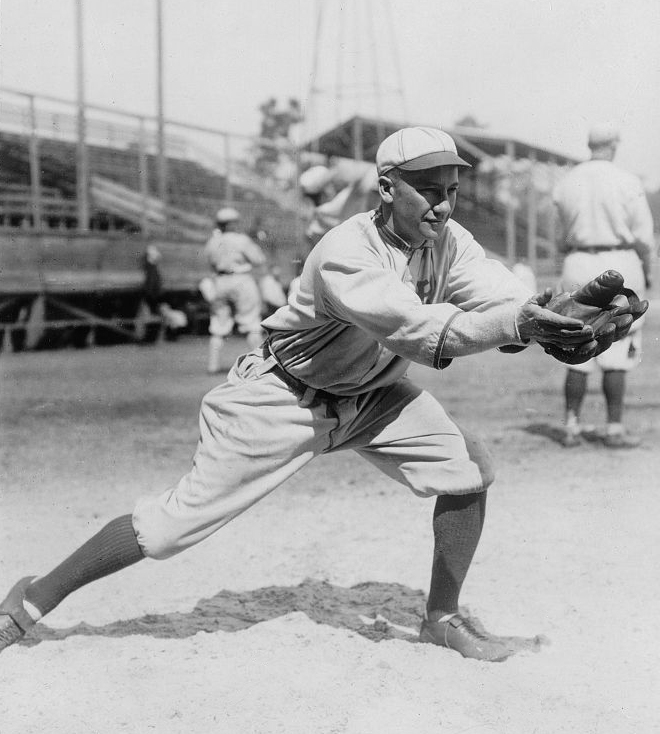
Pratt, warming up, 1913

In 1917, the Browns were struggling. Owner Phil Ball accused some of the players of intentionally playing poorly so that they could be traded. Ball said, "Every $1,000 I lose on the Browns this season will cost the ballplayers $100. Salaries will be cut next season." Pratt was offended. He and teammate Doc Lavan sued Ball for slander. The Sporting News went so far as to call Pratt the Browns' Trotsky. The suit was eventually settled in 1918, and Pratt was traded to the New York Yankees.

After the 1920 season, the Yankees traded Pratt to the Boston Red Sox for Waite Hoyt, but he decided to retire. He was hired as the University of Michigan baseball coach to replace Carl Lundgren (with a recommendation from Branch Rickey) and served as an assistant football coach and freshman basketball coach. He began preparing the 1921 team, but the Red Sox coaxed him out of retirement before the first game of the season. Upon his return to the Sox in 1921, Pratt batted over .300. He ended his career with the Detroit Tigers.

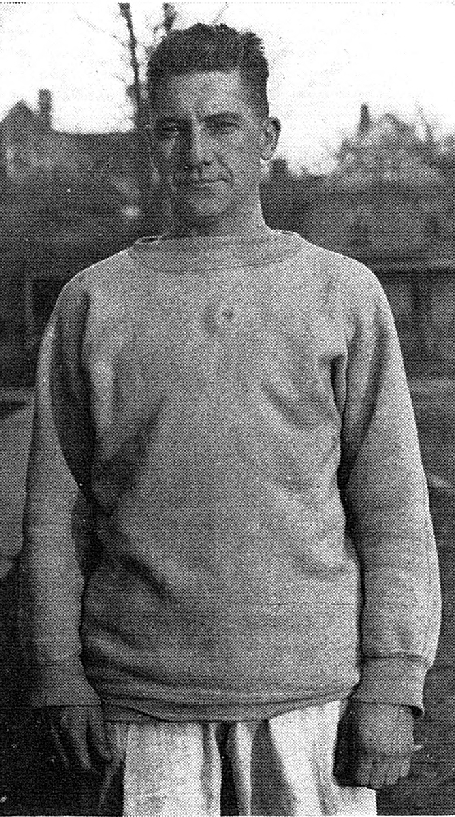
Pratt as an assistant football coach at the University of Michigan, 1920

His career batting average was .292 over twelve seasons, with an on-base percentage of .345. He had a total of 979 RBIs and 857 runs scored. Pratt hit better than .300 six times.

== Death ==
Pratt died in Texas City, Texas, on September 30, 1977, at age 89.

== See also ==
- List of Major League Baseball career triples leaders
- List of Major League Baseball career stolen bases leaders
- List of Major League Baseball annual runs batted in leaders
