= Oakland Ballpark =

Scrapped baseball stadium in Oakland, California

Howard Terminal Ballpark
- Artist's rendering of Howard Terminal Ballpark

- Location in Oakland Location in California Location in the United States
- Address: 1 Market Street
- Location: Oakland, California, U.S.
- Coordinates: 37°47′44.7″N 122°17′0.03″W
- Operator: Oakland Athletics
- Capacity: 34,000
- Surface: Grass
- Public transit: Amtrak: Oakland – Jack London Square; Gondola from Downtown (planned); AC Transit: 12, 72, 72M, 72R, Broadway Shuttle; San Francisco Bay Ferry: Oakland Ferry Terminal

Construction
- Cost: US$500 million+ ($657 million in 2025 dollars)
- Architect: Bjarke Ingels Group

Tenant
- Oakland Athletics (MLB)

Howard Terminal Ballpark was a scrapped baseball stadium to be built in the Jack London Square neighborhood of Oakland, California. If approved and constructed, it would have served as the new home stadium of the Oakland Athletics of Major League Baseball (MLB), replacing the Oakland Coliseum. The 34,000-seat stadium was the last of several proposals to keep the Athletics in Oakland. The site is currently a parcel of land (previously used as a marine terminal for container cargo operations) owned by the Port of Oakland. After securing the site, the Athletics planned to have the stadium built and operational after the team's lease expired at the Oakland Coliseum in 2024.

== Ballpark timeline ==
- 2001 – The Uptown site for a new ballpark is propose but rejected by then-Oakland mayor Jerry Brown. The City of Oakland suggests a site near the Oakland Estuary.
- 2005 – The 66th Avenue site is considered
- 2006 – Cisco Field plan is announced in Fremont
- 2009 – Fremont location is abandoned after public resistance.
- 2010 – City of Oakland proposes waterfront site near Jack London Square at Victory Court for a new ballpark
- 2011 – City tables the Victory Court site in favor of a proposed three-venue development at the Coliseum site titled Coliseum City
- 2012 – Cisco Field in San Jose is announced, the San Francisco Giants object due to territorial rights
- 2014 – The A's began talks with an architect to build a baseball-only stadium at the Coliseum site
- 2015 – The United States Supreme Court declines to hear a case seeking to enable a move to San Jose
- 2016 – The team reveals they will choose between the Port of Oakland, Coliseum site, and the Peralta area for a new stadium
- 2017 – The team chooses Peralta area of Oakland near Laney College, is rejected by college board and surrounding Chinatown neighbors
- 2018 – The team proposes to buy the Coliseum site outright in exchange for paying off the remaining $135 million debt owed by the City of Oakland and Alameda County
- 2018 – The team chooses Port of Oakland/Howard Terminal site and releases renderings
- 2020 – The timeline for Howard Terminal ballpark is reportedly impacted by the COVID-19 pandemic
- 2021 – Major League Baseball, concerned with the slow progress on the Howard Terminal project, allows the A's to explore options outside of Oakland. As a result, non-binding agreements were made for the Howard Terminal ballpark project by the City of Oakland and Alameda County.
- 2022 – The Howard Terminal ballpark project's Environmental Impact Report (EIR) is certified by the City of Oakland. Subsequently, the San Francisco Bay Conservation and Development Commission (BCDC) voted to remove Howard Terminal as port priority use
- 2023 — After the Athletics acquire a parcel of land for a new stadium in Las Vegas, Nevada, with plans to move, the City of Oakland ceases negotiations with the Athletics over the stadium's development, ending the project.

== Uptown Oakland and Oakland Estuary (2001) ==
The first of the proposed new ballpark sites was a location in Uptown Oakland. In a 2001 study, Populous (formerly HOK Sport) had suggested this location as the prime site for a ballpark. However, plans to build a park there were dismissed by then-Oakland Mayor Jerry Brown due to the concern of the ballpark ruining the housing development of the neighborhood. Brown opted to sell the site to a condominium builder to whom he allegedly had ties. The City of Oakland also considered a site near the Oakland Estuary for a stadium. However, the A's showed no interest in the site due to lack of public transit access. Additionally, much of that land had already been sold to a condominium developer.

== 66th Avenue (2005) ==
Then-Oakland Athletics owner Lewis Wolff presented his vision for the team's venue to the Oakland-Alameda County Coliseum Authority on August 12, 2005. The ballpark he proposed would have been on 66th Avenue just north of the Coliseum. The stadium would have been built on what is currently zoned industrial land and would have included a Ballpark Village which would have included shops and either a hotel or apartment building in one of the outfield walls of the park.

== Victory Court and Coliseum City (2010) ==
On November 16, 2010, the City of Oakland proposed a waterfront site in the Jack London Square area for a new A's ballpark. The site, called Victory Court, was near the Lake Merritt Channel along the Oakland Estuary. The city conducted an environmental impact report for the Victory Court site and informed Major League Baseball of its decision. The city began accepting public comment on the ballpark EIR at the December 1 Planning Commission meeting held at Oakland City Hall. By the end of 2011, the city had tabled the Victory Court site in favor of a proposed three-venue development at the Coliseum site titled Coliseum City.

== Cisco Field ==
=== Fremont (2006) ===
In April 2006, Lewis Wolff took his Ballpark Village proposal to Fremont, a city 26.5 miles (42.65 km) southeast of Oakland, where a large 143-acre (0.6 km^{2}) parcel of land was available just north of Mission Boulevard and south of Auto Mall Parkway off Interstate 880 and across from Pacific Commons. The land was owned by the real estate firm Prologis and leased to Cisco Systems. A formal press conference to announce the existence of Wolff's ballpark proposal of Cisco Field was held on November 14, 2006. The plan would be to build a 32,000 to 35,000 capacity stadium on the parcel of land in addition to adding housing and shops. Bud Selig, commissioner of Major League Baseball and John Chambers, the CEO of Cisco Systems along with Wolff were in attendance.

The proposal of the ballpark encountered problems such as construction delays, lack of public transportation, and Fremont residents voicing concerns of traffic congestion, noise, and pollution. As a result, this led to protests on February 5, 2009, at the street outside Weibel Elementary School at 6:30 p.m. holding up anti-A's signs and chanting “No Stadium”, then to Wolff officially ending the ballpark search in Fremont on February 24, 2009.

=== San Jose (2012) ===
In 2012, it was proposed that Cisco Field be constructed in Downtown San Jose immediately adjacent to SAP Center and San Jose Diridon Station at the corner of Montgomery Street and Park Avenue. For the A's to have moved to San Jose, either the San Francisco Giants would have had to rescind their territorial rights on the area, or at least 23 of the 30 MLB owners would have had to vote in the A's favor and force San Francisco to give up their territorial claim to Santa Clara County. Lew Wolff stated, "My goal and desire for the organization is to determine a way to keep the team in Northern California." The Redevelopment Agency of the City of San Jose had been acquiring the properties needed at the Diridon South site. The available land, only 12–14 acres (4.9–5.7 ha), would have given rise to a very intimate stadium. As a result of its small size, it was speculated that it would have been very hitter-friendly.

The Giants repeatedly refused to cede their territorial rights to the San Jose area (which had been yielded by the A's in the early 1990s when the Giants had been in danger of moving to Tampa Bay; previously, the teams had shared the South Bay), although the team is open to sharing Oracle Park with the A's on a temporary basis if the A's have plans for a permanent stadium in the works.

In August 2012, Commissioner Bud Selig's Blue Ribbon committee, which had been implemented to study ballpark locations for the Athletics, met with both Oakland and San Jose officials. At the Oakland meeting, the committee was met with a proposal for a ballpark on the site of Howard Terminal, a container terminal on the Oakland waterfront near Jack London Square owned by the Port of Oakland. Wolff stated the site "has no ability to be implemented for a ballpark." Major League Baseball said it was their preferred location for a new ballpark in Oakland, and later formed a plan to develop the location.

On October 5, 2015, the United States Supreme Court rejected San Jose's bid on the Athletics.

== Back to Oakland ==
On June 25, 2014, the Athletics reached a 10-year lease agreement with the Oakland–Alameda County Coliseum Authority to stay at the Coliseum. Bud Selig commended both sides for reaching a deal on a lease extension, while offering, "I continue to believe that the Athletics need a new facility and am fully supportive of the club's view that the best site in Oakland is the Coliseum site." On July 16, 2014, the extension was officially approved.

On August 6, 2014, the A's commenced talks with a possible architect to build a baseball-only stadium at the Coliseum site, according to Wolff. It was reported in early 2015 that the Raiders and team owner Mark Davis met with Wolff in an effort to create a stadium solution where two separate stadiums (one for the Raiders and one for the Athletics) would have been built on the Coliseum site. The Athletics balked at the deal.

=== Ownership change (2016) ===
In 2016, Lewis Wolff resigned as the majority owner of the team. John J. Fisher then took over as majority owner. Fisher appointed Dave Kaval as team president and head of the stadium project. Around the same time, the Raiders announced their move to Las Vegas in 2020. Also, the Golden State Warriors moved to Chase Center in San Francisco in September 2019. This left the Athletics as the last major league professional sports team in Oakland. The team revealed three stadium location options: the current Coliseum site, the Peralta area near Laney College, and Howard Terminal at Jack London Square.

=== Peralta site (2017) ===
After a comprehensive study of three proposed ballpark sites (Coliseum site, Howard Terminal, and Peralta Community College Headquarters District), the A's ownership determined that the best potential site to fit the needs of the A's and create the most community partnership opportunities and benefits was the Peralta site. The team announced that the Peralta site would be the preferred choice for the A's new ballpark on September 13, 2017. The area is located between Lake Merritt and I-880 where there are warehouses, parking lots and administrative offices for the Peralta Community College District.

Opposition to the project included members of the Peralta Federation of Teachers, select student and facility groups of neighboring Laney College and a local coalition of organizations led by the Asian Pacific Environmental Network (APEN). After several months of preliminary discussions amongst the A's and the Peralta Community College's Office of the Chancellor Jowel Laguerre, Chancellor of Peralta Community College District, a statement was issued by the Chancellor indicating that he had been instructed to "discontinue planning" for the ballpark after a closed session meeting of the Peralta Community College District Board of Trustees on the evening of December 5, 2017.

=== Ballpark at Howard Terminal proposal (2018–2023) ===
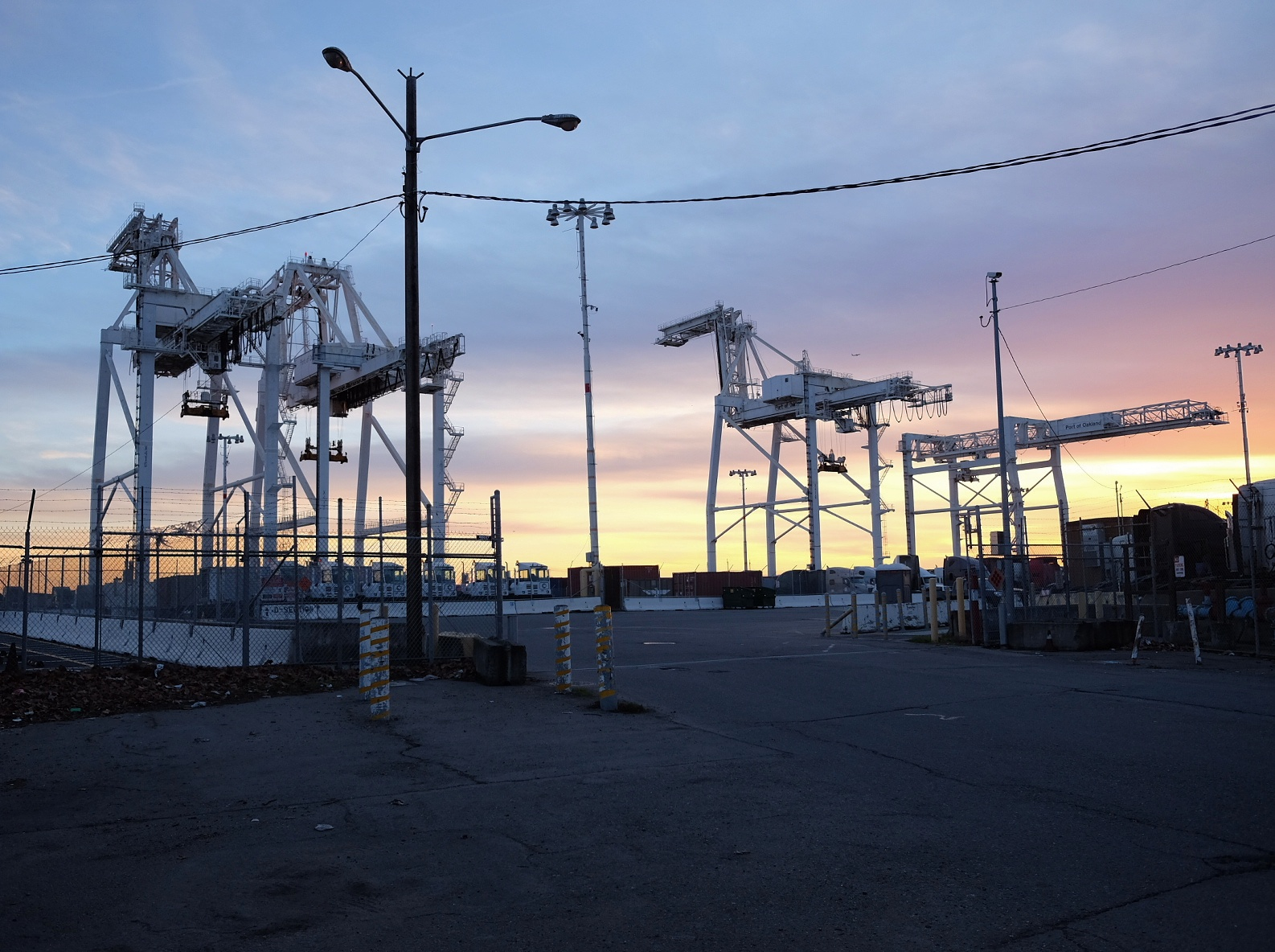
Howard Terminal in 2018

In November 2018, a plan for a "jewel box" design for the stadium at Howard Terminal met with a "tepid welcome," with the next version in February 2019 showing a "smoother and more circular stadium." At the time, the A's still had not acquired Howard Terminal.

The A's proposed plan was to build a privately financed, 34,000-seat ballpark at Howard Terminal, including fixed seats and general admission experience areas. The ballpark was to feature an elevated park that wraps and frames the bowl, coming down to meet the waterfront and a promenade called Athletics Way. The proposed ballpark was intended to create a new waterfront district with a mixture of real estate, including affordable housing, offices, restaurants, retail, small business space, parks, and public gathering spaces. Bjarke Ingels Group (BIG) was hired as the lead designer in developing plans for both the stadium and the surrounding development around the new ballpark. It was BIG's first Major League Baseball stadium commission. A revised design by BIG came out in February 2019, retaining its rooftop park with community access and developing "3.3 million square feet of housing, 1.5 million square feet of commercial and office space, a hotel and a performance center in the area surrounding the stadium."

Located near Downtown Oakland, the Charles P. Howard Terminal is west of Jack London Square and is adjacent to railroad tracks and large industrial facilities. The 55-acre (22 ha) waterfront property is currently owned by the Port of Oakland. Howard Terminal has not been used by a cargo vessel since 2013. On April 26, 2018, the Port of Oakland commissioners voted 6–0 unanimously to enter in to a one-year agreement to negotiate exclusively with the Oakland A's. This agreement allowed the A's to pay the Port $100,000 to study economic feasibility and environmental, transportation and accessibility issues. A similar agreement with the A's regarding the Coliseum site was also agreed upon with the city on May 16, 2017.

By March 2019, the MLB had completed an Environmental Impact Report (EIR) for the Howard Terminal ballpark proposal. On February 22, 2019, the Oakland A's announced a partnership with the West Oakland Environmental Indicators Project (WOEIP) to enhance the long-term sustainability of the neighborhoods of West Oakland and improve the quality of life for local residents. The partnership was part of a series of environmentally focused plans being promoted by the A's, including committing to LEED gold standard of design with the ballpark; a target of reducing car trips to the new ballpark by 20%; achieving net zero emissions; possibly building an electrically powered gondola that connects the ballpark to mass transit; and adding protections to the site in anticipation of future sea level rise caused by climate change. The A's were also working with the City of Oakland on a race and equity analysis to ensure the project produces community benefits for Oakland residents.

Union Pacific, according to the San Francisco Chronicle, voiced concerns over the Howard Terminal as the ballpark's location in April 2019, due to issues of safety concerning the active train tracks on one side of the site. Maritime officials had also voiced concerns that bright lights from the stadium might interfere with the Inner Harbor's shipping traffic at night. On May 11, 2019, the Alameda Labor Council, AFL–CIO, voted to support the Oakland A's efforts to build a new ballpark at Howard Terminal. The Council expressed strong support for the project given its potential to provide significant economic benefits for working families throughout the East Bay. According to a report issued by the Bay Area Council Economic Institute, the privately financed ballpark project would create approximately 2,000 construction jobs and even more permanent jobs would be generated by the ongoing operation of the ballpark. In addition to the A's ballpark project at Howard Terminal, the council also officially endorsed the A's redevelopment project at the Coliseum site, provided it also includes community benefits.

=== Coliseum redevelopment ===
As part of the ballpark plan, the Athletics committed to redevelopment of the Coliseum site, which was owned jointly by the City of Oakland and Alameda County. In March 2018, the A's sent a letter to the City of Oakland proposing to purchase the entire Coliseum property, including Oakland Arena and surrounding parking lots, and develop it into a new ballpark and ballpark village in exchange for paying off $135 million of debt owed on the property by the City of Oakland and Alameda County. On April 23, 2019, the Alameda County Board of Supervisors voted 5–0 to approve the term sheet between the County and the Oakland Athletics providing for the possible purchase by the A's of the county's 50% interest in the Oakland Alameda County Coliseum Complex for $85 million. On September 27, 2019, the Oakland City Council filed a lawsuit against Alameda County over the pending sale of the Coliseum site to the Athletics alleging that the sale violates the Surplus Land Act. After intervention by Major League Baseball commissioner Rob Manfred threatening to move the Athletics, the Oakland City Council officially dropped its lawsuit against Alameda County. As of 2019, then, the Coliseum was owned 50% by the City of Oakland and 50% by the Athletics.

In July 2021, the Oakland City Council asked city staff to pursue negotiations with two Black-led developer groups to purchase their share of the Coliseum, one led by the African American Sports and Entertainment Group and the other by Dave Stewart and Lonnie Murray. Both plans included housing and hotels. The City indicated any plan would also need the support of the Athletics, who would still owned half the site. In November 2021, the Council voted to move forward with the African American Sports and Entertainment Group proposal.

=== Howard Terminal progress ===
On May 13, 2019, the board commissioners of the Port of Oakland voted 7–0 to approve and authorize the executive director to execute the initial term sheet for a term of four years. In October 2019, California Governor Gavin Newsom signed into law two bills intended to streamline the stadium process at the state level.

Ballpark Digest in May 2020 reported that the Howard Terminal ballpark plan "may end up being delayed or even scrapped, as the COVID-19 pandemic and underlying economic uncertainty will certainly impact facility planning for the Athletics." Just prior to this announcement, the Athletics' vice president of communications had stated "the timeline may be adjusted due to the COVID-19 pandemic." In July 2020, the East Oakland Stadium Alliance held a protest with "hundreds of cars" on the A's Opening Night to protest the Howard Terminal proposal and the Coliseum sale.

In 2020, the Athletics were sued by the Pacific Merchant Shipping Association, the Harbor Trucking Association, the California Trucking Association, and Schnitzer Steel Industries (now Radius Recycling), which had a neighboring facility to Howard Terminal and alleged that the Athletics were not qualified to be certified under a California law that would expedite any legal challenge against the team over environmental concerns. This was because the team did not meet a Jan. 1, 2020 deadline for consideration. The suit eventually was dismissed by the Alameda County Superior Court. However, the almost year-long suit delayed the process of the team getting the stadium cleared for construction by at least a year.

On May 11, 2021, with the concern of slow progress on the project, Major League Baseball instructed the A's to begin exploring options for move from Oakland. That same day, Dave Kaval said that the A's remaining in Oakland was "Howard [Terminal] or bust", implying that the failure to secure approval for the Howard Terminal ballpark project would lead to the A's leaving Oakland.

On July 20, 2021, the Oakland City Council voted 6–1–1 to approve a non-binding term sheet to continue negotiations with the A's for the new ballpark. However, Dave Kaval said that the team does not agree to those terms since it was not the term sheet the team provided. In spite of this, the A's agreed to resume talks with the City of Oakland to work on a financial deal to build the ballpark.

On October 26, 2021, the Alameda County Board of Supervisors voted 4–1 on a non-binding agreement to create an infrastructure financing district from property tax revenue of the future ballpark. With this agreement, Alameda County and the City of Oakland would use this tax revenue over a 45-year period to pay for infrastructure near the proposed ballpark, such as improving the roads, adding new sewer, water, and electrical lines.

On February 17, 2022, the Oakland City Council voted 6–2 to certify the Environmental Impact Report for the planned Howard Terminal stadium development. On June 30, the San Francisco Bay Conservation and Development Commission voted 23–2 to remove port priority use from the Howard Terminal site.

=== End of the project ===
In late September 2022, the Athletics missed a city deadline to finalize the stadium plan by pushing negotiations to 2023. Commissioner of Baseball Rob Manfred warned that negotiations stretching into 2023 would create "uncertainty" while Kaval had previously said that it would "all but doom" efforts to keep the team in Oakland and lead to a potential move to Las Vegas where the A's had engaged in negotiations with city officials and local businesses about building a new ballpark in the area. With the National Football League's Raiders having already moved to Las Vegas, the A's would be the second Oakland team to move there if the Howard Terminal plans fell apart. Additionally, with the National Basketball Association's Golden State Warriors returning to San Francisco, Oakland would have no teams in any of the "Big 4 Sports Leagues" to call home after the A's departure.

On April 20, 2023, it was reported that the Athletics had purchased a parcel of land from Red Rock Casino, Resort & Spa for a new stadium in Las Vegas, near the Las Vegas Strip for a new $1.5 billion, 35,000-seat ballpark and were fully committed to moving to the Las Vegas area before shifting to the Tropicana Las Vegas casino-resort with a 30,000–33,000 seat ballpark and subsequent approval from the Nevada Legislature. After this announcement, Oakland mayor Sheng Thao announced the cessation of negotiations with the team regarding the Howard Terminal site, effectively ending the proposed ballpark project.

On November 16, 2023, Major League Baseball's owners voted unanimously in favor of the Athletics' move to Las Vegas. However, at the time of the vote, many details had not been finalized, including where the team would play in the interim period, whether the new stadium would have a retractable roof or fixed dome, how construction would be financed, and when the team could move into the new park.

On April 2, 2024, the Tropicana Las Vegas was closed after having been in operation for 67 years. Demolition was done in October, and construction of the new fixed-roof ballpark began June, 2025. On April 4th, 2024, after the Athletics could not reach a deal with the city of Oakland to extend their lease at the Coliseum, they instead reached an agreement with the Sacramento River Cats, the current Triple-A affiliate of the San Francisco Giants, to share Sutter Health Park for the next three seasons, starting in 2025.

=== Howard Terminal Future ===
Howard Terminal remains in Oakland's plans for Embarcadero West Rail Safety planning, updated March 25, 2024. The site has also been considered for a new stadium for Oakland Roots SC of the USL Championship.

== See also ==
- Rays Ballpark, proposed new stadium for the Tampa Bay Rays
