= New Las Vegas Stadium =

Future ballpark in Las Vegas, Nevada

- An artist's rendering of the stadium, as viewed from East Tropicana Avenue. The Excalibur is visible behind it.
- Interactive map of New Las Vegas Stadium
- Address: Las Vegas Boulevard & Tropicana Avenue
- Location: Paradise, Nevada, U.S.
- Coordinates: 36°05′58″N 115°10′12″W
- Owner: Las Vegas Stadium Authority (LVSA)
- Operator: Athletics
- Capacity: 33,000
- Roof: Skylight
- Surface: Grass
- Acreage: 9 acres (3.6 ha)
- Public transit: MGM Grand

Construction
- Groundbreaking: June 23, 2025
- Opened: 2028; 2 years' time (planned)
- Cost: $1.7 billion
- Architects: Bjarke Ingels Group; HNTB (sports/hospitality designer)
- General contractor: Mortenson-McCarthy Joint Venture

Tenant
- Athletics (MLB) (c. 2028)

Website
- ballparkexperience.athletics.com

New Las Vegas Stadium is the project name of an indoor ballpark on the Las Vegas Strip in Paradise, Nevada, U.S., scheduled to open in 2028. It is the future home venue of the Athletics of Major League Baseball (MLB) and is located on the site of the former Tropicana Las Vegas. The stadium is projected to cost $2 billion. The Athletics franchise has not played in a new stadium of its own without another sports team tenant since the 1909 completion of Shibe Park in Philadelphia.

== Background ==
On May 11, 2021, Major League Baseball permitted the Oakland Athletics to explore moving if the team could not persuade the city of Oakland to replace the outdated and crumbling Oakland Coliseum with a more modern facility by 2024. In April 2023, negotiations between the City of Oakland and the Athletics organization for a modern new ballpark ended. The team declared its intention to partially fund and move into a new $1.5 billion 35,000-seat retractable stadium at the former site of the Wild Wild West Gambling Hall & Hotel. On May 4, Nevada governor Joe Lombardo announced legislation to spend public money on the proposed ballpark. On May 9, the Athletics changed the proposal to a 30,000-seat partially retractable stadium on the site of the Tropicana Las Vegas, with plans to demolish the Tropicana and build a new 1,500-room hotel and casino. The project was expected to cost $1.5 billion.

On May 26, the Athletics released renderings of the 33,000-seat ballpark in Las Vegas to the public designed by Schrock KC Architecture. By May 29, the legislative package for the stadium, known as SB509, was drafted in the Nevada Legislature. Lombardo issued the legislation, renamed SB1, in a special session on June 7. The legislative package was passed in the Legislature and signed by Lombardo on June 15.

A new 3,005 room Bally's Las Vegas is planned to be built at the ballpark site and will surround the ballpark.

=== Financing ===
The stadium is estimated to cost $1.5 billion, of which $380 million will come from public funds and the rest coming from the private sector.

In May 2024, the Athletics hired investment firm Galatiotio Sports Partners to raise $500 million for the ballpark. By May 14, the Supreme Court of Nevada rejected Schools Over Stadiums' effort to put public funding for the ballpark on the ballot. In May 2025, Aramark was awarded a 20-year food-and-beverage contract which included a financial investment in the team and stadium.

== History ==
=== 2023 ===
Three days after SB1 was approved, Bally's chairman Soo Kim told KTNV-TV that the Tropicana might not be razed for the ballpark until two years later into construction and that there was a scenario where part of the resort-casino could remain after the ballpark is complete. He also noted that the ballpark would include a new casino resort and a separate, adjacent sports-themed attraction. On June 21, the Athletics officially began the process of moving to Las Vegas by beginning an application to MLB.

Two weeks after the bill's approval, the Athletics revealed that Bally's would provide 3 to 4 more acres of land on the Tropicana for the ballpark with plans to hire a design architect, a construction firm and a project manager amid concerns about its size. Clark County spokeswoman Jennifer Cooper said her county could not issue $120 million until other agreements were finalized and the Athletics deposit $100 million for the project.

In July 2023, Steve Hill of the Las Vegas Convention and Visitors Authority (LVCVA) revealed that the Athletics would use just $340 million of the $380 million in public funding available to finance the new ballpark at the Tropicana. Two days later, Hill said that the Las Vegas Stadium Authority would meet on August 24 to detail the moving process. Brad Schrock, the head director of the Athletics' ballpark design, said that the project could have up to 33,000 seats. By July 27, Schrock also revealed that the ballpark would turn four acres of its site into a plaza similar to T-Mobile Arena, the current home of the National Hockey League's Vegas Golden Knights. Additionally, the Athletics announced that they would select Gensler or the joint bid by HNTB (which participated in the construction of Allegiant Stadium, the current home of the National Football League's Las Vegas Raiders) and Bjarke Ingels Group as the design team for the ballpark by November for the new renderings with the latter previously involved in the scrapped Howard Terminal ballpark plans in Oakland.

In August, Athletics president Dave Kaval revealed that the New Las Vegas Stadium would have a capacity of 33,000 seats as opposed to 30,000 in the initial plans. On August 21, the Athletics announced that a joint venture between the Minneapolis-based Mortenson Company and McCarthy Building Companies would serve as the construction manager for the ballpark.

In September, the Athletics hired Creative Artists Agency sub-division CAA ICON as the consulting firm for the ballpark in overseeing project management such as the architect and managers. By September 13, the ballpark was announced to be climate-controlled and contain a retractable roof to allow for an open-air atmosphere and protect spectators from the heat.

In October, the Las Vegas Stadium Authority revealed that construction for the new stadium was slated to tentatively begin in April 2025 with a completion date of January 2028 and a 30-year, rent-free lease for the Athletics along with the option for the team to buy the stadium and pay for all operations to maintain "facility standards". The organization also voted to approve a $700,000 retainer for the law firm Hunton Andrews Kurth LLP.

In November, the MLB owners unanimously approved the move and paved the way for the stadium's construction. It will be the first time since 2019 that they and the Raiders play in the same city, although each team will now have its own separate venue instead of sharing the same one, as they did in Oakland. The move will leave Oakland with no major league sports teams, as the National Basketball Association's Golden State Warriors have returned to San Francisco.

=== 2024 ===
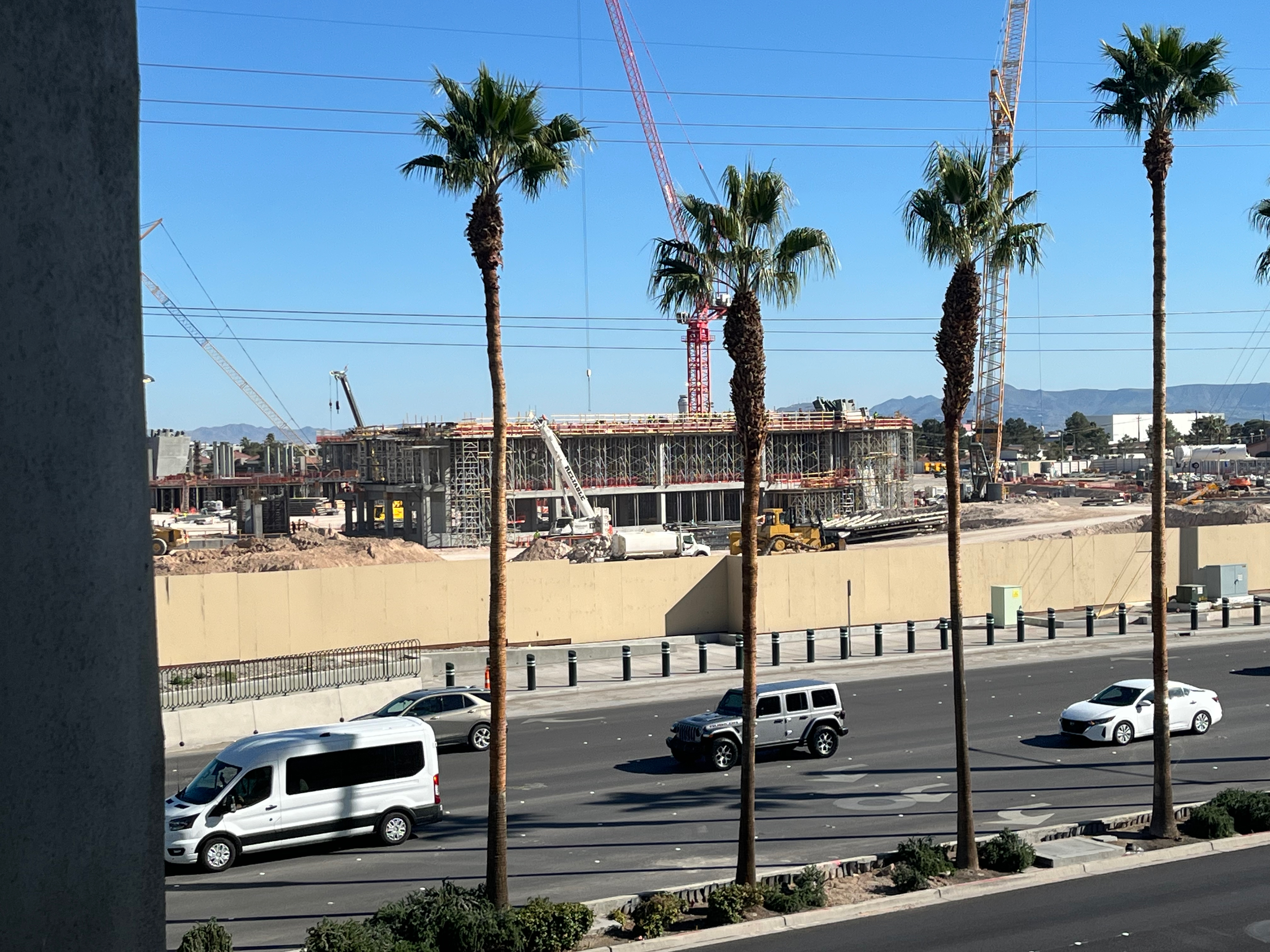
Construction as of February 2026

Construction as of October 2026

By March, updated renderings of the ballpark were revealed to the public; the stadium resembles a "spherical armadillo" with some resemblance to the Sydney Opera House, featuring a fixed roof inspired by baseball pennants, multi-tiered seating, the world's largest cable-net window facing Las Vegas Boulevard, a Jumbotron, and a three-acre plaza. The design was created by the Bjarke Ingels Group and HNTB.

On April 2, the Tropicana Las Vegas closed after 67 years. On October 9, 2024, the Tropicana Hotel was demolished by implosion, and site-leveling efforts ensued. Plans submitted to Clark County project three 495-foot hotel towers housing more than 3,000 hotel rooms on the northeast and southwest corners of the lot, beside the 290-foot-tall stadium. Construction on the ballpark was to begin in spring 2025.

In May 2024, the president of Las Vegas Events said that the National Finals Rodeo could move to the new stadium. The annual December event had been held at the Thomas & Mack Center in Las Vegas since 1985.

=== 2025 ===
Construction on the ballpark began in May 2025 with foundation work. A groundbreaking ceremony was held on June 23. Work done by late September included pouring concrete for the foundation and elevator cores, erecting rebar cages and columns, and groundwork.

In December, team owners said projected construction costs had risen to $2 billion from the $1.75 billion goal. They said the stadium was still on track to open in 2028.

=== 2026 ===
By February 2026, foundation work on the ballpark was complete. In April, the stadium was reported to be ahead of its construction schedule.

Events and tenants
Preceded by Sutter Health Park	Home of the Athletics; 2028 (planned)	Succeeded by none
