= Oakland–Alameda County Coliseum Authority =

The Oakland–Alameda County Coliseum Authority is a joint powers agency established by the City of Oakland and the County of Alameda to manage and finance improvements to the 120-acre (490,000 m^{2}) Oakland–Alameda County Coliseum Complex on behalf of the City and the County. The complex is home of the Oakland Coliseum and Oakland Arena.

The Coliseum Authority is governed by a Board Commissioners that meets monthly The agency's operations are headed by a chairman (e.g. Alameda County Supervisor Scott Haggerty) and an executive director (e.g. Ann Haley). The Coliseum Authority contracts with AEG Facilities to operate the Coliseum Complex.

In 2019, Alameda County agreed to sell their interest in the complex to the Oakland Athletics for $85 million over five years as part of a planned re-development of the site by the Athletics into a "multi-sports facility" that would include affordable housing and parks and help finance a new ballpark for the team at the Port of Oakland.

== See also ==
- Sports in Oakland, California
- Rebecca Kaplan
- Carole Ward Allen
