= Lonnie Murray =

American sports agent

- Occupation: MLBPA-Certified Player Agent

Lonnie Murray is a Major League Baseball (MLB) agent. She was the first Black woman to be certified as a player agent by the MLB Players Association.

== Career ==
Murray says sports were a large part of her life, including playing sports while growing up, but she had not considered a career in it. She worked in the nonprofit sector, including for Coaching Corps. She met her partner, Dave Stewart, when he was on the board of a nonprofit. She joined the staff of Sports Management Partners, the San Diego-based agent firm founded by Stewart, helping run the business with him.

In 2014, when Stewart became general manager of the Arizona Diamondbacks, he planned to transfer ownership to Dave Henderson, but Henderson's health problems limited his involvement. Murray became a player agent by the MLB Players Association in 2015, with restrictions in place to prevent a conflict of interest involving Stewart's team.

As of 2020, Murray represented approximately 40 players, mostly minor leaguers.

Murray has been vocal about the systemic racism in baseball. She represented Bruce Maxwell, the first MLB player to kneel for the national anthem.

Murray is also supportive of efforts to increase the percentage of women who are sports agents. She supports other women to become sports agents. Murray represents Bianca Smith, the first Black woman to coach professional baseball.

In 2021, Murray and Stewart were one of two Black-led redevelopment groups approved by the Oakland City Council to advance a bid to purchase the Oakland Coliseum site.

== Personal ==
Murray and Stewart live in Poway, California. She has a son named Tarik.
