= Oakland Coliseum =

Multi-purpose stadium in Oakland, California, U.S.

Oakland–Alameda County Coliseum
- The Coliseum; Milk Bowl; The Black Hole; Baseball's Last Dive Bar
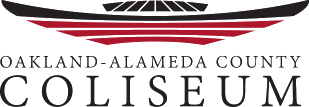

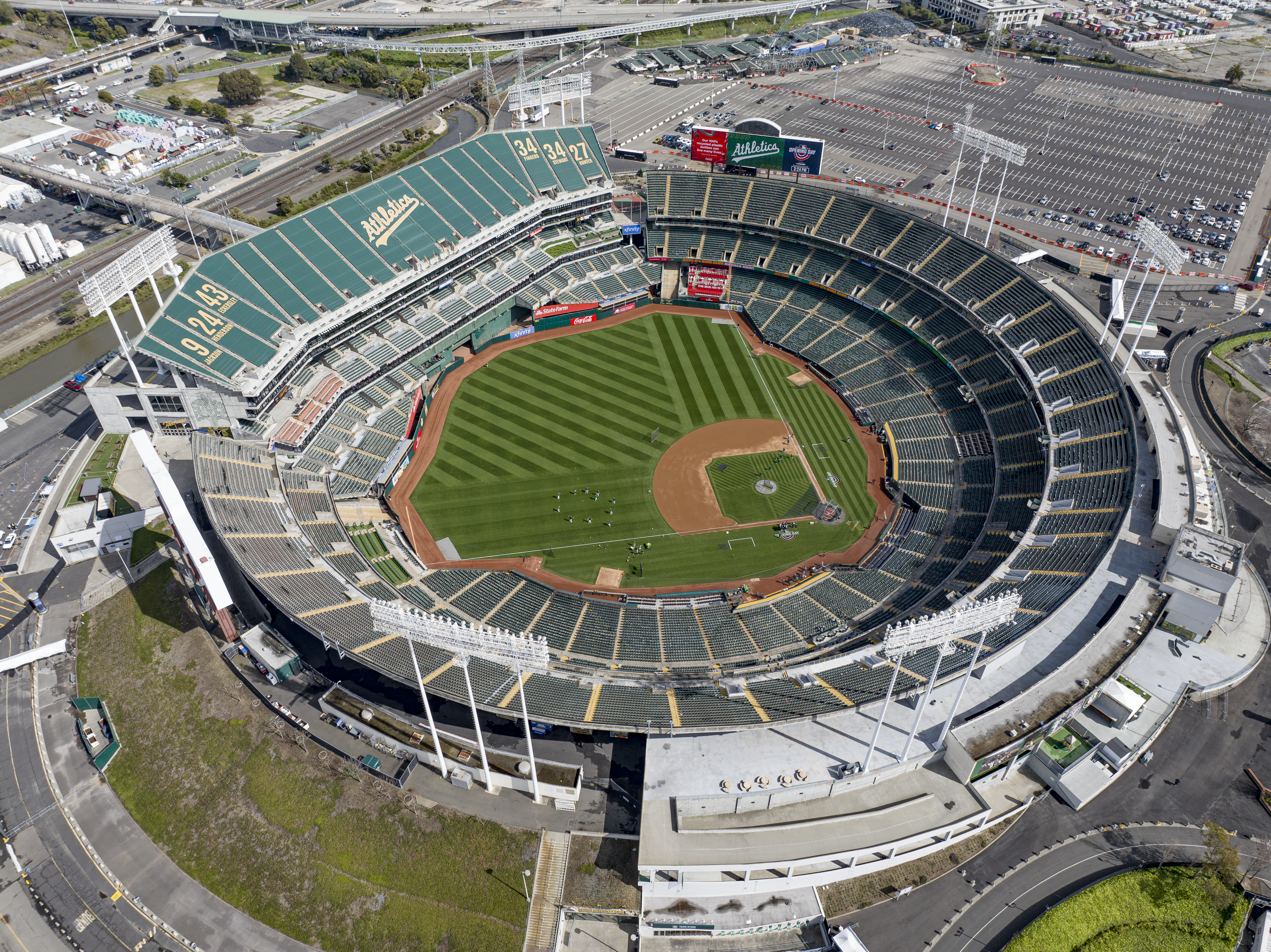
- Oakland Coliseum in 2024

- Location in Oakland Location in California Location in the United States
- Former names: Oakland–Alameda County Coliseum (1966–1998, 2008–2011, 2016–2019, 2020, 2023–present); Network Associates Coliseum (1998–2004); McAfee Coliseum (2004–2008); Overstock.com Coliseum (2011); O.co Coliseum (2011–2016); RingCentral Coliseum (2019–2020, 2020–2023)
- Address: 7000 Coliseum Way
- Location: Oakland, California, United States
- Coordinates: 37°45′6″N 122°12′2″W
- Owner: Oakland–Alameda County Coliseum Authority (City of Oakland and Alameda County)
- Operator: AEG
- Capacity: Baseball: 46,847 (expandable to 56,782 without tarps); Football: 53,200 (expandable to 63,132); Concerts: 47,416 or 64,829 (depending on configuration); Soccer: 15,000; Cricket: 12,000
- Surface: Tifway II Bermuda Grass
- Scoreboard: 36 feet (11 m) high by 145 feet (44 m) wide
- Record attendance: Baseball: 56,310 (July 21, 2018, Athletics vs Giants) Football: 62,784 (January 14, 2001, Raiders vs Ravens)
- Field size: Left field 330 feet (101 m); Left center 388 feet (118 m); Center field 400 feet (122 m); Right center 388 feet (118 m); Right field 330 feet (101 m); Backstop 60 feet (18 m)
- Public transit: AC Transit: 45, 46L, 73, 90, 98, 646, 657, 805; Alameda County East Oakland Shuttle; Amtrak: Capitol Corridor at Oakland Coliseum; BART: at Coliseum; Harbor Bay Business Park Shuttle

Construction
- Groundbreaking: April 15, 1964
- Opened: September 18, 1966
- Renovated: 1995–1996, 2017
- Cost: $25.5 million ($253 million in 2025 dollars) $200 million (1995–96 renovation) ($411 million in 2025 dollars)
- Architects: Skidmore, Owings & Merrill; HNTB (1995–96 renovation)
- Structural engineer: Ammann & Whitney
- Services engineer: Syska & Hennessy, Inc.
- General contractor: Guy F. Atkinson Company

Tenants
- Oakland Athletics (MLB) (1968–2024); Oakland Raiders (AFL/NFL) (1966–1981; 1995–2019); Oakland Clippers (NPSL/NASL) 1967–1968; Oakland Stompers (NASL) 1978; Oakland Invaders (USFL) (1983–1985); San Jose Earthquakes (MLS) (2008–2009); Oakland Roots (USLC) (2025–present); Oakland Soul (USLW) (2025–present); San Francisco Unicorns (MLC) (2025–present)

Website
- theoaklandarena.com

The Oakland–Alameda County Coliseum, often shortened to the Oakland Coliseum, is a multi-purpose stadium in Oakland, California, United States. It serves as part of the Oakland–Alameda County Coliseum Complex, located next to Oakland Arena. In 2017, the playing surface was dedicated as Rickey Henderson Field in honor of Major League Baseball Hall of Famer and former Oakland Athletics left fielder Rickey Henderson.

The Oakland Coliseum is currently the home of the San Francisco Unicorns of Major League Cricket. The stadium was the home of the Oakland Athletics of Major League Baseball from 1968 to 2024. It was also the home of the Oakland Raiders of the National Football League from 1966 until 1981, when the team moved to Los Angeles, and again after the team's return, from 1995 until 2019, when the team moved to Las Vegas. For the last years of top-flight professional sports at the venue, it was primarily used for baseball. It was the last remaining stadium in the United States shared by professional baseball and football teams. It has occasionally been used for soccer, currently being host to second-division soccer league USL Championship's Oakland Roots SC, and has previously hosted select San Jose Earthquakes matches in 2008 and 2009. Additionally, it was used for international matches during the 2009 CONCACAF Gold Cup.

The Coliseum has a seating capacity of up to 63,132 depending on its configuration; an upper deck dubbed "Mount Davis" by fans was added as part of a 1996 renovation for the Raiders' return to Oakland. In 2006, citing a desire to provide a more "intimate" environment, the Athletics blocked off the entirety of the Coliseum's third deck during its games, which artificially limited its capacity to 34,077 (making it the smallest stadium in Major League Baseball). On April 11, 2017, with Dave Kaval as the team president, the Athletics began to reopen some of the sections in the third deck, and open the Mount Davis deck for selected marquee games; this configuration made it, by contrast, the largest baseball stadium in the United States by capacity through 2024.

The state of Oakland Coliseum has been widely criticized; sports fans and players alike consider the Coliseum to be poorly maintained and out of date. During its later years as an MLB stadium it was often cited, along with Tropicana Field, as one of the worst ballparks in the league. The Athletics played their final season at the Coliseum in 2024, moving to West Sacramento's Sutter Health Park while planning to relocate to Las Vegas.

== Stadium history ==
=== Planning and construction ===
Business and political leaders in Oakland had long been in competition with neighboring San Francisco, as well as other cities in the West, and worked for Oakland and its greater East Bay suburbs to be recognized nationally as a viable metropolitan area with its own identity and reputation, distinct and separate from that of San Francisco. Professional sports was seen as a primary way for the East Bay to gain such recognition. As a result, the desire for a major league stadium in the city of Oakland intensified during the 1950s and 1960s.

By 1960, a non-profit corporation was formed to oversee the financing and development of the facility rather than city or county government issuing taxpayer-backed bonds for construction. Local real estate developer Robert T. Nahas (who had been president of Oakland's chamber of commerce) headed this group, which included other prominent East Bay business leaders such as former US Senator William Knowland and Edgar F. Kaiser, and which later became the governing board of the Coliseum upon completion. It was Nahas' idea that the Coliseum be privately financed with ownership transferring to the city and county upon retirement of the construction financing.

Nahas served 20 years as President of the Oakland–Alameda County Coliseum Board. On the death of Nahas, Jack Maltester, a former San Leandro mayor and Coliseum board member, said, "If not for Bob Nahas, there would be no Coliseum, it's really that simple." Nahas had to be a diplomat dealing with the egos of Raiders owner Al Davis, Athletics owner Charles O. Finley, and Warriors owner Franklin Mieuli.

Preliminary architectural plans were unveiled in November 1960, and the following month a site was chosen west of the Elmhurst district of East Oakland alongside the recently completed Nimitz Freeway. A downtown site adjacent to Lake Merritt and the Oakland Auditorium was also originally considered. The Port of Oakland played a key role in selection of the East Oakland site. The Port gave 157 acres (64 ha) at the head of San Leandro Bay to the East Bay Regional Park District, in exchange for 105 acres (42 ha) of park land across the freeway. The Port then donated that land to the City of Oakland as the site for the complex.

The Oakland Raiders of the American Football League (AFL) moved to Frank Youell Field, a makeshift stadium near downtown Oakland, for their third season in 1962, and the Coliseum was already being heralded in the local media as the Raiders' future permanent home. Baseball was also a major factor in the planning of the Coliseum. As early as 1961, the American League publicly indicated that it wished to include Oakland in its West Coast expansion plans. In 1963, American League president Joe Cronin suggested that Coliseum officials model some aspects of the new ballpark after the recently completed Dodger Stadium, which impressed him, though these expansion plans seemed to fade by the middle of the decade.

After approval from the city of Oakland as well as Alameda County by 1962, $25 million in financing was arranged. Plans were drawn for a stadium, an indoor arena, and an exhibition hall in between them. The architect of record was the San Francisco office of Skidmore, Owings & Merrill with Myron Goldsmith the principal design architect and the general contractor was Guy F. Atkinson Company. Preliminary site preparation began in the summer of 1961, and construction started the following spring. The construction schedule was delayed for two years due to various legal issues and cost overruns; the original design had to be modified slightly to stay within budget.

In 1965, it was rumored that the Cleveland Indians might leave for a West Coast city (such as Oakland), but the Indians stayed in Cleveland. Charlie Finley, owner of the Kansas City Athletics, unhappy in Kansas City at its municipal stadium, was impressed by Oakland's new venue and Nahas personally convinced him to consider moving the A's to Oakland. After several unsuccessful attempts and amid considerable controversy, Finley eventually got permission to relocate the Athletics to Oakland prior to the 1968 season. The expansion Kansas City Royals, the A's replacement, debuted the next year.

=== Stadium name changes ===
For over three decades (1966–1998), the stadium was first known as Oakland–Alameda County Coliseum.

In September 1997, UMAX Technologies agreed to acquire the naming rights to the stadium. However, following a dispute, a court decision reinstated the Oakland–Alameda County Coliseum name. In 1998, Network Associates agreed to pay US$5.8 million over five years for the naming rights and the stadium became known as Network Associates Coliseum, or, alternately in marketing and media usage as, "the Net".

Network Associates renewed the contract in 2003 for an additional five years at a cost of $6 million. In mid-2004, Network Associates was renamed McAfee, restoring its name from before its 1997 merger with Network General, and the stadium was renamed McAfee Coliseum accordingly.

McAfee was offered a renewal of the naming contract in 2008, but it was declined. The name reverted to the pre-1997 name of Oakland–Alameda County Coliseum on September 19, 2008. The stadium retained its original name until April 27, 2011, when it was renamed Overstock.com Coliseum via a six-year, $7.2 million naming rights deal with online retailer Overstock.com.

The Coliseum was renamed O.co Coliseum on June 6, 2011, after Overstock.com's marketing name. However, due to a contract dispute with the Athletics regarding the Overstock/O.co naming rights deal, the A's continued to refer to the stadium as the Oakland–Alameda County Coliseum in all official team communications and on team websites.

Overstock opted out of the final year on their naming rights deal on April 2, 2016, and the stadium once again became the Oakland–Alameda County Coliseum.

The Athletics dedicated the Coliseum's playing surface "Rickey Henderson Field" in honor of MLB Hall of Famer and former Athletic Rickey Henderson as part of Opening Day on April 3, 2017.

RingCentral placed a bid for the naming rights on May 14, 2019, for a $1 million annual payment. The Oakland–Alameda County Coliseum Authority gave its approval of the new naming-rights deal on May 31, 2019, pending formal approval from Major League Baseball. New signage was in place by the time that the Golden State Warriors hosted the 2019 NBA Finals at the neighboring Oracle Arena on June 5.

In August 2019, the head of the Coliseum Authority, Scott McKibben, abruptly resigned his position after allegations emerged that he had requested a $50,000 fee from RingCentral in exchange for negotiating the naming rights deal. McKibben was subsequently charged by the Alameda County district attorney's office with violating conflict-of-interest laws, including one felony and one misdemeanor count, ultimately pleading nolo contendere to the misdemeanor in exchange for the dropping of the felony charge. On January 17, 2020, the RingCentral naming rights deal was rescinded by the Coliseum Authority. In late 2020, a new three year naming rights deal with RingCentral was agreed to.

On April 1, 2023, the Coliseum terminated its sponsorship with RingCentral, reverting to its original name.

McAfee Coliseum Logo (2004–2008)

Logo (2008–2011)

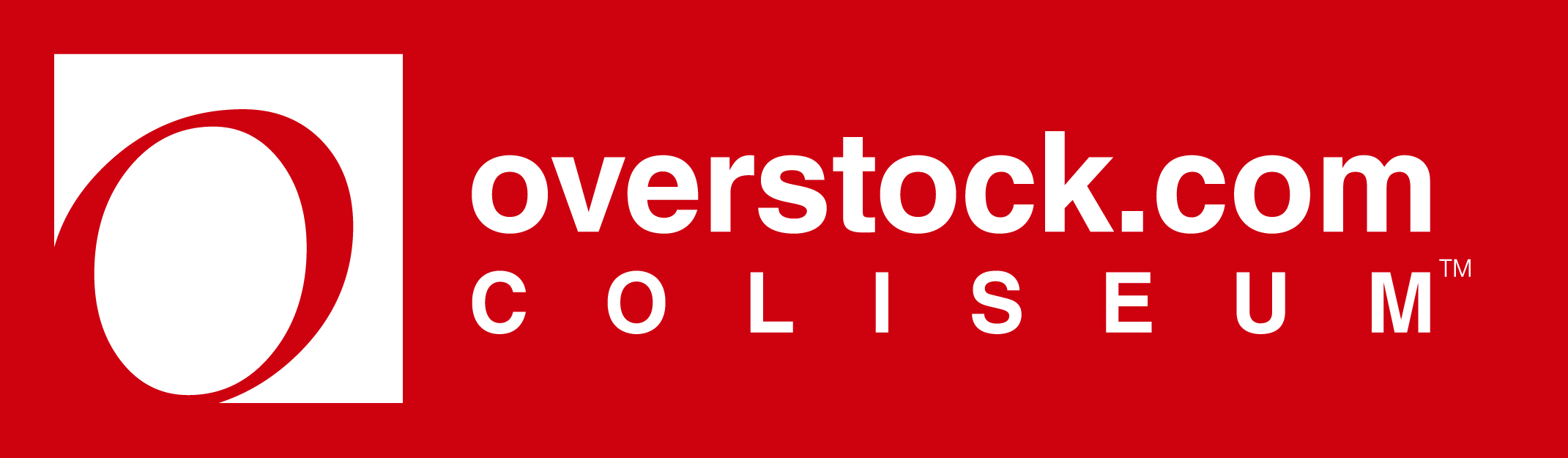
Overstock.com Coliseum Logo (April–June 2011)

O.co Coliseum Logo (2011–2016)

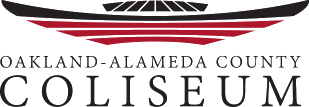
Logo (2016–2019)

RingCentral Coliseum Logo (2019–2023)

== Design ==
The Coliseum features an underground design where the playing surface is not only below ground level, it is 21 feet (6.4 m) below sea level. Consequently, fans entering the stadium find themselves walking on to the main concourse of the stadium at the top of the first level of seats. This, combined with the hill that was built around the stadium to create the upper concourse, means that only the third deck is visible from outside the park.

=== Configurations ===
In its baseball configuration, the Coliseum had the most foul territory of any ballpark in Major League Baseball. Thus, many balls that would reach the seats in other ballparks would be caught for outs at the Coliseum. The distance to the backstop was initially 90 feet (27 m), but was reduced to 60 feet (18 m) in 1969.

From 1968 through 1981 and in 1995, two football configurations were used at the stadium. During Raider preseason games and all regular season games played while the baseball season was still going on, the field was set up from home plate to center field (east/west). Seats that were down the foul lines for baseball games became the sideline seats for football games, which started up to 120 feet (37 m) away from the field (most football-only stadiums have sideline seats that start half that distance away). Once the A's season ended, the orientation was switched to north–south: i.e. the football field ran from the left field line to the right field line; seats were moved from behind first and third base to create corners for the end zone to fit into (these seats were then placed to fill in the space that was normally behind home plate and near the foul poles for baseball games). Temporary football bleachers were then added in front of the baseball bleachers to form the sideline on the east (visitors') side, and the baseball bleachers were not sold. Raiders season ticket holders would thus have two season ticket locations in different parts of the stadium that roughly corresponded to the same location in relation to the field. After stadium expansion in 1996, the field ran north–south throughout the season.

=== Seating capacity ===
Baseball seating capacity at the Oakland Coliseum
Years	Capacity
1968–1976	50,000
1977–1980	49,649
1981–1982	50,255
1983–1984	50,219
1985	50,255
1986	50,219
1987	49,219
1988	50,219
1989	49,219
1990	48,219
1991	47,450
1992–1995	47,313
1996–1997	39,875
1998–2005	43,662
2006–2007	34,077
2008–2016	35,067
2017–2018	47,170
2019–2024	46,867

Football seating capacity at Oakland Coliseum
Years	Capacity
1966–1972	54,587
1973–1974	54,041
1975–1976	54,037
1977–1988	54,615
1989–1995	54,444
1996–1998	63,026
1999–2012	63,132
2013	53,286
2014–2017	56,057
2018–2019	55,997

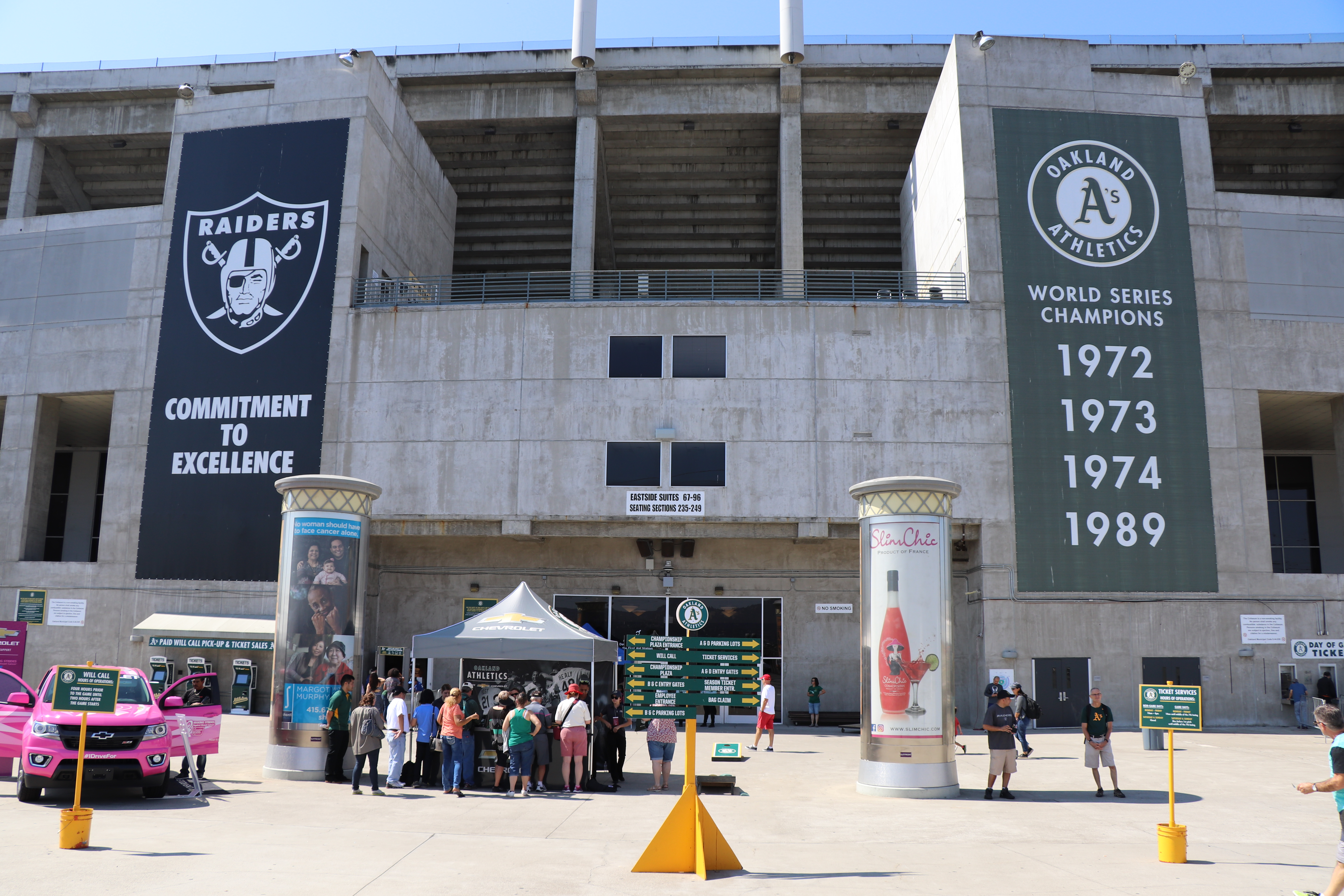
Gate at the Oakland Coliseum, September 10, 2017

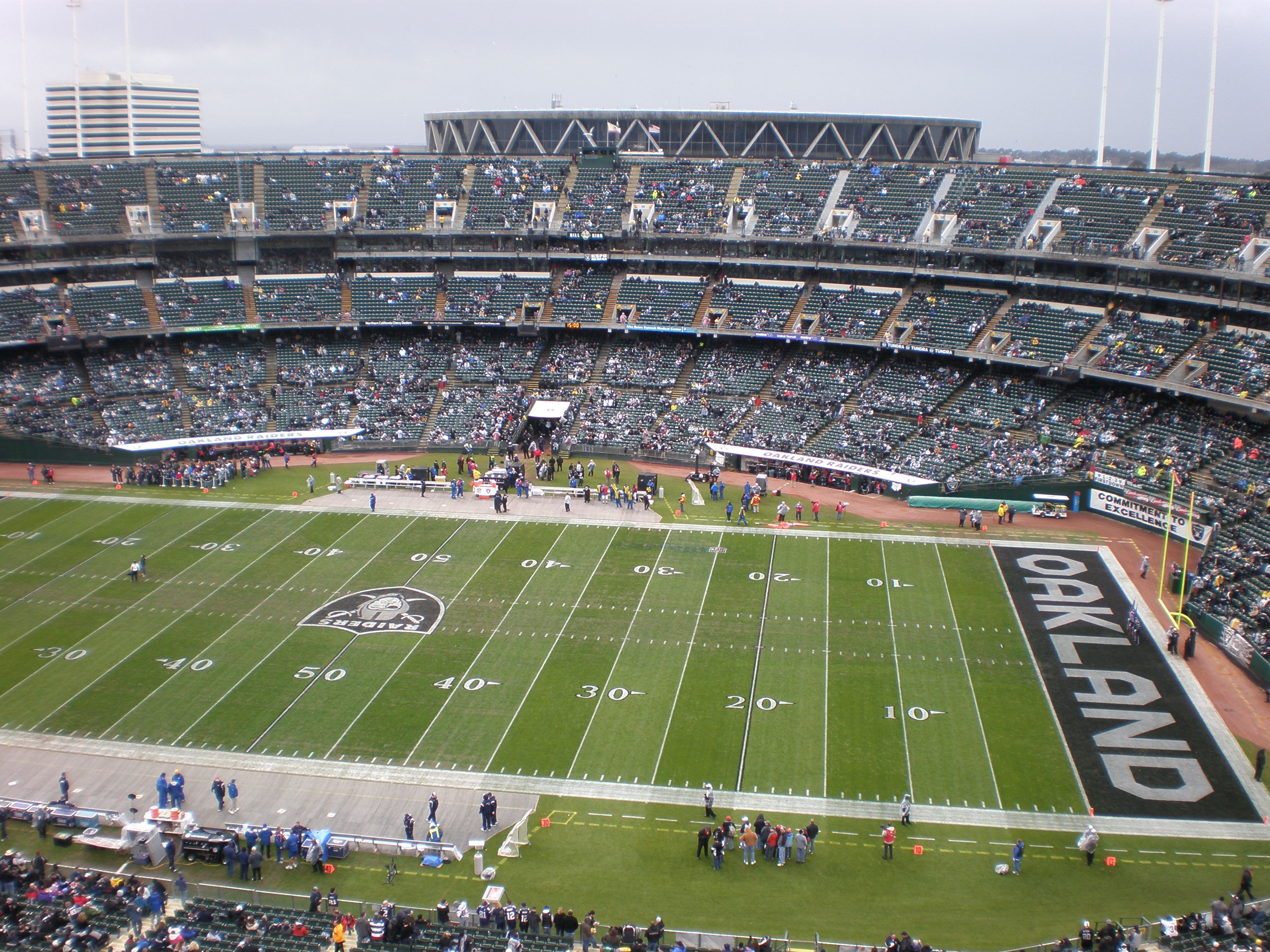
Oakland Coliseum during a football game

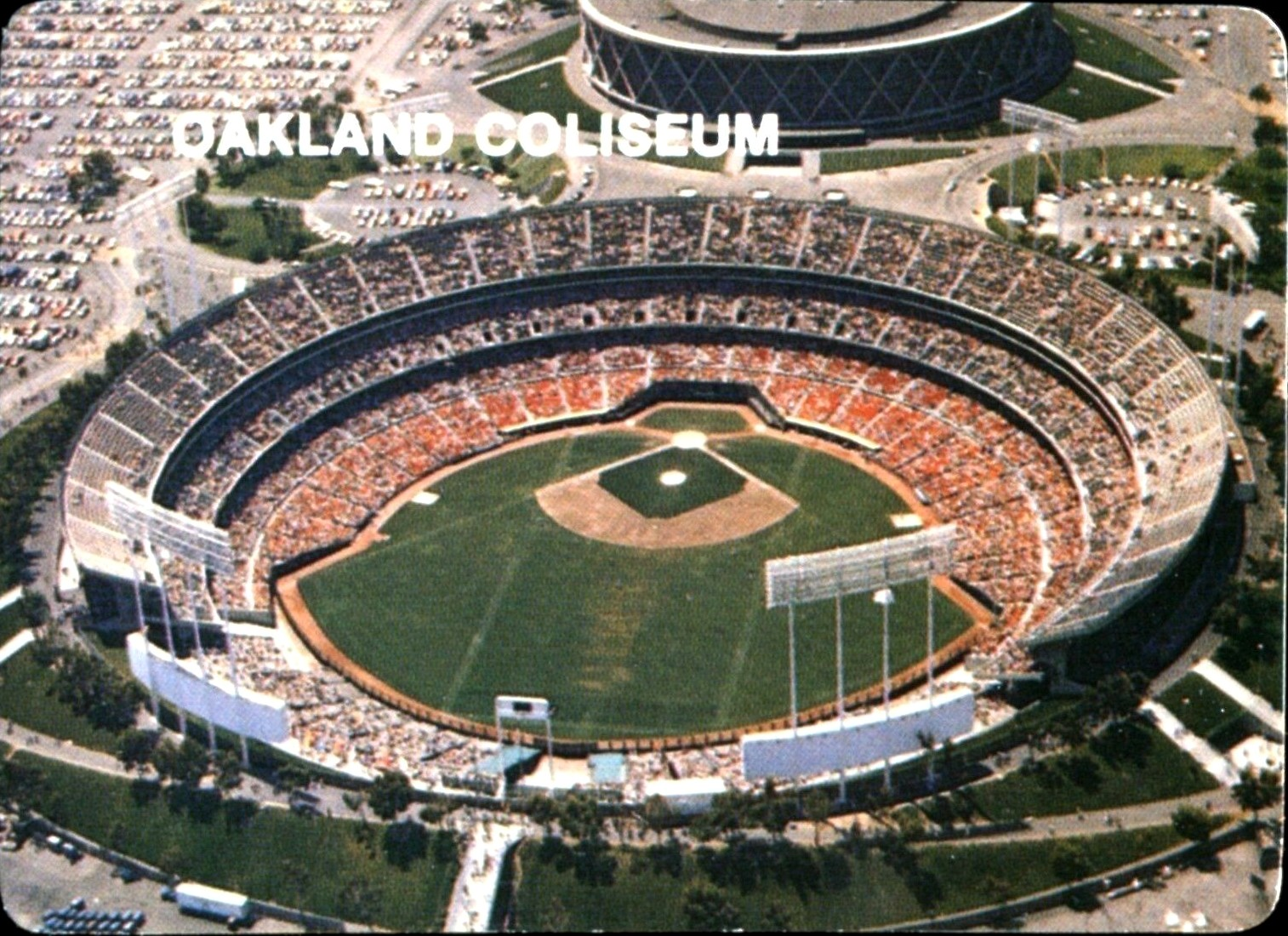
The Coliseum as seen in its original open grandstand configuration before being enclosed

Oakland Coliseum concourse

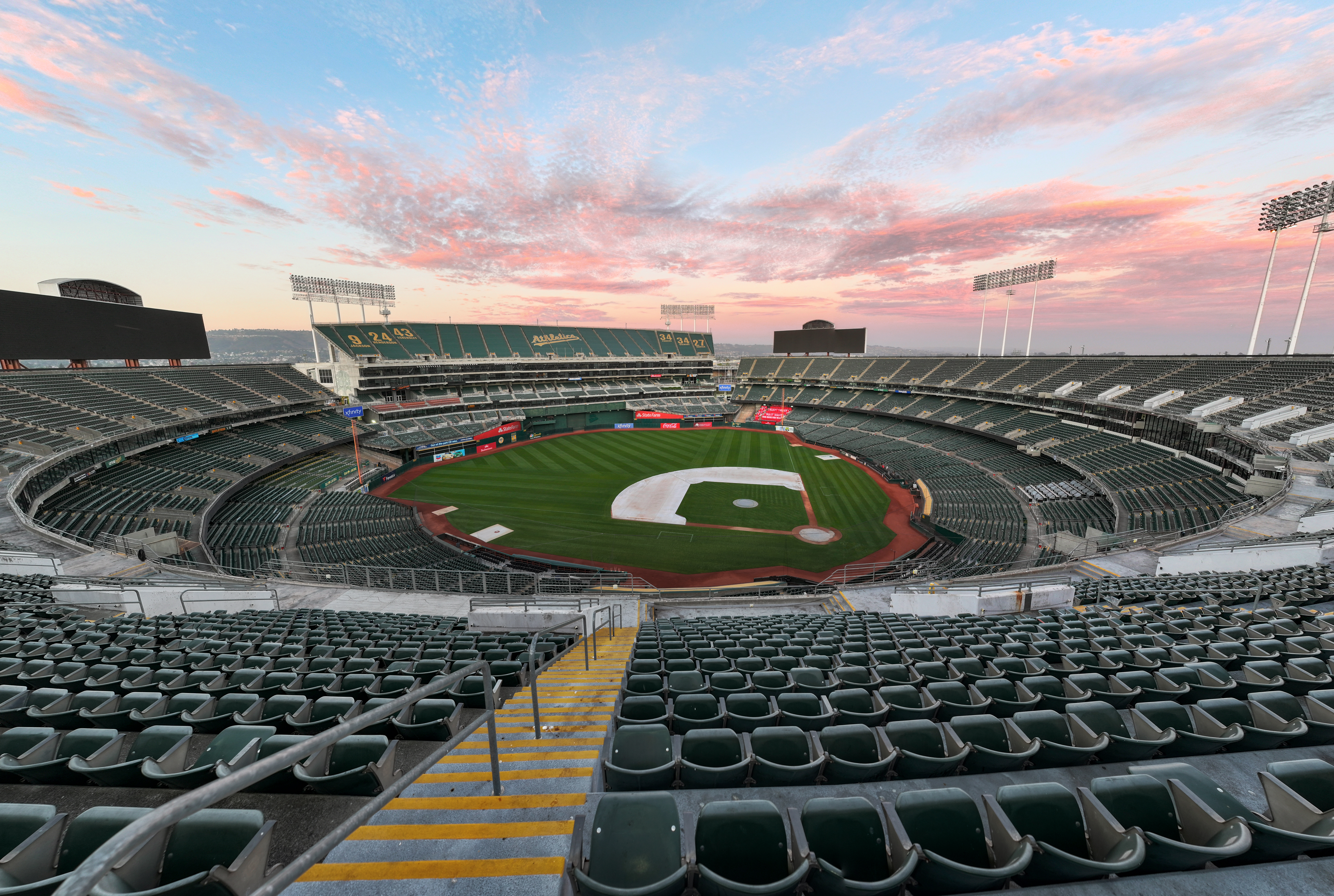
Vantage point from upper deck

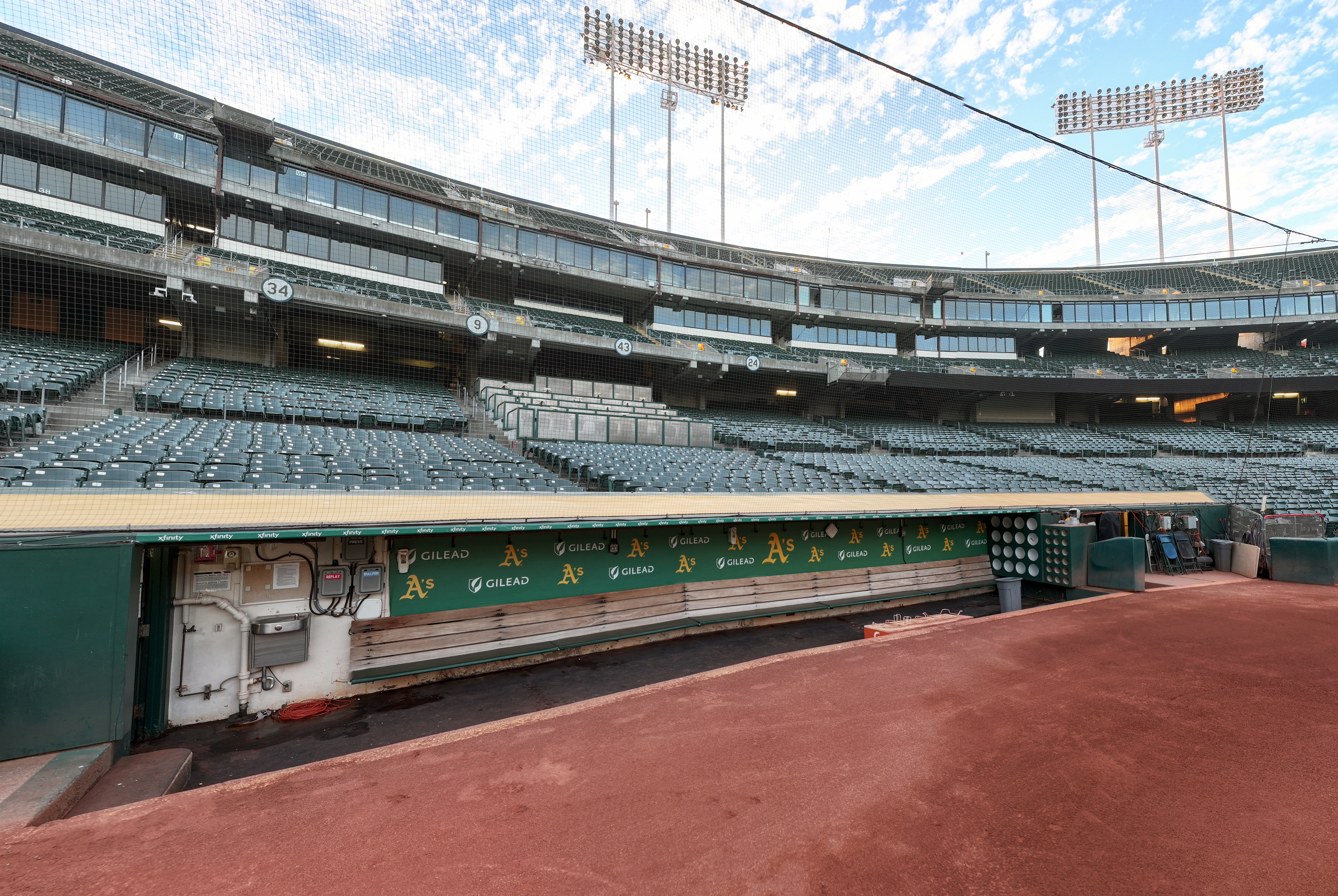
Dugouts used for baseball games

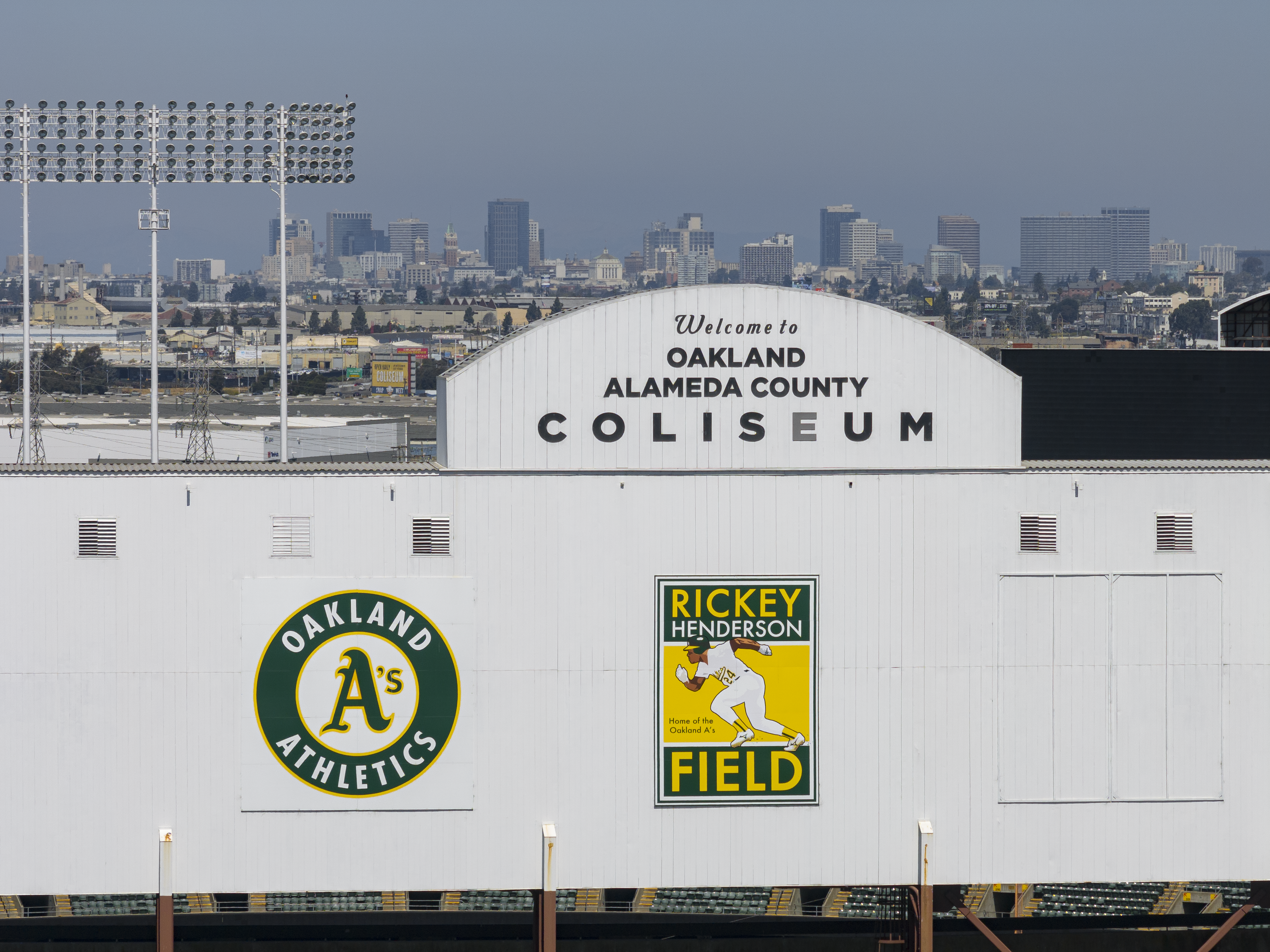
Scoreboard with view of Downtown Oakland

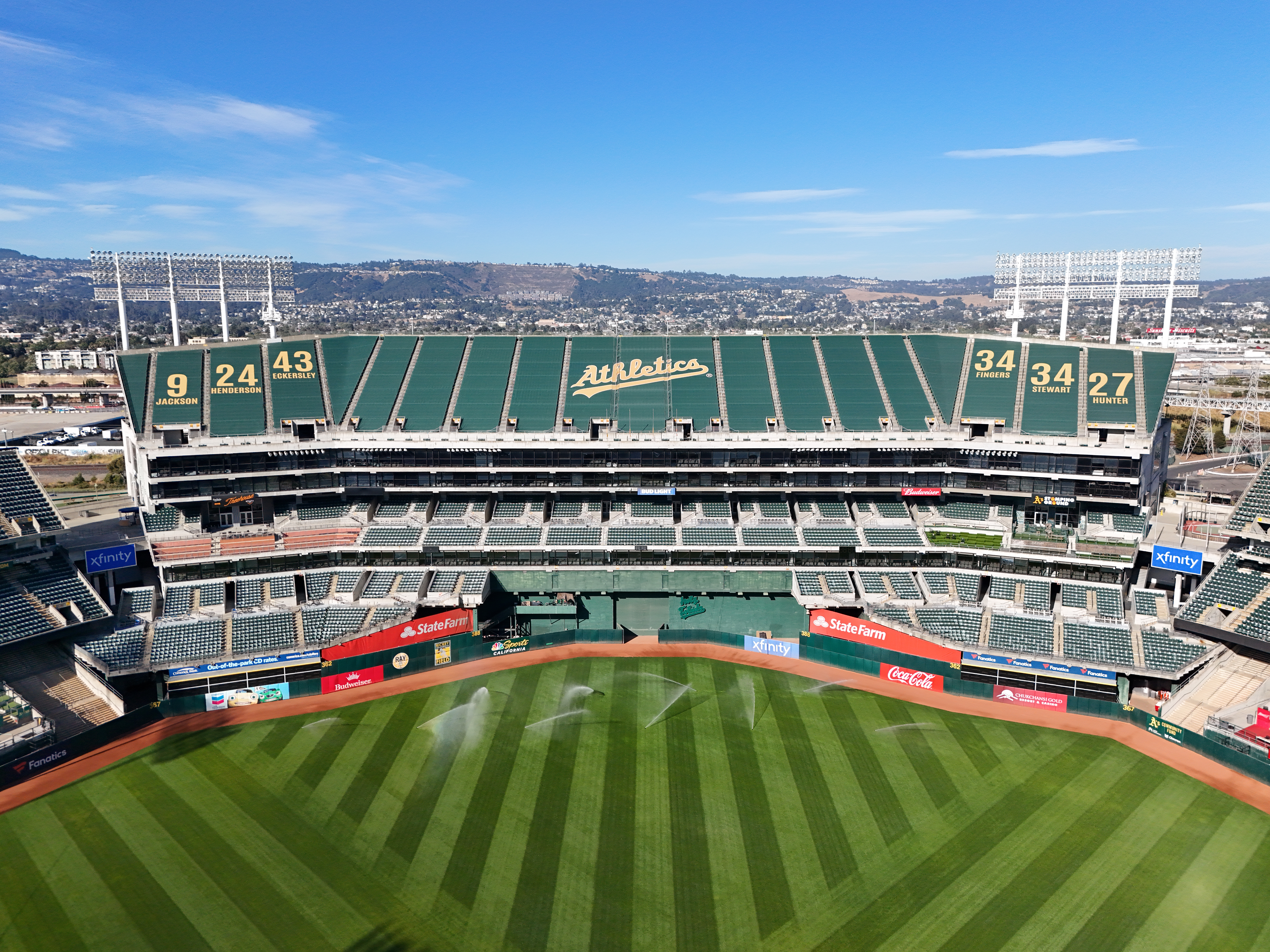
1996 addition of an upper deck largely goes unused and stays covered in tarp

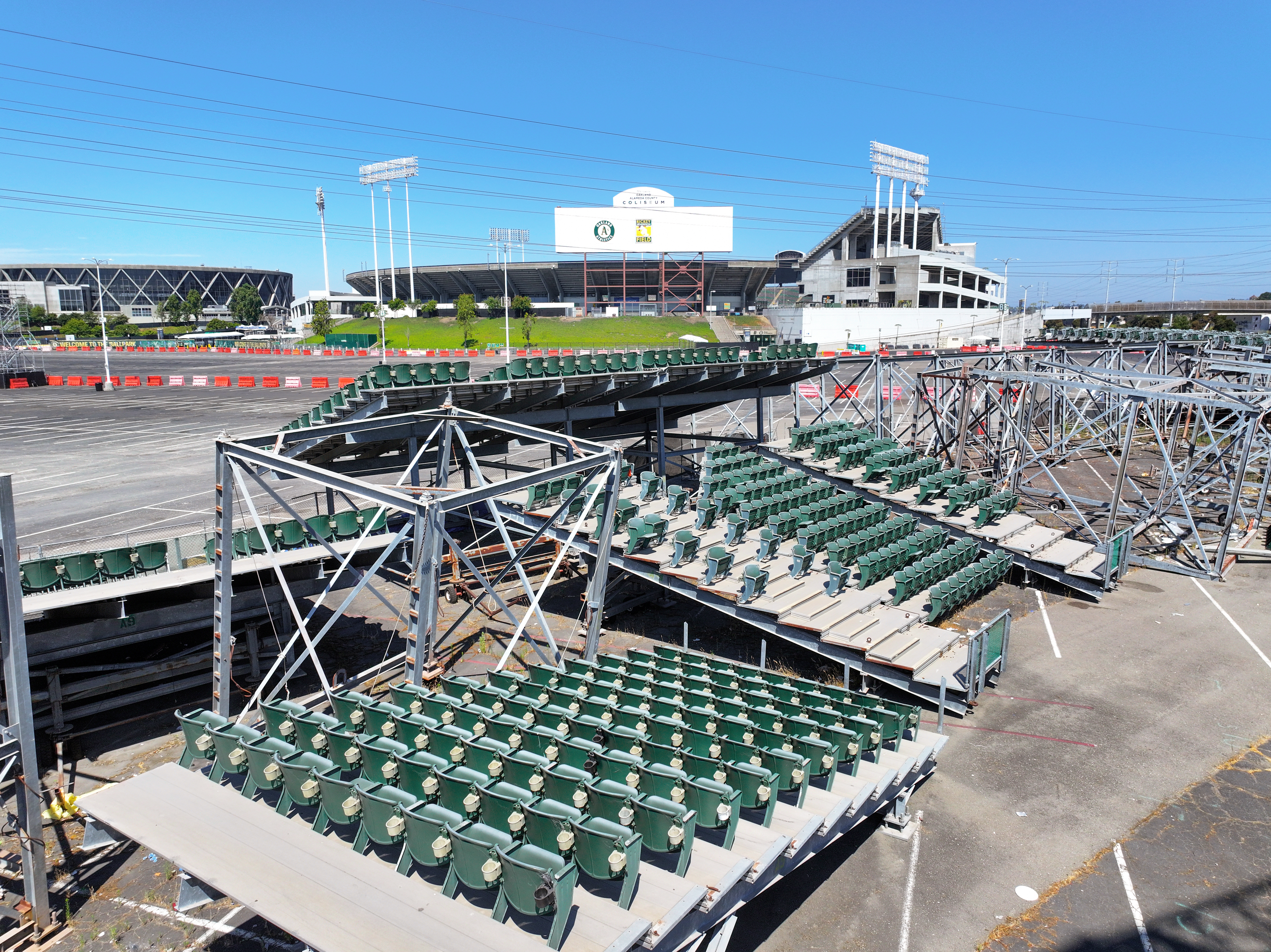
Collapsable Raiders seats left abandoned

Rooted in Oakland campaign sign at the entrance

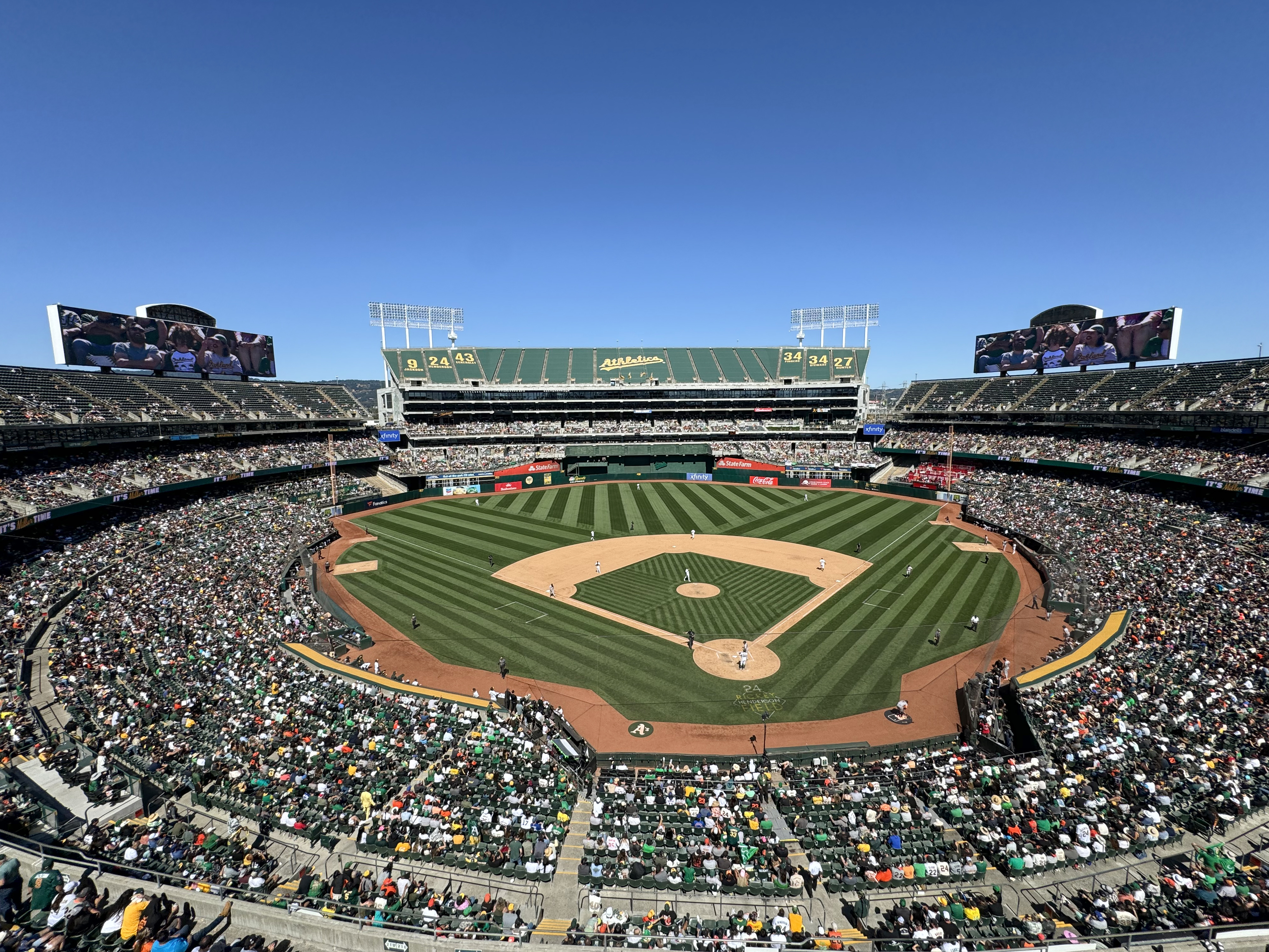
Final Bay Bridge Series

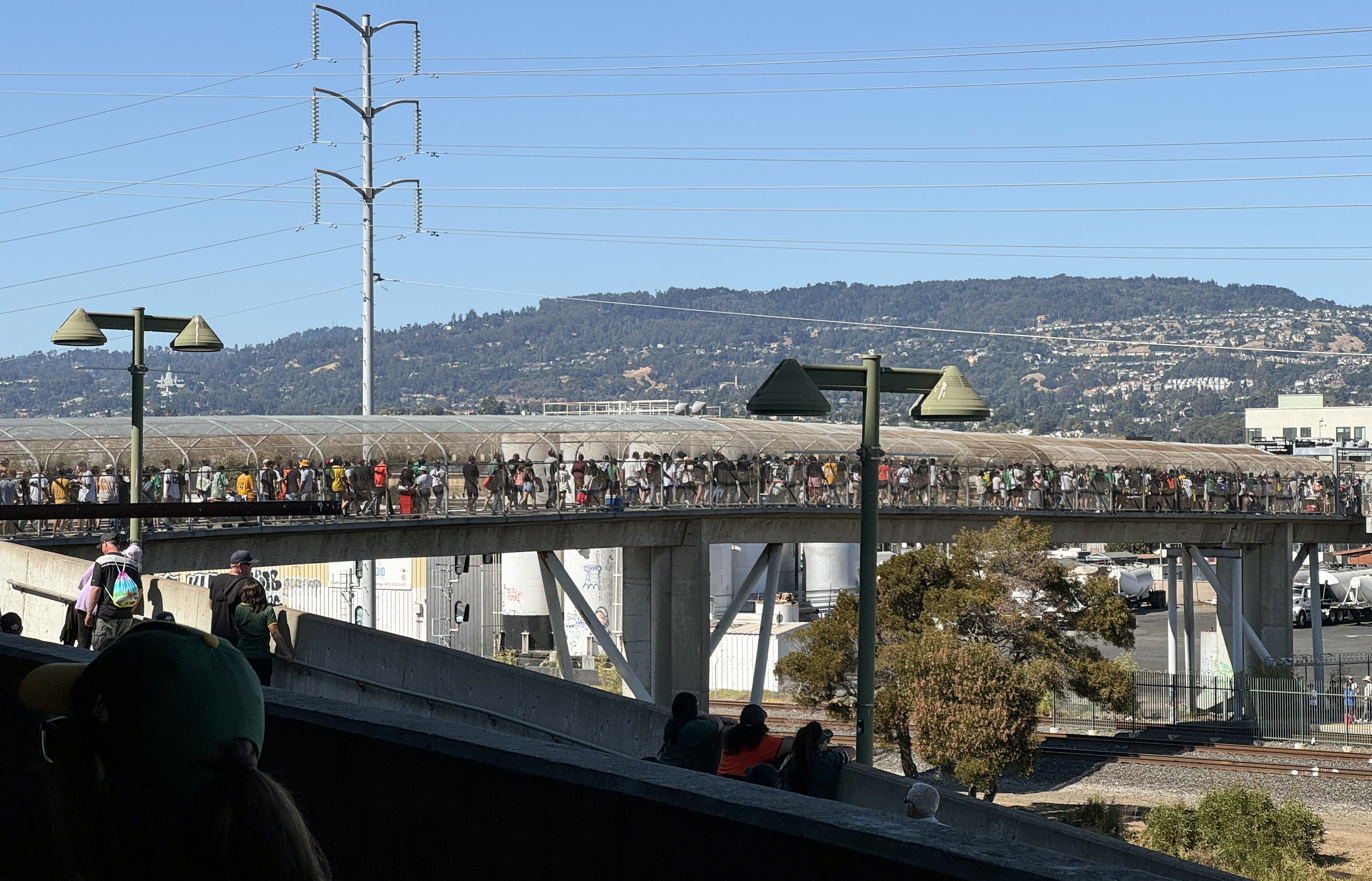
Footbridge to BART Coliseum Station

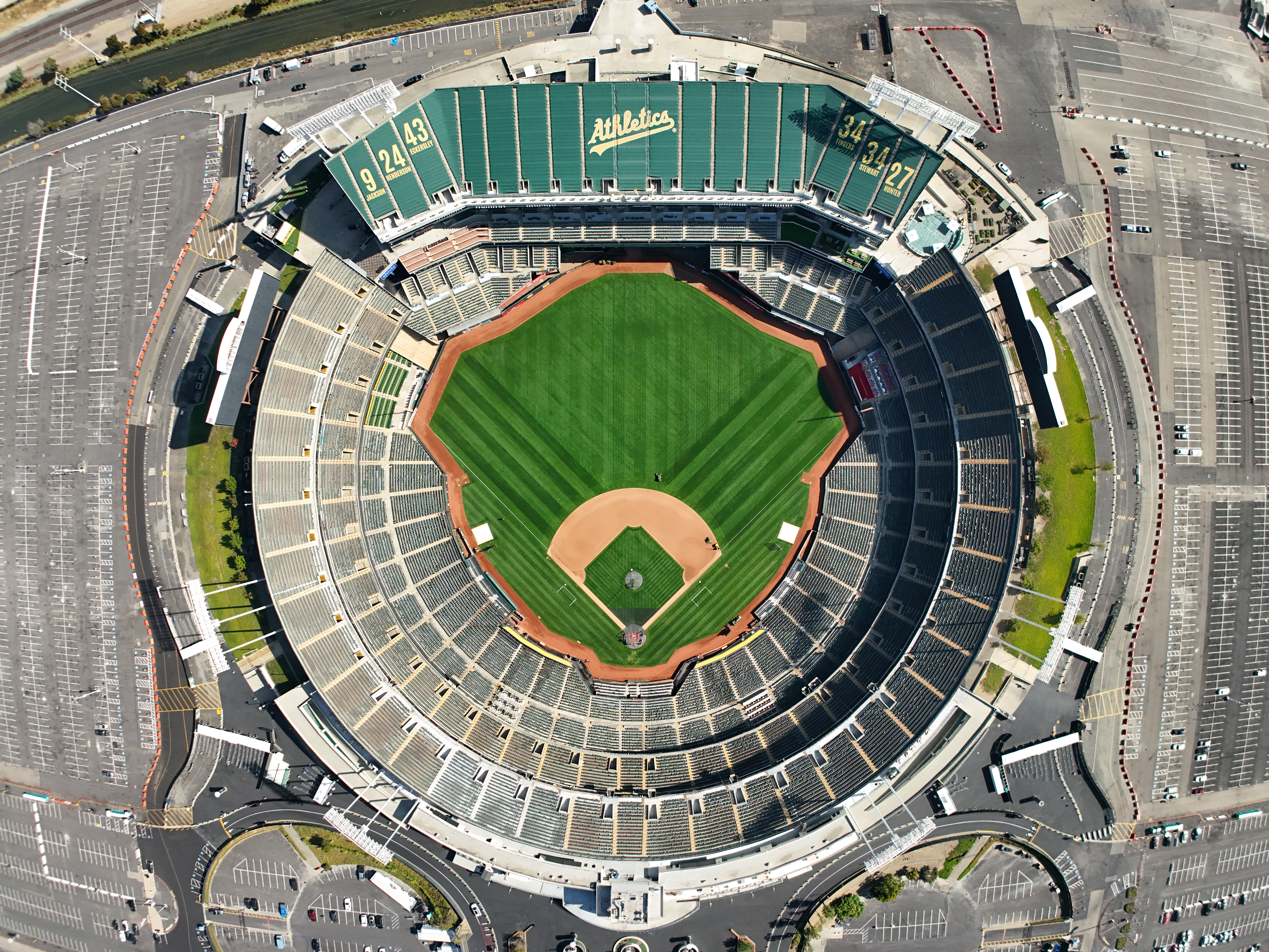
Aerial view

== Eventual replacements ==
=== Athletics ===
Athletics owner Lewis Wolff made the first official proposal for a new ballpark in Oakland to the Oakland–Alameda County Coliseum Authority on August 12, 2005. The new stadium would have been located across 66th Avenue from the Coliseum in what is currently an industrial area north of the Coliseum. The park would have held 35,000 fans, making it the smallest park in the major leagues. Plans for the Oakland location fell through in early 2006 when several of the owners of the land proposed for the new ballpark decided not to sell.

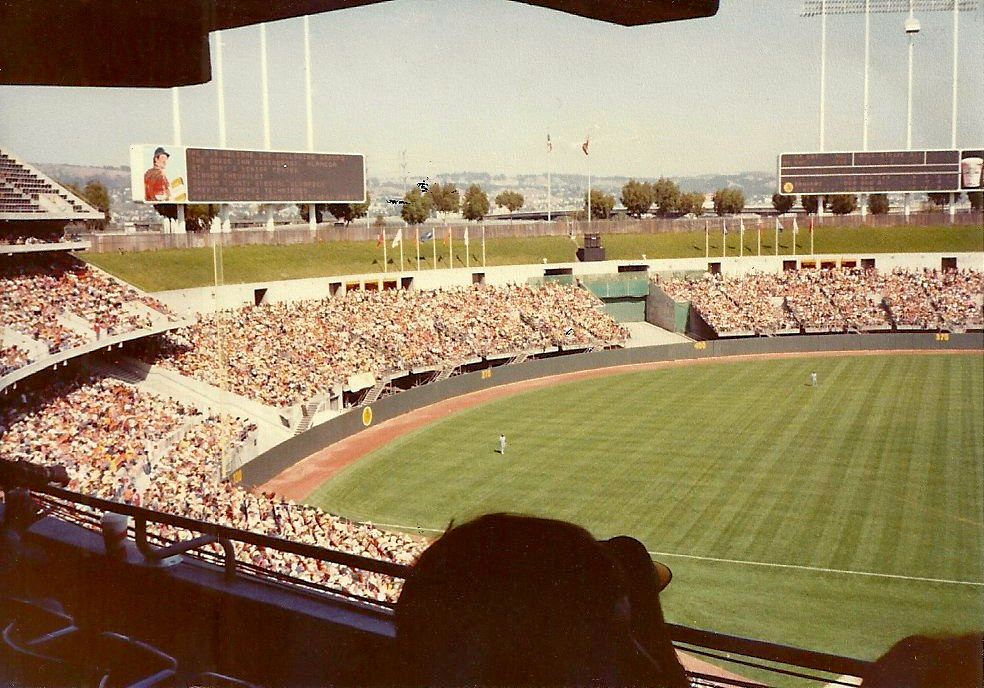
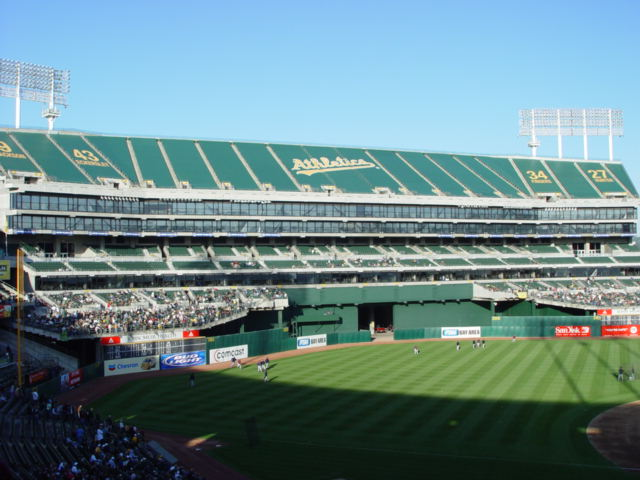

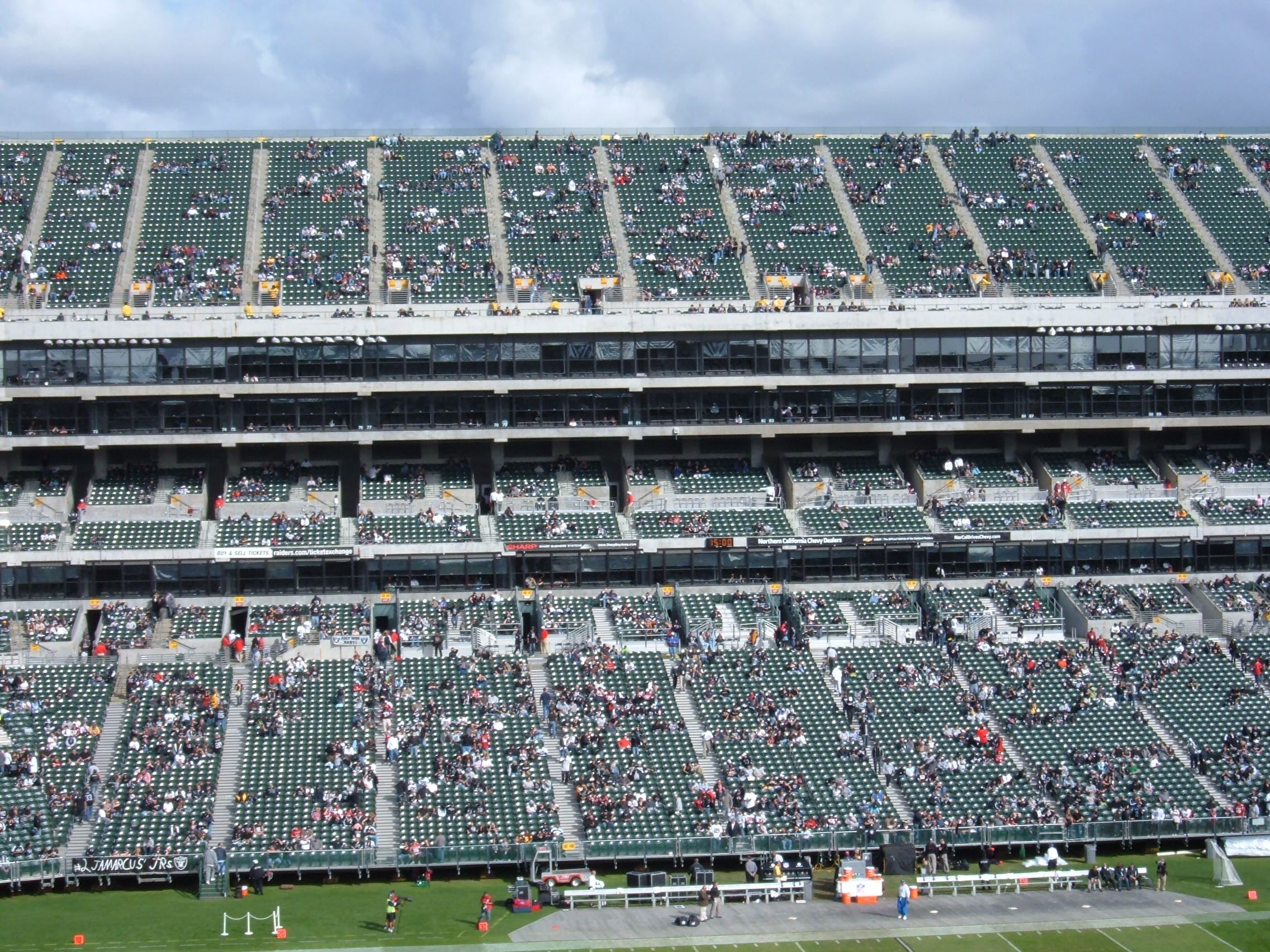
The Coliseum on July 19, 1980, before construction of the Mount Davis structure (top) and Mt. Davis during baseball season in 2006, with tarp-covered upper deck (middle); the structure during football season (bottom)

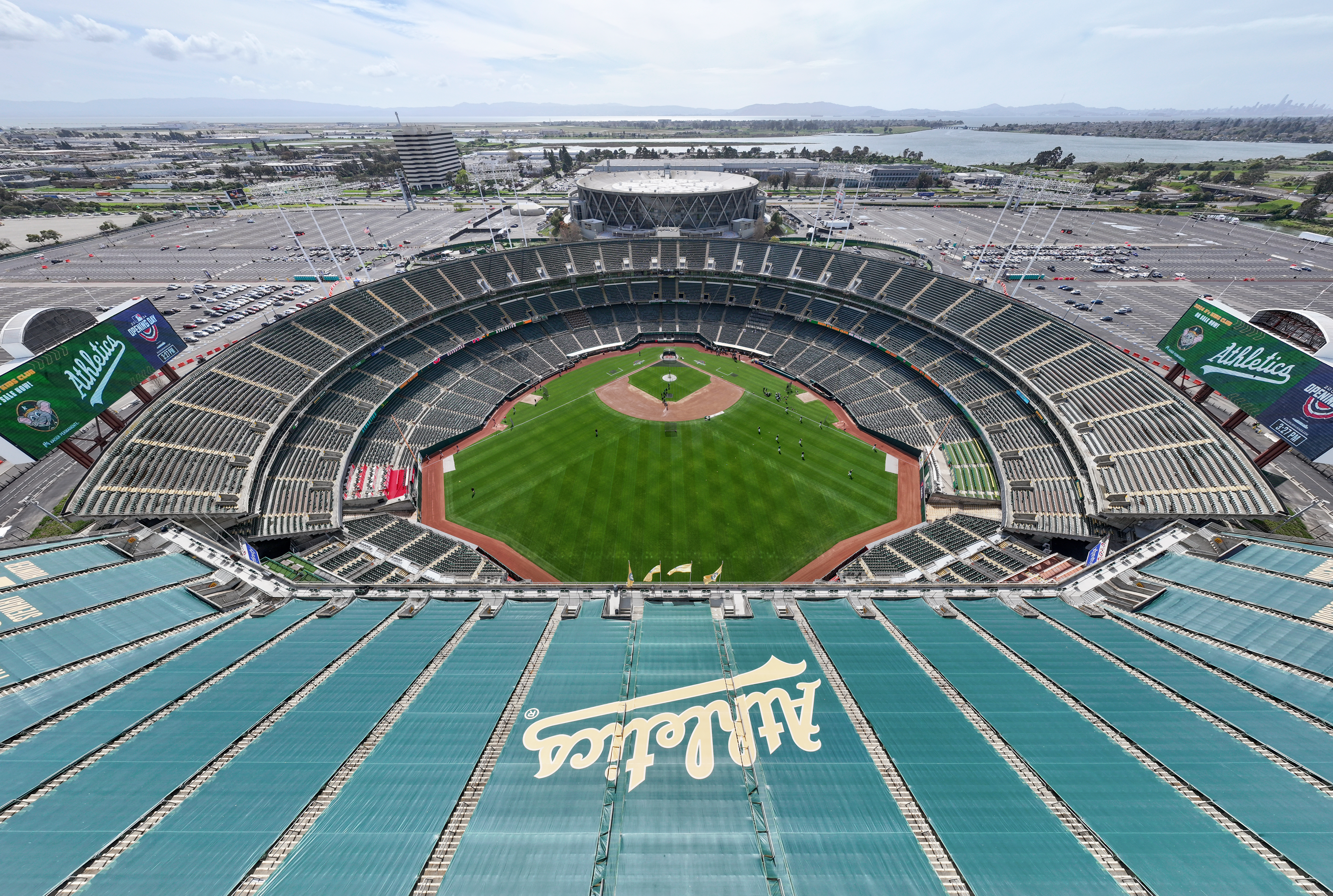
Steep sightlines from Mount Davis

Throughout 2006, the Athletics continued to search for a ballpark site within their designated territory of Alameda County. Late in 2006, rumors began to circulate regarding a 143-acre (58 ha) parcel of land in Fremont being the new site. These rumors were confirmed by the Fremont city council on November 8 of that year. Wolff met with the council that day to present his plan to move the A's to Fremont into a soon to be built ballpark named Cisco Field. Wolff and Cisco Systems conducted a press conference at the San Jose-based headquarters of Cisco Systems on November 14, 2006, to confirm the deal, and showcase some details of the future plan. However, on February 24, 2009, after delays and increased public opposition, the Athletics officially ended their search for a stadium site in Fremont. The Athletics later took their Cisco Field plan to a site in downtown San Jose located near SAP Center (home of the NHL's San Jose Sharks). The San Jose plan was opposed by the San Francisco Giants because San Jose is in their territory and on October 5, 2015, the United States Supreme Court rejected San Jose's bid on the Athletics.

During that time, the City of Oakland continued to propose new ballpark ideas that ranged from a proposal to build on a waterfront site in the Jack London Square area called Victory Court to a three stadium proposal called Coliseum City on the Coliseum site. Both plans went nowhere.

The Athletics signed a ten-year lease to stay in Oakland and at the Coliseum on July 22, 2014. The deal required that the team look into a new stadium, but only in the city limits, which made it more difficult for the Raiders to tear the Coliseum down for a football-only facility. The A's began talks with an architect on August 6, 2014, to build a baseball-only stadium at the Coliseum site, according to Wolff.

Going into 2016, John J. Fisher took majority control of the team and made Dave Kaval team president and the person in charge of the stadium hunt. On September 12, 2017, it was announced that a site near Laney College and the Eastlake neighborhood had been chosen for the new ballpark (tentatively called Oakland Ballpark) with the A's proposing to construct a 35,000-seat stadium on the site of the college's administrative buildings which the A's would relocate to a spot of the college's choosing. However, the Laney College Board of Trustees abruptly ended talks with the Athletics in December 2017. The surprised A's were forced to look at alternatives for a new stadium location.

On November 28, 2018, the Athletics announced that the team had chosen to build its 34,000-seat new ballpark at the Howard Terminal site, located about two miles west of Laney College at the Port of Oakland. The team also announced its intent to purchase the Coliseum site and make that into a technology and housing hub, preserving Oracle Arena and reducing the Coliseum to a low-rise sports park as San Francisco did with Kezar Stadium.

A turning point came in spring of 2021, when Commissioner Rob Manfred suggested that the A's look into relocation to another city after the Howard Terminal plans stalled. However, the A's said that they remained committed to staying in Oakland, and continued their efforts to get the new ballpark at Howard Terminal built. At the same time, the team eyed a possible move to Las Vegas if they could not get a new ballpark built at Howard Terminal with team representatives, Kaval and Fisher organizing multiple trips to the area to speak with local officials and business magnates and selecting the Tropicana Las Vegas hotel and resort as the site for a new venue should they relocate. The team previously played six games at Las Vegas' Cashman Field when renovations for the Coliseum were not yet complete. On April 19, 2023, the A's announced that they had agreed to purchase land from Red Rock Casino, Resort & Spa in the Las Vegas Strip for a new stadium estimated to be complete by 2027 with the backing of many within the state of Nevada and the MLB. By May 9, the Athletics' proposal was changed to the Tropicana Las Vegas instead. On June 15, Governor Joe Lombardo signed the Athletics' proposal into law through SB1 after it was passed in the Nevada State Legislature. Shortly after the bill's approval, the Athletics announced they would begin the relocation process to Las Vegas with the MLB which happened a week later. By November 16, the Athletics' move to Las Vegas was unanimously approved by the MLB during an owners meeting in Arlington, Texas.

On April 4, the A's announced 2024 would be their final season in Oakland with home games played in Sutter Health Park, the home of the AAA Sacramento River Cats, starting in 2025.

=== Raiders ===
Under any such replacement proposals, the Oakland Raiders would have presumably continued to play football in the Coliseum, although there were proposals for the Raiders to play at Levi's Stadium, the home of the San Francisco 49ers in Santa Clara as well as rumors regarding the Raiders' possible return to Los Angeles.

The Raiders proposed a 50,000-seat stadium in the same spot of the Coliseum in 2013. It would have cost $800 million, with $300 million coming from the Raiders, $200 million coming from the NFL's stadium loan program, and the final $300 million coming from the city. After the failure of the stadium plan, Raiders owner Mark Davis met with officials with the city of San Antonio on July 29, 2014, to discuss moving the Raiders to the city in time for the 2015 season; they would have temporarily played home games at the Alamodome until a new permanent stadium was built.

On September 3, 2014, the city of Oakland claimed it had reached a tentative deal to build a new football stadium in Oakland, which would have resulted in the Coliseum being demolished. The claim was met with silence from the Raiders, who continued to explore San Antonio, and opposition from Alameda County.

On February 19, 2015, the Raiders and the San Diego Chargers announced plans for a privately financed $1.7 billion stadium that the two teams would have built in Carson upon being approved to move to the Los Angeles market. Both teams said they would continue to attempt to get stadiums built in their respective cities. The stadium was approved by the Carson City Council but was defeated by the NFL who voted in favor of building Inglewood's SoFi Stadium and relocating the St. Louis Rams back to Los Angeles with the Chargers as the second L.A. team thus shutting out the Raiders from the Southern California market.

In January 2016, Mark Davis met with Las Vegas Sands owner Sheldon Adelson about building a domed stadium on the UNLV campus for the Raiders and the UNLV Rebels. The stadium location for what became known as Allegiant Stadium was later moved to a site across Interstate 15 from Mandalay Bay. After the approval of $750 million from the state of Nevada and backing from Bank of America after Adelson pulled out of the project, the Raiders submitted papers for relocation to Las Vegas in January 2017, and on March 27, the Raiders' relocation to Las Vegas was approved. The team planned to continue to play at the Coliseum through the 2019 NFL season and relocate to Las Vegas in 2020. In December 2018, the city of Oakland sued the Raiders and all the other NFL teams for millions in unpaid debts and financial damages, which prompted Raiders management to declare that the team was leaving after the 2018 season. After the 49ers blocked an attempt by the Raiders to relocate to Oracle Park for the 2019 season, the Raiders and Coliseum Authority reached an agreement in principle on February 25, 2019, to allow the Raiders to return to the Coliseum for 2019 with a provision for 2020 in case completion of Allegiant Stadium was delayed; the Coliseum Authority approved the lease on March 15 while the Alameda County Board of Supervisors and Oakland City Council voted in favor of the lease on March 19 and 21, respectively. On January 22, 2020, the Raiders officially moved to Las Vegas becoming the Las Vegas Raiders.

=== Roots and Soul ===
Oakland Coliseum during halftime of an August 2026 Roots match

In March 2024, the Oakland Roots and Oakland Soul soccer teams (of the USL Championship and USL Super League, respectively) announced their intention to move into the Coliseum for their 2025 and 2026 seasons while a soccer-specific stadium is constructed, which was previously planned to be built in the Oakland Coliseum complex, before the team began focusing on the Howard Terminal site. The Roots use 15,000 seats for most home matches in 2025, with the grass field aligned to the third base line. In addition, the Roots and Soul have continued to honor the field as Rickey Henderson Field following the namesake's death in late 2024.

== Coliseum redevelopment plan ==
The Coliseum, along with Oracle Arena and its surrounding parking lots, were owned 50% by the City of Oakland and 50% by the Athletics. The Athletics purchased their 50% share in 2018 from Alameda County, after the City of Oakland dropped a lawsuit that attempted to block the sale. As of July 2021, two Black-led redevelopment groups were vying for the chance to purchase the city's half of the site, one led by the African American Sports and Entertainment Group and the other by Dave Stewart and Lonnie Murray. In November 2021, the council voted to move forward with the plan proposed by the African American Sports and Entertainment Group. On May 23, 2024, the city of Oakland announced its plan to sell its one-half share in the existing 155-acre Oakland Coliseum complex (63 ha) for a minimum of $105 million to the African American Sports & Entertainment Group, whose plans for the site include residential and commercial uses.

== Notable events ==
=== Raiders and A's move in ===
The Raiders played their first game at the stadium on September 18, 1966. In 1968, the Kansas City Athletics moved to Oakland and began play at the stadium. The Athletics' first game was played on April 17, 1968. The stadium complex cost $25.5 million ($253 million adjusted for inflation) to build and rests on 120 acres (49 ha) of land. On April 17, 1968, Boog Powell hit the first major league home run in the history of the Coliseum. On May 8 of that year, Catfish Hunter pitched the ninth perfect game in Major League history at the Coliseum. The Coliseum hosted the 1967 and 1969 AFL championship games. Additionally, the venue had hosted the second match of the NPSL Final 1967.

=== 1970s ===
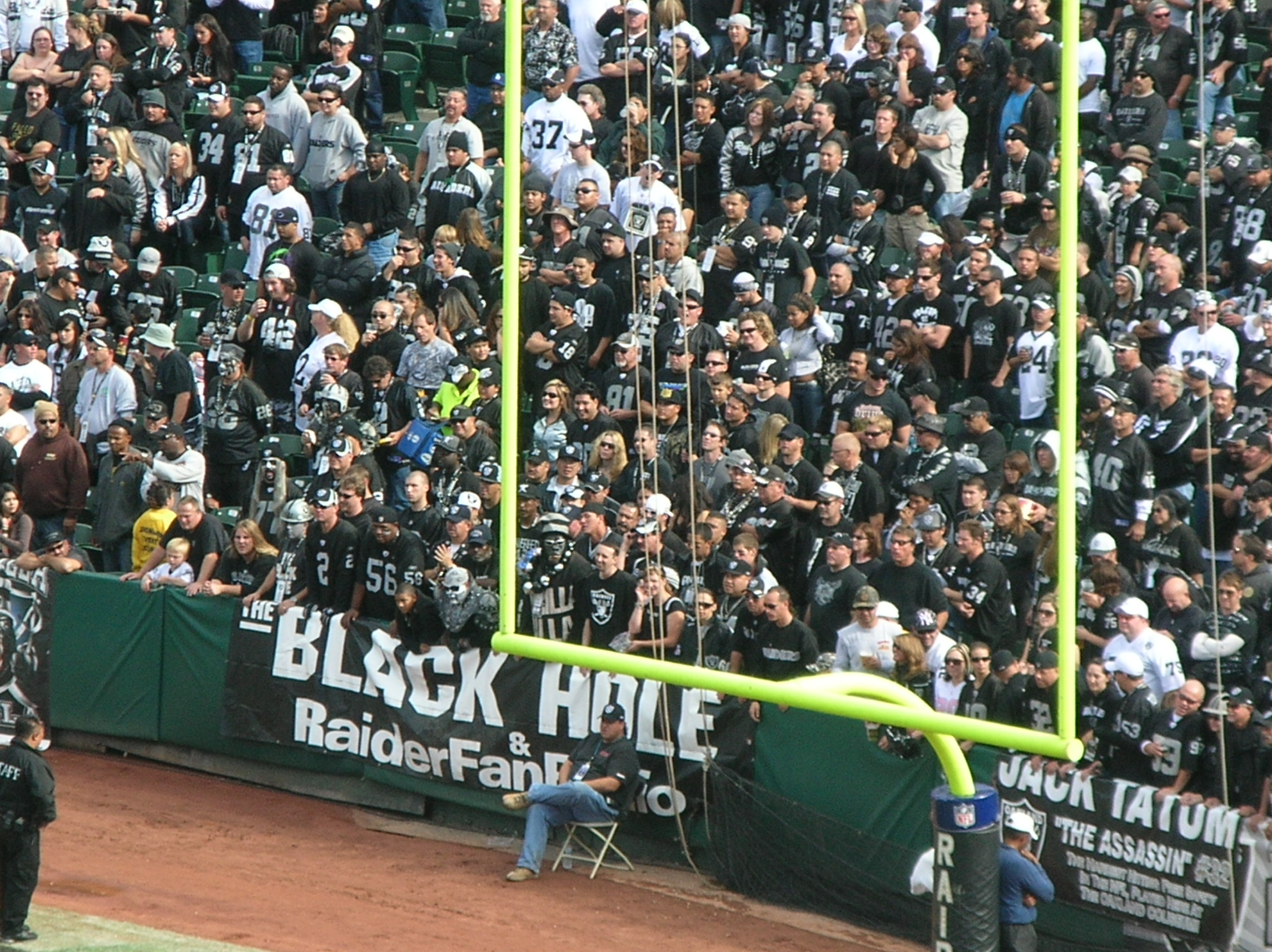
The Black Hole (sections 104, 105, 106, and 107) during a Raiders home game against the Atlanta Falcons on November 2, 2008

From 1970 to 1972 the stadium hosted three college football benefit games featuring Bay Area schools versus historically black colleges.

The Coliseum hosted the 1971 East–West Shrine Game on January 2, 1971. In 1972, the Athletics won their first of three straight World Series championships and their first since their years in Philadelphia.

The awkwardness of the baseball–football conversion, as well as the low seating capacity (around 54,000 for football) and that the prime seating on the east side consisted of temporary bleachers led the Raiders to explore other stadium options. One such option was Memorial Stadium on the UC Berkeley campus. Several preseason games were played there in the early 1970s along with one regular season game in 1973 (a 12–7 victory over the Miami Dolphins during September while the A's regular season was going on). However, in response to traffic and parking issues associated with these games (while Cal games drew a large number of students who live on or near campus and walk to the games, Raiders games attracted fans from a larger geographic area who were used to tailgating at the Coliseum and were more likely to drive to games), the City of Berkeley passed a Professional Sports Events License Tax in which the city collected 10% of all gate receipts, making the staging of professional games inside the city cost-prohibitive. The Raiders were granted an injunction from the city collecting the tax, arguing that the tax was a regulatory measure rather than a revenue measure, and was therefore an improper regulation on land held in trust by the Regents of the University of California. However, the grant of the injunction was reversed by the California Court of Appeals, who found it to be a revenue measure, despite the fact that the city had made the measure immediately effective "due to danger to the public peace, health, and safety of the City of Berkeley as a result of the holding of professional sports events there".

The stadium was not well maintained for most of the late 1970s. Its condition was most noticeable during baseball season, when crowds for A's games twice numbered fewer than 1,000. On April 17, 1979, only 653 fans attended the game versus the Seattle Mariners. During this time, it was popularly known as the "Oakland Mausoleum".

=== 1980s ===
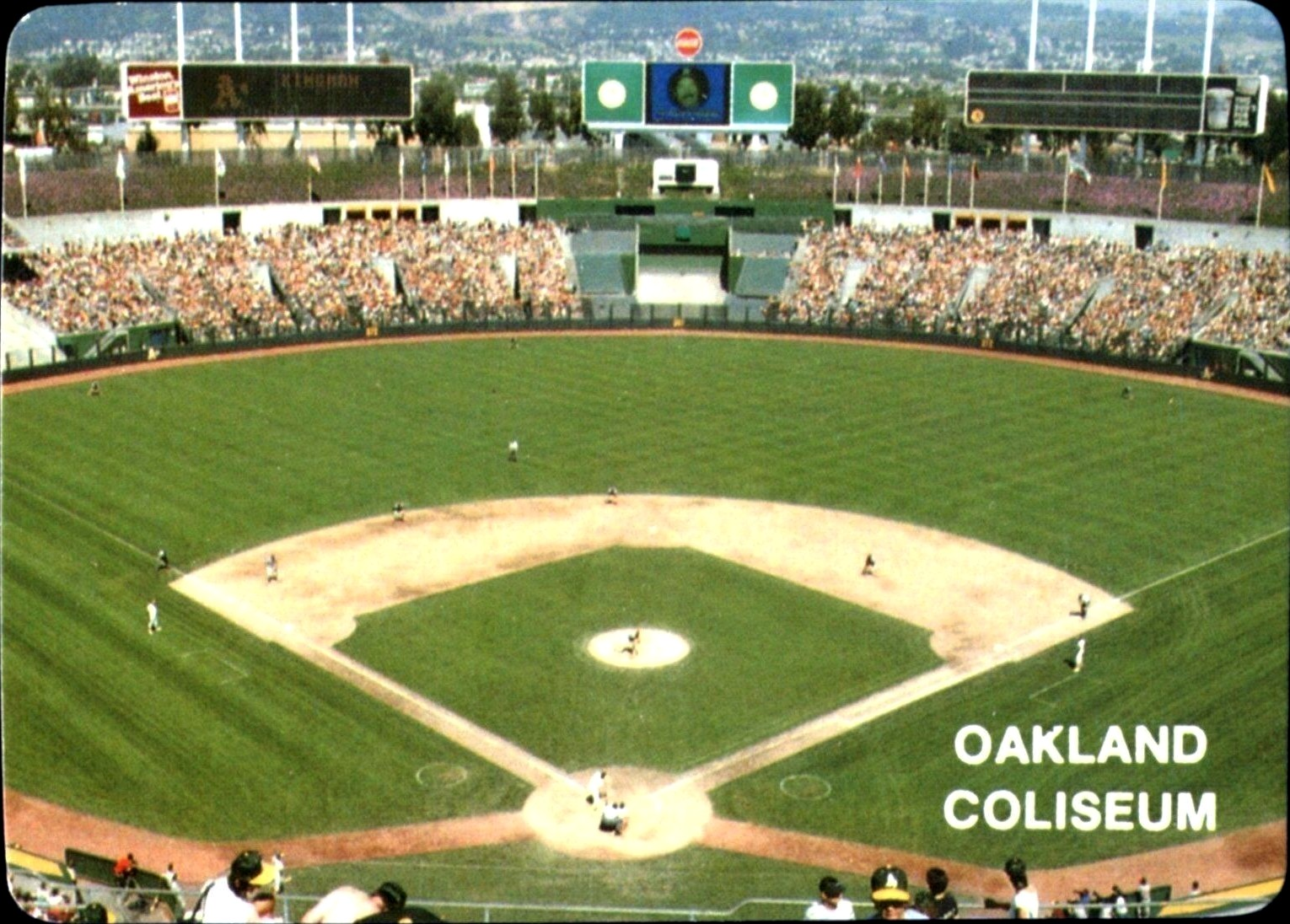
An A's game at the Coliseum in 1985

In 1980, the Raiders won Super Bowl XV. Two years later, the Raiders moved to Los Angeles, leaving the A's as the only remaining tenants of Oakland Coliseum. Only days later, Finley agreed to sell the A's to Marvin Davis, who planned to move the A's to Denver. However, city and county officials were not about to lose Oakland's status as a major league city in its own right, and refused to let the A's out of their lease. Finley sold the team instead to the owners of San Francisco-based Levi Strauss & Co. After the 1986 Major League Baseball season, the original scoreboards were replaced. A new American Sign and Indicator scoreboard and message center was installed behind the left field bleachers, while the original right field scoreboard was replaced with a manually operated out-of-town scoreboard. Between the centerfield flagpoles, a new Diamond Vision video screen was installed.

The 1987 Major League Baseball All-Star Game was held at the stadium. From 1988 to 1990, the venue saw three more World Series. In 1989, the Athletics won their 4th Series since moving to Oakland, sweeping the San Francisco Giants in the earthquake-interrupted "Battle of the Bay" Series.

=== 1990s ===
In July 1995, the Raiders agreed to return to Oakland provided that Oakland Coliseum underwent renovations. In November 1995, those renovations commenced and continued through the next summer until the beginning of the 1996 football season (more info below). The new layout also had the somewhat peculiar effect of creating an inward jog in the outfield fence, in left center and right center. There are now three distance markers instead of one, at various points of the power alleys, as indicated in the dimensions grid. The Raiders' return also heralded the creation of the "Black Hole", a highly recognizable group of fans who occupied one end zone seating during football games.

=== 2000s ===
On April 2, 2006, the broadcast booth was renamed in honor of the late Bill King, a legendary Bay Area sportscaster who was the play-by-play voice of the A's, Raiders and Warriors for 44 years.

San Jose Earthquakes of Major League Soccer, announced in November 2007 that they would be playing their "big draw" games, such as those featuring David Beckham and the Los Angeles Galaxy, at the stadium instead of their then-home Buck Shaw Stadium (capacity roughly 10,000) in Santa Clara. Since then the Quakes moved to their new home of PayPal Park and play their bigger games in either nearby Levi's Stadium or Stanford Stadium.

Midway through the decade, the stadium established a "no re-entry" policy. Each ticket can be used only once, after which a second ticket must be purchased in order to re-enter the Coliseum.

=== 2010s ===
On May 9, 2010, almost 42 years to the day of Catfish Hunter's perfect game, Dallas Braden pitched the 19th perfect game in Major League history at the Coliseum. A commemorative graphic was placed on the baseball outfield wall next to Rickey Henderson's retired number on May 17, their next home game.

With the Miami Marlins opening their own ballpark in 2012, the stadium became the last remaining venue in the United States that hosted both a Major League Baseball and a National Football League team.

As part of a new ten-year lease signed by the Athletics with the Oakland–Alameda County Coliseum Authority in 2014, the Oakland Coliseum had a new $10 million scoreboard system (two large outfield scoreboards, 36 feet tall and 145 feet wide, and two ribbon scoreboards) installed for the start of the 2015 MLB season. Also part of the new lease, the Coliseum Authority agreed to pay $1 million a year, with five percent annual increases, into a fund to maintain the stadium.

For the 2017 Major League Baseball season, the tarp covering a large amount of the baseball configuration has been removed, increasing the capacity to over 47,000 for the first time since 1995. The tarp remains on the football-only Mt. Davis.

From 2016 until 2024, the A's invested heavily in improvements to the Coliseum. In 2017 the team created a new outdoor plaza area with food trucks and lawn games, called Championship Plaza. The West Side Club was also entirely renovated and rebranded into Shibe Park Tavern (after their former home park in Philadelphia), the Coliseum's new destination restaurant and bar with more than twenty different beers on tap. In 2018, the A's created a brand new destination indoor/outdoor bar concept in the left field corner called The Treehouse. The Treehouse has brought a new demographic of fans to the Coliseum through nightly themed discounts and through its innovative subscription ticketing product, the Treehouse Pass.

On April 17, 2018, the Athletics opened the gates to the Coliseum for a free admission game versus the Chicago White Sox. It was the 50th anniversary of the club's first game played in Oakland back on April 17, 1968. 46,028 fans were on hand for the 10–2 Athletics victory and Kaval called the game "a gift to Oakland".

On December 15, 2019, the Raiders played their last scheduled game at the Coliseum, losing to the Jacksonville Jaguars by a score of 20–16, giving up 17 unanswered points in the second half. Fans booed the team as they exited the field for the last time.

=== 2020s ===
On September 6, 2020, the San Diego Padres and the Athletics played in the warmest game in the Coliseum's history. The game was played in 94-degree heat.

On June 13, 2023, Oakland A's fans organized a "Reverse Boycott" protest against the ownership's poor management of the team and attempts to relocate the franchise to Las Vegas. The attendance was 27,759 as the A's won 2–1 against the Tampa Bay Rays. Fans chanted protests such as "Sell the Team", "Fisher Sucks", and "Stay in Oakland".

On June 28, 2023, Domingo Germán of the New York Yankees threw the 24th perfect game in Major League Baseball history, defeating the Oakland Athletics 11–0 at the Coliseum. It was the third perfect game in Coliseum history after Dallas Braden in 2010 and Catfish Hunter in 1968.

The Athletics played their final game at both the Coliseum and in Oakland on September 26, 2024, winning 3–2 against the Texas Rangers in front of a sellout crowd of 46,889 fans. The team relocated to Sutter Health Park in the Sacramento area for the 2025 through 2027 seasons, with an option for the 2028 season, until their new permanent home in Las Vegas is completed.

In March 2025, Major League Cricket announced that it would host nine matches during its 2025 season at the Coliseum, including a season opener between the San Francisco Unicorns and Washington Freedom. The field was adapted for a cricket-specific configuration with 12,000 spectators and a drop-in pitch that was used in the Nassau County Stadium for the 2024 T20 World Cup. For the 2026 Major League Cricket season, the Coliseum hosted 12 regular season matches, as well as the four-match page playoff and championship match. On October 10, 2026, the Roots played their final game in the Oakland Coliseum against San Antonio FC, a 0–0 draw in front of 9,718 fans.

=== Concerts ===
Commencing in 1973, the stadium hosted an annual Day on the Green concert series, presented by Bill Graham and his company Bill Graham Presents, which continued on into the early 1990s.

In January 1974, singer Marvin Gaye used the stadium as the site for his comeback to the performance stage. His acclaimed performance was later released for the live album, Marvin Gaye Live!.

Led Zeppelin played what turned out to be their final North American concerts with twin shows during their 1977 North American Tour. Following the second show Bill Graham barred the band from the venue and his other managed venues in response to the band's manager Peter Grant, drummer John Bonham and security 'coordinator' John Bindon's brutal assault on one of Graham's security employees during the first show, following the employee's refusal to allow Grant's 11-year-old son Warren to take an item belonging to the venue as memorabilia. The death of Plant's young son Karac three days later and the resulting cancellation of the remaining tour dates rendered Graham's action academic.

Parliament-Funkadelic brought the P-Funk Earth Tour to the Coliseum on January 21, 1977. Their performance was recorded and released as a double LP set entitled Live: P-Funk Earth Tour.

Lynyrd Skynyrd played at the stadium on July 7, 1977 during their Gimme Back My Bullets Tour.

The stadium played host to Amnesty International's Human Rights Now! Benefit Concert on September 23, 1988. The show was headlined by Bruce Springsteen & The E Street Band and Peter Gabriel and also featured Tracy Chapman, Youssou N'Dour, Roy Orbison and Joan Baez.

Metallica and Guns N' Roses brought the Guns N' Roses/Metallica Stadium Tour to the Coliseum on September 24, 1992, with Body Count as their opening act.

U2 played 2 nights in June 1997 at the Oakland Coliseum as part of their PopMart tour. They were supported by Oasis, one of the first shows of their Be Here Now tour. Celine Dion played 1 night on October 13, 1998 at the Oakland Coliseum as part of her Let's Talk About Love World Tour.

The stadium played host to The Gigantour on September 8, 2006, featuring performances by Megadeth, Lamb of God, Opeth, Arch Enemy, Overkill, Into Eternity, Sanctity and The SmashUp.

U2 performed at the stadium again during their 360° Tour on June 7, 2011, with Lenny Kravitz and Moonalice as their opening acts in front of 64,829 people. The show was originally scheduled to take place on June 16, 2010, but was postponed, due to Bono's emergency back surgery.

On August 5, 2017, Green Day played a homecoming concert at the Coliseum. The show was part of the band's summer tour in support of their third number 1 album, Revolution Radio.

The stadium hosted the "Bay Area" edition of large hip-hop music festival Rolling Loud in 2018 and '19. 2019 headliners included Future, G-Eazy, Migos, and Lil Uzi Vert.

On October 1, 2021, and October 2, 2021, regional Mexican giant Los Bukis closed out their reunion tour at the Coliseum, following a 25-year hiatus. The concerts were not included in the tour at first but were eventually added due to increased demand.

=== In popular culture ===
The music video for the Huey Lewis & the News song "Jacob's Ladder" was shot at a concert at the Coliseum on December 31, 1986.

Richard Marx shot the video for "Take This Heart" on the baseball field of the Coliseum.

The stadium was the location for the 1994 Disney movie Angels in the Outfield. Although Angel Stadium of Anaheim (known as Anaheim Stadium at the time) was where the Angels actually played, it was damaged in the 1994 Southern California earthquake. Anaheim Stadium was used for views from the outside and aerial views, while the Coliseum was used for interior shots. Ironically, within two years of the film's release, the Oakland Coliseum itself would be drastically altered due to the Raiders moving back in. Meanwhile, after the Los Angeles Rams relocated to St. Louis, Anaheim Stadium was renovated to be more baseball-friendly.

The Coliseum was also used for scenes in the 2011 film Moneyball, THX 1138, Freaky Tales, and Turbo: A Power Rangers Movie.

The climax of the novel There There by Tommy Orange takes place in the Coliseum.

=== Other events ===
The stadium has hosted an AMA Supercross Championship round since 2011.

The stadium has also hosted a Monster Jam event since 2008.

== International soccer matches ==
Date	Team	Res	Team	Competition	Crowd
February 2, 1994	Russia	4–1	Mexico	International Friendly	26,019
October 23, 1996	Mexico	1–0	Ecuador	International Friendly	27,528
February 1, 1998	United States	3–0	Cuba	Gold Cup GS	11,000
February 7, 1998	United States	2–1	Costa Rica	Gold Cup GS	36,240
January 9, 2000	Mexico	2–1	Iran	International Friendly	34,289
January 27, 2000	United States	2–1	China	International Friendly	21,412
February 11, 2006	Costa Rica	1–0	South Korea	International Friendly	12,287
March 28, 2007	Mexico	4–2	Ecuador	International Friendly	20,823
July 5, 2009	Guadeloupe	2–1	Panama	Gold Cup GS	32,500
July 5, 2009	Mexico	2–0	Nicaragua	Gold Cup GS	32,500
March 26, 2011	Mexico	3–1	Paraguay	International Friendly	48,110
September 6, 2025	Mexico	0–0	Japan	International Friendly	45,278

== Criticism ==
=== Baseball ===
This view from center field shows the great distance away from the diamond

In 2011, Bleacher Report named it the fifth-worst stadium in the majors, partly due to its expansive foul territory. In 2017 The New York Times called the Coliseum "a bland, charmless concrete monstrosity" that "isn't worthy of preservation ... perhaps America's most hated sports stadium".

Two years later, in another Times article, writer Jack Nicas not only defended the Coliseum against criticism, he argued that its perceived failings were actually strengths. "The Coliseum is cheap, gritty and fun," he said. To his surprise, on moving to Oakland four years earlier, he had come to love the Coliseum as much as he had loved Fenway Park while growing up and while attending college in Boston, and Wrigley Field when he moved to Chicago after graduating college. If those parks were the baseball equivalent of classic pubs, Nicas wrote, "the Coliseum is baseball's last dive bar."

As a season ticket holder, Nicas got concessions at half price, leading to a combined cost of $7 for a hot dog and beer, a deal that he doubted could be matched anywhere else in the city. The Coliseum was also more spacious than Fenway or Wrigley, and while its expansive foul territory put fans at a distance it also allowed them more opportunities to see great catches by fielders. But while he found other A's fans who appreciated what the Coliseum had to offer and, like him, feared it would be lost in a new ballpark, he admitted those virtues had not drawn enough spectators to the Coliseum for the team to justify remaining there.

=== Public debt ===
A 1996 expansion of the stadium was funded by a controversial issuance—critics said that "(Oakland) Raiders' late owner, Al Davis, fleeced local officials at the expense of taxpayers"—of some $220 million of public debt by both Alameda County and the City of Oakland, resulting in substantial debt service payments for both governments. As of spring of 2018, the City of Oakland still owed $135 million for the expansion.

In December 2019, Alameda County officials announced the sale of the county's interest in the stadium to the Oakland A's baseball club, saying the $85 million deal would allow the county to pay off its share of the debt. In a joint statement, Supervisor Scott Haggerty and Supervisor Nate Miley noted that the two Supervisors "have led the negotiations and played instrumental roles in moving the sale of the county's share forward in the hope that, once finalized, the $85 million valuation will relieve the county of debt which has weighed on taxpayers for decades."

=== Mount Davis ===
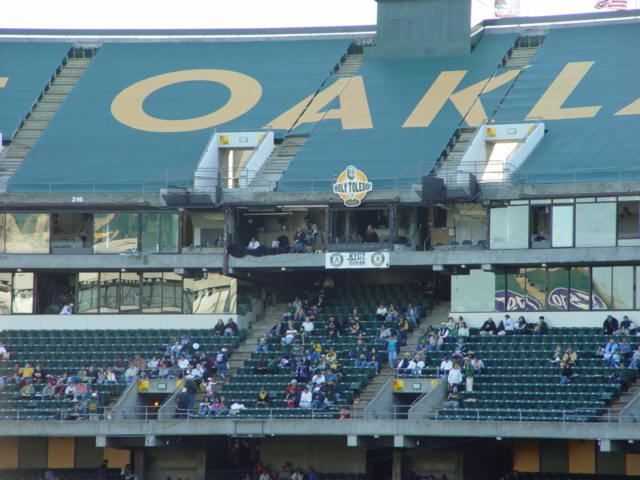
The Bill King Broadcast Booth, with a tarpaulin covering the third deck

One feature of the 1996 expansion was the addition of more than 10,000 seats in the upper deck that now spans the outfield in the baseball configuration, enclosing the stadium. Due to the stands' height and the loss of the Oakland hills view, A's fans have derisively nicknamed the structure "Mount Davis", after late Raiders owner Al Davis. It has been criticized as an area which has made the Oakland Coliseum look ever more like a football stadium, and not at all one for baseball. From 1997 to 2005, while the A's opened part of the upper deck for baseball, they did not count it as part of listed capacity; while the "official" capacity was 43,962, the "actual" capacity was 55,945.

In 2006, the Athletics covered the entire third deck with a tarp, reducing capacity to 34,077—the smallest capacity in MLB at the time. Even if a game was otherwise sold out, the A's would not sell any seats in the area. It would remain covered except if they made the World Series. The A's said that closing off the upper deck would create a "more intimate environment" for baseball. This drew criticism from fans, the Oakland City Council, and sports marketing analysts baffled at owner Lew Wolff's decision, with some stating that this was cover for a possible move to San Jose (see Cisco Field). There were 20,878 seats covered up by the tarp which would otherwise have been usable for baseball.

In February 2013, the Oakland Raiders announced that they would cover 11,000 seats in the Mount Davis section with a tarp; this reduced capacity to 53,250, making the coliseum by far the smallest in the NFL in seating capacity for its final years in the league (league rules required a minimum capacity of 50,000, and no other stadium, barring the temporary-used Dignity Health Sports Park, seated fewer than 61,000). This was done in order to potentially allow more Raiders games to be televised locally, as games are blacked out if less than 85% tickets are sold. Under NFL rules, the tarps had to stay in place all season long, even during the playoffs.

In 2017, new Athletics team President Dave Kaval decided to open several sections in the original third deck that were covered by tarps, though Mount Davis stayed tarped. This increased capacity by 12,103 to 47,170. The Athletics have since occasionally removed the tarp on Mount Davis for specific games, such as occasional Bay Bridge Series games against the San Francisco Giants, and the 2019 American League Wild Card Game against the Tampa Bay Rays. The latter set a record for attendance of a Wild Card Game, at 54,005.

=== Facility issues ===
On June 16, 2013, following the game against the Seattle Mariners, the Coliseum experienced a severe sewage backup. This led to pipes leaking out puddles of sewage into the showers, offices, visitor training room and storage areas on the clubhouse level of the stadium, all of which are 3 feet (0.91 m) below sea level. After the game, the A's and Mariners were forced to share the Oakland Raiders locker room, located on the stadium's second floor. According to Coliseum officials, the stadium's aging plumbing system was overtaxed after a six-game homestand that drew close to baseball capacity crowds totaling 171,756 fans.

This was not the first time sewage problems cropped up at the stadium. On one occasion, the Los Angeles Angels complained about E. coli in the visiting team's training room after a backup. Backups occur even when no events are taking place there. For instance, Lew Wolff wanted to go to dinner on June 12, 2013 (while the A's were on the road) at one of the Coliseum's restaurants, only to discover that food service had been halted due to a sewage leak in the kitchen.

Since 2014, it has been presumed that a family of opossums live inside the stadium. On at least two separate occasions during the 2014 season, a opossum scurried onto the field during an A's game. The A's won both those games, leading fans to embrace the animal as the "Rally Possum". By 2022, opossums were still known to be living inside the stadium, and in 2023, a opossum was seen in the away team broadcast booth. For the beginning of the 2023 season, the broadcast crews for visiting teams would be forced to move to a smaller booth due to droppings left by opossums in the normal booth.

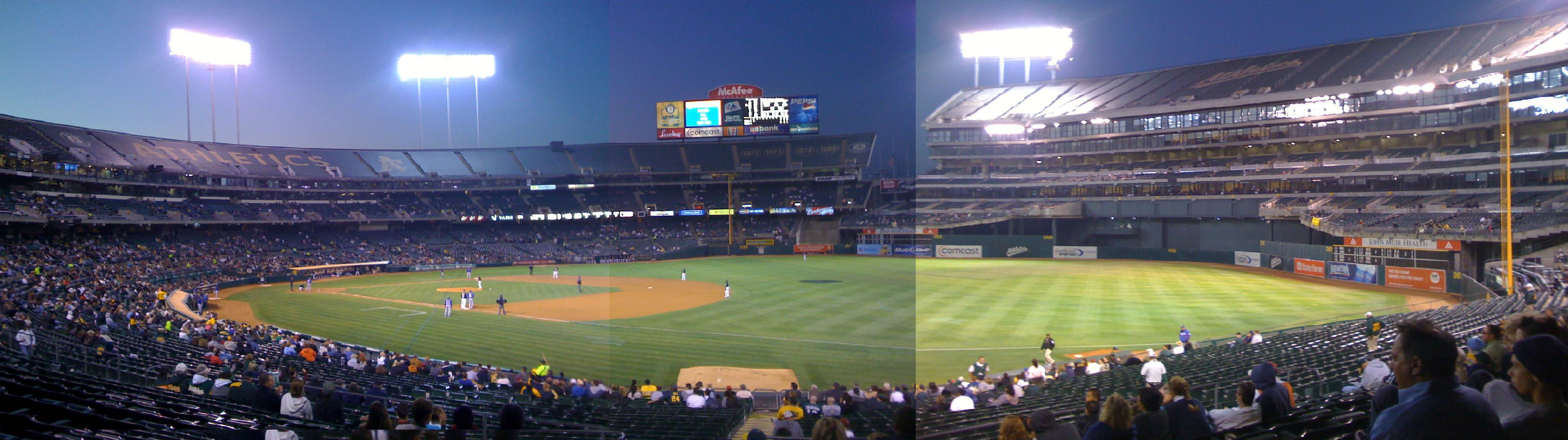
The Coliseum during A's game in September 2008
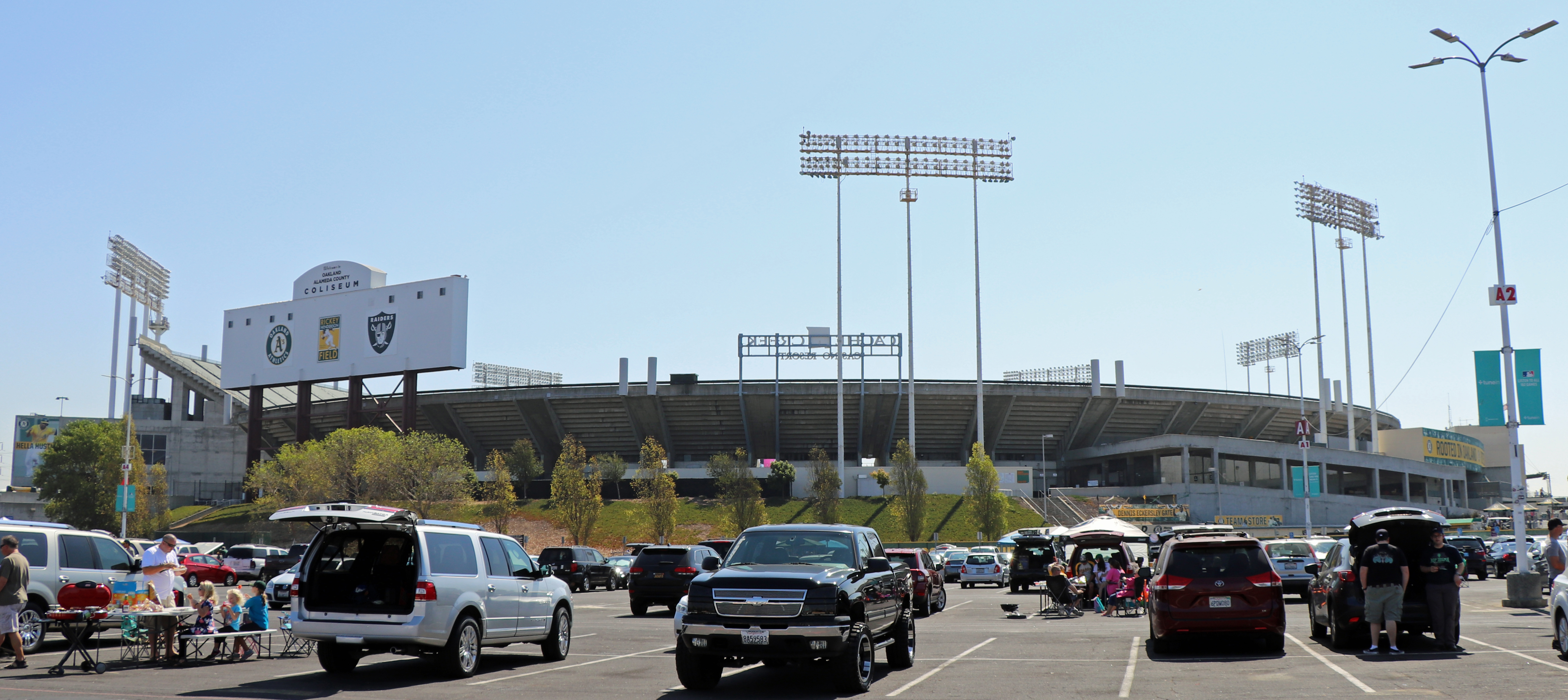
Oakland Coliseum Exterior – September 10, 2017

== See also ==
- Sports in the San Francisco Bay Area

Events and tenants
Preceded by Municipal Stadium	Home of the Oakland Athletics; 1968–2024	Succeeded by Sutter Health Park
Preceded by Frank Youell Field; Los Angeles Memorial Coliseum	Home of the Oakland Raiders; 1966–1981; 1995–2019	Succeeded by Los Angeles Memorial Coliseum; Allegiant Stadium
Preceded by Astrodome	Host of the Major League Baseball All-Star Game; 1987	Succeeded by Riverfront Stadium
Preceded by Pioneer Stadium	Home of the Oakland Roots SC; 2025–present	Succeeded by Current
Preceded by Spartan Stadium	Home of the San Jose Earthquakes (with Buck Shaw Stadium); 2008–2009	Succeeded by Buck Shaw Stadium
Preceded by Miami Orange Bowl; Three Rivers Stadium; Alltel Stadium; Heinz Field	Host of AFC Championship Game; 1975; 1977; 2001; 2003	Succeeded by Three Rivers Stadium; Mile High Stadium; Heinz Field; Gillette Stadium
