= Spite fence =

Boundary developed to make a neighbor's property worse

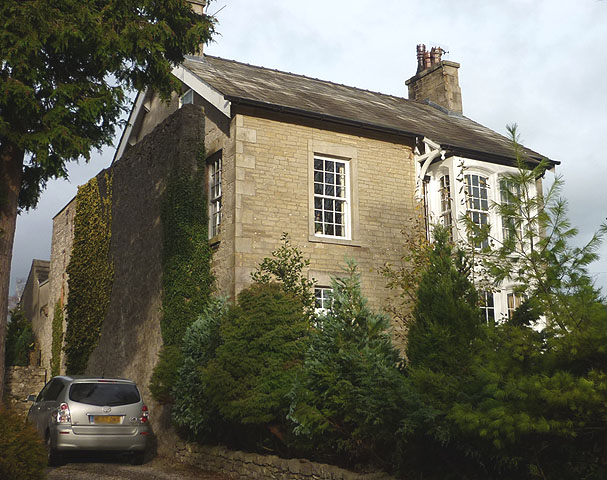
A spite wall in Lancashire, England, built in 1880 by the owner of the land on the left, in reaction to the unwanted construction of the house on the right

In property law, a spite fence is an overly tall fence or a row of trees, bushes, or hedges, constructed or planted between adjacent lots by a property owner (with no legitimate purpose), who is annoyed with or wishes to annoy a neighbor, or who wishes to completely obstruct the view between lots. Several U.S. states and local governments have regulations to prohibit spite fences, or related regulations such as those establishing a maximum allowed height for fences. In the United Kingdom, the terms spite wall or blinder wall (as in, to blind the view of a neighbor) are more commonly used.

== Law ==
Courts have said, "[u]nder American rule... one may not erect a structure for the sole purpose of annoying his neighbor. Many courts hold that a spite fence which serves no useful purpose may give rise to an action for both injunctive relief and damages." Sundowner, Inc. v. King is a classic spite fence case. In this case from Idaho, the defendant King, bought a motel from the plaintiff (Bushnell). Bushnell then built another motel (Desert Inn) on the property right next to the motel they had sold to the Kings. In response to this, the Kings built an 18-foot fence raised 2 feet off the ground that was 2 feet from Desert Inn. The structure severely restricted air and light into Desert Inn's rooms. Bushnell sued and the court found that the fence served no useful purpose to the Kings and that it was built primarily because the Kings vehemently disliked the Bushnell's actions. The court ordered the structure's height be reduced dramatically.

If the structure is found to serve a useful purpose then it may not be considered a spite fence. In one case, a man built a 13-foot (4.0 m) fence on his property, and his neighbor sued him. The man had put up a fence that tall because his neighbor kept throwing garbage over the old (shorter) fence. Since keeping garbage out of one's yard is a legitimate reason to have a fence, it was found not to be a spite fence.

Several states in the United States have laws that prohibit planting a row of trees parallel to a property line, which exceed six to ten feet (1.8 to 3.0 m) in height, which block a neighbor's view or sunlight. The courts have ruled that a row of trees can be considered a "fence".

Golf courses near residential communities will often have fences exceeding 20 ft (6.1 m) in height in order to prevent struck balls from flying out of the course and into the windshields of cars and windows of houses near the course. Such fences are not spite fences, and may actually be required. Outdoor arenas and amphitheatres also often use fences or other obstructions to prevent the viewing of their events by those who do not have tickets (which, although it may be unpopular with those whose free viewing is obstructed, is not necessarily spiteful).

In civil-law countries, erecting a spite wall (or a spite house) is unequivocally prohibited because of the doctrine of abuse of rights: a right ends where abuse begins. This is mostly attributable to the fact that modern building regulations often prevent any construction likely to impinge on neighbours' views or privacy. In some countries, such as Finland, construction of any such structures is explicitly prohibited in the law (Neighbour Relations Act 13§).

== Examples ==
=== California ===
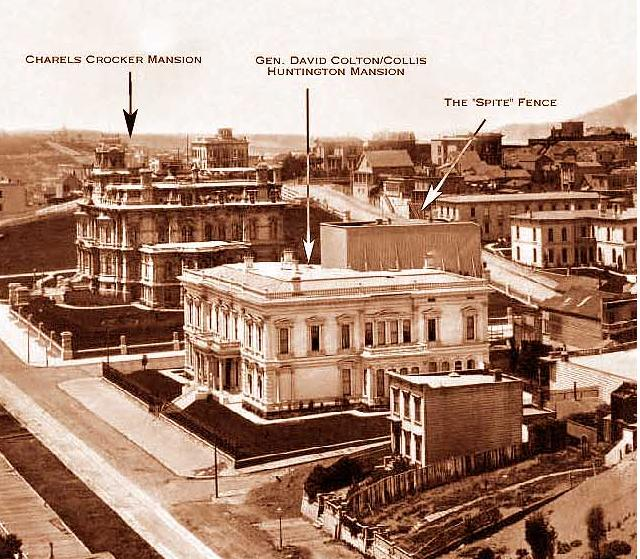
Portion of the April 1878 panoramic photograph of San Francisco by Eadweard Muybridge showing the spite fence constructed by Charles Crocker

Railroad investor Charles Crocker owned a house on Nob Hill in San Francisco. Unable to purchase the house of his neighbour, Nicholas Yung, he built a fence which was high enough to spoil Yung's view. The work features in the April 1878 panoramic photo of San Francisco by Eadweard Muybridge.

In the California case of Wilson v. Handley, 97 Cal. App. 4th 1301 (2002), Wilson built a second story onto her log cabin. Her neighbor, Handley, did not like this addition, and retaliated by planting a row of evergreen trees, parallel to the property line, that would grow some day to purposely block Wilson's view of Mount Shasta. Wilson sued Handley for blocking her view. The California Court of Appeals ruled that trees planted parallel to a property line, to purposely block a neighbors' view, constitutes a spite fence and a private nuisance, and is illegal under California Civil Code (Section 841.4). The court further noted that bushes or hedges exceeding six feet (1.8 m) in height in California (six to ten feet (1.8 to 3.0 m) in other states) that block a neighbor's view are also a "spite fence" and a private nuisance.

=== Ireland ===
Examples in Ireland include Marino Crescent in Dublin and "The Jealous Wall" at Belvedere House and Gardens in County Westmeath.

=== Pennsylvania ===
In the 1930s, an outfield fence on Shibe Park baseball stadium in Philadelphia was raised to 34 feet in order to block a view of the field from the rooftops of a neighboring street, which had become a popular site for spectators. The structure became known as "Connie Mack’s Spite Fence" after the home team's manager, and reduced the goodwill the team had had with its neighbors.

=== Utah ===
In 2008 a farmer in Hooper, Utah, placed three old cars upright in the ground, after a dispute with his neighbors, who objected to the flies, mosquitoes and dust from his farm yet also rejected his proposal to build a fence between their property and his farm. The farmer described the construction as 'Redneck Stonehenge'.

=== United Kingdom ===
- The Manor House, Leg Square, Shepton Mallet, Somerset
- 22 Gloucester Road, Thornbury, Bristol
- Stankelt Road, Silverdale, Lancashire

== See also ==
- Air rights
- Nail house
- Right to light
- Solar Shade Control Act
