= Shibe Park =

Baseball stadium

Shibe Park / Connie Mack Stadium
- Shibe Park in Philadelphia in the 1960s
- Interactive map of Shibe Park / Connie Mack Stadium
- Former names: Shibe Park (1909–1953); Connie Mack Stadium (1953–1976)
- Location: N 21st St & W Lehigh Ave, Philadelphia, Pennsylvania 19132
- Coordinates: 39°59′46″N 75°9′54″W
- Capacity: 23,000 (1909–1924); 33,500 (1925); 27,500 (1926–1927); 28,250 (1928); 30,000 (1929); 33,000 (1930–1946); 32,750 (1947); 33,166 (1948–1955); 33,359 (1956–1960); 33,608 (1961–1970)
- Surface: Grass
- Field size: (1909); Left Field – 360 ft (Opening day), 378 ft (Late 1909); Center Field Corner – 515 ft Right Field – 340 ft (1925); Left Field – 334 ft Center Field Corner – 468 ft Right Field – 331 ft (1950); Left Field – 334 ft Deep Left Center – 420 ft Center Field – 447 ft Deep Right Center – 405 ft Right Field – 329 ft (1968); Left Field – 334 ft Deep Left Center – 387 ft Center Field – 410 ft Deep Right Center – 390 ft Right Field – 329 ft

Construction
- Groundbreaking: 1908
- Opened: April 12, 1909
- Closed: October 1, 1970
- Demolished: 1976
- Cost: $301,000 ($10.8 million in 2025 dollars)
- Architect: William Steele & Sons

Tenants
- Philadelphia Athletics (AL) (1909–1954); Philadelphia Phillies (NL) (1938–1970); Philadelphia Eagles (NFL) (1940, 1942–1957); Philadelphia Stars (NNL) (1943)

Pennsylvania Historical Marker
- Designated: November 1, 1997

Shibe Park (/ʃaɪb/ SHYBE, rhymes with "vibe"), known later as Connie Mack Stadium, was a ballpark located in Philadelphia. It was the home of the Philadelphia Athletics of the American League (AL) from 1909 to 1954 and the Philadelphia Phillies of the National League (NL) from 1938 to 1970.

When the stadium opened April 12, 1909, it became baseball's first steel-and-concrete stadium. Over several eras, it was home to "The $100,000 Infield", "The Whiz Kids", and "The 1964 Phold". The venue's two home teams won both the first and last games at the stadium: the Athletics beat the Boston Red Sox 8–1 on opening day 1909, while the Phillies beat the Montreal Expos 2–1 on October 1, 1970, in the park's final contest.

Shibe Park stood on the block bounded by Lehigh Avenue, 20th Street, Somerset Street and 21st Street. It was five blocks west, corner-to-corner, from the Baker Bowl, the Phillies' home from 1887 to 1938. The stadium hosted eight World Series and two MLB All-Star Games, in 1943 and 1952, with the latter game holding the distinction of being the only All-Star contest shortened by rain (to five innings). In May 1939, it was the site of the first night game played in the American League.

Phillies Hall-of-Fame centerfielder and longtime broadcaster Richie Ashburn remembered Shibe Park: "It looked like a ballpark. It smelled like a ballpark. It had a feeling and a heartbeat, a personality that was all baseball."

== History ==
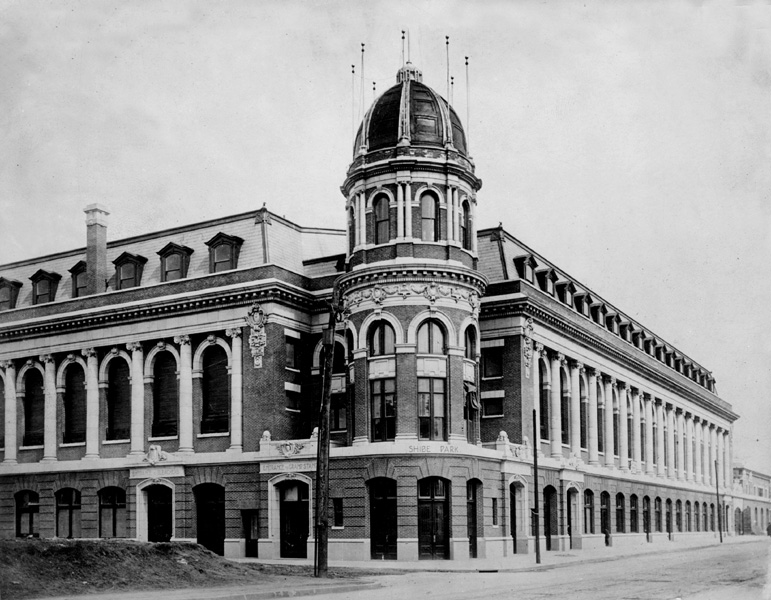
The Steeles' French Renaissance design included a signature tower and cupola, 1909

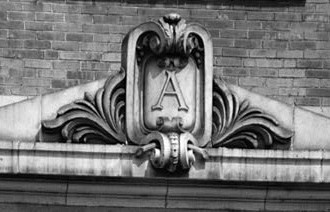
Cartouches above the entrances along Lehigh Ave and 21st St framed the A's logo

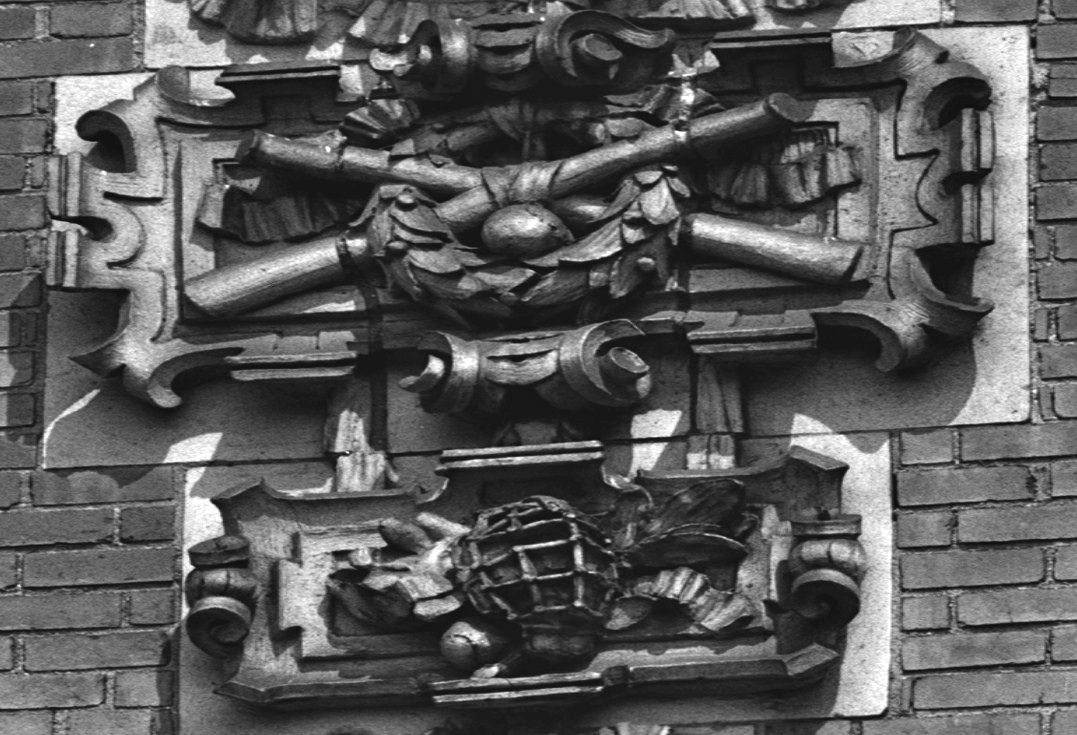
Bats, balls – even a catcher's mask – adorned exterior walls in terra cotta casts

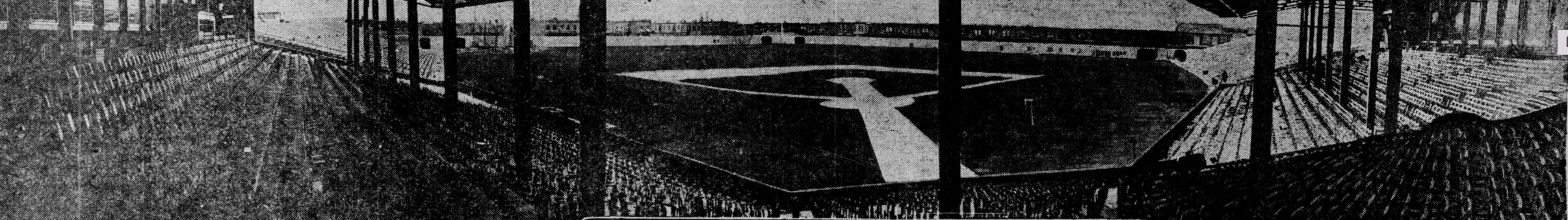
Shibe Park on March 13, 1909, one month prior to first game

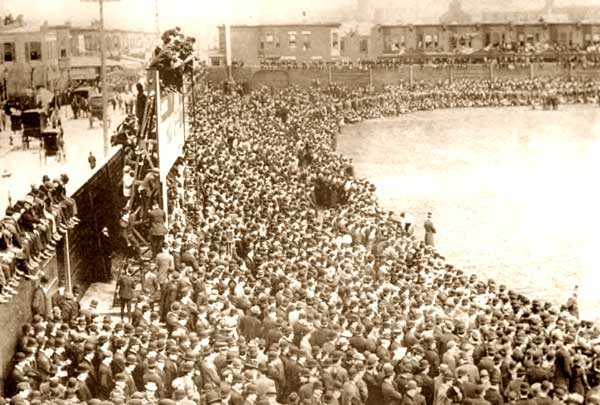
Fans watching the inaugural game, April 12, 1909. Somerset St. at left; 20th St homes at right. The A's prevailed over Boston, 8–1

=== 1907: Design and construction ===
In the early years of the 20th century, the Philadelphia Athletics were so popular that team president Ben Shibe found his team regularly turning away customers from their cramped Columbia Park ballpark even though it was just a few years old. When as many as 28,000 showed up to fill the 9,500 wooden bleacher seats, Shibe and manager/part-owner Connie Mack decided the A's needed a new place to play.

He searched for a site for his new park and found one on Lehigh Avenue between 20th and 21st Streets, five blocks west of Baker Bowl, straddling the neighborhoods known as Swampoodle and Goosetown. It was still primitive at the time, an area of "high clay bluffs, rain-washed gullies, quagmires, open fields, even ponds" where chickens pecked and pigs rooted. Although a grid of streets was planned for the area, few actually existed. The area was already served by public transportation: trolleys ran up and down Broad Street and back and forth along Lehigh, and both the Pennsylvania and Reading railroads had major stations nearby. The area had "underachieved" thus far due to the presence of the city's Hospital for Contagious Diseases (the "smallpox hospital") a block west on Lehigh, but Shibe's privileged connections in town brought him word that the city would be closing the facility. Without the hospital, the area's stigma would eventually dissipate, but at the time, the land was still a bargain.

Shibe quietly assembled title to his square block of land early in 1907, picking up parcels "through a complicated series of acquisitions, preventing price inflation by masking his intentions," even using straw buyers to keep his name out of the dealings. He spent a total of $67,500 ($2.42 million in 2025 dollars) on seven land packages totaling 5.75 acres (2.33 ha), and in February 1908, he arranged to have two projected streets running through his block dropped from the city plan.

For the design and its execution, Shibe hired William Steele and Sons. Their engineering staff had worked with the new technology of steel-reinforced concrete, and designed and built the city's first skyscraper, the Witherspoon Building at Walnut and Juniper Streets. The Steele design for the Shibe façade was in the ornate French Renaissance style, including arches, vaultings, and Ionic pilasters. The grandstand walls were to be of red brick and terra cotta and featured elaborate decorative friezes with baseball motifs, while cartouches framed the Athletics' "A" logo at regular intervals above the entrances. The souvenir program on Opening Day called it "a fetching combination of color." Gabled dormer windows on the upper deck's copper-trimmed green-slate mansard roof looked out over the streets below. Presiding over all were terra cotta busts of Shibe and Mack above the main entrances on Lehigh and 21st.

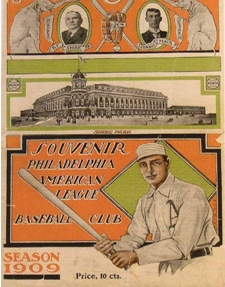
Messrs. Shibe and Mack are top-billed on 1909 A's yearbook

The signature feature of the exterior design was the octangular tower on the southwest corner. The upper floors would accommodate the A's offices, those of Shibe's sons Jack and Tom, who ran the day-to-day business aspects of the team, and the domed cupola on the very top were to house Mack's office. On the ground floor was a main entrance lobby. Bobby Shantz, pitcher for the A's in their last years at Shibe, wrote that the corner tower entrance "looked almost like a church." Shibe was proud of the egalitarianism of the design; he said it was "for the masses as well as the classes." In April 1908, design in hand, the Shibes and the Steeles broke ground. With the resources of the Steele firm, construction was speedy, efficient and completed in time to open the 1909 season.

The city was excited about its new ballpark—the Philadelphia Public Ledger called it "a palace for fans, the most beautiful and capacious baseball structure in the world." American League president Ban Johnson pronounced that "Shibe Park is the greatest place of its character in the world." In more recent times, baseball author David M. Jordan wrote that it was "a splendid forerunner of others like it ... Ben Shibe and the Steeles initiated 'the golden age of ballparks'."

The original 1909 configuration was a double-deck grandstand in the southwest corner of the block, with open pavilion seating extending to the foul poles. The outfield was a large rectangle, surrounded by a 12-foot (3.7 m) brick wall that bordered the streets. The deepest part of center field was a square corner 515 feet (157 m) from home plate. It was 378 to the left field foul marker, and 340 to right field. The slight upslope of the land from south to north was reflected in a small "terrace" that ran across left and center field. The upper deck was built of wood mounted on steel girders, while the lower deck was built of concrete and steel. The only link with the Columbia Park was the transplanted sod, rolled out at the new venue. The 1909 seating capacity certainly was an upgrade from Columbia Park: 11,000 in the double deck and 12,000 in the two pavilions, for a total of 23,000. Overflow crowds were accommodated by roping off the left field area in front of the wall. Some 500 tons of steel went into the construction.

=== April 1909: "Play ball!" ===
On Monday, April 12, 1909, the Opening Day proceedings walked a fine line between festival and chaos. More than 30,000 fans showed up and got in; another 15,000 showed up and were turned away. Nervous officials closed the gates hours before game time, turning the outsiders into a "howling mob of thousands" whose pressure forced open one of the gates. Hundreds poured in without paying admission, and an estimated 7,000 standing-room only spectators saw that first game ringing the outfield up to seven-deep, held back by a rope stretched between the left field seats and the right field bleacher. Another 6,000 more looked in from various rooftops around the block. "It seemed as if all of Philadelphia was there", wrote the Public Ledger. Mayor John E. Reyburn called the new facility a "pride to the city" and threw out the first ball. The A's beat the Boston Red Sox that day, 8–1.

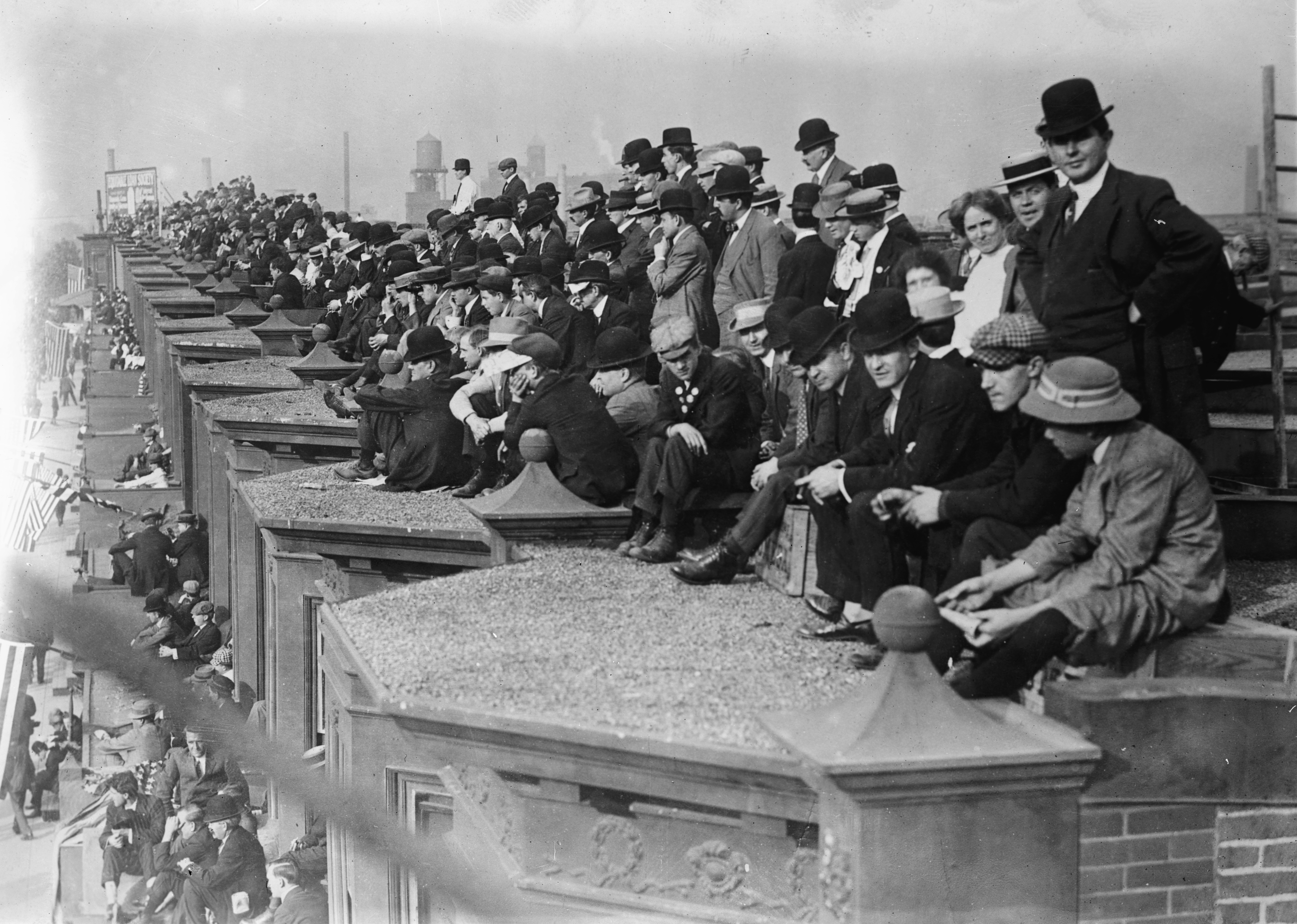
1910 brought the first World Series—and rooftop bleachers across 20th St. from the park, a 25-year dispute between neighbors

The Athletics and their new stadium were a hit: the A's won pennants—and brought World Series to town—in 1910 and 1911, and by 1913, when they would win another, Shibe initiated the first of the expansions of seating capacity that would continue right on through the 1950s. He called again upon the Steele company and added a new unroofed bleacher section across left field, taking advantage of the site's rectangular, rather than square, shape, and also added roof structures to cover the open pavilions down the first base and third base lines.

After Ben Shibe's death in 1922, sons Tom and Jack became president and vice president, respectively. and in 1925 they replaced the 1913 open left field bleachers with a double-deck that extended from the foul pole to the center field corner. This construction covered the "terrace" except in the deepest part of center field which still had a slight upslope. Where the upper deck of the main stands abutted the upper deck of the bleachers, there was a slight overhang. Whether this ever affected play is unknown. They also extended the upper deck out over the pavilions. These expansions resulted in another 10,000 seats. In 1928, the brothers installed a mezzanine that added 750 pricey box seats and the following year they raised the original grandstand roof and installed a press box underneath it, along with 3,500 more seats.

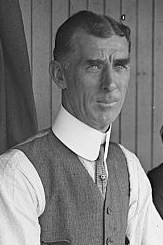
A's manager half a century, Mack wore a suit and starched collar, never his team's uniform

For the 1923 season, Connie Mack had the infield moved back an estimated 21 feet (6.4 m). This was a choice of speed over power, as moving the plate back increased left field and right field dimensions by 15 feet (4.6 m) each. Home runs dropped about 50% for the next three seasons. The Shibe brothers moved it back to its original position, resulting in field dimensions of 331 feet (101 m) to right field, 334 to left, and 468 to the square corner in center.

In 1936, A's President Tom Shibe died, and Connie Mack succeeded in gaining control of the team by buying out Tom Shibe's share from his widow. The move made the Mack family the controlling partner in 1937, though various Shibe family members still had "considerable holdings" in the team.

More renovation—and a round of controversy—came after the 1938 season when Mack sought to install light towers for night play, which local residents were against. They objected in general to the light, noise and traffic that night games would bring to the neighborhood, and objected specifically to the danger of home run balls hitting them as they sat on their porches and to the ability of fans in the upper decks to peer into their bedrooms at night. The matter went to court, and Mack hired a young Philadelphia lawyer to plead his case. The presentation of young Richardson Dilworth, future mayor of the city, carried the day: the A's won the case and the light towers went up in time for the 1939 season. The first night game in the AL was at Shibe Park on May 16, 1939: the Indians beat the A's, 8–3.

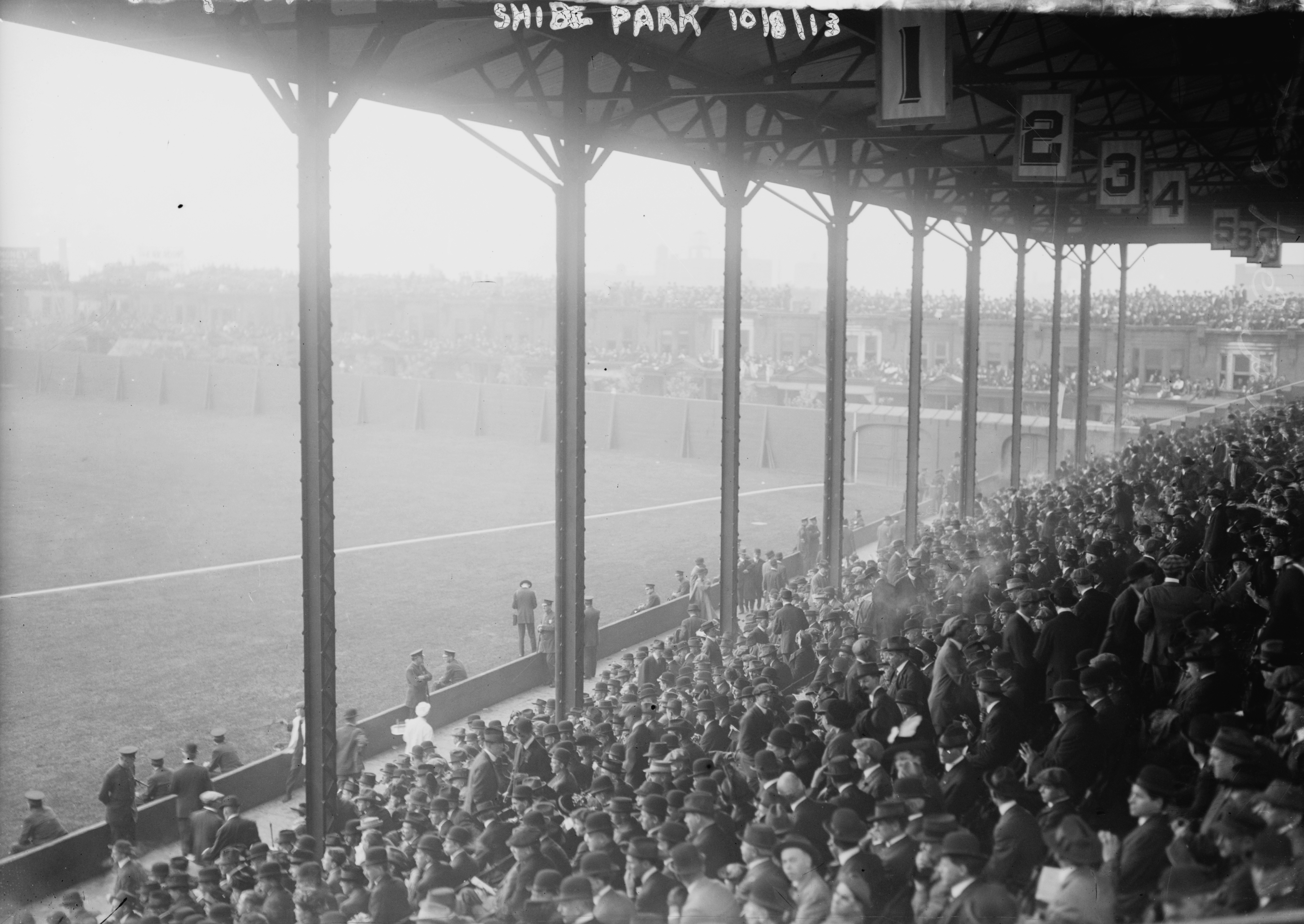
The stadium's third World Series in 1913 coincided with Shibe's first major upgrade and expansion: more seats, more roofs

In 1941, Mack installed a new, larger scoreboard in deep right-center field, replacing the small board that had been in the same general area, and about the same time an imposing sign went up on the left field fence with the message: "Warning: Persons throwing bottles or other missiles will be arrested and prosecuted." A few years later, he would add a tunnel between the visitors' clubhouse and their dugout to avoid confrontations with belligerent hometown fans.

After the war, the Macks wanted to expand the seating capacity again, in a park that was running out of room to expand into. In 1949, they proposed erecting the ultimate spite fence: a new double-deck seating section in right field that would boost the park's capacity to 50,000. The problem was that the home plate-to-right field axis was the shorter dimension of the Shibe block rectangle, and since the new stand could not intrude into the play area, its fascia would have to be in the plane of the existing right field fence while its hindquarters would have to protrude out back, dangling some 15 feet (4.6 m) above the west sidewalk of North 20th Street and forming a covered arcade walkway. The $2.5-million proposal galvanized the 20th Street neighbors against the A's again, and this time the legal team could not overcome the zoning issues.

The Macks did spend $300,000 on renovations in 1949 and managed to shoehorn 2,500 more box seats in; the old lower deck pavilion seating was reconstructed to turn the more distant seats toward the diamond instead of facing the outfield. This resulted in the high corners that were a noticeable feature of the ballpark during its final two decades, the corners being just far enough away from the foul lines to accommodate the bullpens. They also added an "annunciator" on the upper deck beyond third base that flashed the at-bat number; ball-strike-out count; hit or error; and score.

=== 1935: The "spite fence" ===
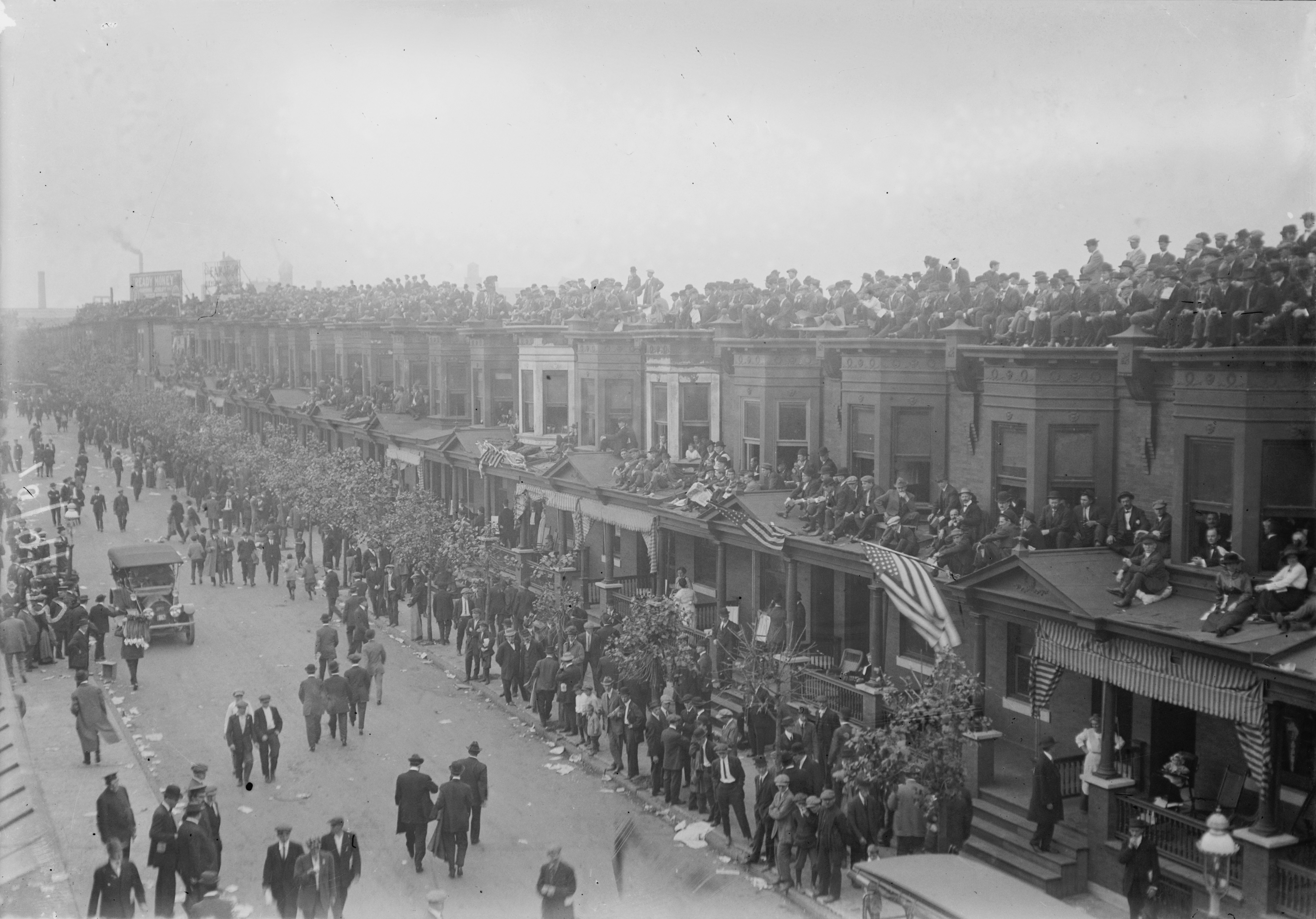

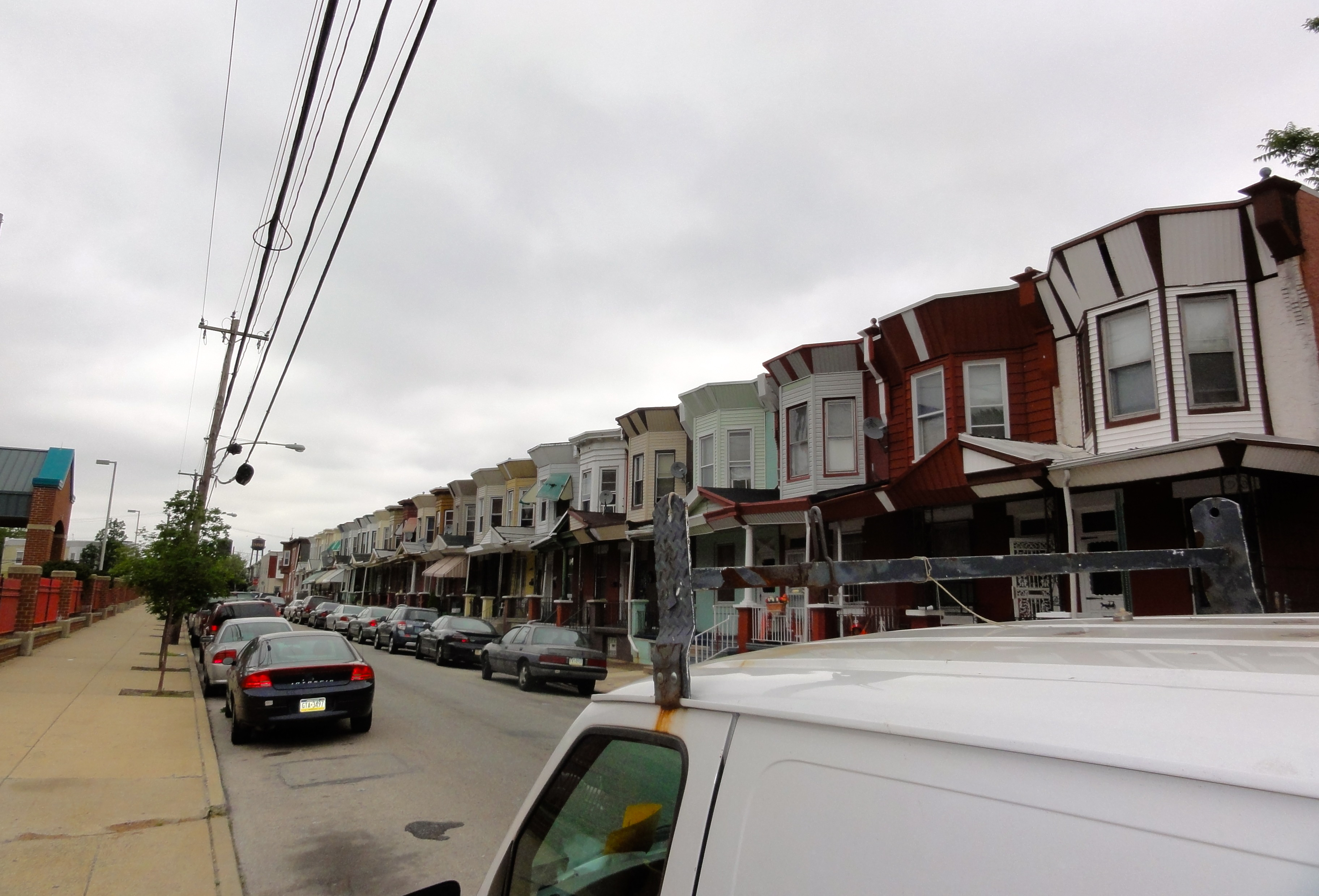
Across 20th Street from Shibe: above, in 1913 with rooftop bleachers; below, 2011

At the park's beginning, homeowners on both Somerset Street and 20th Street had a great view of the proceedings within, thanks to the low outfield fences. While this changed for the people on Somerset in 1913 when Shibe added the left field bleacher section and blocked the view from that direction. It was still a clear shot in from 20th Street over the low, 12-foot wall in right. The view from the roofs, the bedroom bay windows, and even the porch roofs on 20th was as good as from some of the seats inside the park. Pathé News, Universal Newsreel Fox Movietone News even set up cameras at 2739 North 20th as part of their World Series coverage.

The numbers involved in this cottage industry were considerable. A rooftop bleacher could hold up to 80 people, with 18 more in the bay window of the front bedroom and more even on the porch roof. Viewers on the block could number up to several thousand for important games. Housewives served up refreshments for sale and children scurried to the hot dog vendors on the street, bought dogs for a nickel, and brought them back to sell for a dime. With so much money on the line, the business got organized and formalized very quickly. Homeowners were soon squeezed for bribes by city amusement tax collectors, and city police collected commissions for collaring and herding fans from the sidewalk into particular homes. By 1929, the extra income from the rooftop bleachers actually caused real estate values to climb on the 2700 block of North 20th Street.

As long as the A's were winning games and filling the park, the 20th Street entrepreneurs were annoying, but little more, to Mack and the Shibes, but that changed in the early 1930s. Starting in 1932, Mack's sell-off of his Second Dynasty stars, combined with general Great Depression hard times, sent attendance plummeting. 20th Streeters, accustomed to the income but now suffering from the tough economy like everyone else, sent reps to the lines – such as they were – at the park box office to offer discount seats and poach customers from the ball club. This was the last straw for Jack Shibe. In the winter of 1934–35, he ordered the fence raised to 34 feet (10 m). While the higher fence was Jack Shibe's idea, it became generally known as "Connie Mack's Spite Fence." This was because Mack had been operating head of the franchise since Ben Shibe's death.

The fence not only limited the view from the street, but the unattractive corrugated metal structure curtailed much of the goodwill the team had had with its neighbors, goodwill that would never return. It also frustrated many Philadelphia players, both offensively and defensively. Among them, A's and Phillies outfielder Elmer Valo and Phillies right fielder Johnny Callison, both lefthanded batters, complained that the high right-field fence cost them many home runs.

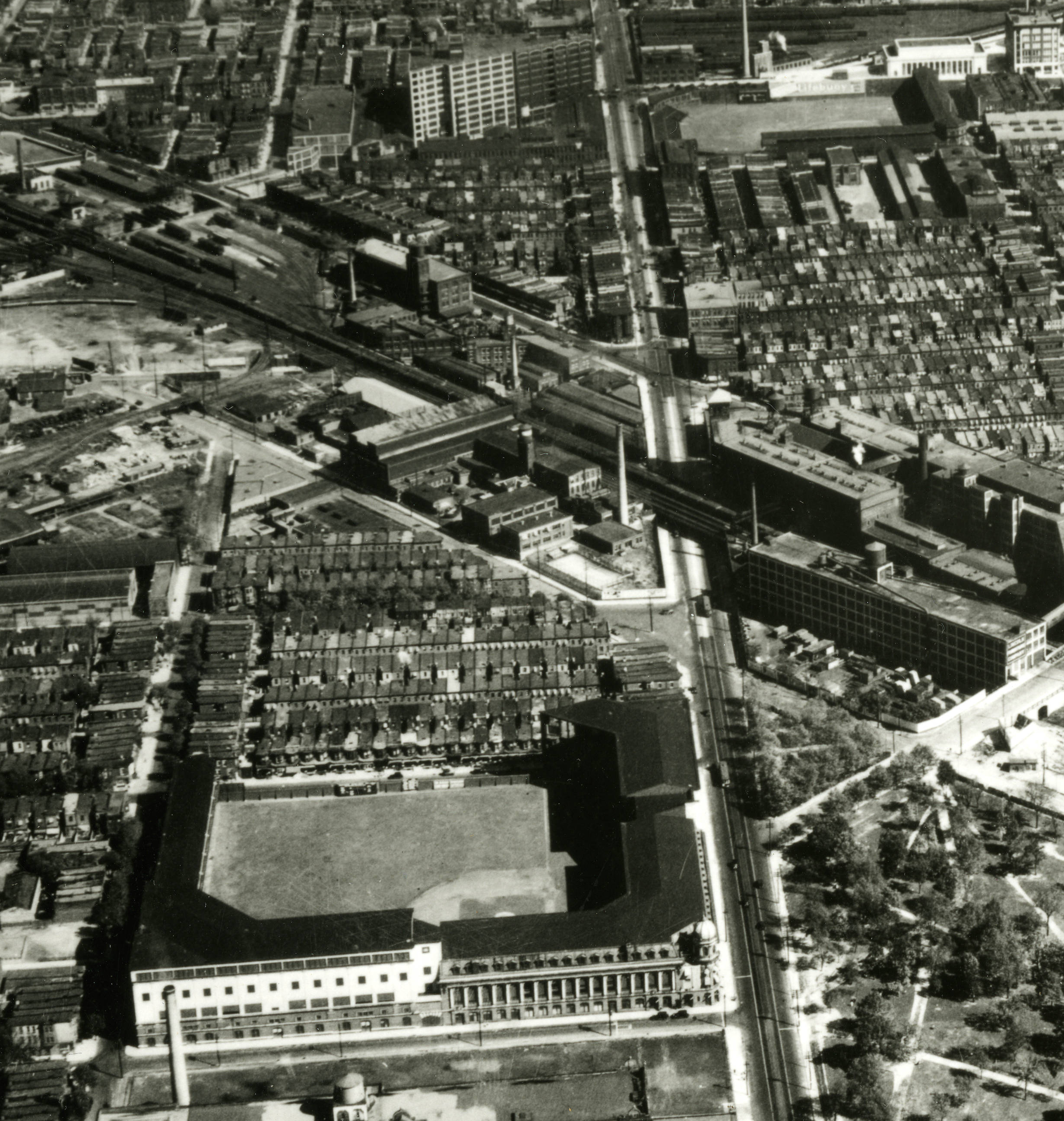
Just five blocks—but a whole generation—apart. Baker Bowl (upper right) was one of the last of the rickety wooden parks, while concrete-and-steel Shibe Park (foreground) set the bar for those to come. Looking east along Lehigh Avenue, 1929

It dogged them when they played the field, too: its rippling corrugations made caroms unpredictable, with some balls dropping straight down, others bounding all the way back to second base and some bouncing radically to one side or another, sometimes into the bullpen. It was "one of the hardest" walls to play in the majors.

=== 1938–1954: New tenant, new name, new owner ===
The Phillies had played at National League Park at 15th and Huntingdon Streets since 1887. The ballpark that would come to be known as Baker Bowl, had been a premier park in the 1890s but by the 1920s was considered small by dimensions and capacity in the post-1920 live ball era. The Phillies first began to consider a move to Shibe in the late 1920s and the Athletics constructed a dedicated clubhouse for the Phillies at Shibe at the left field end of the grandstand by third base. By 1938, the Phillies were paying $50,000 per-year in rent and taxes at National League Park. Shibe Park presented lower costs, and increased capacity from the 18,000 at the Phillies' park to the 32,000 seats at Shibe which could be increased by 5,000 with standing room. Trucks moved the Phillies property and equipment to Shibe Park on June 30, 1938 following the team's loss to the New York Giants. The Phillies relocated their offices to a space built for them in Shibe Park fronting Lehigh Avenue. Concessions were retained by the Athletics who agreed to pay the Phillies a percentage of sales during their games.

The Phillies' arranged with the Athletics and the Mack family that they would pay rent of ten cents a head for every fan that came through the gates, and would hire and pay their own stadium staff on game days. While moving to Shibe likely saved the Phillies from extinction, having two teams play in the park complicated scheduling. The extra income from the Phillies was offset by the crowded baseball schedule tying up the park for nearly all of the summer, so it affected the A's bottom line very little. The Phillies' first game at Shibe Park was a split doubleheader against Boston on July 4, and they finished the season last, 24½ games behind the seventh place Brooklyn Dodgers and 43 games back overall.

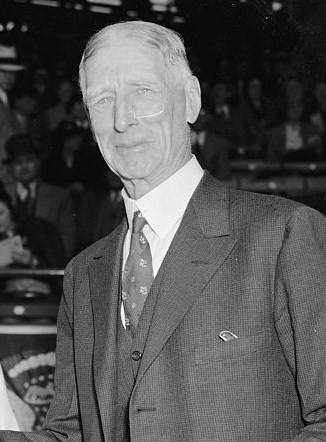
Mack was already 75 years old in 1938 when the Phils arrived, yet his tenure had twelve more years to go

21st and Lehigh was one of the gloomiest addresses in baseball in the late 1930s and early 1940s. At the time, both Philadelphia teams were in long stretches of futility. The Phillies had notched one winning season since 1918, while the A's had not had a winning season since 1933. Both teams finished last in their leagues in 1938, 1940, 1941, 1942 and 1945. Making things worse was that Phillies owner Gerald Nugent was mired in debt to both Mack and the National League, and other NL owners were grumbling about the dismal receipts their Philly trips earned them. In 1943 Nugent agreed in principle to sell the Phillies to Bill Veeck, only to have that sale derailed by Commissioner Kenesaw Mountain Landis's objections to Veeck's plans to stock the Phillies with Negro league stars. The league took over the franchise and sold it for $190,000 and a $50,000 note to lumber baron William Cox, who paid off Mack and put money down on future rent. The flamboyant Cox poured money into the team in an effort to turn it around, but he also abraded fans, his own players, fellow owners, and Landis. The uproar did not last long; when Cox was found to be betting on Phillies games, Landis banned him for life on Nov. 23, 1943.

The same day that Cox was banned from baseball by Landis—Nov. 23, 1943 — Bob Carpenter Sr., scion of the Delaware-based duPont family, bought the team with his son for an estimated $400,000. Carpenter Sr. gave the club presidency to his son, Bob, Jr. – a 28-year-old Delawarean whose mother was a DuPont and who was himself part-owner with Connie Mack of the Wilmington Blue Rocks minor league team. The genial young millionaire admitted at his first press conference that he was short on experience, adding, "But I'm not worried. I think we can all have a good time." Carpenter slowly pulled the team out of its "dime store" way of doing business and invested heavily in the farm system, and hired marketing consultants. He upgraded his staff with professional administrators who modernized operations, while spending time in Mr. Mack's plush tower office listening to The Grand Old Man of Baseball.

The Carpenters tried to polish the team's image and way of doing business. They wanted to shed the image of failure by changing the team's nickname. Before the 1944 season, the team held a fan contest soliciting a new team nickname. Management chose "Blue Jays," the fan submission of Elizabeth Crooks, who received a $100 war bond as compensation. Phillies management said that the Blue Jays name was as an official "additional nickname," meaning that the team had two official nicknames simultaneously, the Phillies and the Blue Jays. The new Blue Jays moniker was ultimately unpopular; it was officially dropped by the team in January 1950. However, an expansion team in Toronto picked it up for its inaugural 1977 season and would coincidentally go on to play the Phillies in the 1993 World Series.

The Blue Jays recorded the city's first million-fan season in 1946, and the 1950 "Whiz Kids" Phillies team brought the NL pennant to Philadelphia for the first time in 35 years.

1950: Watershed year for the A's and Phils
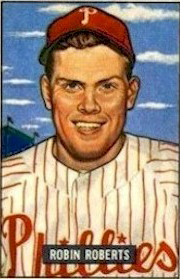
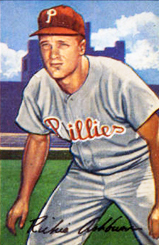
The 1950 Whiz Kids won the lone Phillies pennant at 21st and Lehigh, which coincided with Connie Mack's swansong season as Athletics' manager

As the Phillies improved baseball life in Philadelphia, there was a decline in the fortunes of the A's – in the team, in the owner, and in the ballpark. Mack had alienated many fans in 1915, and again in 1932, when he sold off his pennant-winning teams for cash. His clashes with his neighbors over the spite fence, the night games and the 20th Street overhang sparked ill will between the team and its fan base. The Phillies began to outdraw the A's, who were in a vicious circle of bad teams and empty seats.

There was also a precipitous decline in the boss himself. 1950 marked Mack's 50th year in Philadelphia and his 87th birthday, and for the better part of a decade it had been obvious he was going senile. He would spend most games asleep in the dugout, leaving game strategy in the hands of his coaches. When he was awake, he often made strange calls that the players and coaches usually disregarded. He would also call for players from decades earlier to pinch-hit; in the 1940s it was not uncommon for him to yell "Baker!" or "Foxx!" – sluggers he had sold off decades before. Most ominously, the crowds at Shibe Park were so small that AL teams could not cover their travel expenses, leading owners to complain that receipts at Shibe Park were too small to justify the trip. Despite this, the A's managed to tally three straight winning seasons from 1947 to 1949. This led to hopes that the A's would give "The Grand Old Man of Baseball" the perfect 50th anniversary present – a pennant. However, the 1950 season was a disaster. By May 26, they were 11–21, their season all but finished. On that date, Mack's sons Roy and Earle gently pushed their father into announcing that he would retire at the end of the season.

The power vacuum in the wake of "Mr. Baseball's" exit only worsened the problems, however. Roy and Earle Mack, "undistinguished men living in the shadow of their father," were from Mack's first marriage; their half-brother Connie, Jr.—20 years their junior—came from his second. As the family factions squared off to battle for control of the A's, Junior and his mother joined forces with remnants of the Shibe family, who still owned 40% of the stock, while Roy and Earle shelved their years of squabbles to present a united front against what they derisively called "the Shibe faction." To raise cash for the coming struggle, Roy and Earle made poor decisions. They re-mortgaged the ballpark at a time when cashflow was uncertain, and they leased park concessions to an outside food service corporation.

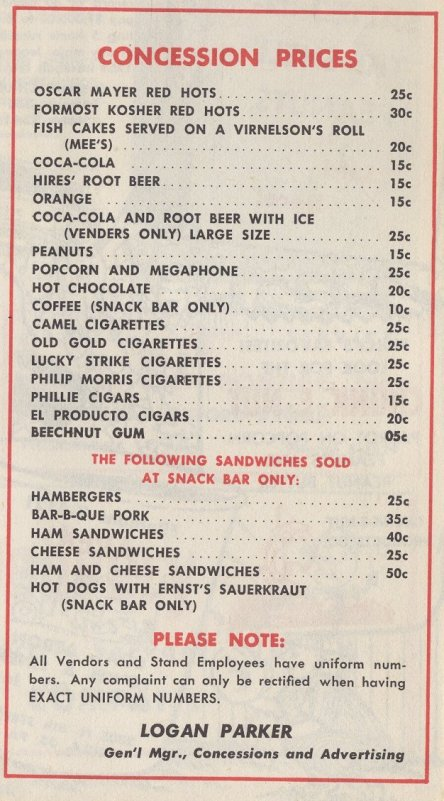
In 1954 at Shibe Park, a dollar ($10 in 2025) bought a hot dog, a soda, a pack of cigarettes, popcorn, and a megaphone, with a dime change

The brothers had simultaneously acquired huge debt and lost their best income sources. They managed to buy out Junior, the second Mrs. Mack and the remaining Shibes late in 1950. However, they then made one of the worst of several bad business decisions by mortgaging the team and pledging Shibe Park as collateral, saddling the A's with hefty mortgage payments that could have been spent on improving the team and the park. They immediately resumed battling each other, and much of the brothers' discord made the newspapers. In one famous episode, Earle separated from his wife and moved into a small suite he kept at the ballpark; when Roy heard about it, he had the water shut off in the place.

Despite undeniable deterioration, it would be a few more years before the operation collapsed entirely. In the meantime, the Macks tried to capitalize on the vestiges of affection in the city for their father, who turned 90 years old in December 1952. They opened a nostalgic Elephant Room, filled with memorabilia from the glory days, under the first base grandstand. They renamed the park Connie Mack Stadium in February 1953 for the opening of the 1953 season, hanging a new metal plate over the old SHIBE PARK inscription, which was "still written in stone" beneath. Many old-timers refused to acknowledge the change.

The Macks' bad business decisions finally caught up with them in 1954. While Roy had hoped to keep the team, Earle wanted out, and the meager attendance figures were hard to argue with. The A's business plan required attendance of 550,000 to break even, but in 1954 they drew just 305,000. A "Save The A's" committee formed to help, publishing daily the turnout needed to stay out of the red, but the turnstile count remained flat while the published number grew each day and the committee collapsed in the stretch run. Even Mayor Joe Clark hurt the effort: he admitted he was a Phillies fan. The A's finished 1954 last in the majors, sixty games out of first; their final game at Shibe drew only 1,715 fans.

In early August, Chicago businessman Arnold Johnson stepped forward with a complicated $3.375 million plan to buy the Athletics and move them to Kansas City. He owned Blues Stadium, home to the New York Yankees' top minor-league affiliate, but intended to sell it to the city for upgrading to major league standards. Roy, Earle and Connie Mack, Sr. would get about $1.5 million, Johnson would pay off the remaining mortgage, and he would assume the $400,000–$800,000 debt to the concessionaires. Very little of Johnson's own cash would be involved: the deal depended on real estate and the eagerness of Kansas City town fathers to take on debt for a major league franchise.

The problem with the deal was Connie Mack Stadium. The plan assumed a $1.5 million cash infusion from Bob Carpenter to buy the old ballpark, and he was unenthusiastic. "We need that ballpark as much as we need a hole in the head", he said. Its upkeep had deteriorated to the point that Carpenter estimated that modernizing the place would cost a million dollars, and even at that he believed it would be impossible to enlarge the seating capacity. He also recognized the growing parking problem, as well as the declining affluence of the neighborhood. He tried to pass on the purchase, reminding Johnson that he had a lease until 1957. Johnson responded by threatening to raise the "rent" to 20 cents a head, and to bill the Phillies for stadium upkeep the A's had always paid for. When Carpenter did not show signs of giving in, Johnson said he would call the entire deal off. Carpenter was now in a bind, since there was no other facility in the Delaware Valley that was suitable even for temporary use. Reluctantly, he bought the park for $1.7 million in December, and formed the 21st and Lehigh Realty Company to run it. Nominally, the Phillies were Carpenter's tenants, paying him rent just as they had paid rent to the A's previously. In practice, however, Carpenter was transferring money from one pocket to the other.

Showing its age despite a new name

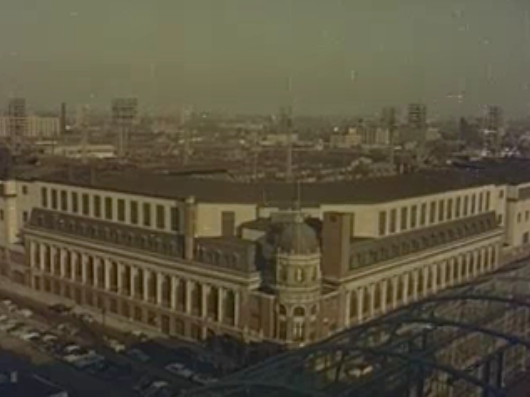
1955: ungainly top-deck roofs overwhelm original design, dwarfing the corner tower

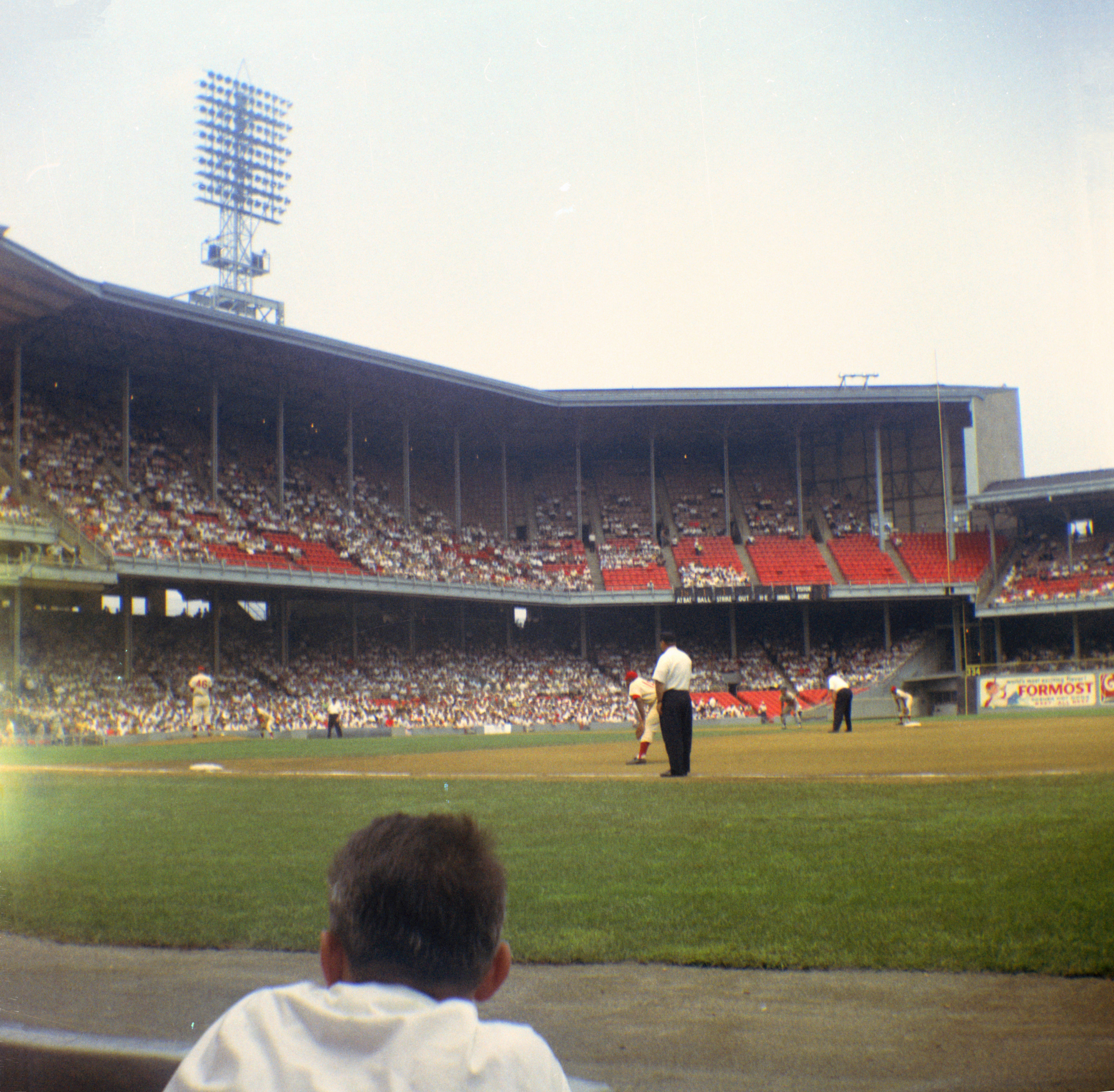
1960: Even the draw of a doubleheader with the Dodgers did not fill many seats upstairs

In early 1955, two trucks backed up to the stadium and packed the artifacts from the Elephant Room for removal to Kansas City. Carpenter encouraged Mr. Mack to continue using his opulent tower office in the stadium that now bore his name, which he did almost daily until his death some 13 months later.

=== 1955–1970: Carpenter, Phillies and decline ===
When the stadium opened for the 1955 season, Carpenter's first, advertising billboards first appeared on the walls and roofs of the outfield: Foremost dairy, Goldenberg's Peanut Chews, Philco, Cadillac, Alpo, Coca-Cola and Martz Tours signs became familiar sights to stadiumgoers and to fans watching on television. A new straight-across fence covered the square corner in center field and most of the remaining "terrace", reducing the distance to a still-formidable 447 feet (136 m). Distance markers also appeared on the walls for the first time. In addition to the foul poles (334 and 331) and the center field area (447), a 400 marker was posted just to the center field side of the scoreboard, and a 405 marker in the corresponding area of deep left center field. A few years later, wooden fencing covered the rough bricks along the right field wall, and eventually the 331 sign was changed to read 329, although that change had no impact on the actual home run distance.

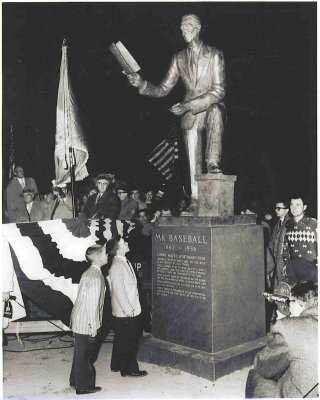
A statue of Connie Mack was erected in 1957 across the street; two of his great-grandsons pulled the ropes that unveiled the statue

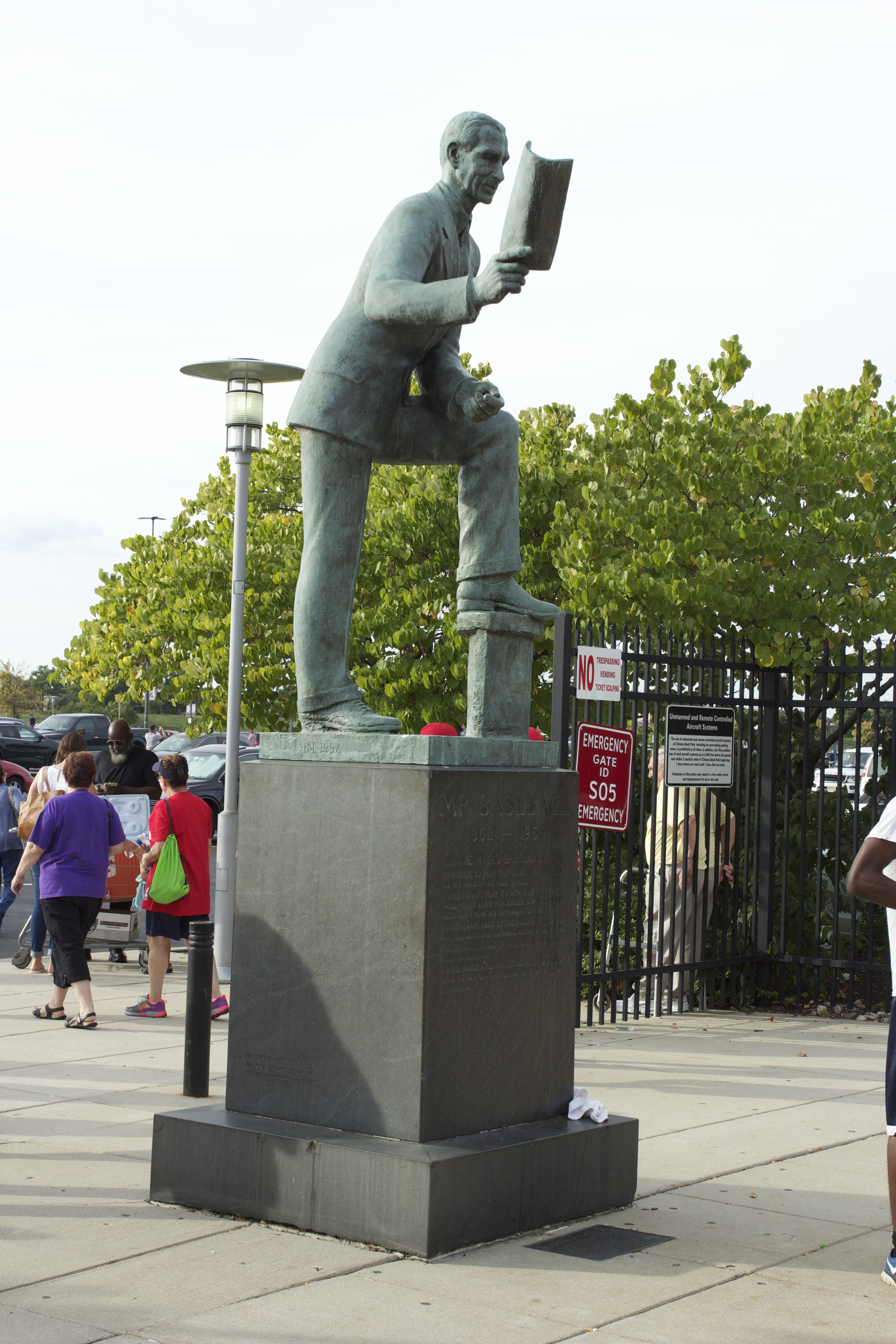
The Mack statue at its current location, adjacent to Citizens Bank Park in South Philadelphia

In 1956, Bob Carpenter replaced the old 1941 scoreboard in right-center field with a new, much larger board, constructed for Connie Mack Stadium. A prominent feature of the new board was the Ballantine Beer advertisement across the top and the Longines clock perched above it. The board's superficial resemblance to the similarly adorned board in Yankee Stadium gave rise to the urban legend that the board was acquired second-hand from the Yankees. However, the boards differed in many details, and the Yankee Stadium board remained until 1959 when it was replaced, a few years after Connie Mack Stadium's new board had made its appearance.

The big scoreboard extended well above the top of the right field fence, topping out at 75 feet (23 m) including the clock. The entire board was in play except for the clock that topped the board: Balls that hit the clock were home runs. Dick Allen was the only player to ever hit a home run over the Ballantine Beer sign and scoreboard. The scoreboard was used through the final year at the ballpark. Also in 1956, a new Plexiglas barrier replaced the old backstop screen, an experiment also conducted at Cincinnati's Crosley Field around that same time.

After the death of Mr. Mack in February 1956, a Mack Memorial Committee raised funds and commissioned sculptor Harry Rosin to create a statue of "Mr. Baseball". On April 16, 1957, it was unveiled across Lehigh Avenue in Reyburn Park – named after the mayor who threw out the first ball at Shibe back in 1909 – as part of the Opening Day ceremonies for the 1957 season. Commissioner Ford Frick, AL president Will Harridge and Leo Durocher all attended, as did many former A's players; the ceremony was emceed by sportscaster Bill Campbell. Shortly after, the Philadelphia City Council removed Reyburn's name from the park and replaced it with Mack's. The statue was later moved to Veterans Stadium in 1971, and ultimately to Citizens Bank Park in 2004.

For the 1960 season, additional box seats in front of the original grandstand reduced the plate-to-screen distance by about 10 feet (3.0 m). With a couple of years of life left in the park, a curving inner fence across center field reduced the distance from 447 to 410. The final seating capacity of the ballpark, as recorded in the 1970 Sporting News Baseball Guide, was 33,608.

Carpenter's reluctance about Connie Mack Stadium soon proved justified. He found it impossible to find a way to make the park profitable. His first thought was to extend the length of his income season by adding a football team. In 1959, he sought to buy an American Football League franchise, but the negotiations failed. Additionally, the neighborhood experienced white flight, leading to rising crime; the phrase "Watch your car, mister?" became a catch phrase to game attendees. Indeed, the parking problem became the very crux of the issue in the 1950s and 1960s, since the stadium was not well-suited for automobile traffic. It had opened in the year the Ford Model T was introduced, and was designed in an era where most people relied on public transportation to come to games. However, after the war, the automobile became the standard mode of transport. There was a 500-car lot, later expanded to 850 cars, across 21st Street, but it was not nearly enough. Carpenter tried to buy the whole block in 1959 for a multi-level garage, but the deal fell through. The team maintained special "Phillies Express" buses to shuttle fans from transportation hubs in Camden and 69th Street Terminal in Upper Darby Township, but the service never really caught on. Carpenter also investigated land tracts first in West Philadelphia, then in the Torresdale section of the city, as well as nearby suburban Cheltenham and farther-flung Camden, across the river in New Jersey. But there were prohibitive problems with every one of those proposed sites.

Carpenter finally gave up and in 1961 sold the stadium for $600,000 to a group of New York real estate investors, losing over a million dollars after his 7-year ownership; he secured a 3-year lease and an option to stay through 1967 while he pursued his Torresdale stadium plan. The New York buyers quickly flipped the property to another New York consortium who, assuming the Phillies would be gone by 1967, began planning the demolition of the stadium and construction of a bowling alley and discount store on the site. Then in May 1964, Jerry Wolman, who had just bought the Philadelphia Eagles in February, brought the stadium ownership back to town, paying $757,000 for it as part of a larger real estate deal. Wolman's motivations for the purchase are in dispute – all the mortgage shuffling did not slow the decay out at the park – but he claimed he wanted to help the Phillies; the move also put him at the very center of the emerging fight over a new stadium in Philadelphia, which would likely affect his Eagles.

Wolman, the city, and even Carpenter were all exploring plans to solve the town's stadium problem. The plan that came closest to fruition was a complicated 1964 package that called for a new stadium with parking for 7,000 cars to be built "on stilts" over the vast railroad yards near 30th Street Station. This plan had considerable backing from city politicians and businessmen, but it too eventually unraveled when federal urban renewal funds did not come through and extended wrangling between Wolman and everyone else involved brought it down. Wolman then tried to sell the park to the city for the nominal price of 50 cents, but Mayor James Tate balked at using city money to pay for major renovations. Eventually the city would build Veterans Stadium in South Philadelphia and the Phillies would leave Connie Mack Stadium.

1914 World Series: A's vs. Braves
The close of The First Dynasty

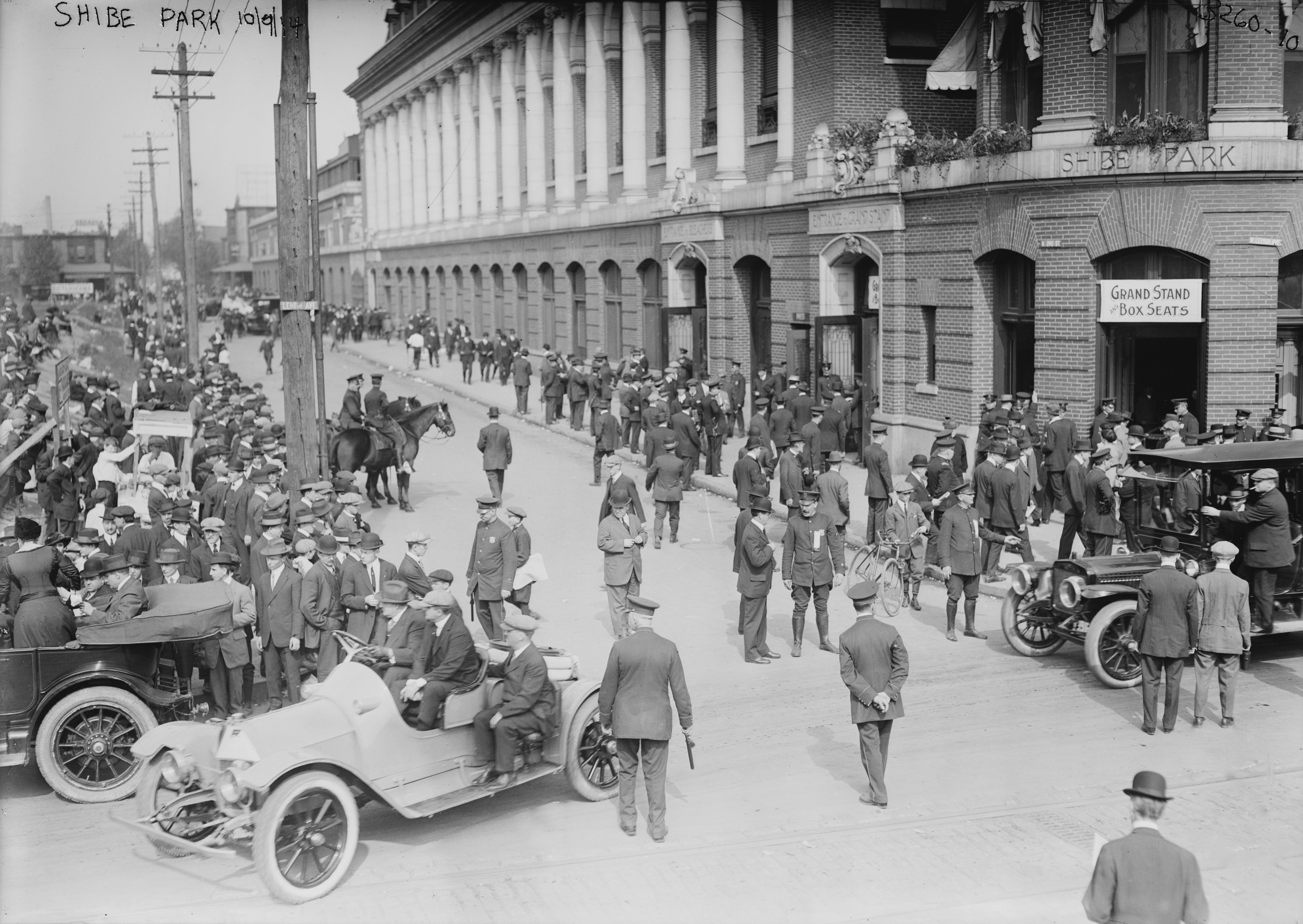
Outside, fans mill about the 21st and Lehigh box office in search of World Series tickets

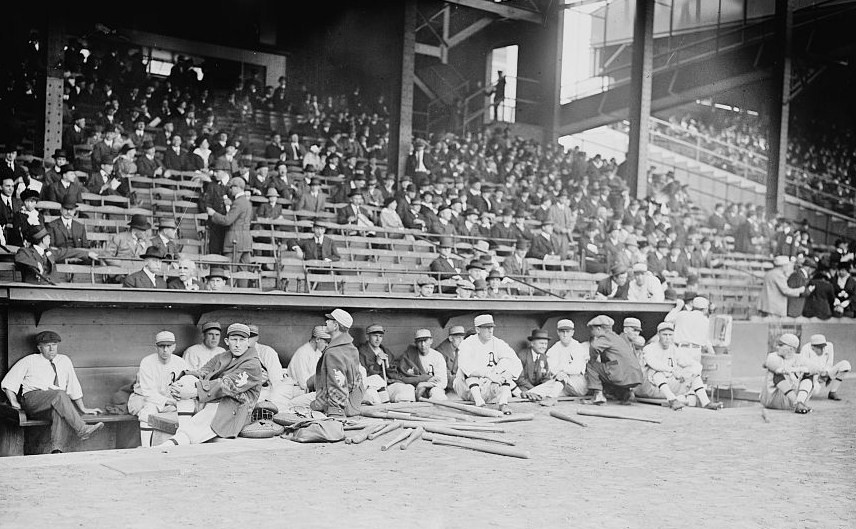
Inside, the A's await Game 1; they were swept by the "Miracle Braves" in four games

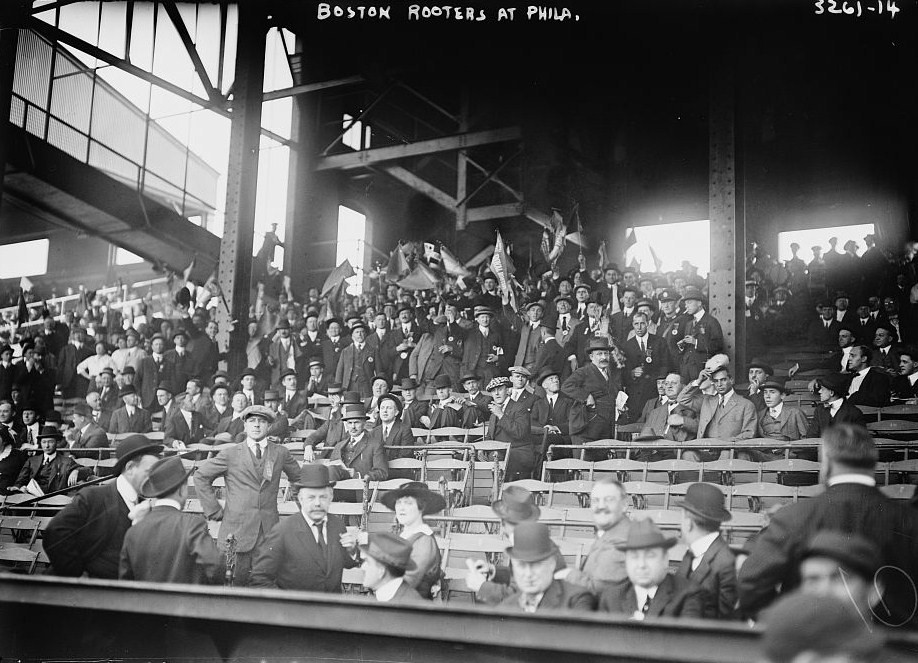
Up in the stands, the Boston "Royal Rooters" had arrived on a special train, had paraded up Broad St. and had dedicated seating

The final game at Connie Mack Stadium was played on October 1, 1970, with the Phillies defeating the Montreal Expos 2–1 in 10 innings. The occasion was marred by souvenir hunters literally dismantling the stadium even while the game was still in progress. A special post-game ceremony – including a helicopter removal of home plate and delivery of it at The Vet – was cancelled in the mayhem.

== Baseball at the park ==
Over its 62 seasons of operation, Shibe Park was home to some of the best teams of their eras – and to some of the worst: the A's and the Phillies won eight of their leagues' pennants, bringing eight World Series to 21st and Lehigh. The two clubs also finished dead last in their leagues a combined 30 times – 18 by the A's, 12 by the Phillies. In 1996, Sports Illustrated proclaimed on its cover: "The 1929 Philadelphia A's, not the '27 Yankees, may have been the greatest baseball club ever assembled."

Over their first six seasons in the park, the A's dominated the American League. They won four pennants those six years and were famed for their $100,000 Infield (equal to $3,182,566 today), said by statistician Bill James to be the greatest infield of all time. Baseball historians since have dubbed the 1910–1914 A's clubs "The First Dynasty"; it was "the sport's first championship dynasty ever." After the 1914 team lost the World Series in four games, Connie Mack sold off his top stars. If there was any doubt the dynasty had ended, A's teams finished last in the AL the next seven years in a row. The fire sale and subsequent cellar seasons earned Mack and the A's tremendous acrimony among Philadelphia fans.

Mack launched a rebuilding program in the mid-1920s, and his effort became "The Second Dynasty", which culminated in back-to-back-to-back AL pennants in 1929, 1930 and 1931. It was an ill-timed hegemony, though: the Wall Street Crash of 1929 triggered the Great Depression, and hard times caused baseball attendance to plummet, winners or no. By October 1932, the second great sell-off, of The Second Dynasty, was underway; by 1935, the stars were gone and the franchise had picked up $545,000 cash (equal to $12,798,240 today) for itself. The A's had won the last of their pennants (and would not go to the postseason again until 1971, when they were in Oakland), and goodwill with the fan base was in short supply indeed.

The highs and lows of the A's were matched by those of the Phillies – except for most of the highs. As mentioned above, their first decade at Shibe saw the end of one of the longest streaks of futility in major league history – only one winning season from 1918 to 1948. Their 1950 Whiz Kids team did win a pennant – the first for a Philadelphia team in 19 years. The 1964 Phillies came close to doing it again – until the infamous "Phold". On the other side of the spectrum, the 1961 team managed to set an enduring record, though: their 23-losses-in-a-row mark (from July 29–August 20) has yet to be bested.

=== Memorable games ===
In the very first game at Shibe Park, catcher Doc Powers of the Philadelphia Athletics is said by some to have suffered internal injuries after crashing into a wall to catch a foul pop-up. Powers died two weeks later.

The Athletics participated in seven World Series during their tenure at the stadium: 1910, 1911, 1913, 1914, 1929, 1930 and 1931, winning the Fall Classic in 1910, 1911, 1913, 1929, and 1930. The hometown fans got to witness the A's clinch world titles at Shibe Park in 1911, 1929 and 1930.

The Phillies participated in one World Series during their tenure at the stadium, in 1950. They were swept by the New York Yankees.

The 1943 All-Star Game was the first of two that would be held at Shibe Park. The 1943 game was hosted by the Athletics, and the 1952 game by the Phillies. The 1943 game was the second of three wartime All-Star Games that would be played at night. The American Leaguers won the game, 5–3.

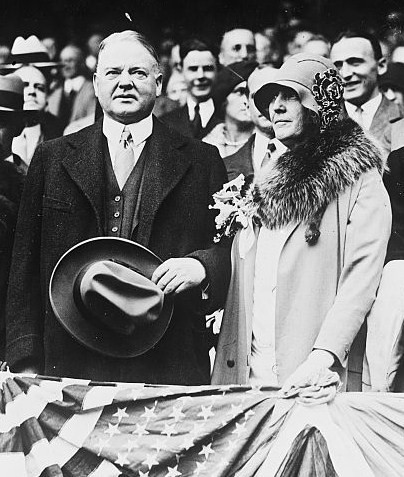
President and Mrs. Hoover at Shibe for the 1929 World Series, 18 days prior to Black Tuesday

The 1951 All-Star Game had originally been awarded to the Phillies. However, the city of Detroit was celebrating the 250th anniversary of its founding in 1701 and requested to host the year's All-Star Game. The 1951 game was moved to Briggs Stadium, and the Phillies then hosted the 1952 Game. The home city was well represented on the All-Star teams. Phillies pitcher Curt Simmons started the game for the Nationals in front of the home crowd; Phillies shortstop Granny Hamner started and batted eighth; and A's pitcher Bobby Shantz pitched the fifth inning for the Americans and struck out Whitey Lockman, Jackie Robinson and Stan Musial in succession. It had rained all day, starting early in the morning and keeping both teams from pre-game warm ups. Rain delayed the first pitch by 20 minutes and eventually caused the game to be called after the fifth inning. The National Leaguers emerged with a then-rare All-Star victory for the Senior Circuit, 3–2.

In September 1923, the A's had the misfortune of being no-hit twice in just four days, at home in Shibe Park. On the 4th, Yankees hurler Sam Jones was just one walk away from a perfect game when he no-hit the A's; four days later on the 7th, it was Boston's Howard Ehmke who was likewise a lone BB away from perfection.

In Game 4 of the 1929 World Series, the A's, down 8–0 to the Chicago Cubs, scored ten runs in the 7th inning to win. It was the highest score in a single inning and the biggest comeback in World Series history. The game on May 16, 1939, was the first night game played in the American League. The Cleveland Indians beat the A's 8–3 in front of 15,000+ nocturnal fans.

On September 28, 1941, the last day of the season, the Boston Red Sox played a doubleheader at Shibe Park. The day before, Boston manager Joe Cronin gave left fielder Ted Williams the option of sitting out the final two games, because his .3995 average would round up to .400. Williams walked the streets of Philadelphia that night, pondering; he decided the stat would be cheapened if he did sit out, so he played and went 6-for-8. His .406 average for 1941 was the last .400-plus average in the major leagues.

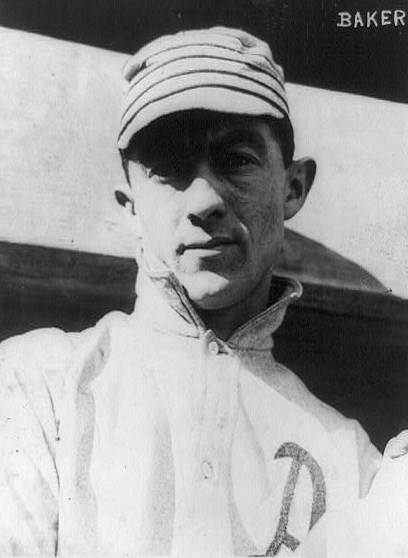
Frank "Home Run" Baker hit the first home run at Shibe Park, on May 29, 1909

Over the years, four A's pitchers tossed no-hitters in Shibe Park: Chief Bender in 1910, Bullet Joe Bush in 1916, Dick Fowler in 1945 and Bill McCahan in 1947.

=== Home runs ===
The ballpark was the site of some notable home run feats. On May 29, 1909, Frank "Home Run" Baker used his 52-ounce (3.3 lb) bat to hit the first home run in Shibe Park: 340 feet (100 m) over the right field fence, off Boston's RHP Frank Arellanes, who had previously served him up a grand slam pitch in Boston on April 24. Montreal Expos catcher John Bateman hit the last home run there on September 29, 1970, in the third from last game played at the stadium.

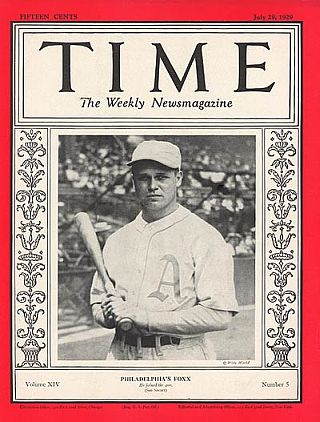
"Double-X's" prowess with the stick was national news the summer of 1929

Babe Ruth, who got his first hit as a Yankee at Shibe Park on April 14, 1920, hit a home run to deep left-center on September 9, 1921, that cleared the then-single bleacher stand, went across the street, and hit a tree over 500 feet (150 m) away. On May 21, 1930, Ruth hit one to right field over the 12-foot (3.7 m) wall that landed in Opal Street, the alley behind the second row of houses, again over 500 feet (150 m) distant and said to be the longest ever home run hit at Shibe Park. The longest strike ever hit there is said to be Ted Williams's ball blast that cleared the high roof at the right field line, passed over 20th, over Opal, over Garnet, and came down on 19th Street.

On June 3, 1932, Lou Gehrig hit four homers in one game. He hit two to the left field bleachers, two over the right field wall, and had a shot at a fifth homer with a deep fly to center, but center fielder Al Simmons snared it on a running catch. A's slugger Jimmie Foxx was also known for tape-measure blasts, especially during 1932 when he hit 58 home runs and challenged Ruth's season record of 60. Foxx was the all-time home run hitter at Shibe Park, with 195 round-trippers between 1927 and 1945.

On May 24, 1936, New York Yankees second baseman Tony Lazzeri hit two grand slams – one in the second off George Turbeville, one in the fifth off Herman Fink – and a solo shot in the seventh off Woody Upchurch, setting a single game RBI record of 11 (he also hit a 2-RBI triple). The Yanks prevailed, 25–2. Yankee sluggers set the record for home runs hit in a doubleheader when they visited Shibe Park on June 28, 1939. Tommy Henrich, Bill Dickey, George Selkirk and Frankie Crosetti hit one each and Joe Gordon, Babe Dahlgren and Joe DiMaggio all hit three. Total: 13 round-trippers. The Yanks won both ends, 23–2 and 10–0.

On June 2, 1949, the Phillies hit five home runs in the 8th inning: Del Ennis, Willie Jones and Schoolboy Rowe each smacked one and Andy Seminick hit two off Cincinnati Reds pitchers Ken Raffensberger, Jess Dobernic and Kent Peterson in a 12–3 win.

In later years, Dick Allen hit some booming drives over the roof of the double-decked bleachers, in the general direction of the 1921 Ruthian shot. He also cleared the big scoreboard in right-center field. Despite his hitting prowess, Allen was unpopular with the fans, and fellow long-ball hitter Willie Stargell of the Pittsburgh Pirates joked that the reason Allen was booed at home was that he hit his long drives clear out of the stadium: "When he hits a homer, there's no souvenir."

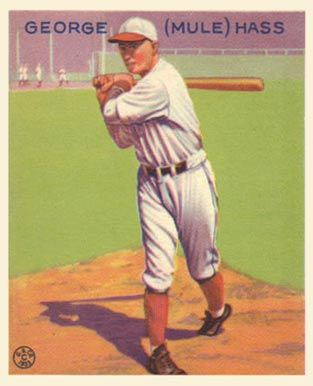
Mule Haas's inside-the-park homer helped the A's win the 1929 World Series

The single most famous home run hit at Shibe Park may be the one that stayed inside the park, in Game 4 of the 1929 World Series vs. the Chicago Cubs. Mule Haas of the A's hit a deep fly to center field which Hack Wilson of the Cubs lost in the sun. It landed behind him and rolled toward the center field corner, nearly 470 feet (140 m) from home plate. As Wilson tried to chase down the ball, Haas circled the bases. The A's scored a total of 10 runs in that inning, and went on to defeat the Cubs in the Series.

=== Negro league baseball ===
Shibe Park hosted its first Negro league games in 1919 when the Hilldale Club and Bacharach Giants played home games at the ballpark. Games between white major league teams and Negro league teams were not uncommon. The Bacharach Giants hosted an exhibition game at Shibe Park against John McGraw's New York Giants on October 6, 1919.

Shibe Park was a neutral site for Negro World Series games. The Cleveland Buckeyes defeated the Homestead Grays, 5–0, on September 20, 1945, to win game four and sweep the Series, four games to zero. Cleveland's Frank Carswell defeated Homestead's Ray Brown.

The Negro League Philadelphia Stars played home games at Shibe Park in the 1940s. The team's usual home field, at 44th and Parkside seated approximately 6,000 fans; the Stars were able to draw between 10,000 and 12,000 to Shibe Park. They often played double-headers on Monday nights, which was a travel day for the major league clubs.

For football, special stands in right field (at left here) brought fans close to action. Eagles won the 1948 NFL title in the snow at Shibe Park

Former Stars player Gene Benson would later recall the team playing about twenty games per season at Shibe Park. The Stars would dress in the A's locker room. The Stars drew their largest crowd on June 21, 1943, when 24,165 fans witnessed them defeating Satchel Paige and the Kansas City Monarchs.

== Professional football ==
Shibe Park hosted the Frankford Yellow Jackets against the Chicago Bears on December 5, 1925, and the Yellow Jackets against the Bears on December 4, 1926. It also served as the site of two AFL games in 1926, the Philadelphia Quakers against the Los Angeles Wildcats on November 20, 1926, and the Quakers against the New York Yankees on November 27, 1926. The stadium hosted the December 12, 1925, Pottsville Maroons–Notre Dame All-Stars game. The Maroons' NFL franchise was suspended as a result of the team's participation in that contest, costing Pottsville the 1925 NFL championship.

The National Football League's Philadelphia Eagles moved to Shibe Park in 1940 and played their home games at the stadium through 1957.

To accommodate football at Shibe Park during the winter, management set up stands in right field, parallel to Twentieth Street. Some twenty feet high, these "east stands" had twenty-two rows of seats. The goalposts stood along the first base line and in left field. The uncovered east stands enlarged capacity of Shibe Park to over thirty-nine thousand, but the Eagles rarely drew more than twenty-five to thirty thousand.

The Eagles played the 1948 NFL Championship Game in a blizzard; the home team defeated the Chicago Cardinals 7–0, the only score being a Steve Van Buren touchdown. The Eagles left Connie Mack Stadium after the 1957 season for Franklin Field. Franklin Field would seat over 60,000 for the Eagles whereas Connie Mack had a capacity of 39,000.

Presidential visit to Shibe Park, 1944
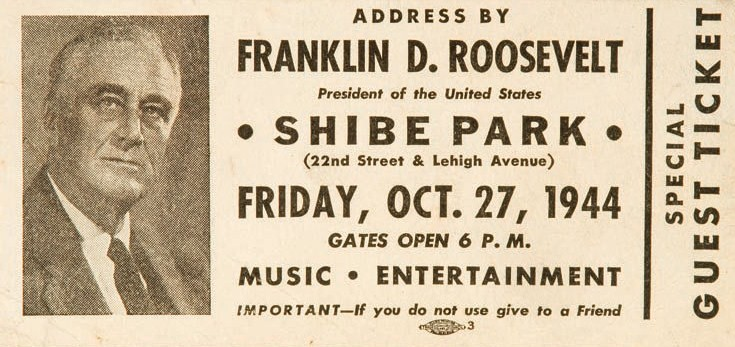

FDR addresses the crowd from his open car, elevated by special ramps on the field

== Boxing, politics, soccer, religion ==
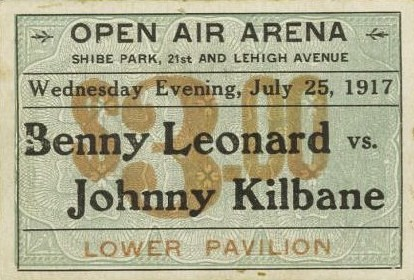
Shibe Park hosted a championship bout when Leonard beat challenger Kilbane, 1917

Shibe scion Jack briefly tried his hand as a boxing promoter in the early 1910s, shortly after his father built Shibe Park, and although he did not pursue the career, he did make the acquaintance of other promoters in the Philadelphia boxing world, including Bob Gunnis and Herman "Muggsy" Taylor. Gunnis and Taylor became among the first promoters to book a bout into a major league baseball stadium when they brought Johnny Dundee vs. George Chaney to Shibe Park in July 1917, and although the fight itself was unremarkable, the concept propelled Gunnis and Taylor to the forefront of their trade. Over the next forty years, perhaps a hundred boxing cards took place at Shibe, some of them big-time pairings and even championship bouts. Benny Leonard retained his championship against challenger Johnny Kilbane in 1917, and 1928's Benny Bass vs. Harry Blitman was said by sportswriters to be the best featherweight bout in the city's history. In the 1950s, Gil Turner, Ike Williams, Charley Fusari and many other top fighters fought important bouts at Shibe Park. At first, groundskeepers set the ring up over the pitcher's mound, but soon this changed to the area over home plate with the baseball backstops dismantled; spectators sat in the main grandstand for the fight. Even before the installation of the light towers in 1939, staging night boxing was easy because of the vastly smaller area that needed to be lit –portable searchlights did the trick.

In October 1948, the US national soccer team played three international friendlies against the Israel national team. The first game was played at the Polo Grounds and the last at Ebbets Field. In the middle match on October 17, the US beat Israel at Shibe Park, shutting them out 4–0 before 30,000 fans.

The events were not always sports-related: the 30-some-thousand seats were a good venue for political rallies. In 1940, Republican presidential candidate Wendell Willkie came to Shibe for a speech and rally. Four years later, the man who beat Willkie, Franklin D. Roosevelt, made one of his few 1944 public appearances at 21st and Lehigh; he won again. In 1948, third-party Progressive nominee Henry A. Wallace delivered his nomination acceptance speech at the stadium.

Promoters tried jazz concerts in 1959, but the place was deemed "not intimate enough" for jazz. The rodeo came in 1962, but hooves proved too destructive of the turf. The Ringling Brothers circus set up shop at Shibe in 1955 when they were denied occupancy at all their regular Philadelphia venues, and evangelist Billy Graham had many successful crusades there. The stadium management's favorite visitors were the Jehovah's Witnesses, "because the Witnesses left the park immaculate."

== Through the turnstiles ==
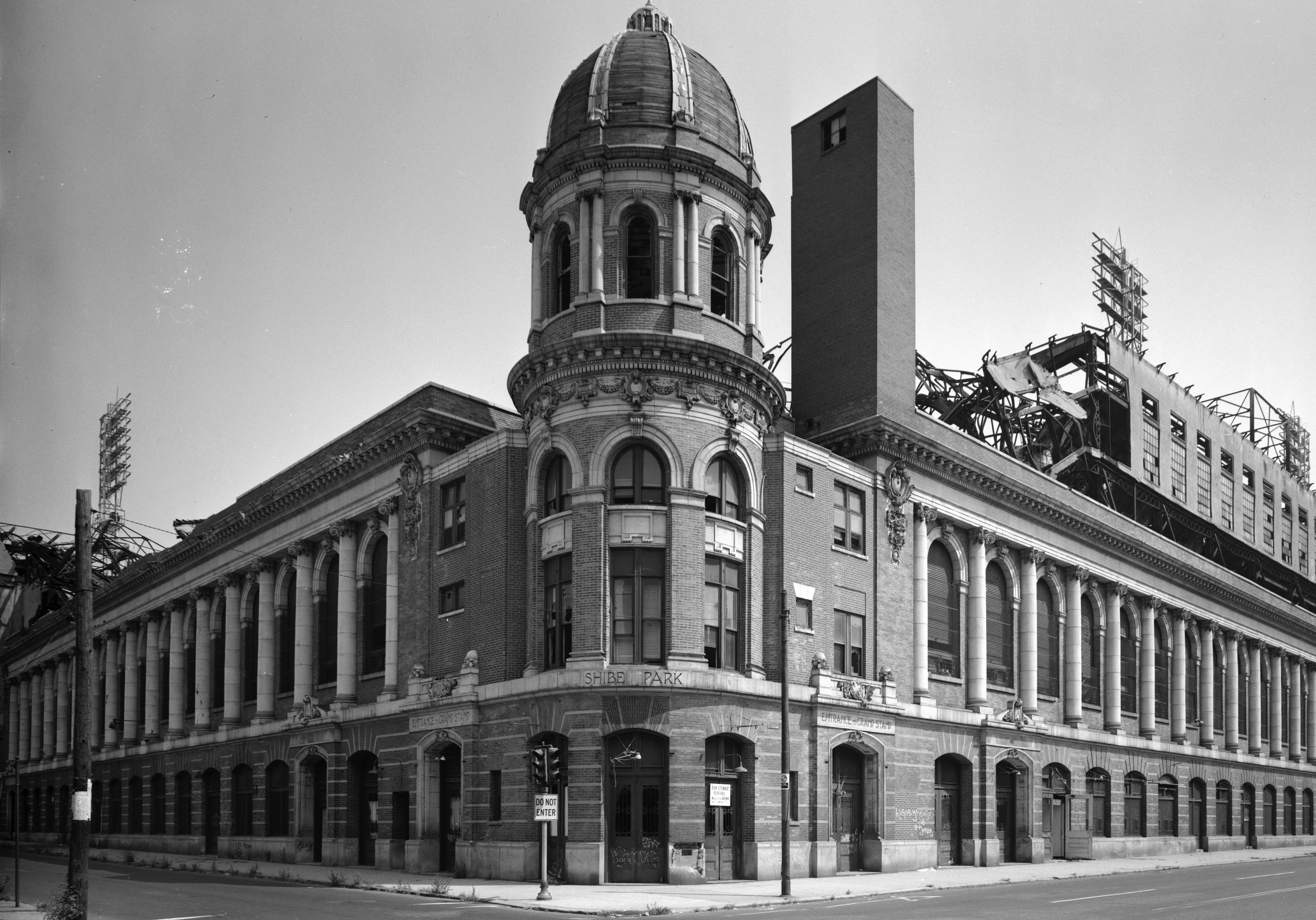
The signature corner tower in 1973. The damage from the 1971 fire can be seen. By then, the CONNIE MACK STADIUM metal plate had been removed, revealing the old SHIBE PARK name. The damaged area below it is where the cornerstone was located before being removed and sent to the National Baseball Hall of Fame and Museum where it sits today.

The Shibe Park turnstiles registered some 47 million clicks over 62 seasons of baseball. The Phillies were first to break the million mark for a season in 1946 with a team that was a "harbinger of the Whiz Kids." The star-crossed 1964 Phillies drew the highest single-season attendance with 1,425,891 in that infamous year; the Athletics' best-attended season was 1948, when they drew 945,076 fans.

The largest single-day baseball crowd came on May 11, 1947, when Jackie Robinson made his Philadelphia debut; the Phillies beat the Brooklyn Dodgers in both ends of their doubleheader that day as 41,660 looked on. The Athletics' best single-day turnout was also for a doubleheader, with the Washington Senators, on August 3, 1931, as the Second Dynasty team was closing in on its third AL pennant in a row; they swept both games before a crowd of 38,800-plus.

Low-ebb seasons were the Phillies' 1940 turnout of 207,177 and the Athletics' turnout of 146,223 in 1915, the year after Connie Mack sold off the stars from his 1914 pennant-winning team.

== Last years ==
The signature corner tower was the last to go: final day of demolition, July 13, 1976

In March 1971, bankrupt Jerry Wolman – who had to sell the Eagles in 1969 – agreed in principle to sell the Connie Mack Stadium property to Louis Graboyes and S. Solis Tollin. Without any permanent tenants for the stadium, Wolman had found himself unable to meet mortgage payments on it. The sale to Graboyes and Tollin, however, was never closed.

On August 20, 1971, the Connie Mack statue was re-dedicated at Veterans Stadium. That same day, while an evangelical revival group was setting up its tent, two stepbrothers, aged 9 and 12, sneaked into the park and started a small fire that grew into a 5-alarmer, burning through much of the original upper deck, collapsing the roof and leaving twisted steel supports visible from the streets. The park remained that way for four years, slowly deteriorating and becoming increasingly hazardous. Squatters took up revolving residence, and trash and debris accumulated. Small trees took root and flourished, while the once-manicured emerald turf became unruly knee-high stalks. In October 1975, Philadelphia Common Pleas Court Judge Ned Hirsh ordered what remained of the stadium razed. The corner tower and its domed cupola, Connie Mack's original office, was the last segment of the ballpark demolished, on July 13, 1976—the same day as the 47th MLB All-Star Game, played at Veterans Stadium.

Although Wolman was in default on the mortgage and there were many liens against the property – the most recent being the $100,000+ demolition tab from Geppert Brothers – he continued to own it until 1981, when he sold it to Deliverance Evangelistic Church, a nondenominational evangelical Christian congregation. In 1991, the church began constructing a 5,100-seat sanctuary on the site, which was completed a year later, and formally dedicated on August 30, 1992.

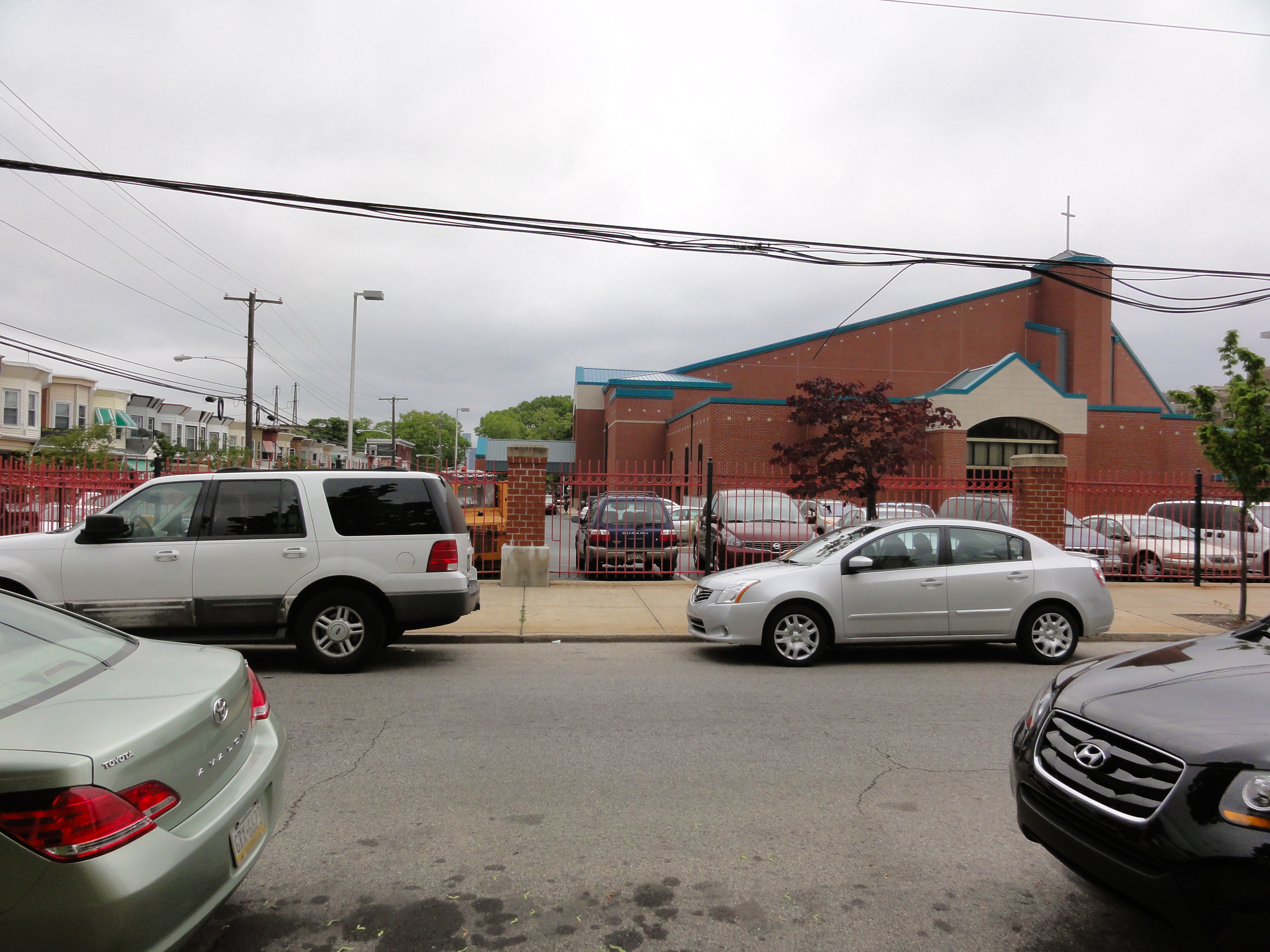
Shibe Park site 2011

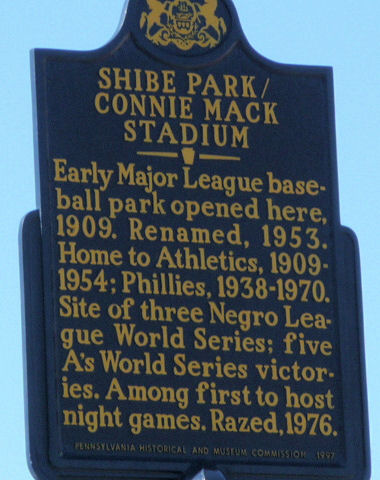
Shibe Park/Connie Mack Stadium historical marker 2014

== Contemporary culture ==
Shibe Park's rooftop bleachers became one of the inspirations for a special seating area in Citizens Bank Park when it opened in 2004. Of their "Rooftop Bleacher Seats", the Phillies announced, "The Phillies are bringing back rooftop bleacher seats, a Shibe Park phenomenon of the 1920s when residents of 20th Street built bleacher seats on top of their roofs. The seats are located on top of the buildings along Ashburn Alley."

Shibe Park was one of 10 historic ballparks celebrated on the USPS 34-cent Commemorative issue stamps, "Baseball's Legendary Playing Fields", released June 27, 2001. The reverse of the Shibe Park stamp reads, "The first Major League Baseball concrete-and-steel stadium, Philadelphia's Shibe Park featured a 34-foot (10 m)-high right field wall, as well as a façade with stately columns and a French Renaissance cupola." In 2009, the Philadelphia Brewing Co. released an ale named "Fleur de Lehigh", which features Shibe Park on the label.

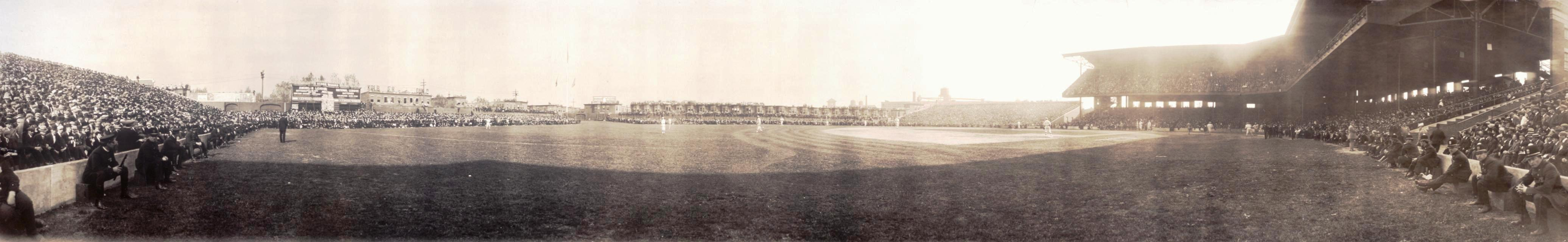
1910 World Series: Philadelphia A's vs. Chicago Cubs, Game 2 at Shibe Park. The home team prevailed, 9–3.

== Gallery: vacancy, 1973 ==
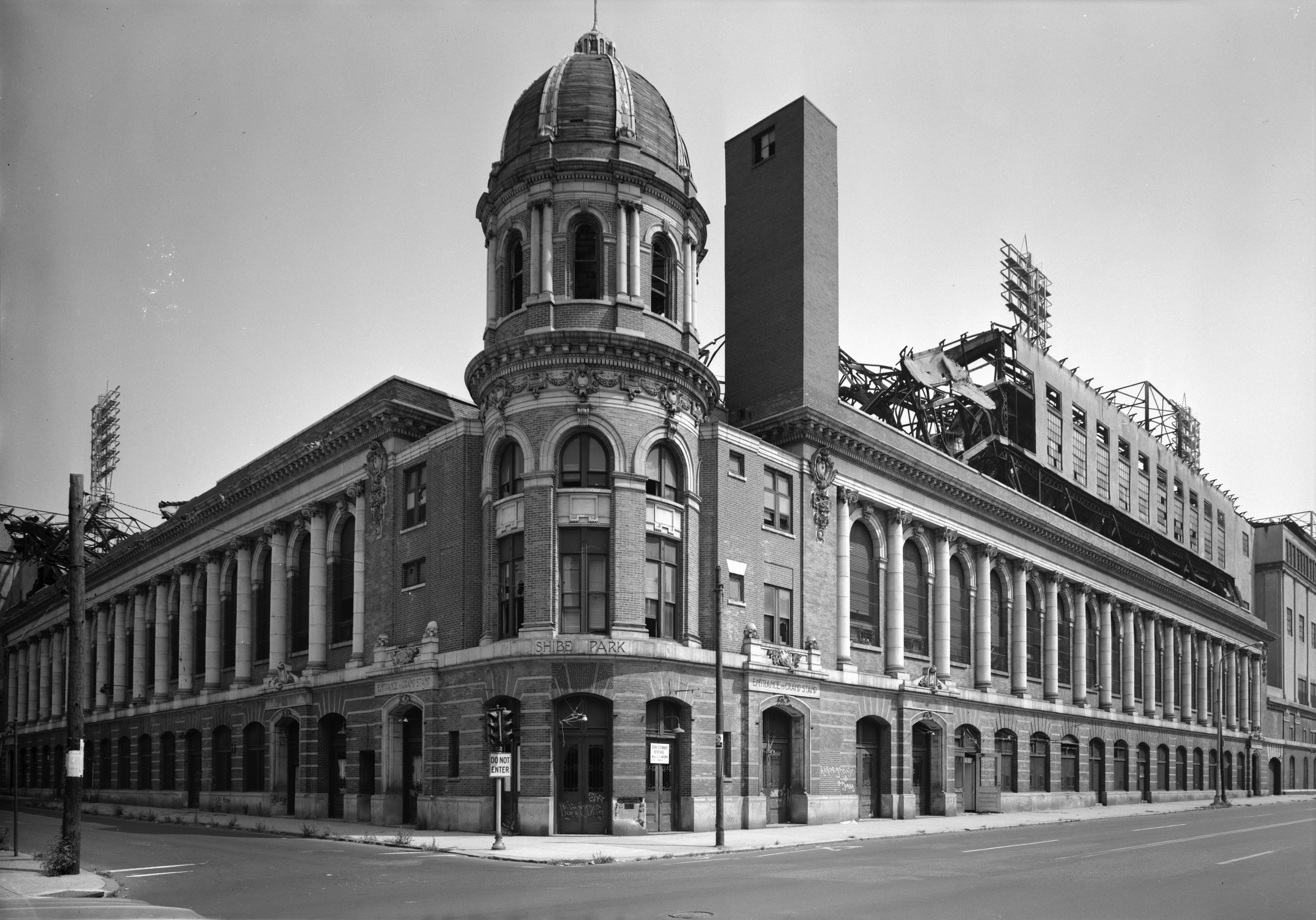
NE corner of 21st and Lehigh

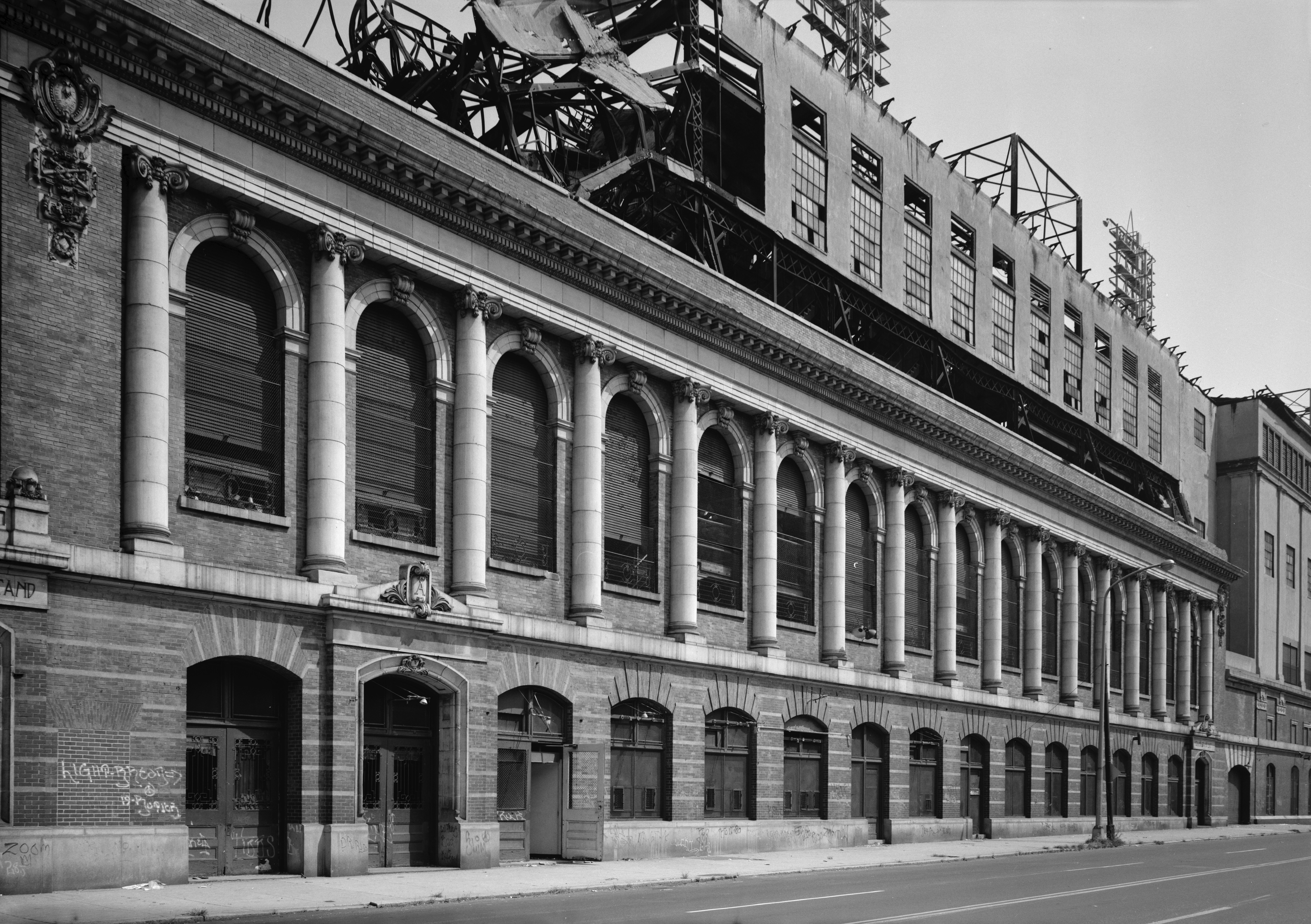
East grandstand, Lehigh Avenue

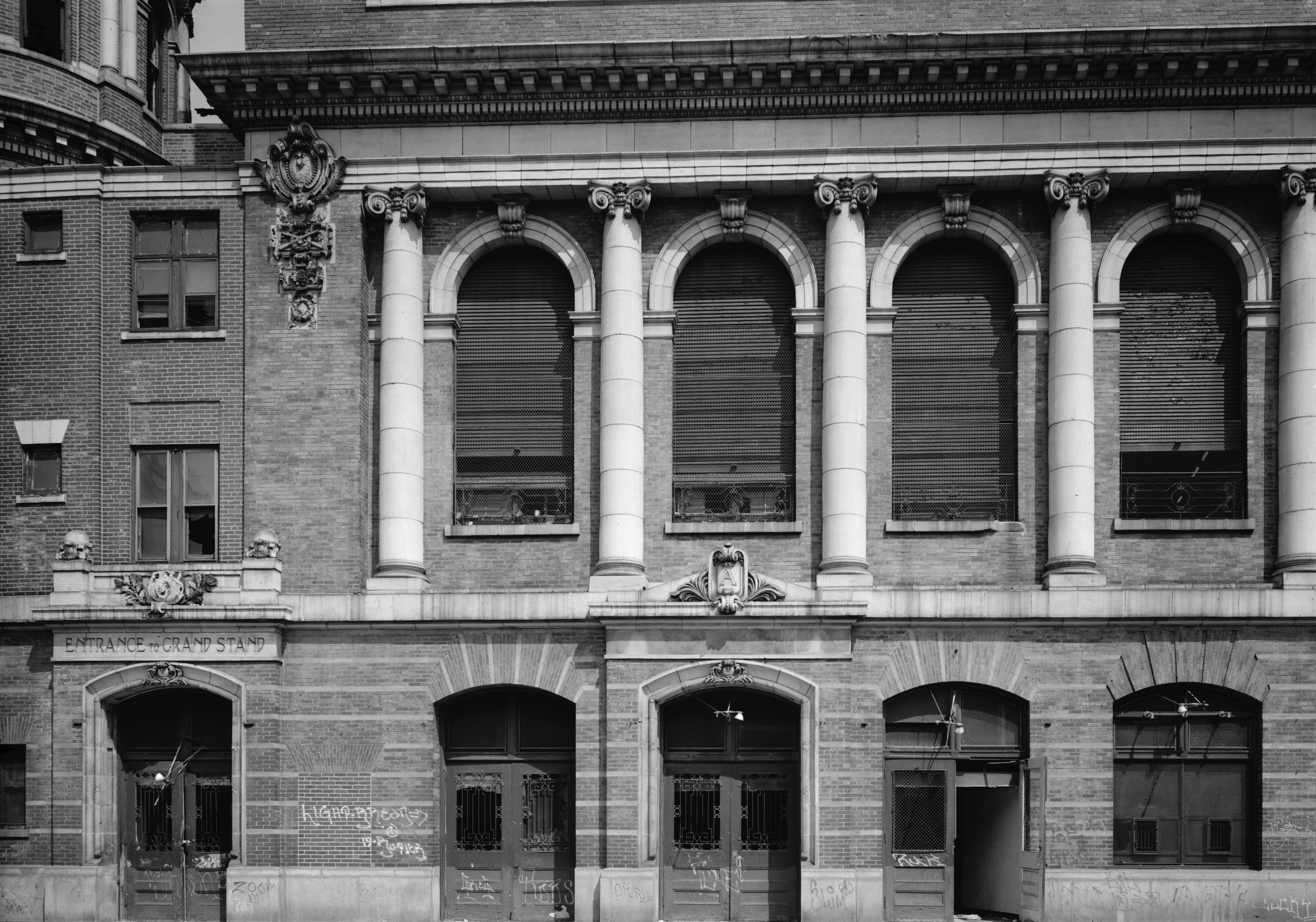
East grandstand, showing detail

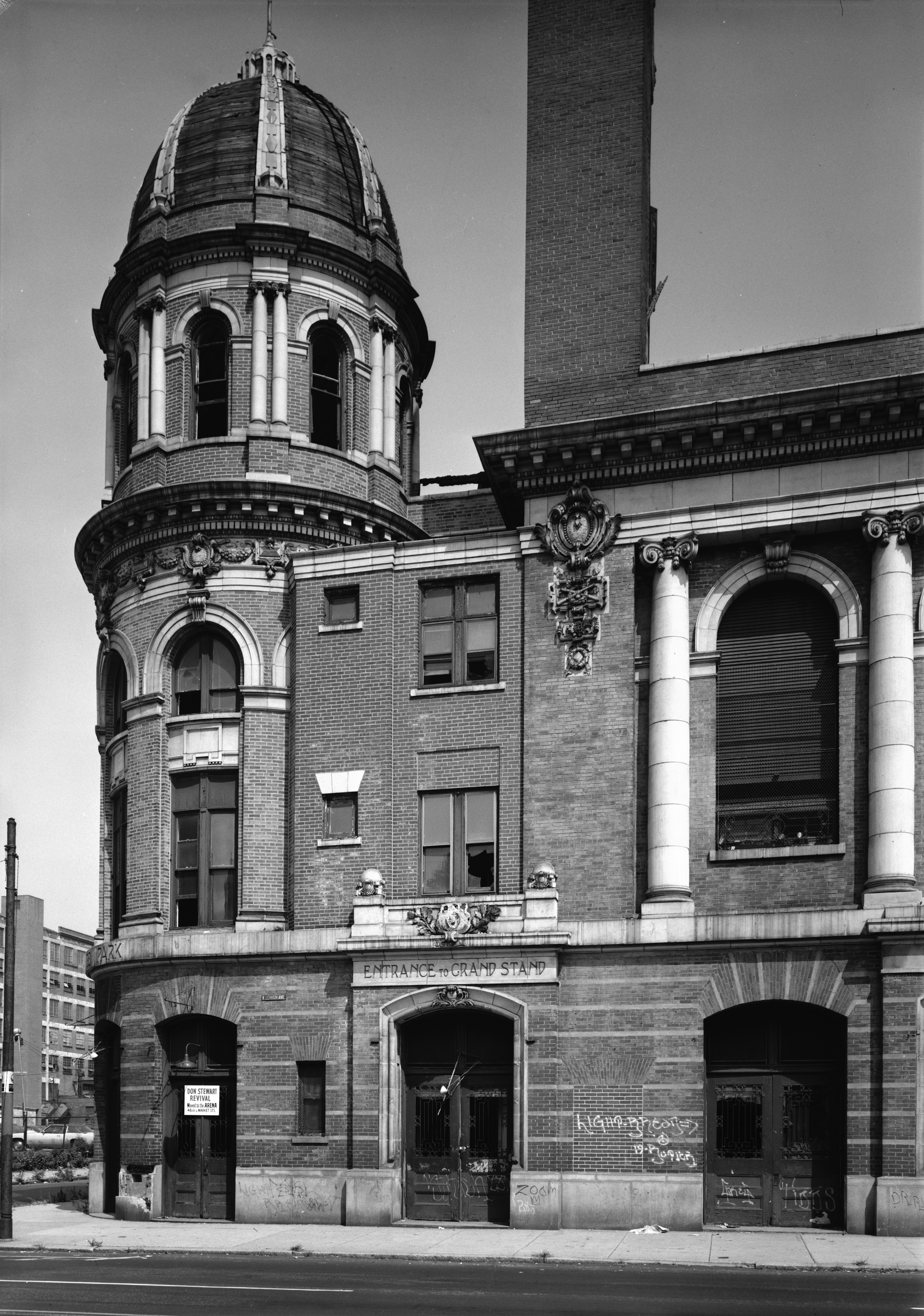
Detail, corner tower, grandstand

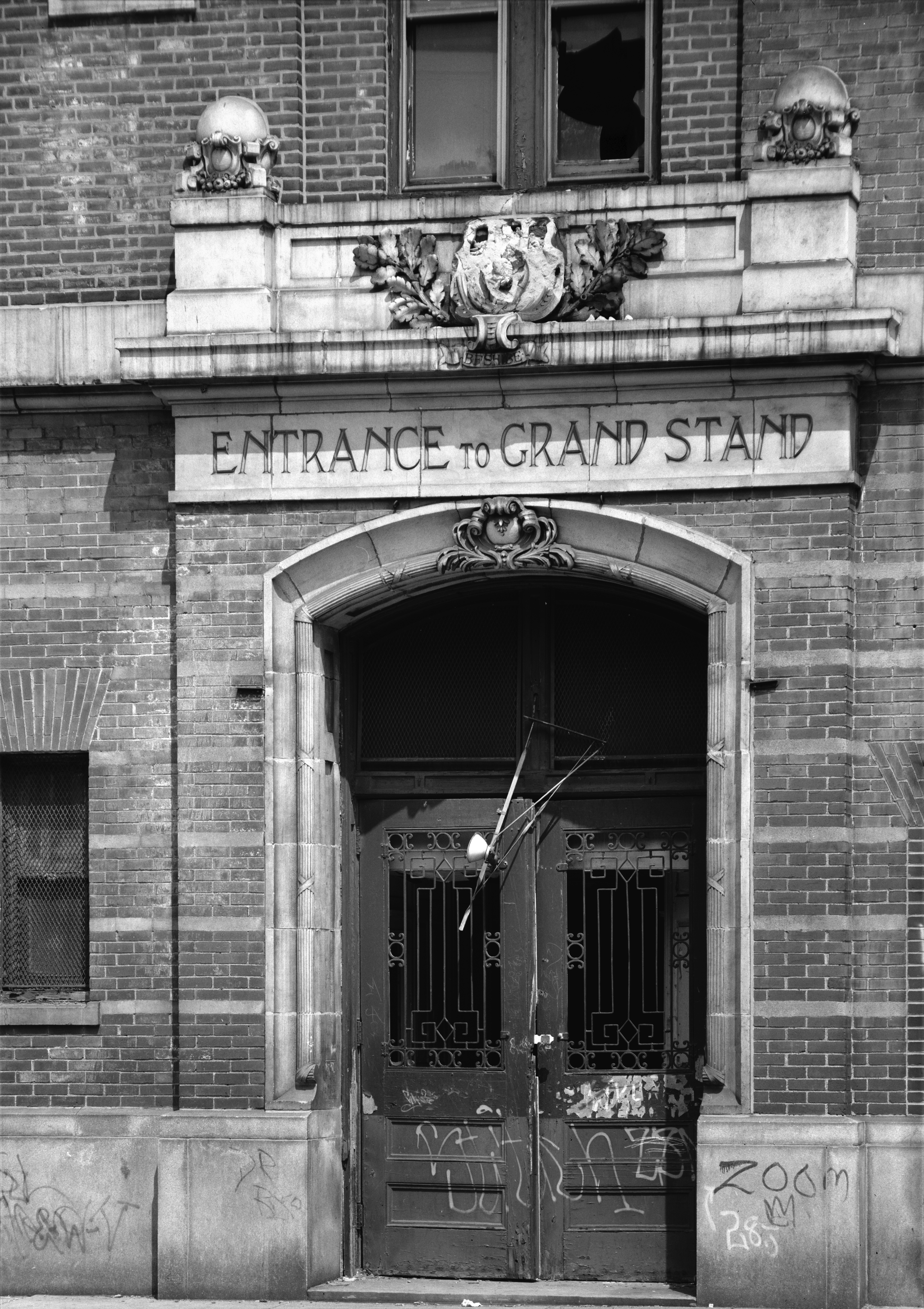
Grandstand entrance on Lehigh

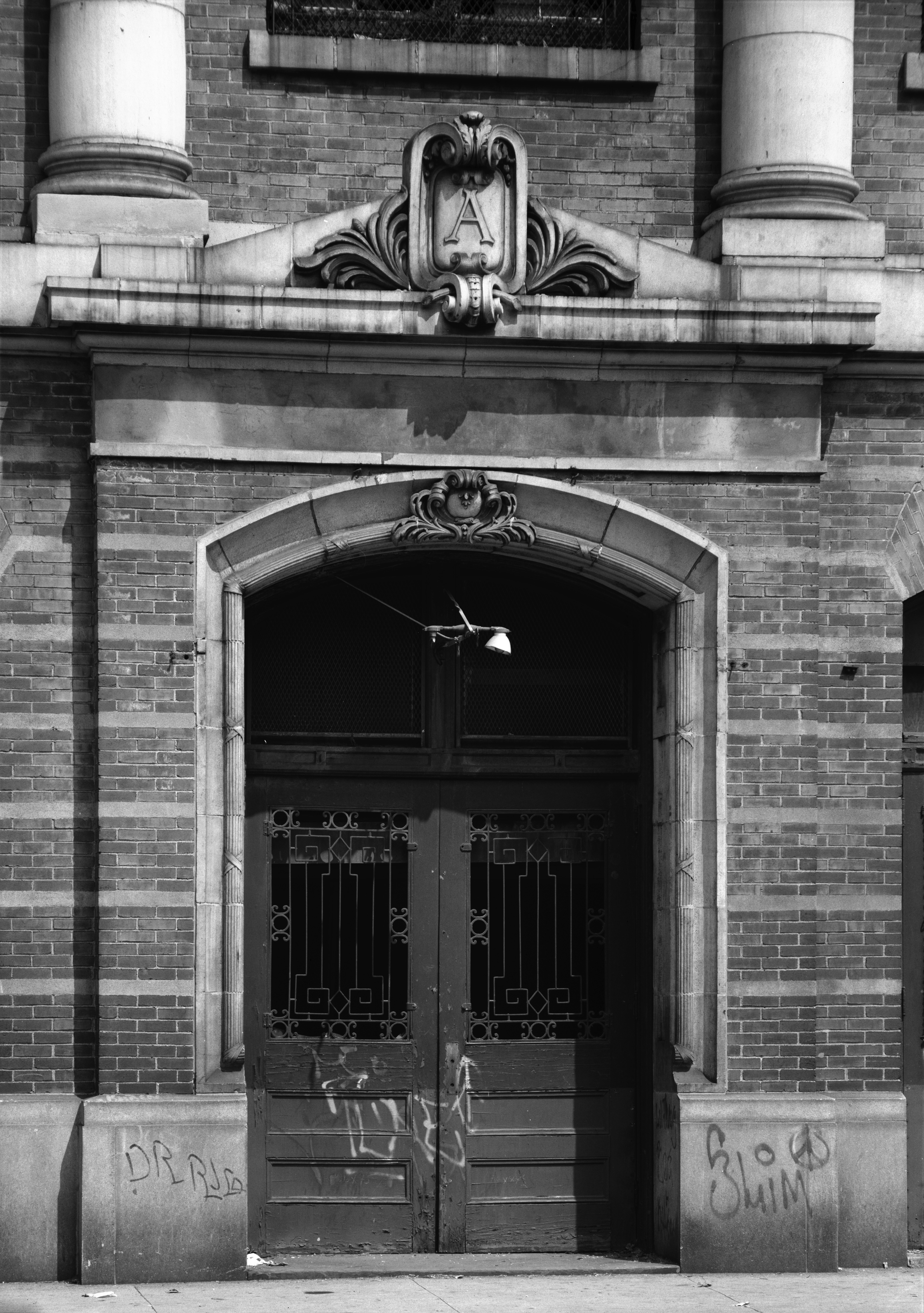
Entrance detail with A logo above

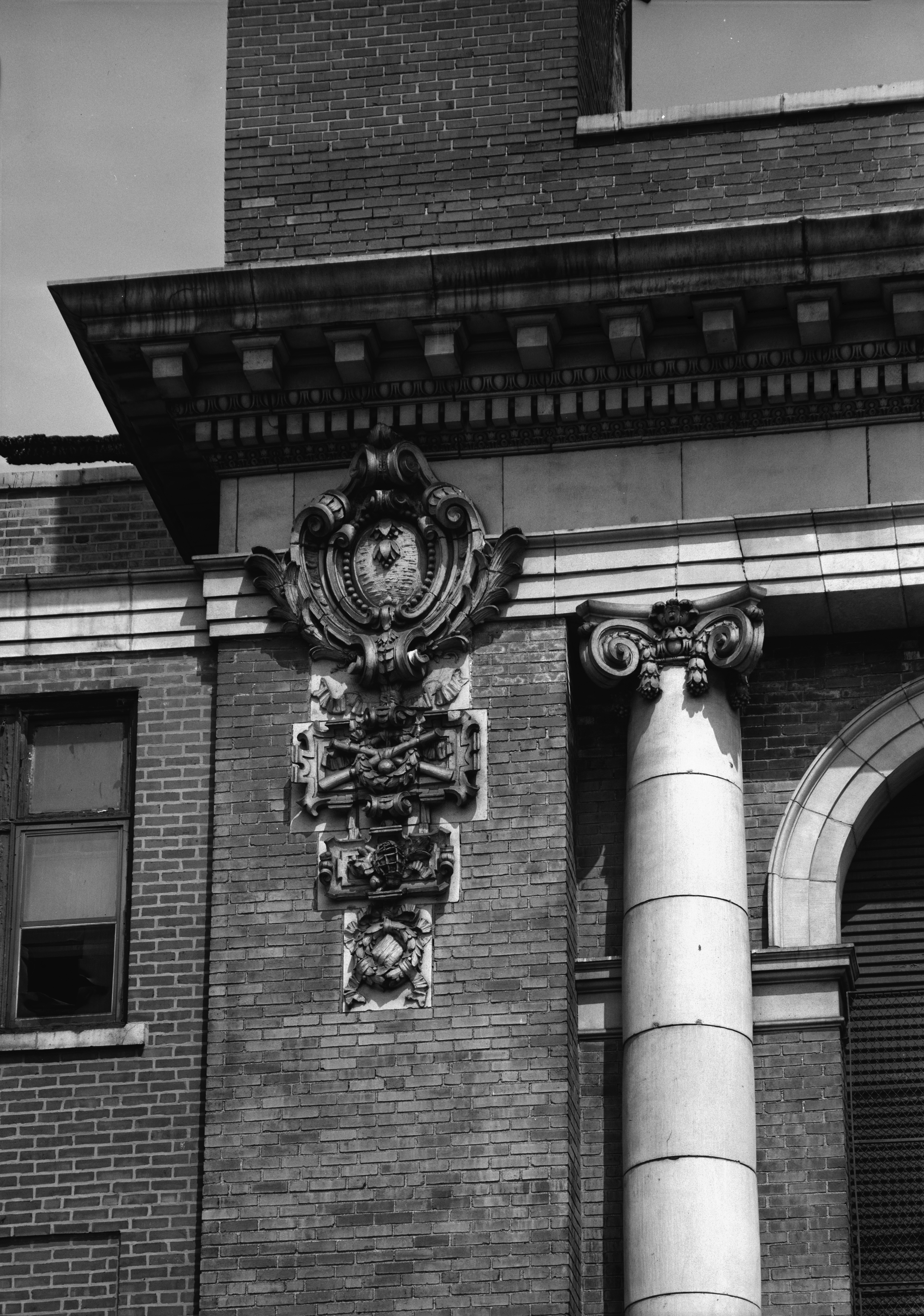
Bas-relief with baseball motifs

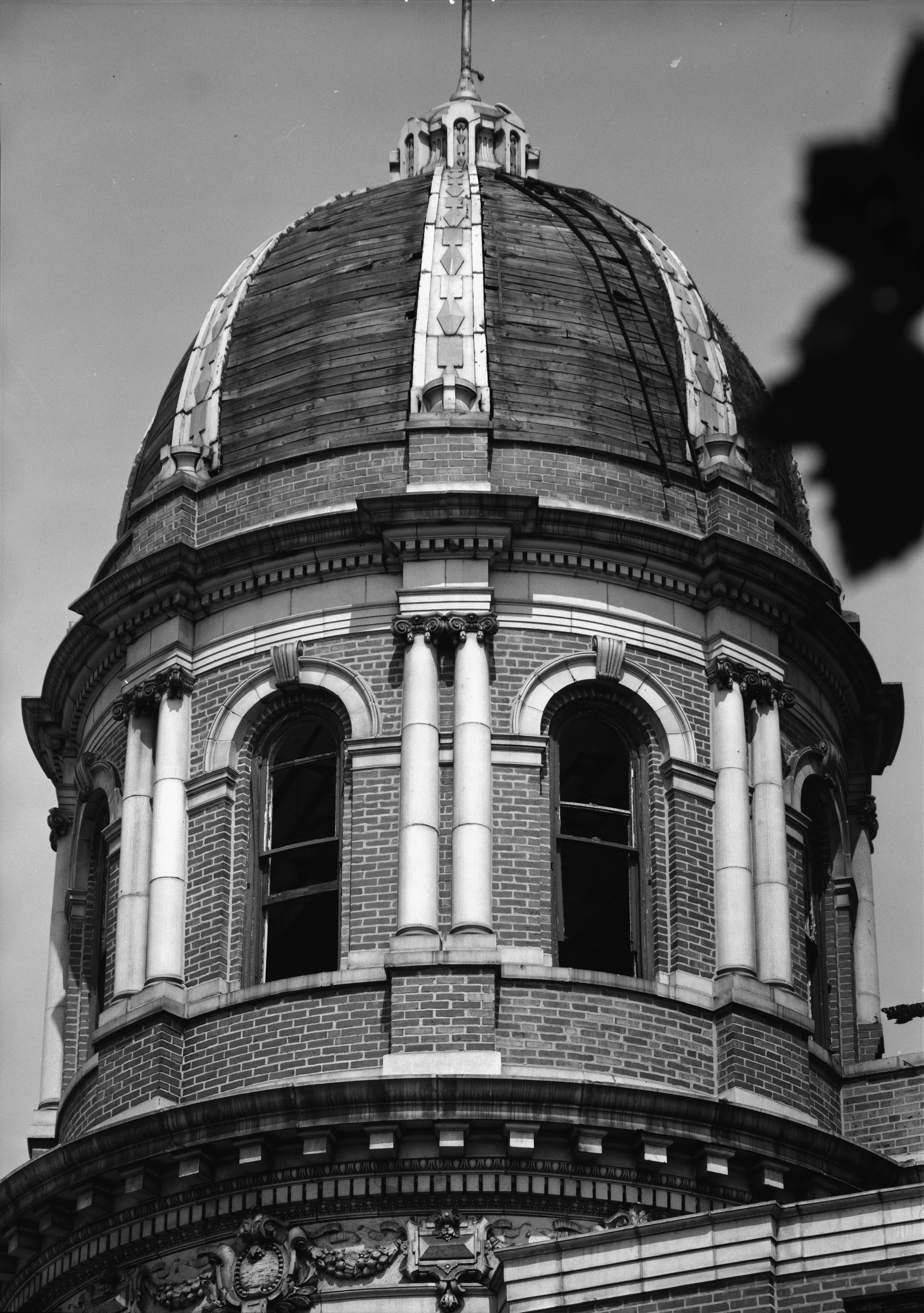
Detail of cupola, corner tower

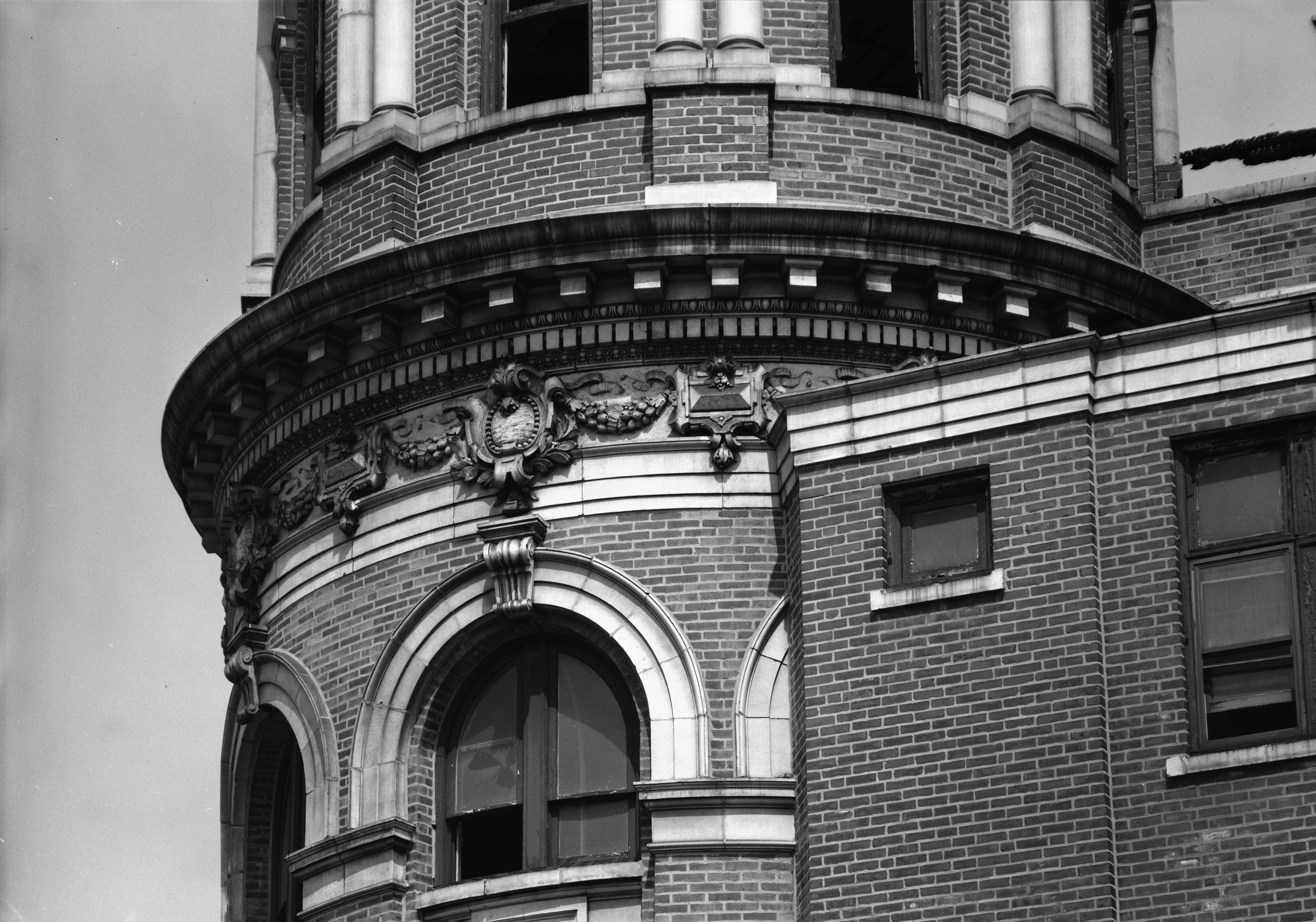
Bas-relief on cornice of tower

Events and tenants
Preceded by Columbia Park	Home of the Philadelphia Athletics; 1909–1954	Succeeded by Kansas City Municipal Stadium
Preceded by Baker Bowl	Home of the Philadelphia Phillies; 1938–1970	Succeeded by Veterans Stadium
Preceded by Philadelphia Municipal Stadium	Home of the Philadelphia Eagles; 1940; 1942–1957	Succeeded by Philadelphia Municipal Stadium; Franklin Field
Preceded by Polo Grounds; Briggs Stadium	Host of the All-Star Game; 1943; 1952	Succeeded by Forbes Field; Crosley Field
Preceded by Polo Grounds	Host of the NFL All-Star Game; 1942	Succeeded by Final Venue
