= Solar Shade Control Act =

The Solar Shade Control Act was passed by the California state legislature and signed by Governor Jerry Brown in 1978 to give solar collectors access to sunlight. The act limits blocking access to solar collectors by trees on an adjacent property, and formerly provided criminal penalties for violation. The solar collectors may be used for water heating, space heating or cooling, or electricity generation.

The law was amended in 2009, allowing trees to remain, if they were planted before the solar collector was installed. The amendment also changed violations from criminal to a civil matter.

== Application ==
The law attracted little attention until 2008, when a dispute in Sunnyvale, California ended up in court. The tree owners spent $37,000 on attorney fees, before trimming their trees.

In Culver City, California, a furniture and cabinet maker spent $80,000 in May 2006 on solar panels to reduce his electric bill. The system worked well for two years, until his neighbor spent $60,000 to plant palm trees along the property line. The city became involved in trying to negotiate a compromise.

In a 1986 dispute in involving two Stanford professors, the Court of Appeals of California, Sixth District ruled in Sher v. Leiderman that the law only applied to solar collectors, and not to homes designed to be passively heated by sunlight. The court reasoned that applying the act to passively heated homes would have given protection to all homes with windows facing south.
