= History of the Athletics =

The history of the Athletics Major League Baseball franchise spans the period from 1901 to the present day, having begun as a charter member franchise in the new American League in Philadelphia before moving to Kansas City in 1955 for 13 seasons and then to the San Francisco Bay in Oakland, California, in 1968 for 57 seasons. The team endured numerous attendance issues stemming from the aging Oakland Coliseum before the MLB owners approved the team's application to relocate to Las Vegas, Nevada in 2023. With four locations, the A's have had the most homes of any MLB team.

== Philadelphia (1901–1954) ==
=== Beginning ===
Philadelphia Athletics primary logo 1902–1921.

The Western League was renamed the American League in 1900 by league president Bancroft (Ban) Johnson and declared itself the second major league in 1901. Johnson created new franchises in the east and eliminated some franchises in the west. Philadelphia was given a new franchise to compete with the National League's Philadelphia Phillies.

Former catcher Connie Mack was recruited to manage the club and persuaded Phillies minority owner Ben Shibe as well as others to invest in the team. The name of the team, Philadelphia Athletics, is a name taken from the 1876 NL Athletic Base Ball Club of Philadelphia.

Columbia Park was the Athletics first home. They played there from their founding in 1901 through the 1908 season, and it was the venue of their two home games in the 1905 World Series.

=== First dynasty and aftermath ===
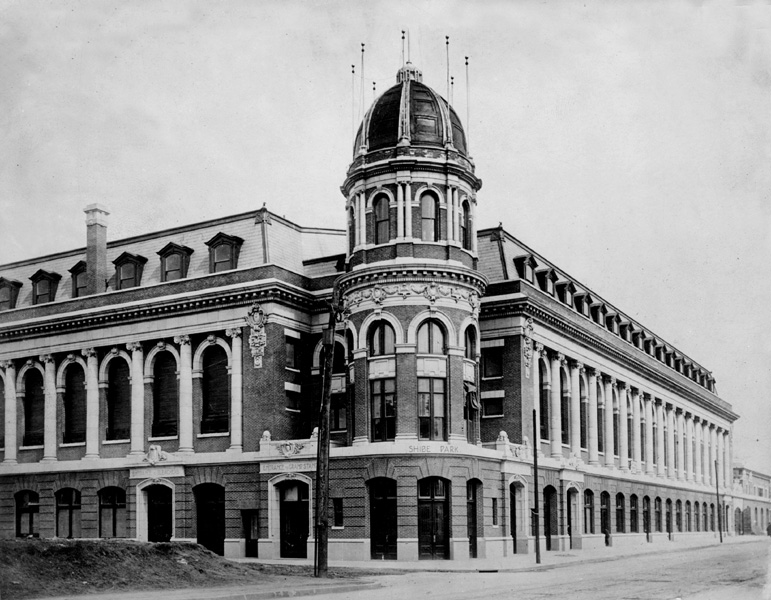
The signature tower and cupola entrance to Shibe Park, 1909

In the early years, the Athletics established themselves as one of the dominant teams in the new league, winning the AL pennant six times (1902, 1905, 1910, 1911, 1913, and 1914), and winning the World Series in 1910, 1911, and 1913, led by its "$100,000 infield." They won over 100 games in 1910 and 1911, and 99 games in 1914.

In 1909, the Athletics moved into the major leagues' first concrete-and-steel ballpark, Shibe Park. This remains the second and last time in franchise history where a new ballpark was built specifically for the Athletics. In 1912, Mack bought the 25% of the team's stock owned by Sam Jones and Frank Hough to become a full partner with Shibe. Shibe ceded Mack full control over the baseball side while retaining control over the business side. However, Mack had already enjoyed a nearly free hand in baseball matters since the franchise's inception.

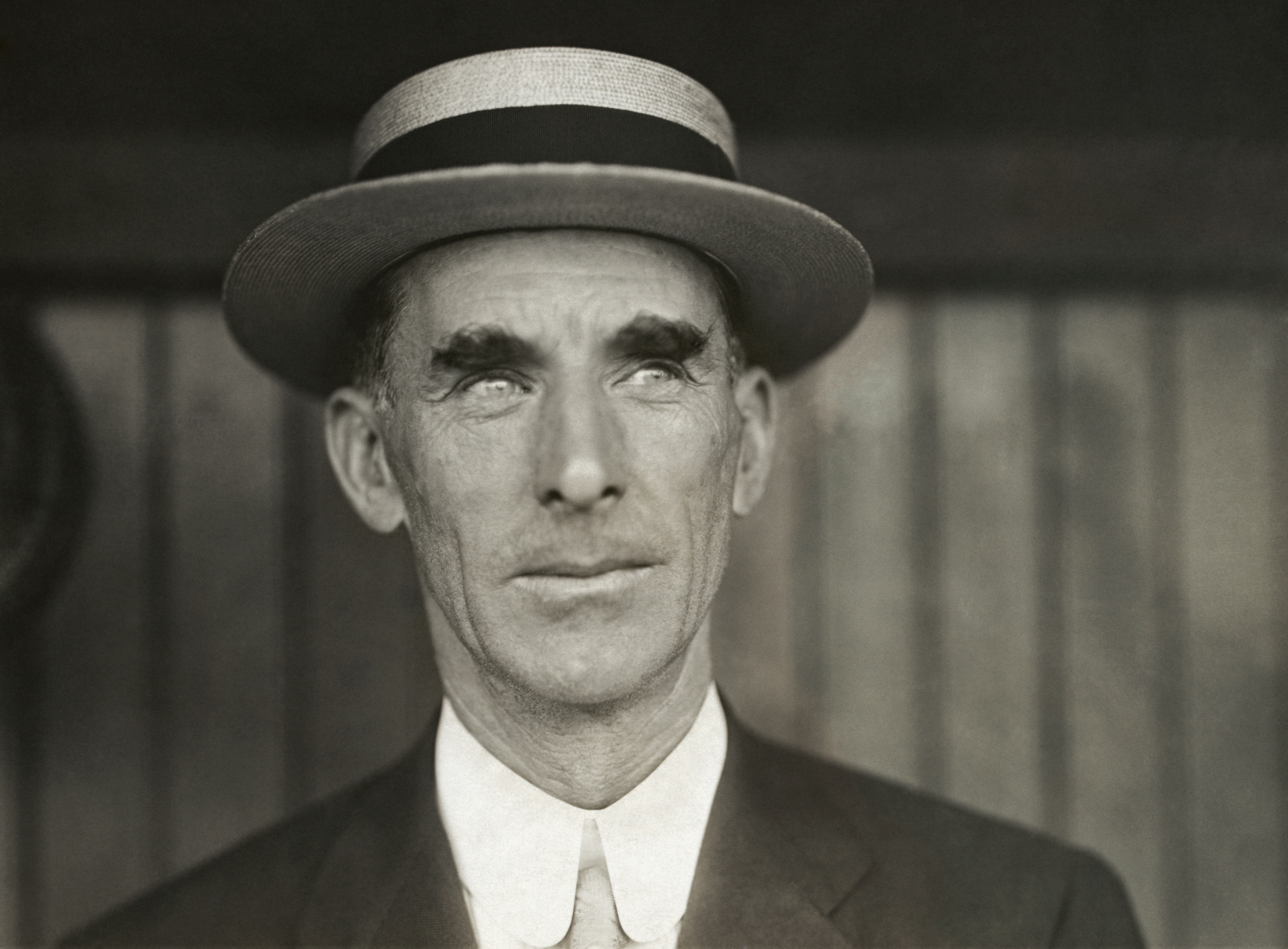
Longtime manager Connie Mack, pictured in 1911

In 1914, the Athletics lost the 1914 World Series to the "Miracle Braves" in a four-game sweep. Mack traded, sold or released most of the team's star players soon after. In his book To Every Thing a Season, Bruce Kuklick points out that there were suspicions that the Athletics had thrown the Series, or at least "laid down," perhaps in protest of Mack's frugal ways. Mack himself alluded to that rumor years later but debunked it. He claimed that the team was torn by numerous internal factions and was also distracted by the allure of a third major league, the Federal League, which began play in 1914 and raided players from the AL and NL teams. Mack refused to match the upstart league's offers, preferring to rebuild with younger (and less expensive) players. The result was a swift and near-total collapse, as the 1914 pennant winning Athletics collapsed to a modern major-league low record of 36–117 (.235) in 1916. The team would finish in last place every year through 1922 and would not contend again until 1925. Shibe died in 1922, and his sons Tom and John took over the business side, leaving the baseball side to Mack, who for all intents and purposes, was now the head of the franchise, and would remain so for the next three decades.

=== Second dynasty (1927–1933) ===
Philadelphia Athletics jersey logo, 1928–1949.

By the latter half of the 1920s, Mack had assembled one of the most feared batting orders in the history of baseball, featuring three future Baseball Hall of Fame members, including Al Simmons, Jimmie Foxx, and Mickey Cochrane. A fourth future Hall of Fame member was pitcher Lefty Grove. In 1927 and 1928, the Athletics finished second to the New York Yankees, then won pennants in 1929, 1930 and 1931, winning the World Series in 1929 and 1930. In each of the three years, the Athletics won over 100 games. While the 1927 New York Yankees, whose batting order was known as the Murderers' Row, are remembered as one of the best teams in baseball history, the Athletics teams of the late 1920s and early 1930s are largely forgotten. Opponents who faced both teams considered them to be generally equal. Both teams won three consecutive pennants and two of three World Series. Many veteran baseball observers believe that the Yankees' far more exalted status in history is due largely to the fact that they played in New York, where most of the national media is located.

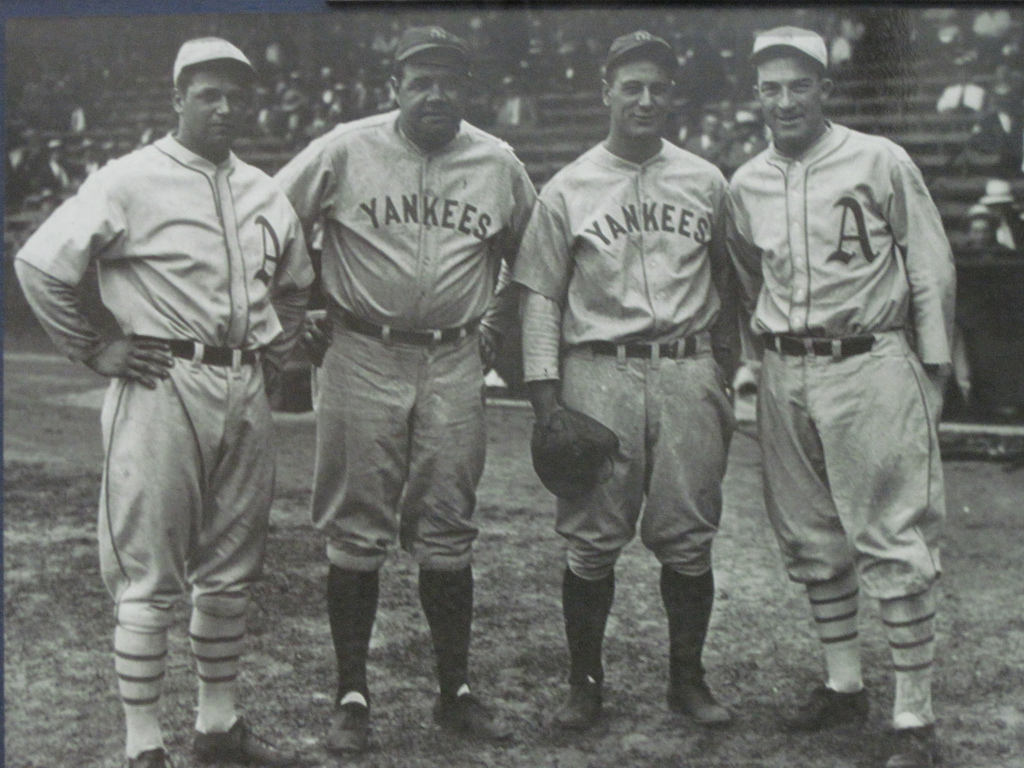
Jimmie Foxx, Babe Ruth, Lou Gehrig and Al Simmons

As it turned out, this would be the Athletics' last hurrah in Philadelphia. The Great Depression was well under way, and declining attendance drastically reduced the team's revenues. Mack again sold or traded his best players in order to reduce expenses. In September 1932, he sold Simmons, Jimmy Dykes and Mule Haas to the Chicago White Sox for $100,000. In December 1933, Mack sent Grove, Rube Walberg and Max Bishop to the Boston Red Sox for Bob Kline, Rabbit Warstler and $125,000. Also in 1933, he sold Cochrane to the Detroit Tigers for $100,000. The construction of a spite fence at Shibe Park, blocking the view from nearby buildings, only served to irritate potential paying fans. However, the consequences did not become apparent for a few more years, as the team finished second in 1932 and third in 1933.

=== Lean years ===
Mack was already 68 years old when the Athletics won the pennant in 1931, and many felt that the game had long since passed him by. Although he had every intention of building another winner, he did not have the extra money to get big stars. He also did not (or could not) invest in a farm system. Unlike most other owners, Mack had no source of income apart from the Athletics, so the dwindling attendance figures of the early 1930s hit him especially hard.

As a result, the Athletics went into a decline that lasted for over 30 years, through three cities. The Athletics finished fifth in 1934, then last in 1935. Except for a fifth-place finish in 1944, they finished in last or next-to-last place every year through 1946. Tom Shibe died in 1936 and John succeeded him as club president. However, John resigned due to illness a few months later, leaving the presidency to Mack. When John died on July 11, 1937, Mack bought enough shares from the Shibe estate to become majority owner. However, Mack had been the franchise's number-one man since Ben Shibe's death. Even as bad as the Athletics got during this time, Mack retained full authority over business and baseball matters. Long after most teams hired a general manager, Mack continued making all personnel decisions and leading the team on the field. One of the few times that he even considered ceding some of his duties came in the 1934–35 offseason, when the Athletics were not far removed from what would be their last great era. He seriously entertained hiring Babe Ruth to succeed him as manager, but backed off from this idea, saying that the Babe's wife, Claire, would be running the team within a month. Even when the Phillies moved to Shibe Park as tenants of the Athletics midway through the 1938 season, not enough revenue came in for Mack to build another winner.

By the mid-1940s, as Mack passed his 80th birthday, he was showing unmistakable signs of mental deterioration, almost to the point of senility. He would frequently sleep through innings, make bad calls that his coaches simply ignored, have inexplicable fits of anger, or call players from decades earlier to pinch-hit. Mack also never installed a telephone in the dugout and instead would use a series of obtuse hand signs to signal his coaches on the field. For the most part, Mack's coaches handled in-game operations. Nonetheless, despite calls inside and outside the organization to step down, Mack would not even consider firing himself. Also, during this time, Mack gave minority stakes in the team to his sons, Roy, Earle and Connie Jr., with the intention to have all three of them inherit the team upon his death. He also intended for Earle, who had been assistant manager since 1924, to succeed him as manager. This decision would have dire consequences for the Athletics later on.

During this time, Shibe Park was also becoming an increasing liability. While the facility had been state of the art when it opened in 1909, by the late 1940s, it had not been well maintained in some time. It was also not suited to automobile traffic, having been designed before the Ford Model T was introduced.

=== Final years ===
Philadelphia Athletics cap logo, 1951–1953.

Surprisingly, in 1947 the Athletics finished with a winning record for the first time in 14 years. They contended for much of 1948, and most of the summer in either first or second place, though due to the firing of a number of pitchers, the team faded to fourth place by season's end. The franchise would not be a factor in a pennant race again at that late date until 1969—their second year in Oakland. Another winning record in 1949 sparked hopes that 1950—the 50th season for both the American League and Mack's tenure as manager of the Athletics—would bring a pennant at last. During that year, the team wore uniforms trimmed in blue and gold, in honor of the Golden Jubilee of "The Grand Old Man of Baseball." However, the 1950 season was an unmitigated disaster, as they were already out of contention by the end of May. Before May was out, Mack's sons had agreed to ease their father out as manager. On May 26, it was announced that Mack would resign at the end of the season. On the same day, former Athletics star Jimmy Dykes, who had returned to the Athletics as a coach a year earlier, was named assistant manager and would transition to manager for the 1951 season. However, for all practical purposes, Dykes took over as manager immediately; he was given control over the Athletics' day-to-day operations and became the team's main game-day operator. Cochrane, who had been brought back as a coach earlier in the year, was named general manager, stripping Connie Sr. of his last direct authority over baseball matters. Ultimately, the Athletics finished with the worst record in the majors at 52–102, 46 games out of first. Mack's 50-year tenure is a North American professional sports record for manager/head coach that has never been threatened. They would have only one winning record from 1951 to 1954—a fourth-place finish in 1952. The nadir came in 1954, when the Athletics finished with a ghastly 51–103 record, easily the worst record in baseball and 60 games out of first.

At the same time, the Phillies, who had been the definition of baseball futility for over 30 years, began a surprisingly quick climb to respectability. The Athletics were the more popular team in Philadelphia for most of the first half of the century, even though for much of the last decade they had been as bad or worse than the Phillies. But in the 1940s, the Phillies began spending lavishly on young prospects. The impact was immediate. In 1947, the Athletics finished fourth in the American League while the Phillies tied for the worst record in the National League. Just three years later, the Athletics compiled the worst record in the majors and the Phillies went all the way to the 1950 World Series. It soon became obvious that the Phillies had passed the Athletics as Philadelphia's number-one team.

=== Selling the team ===
A power struggle that had developed between Roy and Earle Mack on one side and Connie Jr. and the Shibes on the other came to a head in July 1950, when Connie Jr. and the Shibes decided to sell the team. However, Roy and Earle insisted that they have a 30-day option to buy out Connie Jr. and the Shibes before the team was put on the market. Connie Jr. did not think Roy and Earle could get the $1.74 million required to buy him out, but Roy and Earle called their bluff by mortgaging the team to Connecticut General Life Insurance Company (now part of CIGNA) and pledging Shibe Park as collateral. The mortgage deal closed on August 26. The shares of Connie Jr. and the Shibes were retired, ending the Shibes' half-century involvement with the Athletics and making Connie Sr., Roy and Earle the team's only shareholders. Although his father remained nominal owner and team president, Roy, who had been vice president since 1936, now became operating head of the franchise, sharing day-to-day control with Earle. However, under the terms of the mortgage, the A's were now saddled with payments of $200,000 over the first five years, depriving them of badly needed capital that could have been used improving the team and the park. Attendance plummeted, and there was nowhere near enough revenue to service the mortgage debt.

In response, Roy and Earle began cutting costs even further. They turned over the rent from the Phillies to Connecticut General and took cash advances from their concessions contractor. The cost-cutting ramped up even further in the 1953–54 offseason, when they slashed over $100,000 from the player payroll, fired general manager Arthur Ehlers and replaced Dykes as manager with shortstop Eddie Joost. They also pared down the minor-league system to only six clubs. However, even with these measures, there still wasn't nearly enough money coming in to service the mortgage debt, and Roy and Earle began feuding with each other. By the summer of 1954, it was obvious that the Athletics were on an irreversible slide into bankruptcy. Earle and Roy decided that there was no choice but to sell the Athletics, with sorrowful approval from Connie Sr.

Although several offers were put forward by Philadelphia interests, American League president Will Harridge was convinced that the team could never be viable in Philadelphia. The sparse crowds at Shibe had been a source of frustration for some time to the other AL owners, as they could not even begin to meet their expenses for trips to Philadelphia. As a result, Harridge had come to believe that the only way to resolve the "Philadelphia problem" was to move the Athletics elsewhere. For this reason, when Chicago businessman Arnold Johnson offered to buy the team, the other owners pressured Roy Mack to agree to the sale. Johnson had very close ties to the Yankees; he not only owned Yankee Stadium but also owned Blues Stadium in Kansas City, home to the Yankees' top farm team. Johnson intended to move the Athletics to a renovated Blues Stadium if he was cleared to buy them. The Yankees made no secret that they favored Johnson, and their backing gave him the upper hand with the other owners. After an October 12 owners meeting at which several offers from Philadelphia interests were rejected as inadequate (Harridge later said that while several of them "talked about millions," they didn't have any money behind them), Mack agreed in principle to sell the Athletics to Johnson no later than October 18.

However, on October 17, Roy Mack suddenly announced that the Athletics had been sold to a Philadelphia-based group headed by auto dealer John Crisconi, with Roy having an option to buy a minority stake. The deal was to be approved at an American League owners' meeting on October 28. It looked headed for approval when rumors (reportedly planted by the Yankees) cropped up that the Crisconi group was underfinanced, and Johnson collared Roy Mack at Roy's home to persuade him that his original deal was better for his family in the long run. On October 28, the sale to the Crisconi group came up one vote short of the five needed for approval, with Roy Mack voting against the deal he had just negotiated. While Connie and Earle had joined Roy in signing the contract to sell their stakes to Crisconi, the league's rejection voided the deal.

A day later, Connie Mack released an open letter to Athletics fans (one that was likely written by his wife) blasting the owners and Roy for sinking the deal to the Crisconi group. However, he conceded that he didn't have enough money to run the Athletics in 1955, and the Johnson deal was the only one that had any prospect of winning league approval. A few days later, the Macks sold the Athletics to Johnson for $3.5 million, $1.5 million for their shares plus $2 million in debt. Selling Shibe Park—which had been renamed Connie Mack Stadium a year earlier—proved more difficult, but the Phillies reluctantly bought it. The American League owners met again on November 8, and duly approved Johnson's bid to buy the Athletics. Johnson's first act was to request permission to move to Kansas City. This proved more difficult, since it required a three-fourths majority. However, Detroit owner Spike Briggs was persuaded to change his vote, ending the Athletics' 54-year stay in Philadelphia.

== Kansas City (1955–1967) ==
=== Arnold Johnson era ===
Kansas City Athletics cap logo, 1955 to 1959.

In 1954, Chicago real estate magnate Arnold Johnson bought the Philadelphia Athletics and moved them to Kansas City, Missouri. Although he was initially viewed as a hero for making Kansas City a major-league town, it soon became apparent that he was motivated more by profit than any particular regard for the baseball fans of Kansas City. He had long been a business associate of New York Yankees owners Dan Topping, Larry MacPhail and Del Webb, and had even bought Yankee Stadium in 1953, though the league owners forced Johnson to sell the property before acquiring the Athletics. Johnson had also bought Blues Stadium in Kansas City, home of the Yankees' top Triple A level Minor league baseball farm team, the Kansas City Blues of the second American Association. After Johnson got permission from the American League to move the Athletics to Kansas City, he sold Blues Stadium to the city, which renamed it Kansas City Municipal Stadium and leased it back to Johnson. The lease gave Johnson a three-year escape clause if the team failed to draw one million or more customers per season. The subsequent lease signed in 1960 contained an escape clause that lowered that threshold to 850,000 per season.

Normally, Johnson would have had to pay the Yankees an indemnity for moving to Kansas City, and also would have had to reimburse the Yankees for the costs they incurred for moving the Blues to Denver as the Denver Bears to make way for the Athletics. Major-league rules of the time gave the Yankees the major-league rights to Kansas City. However, the Yankees waived these payments as soon as the purchase was approved. Even though the Yankees had no intention of going anywhere, the waivers led to rumors of collusion between Johnson and the Yankees. The rumors grew louder due to the Yankees' thinly concealed support for the sale, to the point of planting rumors in the press to derail an 11th-hour attempt to keep the Athletics in Philadelphia.

Rumors abounded that Johnson's real motive was to operate the Athletics in Kansas City for a few years, then move the team to Los Angeles (the Brooklyn Dodgers would later move there after the 1957 season). Whatever the concern about the move to Kansas City, fans turned out in record numbers for the era. In 1955, the Kansas City Athletics drew 1,393,054 to Municipal Stadium, a club record easily surpassing the previous record of 945,076 in 1948; in fact, it was the third-highest attendance figure in the majors, behind only the all-powerful Yankees and the also recently relocated Milwaukee Braves in the National League (1953–1965). That number would never be approached again while the team was in Kansas City, and would remain the club record for attendance until 1982—the Athletics' 15th season in Oakland. The Athletics of this era were barely competitive; in five years under Johnson's ownership, the closest they got to a winning record was 1958, when they finished 73–81, eight games below .500 and 19 games out of first.

During Johnson's tenure, virtually every good young Athletics player was traded to the Yankees for aging veterans and cash. Over the years, Johnson traded such key players as Roger Maris, Bobby Shantz, Héctor López, Clete Boyer, Art Ditmar and Ralph Terry to New York; in return, he did receive some talented younger players such as Norm Siebern and Jerry Lumpe, and the cash helped the team pay the bills. However, with few exceptions, the trades were heavily weighted in favor of the Yankees and arguably helped keep the Yankee dynasty afloat. For example, ten players from the 1961 Yankees, reckoned as one of the best teams of all time, came from the Athletics. This led to accusations from fans, reporters and even other teams that Johnson had reduced the Athletics to a Yankees farm team at the major-league level. Bill Veeck, for instance, recalled that under Johnson, the Athletics were "nothing more than a loosely controlled Yankee farm club."

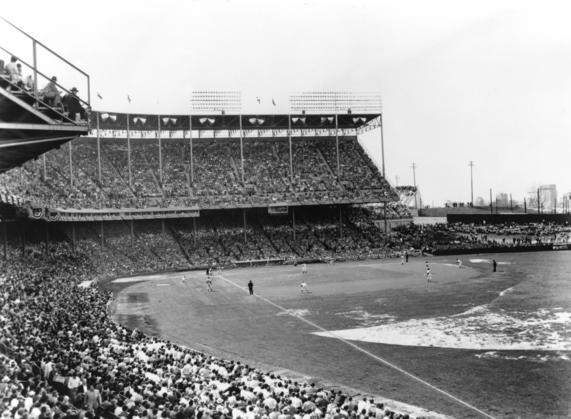
The Athletics played at Municipal Stadium during their time in Kansas City.

On the positive side, Johnson devoted attention to player development for the first time in the history of the franchise. Under longtime owner and manager Connie Mack, the Athletics did not or could not spend any money building a farm system, a major reason why Mack's Philadelphia teams fell from World Series champions to cellar-dwellers so quickly. When Johnson bought the team, the Athletics only had three scouts in the entire organization. Johnson did make some improvements to the farm system, but was unwilling to pay top dollar for players that could get the Athletics within sight of contention.

Johnson was returning from watching the Athletics in spring training when he was fatally stricken with a cerebral hemorrhage. He died in West Palm Beach, Florida on March 3, 1960, at the age of 53.

=== Charlie Finley era ===
Kansas City Athletics logo, 1965–1967

On December 19, 1960, Chicago insurance magnate Charlie Finley purchased a controlling interest in the team from Johnson's estate after losing out to Johnson six years earlier in Philadelphia. He bought out the minority owners a year later. Finley promised the fans a new day. In a highly publicized move, he purchased a bus, pointed it in the direction of New York, and burned it to symbolize the end of the "special relationship" with the Yankees. He called another press conference to burn the existing lease at Municipal Stadium which included the despised "escape clause". He spent over $400,000 of his own money in stadium improvements (though in 1962 the city reimbursed $300,000 of this). He introduced new uniforms which had "Kansas City" on the road uniforms for the first time ever and an interlocking "KC" on the cap. This was the first time the franchise had acknowledged its home city on its uniforms. He announced, "My intentions are to keep the A's permanently in Kansas City and build a winning ball club. I have no intention of ever moving the franchise." The fans, in turn, regarded Finley as the savior of Major League Baseball in Kansas City.

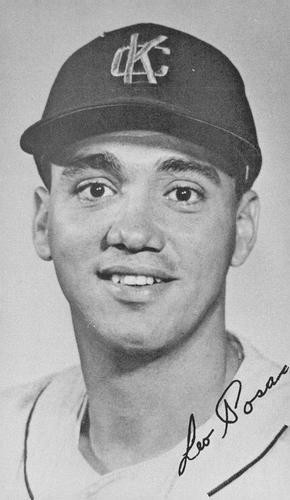
Leo Posada with the 1961 Athletics

Finley immediately hired Frank Lane, a veteran baseball man with a reputation as a prolific trader, as general manager. Lane began engineering trades with several other teams, including the Yankees, the bus-burning stunt notwithstanding. Lane lasted less than one year, being fired during the 1961 season. He was temporarily replaced by Pat Friday, whose sole qualification for the job was that he managed one of Finley's insurance offices. On paper, Friday remained general manager until 1965, when he was replaced by Hank Peters. After only a year, Peters was fired and replaced by Eddie Lopat, who also lasted only one season. After Lopat's ouster in 1966, the team had no formal general manager until 1981. In fact, Friday, Peters and Lopat were mere figureheads. With the firing of Lane in 1961, Finley effectively became the team's de facto general manager, and would remain so for the duration of his ownership.

Finley made further changes to the team's uniforms. The Philadelphia Athletics wore blue and white or black and gray outfits through most of their history; in the last years in Philadelphia and the first in Kansas City, the team used a red, white and navy blue scheme. In 1963, Finley changed the team's colors to "Kelly Green, Fort Knox Gold and Wedding Gown White". In June 1963, Bill Bryson wrote of the uniforms,

Kelly green is the Athletics' accent color. It was more a nauseous green the players wore on their wholesome, clean-cut faces the first few times they had to appear in public looking like refugees from a softball league.

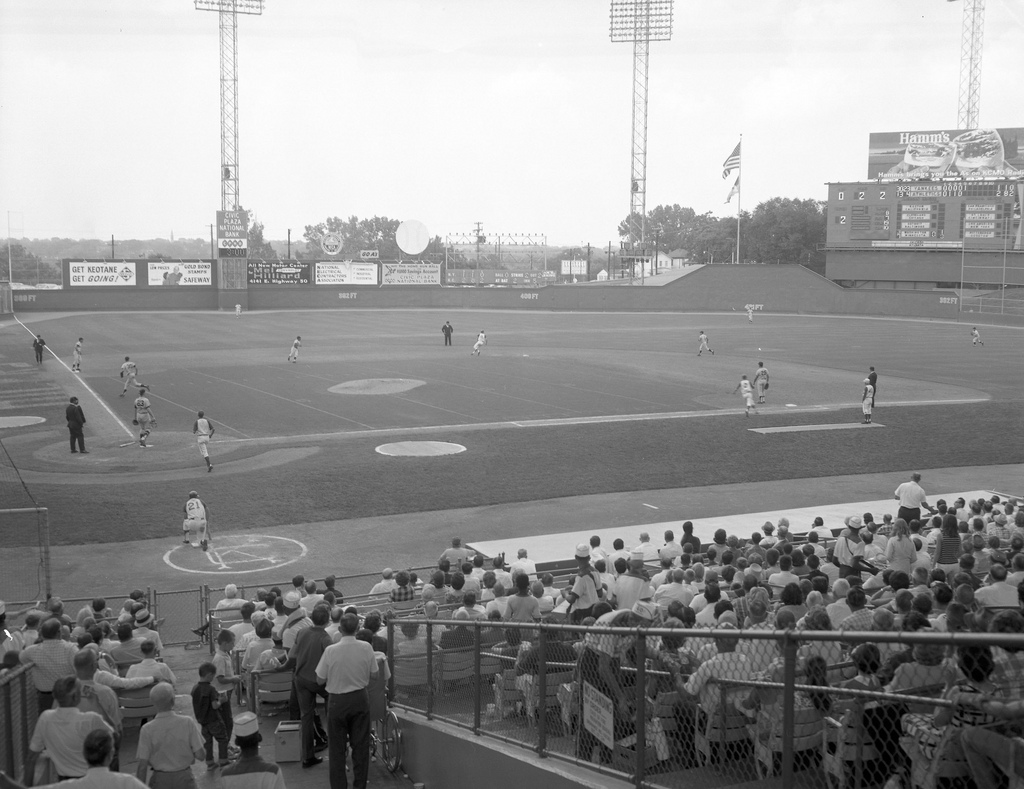
Yankees vs. Athletics at Municipal Stadium

Finley replaced Mack's elephant with a Missouri mule—not just a cartoon logo, but a real mule, which he named after himself: "Charlie O, the Mule". He also began phasing out the team name "Athletics" in favor of simply "A's". Some of his other changes—for instance, his repeated attempts to mimic Yankee Stadium's famous right-field "home run porch"—were less successful. AL President Joe Cronin ordered Finley to remove the fence which duplicated the 296-foot right-field foul line in Yankee Stadium. Smarting from this edict from the league office, Finley ordered Municipal Stadium PA announcer Jack Layton to announce, "That would have been a home run in Yankee Stadium", whenever a fly ball passed the limit in Municipal Stadium's outfield. That practice ended quickly, however, when it was apparent that other teams were hitting more "would-be" home runs than the Athletics.

While the Athletics were still dreadful in the first eight years of Finley's ownership, he began to lay the groundwork for a future contender. Finley poured significant resources into the minor league system for the first time in the history of the franchise. By 1966, the Athletics were reckoned as having the strongest farm system in the majors. He was assisted by the creation of the Major League Baseball draft in 1965, which forced young prospects to sign with the team that drafted them—at the price offered by the team—if they wanted to play professional baseball. Thus, Finley was spared from having to compete with wealthier teams for top talent. The Athletics, owners of the worst record in the American League in 1964, had the first pick in the first draft, selecting Rick Monday on June 8, 1965.

=== Finley looks for a way out ===
Almost as soon as the ink dried on his purchase of the Athletics, Finley began shopping the Athletics to other cities despite his promises that the Athletics would remain in Kansas City. Soon after the lease-burning stunt, it was discovered that what actually burned was a blank boilerplate commercial lease available at any stationery store. The actual lease was still in force—including the escape clause. Finley later admitted that the whole thing was a publicity stunt, and he had no intention of amending the lease.

In 1961 and 1962, Finley talked to people in Dallas-Fort Worth and a four-man group appeared before American League owners, but no formal motion was put forward to move the team to Texas. In January 1964, he signed an agreement on to move the Athletics to Louisville, promising to change the team's name to the "Kentucky Athletics". (Other names suggested for the team were the "Louisville Sluggers" and "Kentucky Colonels", which would have allowed the team to keep the letters "KC" on their uniforms.) The owners turned it down by a 9–1 margin on January 16, with Finley being the only one voting in favor. Six weeks later, by the same 9–1 margin, the A.L. owners denied Finley's request to move the team to Oakland.

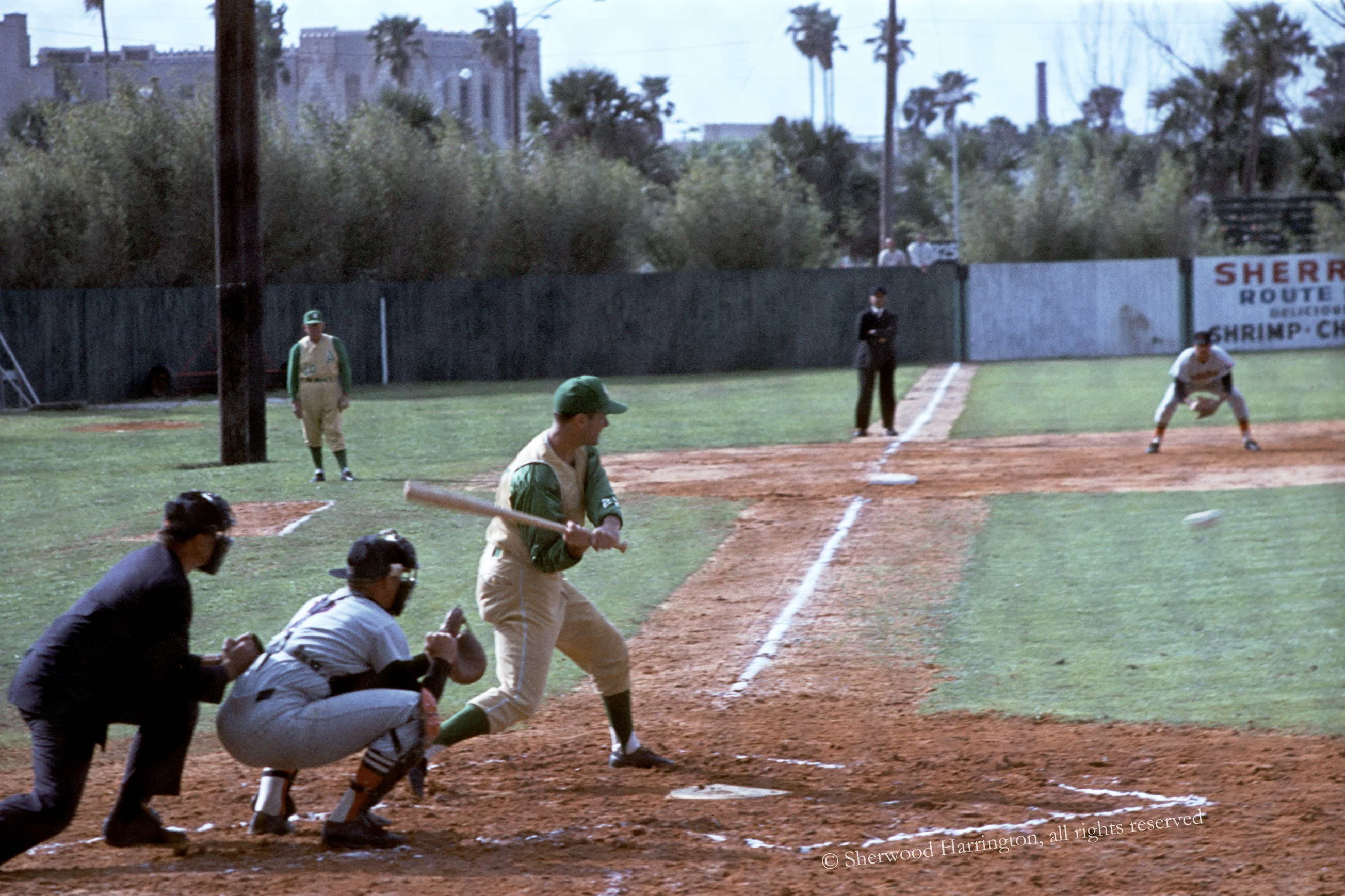
Rocky Colavito 1964 Kansas City Athletics Spring Training

These requests came as no surprise, as impending moves to these cities, as well as to Atlanta, Milwaukee, New Orleans, San Diego, and Seattle—all of which Finley had considered as new homes for the Athletics—had long been afloat. He also threatened to move the Athletics to a "cow pasture" in Peculiar, Missouri, complete with temporary grandstands. Not surprisingly, attendance tailed off. The city rejected Finley's offer of a two-year lease agreement; finally, American League President Joe Cronin persuaded Finley to sign a four-year lease with Municipal Stadium in February 1964.

During the World Series on October 11, 1967, Finley announced his choice of Oakland over Seattle as the team's new home. A week later on October 18 in Chicago, A.L. owners at last gave him permission to move the Athletics to Oakland for the 1968 season. According to some reports, Cronin promised Finley that he could move the team after the 1967 season as an incentive to sign the new lease with Municipal Stadium. The move came despite approval by voters in Jackson County, Missouri of a bond issue for a brand new baseball stadium (the eventual Royals Stadium, now Kauffman Stadium) to be completed in 1973. Senator Stuart Symington of Missouri blasted Finley on the floor of the U.S. Senate, calling him an "all-American disgrace to sport" and "one of the most disreputable characters ever to enter the American sports scene." (Symington is often quoted as saying in this speech that "Oakland is the luckiest city since Hiroshima," but there is no evidence he ever made such a statement.) When Symington threatened to have baseball's antitrust exemption revoked, the owners responded with a hasty round of expansion. Kansas City was awarded an American League expansion team, the Royals. They were initially slated to begin play in 1971, but Symington was not willing to have Kansas City wait three years for another team, and renewed his threat to have baseball's antitrust exemption revoked unless the expansion teams—the Royals and the Seattle Pilots—began play in 1969, two years earlier than originally planned. The owners complied, but while Kansas City was major league ready, Seattle was not; its stadium problems affected profitability and ultimately forced the sale and move to Milwaukee after only one season as the Pilots.

During the Johnson years, the Athletics' home attendance averaged just under one million per season, respectable numbers for the era, especially in light of the team's dreadful on-field performance. In contrast, during the years of Finley's ownership, the team averaged under 680,000 per year in Kansas City. According to baseball writer Rob Neyer (a native of the Kansas City area), this was largely because Finley tried to sell baseball tickets like he sold insurance. Just before the 1960 season, he mailed brochures to 600,000 people in the area, and only made $20,000 in ticket sales. During their thirteen years in Kansas City, the Athletics' overall record was 829–1224 (.404), and the best season was 1966 at 74–86 (.463).

== Oakland (1968–2024) ==
=== A new home and the emergence of a powerhouse (1968–1970) ===
The Athletics' Oakland tenure opened with a 3–1 loss to the Baltimore Orioles on April 10, 1968, and their first game in Oakland was on April 17, a 4–1 loss to the Orioles. They played their home games at the recently opened Oakland–Alameda County Coliseum, the home of the AFL's Oakland Raiders, with whom they shared the stadium. The Athletics drew national attention when, on May 8, 1968, Jim "Catfish" Hunter pitched a perfect game (the American League's first during the regular season since 1922) against the Minnesota Twins. The Athletics, under the leadership of manager Bob Kennedy, ended the 1968 campaign with an 82–80 record, their first winning record since 1952 (in Philadelphia). The team's output also represented a 20-win increase over the prior year's 62–99 finish. Bob Kennedy was fired at the end of the season.

Expansion brought optimism to Athletics fans after AL owners (unlike their counterparts in the National League) decided to realign their league strictly based on geography. Despite finishing in sixth place and only two games above .500 in 1968, Oakland actually had the best record of the four established teams to join the AL West, which also contained the two expansion teams. The Athletics began the 1969 season under the leadership of Hank Bauer. On July 20, 1969, future ace Vida Blue made his major league debut with a start against the California Angels. The Athletics' on-field performance continued to improve; led by Reggie Jackson's 47 home runs, the Athletics finished the season with a record of 88–74. However, this was only good enough for second place behind the Minnesota Twins, and was not good enough for Finley, who had been expecting his team to win the division title. Hank Bauer was fired (and replaced with John McNamara) near the end of the season. The team's record stood at 80–69 at the time of his firing. McNamara himself would be fired following an 89–73 finish in 1970. He was replaced by former Boston Red Sox manager Dick Williams.

=== Swingin' A's (1971–1975) ===
The Athletics, following two consecutive second-place finishes, finally claimed the division crown in 1971. The Athletics would win 101 games (their first 100-win season since finishing 107–45 in 1931). However, they lost to the Baltimore Orioles in the American League Championship Series. In 1972, the Athletics won their first league pennant since 1931 and faced the Cincinnati Reds in the World Series.

That year, the Athletics began wearing solid green or solid gold jerseys, with contrasting white pants, at a time when most other teams wore all-white uniforms at home and all-grey ones on the road. Similar to more colorful amateur softball uniforms, they were considered a radical departure for their time. Furthermore, in conjunction with a Moustache Day promotion, Finley offered $300 to any player who grew a moustache by Father's Day, at a time when every other team forbade facial hair. When Father's Day arrived, every member of the team collected a bonus. The 1972 World Series against the Cincinnati Reds was termed "The Hairs vs. the Big Squares", as the Reds wore more traditional uniforms and required their players to be clean-shaven and short-haired. A contemporaneous book about the team was called Mustache Gang. The Athletics' seven-game victory over the heavily favored Reds gave the team its first World Series Championship since 1930.

They defended their title in 1973 and 1974. Unlike Mack's champions, who thoroughly dominated their opposition, the Athletics teams of the 1970s played well enough to win their division (which was usually known as the "American League Least" during this time). They then defeated teams that had won more games during the regular season with good pitching, good defense, and clutch hitting. Finley called this team the "Swingin' A's". Players such as Reggie Jackson, Sal Bando, Joe Rudi, Bert Campaneris, Catfish Hunter, Rollie Fingers, and Vida Blue formed the nucleus of these teams.

The players often said in later years that they played so well as a team because almost to a man, they hated Finley with a passion. For instance, Finley threatened to pack Jackson off to the minors in 1969 after Jackson hit 47 homers; Commissioner Bowie Kuhn had to intervene in their contract dispute. Kuhn intervened again after Blue won the AL Cy Young Award in 1971 and Finley threatened to send him to the minors. Finley's tendency for micromanaging his team actually dated to the team's stay in Kansas City. Among the more notable incidents during this time was a near-mutiny in 1967; Finley responded by releasing the Athletics' best hitter, Ken Harrelson, who promptly signed with the Red Sox and helped lead them to the pennant.

The Athletics' victory over the New York Mets in the 1973 World Series was marred by Finley's antics. Finley forced Mike Andrews to sign a false affidavit saying he was injured after the reserve second baseman committed two consecutive errors in the 12th inning of the Athletics' Game 2 loss to the Mets. When Williams, Andrews' teammates, and virtually the entire viewing public rallied to Andrews' defense, Kuhn forced Finley to back down. However, there was nothing that said the Athletics had to play Andrews. Andrews entered Game 4 in the eighth inning as a pinch-hitter to a standing ovation from sympathetic Mets fans. He promptly grounded out, and Finley ordered him benched for the remainder of the Series. Andrews never played another major league game. As it was, the incident allowed the Mets, a team that went but 82–79 during the regular season, to stretch the Series to the full seven games against a far superior team. Williams was so disgusted by the affair that he resigned after the Series. Finley retaliated by vetoing Williams' attempt to become manager of the Yankees. Finley claimed that since Williams still owed Oakland the last year of his contract, he could not manage anywhere else. Finley relented later in 1974 and allowed Williams to take over as manager of the California Angels.

After the Athletics' victory over the Los Angeles Dodgers in the 1974 World Series (under Alvin Dark), pitcher Catfish Hunter filed a grievance, claiming that the team had violated its contract with Hunter by failing to make timely payment on an insurance policy during the 1974 season as called for. On December 13, 1974, arbitrator Peter Seitz ruled in Hunter's favor. As a result, Hunter became a free agent, and signed a contract with the Yankees for the 1975 season. Despite the loss of Hunter, the A's repeated as AL West champions in 1975, but lost the ALCS to Boston in a 3-game sweep.

=== Free agency, the dismantling of the A's, and the end of the Finley years ===
==== 1975 ====
In 1975, fed up with poor attendance in Oakland during the team's championship years, Finley thought of moving yet again. When Seattle filed a lawsuit against Major League Baseball over the move of the Seattle Pilots to Milwaukee, Finley and others came up with an elaborate shuffle which would move the ailing Chicago White Sox to Seattle. Finley then would move the Athletics to Chicago, closer to his home in LaPorte, Indiana; and take the White Sox' place at Comiskey Park. The scheme fell through when White Sox owner John Allyn sold the team to another colorful owner, Bill Veeck, who was not interested in leaving Chicago.

==== 1976 ====
As the 1976 season got underway, the basic rules of player contracts were changing. Seitz had ruled that baseball's reserve clause only bound players for one season after their contract expired. Thus, all players not signed to multi-year contracts would be eligible for free agency at the end of the 1976 season. The balance of power had shifted from the owners to the players for the first time since the days of the Federal League. Like Mack had done twice before, Finley reacted by trading star players and attempting to sell others. On June 15, 1976, Finley sold left fielder Rudi and relief pitcher Fingers to Boston for $1 million each, and pitcher Blue to the New York Yankees for $1.5 million. Three days later, Kuhn voided the transactions in the "best interests of baseball". Amid the turmoil, the Athletics still finished second in the AL West, 2.5 games behind the Royals.

==== 1977 ====
After the 1976 season, most of the Athletics' veteran players did become eligible for free agency, and predictably almost all left. More than 40 years and 3,000 miles (4,800 km) after Connie Mack's last dynasty, one of baseball's most storied franchises suffered yet another dismemberment of a dynasty team. As happened with the end of the Athletics' first dynasty in the early 1900s, the collapse was swift, sudden and total. The next three years were as bad as the worst days in Philadelphia or Kansas City, with the Athletics finishing last twice and next-to-last once. In 1977, for instance—only three years after winning the World Series and two years after playing for the pennant—the Athletics finished with the worst record in the American League, and the second-worst record in baseball. They even trailed the expansion Seattle Mariners (though by only 1/2 game, as one game with the Minnesota Twins was canceled by weather and never made up).

At the end of the 1977 season, Finley attempted to trade Blue to the Reds for a player of lesser stature and cash, but Kuhn vetoed the deal, claiming that it was tantamount to a fire sale similar to the sales he voided a year earlier. He also claimed that adding Blue to the Reds' already formidable pitching staff would make a mockery of the National League West race. Later, Finley sent Doug Bair to the Reds in a deal that Kuhn deemed a true trade. At the same time, Blue was traded across the bay to the San Francisco Giants in a multi-player trade that likewise received the Commissioner's blessing.

==== 1978–1980 ====
Despite Finley's reputation as a master promoter, the Athletics had never drawn well since moving to Oakland, even during the World Series years. In the three years after the veterans from the championship years left, attendance dropped so low that the Coliseum became known as the "Oakland Mausoleum". At one point during the late 1970s, crowds could be counted in the hundreds. The low point came in 1979, when an April 17 game against the Mariners drew an announced crowd of 653. However, Athletics officials claimed the actual attendance was 550, while first baseman Dave Revering thought the crowd was closer to 200. What is beyond dispute is that it was the smallest "crowd" in the West Coast portion of A's history. The Coliseum's upkeep also went downhill. The franchise's rapid deterioration so soon after being the most powerful team in the game led some fans to nickname them "the Triple-A's".

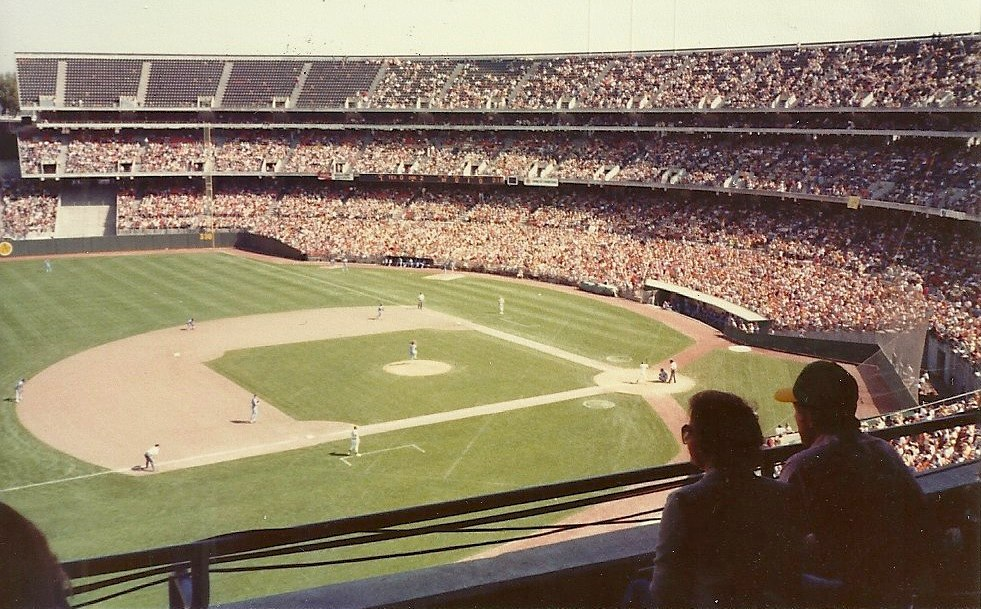
The Oakland Athletics playing host to the Texas Rangers at the Oakland–Alameda County Coliseum during a 1981 home game.

For most of Finley's ownership, the Athletics rarely had radio or television contracts, rendering them all but invisible in the Bay Area even during the World Series era. For the first month of the 1978 season, the Athletics broadcast their games on KALX, a 10-watt college radio station run by the University of California, Berkeley. KALX was practically unlistenable more than 10 miles (16 km) from Oakland. At that time, the Athletics had a radio network stretching all the way to Hawaii, leading one fan to joke, "Honolulu? How about here?" In 1979, the Athletics did not sign a radio contract until the night before opening day. The Athletics near-invisibility prompted Oakland and Alameda County to sue Finley and the Athletics for breach of contract in 1979.

Finley nearly sold the team to buyers who would have moved them to Mile High Stadium in Denver for the 1978 season and the Louisiana Superdome in New Orleans for 1979. Though the American League owners appeared to favor the Denver deal, it fell through when the city of Oakland and Alameda County refused to release the Athletics from their lease. At the time, the Oakland Raiders were threatening to move to Los Angeles, and city and county officials were not willing to lose Oakland's status as a big-league city in its own right. Not surprisingly, only 306,763 paying customers showed up to watch the Athletics in 1979, the team's worst attendance since leaving Philadelphia.

After three dismal seasons on the field and at the gate, the commissioner's office seriously considered selling the team out from under Finley and moving it to New Orleans. Rather than acquiesce, Finley hired Berkeley native Billy Martin to manage the young team, led by new young stars Rickey Henderson, Mike Norris, Tony Armas, and Dwayne Murphy. Martin made believers of his young charges, "Billyball" was used to market the team, and the Athletics finished second in 1980.

However, during that same season Finley's wife sought a divorce, and would not accept a stake in the A's in a property settlement. With most of his money tied up in the A's or his insurance empire, Finley had to sell the team. He agreed in principle to sell to businessman Marvin Davis, who would have moved the Athletics to Denver. However, just before Finley and Davis were due to sign a definitive agreement, the Raiders announced their move to Los Angeles. Oakland and Alameda County officials let it be known that they would not allow any prospective owner to break the Coliseum lease, forcing Davis to call off the deal. Forced to turn to local buyers, Finley sold the A's to San Francisco clothing manufacturer Walter A. Haas, Jr., president of Levi Strauss & Co. prior to the 1981 season. It would not be the last time that the Raiders directly affected the A's future; Denver would eventually get an MLB team in 1993 when the Colorado Rockies began play.

=== Local ownership for the Athletics: the Haas era (1981–1995) ===
Despite winning three World Series and two other AL West Division titles, the Athletics' on-field success did not translate into success at the box office during the Finley era in Oakland. Average home attendance from 1968 to 1980 was 777,000 per season, with 1,075,518 in 1975 being the highest attendance for a Finley-owned team. In marked contrast, during the first year of Haas' ownership, the Athletics drew 1,304,052—in a season shortened by a player strike. Were it not for the strike, the Athletics were on a pace to draw over 2.2 million in 1981. This lent credence to the theory that Bay Area residents stayed away from the Coliseum because they did not want to give their money to Finley.

Haas set about changing the team's image. He ditched Charlie O. as the team mascot and restored the traditional team name of "Athletics" as soon as he closed on the purchase, with the ownership group formally known as "The Oakland Athletics Baseball Company". He also installed pictures of Connie Mack and other greats from the Philadelphia days in the team office; Finley had scarcely acknowledged the team's past. While the team colors remained green, gold, and white, the bright Kelly green was replaced with a more subdued forest green. After a 23-year hiatus, the elephant was restored as the club mascot in 1988. The script "Athletics", which had adorned home and road jerseys from 1954 to 1960, was returned to home jerseys in 1987.

The Haases gave Martin complete control of the baseball operation with the title of "player development director", effectively making him his own general manager. The Athletics lost in the American League Championship Series after winning the "first half" AL West Division title of the strike-interrupted 1981 season. The club finished with the second-best overall record in baseball, and the best record in the American League. Had the season not been split in half, the 1981 Athletics would have gone wire-to-wire. However, an injury-riddled team significantly regressed in 1982, falling to 68–94. Although Martin was not blamed for the debacle, growing concern about his off-field behavior resulted in his firing after the season.

During the 15 years of Haas' ownership, the Athletics became one of baseball's most successful teams at the gate, drawing 2,900,217 in 1990, still the club record for single season attendance, as well as on the field. Average annual home attendance during those years (excluding the strike years of 1981 and 1994) was over 1.9 million.

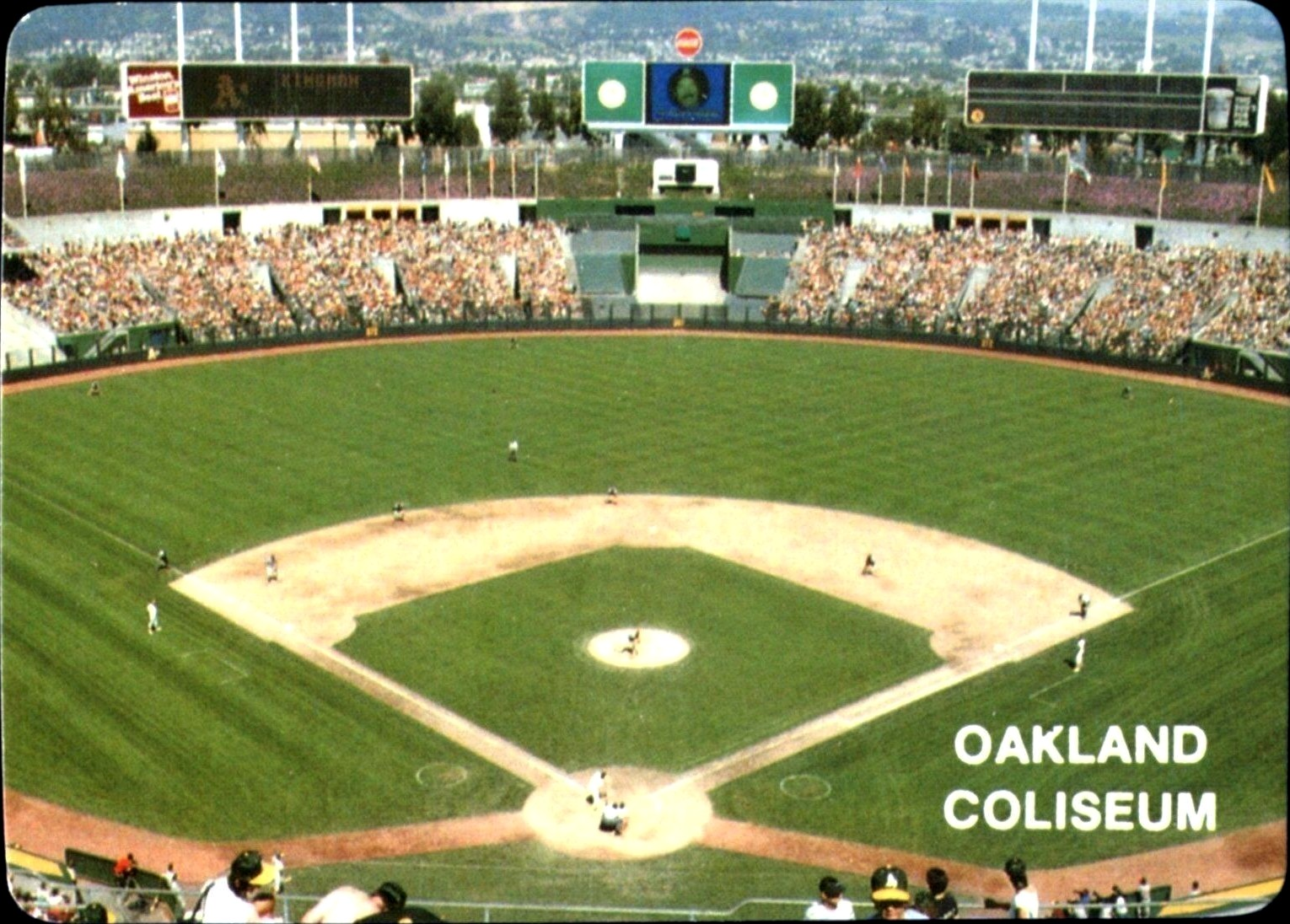
The Athletics hosting a home game in 1985

Under the Haas ownership, the minor league system was rebuilt, which bore fruit later that decade as José Canseco (1986), Mark McGwire (1987), and Walt Weiss (1988) were chosen as AL Rookies of the Year. During the 1986 season, Tony La Russa was hired as the Athletics' manager, a post he held until the end of 1995. In 1987, La Russa's first full year as manager, the team finished at 81–81, its best record in seven seasons. Beginning in 1988, the Athletics won the AL pennant three years in a row. Reminiscent of their Philadelphia predecessors, this Athletics team finished with the best record of any team in the major leagues during all 3 years, winning 104 (1988), 99 (1989), and 103 (1990) games, featuring such stars as McGwire, Canseco, Weiss, Rickey Henderson, Carney Lansford, Dave Stewart, and Dennis Eckersley.

During this time, Rickey Henderson shattered Lou Brock's modern major league record by stealing 130 bases in a single season (1982), a total which has not been approached since. On May 1, 1991, Henderson broke one of baseball's most famous records when he stole the 939th base of his career, one more than Brock.

Regular season dominance led to some success in the post-season. The Athletics' lone World Series championship of the era was a four-game sweep of the cross-bay rival San Francisco Giants in the 1989 World Series. Unfortunately for the Athletics, their sweep of the Giants was overshadowed by the Loma Prieta earthquake that occurred at the start of Game 3 before a national television audience. This forced the remaining games to be delayed for ten days. When play resumed, the atmosphere was dominated more by a sense of relief than celebration by baseball fans. Heavily favored Athletics teams lost the World Series in both 1988, to the Los Angeles Dodgers, and in 1990, to the Cincinnati Reds. The latter was a shocking four-game sweep reminiscent of the Athletics' loss to the Boston Braves 76 years earlier. The team began declining, winning the AL West championship in 1992 (but losing to Toronto in the ALCS), then finishing last in 1993.

=== The "Moneyball" years (1996–2004) ===
Final Oakland A's logo (1993–2024)

In 1995, the Raiders returned to Oakland after spending 12 years in Los Angeles; with this, the Coliseum underwent an $83 million facelift that altered the Coliseum significantly. Walter Haas died in that same year, and the team was sold to San Francisco Bay Area real estate developers Steve Schott (third cousin to one-time Cincinnati Reds' owner Marge Schott), silent partner David Etheridge and Ken Hofmann, prior to the 1996 season. Once again, the Athletics' star players were traded or sold, as the new owners' goal was to cut payroll drastically. Many landed with the St. Louis Cardinals, including McGwire, Eckersley, and manager La Russa. In a turn of events eerily reminiscent of the Athletics' Roger Maris trade 38 years before, Mark McGwire celebrated his first full season with the Cardinals by setting a new major league home run record.

The Schott-Hofmann ownership allocated resources to building and maintaining a strong minor league system while almost always refusing to pay the going rate to keep star players on the team once they become free agents. Perhaps as a result, at the turn of the 21st century, the Athletics were a team that usually finished at or near the top of the AL West Division, but could not advance beyond the first round of the playoffs. The Athletics made the playoffs for four straight years, from 2000 to 2003, but lost their first round (best three-out-of-five) series in each case, 3 games to 2. In two of those years (2001 against the Yankees and 2003 against the Red Sox), the Athletics won the first two games of the series, only to lose the next three straight. In 2001, Oakland became the first team to lose a best-of-five series after winning both of the first two games on the road. In 2004, the Athletics missed the playoffs altogether, losing the final series of the season—and the divisional title—to the Anaheim Angels by one game.

This period in Oakland history featured splendid performances from a trio of young starting pitchers: right-hander Tim Hudson and left-handers Mark Mulder and Barry Zito. Between 1999 and 2006, the so-called "Big Three" helped the Athletics to emerge into a perennial powerhouse in the American League West, combining for a collective record of 261–131. They gave the Athletics a 1–2–3 punch to add to talented infielders and potent hitters, such as first baseman Jason Giambi, shortstop Miguel Tejada, and third baseman Eric Chavez. Giambi was named American League MVP in 2000, and Tejada won an MVP Award of his own in 2002, a year which also saw Zito win 23 games and the Cy Young Award.

On May 29, 2000, Randy Velarde achieved an unassisted triple play against the Yankees. In the sixth, second baseman Velarde caught Shane Spencer's line drive, tagged Jorge Posada running from first to second, and stepped on second before Tino Martinez could return. (Velarde had also pulled off an unassisted triple play during a spring training game that year). This was only the 11th unassisted triple play in the history of Major League Baseball.

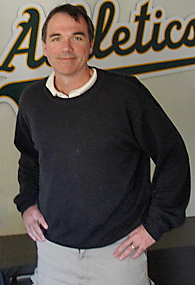
Billy Beane 2006

The general manager of the Athletics, Billy Beane, has become notable due to Michael Lewis's portrayal of Beane's novel approach to business decisions and scouting, referred to as Moneyball, both the title of the book, and hence the school of baseball business management. The Athletics organization began redefining the way that major league baseball teams evaluate player talent. They began filling their system with players who did not possess traditionally valued baseball "tools" of throwing, fielding, hitting, hitting for power and running. Instead, they drafted for unconventional statistical prowess: on-base percentage for hitters (rather than batting average) and strikeout/walk ratios for pitchers (rather than velocity). These undervalued stats came cheaply. With the sixth-lowest payroll in baseball in 2002, the Oakland Athletics won an American League best 103 games. They spent $41 million that season, while the Yankees, who also won 103 games, spent $126 million. The Athletics have continually succeeded at winning, and defying market economics, keeping their payroll near the bottom of the league. For example, after the 2004 season, in which the Athletics placed second in their division, Beane shocked many by breaking up the Big Three, trading Tim Hudson to the Atlanta Braves and Mark Mulder to the St. Louis Cardinals. To many, the trades appeared bizarre, in that the two pitchers were seen to be at or near the top of their game; however, the decision was perfectly in line with Beane's business model as outlined in Moneyball. The Mulder trade, to many experts' surprise, turned into a steal for the Athletics, as little-known starter Dan Haren ended up pitching far better for Oakland than Mulder did for St. Louis.

Also during this time, the Athletics won an American League record 20 games in a row, from August 13 to September 4, 2002. The last three games were won in dramatic fashion, each victory coming in the bottom of the ninth inning. Win number 20 was notable because the Athletics, with Tim Hudson pitching, jumped to an 11–0 lead against the AL-cellar dwelling Kansas City Royals, only to slowly give up 11 unanswered runs to lose the lead. Then, Scott Hatteberg, enduring criticism as Jason Giambi's replacement, hit a pinch-hit home run off Royals closer Jason Grimsley in the bottom of the 9th inning to win 12–11. The streak was snapped two nights later in Minneapolis, the Athletics losing 6–0 to the Minnesota Twins. The Major League record for consecutive games without a loss is 26, set by the NL's New York Giants in 1916. There was a tie game embedded in that streak (ties were not uncommon in the days before stadium lights) and the record for consecutive wins with no ties is 22, held by the Cleveland Indians in 2017.

=== The Wolff era (2005–2016) ===
==== 2005 ====
On March 30, 2005, the Athletics were sold to a group fronted by real estate developer Lewis Wolff, although the majority owner is John J. Fisher, son of The Gap, Inc.'s founder. Wolff, though a Los Angeles businessman, had successfully developed many real estate projects in and around San Jose. The previous ownership had retained Wolff to help them find an adequate parcel on which to construct a new stadium. Because of Wolff's background, rumors that he wanted to move the team to San Jose surfaced periodically upon his purchase of the team. However, any such plans were always complicated by the claims of the cross-bay San Francisco Giants that they own the territorial rights to San Jose and Santa Clara County.

In 2005, many pundits picked the Athletics to finish last as a result of Beane's dismantling of the Big Three. At first, the experts appeared vindicated, as the Athletics were mired in last place on May 31 with a 19–32 (.373) win–loss record. After that the team began to gel, playing at a .622 clip for the remainder of the season, eventually finishing 88–74 (.543), seven games behind the newly renamed Los Angeles Angels of Anaheim and for many weeks seriously contending for the AL West crown.

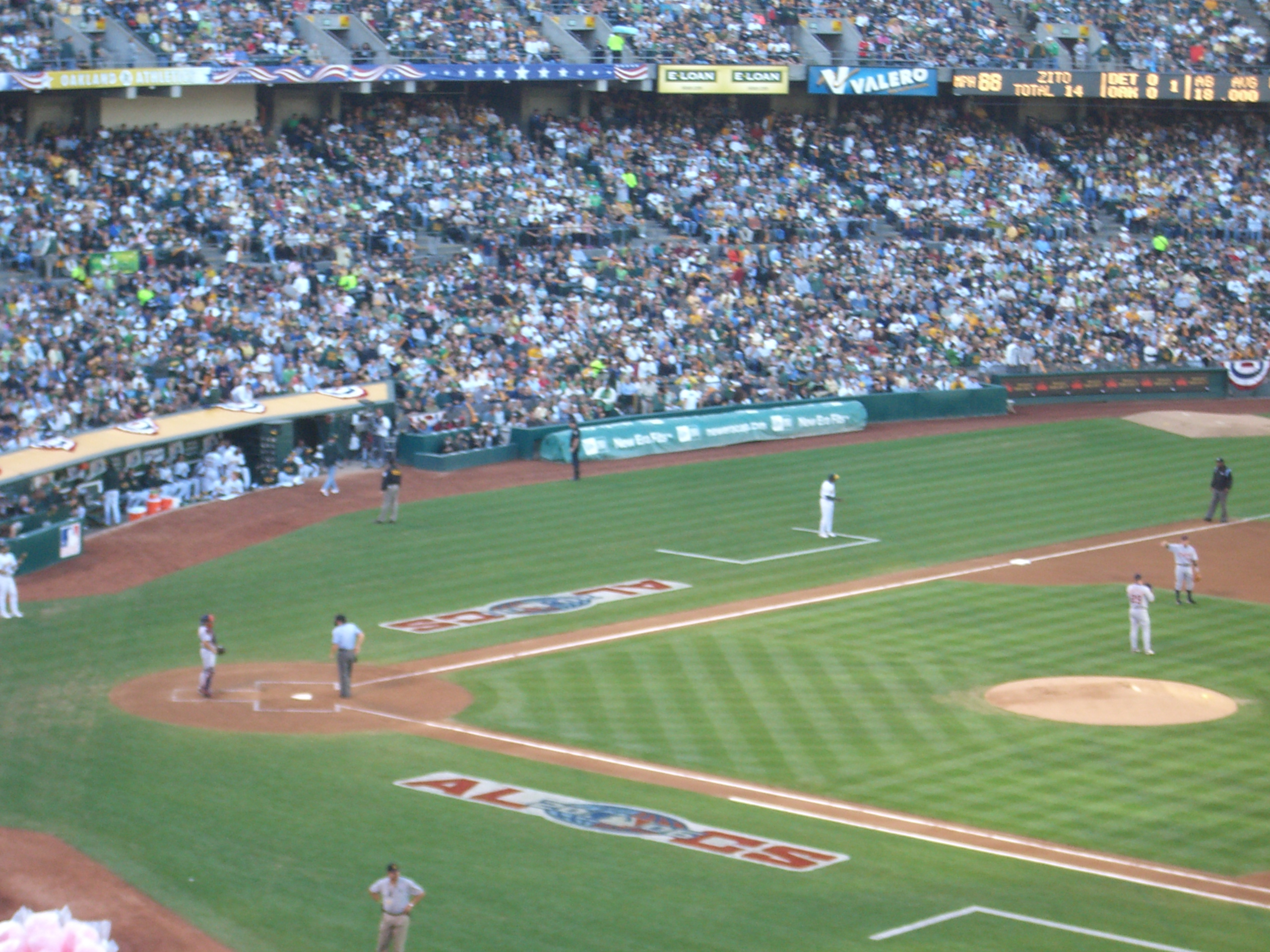
Game 1 of the 2006 ALCS in Oakland, California

Pitcher Huston Street was voted the AL Rookie of the Year in 2005, the second year in a row an Athletic won that award, shortstop Bobby Crosby having won in 2004. For the fifth straight season, third baseman Eric Chavez won the AL Gold Glove Award at that position.

==== 2006 ====
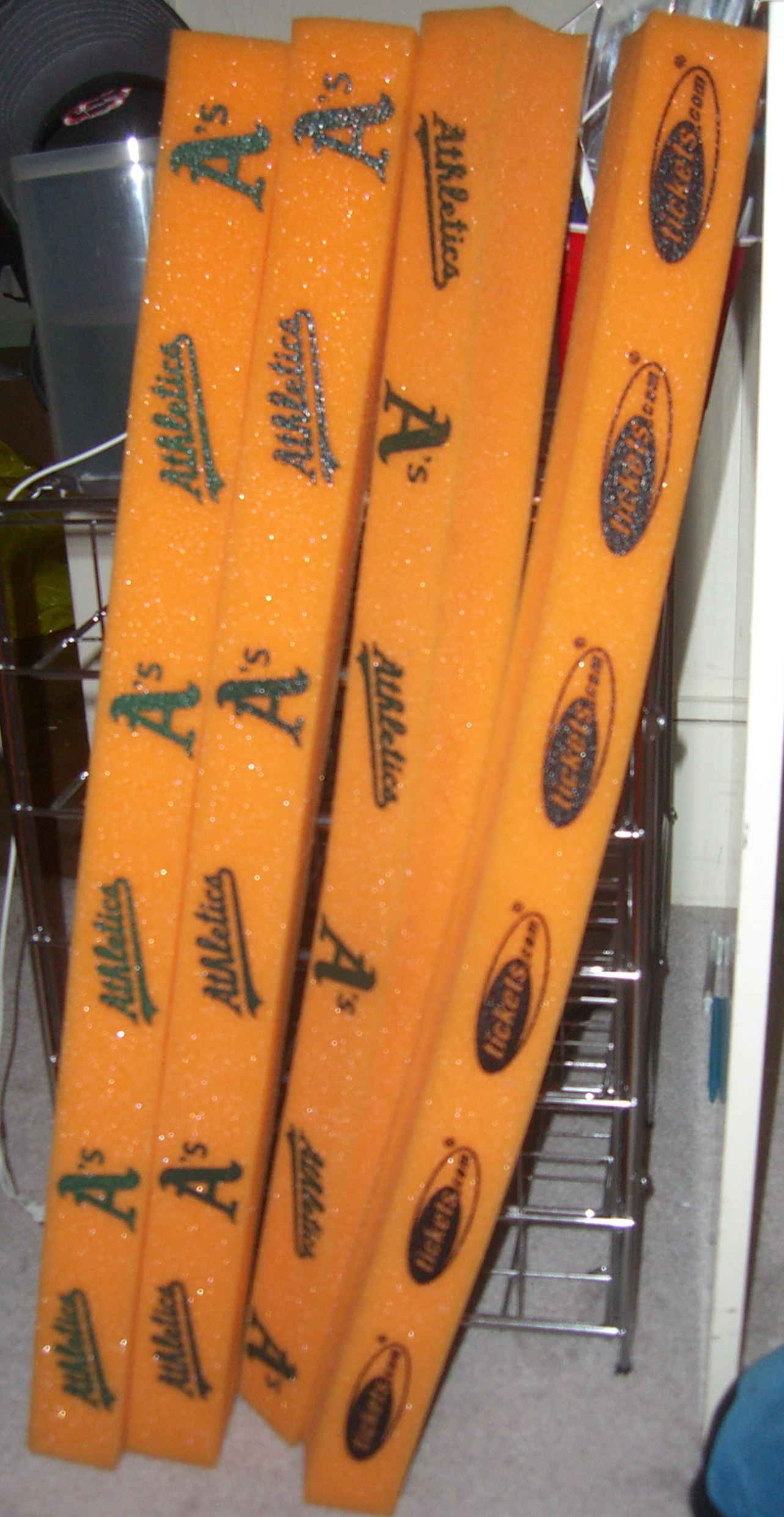
Rally sticks given to fans for Games 1 and 2 of the ALCS in Oakland

The 2006 season brought the Athletics back to the postseason after a three-year absence. After finishing the season at 93–69, four games ahead of the Angels, the Athletics were considered the underdog against the highly favored Minnesota Twins. The Athletics swept the series 3–0 however, despite having to start on the road and losing second baseman Mark Ellis, who sustained a broken finger after getting hit by a pitch in the second game. Their victory was short-lived though, as the Athletics were swept 4–0 by the Detroit Tigers. Manager Ken Macha was fired by Billy Beane on October 16, four days after their loss in the 2006 American League Championship Series. Beane cited a disconnect between him and his players as well as a general unhappiness among the team as the reason for his sudden departure.

Macha was replaced by bench coach and former major league catcher Bob Geren. Following the 2006 season, the Athletics also lost ace Barry Zito to the Giants due to free agency. They also lost their designated hitter and MVP candidate Frank Thomas to free agency but filled his role with Mike Piazza for 2007. Piazza, a lifetime National League player, agreed to become a full-time designated hitter for the first time in his career.

==== 2007 ====
The 2007 season was a disappointing season for the Athletics as they suffered from injuries to several key players Rich Harden, Huston Street, Eric Chavez, and Mike Piazza. For the first time since the 1998 season, the Athletics finished with a losing record.

The Athletics signed international free agent Michael Inoa to the largest bonus in team and international free agent history.

==== 2008 ====
The 2008 off-season started with controversy, as the Athletics traded ace pitcher Dan Haren to the Arizona Diamondbacks for prospects. This would be followed by trades of outfielder Nick Swisher, who was considered to be a fan-favorite, to the Chicago White Sox, and another fan-favorite Mark Kotsay (also outfielder) to the Atlanta Braves. The trades, especially the first two, caused a lot of anger among fans and the media. The Athletics were considered to be a "rebuilding" team and were expected to be among the bottom-feeders of MLB in the 2008 season. However, the Athletics performed well into late May, and even held first place in the AL West for a good amount of time, but a 2–7 road trip in mid-May allowed the Los Angeles Angels of Anaheim to take first place.

On April 24, just weeks after playing against them while on the Blue Jays, Frank Thomas re-signed with the Athletics, having been released by the Jays after a slow start. On July 8, the Athletics were involved in a blockbuster trade, dealing Rich Harden and Chad Gaudin to the Chicago Cubs for Sean Gallagher, Josh Donaldson, Eric Patterson, and Matt Murton. Then on July 17, the Athletics traded Joe Blanton to the Philadelphia Phillies for three minor leaguers. An 18–37 record for the months of July and August (including a 10-game losing streak) dropped the Athletics into third place, where they would finish the season. They ended 2008 with a disappointing 75–86 record.

Several players were acquired in the offseason trades (pitchers Dana Eveland and Greg Smith from the Dan Haren trade, outfielder Ryan Sweeney from the Swisher trade and reliever Joey Devine from the Mark Kotsay trade). Carlos González and Gio González (no relation) from the Haren and Swisher trades, respectively, also performed well for the Triple-A Sacramento River Cats. It is worth pointing out that Haren, Swisher, and Kotsay have all played well in their new teams. Kotsay himself had a game-winning RBI as a pinch-hitter, against his former team on May 16 in Game 1 of an interleague series between the Athletics and Braves.

==== 2009 ====
In the 2009 offseason, the Athletics traded promising young star outfielder Carlos González, closer Huston Street and starting pitcher Greg Smith for Matt Holliday of the Colorado Rockies. On January 6, 2009, Jason Giambi signed a one-year, $4.6 million contract with a 2nd year option. Giambi said he was glad to be back as he put on his old number 16. Also signed were infielders Orlando Cabrera of the Chicago White Sox and Nomar Garciaparra of the Los Angeles Dodgers. The first half of the season the team played relatively poor, but finished the second half strong, yet still posting a losing record. Holliday was dealt to the St. Louis Cardinals for prospects and Giambi was released in August after spending time on the disabled list.

On December 22, 2009, Sports Illustrated named general manager Billy Beane as number 10 on its list of the Top 10 GMs/Executives of the Decade (in all sports).

==== 2010 ====
The offseason was busy from the start. The team dealt the key-player from the Holliday trade, Brett Wallace, to the Toronto Blue Jays for outfielder Michael Taylor. After missing all of the 2009 season, Ben Sheets signed a 1-year deal. The team had a decent spring, posting a better record than other AL West teams. To begin the regular season, the team had 2 walk-off wins.

On May 9, 42 years almost to the day after Catfish Hunter, Athletics pitcher Dallas Braden pitched a perfect game, the 19th in Major League history, in a 4–0 victory over the Tampa Bay Rays at the Coliseum. The next homestand was a week-long celebration of the feat, with a commemorative graphic placed on the outfield wall on May 17.

Oakland finished the 2010 season with an 81–81 record; 2nd in the division, 9 games behind Texas, and 1 game ahead of Los Angeles.

==== 2011 ====
Oakland finished the 2011 season with a 74–88 record; 3rd in the division, 22 games behind Texas. Pitcher Rich Harden returned on a one-year deal. Hideki Matsui was signed as a designated hitter on a one-year deal. Vin Mazarro was traded to the Royals for David DeJesus. Travis Buck, Jack Cust, and Edwin Encarnación were lost to the Indians, Mariners, and Blue Jays (respectively). Encarnacion was later claimed off waivers. Rajai Davis was traded to Toronto for two pitchers. Eric Chavez was lost to the Yankees as a free agent.

==== 2012 ====
After an offseason that saw All Star pitchers Gio González, Trevor Cahill, and Andrew Bailey traded away, the Athletics entered the 2012 season with low expectations. This season was Bob Melvin's first full season as the Athletics manager. During the trading period, the Athletics had traded fan-favorite catcher Kurt Suzuki to the Washington Nationals for cash considerations. The Athletics also traded relief pitcher Fautino de los Santos to the Milwaukee Brewers for catcher George Kottaras. On August 15, veteran starting pitcher Bartolo Colón received a 50-game suspension after testing positive for performing-enhancing drugs. On September 5, veteran pitcher Brandon McCarthy was struck in the head by a line drive off of the bat of Erick Aybar ending his 2012 season. The Athletics entered the last month of the season with an all-rookie starting rotation, but by the end of the month, they had pulled within 2 games of the Texas Rangers for the AL West lead, setting the stage for a season ending, 3-game series that would decide the winner of the 2012 division title. The Athletics swept the series, culminating in 12–5 victory which saw the Athletics come back from a 4-run deficit to clinch the AL West for the first time since 2006. The Athletics ended the regular season with a record of 94–68, leading the Major Leagues in walk-off wins, with 14 in the regular season, and one in Game 4 of the American League Division Series. The Athletics lost the ALDS to the eventual American League Champion Detroit Tigers in 5 games.

Bob Melvin was awarded the 2012 AL Manager of the Year award, and outfielder Josh Reddick was awarded a Gold Glove, becoming the first Athletics outfielder since 1985 to do so. Following the season shortstop Cliff Pennington was traded to the Arizona Diamondbacks for outfielder Chris Young, as part of a 3 team trade.

==== 2013 ====
In 2013, under manager Bob Melvin after going 96–66 and claiming their second straight division title over the heavily favored Texas Rangers and Los Angeles Angels, the Athletics lost Game 5 of the ALDS to Justin Verlander and the Detroit Tigers for the second straight season in their own ballpark. Josh Donaldson had an MVP-caliber season, with a .301 batting average 24 home runs, and 93 RBIs. Despite his age, Bartolo Colón was in contention for a Cy Young Award, going 18–6, with 117 strikeouts and a 2.65 ERA. During the regular season the Athletics saw the additions of former Athletics catcher Kurt Suzuki from the Washington Nationals, Alberto Callaspo from the Los Angeles Angels, and Stephen Vogt off waivers from the Tampa Bay Rays.Grant Balfour broke the Athletics record for most consecutive saves and the Athletics saw the growth of young players like Jed Lowrie, Yoenis Céspedes, Josh Donaldson, and Sonny Gray. The Athletics would finish in the top 3 of the Major League Baseball in home runs and OPS. Even after the devastating loss to the Detroit Tigers, the Athletics retained most of their 2013 roster, only losing Colon and Balfour to free agency.

==== 2014 ====
The Athletics started out as a favorite to win the AL West again, and played up to that, having the best record in baseball at the All-Star break. To bolster their starting rotation, they acquired pitchers Jeff Samardzija and Jason Hammel from the Chicago Cubs for several top prospects on July 4, and later acquired Jon Lester from the Boston Red Sox at the July 31 non-waiver trade deadline for Yoenis Céspedes. However, without the big bat of Cespedes, poor production from All-Stars Josh Donaldson and Brandon Moss, and an injury to closer Sean Doolittle, they struggled in August and the Los Angeles Angels of Anaheim caught up, sweeping them in a key 4-game series between the two teams. At the August 31 waiver trade deadline, the Athletics acquired first baseman Adam Dunn from the Chicago White Sox and cash considerations for a minor league player. Despite their struggles which continued into September, they made the playoffs on the last day of the season, and faced the Kansas City Royals in the Wild Card Game. While they carried a 7–3 lead going into the bottom of the 8th inning, they managed to relinquish it due to the Royals' baserunning skills coupled with ineffective pitching, allowing them to tie the game. They did regain the lead in the top of the 12th, but the Royals responded with 2 runs in the bottom of the inning, winning on a walk-off single by Salvador Pérez.

==== 2015 ====
In the off-season the Athletics started to rebuild with trading Josh Donaldson, Jeff Samardzija, Brandon Moss, and losing Jon Lester to free agency.

The Athletics ended 2015 with a disappointing 68–94 record that put them in last place in the AL West. This despite Sonny Gray emerging as an ace of the staff with a 2.73 ERA and 14 wins in 31 starts. Nevertheless, the team brought in future key pieces in Marcus Semien, Mark Canha and Chris Bassitt, all of whom would become integral to the Athletics' success later in the decade.

=== The John J. Fisher years (2016–present) ===
==== 2016 ====
Like in 2015, the Athletics were in last place with a 69–93 record, despite a breakout season from newcomer Khris Davis, whose 42 home runs began a three-year stretch of 40 home run seasons. New arrivals in Sean Manaea and Liam Hendriks later became key pieces on the pitching staff moving forward. In November 2016, after the season ended, Wolff sold his 10% stake in the team to John J. Fisher, who became the full owner of the team; Wolff is now the chairman emeritus.

==== 2017 ====
For the third straight year, the Athletics were in last place with a 75–87 record. The Athletics traded away ace Sonny Gray to the New York Yankees midway through the season, but brought in struggling reliever Blake Treinen from the Washington Nationals. In addition, Matt Chapman was called up as the third baseman of the future.

The team won 10 of their last 14 games, and rookie Matt Olson hit 24 home runs in just 189 at bats, finishing 4th in AL Rookie of the Year voting.

==== 2018 ====
On April 21, Sean Manaea threw the Athletics franchise's 12th no-hitter, and their first since Dallas Braden in 2010.

The Athletics surprised the American League by winning 97 games, and earned a trip to the postseason as a wild card team. Bob Melvin became the American League Manager of the Year for the third time in his coaching career.

==== 2019 ====
On May 7 versus the Cincinnati Reds at the RingCentral Coliseum, Mike Fiers threw the Athletics franchise's 13th no-hitter. It was the second no-hitter of his career, and the 300th no-hitter in MLB history. To bolster the pitching rotation, on July 14, the Athletics acquired right-handed pitcher Homer Bailey from the Kansas City Royals in exchange for shortstop Kevin Merrell. On July 27, to improve on their lack-luster bullpen, the Athletics acquired left-handed pitcher Jake Diekman for outfielder Dairon Blanco and right-handed pitcher Ismael Aquino. For the second consecutive season, the Athletics won 97 games and a playoff berth, earning the right to host the Tampa Bay Rays in the American League Wild Card game at Oakland Coliseum on October 2, 2019. The Athletics were 52–27 at home on the season.

==== 2020 ====
The Athletics finished with a 36–24 record in the shortened 2020 Major League Baseball season. The Athletics beat the Chicago White Sox two games to one in the first round of the expanded MLB postseason to face the Houston Astros. The Athletics lost to the Astros three games to one in the Division Series.

==== 2021 ====
In 2021, the Athletics finished third the AL West with an 86–76 record, missing the playoffs for the first time since 2017. Following the season, longtime manager Bob Melvin left the organization to become the manager of the San Diego Padres.

On May 11, 2021, Major League Baseball granted the Athletics permission to explore relocation, saying that the Oakland Coliseum "is not a viable option for the future vision of baseball".

==== 2022 ====
Prior to the 2022 season, the Athletics traded several key players away or let them leave during free agency. These players included Olson, Chapman, Bassitt, Manaea, Canha, and Starling Marte. Because the team's future in Oakland began looking more uncertain, some observers suspected that the organization was tanking with the hopes of fielding a competitive team in a new city.

The Athletics wound up having a disastrous 2022 season in which the team finished last in the AL West with a 60–102 record. It was the worst record in the American League and Oakland's worst record since 1979.

=== Final years in Oakland ===
==== 2023 ====
In April 2023, the Athletics finalized plans to relocate to Las Vegas, purchasing a 49-acre plot on the site of the Wild Wild West Gambling Hall & Hotel near the Las Vegas Strip for the construction of a new ballpark, ending negotiations with the city of Oakland. On May 9, 2023, the Athletics switched their planned location to the site of Tropicana Las Vegas, which was demolished to make room for a 33,000-seat retractable roof stadium. By June 2023, the team's 33,000-seat ballpark was approved through the Nevada Legislature voting in favor of its bill SB1 and sent to the desk of Governor Joe Lombardo where he would sign it into law. After SB1's signing, the Athletics announced the relocation process to the Las Vegas area would begin with the team drafting an application for the move by June 21. The team would submit its relocation application fully on August 21. The Athletics finished the 2023 season with a 50–112 record, the worst in the major leagues.

==== 2024 ====
On November 16, 2023, the Athletics received official approval from MLB to relocate to Las Vegas. By April, the team officially announced that 2024 would be its final season in Oakland and would spend three seasons at West Sacramento's Sutter Health Park until their new ballpark in Las Vegas is complete. The Athletics played their final game at both the Coliseum and in Oakland on September 26, 2024, winning 3–2 against the Texas Rangers in front of 46,889 fans. The Athletics finished 69–93 that season, fourth in the AL West. On March 30, 2025, the Athletics played their final game as an Oakland-based team, losing 1–2 against the Seattle Mariners on the road.

On May 13, 2024, in a game between the Houston Astros and the Athletics, Jenny Cavnar and Julia Morales became the first two women to do the play-by-play on television for the same Major League Baseball game.

== Sacramento (2025–present) ==
=== 2025 ===
The 2025 season was the first season for the Athletics at Sutter Health Park in West Sacramento, California, the home of the Sacramento River Cats. During their time in Sacramento, the Athletics will not use a geographic identifier.

On July 25, 2025, first baseman Nick Kurtz hit four home runs in a game against the Houston Astros, becoming the first rookie and first Athletics player to achieve the feat. With 19 total bases, Kurtz also tied the MLB single-game record set by Shawn Green in 2002.

The Athletics finished the 2025 season with a 76–86 record, placing fourth in the Amearican League West. Kurtz was unanimously named the American League Rookie of the Year.
