= Philadelphia Athletics =

Historical Major League Baseball (MLB) team (1901–1954)

Logo	Cap insignia

Information
- League: American League (1901–1954)
- Established: 1901; 125 years ago
- Relocated: 1955; 71 years ago (to Kansas City, Missouri; became the Kansas City Athletics)
- World Series championships: 5: 1910; 1911; 1913; 1929; 1930
- American League pennant: 9: 1902; 1905; 1910; 1911; 1913; 1914; 1929; 1930; 1931
- Former ballparks: Shibe Park (1909–1954); Columbia Park (1901–1908)
- Colors: Royal blue, white, red
- Retired numbers: None
- Ownership: List of owners: Sam Jones (1901–1912); Frank Hough (1901–1912); Benjamin Shibe (1901–1922); Tom Shibe (1901–1935); John Shibe (1901–1937); Connie Mack (1901–1954); Earle Mack (1950–1954); Roy Mack (1950–1954)
- General manager: List of general managers: Connie Mack (1901–1950, de facto); Mickey Cochrane (1950); Arthur Ehlers (1950–1953); Earle Mack (1954, de facto)
- Manager: List of managers: Connie Mack (1901–1950); Earle Mack (1937, 1939); Jimmy Dykes (1951–1953); Eddie Joost (1954)

The Philadelphia Athletics were a Major League Baseball team that played in Philadelphia from 1901 to 1954, when they moved to Kansas City, Missouri, and became the Kansas City Athletics. After another move to Oakland, California, in 1967, they became the Oakland Athletics. In 2025, the team moved to West Sacramento, California, as the Athletics, and plans ultimately to move to the Las Vegas metropolitan area.

The Philadelphia Athletics had an overall win–loss record of 3,886–4,248–79 (.478) during their 54 years in Philadelphia. Eight former Philadelphia Athletics players were elected to the National Baseball Hall of Fame.

== History ==
=== Beginning ===
Philadelphia Athletics primary logo 1902–1921.

The Western League was renamed the American League in 1900 by league president Bancroft (Ban) Johnson and declared itself the second major league in 1901. Johnson created new franchises in the east and eliminated some franchises in the west. Philadelphia was given a new franchise to compete with the National League's Philadelphia Phillies.

Former catcher Connie Mack was recruited to manage the club. Mack in turn persuaded Phillies minority owner Ben Shibe as well as others to invest in the team, which would be called the Philadelphia Athletics, a name taken from the Athletic Base Ball Club of Philadelphia, which had been a founding member of the NL in 1876 but had folded after only one season. Mack himself bought a 25% interest, while the remaining 25% was sold to Philadelphia sportswriters Sam Jones and Frank Hough.

The new league recruited many of its players from the existing National League, persuading them to "jump" to the American League in defiance of their contracts. One of the players who jumped to the new league was second baseman Nap Lajoie, formerly of the crosstown Phillies. He won the A.L.'s first batting title with a .426 batting average, still a league record. The Athletics and the American League received a setback when, on April 21, 1902, the Pennsylvania Supreme Court invalidated Lajoie's contract with the Athletics, and ordered him back to the Phillies. This order, though, was only enforceable in the Commonwealth of Pennsylvania. Lajoie was sold to Cleveland, but was kept out of road games in Philadelphia until the National Agreement was signed between the two leagues in 1903.

Columbia Park was the Athletics first home. They played there from their founding in 1901 through the 1908 season, and it was the venue of their two home games in the 1905 World Series.

=== First dynasty and aftermath ===
In the early years, the Athletics established themselves as one of the dominant teams in the new league, winning the A.L. pennant six times (1902, 1905, 1910, 1911, 1913, and 1914), and winning the World Series in 1910, 1911, and 1913. They won over 100 games in 1910 and 1911, and 99 games in 1914. The team was known for its "$100,000 infield," consisting of Stuffy McInnis (first base), Eddie Collins (second base), Jack Barry (shortstop), and Frank "Home Run" Baker (third base) as well as pitchers Eddie Plank and Chief Bender. Rube Waddell was also a major pitching star for the Athletics in the early 1900s. According to Lamont Buchanan in The World Series and Highlights of Baseball, the Athletics fans were fond of chanting, "If Eddie Plank doesn't make you lose / We have Waddell and Bender all ready to use!" Plank holds the franchise record for career victories, with 284.

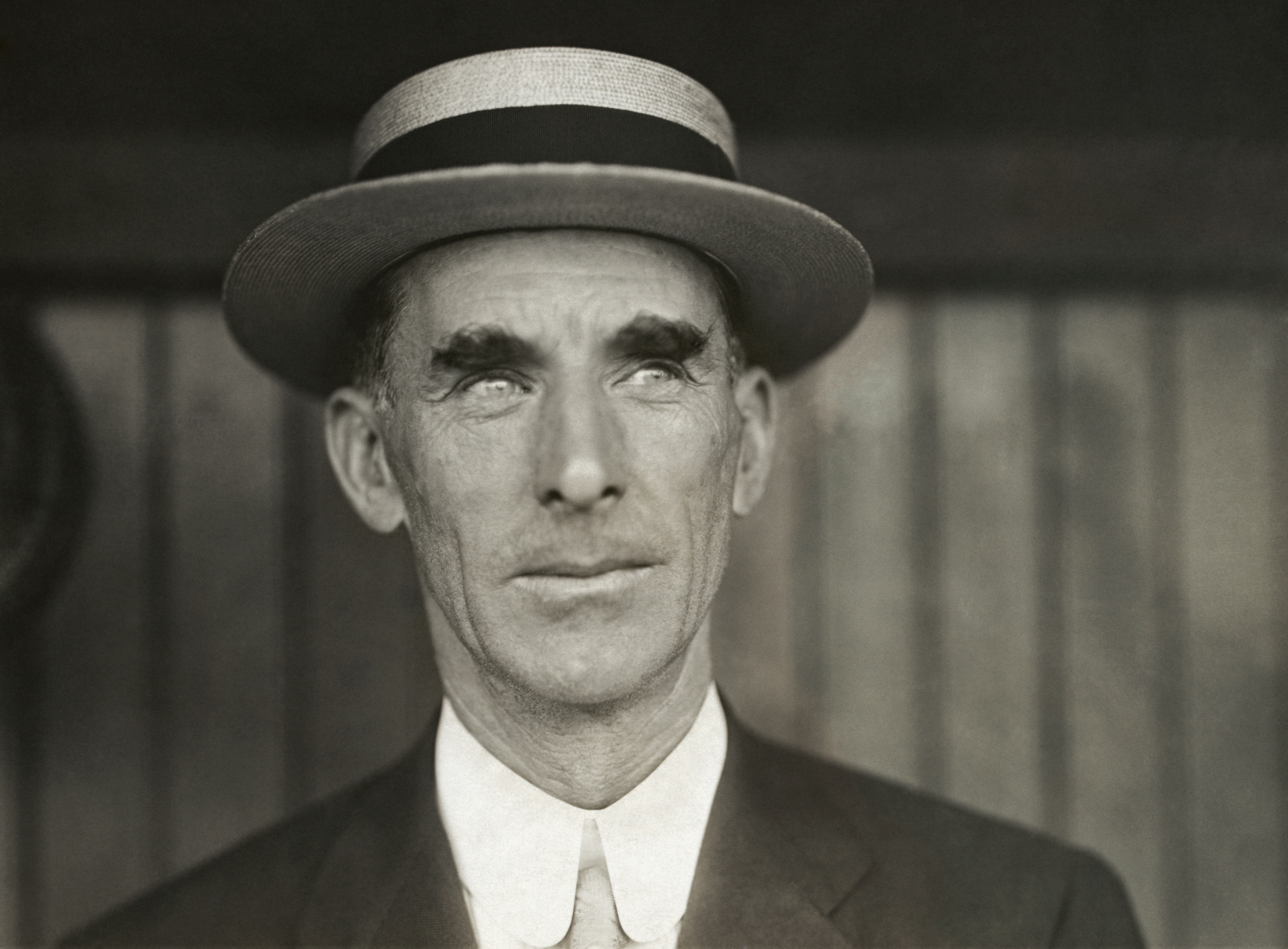
Longtime manager Connie Mack, pictured in 1911

In 1909, the Athletics moved into the major leagues' first concrete-and-steel ballpark, Shibe Park. This remains the second and last time in franchise history where a new ballpark was built specifically for the Athletics. In 1912, Mack bought the 25% of the team's stock owned by Jones and Hough to become a full partner with Shibe. Shibe ceded Mack full control over the baseball side while retaining control over the business side. However, Mack had already enjoyed a nearly free hand in baseball matters since the franchise's inception.

In 1914, the Athletics lost the 1914 World Series to the "Miracle Braves" in a four-game sweep. Mack traded, sold or released most of the team's star players soon after. In his book To Every Thing a Season, Bruce Kuklick points out that there were suspicions that the Athletics had thrown the Series, or at least "laid down," perhaps in protest of Mack's frugal ways. Mack himself alluded to that rumor years later, but debunked it. He claimed that the team was torn by numerous internal factions, and was also distracted by the allure of a third major league, the Federal League.

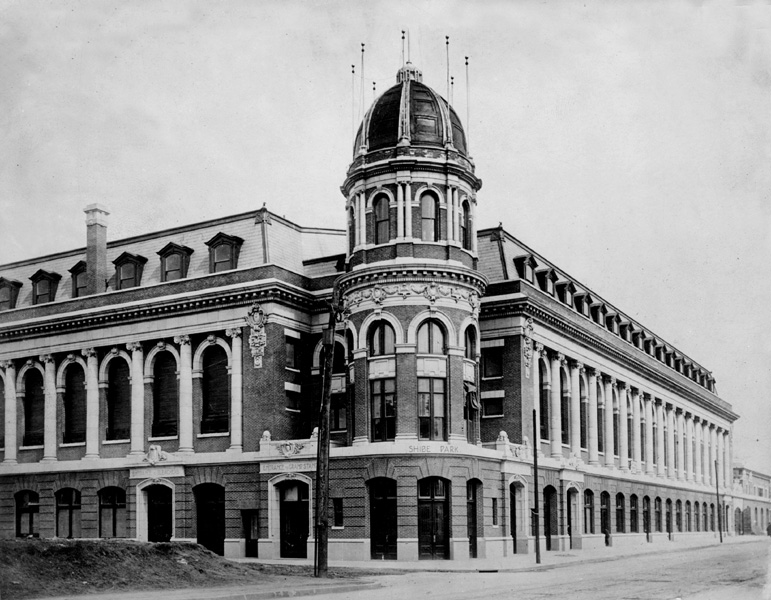
The signature tower and cupola entrance to Shibe Park, 1909

The Federal League had been formed to begin play in 1914. As the AL had done 13 years before, the new league raided existing AL and NL teams for players. Several of his best players, including Bender, had already decided to jump before the World Series. Mack refused to match the upstart league's offers, preferring to rebuild with younger (and less expensive) players. The result was a swift and near-total collapse. The Athletics went from a 99–53 (.651) record and a pennant in 1914 to a record of 43–109 (.283) and last place in 1915, and then to 36–117 (.235, still a modern major-league low) in 1916. The team would finish in last place every year through 1922 and would not contend again until 1925. Shibe died in 1922, and his sons Tom and John took over the business side, leaving the baseball side to Mack. Although Mack only held the titles of vice president and secretary-treasurer, for all intents and purposes he was now the head of the franchise and would remain so for the next three decades.

By this time, Mack had established his image of the tall, gaunt and well-dressed man waving his players into position with a scorecard. Unlike most managers, he chose to wear a high-collar shirt, tie, ascot scarf, and a straw boater hat instead of a uniform, a look that he never changed for the rest of his life, even decades after it went out of fashion. This came at the price of Mack not being allowed on-field during games per league regulations.

=== Second dynasty (1927–1933) ===
By the latter half of the 1920s, Mack had assembled one of the most feared batting orders in the history of baseball, featuring three future Baseball Hall of Fame members. At its heart were Al Simmons, who batted .334 and hit 307 home runs over his major league career, Jimmie Foxx, who hit 30 or more home runs in 12 consecutive seasons and drove in more than 100 runs in 13 consecutive years, and Mickey Cochrane, one of the best-hitting catchers in baseball history. A fourth future Hall of Fame member was pitcher Lefty Grove, who led the American League in strikeouts seven years in a row, and had the league's lowest earned run average a record nine times.

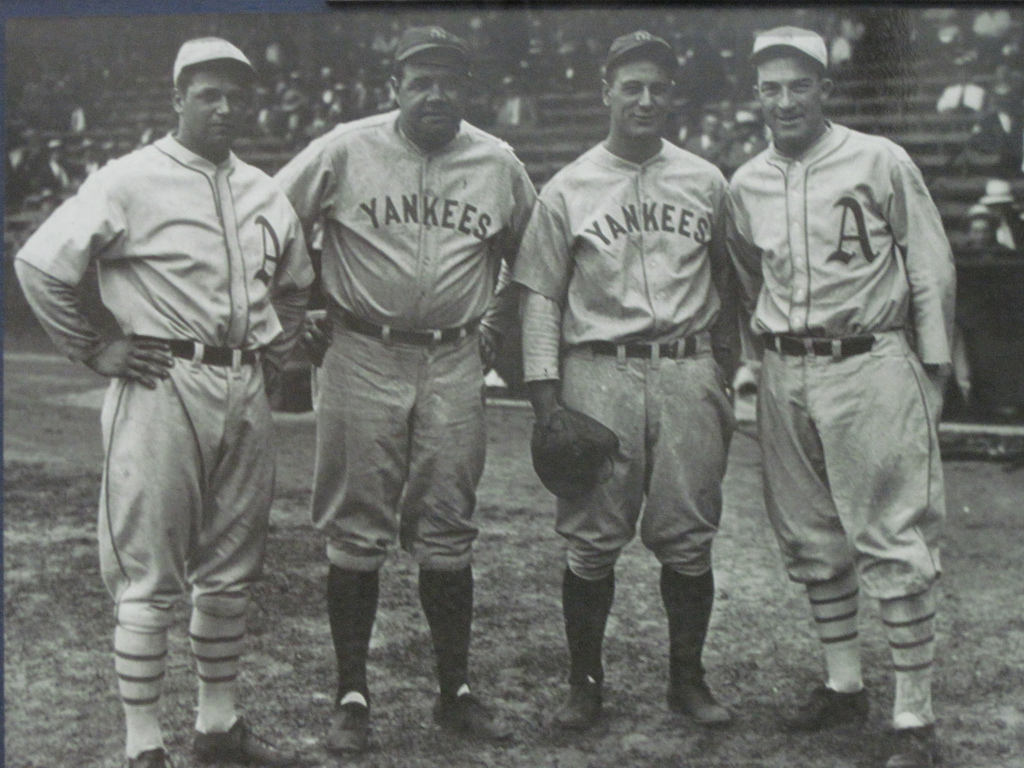
Jimmie Foxx, Babe Ruth, Lou Gehrig and Al Simmons

In 1927 and 1928, the Athletics finished second to the New York Yankees, then won pennants in 1929, 1930 and 1931, winning the World Series in 1929 and 1930. In each of the three years, the Athletics won over 100 games. While the 1927 New York Yankees, whose batting order was known as the Murderers' Row, are remembered as one of the best teams in baseball history, the Athletics teams of the late 1920s and early 1930s are largely forgotten. Opponents who faced both teams considered them to be generally equal. Both teams won three consecutive pennants and two of three World Series.

Statistically the New York and Philadelphia dynasties were remarkably even: The Athletics had a record of 313–143 (.686) between 1929 and 1931; the Yankees, 302–160 (.654) between 1926 and 1928. And while the Athletics scored six fewer runs than the Yankees (2,710–2,716), the Athletics had five fewer runs scored against them (1,992–1,997), a combined difference of only one run. The Yankees had the best single season at the plate, hitting for a combined .307 batting average and scoring 975 runs in 1927. The Athletics' strongest offensive performance came in 1929, when they batted .296. On defense the Athletics were clearly superior; over their three-year American League reign they committed only 432 errors, 167 fewer than the Yankees. Cochrane was also especially adept at telling his pitchers how to pitch to opposing batters. Many veteran baseball observers believe that the Yankees' far more exalted status in history is due largely to the fact that they played in New York, where most of the national media is located.

As it turned out, this would be the Athletics' last hurrah in Philadelphia. The Great Depression was well under way, and declining attendance drastically reduced the team's revenues. Mack again sold or traded his best players in order to reduce expenses. In September 1932, he sold Simmons, Jimmy Dykes and Mule Haas to the Chicago White Sox for $100,000. In December 1933, Mack sent Grove, Rube Walberg and Max Bishop to the Boston Red Sox for Bob Kline, Rabbit Warstler and $125,000. Also in 1933, he sold Cochrane to the Detroit Tigers for $100,000. The construction of a spite fence at Shibe Park, blocking the view from nearby buildings, only served to irritate potential paying fans. However, the consequences did not become apparent for a few more years, as the team finished second in 1932 and third in 1933.

=== Lean years ===
Mack was already 68 years old when the Athletics won the pennant in 1931, and many felt that the game had long since passed him by. Although he had every intention of building another winner, he did not have the extra money to get big stars. He also did not (or could not) invest in a farm system. Unlike most other owners, Mack had no source of income apart from the Athletics, so the dwindling attendance figures of the early 1930s hit him especially hard.

As a result, the Athletics went into a decline that lasted for over 30 years, through three cities. The Athletics finished fifth in 1934, then last in 1935. Except for a fifth-place finish in 1944, they finished in last or next-to-last place every year through 1946. Tom Shibe died in 1936 and John succeeded him as club president. However, John resigned due to illness a few months later, leaving the presidency to Mack. When John died on July 11, 1937, Mack bought enough shares from the Shibe estate to become majority owner. However, Mack had been the franchise's number-one man since Ben Shibe's death. Even as bad as the Athletics got during this time, Mack retained full authority over business and baseball matters. Long after most teams hired a general manager, Mack continued making all personnel decisions and leading the team on the field. One of the few times that he even considered ceding some of his duties came in the 1934–35 offseason, when the Athletics were not far removed from what would be their last great era. He seriously entertained hiring Babe Ruth to succeed him as manager, but backed off from this idea, saying that the Babe's wife, Claire, would be running the team within a month. Even when the Phillies moved to Shibe Park as tenants of the Athletics midway through the 1938 season, not enough revenue came in for Mack to build another winner.

By the mid-1940s, as Mack passed his 80th birthday, he was showing unmistakable signs of mental deterioration, almost to the point of senility. He would frequently sleep through innings, make bad calls that his coaches simply ignored, have inexplicable fits of anger, or call players from decades earlier to pinch-hit. Mack also never installed a telephone in the dugout and instead would use a series of obtuse hand signs to signal his coaches on the field. According to infielder Ferris Fain, "He'd fall asleep for much of the game waving his score card, but he still had a few working nerve endings left in his big ol' neck waddle. Anyone who dared wake him up was subjected to a hasty trial by the team's kangaroo court." For the most part, Mack's coaches handled in-game operations. Nonetheless, despite calls inside and outside the organization to step down, Mack would not even consider firing himself. Also during this time, Mack gave minority stakes in the team to his sons, Roy, Earle and Connie Jr. Although Connie Jr. was nearly 20 years younger than Roy and Earle (he was the son of Connie Sr.'s second marriage), Mack intended to have all three of them inherit the team upon his death. He also intended for Earle, who had been assistant manager since 1924, to succeed him as manager. This decision would have dire consequences for the Athletics later on.

During this time, Shibe Park was also becoming an increasing liability. While the facility had been state of the art when it opened in 1909, by the late 1940s, it had not been well maintained in some time. It was also not suited to automobile traffic, having been designed before the Ford Model T was introduced.

=== Final years ===
To the surprise of most people in baseball, Mack managed not only to get out of the cellar in 1947, but actually finished with a winning record for the first time in 14 years. They contended for much of 1948, even managing to spend 49 days in first place. However, the turning point came on June 13, when pitcher Nels Potter, who had been a solid middle reliever for most of the season, blew a three-run lead in the first game of a doubleheader against the St. Louis Browns. An enraged Mack ordered him off the team in front of a shocked clubhouse after the game. The Athletics spent most of the summer in either first or second place. Mack had previously released pitcher Bill Dietrich and his dismissal of Potter left the second place Athletics with only five healthy pitchers at that point. By the end of the year the team faded to fourth place. The franchise would not be a factor in a pennant race again at that late date until 1969—their second year in Oakland.

Another winning record in 1949 sparked hopes that 1950—the 50th season for both the American League and Mack's tenure as manager of the Athletics—would bring a pennant at last. During that year, the team wore uniforms trimmed in blue and gold, in honor of the Golden Jubilee of "The Grand Old Man of Baseball." However, the 1950 season was an unmitigated disaster. They were only above .500 once all season (at 3–2), and a 5–17 May ended any hope of contention. Before May was out, Mack's sons had agreed to ease their father out as manager. On May 26, it was announced that Mack would resign at the end of the season. On the same day, former Athletics star Jimmy Dykes, who had returned to the Athletics as a coach a year earlier, was named assistant manager and would transition to manager for the 1951 season. However, for all practical purposes, Dykes took over as manager immediately; he was given control over the Athletics' day-to-day operations and became the team's main game-day operator. Cochrane, who had been brought back as a coach earlier in the year, was named general manager, stripping Connie Sr. of his last direct authority over baseball matters. Ultimately, the Athletics finished with the worst record in the majors at 52–102, 46 games out of first. Mack's 50-year tenure is a North American professional sports record for manager/head coach that has never been threatened.

Unfortunately for the Athletics, the team continued to slide on the field. Although the 1949 team set a major league record for double plays which still stands, this was more a reflection of the team's poor pitching staff allowing too many base runners. They would have only one winning record from 1951 to 1954—a fourth-place finish in 1952. The nadir came in 1954, when the Athletics finished with a ghastly 51–103 record, easily the worst record in baseball and 60 games out of first.

At the same time, the Phillies, who had been the definition of baseball futility for over 30 years, began a surprisingly quick climb to respectability. The Athletics were the more popular team in Philadelphia for most of the first half of the century, even though for much of the last decade they had been as bad or worse than the Phillies. But in the 1940s, the Phillies began spending lavishly on young prospects. The impact was immediate. In 1947, the Athletics finished fourth in the American League while the Phillies tied for the worst record in the National League. Just three years later, the Athletics compiled the worst record in the majors and the Phillies went all the way to the 1950 World Series. It soon became obvious that the Phillies had passed the Athletics as Philadelphia's number-one team.

=== Selling the team ===
In the late 1940s, a power struggle developed between Roy and Earle on one side and Connie Jr. on the other. Connie Jr., like many Athletics fans, had become disenchanted with his brothers' bargain-basement approach to running the team. However, Roy and Earle were not willing to modernize and refused to listen to their younger half-brother, whom they considered a mere child with no relevant opinion. Compounding their disagreements was that they had different mothers. When it was apparent that Roy and Earle would not consider making what he considered to be critical reforms, Connie Jr. and his mother (who was angered at Connie Sr.'s refusal to give Connie Jr.'s sisters any role in the team) made an alliance with the Shibe heirs. Connie Jr. began taking steps to upgrade the team and the park. One of the few things on which the two sides agreed was that it was time for Connie Sr. to step down as manager.

Matters came to a head in July 1950, when Connie Jr. and the Shibes decided to sell the team. However, Roy and Earle insisted that they have a 30-day option to buy out Connie Jr. and the Shibes before the team was put on the market. Connie Jr. did not think Roy and Earle could get the $1.74 million required to buy him out, but Roy and Earle called their bluff by mortgaging the team to Connecticut General Life Insurance Company (now part of CIGNA) and pledging Shibe Park as collateral. The mortgage deal closed on August 26. The shares of Connie Jr. and the Shibes were retired, ending the Shibes' half-century involvement with the Athletics and making Connie Sr., Roy and Earle the team's only shareholders. Although his father remained nominal owner and team president, Roy, who had been vice president since 1936, now became operating head of the franchise, sharing day-to-day control with Earle. However, under the terms of the mortgage, the Athletics were now saddled with payments of $200,000 over the first five years, depriving them of badly needed capital that could have been used improving the team and the park. Throughout the early 1950s, attendance plummeted, and there was nowhere near enough revenue to service the mortgage debt.

In response, Roy and Earle began cutting costs even further. They turned over the rent from the Phillies to Connecticut General and took cash advances from their concessions contractor. The cost-cutting ramped up even further in the 1953–54 offseason, when they slashed over $100,000 from the player payroll, fired general manager Arthur Ehlers and replaced Dykes as manager with shortstop Eddie Joost. They also pared down the minor-league system to only six clubs. However, even with these measures, there still wasn't nearly enough money coming in to service the mortgage debt, and Roy and Earle began feuding with each other.

Philadelphia Athletics cap logo, 1951–1953.

Despite the turmoil, some Athletics players shined on the field. In 1951, Gus Zernial led the American League with 33 home runs, 129 runs scored, 68 extra-base hits, and 17 outfield assists; in 1952 he swatted 29 homers and bagged 100 RBI; in 1953 he hit 42 homers and drove in 108 runs. In 1952, left-handed pitcher Bobby Shantz won 24 games and was named the league's Most Valuable Player, and Ferris Fain won AL batting championships in 1951 (with a .344 average) and 1952 (with a .320 average). His 1952 batting crown remains the last time an Athletic has led the league in hitting. Joost was a solid fielder who had a good eye at the plate for generating walks and had an above-average on-base percentage as a result. All four players represented the American League in the All-Star Game. Shantz might have won 30 games his best year 1952 but was hurt by a pitched ball on the wrist and was finished for the season.

==== Moving the team ====
By the summer of 1954, it was obvious that the Athletics were on an irreversible slide into bankruptcy. Earle and Roy decided that there was no choice but to sell their father's beloved team, and it was with great sorrow that the old man gave his approval for the sale. Although several offers were put forward by Philadelphia interests, American League president Will Harridge was convinced that the team could never be viable in Philadelphia. The sparse crowds at Shibe had been a source of frustration for some time to the other AL owners, as they could not even begin to meet their expenses for trips to Philadelphia. As a result, Harridge had come to believe that the only way to resolve the "Philadelphia problem" was to move the Athletics elsewhere. For this reason, when Chicago businessman Arnold Johnson offered to buy the team, the other owners pressured Roy Mack to agree to the sale. Johnson had very close ties to the Yankees; he not only owned Yankee Stadium but also owned Blues Stadium in Kansas City, home to the Yankees' top farm team. Johnson intended to move the Athletics to a renovated Blues Stadium if he was cleared to buy them. The Yankees made no secret that they favored Johnson, and their backing gave him the upper hand with the other owners. After an October 12 owners meeting at which several offers from Philadelphia interests were rejected as inadequate (Harridge later said that while several of them "talked about millions," they didn't have any money behind them), Mack agreed in principle to sell the Athletics to Johnson no later than October 18.

However, on October 17, Roy Mack suddenly announced that the Athletics had been sold to a Philadelphia-based group headed by auto dealer John Crisconi, with Roy having an option to buy a minority stake. The deal was to be approved at an American League owners' meeting on October 28. It looked headed for approval when rumors (reportedly planted by the Yankees) cropped up that the Crisconi group was underfinanced, and Johnson collared Roy Mack at Roy's home to persuade him that his original deal was better for his family in the long run. On October 28, the sale to the Crisconi group came up one vote short of the five needed for approval, with Roy Mack voting against the deal he had just negotiated. While Connie and Earle had joined Roy in signing the contract to sell their stakes to Crisconi, the league's rejection voided the deal.

A day later, Connie Mack released an open letter to Athletics fans (one that was likely written by his wife) blasting the owners and Roy for sinking the deal to the Crisconi group. However, he conceded that he didn't have enough money to run the Athletics in 1955, and the Johnson deal was the only one that had any prospect of winning league approval. A few days later, the Macks sold the Athletics to Johnson for $3.5 million, $1.5 million for their shares plus $2 million in debt. Selling Shibe Park—which had been renamed Connie Mack Stadium a year earlier—proved more difficult, but the Phillies reluctantly bought it. The American League owners met again on November 8, and duly approved Johnson's bid to buy the Athletics. Johnson's first act was to request permission to move to Kansas City. This proved more difficult, since it required a three-fourths majority. However, Detroit owner Spike Briggs was persuaded to change his vote, ending the Athletics' 54-year stay in Philadelphia.

== Legacy ==
The Athletics played the Phillies for the first time in interleague play in June 2003 at Veterans Stadium. The Phillies invited former Athletics Eddie Joost and Gus Zernial to the games. Connie Mack's daughter Ruth Mack Clark attended the first game. Former Florida U.S. Senator Connie Mack III, Mack's grandson, threw out the first ball.

In turn, the Phillies played the Athletics in Oakland in June 2005. The A's invited Eddie Joost to throw out the first pitch before the series opening game on June 17, 2005. In 2011 the Athletics visited the Phillies at Citizens Bank Park for an interleague series in which the Phillies took two out of three games.

There remains a level of nostalgia for the Athletics in the Philadelphia region. A Philadelphia Athletics Historical Society exists with an active website, and a local company called Shibe Vintage Sports sells retro Philadelphia Athletics gear.

By 2022, the Athletics franchise had played in Oakland, California longer than Philadelphia. In 2023, the team announced its intention to move to Las Vegas, Nevada effective in 2028.

In 2024 the team announced that it would move to West Sacramento for the 2025–2027 seasons.

== Achievements ==
=== Hall of Famers ===
Philadelphia Athletics Hall of Famers
Affiliation according to the National Baseball Hall of Fame and Museum

**Home Run Baker** *
**Chief Bender** *
Ty Cobb
Mickey Cochrane *

Eddie Collins
Jimmy Collins
Stan Coveleski
Elmer Flick

Nellie Fox
Jimmie Foxx *
Lefty Grove *
Waite Hoyt
George Kell

Nap Lajoie
Connie Mack *
Herb Pennock
**Eddie Plank** *

**Al Simmons** *
Tris Speaker
**Rube Waddell** *
Zack Wheat

- Players and managers listed in **bold** are depicted on their Hall of Fame plaques wearing a Philadelphia Athletics cap insignia.
- * Philadelphia Athletics listed as primary team according to the Hall of Fame

=== Philadelphia Athletics Hall of Fame ===
Key
**Bold**	Member of the Baseball Hall of Fame
†	Member of the Baseball Hall of Fame as a Philadelphia Athletic

**Athletics Hall of Fame**
Year	No.	Player	Position	Tenure
2021	—	**Connie Mack**^{†}	Manager; Owner	1901–1950; 1901–1954
2021	—	**Eddie Collins**	2B	1906–1914; 1927–1930
2021	—	**Frank "Home Run" Baker**^{†}	3B	1908–1914
2021	—	**Charles "Chief" Bender**^{†}	P	1903–1914
2021	2	**Mickey Cochrane**	C	1925–1933
2021	2, 3	**Jimmie Foxx**	1B	1925–1935
2021	10	**Lefty Grove**	P	1925–1933
2021	—	**Eddie Plank**^{†}	P	1901–1914
2021	6, 7, 28, 32	**Al Simmons**^{†}	LF; Coach	1924–1932; 1940–1941, 1944; 1940–1945
2021	—	**Rube Waddell**^{†}	P	1902–1907
2023	26, 7, 4	Bob Johnson	LF	1933–1942
2024	1	Eddie Joost	SS; Manager	1947–1954; 1954

=== Philadelphia Baseball Wall of Fame ===
The Athletics have all of the numbers of the Hall-of-Fame players from the Philadelphia Athletics displayed at their stadium, as well as all of the years that the Philadelphia Athletics won World Championships (1910, 1911, 1913, 1929, and 1930).

Also, from 1978 to 2003 (except 1983), the Philadelphia Phillies inducted one former Athletic (and one former Phillie) each year into the Philadelphia Baseball Wall of Fame at the then-existing Veterans Stadium. 25 Athletics have been honored. In March 2004, after Veterans Stadium was replaced by the new Citizens Bank Park, the Athletics' plaques were moved to the Philadelphia Athletics Historical Society in Hatboro, Pennsylvania, and a single plaque listing all of the Athletics inductees was attached to a statue of Connie Mack that is located across the street from Citizens Bank Park.

Key
Year	Year inducted
**Bold**	Member of the Baseball Hall of Fame
†	Member of the Baseball Hall of Fame as a member of the A's

**Philadelphia Baseball Wall of Fame**
No.	Player	Position	Tenure	Inducted
—	**Frank "Home Run" Baker**^{†}	3B	1908–1914	1993
—	**Charles "Chief" Bender**^{†}	P	1903–1914	1991
4, 6, 10, 14	Sam Chapman	CF	1938–1951	1999
2	**Mickey Cochrane**	C	1925–1933	1982
—	**Eddie Collins**	2B	1906–1914; 1927–1930	1987
—	Jack Coombs	P	1906–1914	1992
5	Jimmy Dykes	3B/2B; Coach; Manager	1918–1932; 1940–1950; 1951–1953	1984
11	George Earnshaw	P	1928–1933	2000
5, 8	Ferris Fain	1B	1947–1952	1997
2, 3, 4	**Jimmie Foxx**	1B	1925–1935	1979
10	**Lefty Grove**	P	1925–1933	1980
4, 7, 26	"Indian Bob" Johnson	LF	1933–1942	1989
1	Eddie Joost	SS; Manager	1947–1954; 1954	1995
—	**Connie Mack**^{†}	Manager; Owner	1901–1950; 1901–1954	1978
9, 27	Bing Miller	RF	1922–1926; 1928–1934	1998
1, 2, 9, 19	Wally Moses	RF	1935–1941; 1949–1951	1988
—	Rube Oldring	CF	1906–1916; 1918	2003
—	**Eddie Plank**^{†}	P	1901–1914	1985
14	Eddie Rommel	P	1920–1932	1996
21, 30	Bobby Shantz	P	1949–1954	1994
6, 7, 28, 32	**Al Simmons**^{†}	LF; Coach	1924–1932; 1940–1941, 1944; 1940–1945	1981
10, 15, 21, 35, 38	Elmer Valo	RF	1940–1954	1990
—	**Rube Waddell**^{†}	P	1902–1907	1986
12	Rube Walberg	P	1923–1933	2002
6, 19, 30	Gus Zernial	LF	1951–1954	2001

=== Philadelphia Sports Hall of Fame ===
Athletics in the Philadelphia Sports Hall of Fame
No.	Name	Position	Tenure	Inducted	Notes
—	Connie Mack	Manager; Owner	1901–1950; 1901–1954	2004	
2, 3, 4	Jimmie Foxx	1B	1925–1935	2004	
10	Lefty Grove	P	1925–1933	2005	
6, 7, 28, 32	Al Simmons	LF; Coach	1924–1932; 1940–1941, 1944; 1940–1945	2006	
2	Mickey Cochrane	C	1925–1933	2007	
—	Eddie Collins	2B	1906–1914; 1927–1930	2009	
21, 30	Bobby Shantz	P	1949–1954	2010	
5	Jimmy Dykes	3B/2B; Coach; Manager	1918–1932; 1940–1950; 1951–1953	2011	Born in Philadelphia
—	Eddie Plank	P	1901–1914	2012	
—	Charles "Chief" Bender	P	1903–1914	2014	
—	Herb Pennock	P	1912–1915	2014	Elected mainly on his performance with New York Yankees
—	By Saam	Broadcaster	1938–1954	2014	
4, 7, 26	Bob Johnson	LF	1933–1942	2017	
—	Home Run Baker	3B	1908–1914	2019	

== See also ==
- History of the Oakland Athletics
- List of Philadelphia and Kansas City Athletics Opening Day starting pitchers
- Philadelphia Baseball Wall of Fame (including Philadelphia Athletics inductees from 1978 to 2003)

Awards and achievements
Preceded by Pittsburgh Pirates; 1909	World Series champions Philadelphia Athletics; 1910–1911	Succeeded by Boston Red Sox; 1912
Preceded by Boston Red Sox; 1912	World Series champions Philadelphia Athletics; 1913	Succeeded by Boston Braves; 1914
Preceded by New York Yankees; 1927–1928	World Series champions Philadelphia Athletics; 1929–1930	Succeeded by St. Louis Cardinals; 1931
Preceded by Chicago White Sox; 1901	American League champions Philadelphia Athletics; 1902	Succeeded by Boston Americans; 1903
Preceded by Boston Americans; 1903	American League champions Philadelphia Athletics; 1905	Succeeded by Chicago White Sox; 1906
Preceded by Detroit Tigers; 1907–1909	American League champions Philadelphia Athletics; 1910–1911	Succeeded by Boston Red Sox; 1912
Preceded by Boston Red Sox; 1912	American League champions Philadelphia Athletics; 1913–1914	Succeeded by Boston Red Sox; 1915
Preceded by New York Yankees; 1926–1928	American League champions Philadelphia Athletics; 1929–1931	Succeeded by New York Yankees; 1932
