= Arthur Ehlers =

- Born: January 22, 1897; Baltimore, Maryland, U.S.
- Died: February 7, 1977 (aged 80); Baltimore, Maryland, U.S.
- Occupation(s): Major League Baseball scout and executive
- Years active: 1946–1973

Arthur H. Ehlers (January 22, 1897 – February 7, 1977) was an American front office executive in minor and Major League Baseball. He was the first general manager in the history of the modern Baltimore Orioles, serving as their front-office boss during their return to the American League as the former St. Louis Browns in 1954.

A former minor league player and a Baltimore native, Ehlers began his front office career as an executive with several minor league teams and circuits, including a stint as part-owner of the Reading Chicks of the Class B Interstate League, president of the Interstate loop (1941–45) and promotions director of the National Association of Professional Baseball Leagues.

== Executive with Philadelphia Athletics ==
From 1947 to 1950, Ehlers served as the farm system director of the Philadelphia Athletics. In September 1950, a tumultuous year for that franchise, Ehlers succeeded Baseball Hall of Fame catcher Mickey Cochrane as general manager of the Athletics upon an ownership reorganization involving two warring branches of the Connie Mack family. As a consequence of that restructuring, Cochrane, GM for only four months, stepped down; Connie Mack Jr. and his mother, the elder Mack's second wife, lost their bid for control of the franchise to Roy and Earle Mack, Connie Sr.'s children from his first marriage; and the elder Mack, 87 years of age and celebrating his 50th year at the helm of the A's, was forced into retirement.

Ehlers ran the Athletics' front office from 1951 to 1953, with veteran Jimmy Dykes as his manager. Dykes and American League Most Valuable Player Bobby Shantz wrung one last over-.500 season out of the club in 1952, but the Athletics lacked both talent and financial backing and had been supplanted by the National League Phillies as Philadelphia's top baseball team.

== First Orioles' general manager ==
After the 1953 campaign, the newly relocated Orioles lured Ehlers and Dykes to Baltimore as general manager and field manager. Each lasted only one season, 1954, in which the Orioles lost 100 out of 154 games and finished seventh in the AL—ahead of only one club, the Philadelphia Athletics.

Paul Richards, skipper of the Chicago White Sox, was hired to replace both Ehlers and Dykes on September 14, 1954. Dykes became a coach for the Cincinnati Redlegs, while Ehlers remained in Baltimore as Richards' assistant general manager. He eventually became a scout for the Orioles, retiring in 1973. Ehlers died from cancer, age 80, in Baltimore on February 7, 1977.

Preceded by Mickey Cochrane	Philadelphia Athletics General Manager; 1950–1953	Succeeded by n/a
Preceded by Bill Veeck (St. Louis Browns)	Baltimore Orioles General Manager; 1954	Succeeded by Paul Richards
