= Earle Mack =

Major League Baseball player and coach

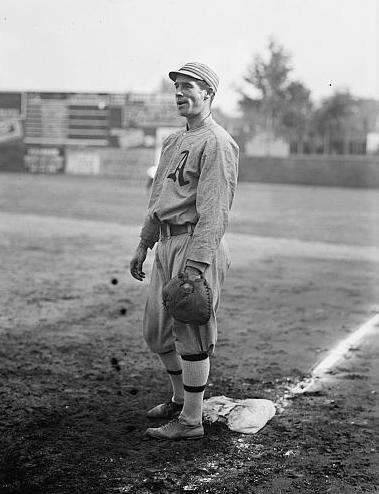
- Catcher / Third baseman / First baseman
- Born: February 1, 1890; Spencer, Massachusetts, U.S.
- Died: February 4, 1967 (aged 77); Upper Darby Township, Pennsylvania, U.S.
- Batted: Left Threw: Right

MLB debut
- October 5, 1910, for the Philadelphia Athletics

Last MLB appearance
- October 1, 1914, for the Philadelphia Athletics

MLB statistics
- Batting average: .125
- Home runs: 0
- Runs batted in: 1
- Stats at Baseball Reference
- Managerial record at Baseball Reference

Teams
- As player: Philadelphia Athletics (1910–1911, 1914); As manager: Philadelphia Athletics (1937, 1939); As coach: Philadelphia Athletics (1924–1941, 1943–1946, 1948–1950)

Career highlights and awards
- 2× World Series champion (1929, 1930)

Earle Thaddeus McGillicuddy (February 1, 1890 – February 4, 1967), known as Earle Mack, was an American player and coach in Major League Baseball, and, during parts of two seasons, manager of the Philadelphia Athletics when his father, Connie Mack, was too ill to manage. He also became a part-owner of the franchise. His nephew Connie Mack III became a U.S. Senator.

Mack was born in Spencer, Massachusetts and attended Niagara University and the University of Notre Dame. He played only five games for the Athletics between 1910 and 1914, at third base, first base, and catcher. In his only appearance in 1910, he went 2 for 4, including a triple. These would prove to be his only major league hits, as he was not played again until the following year, when he appeared in two games. Again, he would play in two games in 1914, without a hit, though he did get on base (driving in a run) and steal a base. This ended his playing career with a career batting average of .125. Mack's appearances were in the final games of the season; he played after the Athletics had clinched the pennant in each of the three seasons in which he played, and they went on to win World Series titles in 1910 and 1911. Since Mack had not been on the Athletics' roster before September 1 as required by the rules, he was ineligible to play in the World Series—even if his father had been minded to play him.

As a minor league player in 1910, Mack batted .135 in 26 games. From 1913 until 1915, Mack served as player-manager of the Raleigh team in the Class D North Carolina State League. He returned in the same capacity for the Charlotte franchise in 1917 until the league folded (no doubt a war casualty) on May 30. Mack then became player-manager of the Hanover (Pennsylvania) Raiders of the Blue Ridge League, another Class D circuit.

Mack achieved some success as the player/manager of the Moline Plowboys of the Class B Illinois–Indiana–Iowa League (often called the Three-I, or Three-Eye League). In 1921, his team, with almost no legitimate major league prospects, won the Three-I pennant. However, in his three years there (1920–22), the team had only a 196-214 record.

Mack's final season as a minor league manager was 1923, returning to the Blue Ridge League and managing the Martinsburg (WV) Blue Sox to a 67-30 record and the pennant. His father, the manager and part owner of the Athletics, hired him as a coach and assistant manager in 1924. During the 1937 and 1939 seasons, Mack managed the Athletics when his father (by then in his mid-70s) was ill. It was widely expected that when his father retired, Earle would manage the team while his brother Roy and younger half-brother Connie Jr. would run the front office. This was not to be.

Roy and Earle considered Connie Jr., 20 years their junior, to be a mere child, and dismissed their half-brother's ideas to improve the team. Connie Jr. was able to push them through by aligning himself with the heirs of franchise co-founder Benjamin Shibe. One of the few things on which the three brothers agreed was that their father had to step down as manager. In May 1950, former A's great Jimmy Dykes, a teammate of Earle's, was named as assistant manager, replacing Earle. It was also announced that Dykes would take over as manager for the 1951 season. Earle was demoted to chief scout.

Earle had long hoped to succeed his father as permanent manager of the Athletics, even though the players questioned his baseball acumen. In spite of this, in August, Earle and Roy were able to buy out Connie Jr. and the Shibes and take effective control of the franchise. With their father mostly withdrawing into the background, Earle split day-to-day control of the franchise with Roy.

The team was heavily mortgaged, though, and continued to perform poorly both on the field and at the box office. Eventually, the Mack brothers were forced to sell, and the team relocated to Kansas City in 1954.

Earle Mack died at age 77 in Upper Darby Township, Pennsylvania and is buried in Forest Hill Cemetery, Morganton, Burke County, NC.

== See also ==
- List of second-generation Major League Baseball players
