= Roy Mack =

American sports executive (1889–1962)

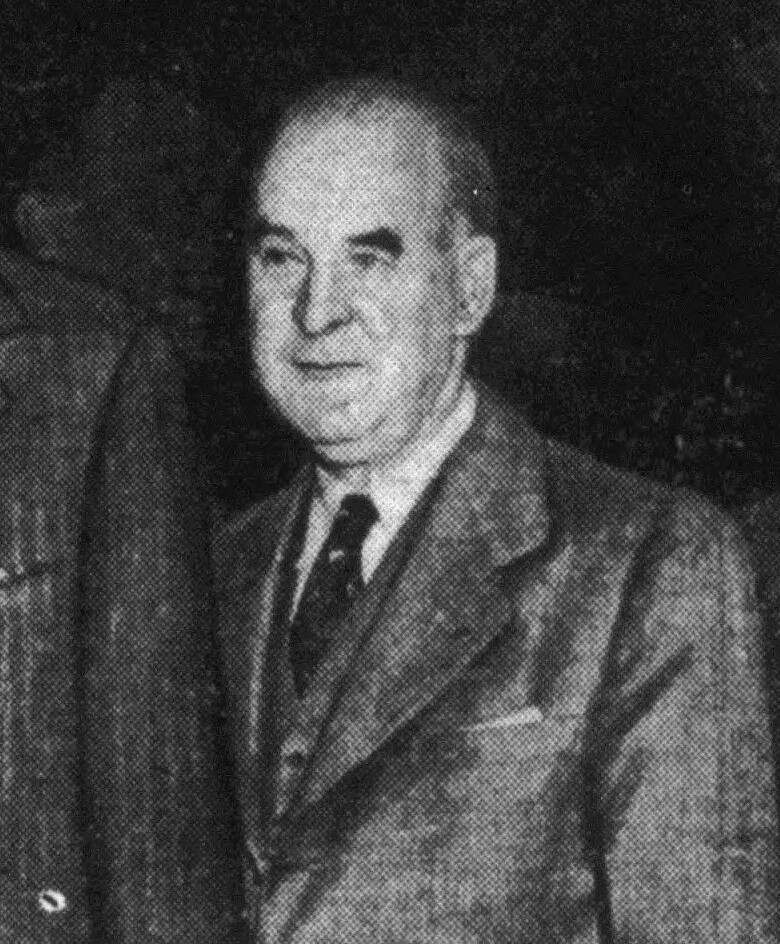
- Mack, circa 1946
- Born: Roy Francis McGillicuddy; August 27, 1888; Washington, D.C., U.S.
- Died: February 11, 1960 (aged 71); Lower Merion Township, Pennsylvania, U.S.
- Occupation: Baseball team owner
- Known for: Co-owner of Philadelphia Athletics
- Parent(s): Connie Mack; Gertrude Browning Chaffee
- Relatives: Earle Mack (brother); Michael McGillicuddy (grandfather); Mary McKillop (grandmother)

Roy Francis McGillicuddy (August 27, 1888 – February 11, 1960), known as Roy Mack, was an American baseball team executive owner who co-owned the Philadelphia Athletics of the American League with his father Connie Mack and brother Earle Mack from 1950 through 1954.

== Early life ==
Mack was born in Washington, D.C. in 1888, the son of Hall of Fame manager and Athletics co-founder Connie Mack and Gertrude Browning Chaffee. His paternal grandparents, Michael McGillicuddy and Mary McKillop, were born in Ireland. He grew up in Worcester, Massachusetts, where he attended Worcester Academy.

== Career ==
Roy Mack's baseball career was focused on front office administration and management. He served as business manager of the Baltimore Orioles of the International League from 1919 to 1924, the Portland Beavers of the Pacific Coast League, an A's minor-league affiliate, from 1924 to 1936. In 1936, he joined the Philadelphia front office in 1936 as a vice president.

=== Co-ownership of A's ===
Connie Mack acquired controlling interest in the A's in 1937, and soon afterward transferred 489 of his 891 shares in the team to Roy, Earle and their half-brother Connie Jr.; the three sons each received 163 shares. Connie Sr. intended to have his three sons inherit the team once he died or retired, with Roy and Connie Jr. running the business side. However, Roy and Earle spent the better part of the 1940s in a dispute with Connie Jr. over the direction of the club. Connie Jr., some 20 years younger than his half brothers, had increasingly chafed at the family's bargain-basement approach to running the team, but Roy and Earle believed their half-brother's ideas were too expensive. Connie Jr. was able to push through some of his ideas by forming an alliance with the heirs of Athletics co-founder Benjamin Shibe. One of the few things on which the two factions agreed was to persuade Connie Sr. to retire as manager after the 1950 season.

By July 1950, Connie Jr. and the Shibes decided to sell the team. However, Roy and Earle insisted on getting a thirty-day option to buy out their half-brother and the Shibes for $1.74 million. Connie Jr. didn't believe his half-brothers could pull it off, but Roy and Earle did so by mortgaging the team to Connecticut General Insurance Company (now part of CIGNA) and pledging Shibe Park as collateral. The purchase closed the following month; in the resulting reorganization, Connie Sr., Roy and Earle became the Athletics' only shareholders. While Connie Sr. nominally remained team president, he largely withdrew into the background. Roy became operating head of the franchise, representing the team at American League owners' meetings.

However, the team was now saddled with mortgage payments of $200,000 per year, making it difficult to arrest the club's declining performance on the field and deteriorating financial picture. By the end of the 1954 season, the A's were dangerously close to bankruptcy. Roy hoped to either buy the team himself or sell it to investors who would at least retain him as day-to-day head of the organization. However, none of the prospective buyers were willing to keep Roy on in a senior role, given the A's humdrum performance under his stewardship. At the same time, American League president Will Harridge and the other American League owners felt chagrin at the A's meager attendance figures; the visiting teams' cut of the gate was frequently insufficient to justify the trip. At a meeting on September 28 they gave Roy until October 12 to acquire enough financing to buy the team. He was unable to do so, and resigned himself to selling the team.

Initially, the Macks agreed to sell the Athletics to Chicago industrialist Arnold Johnson, who intended to transfer the team to Kansas City, Missouri for the following season. Shortly before an October 18 deadline to finalize the deal, however, Roy agreed to sell the A's to a group headed by Philadelphia auto dealer John Crisconi. Under the deal, Roy would buy a stake in Crisconi's syndicate and stay on as vice president. When Johnson heard of this deal, he collared Roy at his home in Bryn Mawr. Johnson offered Roy more for his stock, as well as a guaranteed post in the reorganized franchise's front office. This led Roy to reverse himself and vote against the deal he'd just negotiated, much to the chagrin of his father. However, Connie Sr. resigned himself to the sale to Johnson in an open letter to fans released in late October. Connie Sr. admitted that he didn't have enough money to run the team in 1955; unlike most of his fellow owners, he had no income apart from his baseball team. While he criticized the other owners for throwing their weight behind Johnson, he concluded that no other deal stood a chance of winning league approval.

The league approved the sale of the franchise to Johnson in November 1954, and Johnson retained Roy as vice president. However, he had no role in the relocated club's operations, and retired after one season although he maintained his ownership stake and continued to perform spring training duties for the team until his death.

== Death ==
He died in Lower Merion Township, Pennsylvania, aged 71, from a heart attack.
