= Ben Shibe =

American sporting goods and baseball executive

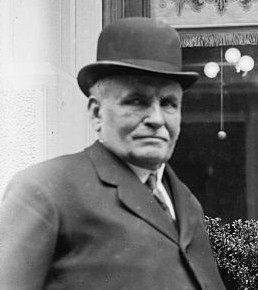
Shibe in 1910

Benjamin Franklin Shibe (January 23, 1838 – January 14, 1922) was an American sporting goods and baseball executive who was owner and president of the Philadelphia Athletics of the American League from 1901 until his death. He is credited with the invention of the automated stitching machinery to make standardized baseballs. Shibe Park was named in his honor from 1909 to 1954. Shibe died in 1922, and is buried in West Laurel Hill Cemetery, Bala Cynwyd, Pennsylvania.

Shibe was a leader of the local baseball fraternity no later than the 1870s. According to Neil Lanctot, the Shibe club was the most notable nonprofessional club in operation from 1877 to 1881, when there was no professional league team based in Philadelphia after the demise of the original Athletics.

Prior to purchasing the Athletics, Shibe and his sons worked for A. J. Reach & co., a Philadelphia sporting goods manufacturer. Shibe and his sons bought 50 percent of the Athletics from Charles Somers in 1901. At that time, he was named club president, a title he would retain until his death. He took on manager Connie Mack and two sportswriters as part-owners. In 1913, Shibe made Mack a full partner, ceding him complete authority over the baseball side of the operation. When Shibe died in 1922, his sons Tom and John became president and vice-president of the A's, respectively. However, Mack was now the operating head of the franchise. Tom died in 1936, with John following in 1937. Their heirs would retain a minority stake in the team until 1950.

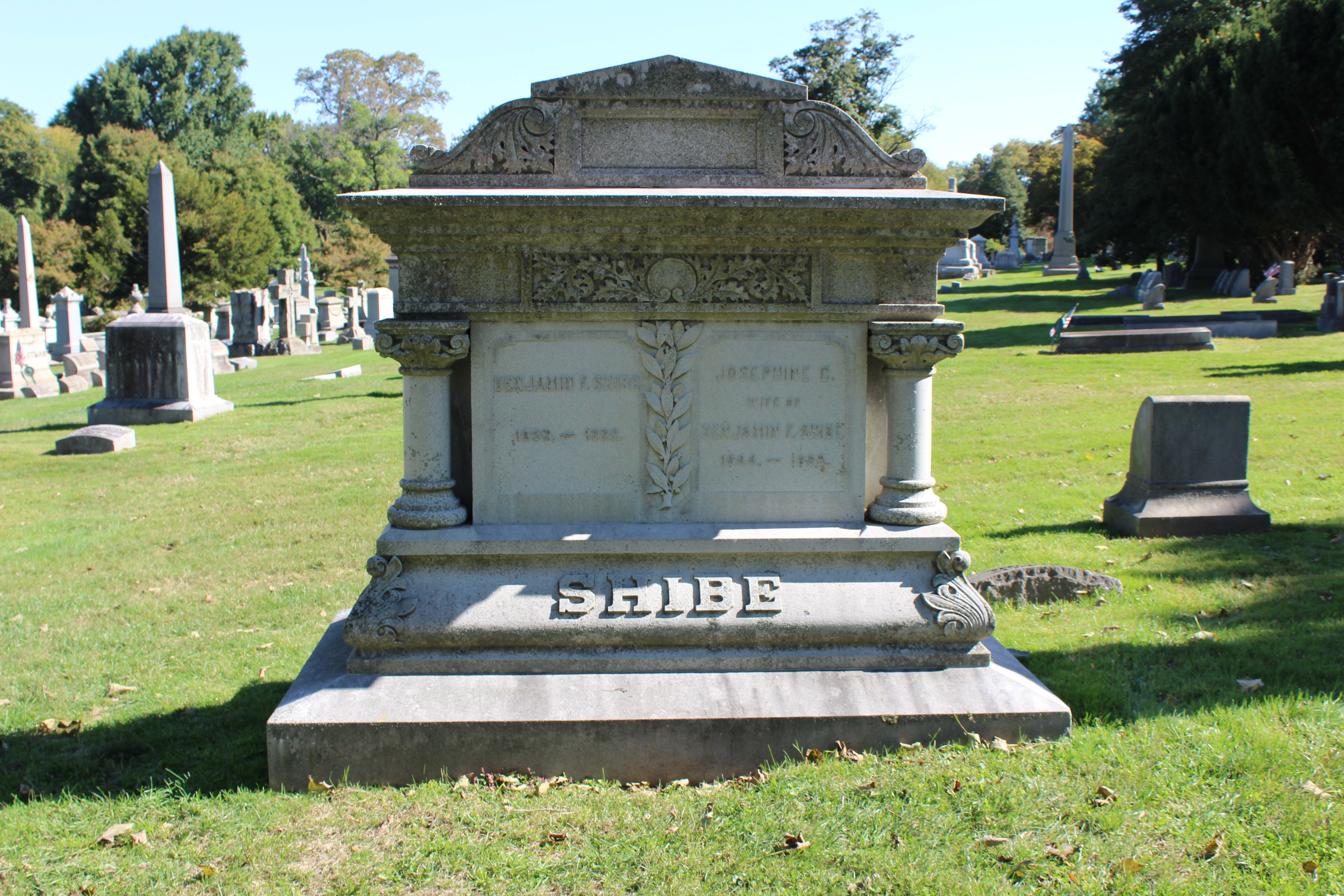
Ben Shibe tombstone in West Laurel Hill Cemetery
