= List of Athletics owners and executives =

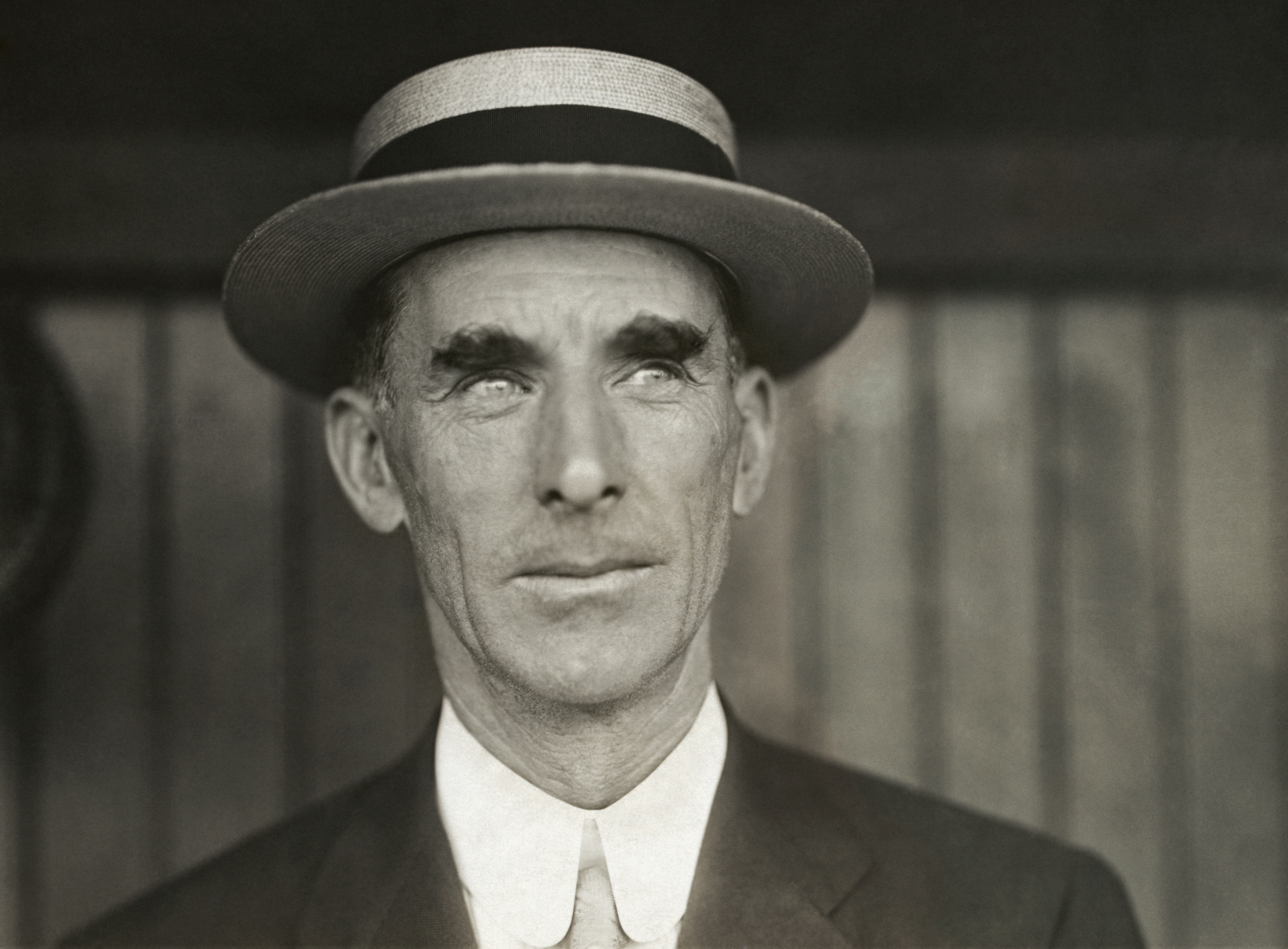
Connie Mack, the former owner of the Athletics

This is a list of team owners and executives of the Athletics.

== Team owners ==
Name	Years
Benjamin Shibe	1901–1921
Connie Mack	1901–1954
Earle Mack & Roy Mack	1950–1954
Arnold Johnson	1954–1960
Charles O. Finley	1960–1980
Walter A. Haas, Jr.	1980–1995
Stephen Schott & Ken Hofmann	1995–2005
Lewis Wolff	2005-2016
John J. Fisher	2005–present

(List does not include various owners of minority interests during the years.)

== Team executives ==
- Marc Badain, President 2025–present
- Dave Kaval, President 2016–2024
- Billy Beane, General Manager 1998–2015; VP Baseball Operations 2015–present
- Dan Feinstein, Interim General Manager 2026-present
- David Forst, General Manager 2015–2026
- Michael Crowley, President 1998–2016
- Sandy Alderson, President 1993–1995, 1997–1998; General Manager 1983–1998
- Walter J. Haas, President 1990–1992
- Roy Eisenhardt, President 1981–1986
- Billy Martin, Director Of Player Development/General Manager 1981–1982
- Charles O. Finley, General Manager (de facto, 1961–1980)
- Frank Lane, General Manager 1960–1961
- Parke Carroll, General Manager 1959–1960
- Mickey Cochrane, General Manager 1950
- Earle Mack, General Manager, 1954
- Arthur Ehlers, General Manager 1951-53
- Connie Mack General Manager (1901–1950)

(Incomplete list.)
