= Kansas City Athletics =

Professional baseball team in Kansas City, Missouri, 1955–1967

| Logo | Cap insignia |

Information
- League: Major League Baseball; American League (1955–1967)
- Location: Kansas City, Missouri
- Ballpark: Municipal Stadium (1955–1967)
- Established: 1955
- Relocated: 1968 (to Oakland, California; became the Oakland Athletics)
- World Series championships: 0
- American League pennant: 0
- Former name: Philadelphia Athletics (1901–1954)
- Colors: Royal blue, white, red (1955–1962) Kelly green, Fort Knox gold, wedding gown white (1963–1967)
- Mascot: Charlie-O
- Retired numbers: None
- Ownership: List of owners: Arnold Johnson (1955–1960); Charlie Finley (1961–1967)
- General manager: List of general managers: George Selkirk (1957–1958); Parke Carroll (1959–1960); Frank Lane (1961); Pat Friday (1961–1964); Hank Peters (1965); Eddie Lopat (1966–1967)
- Manager: List of managers: Lou Boudreau (1955–1957); Harry Craft (1957–1959); Bob Elliott (1960); Joe Gordon (1961); Hank Bauer (1961–1962); Eddie Lopat (1963–1964); Mel McGaha (1964–1965); Haywood Sullivan (1965); Alvin Dark (1966–1967); Luke Appling (1967)

The Kansas City Athletics were a Major League Baseball team that played in Kansas City, Missouri, from 1955 to 1967, having previously played in Philadelphia, Pennsylvania, as the Philadelphia Athletics. After moving to Oakland, California, in 1967, the team became the Oakland Athletics. In 2025, the team moved to West Sacramento, California as the Athletics, and plans ultimately to move to the Las Vegas metropolitan area.

The Kansas City franchise played at Municipal Stadium from 1955 to 1967.

The Kansas City Athletics had an overall win–loss record of 829–1,224–7 (.404) during their 13 years in Kansas City. Four Kansas City Athletics players were elected to the National Baseball Hall of Fame: Satchel Paige, Reggie Jackson, Enos Slaughter, and Catfish Hunter.

== History ==
=== Relocation from Philadelphia ===
In 1954, Chicago real estate magnate Arnold Johnson bought the Philadelphia Athletics and moved them to Kansas City, Missouri. Although he was initially viewed as a hero for making Kansas City a major-league town, it soon became apparent that he was motivated more by profit than any particular regard for the baseball fans of Kansas City. He had long been a business associate of New York Yankees owners Dan Topping, Larry MacPhail, and Del Webb, and had even bought Yankee Stadium in 1953, though the league owners forced Johnson to sell the property before acquiring the Athletics. Johnson had also bought Blues Stadium in Kansas City, home of the Yankees' top Triple A level Minor league baseball farm team, the Kansas City Blues of the second American Association. After Johnson got permission from the American League to move the A's to Kansas City, he sold Blues Stadium to the city, which renamed it Kansas City Municipal Stadium and leased it back to Johnson. The lease gave Johnson a three-year escape clause if the team failed to draw one million or more customers per season. The subsequent lease signed in 1960 contained an escape clause that lowered that threshold to 850,000 per season.

Normally, Johnson would have had to pay the Yankees an indemnity for moving to Kansas City, and also would have had to reimburse the Yankees for the costs they incurred for moving the Blues to Denver as the Denver Bears to make way for the A's. Major-league rules of the time gave the Yankees the major-league rights to Kansas City. However, the Yankees waived these payments as soon as the purchase was approved. Even though the Yankees had no intention of going anywhere, the waivers led to rumors of collusion between Johnson and the Yankees. The rumors grew louder due to the Yankees' thinly concealed support for the sale, to the point of planting rumors in the press to derail an 11th-hour attempt to keep the A's in Philadelphia.

=== 1955–1960: Johnson era ===
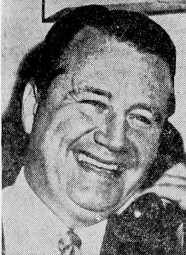
Arnold Johnson, owner of the Athletics from 1955 to 1960.

Kansas City Athletics cap logo, 1955 to 1959.

Rumors abounded that Johnson's real motive was to operate the Athletics in Kansas City for a few years, then move the team to Los Angeles (the Brooklyn Dodgers would later move there after the 1957 season). Whatever the concern about the move to Kansas City, fans turned out in record numbers for the era. In 1955, the Kansas City Athletics drew 1,393,054 to Municipal Stadium, a club record easily surpassing the previous record of 945,076 in 1948; in fact, it was the third-highest attendance figure in the majors, behind only the all-powerful Yankees and the also recently relocated Milwaukee Braves in the National League (1953–1965). That number would never be approached again while the team was in Kansas City, and would remain the club record for attendance until 1982—the Athletics' 15th season in Oakland. The A's of this era were barely competitive; in five years under Johnson's ownership, the closest they got to a winning record was 1958, when they finished 73–81, eight games below .500 and 19 games out of first.

During Johnson's tenure, virtually every good young A's player was traded to the Yankees for aging veterans and cash. Over the years, Johnson traded such key players as Roger Maris, Bobby Shantz, Héctor López, Clete Boyer, Art Ditmar and Ralph Terry to New York; in return, he did receive some talented younger players such as Norm Siebern and Jerry Lumpe, and the cash helped the team pay the bills. However, with few exceptions, the trades were heavily weighted in favor of the Yankees and arguably helped keep the Yankee dynasty afloat. For example, ten players from the 1961 Yankees, reckoned as one of the best teams of all time, came from the A's. This led to accusations from fans, reporters and even other teams that Johnson had reduced the A's to a Yankee farm team at the major-league level. Bill Veeck, for instance, recalled that under Johnson, the A's were "nothing more than a loosely controlled Yankee farm club."

On the positive side, Johnson devoted attention to player development for the first time in the history of the franchise. Under longtime owner and manager Connie Mack, the A's did not or could not spend any money building a farm system, a major reason why Mack's Philadelphia teams fell from World Series champions to cellar-dwellers so quickly. When Johnson bought the team, the A's only had three scouts in the entire organization. Johnson did make some improvements to the farm system, but was unwilling to pay top dollar for players that could get the A's within sight of contention.

==== 1955 ====
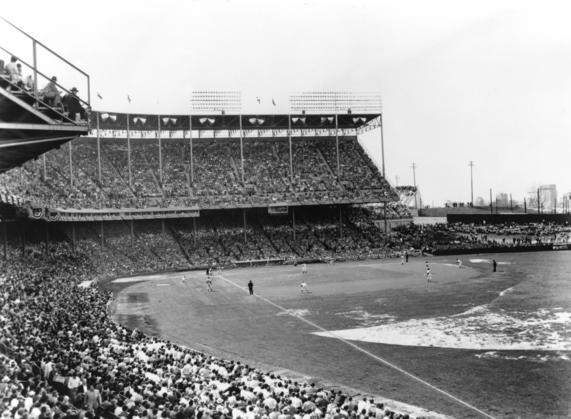
The Athletics played at Municipal Stadium during their time in Kansas City.

In the inaugural season of the Athletics in Kansas City, under new manager Lou Boudreau, saw the team slightly improve compared to the final dismal years in Philadelphia, but still perform poorly. Before the June 15 trade deadline, the Athletics mostly placed in fifth or seventh place, eventually falling to a record of 22–36 (.379), in seventh place. From June 18 through the end of the season, the team would not leave sixth place, ending the season with a 63–91 (.409) record, 33 games behind the New York Yankees.

==== 1956 ====
The sophomore season of the Athletics in Kansas City saw the team slide further into mediocrity. Before June 27, the Athletics mostly wavered between sixth and seventh place, having a record of 22–32 (.407), in seventh place, by the June 15 trade deadline. From June 27 through the end of the season, the team would not leave last place, ending the season with a dismal 52–102 (.338) record, 45 games behind the World Series winning New York Yankees.

==== 1957 ====
The 1957 season saw the Athletics hire George Selkirk as general manager, and saw an improvement relative to their previous season, though still perform poorly. Early in the season, the team was roughly an average team, though as the season progressed, would slowly fall in the standings. From June 20 through the end of the season, the team hovered between seventh and eighth place. Before the August 6 game against the Chicago White Sox, the Athletics fired manager Lou Boudreau on August 6 following a 36–67 (.350) record, and Harry Craft was elevated from coach to manager. Following Craft's elevation to manager, the Athletics ended the season in seventh place, with a slightly improved record to 59–94 (.386), 38½ games behind the New York Yankees.

==== 1958: Best season in Kansas City ====
The 1958 season saw the best season of the Athletics while in Kansas City, although still finishing with a losing record. Before the All-Star break, the Athletics were somewhat competitive, mostly placing between second and third place (alternating between the Boston Red Sox), with a record of 38–39 (.494) by July 10. However, the Athletics were 12½ games behind the New York Yankees, who themselves were ahead of second place by 11 games. By August, the team fell to mostly seventh place, where they would roughly stay until season's end, with a record of 73–81 (.474), 19 games behind the World Series-winning Yankees.

==== 1959 ====
For the 1959 season, the Athletics hired Parke Carroll as their new general manager, in what would be a worse performance than the previous season. The season saw the Athletics falling and rising in the standings several times. Up to June 7, the team spent most of the season in or around fourth place, before dropping to sixth place by the June 15 trade deadline, with a record of 26–29 (.473). July would see the Athletics place at their lowest of the season in last place, but not before finishing the month in third place following an 11-game winning streak to bring the team record to 50–49 (.505) and 8½ games behind on July 30. The success would not last long, as after having a great July of 19–10 (.655), what followed was a dismal August of 9–20 (.310), which saw the team fall to seventh place, and an even more dismal September of 7–18 (.280). The Athletics would remain in seventh place until the end of the season, 28 games behind the Chicago White Sox.

==== 1960 ====
Before the season, owner Arnold Johnson was returning from watching the Athletics in spring training when he was fatally stricken with a cerebral hemorrhage. He died in West Palm Beach, Florida, on March 3, 1960, at the age of 53. His estate continued to own the team until the end of the year.

The 1960 season saw the Athletics under new manager Bob Elliot. The team placed towards the bottom of the standings for most of the season. From May onwards, the Athletics would not place above sixth, and from August through the end of the season, the team would sit exclusively in last place, ending the season with a 58–96 (.377) record, 39 games behind the New York Yankees.

=== 1961–1967: Finley era ===
On December 19, 1960, Chicago insurance magnate Charlie Finley purchased a controlling interest in the team from Johnson's estate after losing out to Johnson six years earlier in Philadelphia. He bought out the minority owners a year later. Finley promised the fans a new day. In a highly publicized move, he purchased a bus, pointed it in the direction of New York, and burned it to symbolize the end of the "special relationship" with the Yankees. He called another press conference to burn the existing lease at Municipal Stadium which included the despised "escape clause". He spent over $400,000 of his own money in stadium improvements (though in 1962 the city reimbursed $300,000 of this). He introduced new uniforms which had "Kansas City" on the road uniforms for the first time ever and an interlocking "KC" on the cap. This was the first time the franchise had acknowledged its home city on its uniforms. He announced, "My intentions are to keep the A's permanently in Kansas City and build a winning ball club. I have no intention of ever moving the franchise." The fans, in turn, regarded Finley as the savior of Major League Baseball in Kansas City.

While the A's were still dreadful in the first eight years of Finley's ownership, he began to lay the groundwork for a future contender. Finley poured significant resources into the minor league system for the first time in the history of the franchise. By 1966, the A's were reckoned as having the strongest farm system in the majors. He was assisted by the creation of the Major League Baseball draft in 1965, which forced young prospects to sign with the team that drafted them—at the price offered by the team—if they wanted to play professional baseball. Thus, Finley was spared from having to compete with wealthier teams for top talent. The Athletics, owners of the worst record in the American League in 1964, had the first pick in the first draft, selecting Rick Monday on June 8, 1965.

In regards to managing the team, Finley would hire general managers Pat Friday, Hank Peters, and Eddie Lopat between 1961 and 1967, though they mere figureheads. With the firing of Frank Lane in 1961, Finley effectively became the team's de facto general manager, and would remain so for the duration of his ownership.

==== 1961 ====
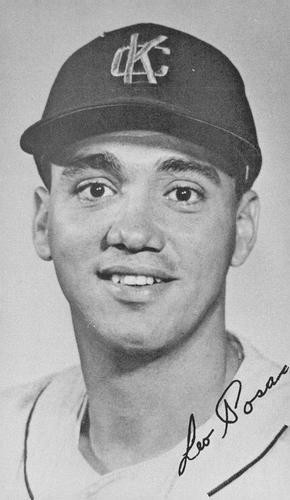
Leo Posada with the 1961 Athletics

In January, Charlie Finley hired Frank Lane, a veteran baseball man with a reputation as a prolific trader, as general manager. Lane began engineering trades with several other teams, including the Yankees, the bus-burning stunt notwithstanding. Finley also fired manager following the 1960 season and hired Joe Gordon as the new manager.

The 1961 season saw the Athletics perform poorly, with their first 100+ loss season since their worst in Kansas City in 1956. Though the team performed at league average through April and May, the Athletics would begin to falter shortly after. Before the June 19 game, Finley fired Gordon and as manager and named Hank Bauer as player-manager. By the All-Star break, the Athletics were in last place, with a dismal record of 31–52 (.373), 23 games behind the first place Detroit Tigers. Following the July 21 game, Bauer would retire from playing and take on the manager role exclusively. August would see Finley replace Lane with Pat Friday as general manager, though his sole qualification for the job was that he managed one of Finley's insurance offices. With the firing of Lane in 1961, Finley effectively became the team's de facto general manager, and would remain so for the duration of his ownership. September would see the Athletics and newly created Washington Senators fight to avoid last place, but would eventually tie for ninth place, each with a record of 61–100 (.379), 47½ games behind the World Series winning New York Yankees.

==== 1962 ====
Though still a poor showing, 1962 saw the Athletics second-best season in Kansas City to date. The team hovered between seventh and eighth place through June, before dropping to ninth for most of the rest of the season. By season's end, the Athletics finished in ninth, with a record of 61–100 (.379), 24 games behind the World Series winning New York Yankees. The poor showing led to Finley to fire manager Hank Bauer following the conclusion of the season.

==== 1963: Rebrand to Green, Gold, and White ====
Following the firing of Hank Bauer, Finley promoted Eddie Lopat from pitching coach to manager for the 1963 season. The season started with promising results, as they were competitive with at least four other teams for first place through May, having a 25–19 (.568) record on May 31, 3 games behind the Baltimore Orioles. By June 18, the team fell to eighth place, though was only 7 games behind with a record of 30–32 (.484). However, the Athletics would continue to falter for the remainder of the season, remaining roughly in eighth place through the season's end. They'd finish in eighth place with a record of 73–89 (.451), 31½ games behind the New York Yankees.

===== Rebrand =====
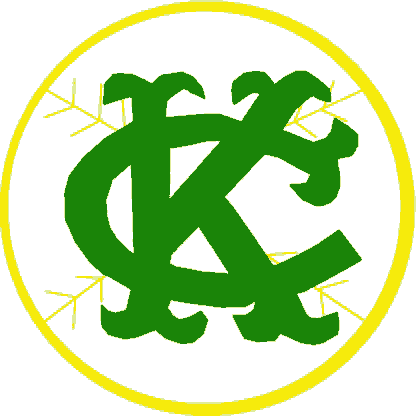
Kansas City Athletics alternate logo, 1963–1967

Finley made further changes to the team's uniforms. The Philadelphia Athletics wore blue and white or black and gray outfits through most of their history; in the last years in Philadelphia and the first in Kansas City, the team used a red, white and navy-blue scheme. In 1963, Finley changed the team's colors to "Kelly Green, Fort Knox Gold and Wedding Gown White". In June 1963, Bill Bryson wrote of the uniforms,

Kelly green is the Athletics' accent color. It was more a nauseous green the players wore on their wholesome, clean-cut faces the first few times they had to appear in public looking like refugees from a softball league.

Finley replaced Mack's elephant with a Missouri mule—not just a cartoon logo, but a real mule, which he named after himself: "Charlie O, the Mule". He also began phasing out the team name "Athletics" in favor of simply "A's". Some of his other changes—for instance, his repeated attempts to mimic Yankee Stadium's famous right-field "home run porch"—were less successful. AL President Joe Cronin ordered Finley to remove the fence which duplicated the 296-foot right-field foul line in Yankee Stadium. Smarting from this edict from the league office, Finley ordered Municipal Stadium PA announcer Jack Layton to announce, "That would have been a home run in Yankee Stadium", whenever a fly ball passed the limit in Municipal Stadium's outfield. That practice ended quickly, however, when it was apparent that other teams were hitting more "would-be" home runs than the A's.

==== 1964 ====
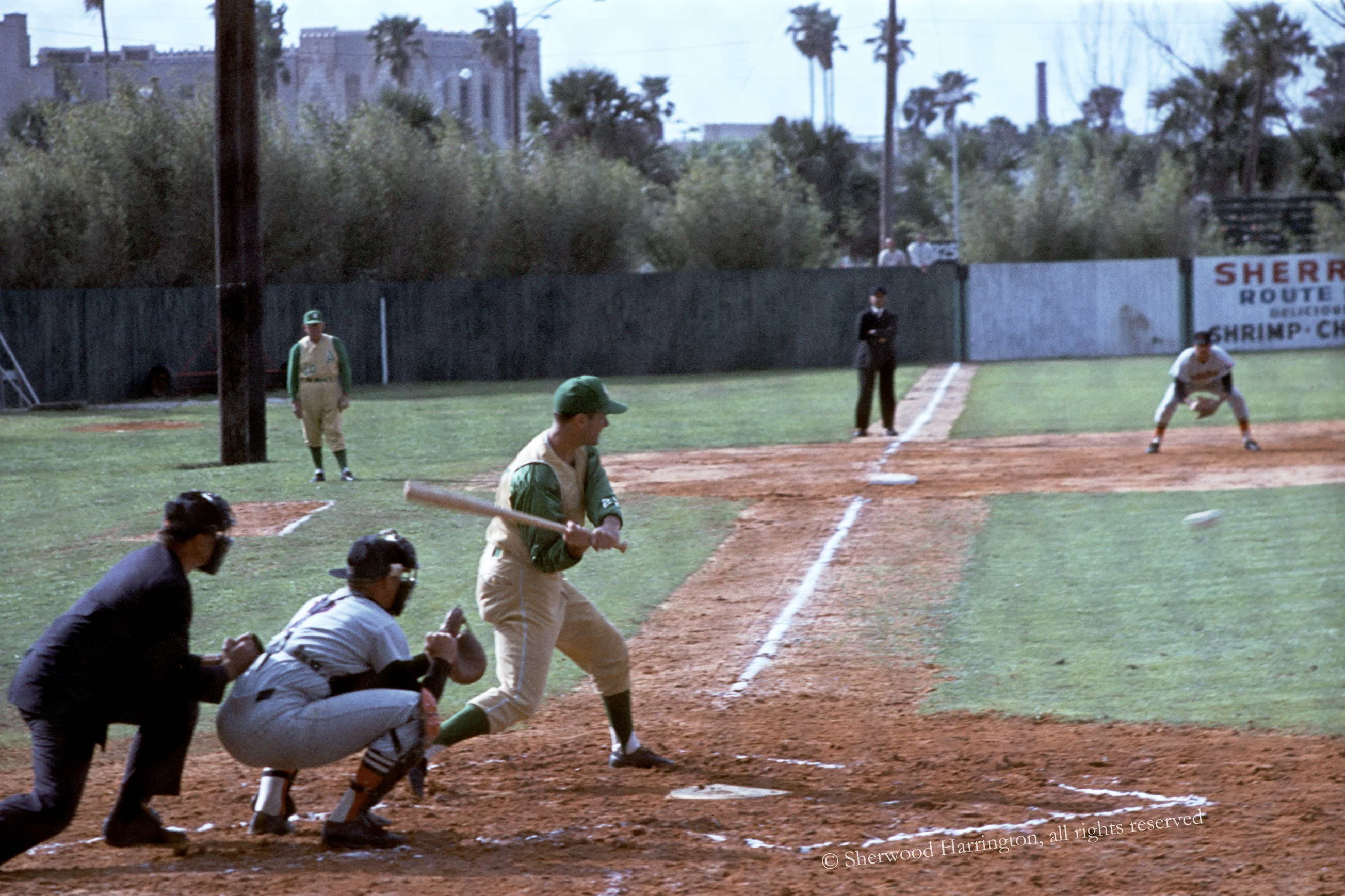
Rocky Colavito 1964 Kansas City Athletics Spring Training

The 1964 season would see the Athletics have their worst season in Kansas City since 1956. The team didn't spend a single day with a positive record and were consistently towards the bottom of the standings. From May 17 on, the teams spent the rest of the season in ninth or last place. On June 11, with a dismal record of 17–35 (.327), Finley fired manager Eddie Lopat and elevated coach Mel McGaha to manager. Though the team saw a slight improvement under McGaha (his record as manager was 40–70 (.364)), the team finished in last place, with a record of 57–105 (.352), 42 games behind the New York Yankees.

==== 1965 ====
The 1965 season saw the Athletics perform barely better than the previous season, still with a dismal performance. Finley replaced general manager Pat Friday with Hank Peters before the season. As in the previous season, the team never had a winning record. With a terribly poor start of 5–21 (.192), sitting in last place by 4½ games behind the ninth place Washington Senators, manager Mel McGaha was fired following the game on May 15. Manager of the team's Triple-A affiliate Vancouver Mounties of the Pacific Coast League, Haywood Sullivan, was promoted to manager of the major league team. Under his supervision, the team played better, though it would still barely see a day out of last place. The season ended with the Athletics in last place, with a record of 59–103 (.364), 43 games behind the Minnesota Twins.

===== Satchel Paige =====
The 1965 season is most notable for a promotional move of Finley's. On September 25, against the Boston Red Sox, Finley invited several Negro league veterans, including Satchel Paige and Cool Papa Bell, to be introduced before the game. Paige, who was 59 at the time, had signed earlier in the month to play one game. This game would make Paige the oldest player to ever play in Major League Baseball. Paige went three scoreless innings, facing ten batters and giving up only one hit and throwing one strikeout.

==== 1966 ====
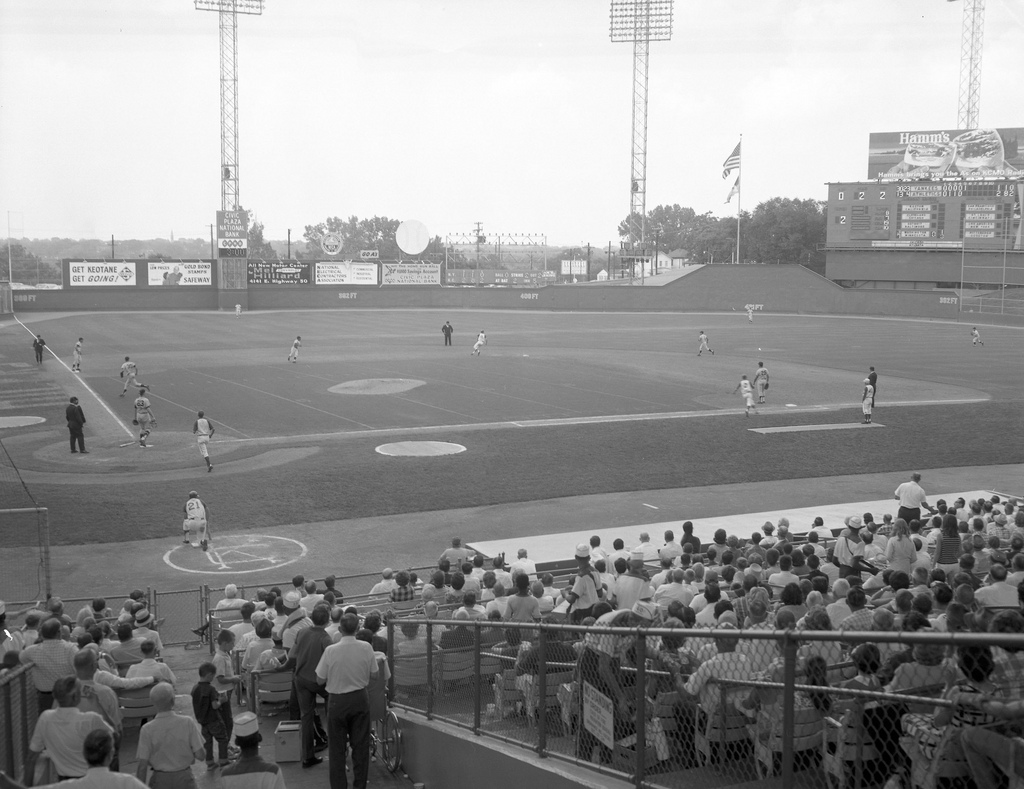
Yankees vs. Athletics at Municipal Stadium

The 1966 season would see Finley replace general manager Hank Peters and manager Haywood Sullivan with Eddie Lopat and Alvin Dark, respectively. The new duo would oversee the second-best season of the Athletics in Kansas City, second only to the 1958 season. This relative success was not before starting the season with a 3–14 (.176) record by May 5, which was the worst start of the Athletics tenure in Kansas City. The team spent most of the season wavering between eighth and last place, though September saw the Athletics improve to seventh place, where they finished the season. Their record was 74–86 (.463), 23 games behind the World Series winning Baltimore Orioles.

==== 1967 ====
The final season of the Athletics in Kansas City was reflective of the team's tenure in Kansas City: that of mediocrity. From April to May, the team slowly improved from being a "second division" to "first division" team, having placed in the upper half of the league, even placing as high as third by May 25 (albeit in a three-way tie with the Baltimore Orioles and Boston Red Sox), with an 18–18 (.500) record and 5½ games behind the first place Chicago White Sox. However, any sense of being competitive quickly deteriorated, as the team was in ninth place by the end of May and would exclusively place at ninth or last from June 25 on. August 6 saw the Athletics fall to last place permanently. Following the August 19 game, with a 52–69 (.430) record, manager Alvin Dark was replaced by Luke Appling. Appling would oversee the team's final 40 games with a 10–30 (.250), eventually ending the Athletics season with a 62–99 (.385) record, 29½ games behind the Red Sox.

During the World Series on October 11, Finley announced Oakland as his team's new desired home. Just four days later, Eddie Lopat resigned as general manager, a role which would not be filled in the Athletics franchise until 1981. Three days later, the Athletics were given permission to move to Oakland for the 1968, officially marking the 1967 season as the final season of the Kansas City Athletics.

=== Relocation to Oakland ===
Almost as soon as the ink dried on his purchase of the Athletics, Finley began shopping the Athletics to other cities despite his promises that the A's would remain in Kansas City. Soon after the lease-burning stunt, it was discovered that what actually burned was a blank boilerplate commercial lease available at any stationery store. The actual lease was still in force—including the escape clause. Finley later admitted that the whole thing was a publicity stunt, and he had no intention of amending the lease.

In 1961 and 1962, Finley talked to people in Dallas–Fort Worth and a four-man group appeared before American League owners, but no formal motion was put forward to move the team to Texas. In January 1964, he signed an agreement on to move the A's to Louisville, promising to change the team's name to the "Kentucky Athletics". (Other names suggested for the team were the "Louisville Sluggers" and "Kentucky Colonels", which would have allowed the team to keep the letters "KC" on their uniforms.) The owners turned it down by a 9–1 margin on January 16, with Finley being the only one voting in favor. Six weeks later, by the same 9–1 margin, the AL owners denied Finley's request to move the team to Oakland.

These requests came as no surprise, as impending moves to these cities, as well as to Atlanta, Milwaukee, New Orleans, San Diego, and Seattle—all of which Finley had considered as new homes for the Athletics—had long been afloat. He also threatened to move the A's to a "cow pasture" in Peculiar, Missouri, complete with temporary grandstands. Not surprisingly, attendance tailed off. The city rejected Finley's offer of a two-year lease agreement; finally, American League President Joe Cronin persuaded Finley to sign a four-year lease with Municipal Stadium in February 1964.

During the World Series on October 11, 1967, Finley announced his choice of Oakland over Seattle as the team's new home. A week later on October 18 in Chicago, AL owners at last gave him permission to move the Athletics to Oakland for the 1968 season. According to some reports, Cronin promised Finley that he could move the team after the 1967 season as an incentive to sign the new lease with Municipal Stadium. The move came in spite of approval by voters in Jackson County, Missouri of a bond issue for a brand new baseball stadium (the eventual Royals Stadium, now Kauffman Stadium) to be completed in 1973. Senator Stuart Symington of Missouri blasted Finley on the floor of the U.S. Senate, calling Oakland "the luckiest city since Hiroshima".

== Legacy ==
When Symington threatened to have baseball's antitrust exemption revoked, the owners responded with a hasty round of expansion. Kansas City was awarded an American League expansion team, the Kansas City Royals. Needing a twelfth team to maintain an even number of teams, the AL settled on Seattle as the home of a second expansion team, the Seattle Pilots. They were initially slated to begin play in 1971, but Symington was not willing to have Kansas City wait three years for another team, and renewed his threat to have baseball's antitrust exemption revoked unless the Royals began play in 1969, two years earlier than originally planned. The owners complied.

It soon became apparent that while Kansas City had an MLB-caliber stadium and well-capitalized ownership despite the rushed timetable, Seattle had neither. The Pilots' stadium and financial problems combined to make them an unviable franchise, and they were ultimately sold and moved to Milwaukee after only one season in Seattle.

== Uniforms ==
When the Philadelphia Athletics moved to Kansas City, new owner Arnold Johnson kept the franchise's traditional color scheme of red, white, and blue. The home uniforms was a plain white uniform with script "Athletics" across the chest. The road uniforms were the same save for the shirt being gray.

Following the purchase of the team in 1960 by owner Charles O. Finley, he introduced road uniforms with "Kansas City" printed on them, with an interlocking "KC" on the cap (as opposed to the previous "A"). In 1963, Finley changed the team's colors from their traditional red, white, and blue to what he termed "Kelly Green, Wedding Gown White and Fort Knox Gold". It was here that he began experimenting with dramatic uniforms to match these bright colors, such as gold sleeveless tops with green undershirts and gold pants.

== Attendance ==
During the Johnson years, the Athletics' home attendance averaged just under one million per season, respectable numbers for the era, especially in light of the team's dreadful on-field performance. In contrast, during the years of Finley's ownership, the team averaged under 680,000 per year in Kansas City. According to baseball writer Rob Neyer (a native of the Kansas City area), this was largely because Finley tried to sell baseball tickets like he sold insurance. Just before the 1960 season, he mailed brochures to 600,000 people in the area, and only made $20,000 in ticket sales. During their thirteen years in Kansas City, the Athletics' overall record was 829–1224 (.404), and the best season was 1966 at 74–86 (.463).

== Notable Kansas City Athletics ==
- Catfish Hunter, a pitcher who played on the team from 1965 to after the team's 1968 departure to Oakland. He was inducted into the Hall of Fame in 1987.
- Reggie Jackson, an outfielder who played his rookie season on the team's final season in 1967 to after the team's 1968 departure to Oakland. He was inducted into the Hall of Fame in 1993.
- Satchel Paige, a pitcher who played on the team in his first major league appearance in 12 years, for one game on September 25, 1965, at age 59. He is notably the oldest player to ever play in Major League Baseball. He was inducted into the Hall of Fame in 1971.
- Enos Slaughter, an outfielder who played on the team from 1955 to 1956. He was inducted into the Hall of Fame in 1985.

== Achievements ==
=== Hall of Famers ===
Kansas City Athletics Hall of Famers
Affiliation according to the National Baseball Hall of Fame and Museum
Kansas City Athletics

Luke Appling

Lou Boudreau

Whitey Herzog
Tommy Lasorda

Satchel Paige

Enos Slaughter

- Players and managers listed in **bold** are depicted on their Hall of Fame plaques wearing a Athletics cap insignia.
- None of the players listed had their primary team as the Kansas City Athletics according to the Hall of Fame

=== Kansas City Athletics Hall of Fame ===
Key
| **Bold** | Member of the Baseball Hall of Fame |
| † | Member of the Baseball Hall of Fame as a manager for the Oakland Athletics |

**Athletics Hall of Fame**
| Year | No. | Player | Position | Tenure |
| 2018 | 27 | **Catfish Hunter** | P | 1965–1967 |
| 2018 | 9, 44 | **Reggie Jackson** | RF | 1967 |
| 2018 | — | Charlie Finley | Owner; General Manager | 1960–1967 |
| 2019 | 19 | Bert "Campy" Campaneris | SS | 1964–1967 |
| 2022 | 6 | Sal Bando | 3B | 1966–1967 |
| 2022 | 15, 45 | Joe Rudi | LF / 1B | 1967 |
| 2024 | 23 | Dick Williams^{†} | LF / 3B | 1959–1960 |

== Season-by-season records ==
Kansas City Athletics season-by-season record
| Season | Wins | Losses | Win % | Place | Playoffs |
|---|---|---|---|---|---|
| 1955 | 63 | 91 | .409 | 6th in AL | — |
| 1956 | 52 | 102 | .338 | 8th in AL | — |
| 1957 | 59 | 94 | .386 | 7th in AL | — |
| 1958 | 73 | 81 | .474 | 7th in AL | — |
| 1959 | 66 | 88 | .429 | 7th in AL | — |
| 1960 | 58 | 96 | .377 | 8th in AL | — |
| 1961 | 61 | 100 | .379 | 9th in AL | — |
| 1962 | 72 | 90 | .444 | 9th in AL | — |
| 1963 | 73 | 89 | .451 | 8th in AL | — |
| 1964 | 57 | 105 | .352 | 10th in AL | — |
| 1965 | 59 | 103 | .364 | 10th in AL | — |
| 1966 | 74 | 86 | .463 | 7th in AL | — |
| 1967 | 62 | 99 | .385 | 10th in AL | — |
| All-Time Record | 829 | 1,224 | .404 | — | — |

== See also ==
- History of the Oakland Athletics
- List of Philadelphia and Kansas City Athletics Opening Day starting pitchers
