= Parke Carroll =

Parke Carroll (October 17, 1904 – February 4, 1961) was an American front-office executive in minor league and Major League Baseball who was primarily known for his two-year stint as the general manager of the Kansas City Athletics during the 1959 and 1960 seasons.

== Career ==
A former sportswriter and sports editor of the Kansas City Journal Post, Carroll entered baseball as business manager of the Minneapolis Millers of the American Association when the Journal Post ceased publication during World War II. He then worked for the New York Yankees' organization as business manager for the Bombers' two top farm clubs, the Newark Bears of the International League (1946–1950) and the Kansas City Blues of the American Association (1951–1954).

Carroll joined the Athletics—newly transplanted to Kansas City from Philadelphia—in November 1954 as vice president and business manager, then was promoted to general manager by owner Arnold Johnson after the end of the 1958 season. Johnson previously had not handed the general manager title to a specific executive, preferring to divide the GM responsibilities among himself, player personnel director George Selkirk, and Carroll.

During his two seasons as the Athletics' GM, Carroll engineered trades that sent key players to the New York Yankees, such as Bob Cerv and Ralph Terry, but his most notable deal came on December 11, 1959, in which Carroll sent 25-year-old outfielder Roger Maris to the Yankees along with two other players for Don Larsen (author of a World Series perfect game three years earlier), Marv Throneberry, Hank Bauer and Norm Siebern. With the aid of the short right-field porch in Yankee Stadium, Maris set a single-season record with 61 home runs in 1961, just two years after leaving the A's. Only Siebern would pay dividends for the A's, however, as their regular first baseman from 1960 to 1963 and a two-time American League All-Star.

Carroll's dealings with the Yankees were controversial because the Athletics, under owner Johnson, sent many top players to New York in apparently one-sided trades during the mid-to-late-1950s. Johnson and Selkirk had previously traded quality players such as Bobby Shantz, Clete Boyer, Harry "Suitcase" Simpson and Ryne Duren to the Yanks. Johnson also had business ties with Yankee partner Del Webb and owned Yankee Stadium in the Bronx prior to purchasing the Athletics and moving them to Kansas City. All these factors led to charges from fans, writers and other teams that Johnson and Carroll ran the Athletics as a Yankee farm team at the Major League level.

Johnson, 54, died suddenly from a cerebral hemorrhage in 1960 while he was in Florida attending the Athletics' spring training preparations for the upcoming season. His unexpected death eventually forced the sale of the club to insurance executive Charlie Finley in December 1960. Finley then promptly replaced Carroll with former Cleveland Indians' executive Frank "Trader" Lane in January 1961.

== Death ==
Carroll died suddenly of a heart attack in Kansas City, on February 4, 1961, at age 56.

Preceded by n/a	Kansas City Athletics General Manager; 1959–1960	Succeeded by Frank Lane
