= Frank Lane =

American sports executive (1895–1981)

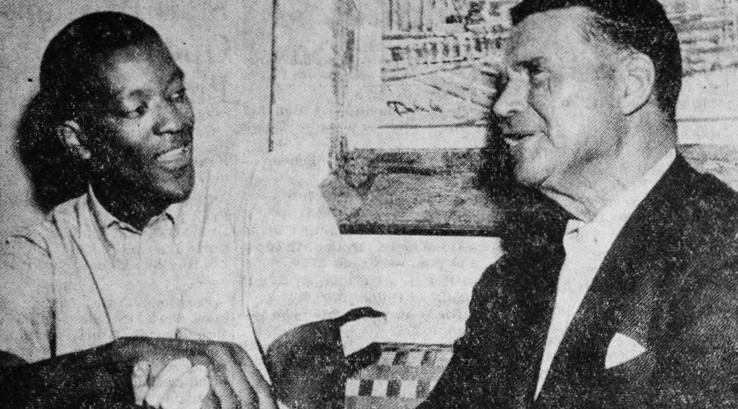
- Lane (right) shaking the hand of Bill McGill after he signed with the Chicago Packers in May 1962
- General manager, executive
- Born: February 1, 1895; Cincinnati, Ohio, U.S.
- Died: March 19, 1981 (aged 86); Richardson, Texas, U.S.

Teams
- Chicago White Sox (1948–1955); St. Louis Cardinals (1955–1957); Cleveland Indians (1957–1961); Kansas City Athletics (1961); Milwaukee Brewers (1970–1972)

Career highlights and awards
- The Sporting News Executive of the Year (1957)

Frank Charles Meyers Lane (February 1, 1895 – March 19, 1981) was an American executive in professional baseball, most notably serving as a general manager in Major League Baseball for the Chicago White Sox, St. Louis Cardinals, Cleveland Indians, Kansas City Athletics and Milwaukee Brewers for over fifteen seasons between 1948 and 1972.

== Biography ==
Frank C. Lane
Profile
- Position: Guard

Personal information
- Born: February 1, 1895; Cincinnati, Ohio, U.S.
- Died: March 19, 1981 (aged 86); Richardson, Texas, U.S.

Career history
- c. 1910–1919: Cincinnati Celts

Other information
- Military career
- Allegiance: United States
- Branch: United States Navy
- Service years: 1942–1946
- Conflicts: World War II

Born in Cincinnati, Ohio, Lane's first involvement with professional sports came in American football, where he played guard for a number of "Ohio League" teams prior to the creation of the National Football League. After his attempt at playing professional baseball fell short, Lane shifted to officiating, serving as a referee in both football and basketball.

== Baseball front offices ==
In 1933 he was named as traveling secretary for the Cincinnati Reds, while continuing to spend his offseasons as an official. After later spending one season as general manager of the team's Durham, North Carolina minor league club, Lane was elevated to assistant general manager for the Reds under Warren Giles on November 17, 1936.

After the U.S. entered World War II, Lane joined the Navy and spent the next four years in the service before returning in 1946 as general manager of the Kansas City Blues, a top farm club of the New York Yankees. One year in that position led to a two-year stretch as president of the minor league American Association.

=== Chicago White Sox ===
Lane then resigned that post in 1948 to become general manager of the White Sox. Over the next seven years, he shaped the team into a contender after more than two decades of mediocrity, acquiring Baseball Hall of Famers Nellie Fox and Minnie Miñoso, and All-Stars Chico Carrasquel, Sherm Lollar and Billy Pierce, among many others. Fox, a future 15-time All-Star and 1959 American League MVP, was acquired from the Philadelphia Athletics at age 21, straight-up for backup catcher Joe Tipton; the price of the Detroit Tigers' Pierce (also 21), a future seven-time AL All-Star who would win 186 games in a White Sox uniform, was another catcher, 33-year-old Aaron Robinson, who had only three major-league seasons left in his tank. In his seven years in Chicago, Lane made 241 trades. The ChiSox made their league's first division in 1951, and topped the one-million mark in attendance each year for the remainder of Lane's tenure.

=== St. Louis Cardinals ===
After resigning in September 1955, Lane quickly found work again in St. Louis, signing a three-year contract as general manager of the Cardinals on October 6. His first controversial move was to introduce new home and away uniforms of which the pair of redbirds on a bat was removed in favor of only the name "Cardinals" in red script edged with navy blue. In what he subsequently referred to as "the worst trade [he] ever made," Lane sent Bill Virdon, recipient of the previous season's National League Rookie of the Year Award, to the Pirates for Bobby Del Greco and Dick Littlefield on May 17, 1956. When Lane tried to trade superstar hitter Stan Musial to the Philadelphia Phillies for pitcher Robin Roberts—both future Hall of Famers—news of the proposed transaction was leaked to the radio and Cardinals' owner August A. Busch Jr. stopped the deal.

=== Cleveland Indians ===
The Cardinals finished second in their league in 1957, eight games out, but Lane moved on to Cleveland in November to take the reins of the Indians' front office. There he gained infamy in April 1960 by trading popular star slugger Rocky Colavito, who co-led the Junior Circuit in home runs in 1959, to the Detroit Tigers for Harvey Kuenn, the defending American League batting champion, whom Lane would trade to the San Francisco Giants on December 3 for John Antonelli and Willie Kirkland; this was the final trade for Lane as GM of the Indians.

=== Kansas City Athletics ===
Lane left Cleveland in January 1961 to become general manager of the Kansas City Athletics, but the combination of Lane and volatile owner Charlie Finley led to an early end to Lane's employment just eight months later, and a lawsuit ensued. Due to his uncertain contract status, Lane was forced out of baseball during this period, but found employment in early 1962 as general manager of the National Basketball Association's Chicago Packers. He did not join the team when they moved to Baltimore after the 1963 season. The following year, the lawsuit finally went to trial.

On January 8, 1965, Lane settled his lawsuit with Finley, accepting $113,000 plus the freedom to take another baseball front-office position. Early reports of his being part of an ownership group to buy the Boston Red Sox, as well as potentially serving as president of the Texas League, proved to be unfounded. Instead, he was appointed as a special assistant to the president with the Baltimore Orioles two months later on March 6, handling the duties of a scout, field representative and traveling ambassador. He served in that capacity for nearly six years.

=== Milwaukee Brewers ===
Shortly before his 76th birthday, Lane was hired as director of player personnel with the Milwaukee Brewers on January 23, 1971. He took advantage of the rain postponement of Game 2 of the 1971 World Series on October 10 to acquire George Scott, Jim Lonborg, Ken Brett, Billy Conigliaro, Joe Lahoud and Don Pavletich in a ten-player blockbuster that also sent Tommy Harper, Marty Pattin, Lew Krausse Jr. and minor-league outfielder Pat Skrable to the Red Sox. Lane ended his career as a scout for both the California Angels and Texas Rangers.

== Death and reputation ==
Lane gained fame (and sometimes infamy) for his many transactions, earning nicknames such as "Trader Frank", "Frantic Frank", "Trader Lane" and "The Wheeler Dealer" for having made over 400 trades in his career, including 241 with the White Sox alone. Lane traded star players, such as Norm Cash, Rocky Colavito and Roger Maris, as well as future Hall of Famers Red Schoendienst and Early Wynn.

Yet players were not the only people involved in Lane's transactions – in 1960, during his tenure with the Indians, he dealt manager Joe Gordon in exchange for Detroit Tigers skipper Jimmy Dykes.

He died on March 19, 1981 at the Apple Tree Nursing Home in Richardson, Texas due to a long illness, age 86. In Bobby Bragan's book You Can't Hit the Ball With the Bat On Your Shoulder, Bragan wrote that he was asked by Commissioner Bowie Kuhn's office to represent Major League Baseball at the funeral. He was the lone baseball official to attend.

Preceded by Roy Hamey	American Association President; 1947–1948	Succeeded by Bruce Dudley
Preceded by Leslie O'Connor	Chicago White Sox General Manager; 1948–1955	Succeeded by Chuck Comiskey/Johnny Rigney
Preceded by Richard A. Meyer	St. Louis Cardinals General Manager; 1955–1957	Succeeded by Bing Devine
Preceded by Hank Greenberg	Cleveland Indians General Manager; 1957–1961	Succeeded by Gabe Paul
Preceded by Parke Carroll	Kansas City Athletics General Manager; 1961	Succeeded by Pat Friday
Preceded by Marvin Milkes	Milwaukee Brewers General Manager; 1970–1972	Succeeded by Jim Wilson
