= Pat Friday (baseball executive) =

American baseball executive (1924–1993)

Friday

Francis Patrick Friday (January 16, 1924 - April 2, 1993) was an American baseball executive who served as general manager of the Kansas City Athletics for four full seasons during the 1960s.

== Biography ==
Friday was born on January 16, 1924, in Stevens Point, Wisconsin, the son of August Friday (original name Napiętek) and his wife Susan Glinski. On August 22, 1961, Friday became the general manager of the Athletics. When he was hired by Athletics owner Charlie Finley to replace Frank Lane as general manager, Friday had no experience in baseball. He had been in charge of an insurance office owned by Finley. He remained general manager until 1965.

In a seven-year stretch under Finley, Kansas City had seven managers and five general managers, with Friday serving the longest. Friday spent portions of five seasons as general manager. The Athletics did not have a winning season in eleven years in Kansas City. Author Susan Slusser points out that Finley was really the de facto general manager during Friday's tenure.

Friday died on April 2, 1993, in Highland Park, Illinois, at the age of 69.
