= Municipal Stadium (Kansas City, Missouri) =

Former baseball and football stadium in Kansas City, Missouri

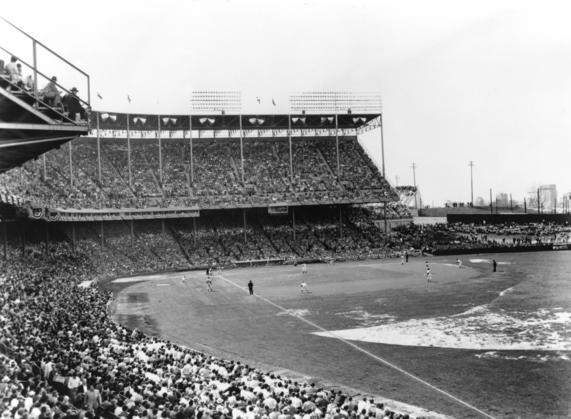
- First Athletics home game in 1955

- Location in Missouri Location in United States
- Former names: Muehlebach Field (1923–1937); Ruppert Stadium (1937–1943); Blues Stadium (1943–1954)
- Location: 2123 Brooklyn Avenue; Kansas City, Missouri
- Coordinates: 39.087°N 94.558°W
- Owner: City of Kansas City
- Operator: City of Kansas City
- Capacity: 17,476 (1923–1955); 30,296 (1955–1961); 34,165 (1961–1969); 34,164 (1969–1971); 35,561 (1971–1972)
- Surface: Natural grass
- Field size: 1923; Left Field – 350 ft (107 m); Center F. – 450 ft (137 m); Right Field – 350 ft (107 m); 1972; Left Field – 369 ft (112 m); L. Center – 408 ft (124 m); Center F. – 421 ft (128 m); R. Center – 382 ft (116 m); Right Field – 338 ft (103 m)

Construction
- Groundbreaking: 1923
- Opened: July 3, 1923; April 12, 1955
- Closed: October 4, 1972
- Demolished: 1976
- Cost: $400,000
- Architect: Osborn Engineering
- Main contractors: Del E. Webb Construction Company, 1955

Tenants
- Kansas City Blues (AA) (1923–1954); Kansas City Monarchs (NNL / NAL) (1923–1931, 1937–1955); Kansas City Blues / Cowboys (NFL) (1924–1926); Kansas City Athletics (MLB) (1955–1967); Kansas City Chiefs (AFL / NFL) (1963–1971); Kansas City Spurs (NASL) (1968–1969); Kansas City Royals (MLB) (1969–1972)

Kansas City Municipal Stadium was an American baseball and football stadium in the central United States, located in Kansas City, Missouri. It was located at the corner of Brooklyn Avenue and E. 22nd Street.

Municipal Stadium hosted both the minor-league Kansas City Blues of the American Association and the Kansas City Monarchs of the Negro leagues from 1923 to 1955.

The stadium was almost completely rebuilt prior to the 1955 baseball season when the Kansas City Athletics moved to Kansas City from Philadelphia. The Athletics played from 1955 to 1967, the Kansas City Royals from 1969 to 1972, the Kansas City Chiefs (American Football League and National Football League) from 1963 to 1971 and the Kansas City Spurs (North American Soccer League) from 1968 to 1969.

The stadium hosted the Major League Baseball All-Star Game in 1960 (first game). In the final football game played there, Municipal Stadium was the site of the longest NFL game in history, a playoff game between the Chiefs and the Miami Dolphins on Christmas Day 1971; the Chiefs moved to the new Arrowhead Stadium in 1972. Jackie Robinson played at the stadium for the Kansas City Monarchs in 1945 until he was signed by the Brooklyn Dodgers.

== Early stadium history ==
The stadium opened in 1923 as Muehlebach Field. It was named for George E. Muehlebach ( /ˈmjuːlbɑːk/), who owned the Blues and a number of other Kansas City businesses, including Muehlebach Beer and the Muehlebach Hotel. It was built for the minor-league Blues for $400,000. It served as a replacement for the Blues' previous home, Association Park.

Located in the inner-city neighborhood near 18th and Vine, the stadium first housed the minor-league white Kansas City Blues baseball team and the Negro league Kansas City Monarchs. The first Negro World Series game was held at the stadium in 1924. The Negro Leagues Baseball Museum, founded in 1990, is a few blocks from the site.

The stadium consisted of a single-decked, mostly covered, grandstand, extending from the right-field foul pole down and around most of the left-field line. When the New York Yankees bought the Blues as its top farm team in 1937, the stadium was renamed Ruppert Stadium in honor of the Yankees' owner, Col. Jacob Ruppert. Ruppert died two years later and the stadium was renamed Blues Stadium in 1943.

== Rebuilding for Major League Baseball – 1955 ==
Single decked and double decked

Arnold Johnson, a Chicago real estate magnate, bought both Blues Stadium and Yankee Stadium in 1953. Johnson then bought the Philadelphia Athletics from Connie Mack in November 1954, announcing plans to move the A's from Philadelphia to Kansas City. Johnson then sold Blues Stadium to the city, who renamed it Municipal Stadium and leased it back to the A's.

Muehlebach had anticipated that Kansas City would eventually get a major league team. Accordingly, he designed the stadium with footings that were theoretically strong enough to support a future upper deck. However, when work began on double-decking the stadium for the A's, it was discovered that three decades of harsh Midwestern winters had weakened the footings until they could no longer support the weight of an upper deck. City officials elected to completely demolish the stadium and rebuild it from scratch. The city ran three shifts and the new stadium was built in 90 days, faithful to the original design, completed in time for the 1955 season opener. The new construction was financed by a bond issuance. The expanded stadium was supposed to seat 38,000, but cost overruns as a result of overtime payments forced officials to reduce capacity to just over 30,000. The Braves Field scoreboard in Boston was purchased for $100,000 and moved from Boston to Kansas City, while temporary bleachers were added in the left field corner and parts of the outfield.

On opening day 1955, former President Harry S Truman, a resident of nearby Independence, threw out the ceremonial first pitch. Connie Mack and legendary A's player Jimmie Foxx were also in attendance. The A's defeated the Detroit Tigers, 8–2.

The baseball field was aligned northeast (home plate to center field) at an approximate elevation of 900 feet (270 m) above sea level.

== Pre-1955 teams ==
=== Kansas City Monarchs ===
From 1923 to 1955, the stadium was also home to the Negro leagues' longest-running team, the Kansas City Monarchs. The Monarchs won 11 league championships before integration (1923–25, 1929, 1931 in the NNL; 1937–40, 1942, 1946 in the NAL). They appeared in four Negro World Series. They won the first Series in 1924 and lost the second in 1925. They won the 1942 Negro World Series, and lost the 1946 Series.

Many noteworthy players played for the Monarchs at Muelbach Field. The legendary Buck O'Neil played 10 seasons for the Monarchs.

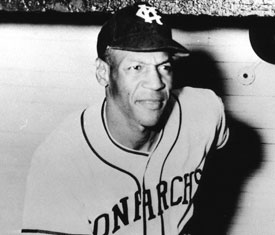
Buck O'Neil

Hall of Famers Bullet Rogan, J. L. Wilkinson, José Méndez, Satchel Paige, Hilton Smith, and Willard Brown all played for the Monarchs. Other Hall of Famers who spent a season or more with the Monarchs include: Cristóbal Torriente, Andy Cooper, Turkey Stearnes, Cool Papa Bell, Bill Foster, Willie Wells, Ernie Banks, and the legendary Jackie Robinson.

=== Jackie Robinson ===
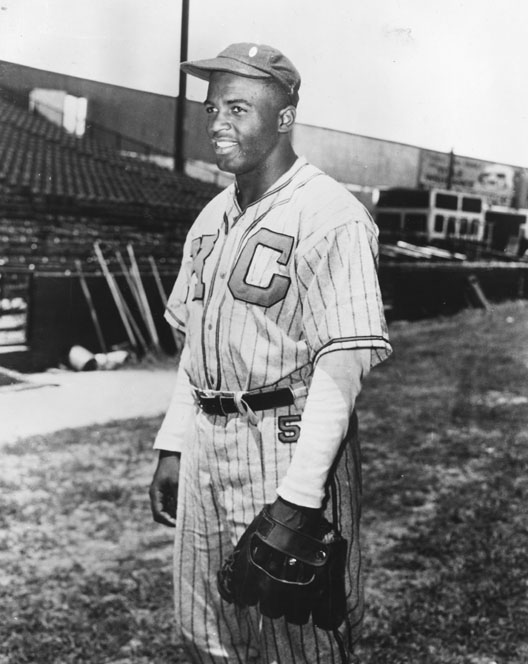
Jackie Robinson Kansas City Monarchs

After being discharged from the United States Army, Jackie Robinson signed with the Monarchs for the 1945 season. He played shortstop and was selected to play in the East-West All-Star game. While playing for the Monarchs, Robinson was scouted by the Dodgers' Branch Rickey, who signed Robinson on October 23, 1945. Robinson broke the color barrier in the Major Leagues on April 15, 1947.

=== Kansas City Blues – Minor League ===
The Kansas City Blues were one of the eight founding members of the American Association. The franchise existed in its entirety from 1888 to 1954, and was the stadium's primary tenant. The franchise was the top-level farm team for the Pittsburgh Pirates and New York Yankees. The franchise was an AA team (1923–1945) and then an AAA team (1946–54). The city's longtime support of the Blues played a major role in helping it land a Major League Baseball team.

A young Mickey Mantle hit .361 with 11 HR for the Blues in 1951.

Mickey Mantle, Whitey Ford, Ralph Houk, Al Rosen, Billy Martin, Bill Virdon, Johnny Mize and Elston Howard were some of the players in the Yankees farm era who played for the Blues. There were about 580 Blues players who went on to the Major Leagues.

== Major League Baseball ==
=== Kansas City Athletics ===
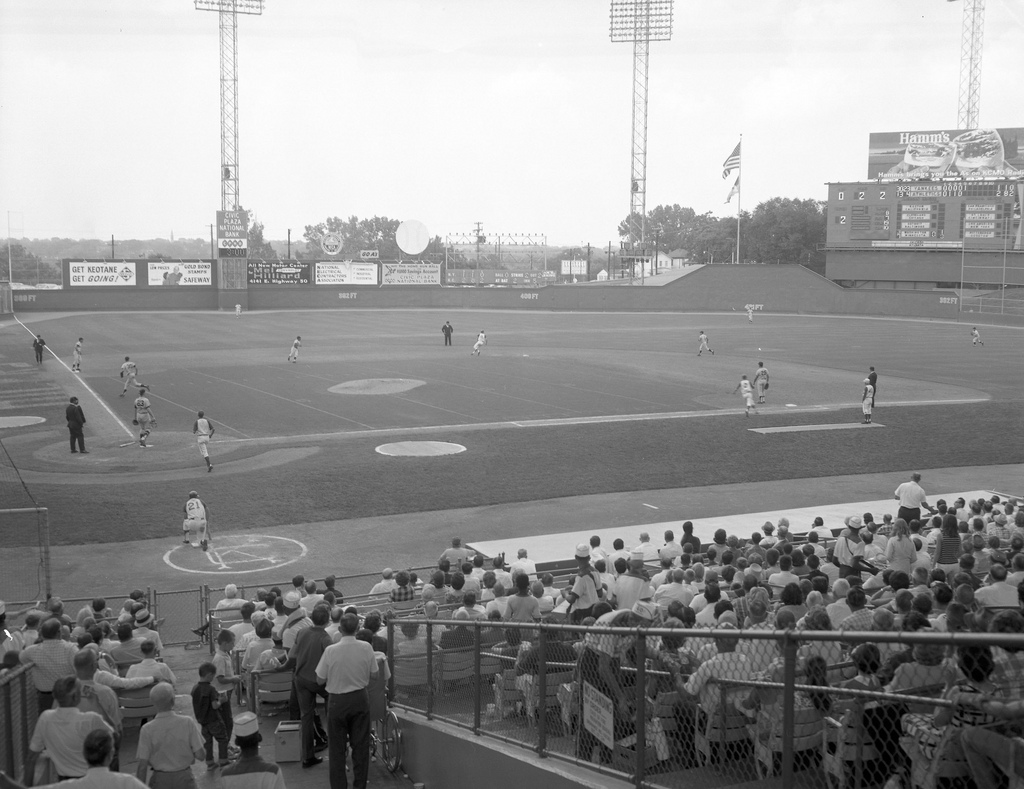
A's vs. Yankees at Municipal Stadium, 1966

The stadium was home to many of the shenanigans of Charlie Finley, who bought the A's after Arnold Johnson's death in 1960. Most notably, he tried to shorten the rather distant fences in April 1964 by creating a 296 feet (90 m) Pennant Porch in right field, fronting a tiny bleacher section, to mock the famed short fence in right field at Yankee Stadium, home of the powerful Yankees. The move was quickly vetoed by the league, so Finley rebuilt the fence to the bare legal minimum of 325 feet (99 m), and repainted the fence to say "One-Half Pennant Porch". Later he tried the ruse of putting a canopy over the little bleacher, which just happened to have an extension that reached out 29 feet (9 m) over the field. The league, not amused by Finley's sense of humor, again ordered him to cease and desist. According to legend, on a road trip that the A's made to New York, a Yankee hitter lofted a long fly ball to left field which, in the cavernous left field of Yankee Stadium, became a routine out. Yankees public address announcer Bob Sheppard is alleged to have then said over the microphone, "In Kansas City, that would have been a home run", itself a response to Finley's dictum for Municipal Stadium public address announcer Jack Layton to announce, "That would have been a home run at Yankee Stadium" for any ball hit beyond a line Finley painted in the outfield grass 296 feet away from home plate in Kansas City. Supposedly, Layton's gimmick was short-lived after Finley noticed the vast majority of the "would've been home runs" were being hit by the Athletics' opponents.

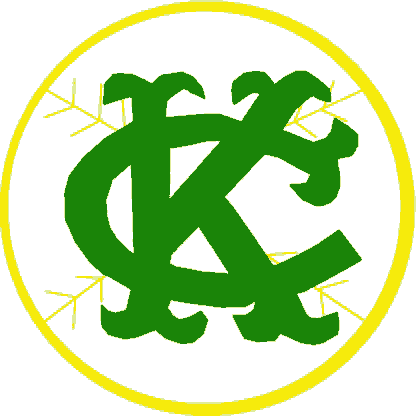
Kansas City Athletics logo 1963 to 1967

A small zoo with goats and sheep and a picnic area stood behind the right-field fence. When home runs were hit into the field, the goats and sheep would scamper up the hill. At the same time, Finley replaced the Athletics' old elephant mascot with a live mule, the state animal of Missouri, appropriately named "Charlie-O".

At home plate a mechanical rabbit, nicknamed "Harvey" in reference to the stage play Harvey (1944) and the subsequent film of the same name (1950), rose out of the ground with new baseballs for the umpire and a compressed-air device (nicknamed "Little Blowhard") blew dirt off of home plate.

Reggie Jackson, Sal Bando, Catfish Hunter, Joe Rudi and Gene Tenace were some young A's players who debuted in Kansas City and went on to lead them in their World Series victories in Oakland. Hunter and Jackson would earn Hall of Fame induction.

=== Kansas City Royals ===
Municipal Stadium's fate was sealed when, as part of the AFL–NFL merger, all teams were required to have a minimum stadium capacity of 50,000 people; at its height, Municipal Stadium only seated 35,000 people for football and could not be expanded. However, a replacement would have been needed even without the merger, given its age and condition. Public bonds were issued in 1967 to fund a complex including separate football and baseball stadiums—what would eventually become the Truman Sports Complex. It came too late for the A's, however, as Finley moved the franchise to Oakland after the 1967 season. Subsequently, Kansas City was awarded an American League expansion team for 1969, and the new Kansas City Royals used the stadium as a temporary home from 1969 to 1972. The Royals were scheduled to move out after the 1971 season, but labor strikes delayed construction of their new home, forcing them to play a fourth season at the facility. Of trivial note, Jack Layton became the Royals' public address announcer, and would move with the team to Royals Stadium, making him the only person to have worked for the Athletics and Royals during their tenures in Kansas City.

Kansas City welcomed the new Royals, who were led by 1969 American League Rookie of the Year Lou Piniella. The expansion team drew nearly one million fans in their first season, despite a 69–93 record.

In subsequent seasons, many future stars made their debuts for the Royals, who were building a highly competitive team, rising up to an 85–76 record in 1971. CF Amos Otis (1970), P Paul Splittorff (1970), SS Freddie Patek (1971), 1B John Mayberry (1972) and P Steve Busby (1972) were a core of young Royals who made their debuts at Municipal Stadium. Each went on to selection into the Royals Hall of Fame.

After the 1972 baseball season, the Royals moved to Kauffman Stadium in the Truman Sports Complex. The Royals won the final game (and event) at Municipal Stadium, a 4–0 win over the Texas Rangers on October 4, 1972, in what was also the final Major League game managed by Hall of Famer Ted Williams. Amos Otis scored the final run in Municipal Stadium history and Ed Kirkpatrick had the final hit. Four days prior Gene Tenace of the Oakland A's hit the final home run, and John Mayberry hit the final Royals home run the night before.

== American Football League/National Football League ==
=== Kansas City Chiefs ===
Franchise owner Lamar Hunt moved the Dallas Texans of the fledgling American Football League (AFL) to Kansas City after the 1962 season, becoming the Kansas City Chiefs. The stadium was retrofitted for football. The playing field ran an unconventional east–west, along the first base line. Temporary stands were erected in left field to expand the stadium's capacity each fall, but had to be removed during the baseball season. Due to the lower capacity without the temporary bleachers, the Chiefs opened almost every season between 1963 and 1971 with three or more consecutive road games, except 1968, the year in between the Athletics' final season in Kansas City and the Royals' first season.

The double-decked grandstand extended all the way across the south sideline, but ended halfway around the west end zone (third base line). Both teams' benches were on the north sideline in front of the temporary bleachers, as was the case at Wrigley Field, Tiger Stadium, Milwaukee County Stadium and Metropolitan Stadium. The east end zone ended at the right field fence, and the large scoreboard was in this end of the stadium. Due to the fence, there was significantly less room between the end line and the fence of the east end zone than there was in the west end zone, where there was a significant amount of room between the end line and the grandstand.

The Chiefs were 44–16–3 (.722) in their tenure at Municipal Stadium and had a roster of Hall of Fame players: Quarterback Len Dawson, Defensive End Buck Buchanan, defensive tackle Curley Culp, Linebackers Bobby Bell and Willie Lanier, defensive backs Emmitt Thomas and Johnny Robinson, and Kicker Jan Stenerud. Lamar Hunt himself was the first Chief elected to the Hall, as his role as a league pioneer resulted in pro football growing from 12 to 26 franchises in the 1960s. In one of the great performances at the stadium, the Chiefs' Hall of Fame Quarterback Len Dawson passed for 435 yards and 6 Touchdowns against the Denver Broncos on November 1, 1964.

While at Municipal Stadium, the Chiefs were successful, representing the American Football League in two of the four Super Bowls before the leagues merged. As AFL Champions under Coach Hank Stram, the Chiefs won Super Bowl IV, beating the Minnesota Vikings 23–7. Previously, the Chiefs played in the very first, Super Bowl I, losing to the Green Bay Packers of Vince Lombardi. Leading up to the game after Lamar Hunt had first used the term "Super Bowl" in the local media as a term for the AFL–NFL Championship Game, a phrase that was later adopted as the name. Super Bowl IV was the last game played before the merger of the AFL and NFL They moved to Arrowhead Stadium in the Truman Sports Complex for the 1972 season.

=== Longest NFL game played ===
The Chiefs' final game at Municipal Stadium was played on Christmas Day 1971 and was historic. Despite a brilliant game by the Chiefs' Ed Podolak, who had 350 total yards from scrimmage, an NFL playoff record that still stands, the Chiefs were beaten by the Dolphins 27–24, when Garo Yepremian kicked a walk-off field goal with 7:20 left in double overtime. The double-overtime playoff contest lasted 82 minutes and 40 seconds (with overtime lasting over 22 minutes) and remains the longest game in NFL history, as well the only post-season football game played at Municipal Stadium. The Chiefs were 7-0 at home during the 1971 regular season.

== North American Soccer League ==
=== Kansas City Spurs ===
The Chicago Spurs of the National Professional Soccer League (NPSL) relocated the franchise to Kansas City after the NPSL and the United Soccer Association formed the North American Soccer League (NASL) in 1967. The Spurs, under Coach Janos Bedl, led the league in attendance, with an average of 8,510 fans. Because of scheduling conflicts with Royals baseball and Chiefs football, the Spurs relocated home matches to the football stadium at The Pembroke Hill School for the 1970 season before the club folded altogether. The Spurs' colors were red and white and their mascot was "Cowboy Joe".

== Other events ==
=== 1960 Major League Baseball All Star Game ===
On July 11, 1960, Municipal Stadium hosted the best major league players in front of 30,619 fans. During the years when two major league All-Star Games were scheduled each year instead of one, Municipal Stadium hosted the first of the two 1960 games, with the National League winning the contest 5–3. Team rosters included over 15 future Hall of Fame members.

Notable players on the rosters included: Hank Aaron, Ted Williams, Mickey Mantle, Willie Mays, Roberto Clemente (His first All-Star Game), Stan Musial, Yogi Berra, Roger Maris, Whitey Ford, Brooks Robinson, Ernie Banks, Eddie Mathews, Bill Mazeroski, Al Kaline, Orlando Cepeda, Nellie Fox and Luis Aparicio.

Ernie Banks, Del Crandall and Al Kaline hit home runs in the contest.

=== 1964 Beatles concert ===
On September 17, 1964, The Beatles played the stadium as part of their first U.S. tour. The date was originally supposed to be an off-day for the band following a concert in New Orleans, but they agreed to perform when Finley offered their manager, Brian Epstein, a then-record sum of $150,000 (equivalent to $1.14 million in 2014). The group opened the Thursday night concert by saluting the host town with their medley of "Kansas City" and "Hey, Hey, Hey, Hey"; a month later, they would record the medley for their fourth studio album, Beatles for Sale.

== Demolition and the site today ==
The stadium was demolished in 1976, and replaced by a municipal garden. Today, the former ballpark site is being redeveloped with new single family homes.

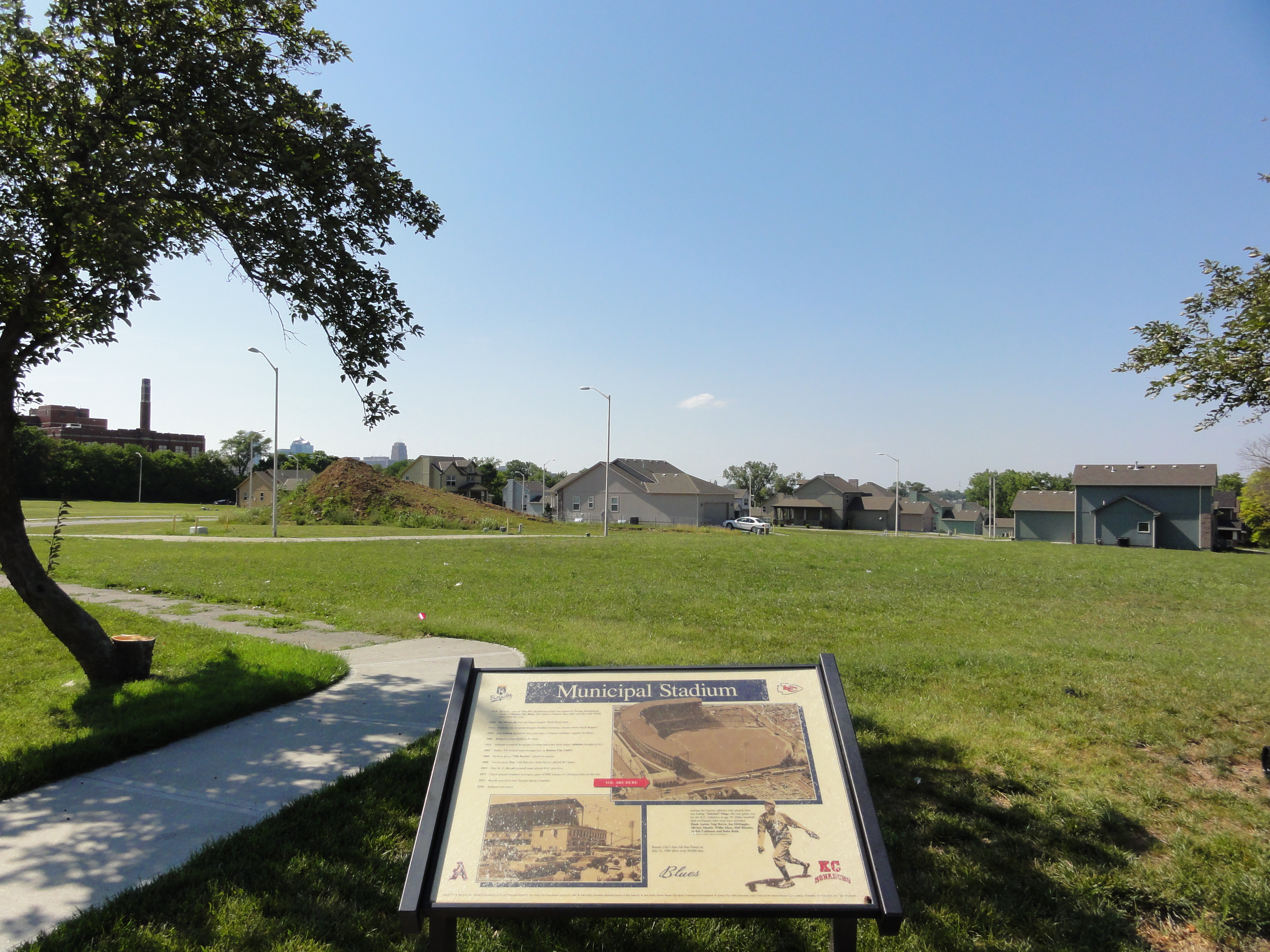
Kansas City Municipal Stadium site, 2012

A plaque at 22nd and Brooklyn Street marks the former stadium's location. The neighborhood still contains legendary Arthur Bryant's Barbecue at 18th and Brooklyn Street, founded in 1908, a fan and player favorite when Municipal Stadium was nearby.

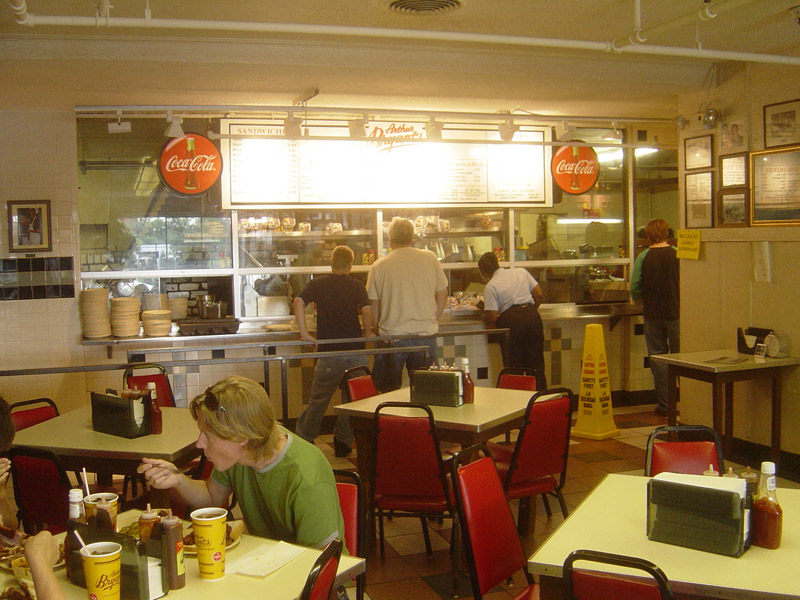
Interior of Arthur Bryant's at 18th and Brooklyn, 2006

With involvement from former Monarch Buck O'Neil, the Negro Leagues Baseball Museum was founded in 1990 and opened in 1997. Located in the 18th and Vine District, the museum is housed in the former Paseo YMCA building where the Negro leagues were first formed in 1920. The museum is alongside the American Jazz Museum. The site is within a mile of the location of Municipal Stadium.

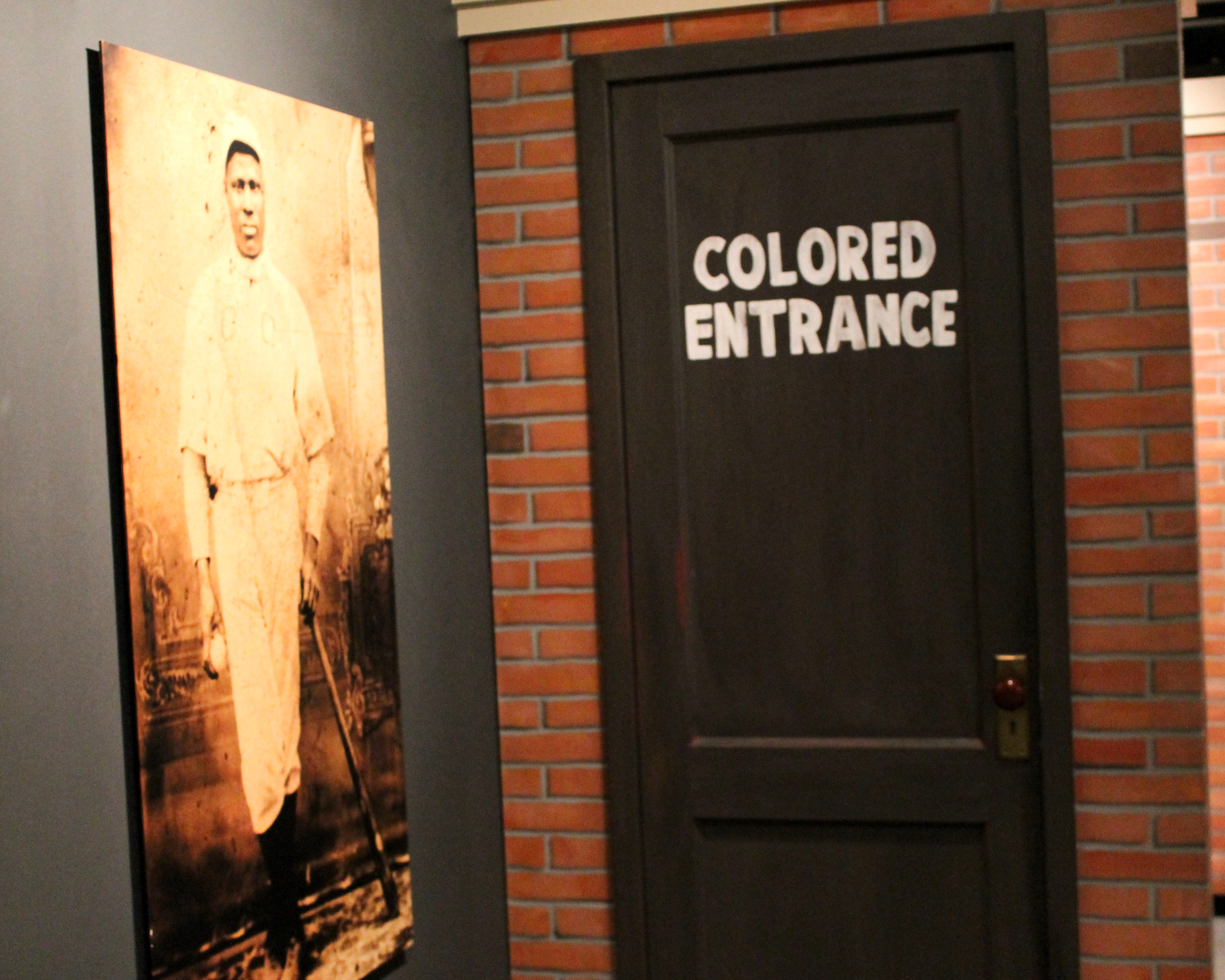
Negro league Hall of Fame exhibit 2014

== See also ==
- List of American football stadiums by capacity
- List of baseball parks in Kansas City, Missouri
- List of Major League Baseball stadiums

Events and tenants (except as noted, all venues located in Kansas City, Missouri)
Preceded by Association Park	Home of the Kansas City Blues; 1923–1954	Succeeded by last ballpark
Preceded by Association Park	Home of the Kansas City Monarchs; 1923–1954	Succeeded by last ballpark
Preceded by Shibe Park (Philadelphia)	Home of the Kansas City Athletics; 1955–1967	Succeeded by Oakland–Alameda County Coliseum (Oakland, California)
Preceded by Los Angeles Memorial Coliseum (Los Angeles)	Host of the All-Star Game; 1960 1st Game	Succeeded by Yankee Stadium (New York City)
Preceded by Cotton Bowl (Dallas)	Home of the Kansas City Chiefs; 1963–1971	Succeeded by Arrowhead Stadium
Preceded by first ballpark	Home of the Kansas City Royals; 1969–1972	Succeeded by Royals Stadium
