= Carl A. Finley =

Minority owner of the Kansas City A's

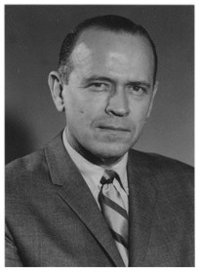
Carl A. Finley

Carl A. Finley Jr. (March 23, 1924 in Dallas, Texas – March 30, 2002) was a minority owner of the Kansas City A's.

Following three years of military service during World War II, Finley attended Southern Methodist University in his native Dallas, earning bachelor's degrees in history and journalism. This background prepared him for 13 years as a high school teacher and principal at Thomas Jefferson High School, while he started his family in his hometown.

A career change in 1962 landed Finley with the Oakland A's when he accepted a position as minority owner of the Kansas City Athletics, after being 'romanced' into this capacity by his cousin Charlie O. Finley who bought into the team in 1960.

Finley is best known as "...A's owner Charlie O. Finley's 'right-hand man' during the A’s stay in Kansas City all the way through to Finley’s sale of the team in 1980. This architect of the Oakland powerhouse teams of the 1970s was recruited by his cousin, Charlie, an insurance tycoon, from his position as a high school principal to run a professional sports franchise (with a handful of staff) for a mostly-absentee owner."

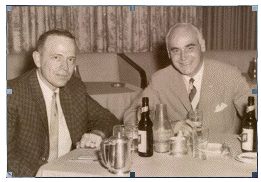
Carl A. Finley & Charlie O. Finley, 1962

Charlie O. Finley tried hard to keep the A's in Kansas City with their loyal fans, but due to outside forces, the team had no choice but to leave Kansas City in 1967. Oakland, California was the only place with a stadium ready to move into right away. The 1968 season was the team's first in Oakland, making it the city's first MLB team. With the A's move to Oakland in 1968, Carl & his daughter Nancy moved from Texas to Oakland so he could manage the business. He was a private and humble individual. In the off-season, he enjoyed teaching business law part-time at Laney College, in Oakland.

== Minority owner ==
Finley did not seek attention to himself, but he played a huge role in the success of the Oakland A's, as general manager and vice-president of operations throughout the 1970s. He was the peacekeeper of the organization. In addition to working with Charlie to build the championship teams, it was also Carl's job to implement and manage Charlie's promotional ideas, such as the bright yellow and green uniforms, orange baseballs, Harvey the mechanical rabbit, Oakland A's Promotion Days, the Finley Fireworks, Charlie the Mule, and the A's 'Rally Railroad Bell Ringer'.

Finley was the one who spoke at local organizations on behalf of the Oakland A's, dealt with players' contract reviews, and attended MLB annual owners' meetings between 1975 and 1980. He communicated regularly with the Oakland A's Minor League Division, and was a major decision-maker in bringing new talent to the majors. Charlie & Carl spoke often on the phone to make decisions - sometimes, when Charlie would fire an employee, Carl would quietly put the person back on the payroll the next day. Carl would coach Charlie on how to talk to the press. It always seemed like a reporter knew how to push one of Charlie's buttons, and make Charlie start ranting. This often resulted in angry words between Carl and Charlie.

Finley had the final say on everything on a day-to-day basis at the Coliseum. He would sign off on the A's roster every late afternoon when the team was in town. He also dealt with the media, advertisers, season ticket holders, security, etc. Whenever a fan was hit by a foul ball, he had to see that person afterward. Finley seemed to take on the duties of whatever was best suited for the occasion: vice president, general manager, director of public relations, ticket manager, operations manager, etc.

=== Tickets ===
Another big responsibility Finley supervised was the ticket sales, including ticket discounts to Oakland A's fans and the distribution of playoff and World Series tickets. During the period between 1971 and 1975, he and his daughter Nancy would personally handle every post-season ticket request order by hand, and they would disburse the tickets from a secret location each year they had a game, 1971* 1972*, 1973*, 1974* and 1975*. If assistance was needed at this top-secret location, the employee had to promise 'confidentiality'.

== World Series play-offs ==
- 1971 Oakland A's made it to the American League play-offs against the Baltimore Orioles
- 1972 Oakland A's won the World Series
- 1973 Oakland A's won the World Series
- 1974 Oakland A's won the World Series
- 1975 Oakland A's made it to the American League Play-offs against the Boston Red Sox

== After 1980 ==
1980, Charlie O. Finley sold the Oakland A's to Walter A. Haas Jr. & Roy Eisenhardt, and Carl was asked to stay on as Vice President of Baseball Operations. The 1980 Oakland A's yearbook has a picture of Carl with this statement: "...[Carl] now enjoys the longest tenure with the [A's] club. His duties now include the handling of player contracts, interpretation of administrative rules and dealing with the growing complexities of player moves that now face each Major League team."
