= Michael Crowley (baseball) =

Oakland Athletics president

- Education: University of Notre Dame, BBA Accounting; Duke University's Fuqua School of Business, MBA
- Occupation: Sports Executive
- Website: www.linkedin.com/in/michael-crowley-sv

Michael Crowley is the former president of the Oakland Athletics of Major League Baseball. He served as president of the Athletics from September 1998 until November 2016, which is the longest in Oakland Athletics’ history. He was succeeded by Dave Kaval.

A limited partner in the Athletics ownership group, Crowley was responsible for the overall day-to-day functioning of the Athletics' organization both on the business and baseball sides of the operation, working directly with former owner and managing partner Lew Wolff. Consistently in the lowest payroll tier, the franchise appeared in the playoffs eight times in 18 years while Crowley served as president.

== Soccer - San Jose Earthquakes ==
Michael Crowley directed the acquisition and operations of soccer for the Major League Soccer (MLS) franchise relaunch in the San Jose market. He served as the team’s president from the re-launch in 2007 to October 2010 and then spent seven seasons with the Earthquakes as the managing director. Crowley currently is a member of the San Jose Earthquakes Board of Directors.
