= Dave Kaval =

American baseball executive (born 1975)

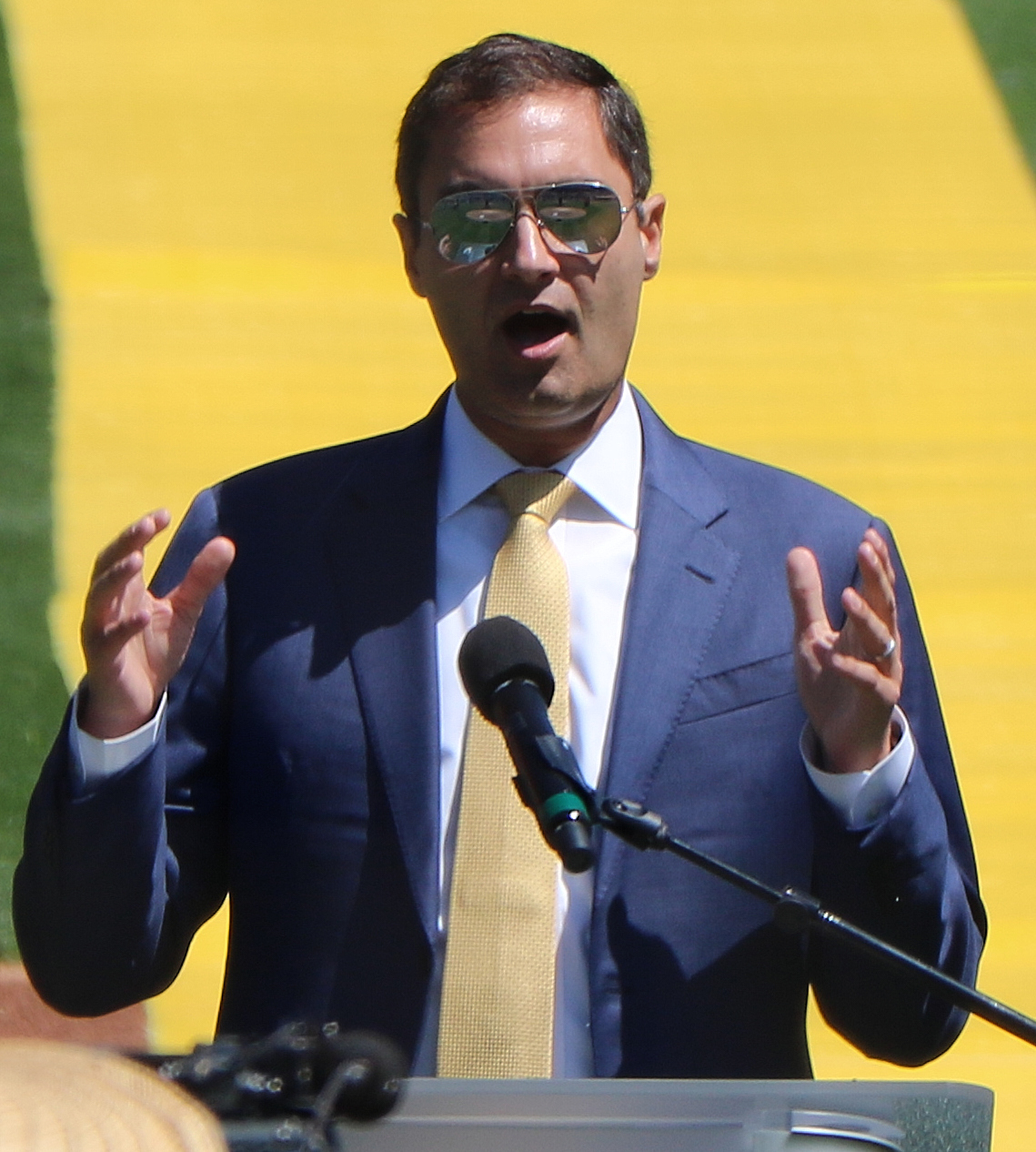
- Kaval in 2019
- Born: October 28, 1975 (age 50); Cleveland, Ohio, U.S.
- Education: Stanford University (BA 1998 and MBA 2003)
- Occupation: Sports executive
- Years active: 2003–2024
- Known for: Former President of the Athletics
- Spouse: Maria Fredricsson
- Children: 2

David A. Kaval (born October 28, 1975) is an American sports executive. He was the seventh president of the Athletics of Major League Baseball, from 2016 to 2024. He has previously served as president of Major League Soccer club San Jose Earthquakes and founded the Golden Baseball League.

== Early life and education ==
Kaval was born on October 28, 1975, to Jim and Paula Kaval. Jim, a member of the Peace Corps and real estate entrepreneur, and Paula, a realtor and school teacher, raised Kaval in Cleveland, Ohio. He is of Slovak and Italian descent. Kaval attended Stanford University and received a Bachelor of Arts in international relations in 1998. He later returned to Stanford for an MBA and did a national security budgets summer internship for the George W. Bush administration.

== Career ==
=== Early career and the Golden Baseball League ===
Following Stanford graduation, on June 20, 1998, Kaval and a former classmate began their trip to visit all 30 Major League Baseball ballparks in 38 days. The trip ultimately led to the publication of The Summer that Saved Baseball which chronicled their journey.

Kaval founded the independent Golden Baseball League in 2003 as part of a class project. The teams were run on just a $90,000 salary cap per season. In October 2010, Kaval left to become the president of Major League Soccer team San Jose Earthquakes which raised questions as to the future of the league. Those questions became answered when the league merged with two other leagues the year after Kaval's departure and ultimately ceased operations in 2012.

=== San Jose Earthquakes ===
Kaval was named president of the San Jose Earthquakes in October 2010, taking over from Michael Crowley. During his time with the Earthquakes, the team won the 2012 Supporters' Shield, but failed to make the playoffs in every other season he oversaw. Despite numerous delays, the team was able to open Earthquakes Stadium in February 2015, which was the first soccer-specific stadium for the team.

It was announced in June 2017 that Kaval was replaced as team president by Tom Fox.

=== Oakland Athletics ===
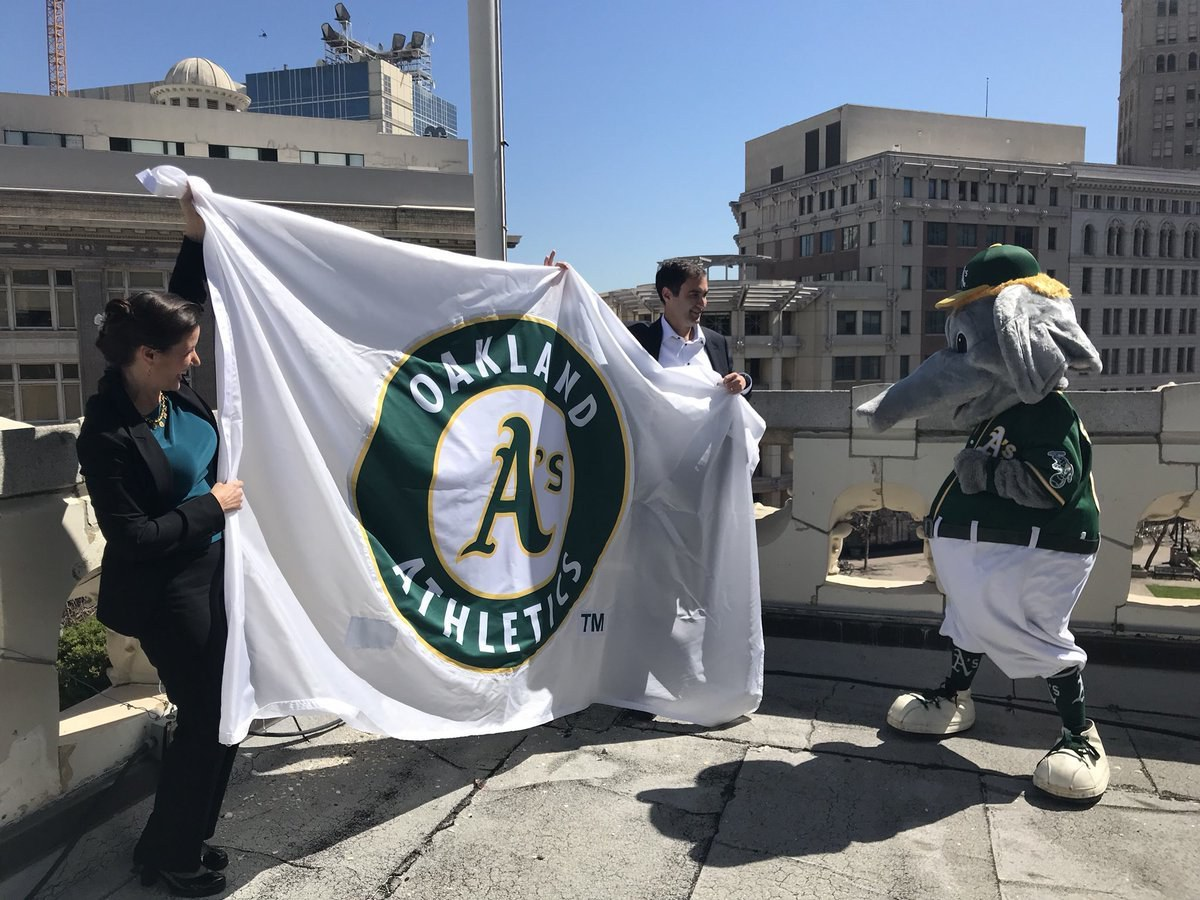
Kaval with Oakland Mayor Libby Schaaf at Oakland City Hall during the 2018 season

On November 17, 2016, Kaval was named the seventh president in Oakland Athletics history. Kaval initially made a positive impression with fans upon assuming the position when he attempted to be more open to fans through scheduled meeting times, a tactic he previously employed with the San Jose Earthquakes. The A's also made fan and capital improvements to the Oakland Coliseum such as removing tarps which covered the Coliseum's third deck, creating a food truck rally with outdoor games, and investing $1M in upgrades to an all-access club called Shibe Park Tavern. Kaval's COO, Chris Giles, also spearheaded a membership campaign, "A's Access", which granted members with benefits that surpassed that of previous season ticket holders.

==== New ballpark efforts ====
Kaval sought a new stadium for the Oakland A's. In September 2017, Kaval announced that the A's had selected site near downtown Oakland owned by the Peralta Community College District as their desired location after considering the current Coliseum site and a Howard Terminal site at the Port of Oakland. The selection was immediately met with local opposition from students, teachers, and the nearby communities of Chinatown and Eastlake. The selection was also brought concern from Oakland mayor Libby Schaaf and former mayor Ron Dellums as the move would have displaced low-income and immigrant families and businesses from the surrounding area. Despite the concerns, Kaval attempted to move forward with the site and targeted an opening during the 2023 Major League Baseball season. In December 2017, the Peralta Community College District board turned down the A's proposal, leaving Kaval to backtrack to his lesser preferred locations.

Nearly a year after the Peralta site rejection, Kaval and the A's announced the Howard Terminal site at the Port of Oakland as their primary focus in November 2018. Concerns and community opposition to the project was voiced primarily from the maritime industry, but also saw transportation and environmental groups become vocal about the site choice. Kaval progressed the project and on July 20, 2021, the Oakland City Council voted 6-1 (with one abstain vote) to approve a non-binding term sheet to continue negotiations with the A's for the new ballpark. However, Kaval said that the team did not agree to those terms since it was not the term sheet the team provided. Subsequently, on April 20, 2023, it was reported that the Athletics had purchased a parcel of land from Red Rock Casino, Resort & Spa for a new stadium in Las Vegas, near the Las Vegas Strip; subsequently, Oakland mayor Sheng Thao announced the cessation of negotiations with the team regarding the Howard Terminal site, effectively ending the proposed ballpark project.

After the Las Vegas Stadium Authority approved lease, non-relocation and development documents for the New Las Vegas Stadium and the Athletics' relocation to Las Vegas, Kaval announced his resignation from the team.

== Personal life ==
Kaval is married to Maria Fredricsson, whom he met his first day at Stanford. Kaval is a resident of Menlo Park, California, where the couple has raised their two daughters.
