= Charlie-O (mascot) =

American baseball mascot

Charlie-O the Mule
- Team: Kansas City / Oakland A's
- Description: Mule
- Origin of name: Named after team owner Charles O. Finley

Charlie-O the Mule was the mascot used by the Major League Baseball teams Kansas City / Oakland A's from 1965 to 1976. Charlie-O the Mule was purchased from Harold Sloan, a small town farmer and muleskinner from Osborn, Missouri. The mule was named after Charles O. Finley, the team's owner at the time.

The team's original mascot was an elephant, dating from the early years of the franchise when it was located in Philadelphia, Pennsylvania. The team’s first ownership group was headed by industrialist Benjamin Shibe. When asked to comment, John McGraw, manager of the New York Giants of the rival National League said something to the effect that Shibe had bought himself a "white elephant." In response, A's manager (and future owner) Connie Mack selected the elephant as the team symbol and mascot, and from time to time, the elephant has appeared on the Athletics’ uniforms ever since.

When the A's moved to Missouri, where the official state animal is the mule, Warren Hearnes gave a mule to Finley for his barnyard menagerie at Municipal Stadium, which also included sheep and goats that scampered up the hill behind right field. The Municipal Stadium menagerie also included Warpaint, the horse mascot of the Kansas City Chiefs. As questions swirled about whether Finley would be loyal to Missouri, he embraced the mule, removed the elephant from the A's logo, and changed the team’s colors from blue, red and white to green, gold, and white.

Finley took the sorrel 15 hands (60 inches, 152 cm) mule around the country, walking him into cocktail parties and hotel lobbies, and on one occasion even into the press room after a large feeding to annoy reporters. After an announcement that Finley intended to ride him around the bases at Dodger Stadium, a reporter wrote:

You can't tell the owner without a program.

In 1965, the A's briefly had relief pitchers ride the mule from the bullpen to the pitcher's mound when entering a game.

When the Athletics left Kansas City after the 1967 season, there was debate about whether Charlie-O should stay, but Finley declared he was a gift and took him with him to Oakland in 1968. The mule died in 1976 at age 20. When Finley sold the team to San Francisco businessman Walter A. Haas, Jr. in 1981, the use of a mule as team mascot was discontinued. Then, in 1988, the elephant was resurrected as team mascot, eventually personified by Stomper.

Charlie-O appeared at two Oakland Athletics games in 2010, first in Oakland for a Turn Back the Clock game on June 26 and again in Kansas City for the Kansas City Royals’ Turn Back the Clock game against the Athletics on July 17.

== See also ==
- List of Major League Baseball mascots
