= Charlie Finley =

American businessman (1918–1996)

- Born: Charles Oscar Finley; February 22, 1918; Ensley, Alabama, U.S.
- Died: February 19, 1996 (aged 77); Chicago, Illinois, U.S.
- Occupations: Baseball franchise owner and executive
- Years active: December 1960–August 1980
- Known for: Owner of the Kansas City / Oakland A's

Charles Oscar Finley (February 22, 1918 – February 19, 1996), nicknamed "Charlie O" or "Charley O", was an American businessman who owned Major League Baseball's Oakland Athletics. Finley purchased the franchise while it was located in Kansas City, moving it to Oakland in 1968. He is also known as a short-lived owner of the National Hockey League's California Golden Seals and the American Basketball Association's Memphis Tams.

== Early life ==
Finley was born in Ensley, Birmingham, Alabama, attended Ensley High School but was further raised in Gary, Indiana, and later lived in La Porte, 60 miles (100 km) east of Chicago. Finley made his fortune in the insurance business, being among the first to write group medical insurance policies for those in the medical profession.

Finley showed a penchant for flair and inventive business practices. Sometimes, when wooing prospective customers, Finley would drive the client through the richest section of Gary. Pointing out a large mansion, Finley would declare "That's my place there, but I'm having it remodeled right now." Finley's fortunes grew and he ended up owning a 40-story insurance building in downtown Chicago. In 1956, Charles Finley purchased a home built in 1942 on Johnson Road just north of Pine Lake in LaPorte, Indiana. He hired John Mihelic as his ranch caretaker. The property was a working cattle ranch which consisted of an 18th-century, eleven-room colonial manor house and nine barns with various outbuildings. Finley had a large mansion built on the property, keeping the colonial house as caretakers quarters. The new house, which featured rounded porticoes and columns, resembled the White House.

Finley had a large "Home of the Oakland A's" sign installed on the roof of another large barn where it could be viewed by vehicles passing on the Indiana toll road. It was to this place that Finley often brought the whole team and held picnics and pool parties attended by friends, business associates, and locals, who mingled with members of the team and took numerous photographs.

In 1941, Finley married the former Shirley McCartney. They had eight children before the marriage ended in a bitter divorce, the proceedings of which lasted 6 years. The Finleys separated in 1974, and according to a biographer, Finley was unfaithful during his marriage and frequently estranged both his friends and family. Shirley Finley won a massive divorce settlement. Finley was estranged from most of his children at the time of his death. Finley died three days shy of his 78th birthday. His former wife, who remarried, died in 2010.

== Owner of the A's ==
=== In Kansas City ===
Finley entered the ranks of Major League Baseball owners after multiple failed attempts to acquire franchises during the 1950s.

He first attempted to buy the Philadelphia Athletics in 1954, but American League owners instead approved the sale of the team to Arnold Johnson, who moved the club to Kansas City for the 1955 season.

In 1956, Finley unsuccessfully bid for the Detroit Tigers, who instead were sold to a Michigan-based group led by broadcasting magnates John Fetzer and Fred Knorr. In 1959, when Dorothy Comiskey Rigney put her majority holdings in the Chicago White Sox up for sale, Finley lost out to a group headed by Bill Veeck. Then, one year later, he was among a group of contenders for the American League expansion franchise earmarked for Los Angeles, but actor, singer and broadcasting tycoon Gene Autry ended up as the founding principal owner of the Angels.

Fate, however, would play a role in Finley's fifth, and ultimately successful, attempt to enter baseball — and it would come from his 1954 target, now the Kansas City Athletics. On March 3, 1960, owner Arnold Johnson died suddenly and unexpectedly from a cerebral hemorrhage at the age of 54. The second-division Athletics struggled through a last-place season while being operated by Johnson's estate. Just weeks after Finley lost his bid for the Angels' franchise, on December 19, 1960, he purchased the estate's controlling interest in the Athletics; he then bought out the minority owners a year later. Finley quickly started to turn the franchise around, refusing to make deals with the New York Yankees (for which the Athletics had been criticized) and searching for unheralded talent. From 1961 onward, Finley was effectively his own general manager, though the A's nominally had someone who had the title or duties of general manager until 1966.

Finley also repeatedly tried to move the team. In January 1964 he reached an agreement with Louisville, to move the team there for the 1964 season, signing a two-year lease on a stadium. When that proposed move was blocked by the American League he entertained offers from Denver and San Diego

==== Charlie-O becomes the Athletics' mascot ====
Finley replaced the Athletics' traditional elephant mascot with a live mule. "Charlie-O" was paraded about the outfield, into cocktail parties and hotel lobbies and into the press room after a large feeding to annoy reporters. (The mule died in 1976, at age 20.)

==== The "K.C. Pennant Porch" ====
After supposedly being told by manager Ed Lopat about the Yankees' success being attributable to the dimensions of Yankee Stadium, Finley built the "K.C. Pennant Porch" in right field in April 1964, which brought the right field fence in Municipal Stadium to match Yankee Stadium's dimensions exactly, just 296 feet (90 m) from home plate. However, a rule passed in 1958 held that no (new or renovated) major-league fence could be closer than 325 feet (99 m), so league officials forced Finley to move the fences back after two exhibition games.

The A's owner then ordered a white line to be painted on the field at the original "Pennant Porch" distance, and told the public address announcer to announce "That would have been a home run in Yankee Stadium" whenever a fly ball was hit past that line but short of the fence. The practice was quickly abandoned after it turned out that the announcer was calling more "would-be" home runs for the opposition than the A's.

==== Uniform changes ====
In 1963, Finley changed the team's colors to Kelly Green, Fort Knox Gold, and Wedding Gown White. In 1967, he replaced the team's traditional black spikes with white. Finley also started phasing out the team name "Athletics" in favor of "A's." (When Mickey Mantle saw the A's' green-and-gold uniforms, he jeered, "They should have come out of the dugout on tippy-toes, holding hands and singing," according to Baseball Digest.)

==== The Beatles ====
When the Beatles made their August/September 1964 concert tour of the United States, Finley was determined to bring them to Kansas City to perform at Municipal Stadium. Seeing one open date on the tour, Finley offered and paid the Beatles $150,000 ($1,557.1 million+ today) for a concert on September 17, 1964, erasing a scheduled off day for the band in New Orleans. The tickets read: "CHARLES O. FINLEY/ IS PLEASED TO PRESENT..FOR THE ENJOYMENT/ OF THE BEATLE FANS IN MID-AMERICA/ 'THE BEATLES'/ IN PERSON” on the front, and showed a photograph of Finley wearing a Beatles wig on the back with the quote, "Today's Beatle's (sic) Fans/ Are/ Tomorrow's Baseball Fans." John Lennon was quoted later as saying he disliked Finley's attempt to strong-arm the Beatles into playing longer than their then-standard half-hour concert set. The Beatles' $150,000 fee for the concert was considered a show business record for a one-night stand appearance.

Finley visited the group's manager, Brian Epstein, in San Francisco on August 19, 1964, where the Beatles were playing the first date of the tour. He told Epstein that he was disappointed that Kansas City was not among the group's itinerary, and offered first $50,000 and then $100,000 if the Beatles would schedule a concert in the Missouri city. Epstein refused, pointing out that on the only free date available, September 17, the band was scheduled for a day of rest in New Orleans. Finley encountered Epstein again in Los Angeles a week later and they agreed on $150,000.

=== In Oakland ===
==== World Series success ====
The A's (as they were officially known from 1970) moved to California in January 1968, just as the new talent amassed over the years in the minors (such as Reggie Jackson, Sal Bando, Joe Rudi, Bert Campaneris, Catfish Hunter, Rollie Fingers, and Vida Blue) became ready for the Majors. Marvin Miller, the founder of MLB's players union, called Finley "absolutely the best judge of baseball talent I've ever seen."

During the early 1970s, the once-moribund A's became a "Swingin' A's" powerhouse, winning three straight World Series from 1972 to 1974 and five straight division titles from 1971 to 1975, in the Oakland Coliseum. He was named The Sporting News Sportsman of the Year in 1972. Though he no longer owned the team when the A's won the World Series again in 1989, Tony La Russa, who managed that team, and outfielder Rickey Henderson were originally scouted by Finley.

==== The beginning of free agency ====
In 1974, after winning a third straight World Series championship, Finley lost ace pitcher Jim 'Catfish' Hunter to free agency as a result of a contract clause violation. The A's still managed to dominate throughout the 1975 regular season without Hunter, but were swept by Boston in the playoffs. With free agency looming at the end of the 1976 season, Finley began dismantling the ball club. Reggie Jackson and Ken Holtzman were traded to Baltimore a week prior to the start of the 1976 season. Finley attempted to sell Rudi and Fingers to the Red Sox for $1 million each and Blue to the Yankees for $1.5 million, at which Major League Baseball commissioner Bowie Kuhn decided to invoke the rarely used "best interests of baseball" clause in order to void Finley's sales. Finley, in turn, hired famed sports attorney Neil Papiano and proceeded to file a $10 million restraint-of-trade lawsuit against Kuhn and Major League Baseball. Papiano and Finley lost the case (see Finley v. Kuhn). The court ruled that the commissioner had the authority to determine what is in the best interests of baseball. This lawsuit is widely recognized as one of the most famous, influential, and precedent-setting sports-related cases in the history of U.S. jurisprudence.

By the end of the 1976 season, most of the A's stars had left the team as free agents. The few remaining stars from the A's dynasty years were traded away, with the exceptions of Vida Blue and Billy North. There was much bad blood between the ace and his owner. Going back to 1971 when Vida Blue first joined the As, and had a legendary 24-8 rookie season, he earned $14,000. That winter, Blue sought a $92,500 salary, held out, missed much of the 1972 season, before Blue and Finley settled at $63,000. Later, in 1976, after an 18–13 season with a 2.35 ERA, Blue told reporters, "I hope the next breath Charlie Finley takes is his last. I hope he falls flat on his face and dies of polio." Blue's curse seemed to strike home, as in the 1977, only two years after winning a fifth straight division title and three years after winning a third consecutive World Series, the A's finished in last place in their division, with one of the worst records in baseball. After the 1977 season, Finley tried to sell Blue again, this time to the Cincinnati Reds. Kuhn vetoed this trade as well, saying that it amounted to a fire sale. Kuhn also claimed that the addition of Blue to an already formidable Reds pitching staff would make a mockery of the National League West race.

==== Selling the A's ====
Finley and his "right-hand man," cousin Carl A. Finley, started scouting for new talent in 1977. The Finleys brought in future stars such as Rickey Henderson, Tony Armas, Mitchell Page, Mike Norris, and Dwayne Murphy to rebuild the team. It was not until 1980 that the A's showed signs of improvement, under manager and Berkeley native Billy Martin. However, after that season, Finley's wife divorced him and would not accept an interest in the A's as part of a settlement. With most of the Finleys' assets invested in either Charlie O's insurance interests or the A's, the Finleys were forced to sell the team to fund the settlement.

In 1980, Finley agreed in principle to sell to businessman Marvin Davis, who planned to move the Athletics to Denver. However, just before Finley and Davis were due to sign a contract, the NFL's Oakland Raiders announced they were moving to Los Angeles in 1982. Oakland and Alameda County officials, not wanting to be held responsible for losing Oakland's status as a big-league city in its own right, refused to let the A's out of their lease with the Coliseum. Forced to turn to local buyers, Finley agreed to sell the A's to Walter A. Haas, Jr., president of Levi Strauss & Co., in August 1980 for $12.7 million, with the deal finalized before the 1981 season. Carl Finley was asked to remain with the new owners as vice president/mentor. Under new management, the A's made the playoffs in 1981.

==== Marketing ====
The Finley management was very effective at marketing. They changed the team uniforms to green and gold with white shoes and they gave some players colorful nicknames. The Finley organization introduced ball girls (one of whom, the future Debbi Fields, went on to found Mrs. Fields' Original Cookies, Inc.), and advocated night games for the World Series to increase the ability for fans to attend. Finley also was an outspoken advocate of the designated hitter rule, which he advocated until it was adopted by the American League. They were always full of new ideas, including:

- Orange baseballs – Tried in a few exhibition games, but hitters found it too hard to pick up the spin. The week of August 18, 1975, Charlie Finley was on the cover of Time magazine and his orange baseballs were featured in the article.
- A mechanical rabbit that would pop up behind home plate and deliver new balls to the umpire and was named "Harvey," at the A's home ballparks in Kansas City and Oakland.
- Hired Stanley Burrell (who would later gain worldwide fame as MC Hammer) as executive vice president when he was just a teenager to be his "eyes and ears."
- Offering players $300 bonuses to grow moustaches during the 1972 baseball season. For star relief pitcher Rollie Fingers, the handlebar moustache he grew for Finley became a trademark.

Despite his reputation as a master promoter, Finley had less success marketing his team. According to baseball writer Rob Neyer, a Kansas City native, Finley thought he could sell a baseball team like he sold insurance. Soon after buying the A's, he sent out 600,000 brochures to area residents and only netted $20,000 in sales. While in Oakland, the A's rarely had radio and television contracts, and were practically invisible even in the Bay Area. For the first month of the 1978 season, the A's radio flagship was KALX, the 10-watt college radio station of the University of California, Berkeley. A year later, the A's didn't sign a radio contract until the day before Opening Day. Largely as a result, the A's never drew well even in their championship years, and were even sued by the city of Oakland and Alameda County in 1979.

The A's have recently held promotional days with throwback uniforms from the Finley years, and have invited former players and play-by-play announcer Monte Moore to attend.

== Other sports ventures ==
Finley purchased the Oakland Seals of the National Hockey League in 1970, renaming the team California Golden Seals. Mimicking the A's, he changed the team colors to green and gold and had the Seals wear white skates instead of the traditional black skates, a move deeply unpopular with both players and fans.

In 1970, Finley also purchased the Memphis Pros of the American Basketball Association, changing the team's name to the Memphis Tams, the name being an acronym for Tennessee, Arkansas and Mississippi. As was the case with the A's, he changed the Tams' colors to green and gold. He hired recently retired Kentucky Wildcats basketball coach Adolph Rupp as team president. Finley ran it on a shoestring budget. After the first season, he sold the teams and returned to baseball.

In March 1987, Finley proposed a new football league. The league would merge with the Canadian Football League and be renamed the North American Football League. The American cities would be made up of those that lost out on the United States Football League folding, with Finley representing Chicago; the USFL's Arizona Outlaws had already come out in support of the idea of playing in the CFL as an American team, as had certain executives with the Memphis Showboats. The CFL insisted upon a minimum $20 million per year television contract to even consider the idea, and though Finley was optimistic that such a contract could be secured, networks all rejected the plan, and the CFL Commissioner at the time, Douglas Mitchell, explicitly ruled out adding teams from the United States or changing the CFL's format.

== Later life ==
Finley lived his final years on his farm in LaPorte. He died at age 77 on February 19, 1996, three days before his 78th birthday. He had suffered from heart disease and had been admitted two weeks earlier to Northwestern Memorial Hospital in Chicago.
