= First division (baseball) =

Baseball terminology pertaining to standings in a league

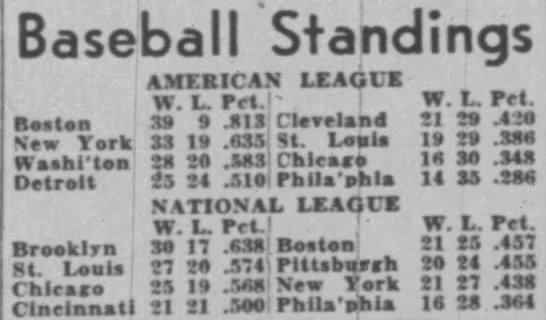
Standings in Major League Baseball (MLB) as published on June 10, 1946, showing the then-eight teams in each league divided into a first division (teams on the left) and a second division (teams on the right).

First division and second division are terms in the sport of baseball referring to rankings within a league. Teams ranked in the top half of the league standings table (e.g. the top four teams in an eight-team league) are said to be in the "first division", while teams in the bottom half of the standings are said to be in the "second division".

The term was once closely associated with Major League Baseball (MLB). However, since the introduction of a divisional structure by MLB in 1969, usage of the term is now uncommon.

Within MLB, the New York Yankees finished in the first division for a record 39 consecutive seasons (1926–1964) while, by comparison, the Chicago Cubs once finished in the second division for 20 seasons in a row (1947–1966).

== MLB Players' Pool ==
In MLB before 1969—the establishment of divisions within each league—players on teams finishing in the first division received monetary shares from the Players' Pool, which was funded by gate receipts from that year's World Series. The team winning the World Series received 42% of this money, the team losing the World Series got 28%, and the second-, third- and fourth-place teams in each league were awarded 7.5%, 5% and 2.5%, respectively.

With the realignment of both leagues into two geographically based divisions in 1969, the terms "first division" and "second division" quickly fell into disuse—largely because the word "division" had acquired a completely different meaning—although teams finishing in the top half of the standings (the first three teams in each of the new divisions) continued to share in the Players' Pool.

The distribution of the Players' Pool money was also changed with the introduction of divisional play, with the World Series winner henceforth getting 36% of the pool, its loser 27%, the losers of the League Championship Series 12.5% each, the second-place teams in the divisions 2.375% each, and the third-place teams .625% each. In 1991, these shares were revised to 36%, 24%, 12%, 3% and 1% respectively, and when both major leagues realigned again in 1995 (each league now consisting of three divisions, the winners thereof plus one wild card team in each league reaching the postseason), the 3% shares went to teams losing in the Division Series and the 1% shares went to the teams that finished second in their division but did not earn a wild card.
