= Arnold Johnson (industrialist) =

American businessperson (1906–1960)

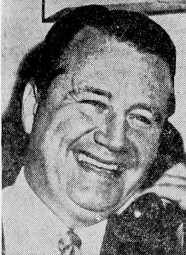
- Johnson c. 1954
- Born: Arnold M. Johnson; January 11, 1906; Chicago, Illinois, U.S.
- Died: March 3, 1960 (aged 54); West Palm Beach, Florida, U.S.
- Education: University of Chicago
- Occupations: Industrialist, businessman
- Children: 2

Arnold M. Johnson (January 11, 1906 in Chicago, Illinois – March 3, 1960 in West Palm Beach, Florida) was an American industrialist, businessman and sportsman, who purchased the Philadelphia Athletics baseball club and moved it to Kansas City, Missouri in the autumn of 1954. He had a son, Jeffery and a daughter, Wendy.

A native of Chicago and graduate of the University of Chicago, Johnson enjoyed a highly successful business career. He was a stockbroker and banker, served on the board of directors of a number of corporations, and invested in the Chicago Black Hawks of the National Hockey League.

== Buying, and moving, the Philadelphia Athletics ==
In December 1953, Johnson entered baseball through a real estate transaction by purchasing the top two playing venues of the perennial champion New York Yankees — Yankee Stadium in the Bronx, and Blues Stadium in Kansas City, home of the Yanks' top farm club, the Kansas City Blues. Concurrently, struggling major league baseball teams—especially "second" teams in two-team cities—were abandoning their old homes. Spurred by Kansas City officials, Johnson decided to bring a major league team to town, and found a target in the Philadelphia Athletics.

The Athletics of Connie Mack had once been one of the pillars of the American League, with nine pennants and five World Series wins to their credit; however, the team's chronic failures on the field since the early 1930s and its lack of resources undermined it. Most seriously, Mack either could not or would not spend money on building a farm system. In the 1940s, two fatal blows were struck.

First, in 1942, the Phillies of the National League were bought by lumber baron William D. Cox. The Phillies had long been the definition of baseball futility (they had only one winning season from 1918 to 1948), in part because their owners either did not or could not spend the money it took to build a winner. They had played at Shibe Park as tenants of the A's since 1938. When Cox bought the Phillies, in the midst of World War II, he began to spend money on signing young players; like the A's, the Phillies had not had a competitive farm system for most of their history. Cox was forced out after one year for betting on his own team, but his successor as owner, DuPont heir Bob Carpenter, began building out a farm system, hired Herb Pennock as general manager, and also begun spending lavishly on young prospects. Many of these young players helped the once-moribund Phillies win their second-ever National League pennant in 1950. For most of the first half of the 20th century, Philadelphia had been an "A's town", even though the Athletics had fielded teams as bad or worse than the Phillies for a decade. However, in 1946 the Phillies began outdrawing the A's, and in 1949 permanently surpassed them as Philadelphia's favorite team. This culminated in 1950, when the A's crumbled to the worst record in baseball while the Phillies' "Whiz Kids" won the pennant.

Second, the franchise was enveloped in a power struggle between two branches of the Mack family—essentially, Roy and Earle, Mack's two sons from his first marriage, were ranged against Connie's second wife and their son from that union, Connie Jr. Roy and Earle were unwilling to depart from their family's bargain-basement approach to running the team, and dismissed their half-brother's proposed innovations almost out of hand. Connie Jr. then made an alliance with the heirs of franchise co-founder Benjamin Shibe, and began taking steps to upgrade the team and the park. One of the few things on which the two factions agreed was that it was time for Connie Sr. to step down as manager; the three brothers persuaded their father to retire at the end of the season though he nominally remained team president. Matters came to a head when Connie Jr. and the Shibes decided to sell the team, only for Roy and Earle to end the struggle by buying out their half-brother and the Shibes in July. However, to do so, they mortgaged the team to Connecticut General Life Insurance Company (now part of CIGNA) and pledged Shibe Park as collateral. As the A's languished at the bottom of the standings, attendance dwindled, depriving the team of badly needed revenue that could have serviced the debt. By 1954, the once-proud team was close to bankruptcy. The Macks were all but forced to put the team up for sale.

== Tenure in Kansas City ==
Johnson formally made an offer to buy the A's in August 1954, with the strong support of the Yankees. Connie Sr. and Earle were receptive, but Roy, now operating head of the team (Connie Sr. had largely withdrawn from day-to-day operations, while Earle was largely indifferent) wanted to buy out his father and brother and become sole owner of the franchise. League president Will Harridge and the other owners saw no path forward for the A's in Philadelphia, but were willing to give Roy a chance to buy the team himself at a September 28 owners meeting. However, at another owners meeting on October 12, Roy revealed his efforts to raise the money needed to buy the team had failed. Under pressure from Harridge and the other owners, Roy agreed to sell the team to Johnson no later than October 18. A day before the deadline, however, Roy agreed to an eleventh-hour "save the A's" deal from a group of Philadelphia businessmen. That deal, however, imploded due to rumors (reportedly planted by the Yankees) that it was underfinanced. At the same time, Johnson persuaded Roy Mack that his deal was better in the long run, leading Roy to vote against the very deal he had negotiated. Finally, Johnson persuaded the Macks to sell him the A's for $3.5 million – $1.5 million for the Macks' stock and $2 million in debt. The deal nominally included Shibe Park–or Connie Mack Stadium, as it had been renamed in 1953–but Johnson had no interest in keeping it. Phillies owner Carpenter didn't want the park either, but reluctantly bought the park from Johnson for $1.6 million when it became clear there was no other facility in the Delaware Valley fit for even temporary use.

The deal was approved by American League owners on November 28. Johnson's first act was to request permission to move to Kansas City. While selling the team only required support from five of the eight league owners, relocation required a supermajority of six votes. Cleveland's Myron Wilson, Detroit's Spike Briggs and Washington's Clark Griffith had all opposed the sale because they knew Johnson had no intention of keeping the team in Philadelphia. However, Johnson persuaded Briggs to switch his vote, clearing the way for Johnson to move the team. In part to resolve the ensuing conflict of interest, he sold Yankee Stadium back to the Yankees as soon as the deal closed. He then sold Blues Stadium to the city, which renamed it Municipal Stadium and almost completely rebuilt the facility to bring it up to major league standards.

Johnson then signed a lease with the city which contained a three-year escape clause allowing the A's to break the terms of the lease if attendance dropped below one million. Rumors swirled Johnson intended to keep the team in Kansas City for only a few years before moving it to Los Angeles. However, those were mooted when the Brooklyn Dodgers moved there.

The team drew 1,393,054 fans in 1955, its first year in Kansas City—the third-highest figure in baseball (behind only the Yankees and Milwaukee Braves) even as they finished in sixth place with a record of 63–91. The A's never approached their 1955 attendance figures again, in large part due to a team that was barely competitive and never finished with a winning record over thirteen seasons in Kansas City. During Johnson's five years as owner, the Athletics' best record was in 1958, when they finished 73–81, 19 games out of first.

Rumors abounded almost as soon as the ink dried on the purchase where there had been massive collusion between Johnson and the Yankees, especially when the Yankees opted not to force Johnson to pay them an indemnity for moving the Athletics. Under major-league rules of the time, by virtue of owning the Blues, the Yankees also owned the major league rights to Kansas City. Those claims grew louder with a series of trades between the Yankees and A's. With few exceptions, these trades were heavily slanted in favor of the Yankees, with the A's getting very little in return. For example, ten players from the 1961 Yankees, reckoned as one of the best teams of all time, came from the A's. The trades led fans and other teams to accuse the A's of being little more than a Yankee farm team at the major league level. Bill Veeck, for instance, recalled that under Johnson, the A's were "nothing more than a loosely controlled Yankee farm club."

On March 3, 1960, Johnson was returning from watching the Athletics in spring training when he was fatally stricken with a cerebral hemorrhage. He died at Good Samaritan Hospital in West Palm Beach, Florida, later that day at the age of 54. Later that season, his estate sold its controlling interest in the team to medical insurance executive Charles O. Finley, who moved the A's to Oakland and assembled a sports dynasty there in the early 1970s.
