= 1929 Boston Red Sox season =

Major League Baseball season

1929 Boston Red Sox
- League: American League
- Ballpark: Fenway Park
- City: Boston, Massachusetts
- Record: 58–96 (.377)
- League place: 8th
- Owners: J. A. Robert Quinn
- Managers: Bill Carrigan
- Radio: WNAC (Fred Hoey)
- Stats: ESPN.com; Baseball Reference

The 1929 Boston Red Sox season was the 29th season in the franchise's Major League Baseball history. The Red Sox finished last in the eight-team American League (AL) with a record of 58 wins and 96 losses, 48 games behind the Philadelphia Athletics, who went on to win the 1929 World Series.

Prior to the season, both the Red Sox and the Boston Braves received permission from the City of Boston to play home games on Sundays. While the Red Sox normally played their home games at Fenway Park, Sunday home games were played at Braves Field, as Fenway was close to a house of worship. The first organized baseball game played in Boston on a Sunday was a preseason exhibition on April 14, 1929, with the Braves beating the Red Sox at Braves Field, 4–0. The first major league regular season game played in Boston on a Sunday was on April 28, 1929, with the Philadelphia Athletics defeating the Red Sox at Braves Field, 7–3. The Red Sox played a total of 17 home games at Braves Field during the 1929 season; 15 games on Sundays, and a doubleheader on September 2, Labor Day Monday. The first game of that doubleheader is notable for Joe Cronin hitting for the cycle.

== Regular season ==
=== Season standings ===
American League
| Team | W | L | Pct. | GB | Home | Road |
|---|---|---|---|---|---|---|
| Philadelphia Athletics | 104 | 46 | .693 | — | 57‍–‍16 | 47‍–‍30 |
| New York Yankees | 88 | 66 | .571 | 18 | 49‍–‍28 | 39‍–‍38 |
| Cleveland Indians | 81 | 71 | .533 | 24 | 44‍–‍32 | 37‍–‍39 |
| St. Louis Browns | 79 | 73 | .520 | 26 | 41‍–‍36 | 38‍–‍37 |
| Washington Senators | 71 | 81 | .467 | 34 | 37‍–‍40 | 34‍–‍41 |
| Detroit Tigers | 70 | 84 | .455 | 36 | 38‍–‍39 | 32‍–‍45 |
| Chicago White Sox | 59 | 93 | .388 | 46 | 35‍–‍41 | 24‍–‍52 |
| Boston Red Sox | 58 | 96 | .377 | 48 | 32‍–‍45 | 26‍–‍51 |

=== Record vs. opponents ===
1929 American League record Sources:
| Team | BOS | CWS | CLE | DET | NYY | PHA | SLB | WSH |
|---|---|---|---|---|---|---|---|---|
| Boston | — | 11–11 | 9–13 | 8–14 | 5–17 | 4–18 | 11–11–1 | 10–12 |
| Chicago | 11–11 | — | 9–12 | 10–12 | 6–16 | 9–13 | 4–17 | 10–12 |
| Cleveland | 13–9 | 12–9 | — | 11–11 | 14–8 | 7–14 | 10–12 | 14–8 |
| Detroit | 14–8 | 12–10 | 11–11 | — | 9–13 | 4–18 | 10–12 | 10–12–1 |
| New York | 17–5 | 16–6 | 8–14 | 13–9 | — | 8–14 | 14–8 | 12–10 |
| Philadelphia | 18–4 | 13–9 | 14–7 | 18–4 | 14–8 | — | 11–10–1 | 16–4 |
| St. Louis | 11–11–1 | 17–4 | 12–10 | 12–10 | 8–14 | 10–11–1 | — | 9–13 |
| Washington | 12–10 | 12–10 | 8–14 | 12–10–1 | 10–12 | 4–16 | 13–9 | — |

=== Opening Day lineup ===
| Jack Rothrock | CF |
| Hal Rhyne | SS |
| Russ Scarritt | RF |
| Ira Flagstead | LF |
| Bill Regan | 2B |
| Bobby Reeves | 3B |
| Phil Todt | 1B |
| Charlie Berry | C |
| Red Ruffing | P |

=== Roster ===
1929 Boston Red Sox
Roster
| Pitchers: Bill Bayne; Herb Bradley; Ed Carroll; Ray Dobens; Ed Durham; Milt Gaston; Hod Lisenbee; Danny MacFayden; Ed Morris; Red Ruffing; Jack Russell; Pat Simmons | Catchers: Casper Asbjornson; Charlie Berry; Ed Connolly; Alex Gaston; Johnnie Heving; Infielders: Bob Barrett; Wally Gerber; Grant Gillis; Bill Narleski; Bobby Reeves; Bill Regan; Hal Rhyne; Jerry Standaert; Phil Todt | Outfielders: Bill Barrett; Elliot Bigelow; Joe Cicero; Ira Flagstead; Jack Rothrock; Jack Ryan; Russ Scarritt; Doug Taitt; Denny Williams; Ken Williams | Manager: Bill Carrigan; Coaches: Heinie Wagner |

== Player stats ==
| = Indicates team leader |

=== Batting ===
==== Starters by position ====
Note: Pos = Position; G = Games played; AB = At bats; H = Hits; Avg. = Batting average; HR = Home runs; RBI = Runs batted in

| Pos | Player | G | AB | H | Avg. | HR | RBI |
|---|---|---|---|---|---|---|---|
| C | Charlie Berry | 77 | 207 | 50 | .242 | 1 | 21 |
| 1B | Phil Todt | 153 | 534 | 140 | .262 | 4 | 64 |
| 2B | Bill Regan | 104 | 371 | 107 | .288 | 1 | 54 |
| SS | Hal Rhyne | 120 | 346 | 87 | .251 | 0 | 38 |
| 3B | Bobby Reeves | 140 | 460 | 114 | .248 | 2 | 28 |
| OF | Jack Rothrock | 143 | 473 | 142 | .300 | 6 | 59 |
| OF | Russ Scarritt | 151 | 540 | 159 | .294 | 1 | 71 |
| OF | Bill Barrett | 111 | 370 | 100 | .270 | 3 | 35 |

==== Other batters ====
Note: G = Games played; AB = At bats; H = Hits; Avg. = Batting average; HR = Home runs; RBI = Runs batted in

| Player | G | AB | H | Avg. | HR | RBI |
|---|---|---|---|---|---|---|
| Bill Narleski | 96 | 260 | 72 | .277 | 0 | 25 |
| Elliot Bigelow | 100 | 211 | 60 | .284 | 1 | 26 |
| Johnnie Heving | 76 | 188 | 60 | .319 | 0 | 23 |
| Ken Williams | 74 | 139 | 48 | .345 | 3 | 21 |
| Bob Barrett | 68 | 126 | 34 | .270 | 0 | 19 |
| Alex Gaston | 55 | 116 | 26 | .224 | 2 | 9 |
| Wally Gerber | 61 | 91 | 15 | .165 | 0 | 5 |
| Grant Gillis | 28 | 73 | 18 | .247 | 0 | 11 |
| Doug Taitt | 26 | 65 | 18 | .277 | 0 | 6 |
| Ira Flagstead | 14 | 36 | 11 | .306 | 0 | 3 |
| Joe Cicero | 10 | 32 | 10 | .313 | 0 | 4 |
| Casper Asbjornson | 17 | 29 | 3 | .103 | 0 | 0 |
| Jerry Standaert | 19 | 18 | 3 | .167 | 0 | 4 |
| Ed Connolly | 5 | 8 | 0 | .000 | 0 | 0 |
| Jack Ryan | 2 | 3 | 0 | .000 | 0 | 0 |

=== Pitching ===
| = Indicates league leader |

==== Starting pitchers ====
Note: G = Games pitched; IP = Innings pitched; W = Wins; L = Losses; ERA = Earned run average; SO = Strikeouts

| Player | G | IP | W | L | ERA | SO |
|---|---|---|---|---|---|---|
| Red Ruffing | 35 | 244.1 | 9 | 22 | 4.86 | 109 |
| Milt Gaston | 39 | 243.2 | 12 | 19 | 3.73 | 83 |
| Jack Russell | 35 | 227.1 | 6 | 18 | 3.92 | 37 |
| Danny MacFayden | 32 | 221.0 | 10 | 18 | 3.62 | 61 |
| Ed Morris | 33 | 208.1 | 14 | 14 | 4.45 | 73 |

==== Other pitchers ====
Note: G = Games pitched; IP = Innings pitched; W = Wins; L = Losses; ERA = Earned run average; SO = Strikeouts

| Player | G | IP | W | L | ERA | SO |
|---|---|---|---|---|---|---|
| Bill Bayne | 27 | 84.1 | 5 | 5 | 6.72 | 26 |

==== Relief pitchers ====
Note: G = Games pitched; W = Wins; L = Losses; SV = Saves; ERA = Earned run average; SO = Strikeouts

| Player | G | W | L | SV | ERA | SO |
|---|---|---|---|---|---|---|
| Ed Carroll | 24 | 1 | 0 | 1 | 5.61 | 13 |
| Ed Durham | 14 | 1 | 0 | 0 | 9.27 | 6 |
| Ray Dobens | 11 | 0 | 0 | 0 | 3.81 | 4 |
| Hod Lisenbee | 5 | 0 | 0 | 0 | 5.19 | 2 |
| Herb Bradley | 3 | 0 | 0 | 0 | 6.75 | 0 |
| Pat Simmons | 2 | 0 | 0 | 1 | 0.00 | 2 |
