= 1930 Boston Red Sox season =

Major League Baseball season

1930 Boston Red Sox
- League: American League
- Ballpark: Fenway Park
- City: Boston, Massachusetts
- Record: 52–102 (.338)
- League place: 8th
- Owners: J. A. Robert Quinn
- Managers: Heinie Wagner
- Radio: WNAC (Fred Hoey)
- Stats: ESPN.com; Baseball Reference

The 1930 Boston Red Sox season was the 30th season in the franchise's Major League Baseball history. The team's home field was Fenway Park. The Red Sox finished last in the eight-team American League (AL) with a record of 52 wins and 102 losses, 50 games behind the Philadelphia Athletics, who went on to win the 1930 World Series.

The Red Sox played their Sunday home games at Braves Field this season, as had been the case since the team's 1929 season, due to Fenway being close to a house of worship. The team played a total of 20 home games at Braves Field during the 1930 season; 16 games on Sundays, plus two non-Sunday doubleheaders.

== Regular season ==
=== Season standings ===
American League
Team	W	L	Pct.	GB	Home	Road
Philadelphia Athletics	102	52	.662	—	58‍–‍18	44‍–‍34
Washington Senators	94	60	.610	8	56‍–‍21	38‍–‍39
New York Yankees	86	68	.558	16	47‍–‍29	39‍–‍39
Cleveland Indians	81	73	.526	21	44‍–‍33	37‍–‍40
Detroit Tigers	75	79	.487	27	45‍–‍33	30‍–‍46
St. Louis Browns	64	90	.416	38	38‍–‍40	26‍–‍50
Chicago White Sox	62	92	.403	40	34‍–‍44	28‍–‍48
Boston Red Sox	52	102	.338	50	30‍–‍46	22‍–‍56

=== Record vs. opponents ===
1930 American League record Sources:
Team	BOS	CWS	CLE	DET	NYY	PHA	SLB	WSH
Boston	—	13–9	7–15	8–14	6–16	4–18	9–13	5–17
Chicago	9–13	—	10–12	9–13	8–14	6–16	12–10	8–14
Cleveland	15–7	12–10	—	11–11	10–12	7–15	16–6	10–12
Detroit	14–8	13–9	11–11	—	9–13	7–15	11–11	10–12
New York	16–6	14–8	12–10	13–9	—	10–12	16–6	5–17
Philadelphia	18–4	16–6	15–7	15–7	12–10	—	16–6	10–12
St. Louis	13–9	10–12	6–16	11–11	6–16	6–16	—	12–10
Washington	17–5	14–8	12–10	12–10	17–5	12–10	10–12	—

=== Opening Day lineup ===
Jack Rothrock	RF
Otto Miller	3B
Tom Oliver	CF
Russ Scarritt	LF
Bill Regan	2B
Phil Todt	1B
Bill Narleski	SS
Johnnie Heving	C
Danny MacFayden	P

=== Roster ===
1930 Boston Red Sox
Roster
Pitchers: Bill Bayne; Frank Bushey; Ed Durham; Milt Gaston; Bob Kline; Hod Lisenbee; Danny MacFayden; Ed Morris; Frank Mulroney; Red Ruffing; Jack Russell; Ben Shields; George Smith	Catchers: Charlie Berry; Ed Connolly; Johnnie Heving; Infielders: Otto Miller; Bill Narleski; Bobby Reeves; Bill Regan; Hal Rhyne; Bill Sweeney; Jerry Standaert; Phil Todt; Rabbit Warstler	Outfielders: Bill Barrett; Joe Cicero; Cedric Durst; Tom Oliver; Jack Rothrock; Russ Scarritt; Charlie Small; Earl Webb; Other batters: Jim Galvin; Tom Winsett	Manager: Heinie Wagner; Coaches: Jack McCallister

During the season, the Red Sox and the Boston Braves wore a patch commemorating Boston's tricentennial.

== Player stats ==
=== Batting ===
==== Starters by position ====
Note: Pos = Position; G = Games played; AB = At bats; H = Hits; Avg. = Batting average; HR = Home runs; RBI = Runs batted in

Pos	Player	G	AB	H	Avg.	HR	RBI
C	Charlie Berry	88	256	74	.289	6	35
1B	Phil Todt	111	383	103	.269	11	62
2B	Bill Regan	134	507	135	.266	3	53
SS	Hal Rhyne	107	296	60	.203	0	23
3B	Otto Miller	112	370	106	.286	0	40
OF	Russ Scarritt	113	447	129	.289	2	48
OF	Tom Oliver	154	646	189	.293	0	46
OF	Earl Webb	127	449	145	.323	16	66

==== Other batters ====
Note: G = Games played; AB = At bats; H = Hits; Avg. = Batting average; HR = Home runs; RBI = Runs batted in

Player	G	AB	H	Avg.	HR	RBI
Cedric Durst	102	302	74	.245	1	24
Bobby Reeves	92	272	59	.217	2	18
Bill Sweeney	88	243	75	.309	4	30
Johnnie Heving	75	220	61	.277	0	17
Rabbit Warstler	54	162	30	.185	1	13
Bill Narleski	39	98	23	.235	0	7
Jack Rothrock	45	65	18	.277	0	4
Ed Connolly	27	48	9	.188	0	7
Joe Cicero	18	30	5	.167	0	4
Charlie Small	25	18	3	.167	0	0
Bill Barrett	6	18	3	.167	0	1
Jim Galvin	2	2	0	.000	0	0
Tom Winsett	1	1	0	.000	0	0

=== Pitching ===
==== Starting pitchers ====
Note: G = Games pitched; IP = Innings pitched; W = Wins; L = Losses; ERA = Earned run average; SO = Strikeouts

Player	G	IP	W	L	ERA	SO
Milt Gaston	38	273.0	13	20	3.92	99
Danny MacFayden	36	269.1	11	14	4.21	76
Hod Lisenbee	37	237.1	10	17	4.40	47
Jack Russell	35	229.2	9	20	5.45	35
Red Ruffing	4	24.0	0	3	6.38	14

==== Other pitchers ====
Note: G = Games pitched; IP = Innings pitched; W = Wins; L = Losses; ERA = Earned run average; SO = Strikeouts

Player	G	IP	W	L	ERA	SO
Ed Durham	33	140.0	4	15	4.69	28
Ed Morris	18	65.1	4	9	4.13	28

==== Relief pitchers ====
Note: G = Games pitched; W = Wins; L = Losses; SV = Saves; ERA = Earned run average; SO = Strikeouts

Player	G	W	L	SV	ERA	SO
George Smith	27	1	2	0	6.60	21
Frank Bushey	11	0	1	0	6.30	4
Ben Shields	3	0	0	0	9.00	1
Frank Mulroney	2	0	1	0	3.00	2
Bill Bayne	1	0	0	0	4.50	1
Bob Kline	1	0	0	0	0.00	0
