= 1927 Washington Senators season =

1927 Washington Senators
- League: American League
- Ballpark: Griffith Stadium
- City: Washington, D.C.
- Record: 85–69 (.552)
- League place: 3rd
- Owners: Clark Griffith and William Richardson
- Managers: Bucky Harris

The 1927 Washington Senators won 85 games, lost 69, and finished in third place in the American League. They were managed by Bucky Harris and played home games at Griffith Stadium.

== Offseason ==
- January 15, 1927: Roger Peckinpaugh was traded by the Senators to the Chicago White Sox for Sloppy Thurston and Leo Mangum.
- January 31, 1927: Tris Speaker was signed as a free agent by the Senators.

== Regular season ==
- September 30, 1927: Senators' pitcher Tom Zachary gave up Babe Ruth's 60th home run of the season, breaking Ruth's own record for homers in one season of 59 set in 1921.

=== Season standings ===
American League
Team	W	L	Pct.	GB	Home	Road
New York Yankees	110	44	.714	—	57‍–‍19	53‍–‍25
Philadelphia Athletics	91	63	.591	19	50‍–‍27	41‍–‍36
Washington Senators	85	69	.552	25	51‍–‍28	34‍–‍41
Detroit Tigers	82	71	.536	27½	44‍–‍32	38‍–‍39
Chicago White Sox	70	83	.458	39½	38‍–‍37	32‍–‍46
Cleveland Indians	66	87	.431	43½	35‍–‍42	31‍–‍45
St. Louis Browns	59	94	.386	50½	38‍–‍38	21‍–‍56
Boston Red Sox	51	103	.331	59	29‍–‍49	22‍–‍54

=== Record vs. opponents ===
1927 American League record Sources:
Team	BOS	CWS	CLE	DET	NYY	PHA	SLB	WSH
Boston	—	11–11	15–7	5–17	4–18	6–16	6–16	4–18
Chicago	11–11	—	8–14	13–8	5–17	8–14	15–7	10–12
Cleveland	7–15	14–8	—	7–15	10–12	10–12	10–11	8–14
Detroit	17–5	8–13	15–7	—	8–14	9–13	14–8–1	11–11–2
New York	18–4	17–5	12–10	14–8	—	14–8–1	21–1	14–8
Philadelphia	16–6	14–8	12–10	13–9	8–14–1	—	16–6	12–10
St. Louis	16–6	7–15	11–10	8–14–1	1–21	6–16	—	10–12–1
Washington	18–4	12–10	14–8	11–11–2	8–14	10–12	12–10–1	—

=== Roster ===
1927 Washington Senators
Roster
Pitchers: Garland Braxton; Bobby Burke; Dick Coffman; Stan Coveleski; Alvin Crowder; Bump Hadley; Paul Hopkins; Walter Johnson; Dick Jones; Ralph Judd; Hod Lisenbee; Firpo Marberry; George Murray; Sloppy Thurston; Clay Van Alstyne; Tom Zachary	Catchers: Johnny Berger; Mickey O'Neil; Muddy Ruel; Bennie Tate; Infielders: Ossie Bluege; Buddy Dear; Grant Gillis; Bucky Harris; Jackie Hayes; Joe Judge; Buddy Myer; Eddie Onslow; Bobby Reeves; Topper Rigney; Stuffy Stewart	Outfielders: Red Barnes; Nick Cullop; Babe Ganzel; Goose Goslin; Earl McNeely; Sam Rice; Tris Speaker; Ollie Tucker; Sam West; Other batters: Lefty Atkinson	Manager: Bucky Harris

== Player stats ==
=== Batting ===
==== Starters by position ====
Note: Pos = Position; G = Games played; AB = At bats; H = Hits; Avg. = Batting average; HR = Home runs; RBI = Runs batted in

Pos	Player	G	AB	H	Avg.	HR	RBI
C	Muddy Ruel	131	428	132	.308	1	52
1B	Joe Judge	137	522	161	.308	2	71
2B	Bucky Harris	128	475	127	.267	1	55
SS	Bobby Reeves	112	380	97	.255	1	39
3B	Ossie Bluege	146	503	138	.274	1	66
OF	Tris Speaker	141	523	171	.327	2	73
OF	Goose Goslin	148	581	194	.334	13	120
OF	Sam Rice	142	603	179	.297	2	65

==== Other batters ====
Note: G = Games played; AB = At bats; H = Hits; Avg. = Batting average; HR = Home runs; RBI = Runs batted in

Player	G	AB	H	Avg.	HR	RBI
Earl McNeely	73	185	51	.276	0	16
Topper Rigney	45	132	36	.273	0	13
Bennie Tate	61	131	41	.313	1	24
Stuffy Stewart	56	129	31	.240	0	4
Sam West	38	67	16	.239	0	6
Buddy Myer	15	51	11	.216	0	7
Babe Ganzel	13	48	21	.438	1	13
Grant Gillis	10	36	8	.222	0	2
Jackie Hayes	10	29	7	.241	0	2
Ollie Tucker	20	24	5	.208	0	8
Nick Cullop	15	23	5	.217	0	1
Eddie Onslow	9	18	4	.222	0	1
Johnny Berger	9	15	4	.267	0	1
Red Barnes	3	11	4	.364	0	0
Mickey O'Neil	5	6	0	.000	0	0
Buddy Dear	2	1	0	.000	0	0
Lefty Atkinson	1	1	0	.000	0	0

=== Pitching ===
==== Starting pitchers ====
Note: G = Games pitched; IP = Innings pitched; W = Wins; L = Losses; ERA = Earned run average; SO = Strikeouts

Player	G	IP	W	L	ERA	SO
Hod Lisenbee	39	242.0	18	9	3.57	105
Sloppy Thurston	29	205.1	13	13	4.47	38
Bump Hadley	30	198.2	14	6	2.85	60
Walter Johnson	18	107.2	5	6	5.10	48
Tom Zachary	15	102.2	4	7	3.94	13

==== Other pitchers ====
Note: G = Games pitched; IP = Innings pitched; W = Wins; L = Losses; ERA = Earned run average; SO = Strikeouts

Player	G	IP	W	L	ERA	SO
Firpo Marberry	56	155.1	10	7	4.64	74
Bobby Burke	36	100.0	3	2	3.96	20
General Crowder	15	67.1	4	7	4.54	22
George Murray	7	18.0	1	1	7.00	5
Dick Coffman	5	16.0	0	1	3.38	5
Stan Coveleski	5	14.1	2	1	3.14	3
Paul Hopkins	2	9.0	1	0	5.00	5

==== Relief pitchers ====
Note: G = Games pitched; W = Wins; L = Losses; SV = Saves; ERA = Earned run average; SO = Strikeouts

Player	G	W	L	SV	ERA	SO
Garland Braxton	58	10	9	13	2.95	96
Dick Jones	2	0	0	0	21.60	1
Clay Van Alstyne	2	0	0	0	3.00	0
Ralph Judd	1	0	0	1	6.75	2
