= 1930 Washington Senators season =

1930 Washington Senators
- League: American League
- Ballpark: Griffith Stadium
- City: Washington, D.C.
- Record: 94–60 (.610)
- League place: 2nd
- Owners: Clark Griffith and William Richardson
- Managers: Walter Johnson

The 1930 Washington Senators won 94 games, lost 60, and finished in second place in the American League. They were managed by Walter Johnson and played home games at Griffith Stadium.

== Regular season ==
=== Season standings ===
American League
Team	W	L	Pct.	GB	Home	Road
Philadelphia Athletics	102	52	.662	—	58‍–‍18	44‍–‍34
Washington Senators	94	60	.610	8	56‍–‍21	38‍–‍39
New York Yankees	86	68	.558	16	47‍–‍29	39‍–‍39
Cleveland Indians	81	73	.526	21	44‍–‍33	37‍–‍40
Detroit Tigers	75	79	.487	27	45‍–‍33	30‍–‍46
St. Louis Browns	64	90	.416	38	38‍–‍40	26‍–‍50
Chicago White Sox	62	92	.403	40	34‍–‍44	28‍–‍48
Boston Red Sox	52	102	.338	50	30‍–‍46	22‍–‍56

=== Record vs. opponents ===
1930 American League record Sources:
Team	BOS	CWS	CLE	DET	NYY	PHA	SLB	WSH
Boston	—	13–9	7–15	8–14	6–16	4–18	9–13	5–17
Chicago	9–13	—	10–12	9–13	8–14	6–16	12–10	8–14
Cleveland	15–7	12–10	—	11–11	10–12	7–15	16–6	10–12
Detroit	14–8	13–9	11–11	—	9–13	7–15	11–11	10–12
New York	16–6	14–8	12–10	13–9	—	10–12	16–6	5–17
Philadelphia	18–4	16–6	15–7	15–7	12–10	—	16–6	10–12
St. Louis	13–9	10–12	6–16	11–11	6–16	6–16	—	12–10
Washington	17–5	14–8	12–10	12–10	17–5	12–10	10–12	—

=== Roster ===
1930 Washington Senators roster
Roster
Pitchers: Garland Braxton; Lloyd Brown; Bobby Burke; Harry Child; Alvin Crowder; Carl Fischer; Bump Hadley; Sam Jones; Ad Liska; Firpo Marberry; Carlos Moore; Myles Thomas	Catchers: Pinky Hargrave; Muddy Ruel; Roy Spencer; Bennie Tate; Infielders: Ossie Bluege; Harley Boss; Joe Cronin; Patsy Gharrity; Jackie Hayes; Joe Judge; Joe Kuhel; Jim McLeod; Buddy Myer; Art Shires; Ray Treadaway	Outfielders: Bill Barrett; Goose Goslin; Dave Harris; George Loepp; Heinie Manush; Jake Powell; Sam Rice; Sam West; Other batters: Red Barnes	Manager: Walter Johnson; Coaches: Nick Altrock; Patsy Gharrity; Al Schacht

== Player stats ==
=== Batting ===
==== Starters by position ====
Note: Pos = Position; G = Games played; AB = At bats; H = Hits; Avg. = Batting average; HR = Home runs; RBI = Runs batted in

Pos	Player	G	AB	H	Avg.	HR	RBI
C	Roy Spencer	93	321	82	.255	0	36
1B	Joe Judge	126	442	144	.326	10	80
2B	Buddy Myer	138	541	164	.303	2	61
SS	Joe Cronin	154	587	203	.346	13	126
3B	Ossie Bluege	134	476	138	.290	3	69
OF	Heinie Manush	88	356	129	.362	7	65
OF	Sam West	120	411	135	.328	6	67
OF	Sam Rice	147	593	207	.349	1	73

==== Other batters ====
Note: G = Games played; AB = At bats; H = Hits; Avg. = Batting average; HR = Home runs; RBI = Runs batted in

Player	G	AB	H	Avg.	HR	RBI
Dave Harris	73	205	65	.317	4	44
Muddy Ruel	66	198	50	.253	0	26
Goose Goslin	47	188	51	.271	7	38
Jackie Hayes	52	166	47	.283	1	20
George Loepp	50	134	37	.276	0	14
Art Shires	38	84	31	.369	1	19
Joe Kuhel	18	63	18	.286	0	17
Jim McLeod	18	34	9	.265	0	1
Pinky Hargrave	10	31	6	.194	1	7
Bennie Tate	14	20	5	.250	0	2
Ray Treadaway	6	19	4	.211	0	1
Red Barnes	12	12	2	.167	0	0
Bill Barrett	6	4	0	.000	0	0
Jake Powell	3	4	0	.000	0	0
Harley Boss	3	3	0	.000	0	0
Patsy Gharrity	2	1	0	.000	0	0

=== Pitching ===
==== Starting pitchers ====
Note: G = Games pitched; IP = Innings pitched; W = Wins; L = Losses; ERA = Earned run average; SO = Strikeouts

Player	G	IP	W	L	ERA	SO
Bump Hadley	42	260.1	15	11	3.73	162
General Crowder	27	202.1	15	9	3.60	65
Sad Sam Jones	25	183.1	15	7	4.07	60

==== Other pitchers ====
Note: G = Games pitched; IP = Innings pitched; W = Wins; L = Losses; ERA = Earned run average; SO = Strikeouts

Player	G	IP	W	L	ERA	SO
Lloyd Brown	38	197.0	16	12	4.25	59
Firpo Marberry	33	185.0	15	5	4.09	56
Ad Liska	32	150.2	9	7	3.29	40
Bobby Burke	24	74.1	3	4	3.63	35
Myles Thomas	12	33.2	2	2	8.29	12
Carl Fischer	8	33.1	1	1	4.86	21

==== Relief pitchers ====
Note: G = Games pitched; W = Wins; L = Losses; SV = Saves; ERA = Earned run average; SO = Strikeouts

Player	G	W	L	SV	ERA	SO
Garland Braxton	15	3	2	5	3.29	7
Harry Child	5	0	0	0	6.30	5
Carlos Moore	4	0	0	0	2.31	2

== Farm system ==
Level	Team	League	Manager
A	Chattanooga Lookouts	Southern Association	Bill Rodgers
D	Hagerstown Hubs	Blue Ridge League	Jake Miller and Joe Cambria
