= Grant Gillis =

American baseball player (1901–1981)

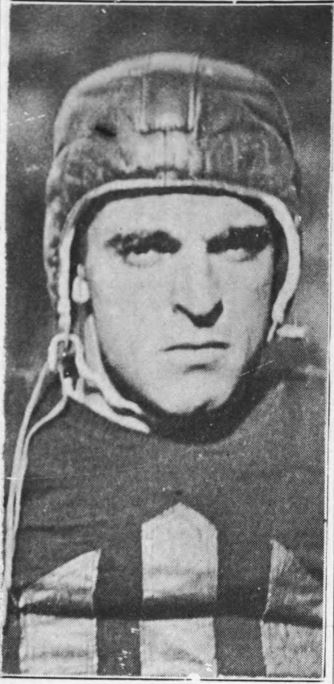
- Gillis with Alabama in 1925
- Infielder
- Born: January 24, 1901; Grove Hill, Alabama, U.S.
- Died: February 4, 1981 (aged 80); Thomasville, Alabama, U.S.
- Batted: Right Threw: Right

MLB debut
- September 19, 1927, for the Washington Senators

Last MLB appearance
- June 25, 1929, for the Boston Red Sox

MLB statistics
- Batting average: .245
- Home runs: 0
- Runs batted in: 23
- Stats at Baseball Reference

Teams
- Washington Senators (1927–1928); Boston Red Sox (1929)

Grant Gillis (January 24, 1901 – February 4, 1981) was an American utility infielder in Major League Baseball who played from 1927 through 1929 for the Washington Senators (1927–28) and Boston Red Sox (1929). Listed at 5 ft 10 in (1.78 m), 165 lb., Gillis batted and threw right-handed. A native of Grove Hill, Alabama, he was signed by Washington out of the University of Alabama. At Alabama he was the first quarterback under Wallace Wade.

In a three-season career, Gillis was a .245 hitter (48-for-196) with 10 RBI and 26 runs in 62 games, including 12 doubles and two triples. He did not hit a home run. As an infielder, he made 59 appearances at second base (30), shortstop (26) and third base (3).

Gillis died in Thomasville, Alabama, at age 80.

== Trivia ==
- In a five-for-one trade, Gillis was dealt by the Senators to Boston along with Elliot Bigelow, Milt Gaston, Hod Lisenbee and Bobby Reeves, in the transaction that brought Buddy Myer to Washington on December 15, 1928.
