= Ed Connolly =

Ed Connolly or Edward Connolly is the name of:

- Ed Connolly (catcher) (1908–1963), catcher in Major League Baseball, 1929–1932
- Ed Connolly (pitcher) (1939–1998), his son, pitcher in Major League Baseball, 1964–1967
- Edward G. Connolly (1928–2006), American politician in Massachusetts

== See also ==
- Edward Conolly (disambiguation)
- Edward Connelly (1859–1928), American film actor
- Edward J. Connelly (1876–1960), American military officer
- Edward M. Connelly (1892–1947), federal prosecutor
