= Narleski =

Narleski is a surname of Polish origin. Notable people with the surname include:

- Bill Narleski (1900–1964), American baseball player
- Ray Narleski (1928–2012), American baseball player, son of Bill
