= 1930 Philadelphia Athletics season =

1930 Philadelphia Athletics
- World Series champions American League champions
- League: American League
- Ballpark: Shibe Park
- City: Philadelphia
- Record: 102–52 (.662)
- League place: 1st
- Owners: Connie Mack, Tom Shibe and John Shibe
- Managers: Connie Mack

The 1930 Philadelphia Athletics season involved the A's finishing first in the American League with a record of 102 wins and 52 losses. It was the team's second of three consecutive pennants.

During the 1930 World Series, the A's defeated the St. Louis Cardinals in six games. This was the A's final World Series championship in Philadelphia. The team did not win the World Series again until forty-two years later, in 1972, after the club moved to Oakland.

When playing the Cleveland Indians on July 25, the Athletics became the only team in Major League history to execute a triple steal twice in one game.

== Regular season ==
The A's had three Hall of Famers in the team's starting line-up: Mickey Cochrane, Jimmie Foxx, and Al Simmons. Simmons won the AL batting title with a .381 average. Pitching ace Lefty Grove won the pitching triple crown.

=== Season standings ===
American League
Team	W	L	Pct.	GB	Home	Road
Philadelphia Athletics	102	52	.662	—	58‍–‍18	44‍–‍34
Washington Senators	94	60	.610	8	56‍–‍21	38‍–‍39
New York Yankees	86	68	.558	16	47‍–‍29	39‍–‍39
Cleveland Indians	81	73	.526	21	44‍–‍33	37‍–‍40
Detroit Tigers	75	79	.487	27	45‍–‍33	30‍–‍46
St. Louis Browns	64	90	.416	38	38‍–‍40	26‍–‍50
Chicago White Sox	62	92	.403	40	34‍–‍44	28‍–‍48
Boston Red Sox	52	102	.338	50	30‍–‍46	22‍–‍56

=== Record vs. opponents ===
1930 American League record Sources:
Team	BOS	CWS	CLE	DET	NYY	PHA	SLB	WSH
Boston	—	13–9	7–15	8–14	6–16	4–18	9–13	5–17
Chicago	9–13	—	10–12	9–13	8–14	6–16	12–10	8–14
Cleveland	15–7	12–10	—	11–11	10–12	7–15	16–6	10–12
Detroit	14–8	13–9	11–11	—	9–13	7–15	11–11	10–12
New York	16–6	14–8	12–10	13–9	—	10–12	16–6	5–17
Philadelphia	18–4	16–6	15–7	15–7	12–10	—	16–6	10–12
St. Louis	13–9	10–12	6–16	11–11	6–16	6–16	—	12–10
Washington	17–5	14–8	12–10	12–10	17–5	12–10	10–12	—

=== Roster ===
1930 Philadelphia Athletics
Roster
Pitchers: George Earnshaw; Howard Ehmke; Lefty Grove; Glenn Liebhardt; Roy Mahaffey; Al Mahon; Charlie Perkins; Jack Quinn; Eddie Rommel; Bill Shores; Rube Walberg	Catchers: Mickey Cochrane; Cy Perkins; Wally Schang; Infielders: Max Bishop; Joe Boley; Jimmy Dykes; Jimmie Foxx; Pinky Higgins; Jim Keesey; Eric McNair; Dib Williams	Outfielders: Doc Cramer; Mule Haas; Spencer Harris; Bing Miller; Jimmy Moore; Al Simmons; Homer Summa; Other batters: Eddie Collins	Manager: Connie Mack; Coaches: Kid Gleason; Earle Mack

== Player stats ==
= Indicates team leader

=== Batting ===
==== Starters by position ====
Note: Pos = Position; G = Games played; AB = At bats; H = Hits; Avg. = Batting average; HR = Home runs; RBI = Runs batted in

Pos	Player	G	AB	H	Avg.	HR	RBI
C	Mickey Cochrane	130	487	174	.357	10	87
1B	Jimmie Foxx	153	562	188	.335	37	156
2B	Max Bishop	130	441	111	.252	10	38
3B	Jimmy Dykes	125	435	131	.301	6	73
SS	Joe Boley	121	420	116	.276	4	55
LF	Al Simmons	138	554	211	.381	36	165
CF	Mule Haas	132	532	159	.299	2	68
RF	Bing Miller	154	585	177	.303	9	100

==== Other batters ====
Note: G = Games played; AB = At bats; H = Hits; Avg. = Batting average; HR = Home runs; RBI = Runs batted in

Player	G	AB	H	Avg.	HR	RBI
Eric McNair	78	237	63	.266	0	34
Dib Williams	67	191	50	.262	3	22
Wally Schang	45	92	16	.174	1	9
Doc Cramer	30	82	19	.232	0	6
Homer Summa	25	54	15	.278	1	5
Jimmy Moore	15	50	19	.380	2	12
Spence Harris	22	49	9	.184	0	3
Cy Perkins	20	38	6	.158	0	4
Pinky Higgins	14	24	6	.250	0	0
Jim Keesey	11	12	3	.250	0	2
Eddie Collins	3	2	1	.500	0	0

=== Pitching ===
==== Starting pitchers ====
Note: G = Games pitched; IP = Innings pitched; W = Wins; L = Losses; ERA = Earned run average; SO = Strikeouts

Player	G	IP	W	L	ERA	SO
George Earnshaw	49	296.0	22	13	4.44	193
Lefty Grove	50	291.0	28	5	2.54	209
Rube Walberg	38	205.1	13	12	4.69	100
Bill Shores	31	159.0	12	4	4.19	48

Note: Lefty Grove was team leader and league leader in saves with 9.

==== Other pitchers ====
Note: G = Games pitched; IP = Innings pitched; W = Wins; L = Losses; ERA = Earned run average; SO = Strikeouts

Player	G	IP	W	L	ERA	SO
Roy Mahaffey	33	152.2	9	5	5.01	38
Howard Ehmke	3	10.0	0	1	11.70	4

==== Relief pitchers ====
Note: G = Games pitched; W = Wins; L = Losses; SV = Saves; ERA = Earned run average; SO = Strikeouts

Player	G	W	L	SV	ERA	SO
Jack Quinn	35	9	7	6	4.42	28
Eddie Rommel	35	9	4	3	4.28	35
Charlie Perkins	8	0	0	0	6.46	15
Glenn Liebhardt	5	0	1	0	11.00	2
Al Mahon	3	0	0	0	22.85	0

== Awards and honors ==
=== American League top five finishers ===
Max Bishop

- #4 on-base percentage (.426)

Mickey Cochrane

- #5 batting average (.357)

George Earnshaw

- #2 strikeouts (193)
- #3 wins (22)

Jimmie Foxx

- #3 home runs (37)
- #3 runs batted in (156)
- #3 on-base percentage (.429)
- #4 slugging percentage (.637)

Lefty Grove

- #1 wins (28)
- #1 earned run average (2.54)
- #1 strikeouts (209)
- #1 saves (9)

Al Simmons

- #1 batting average (.381)
- #1 runs scored (152)
- #2 runs batted in (165)
- #3 slugging percentage (.708)
- #5 home runs (36)

== 1930 World Series ==
AL Philadelphia Athletics (4) vs. NL St. Louis Cardinals (2)

Game	Score	Date	Location	Attendance
1	Cardinals – 2, Athletics – 5	October 1	Shibe Park	32,295
2	Cardinals – 1, Athletics – 6	October 2	Shibe Park	32,295
3	Athletics – 0, Cardinals – 5	October 4	Sportsman's Park	36,944
4	Athletics – 1, Cardinals – 3	October 5	Sportsman's Park	39,946
5	Athletics – 2, Cardinals – 0	October 6	Sportsman's Park	38,844
6	Cardinals – 1, Athletics – 7	October 8	Shibe Park	32,295
