= Bobby Reeves (baseball) =

American baseball player (1904–1993)

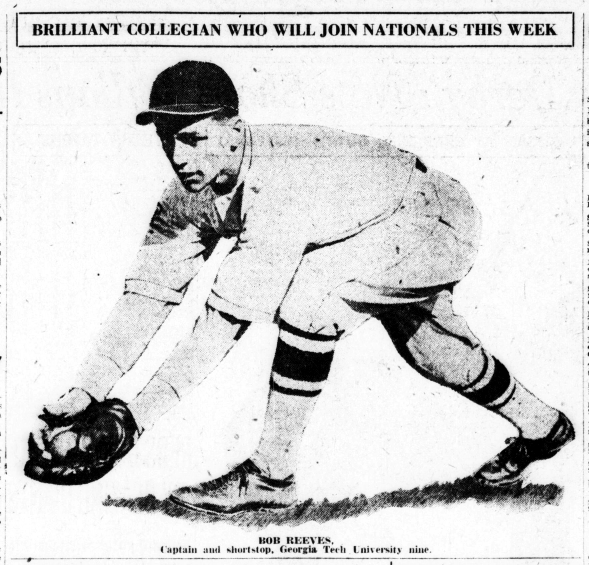
- Infielder
- Born: June 24, 1904; Hill City, Tennessee, U.S.
- Died: June 4, 1993 (aged 88); Chattanooga, Tennessee, U.S.
- Batted: Right Threw: Right

MLB debut
- June 9, 1926, for the Washington Senators

Last MLB appearance
- September 13, 1931, for the Boston Red Sox

MLB statistics
- Batting average: .252
- Home runs: 8
- Runs batted in: 135
- Stats at Baseball Reference

Teams
- Washington Senators (1926–1928); Boston Red Sox (1929–1931)

Robert Edwin Reeves (June 24, 1904 – June 4, 1993) was an infielder in Major League Baseball who played from 1926 through 1931 for the Washington Senators (1926–28) and Boston Red Sox (1929–31). Listed at 5 ft 11 in (1.80 m), 170 lb., Reeves batted and threw right-handed. A native of Hill City, Tennessee, he was signed by Washington out of the Georgia Institute of Technology.

A versatile utility man, Reeves was able to play all positions except catcher. He made 479 appearances at third base (229), shortstop, second base (67), first base (1), right field (1), and also served as an emergency pitcher (1).

Reeves posted career-numbers with a .303 batting average and 46 RBI for the 1928 Washington Senators, before being dealt in a five-for-one trade to the Boston Red Sox along with Elliot Bigelow, Milt Gaston, Grant Gillis, and Hod Lisenbee in exchange for Buddy Myer. In 1929, he posted a career-high 140 games with Boston, including 131 appearances as the team's regular third base.

In a six-season career, Reeves was a .252 hitter (402-for-1598) with eight home runs and 135 RBI in 502 games, including 203 runs, 55 doubles, eight triples, 21 stolen bases, and a .331 on-base percentage.

Reeves died in Chattanooga, Tennessee, 20 days short of his 89th birthday.

== Sources ==
- Career statistics from Baseball Reference
