= Edward Conolly =

Edward Conolly may refer to:

- Edward Conolly (judge) (1822–1908), New Zealand politician and judge
- Edward Michael Conolly (1786–1849), Irish Member of Parliament

== See also ==
- Edward Connolly (disambiguation)
