= 1930 New York Yankees season =

Season for the Major League Baseball team the New York Yankees

1930 New York Yankees
- League: American League
- Ballpark: Yankee Stadium
- City: New York City, New York
- Record: 86–68 (.558)
- League place: 3rd
- Owners: Jacob Ruppert
- General managers: Ed Barrow
- Managers: Bob Shawkey (first season)

The New York Yankees played their 28th season in 1930. The team finished with a record of 86–68 (.558), finishing 16 games behind the Philadelphia Athletics. New York was managed by Bob Shawkey; the 1930 season was his only year managing the Yankees and his only season as a Major League manager. The team's owner (Jacob Ruppert) and general manager (Ed Barrow) were both future Hall of Famers. Yankees played their home games at Yankee Stadium. The Yankees set a team record by recording a .309 batting average during this season.

The Yankees fielded nine players who would eventually be enshrined in the Hall of Fame (Earle Combs, Bill Dickey, Lou Gehrig, Lefty Gomez, Waite Hoyt Tony Lazzeri, Herb Pennock, Red Ruffing, and Babe Ruth). This is the most all time, tied with the following year's team as well as the 1932 and 1933 Yankees teams. The same nine Hall of Famers played for the 1931, 1932, and 1933 teams, with the 1930 team differing only by not having Joe Sewell and instead featuring Waite Hoyt.

== Regular season ==
=== Season standings ===
American League
Team	W	L	Pct.	GB	Home	Road
Philadelphia Athletics	102	52	.662	—	58‍–‍18	44‍–‍34
Washington Senators	94	60	.610	8	56‍–‍21	38‍–‍39
New York Yankees	86	68	.558	16	47‍–‍29	39‍–‍39
Cleveland Indians	81	73	.526	21	44‍–‍33	37‍–‍40
Detroit Tigers	75	79	.487	27	45‍–‍33	30‍–‍46
St. Louis Browns	64	90	.416	38	38‍–‍40	26‍–‍50
Chicago White Sox	62	92	.403	40	34‍–‍44	28‍–‍48
Boston Red Sox	52	102	.338	50	30‍–‍46	22‍–‍56

=== Record vs. opponents ===
1930 American League record Sources:
Team	BOS	CWS	CLE	DET	NYY	PHA	SLB	WSH
Boston	—	13–9	7–15	8–14	6–16	4–18	9–13	5–17
Chicago	9–13	—	10–12	9–13	8–14	6–16	12–10	8–14
Cleveland	15–7	12–10	—	11–11	10–12	7–15	16–6	10–12
Detroit	14–8	13–9	11–11	—	9–13	7–15	11–11	10–12
New York	16–6	14–8	12–10	13–9	—	10–12	16–6	5–17
Philadelphia	18–4	16–6	15–7	15–7	12–10	—	16–6	10–12
St. Louis	13–9	10–12	6–16	11–11	6–16	6–16	—	12–10
Washington	17–5	14–8	12–10	12–10	17–5	12–10	10–12	—

=== Notable transactions ===
- May 30, 1930: Waite Hoyt and Mark Koenig were traded by the Yankees to the Detroit Tigers for Harry Rice, Ownie Carroll and Yats Wuestling.

=== Roster ===
1930 New York Yankees
Roster
Pitchers: 32 Frank Barnes; 11 Ownie Carroll; 34 Foster Edwards; 33 Sam Gibson; 22 Lefty Gomez; 18 Bill Henderson; 32 Ken Holloway; 11 Waite Hoyt; 14 Hank Johnson; 18,29 Lou McEvoy; 16 Herb Pennock; 12 George Pipgras; 18 Gordon Rhodes; 21 Red Ruffing; 15 Roy Sherid; 17 Ed Wells; 18 Tom Zachary	Catchers: 10 Benny Bengough; 8 Bill Dickey; 9 Bubbles Hargrave; 28 Arndt Jorgens; Infielders: 7 Ben Chapman; 4 Lou Gehrig; 2 Mark Koenig; 24 Lyn Lary; 5 Tony Lazzeri; 25 Jimmie Reese; 20 Billy Werber; 2 Yats Wuestling	Outfielders: 26 Sammy Byrd; 1 Earle Combs; 6 Dusty Cooke; 27 Cedric Durst; 32 Bill Karlon; 19 Harry Rice; 3 Babe Ruth	Manager: 29 Bob Shawkey; Coaches: 30 Jimmy Burke; 30 Art Fletcher; 31 Charley O'Leary

== Player stats ==
=== Batting ===
==== Starters by position ====
Note: Pos = Position; G = Games played; AB = At bats; H = Hits; Avg. = Batting average; HR = Home runs; RBI = Runs batted in

Pos	Player	G	AB	H	Avg.	HR	RBI
C	Bill Dickey	109	366	124	.339	5	65
1B	Lou Gehrig	154	581	220	.379	41	173
2B	Tony Lazzeri	143	571	173	.303	9	121
SS	Lyn Lary	117	464	134	.289	3	52
3B	Ben Chapman	138	513	162	.316	10	81
OF	Earle Combs	137	532	183	.344	7	82
OF	Harry Rice	100	346	103	.298	7	74
OF	Babe Ruth	145	518	186	.359	49	153

==== Other batters ====
Note: G = Games played; AB = At bats; H = Hits; Avg. = Batting average; HR = Home runs; RBI = Runs batted in

Player	G	AB	H	Avg.	HR	RBI
Samuel Byrd	92	218	62	.284	6	31
Dusty Cooke	92	216	55	.255	6	29
Jimmie Reese	77	188	65	.346	3	18
Bubbles Hargrave	45	108	30	.278	0	12
Benny Bengough	44	102	24	.235	0	12
Mark Koenig	21	74	17	.230	0	9
Yats Wuestling	25	58	11	.190	0	3
Arndt Jorgens	16	30	11	.367	0	1
Cedric Durst	8	19	3	.158	0	5
Billy Werber	4	14	4	.286	0	2
Bill Karlon	2	5	0	.000	0	0

=== Pitching ===
==== Starting pitchers ====
Note: G = Games pitched; IP = Innings pitched; W = Wins; L = Losses; ERA = Earned run average; SO = Strikeouts

Player	G	IP	W	L	ERA	SO
Red Ruffing	34	197.2	15	5	4.14	117
Herb Pennock	25	156.1	11	7	4.32	46
Ed Wells	27	150.2	12	3	5.20	46
Waite Hoyt	8	47.2	2	2	4.53	10
Tom Zachary	3	16.2	1	1	6.48	1
Frank Barnes	2	12.1	0	1	8.03	2
Babe Ruth	1	9.0	1	0	3.00	3
Sam Gibson	2	6.0	0	1	15.00	3

==== Other pitchers ====
Note: G = Games pitched; IP = Innings pitched; W = Wins; L = Losses; ERA = Earned run average; SO = Strikeouts

Player	G	IP	W	L	ERA	SO
George Pipgras	44	221.0	15	15	4.11	111
Roy Sherid	37	184.0	12	13	5.23	59
Hank Johnson	44	175.1	14	11	4.67	115
Lefty Gomez	15	60.0	2	5	5.55	22

==== Relief pitchers ====
Note: G = Games pitched; W = Wins; L = Losses; SV = Saves; ERA = Earned run average; SO = Strikeouts

Player	G	W	L	SV	ERA	SO
Lou McEvoy	28	1	3	4	6.71	14
Ken Holloway	16	0	0	1	5.24	11
Ownie Carroll	10	0	1	0	6.61	8
Bill Henderson	3	0	0	0	4.50	2
Gordon Rhodes	3	0	0	0	9.00	1
Foster Edwards	2	0	0	0	21.60	1

== Farm system ==
Level	Team	League	Manager
AA	Jersey City Skeeters	International League	Nick Allen and Joe Tinker
B	Hazleton Mountaineers	New York–Pennsylvania League	Walter Holke
D	Chambersburg Young Yanks	Blue Ridge League	Leo Mackey

LEAGUE CHAMPIONS: Chambersburg
