= Al Mahon =

American baseball player (1909-1977)

- Pitcher
- Born: September 23, 1909; Albion, Nebraska
- Died: December 26, 1977 (aged 68); New Haven, Connecticut
- Batted: Left Threw: Left

MLB debut
- April 22, 1930, for the Philadelphia Athletics

Last MLB appearance
- May 11, 1930, for the Philadelphia Athletics

MLB statistics
- Win–loss record: 0-0
- Earned run average: 22.85
- Strikeouts: 0
- Stats at Baseball Reference

Teams
- Philadelphia Athletics (1930)

Alfred Gwinn Mahon (September 23, 1909 – December 26, 1977) was a pitcher in Major League Baseball. He made three appearances, all in relief, for the Philadelphia Athletics in 1930.
