= 1930 Chicago White Sox season =

1930 Chicago White Sox
- League: American League
- Ballpark: Comiskey Park
- City: Chicago, Illinois
- Owners: Charles Comiskey
- Managers: Donie Bush
- Radio: WCFL (Johnny O'Hara); WGN (Quin Ryan); WMAQ (Hal Totten); WIBO

The 1930 Chicago White Sox season was the team's 30th season in the major leagues, and its 31st season overall. They finished with a record of 62–92, good enough for seventh place in the American League, 40 games behind the first place Philadelphia Athletics.

== Regular season ==
=== Season standings ===
American League
Team	W	L	Pct.	GB	Home	Road
Philadelphia Athletics	102	52	.662	—	58‍–‍18	44‍–‍34
Washington Senators	94	60	.610	8	56‍–‍21	38‍–‍39
New York Yankees	86	68	.558	16	47‍–‍29	39‍–‍39
Cleveland Indians	81	73	.526	21	44‍–‍33	37‍–‍40
Detroit Tigers	75	79	.487	27	45‍–‍33	30‍–‍46
St. Louis Browns	64	90	.416	38	38‍–‍40	26‍–‍50
Chicago White Sox	62	92	.403	40	34‍–‍44	28‍–‍48
Boston Red Sox	52	102	.338	50	30‍–‍46	22‍–‍56

=== Record vs. opponents ===
1930 American League record Sources:
Team	BOS	CWS	CLE	DET	NYY	PHA	SLB	WSH
Boston	—	13–9	7–15	8–14	6–16	4–18	9–13	5–17
Chicago	9–13	—	10–12	9–13	8–14	6–16	12–10	8–14
Cleveland	15–7	12–10	—	11–11	10–12	7–15	16–6	10–12
Detroit	14–8	13–9	11–11	—	9–13	7–15	11–11	10–12
New York	16–6	14–8	12–10	13–9	—	10–12	16–6	5–17
Philadelphia	18–4	16–6	15–7	15–7	12–10	—	16–6	10–12
St. Louis	13–9	10–12	6–16	11–11	6–16	6–16	—	12–10
Washington	17–5	14–8	12–10	12–10	17–5	12–10	10–12	—

=== Roster ===
1930 Chicago White Sox
Roster
Pitchers: Ted Blankenship; Garland Braxton; Pat Caraway; Red Faber; Dutch Henry; Ted Lyons; Hal McKain; Jim Moore; Tommy Thomas; Ed Walsh, Jr.; Biggs Wehde; Bob Weiland	Catchers: Chick Autry; Moe Berg; Buck Crouse; Butch Henline; Joe Klinger; Johnny Riddle; Bennie Tate; Infielders: Luke Appling; Bill Cissell; Bud Clancy; Bill Hunnefield; Irv Jeffries; Willie Kamm; John Kerr; Greg Mulleavy; Blondy Ryan; Art Shires; Ernie Smith; Johnny Watwood; Hugh Willingham	Outfielders: Red Barnes; Bruce Campbell; Bob Fothergill; Dave Harris; Smead Jolley; Alex Metzler; Jimmy Moore; Carl Reynolds	Manager: Donie Bush; Coaches: Mike Kelly

== Player stats ==
=== Batting ===
==== Starters by position ====
Note: Pos = Position; G = Games played; AB = At bats; H = Hits; Avg. = Batting average; HR = Home runs; RBI = Runs batted in

Pos	Player	G	AB	H	Avg.	HR	RBI
C	Bennie Tate	72	230	73	.317	0	27
1B	Johnny Watwood	133	427	129	.302	2	51
2B	Bill Cissell	141	562	152	.270	2	48
SS	Greg Mulleavy	77	289	76	.263	0	28
3B	Willie Kamm	112	331	89	.269	3	47
OF	Carl Reynolds	138	563	202	.359	22	104
OF	Red Barnes	85	266	66	.248	1	31
OF	Smead Jolley	152	616	193	.313	16	114

==== Other batters ====
Note: G = Games played; AB = At bats; H = Hits; Avg. = Batting average; HR = Home runs; RBI = Runs batted in

Player	G	AB	H	Avg.	HR	RBI
John Kerr	70	266	77	.289	3	27
Bud Clancy	68	234	57	.244	3	27
Bob Fothergill	52	135	40	.296	0	24
Art Shires	37	128	33	.258	1	18
Buck Crouse	42	118	30	.254	0	15
Irv Jeffries	40	97	23	.237	2	11
Blondy Ryan	28	87	18	.207	1	10
Dave Harris	33	86	21	.244	5	13
Bill Hunnefield	31	81	22	.272	1	5
Alex Metzler	56	79	14	.177	0	5
Ernie Smith	24	79	19	.241	0	3
Chick Autry	34	71	18	.254	0	5
Moe Berg	20	61	7	.115	0	7
Johnny Riddle	25	58	14	.241	0	4
Jimmy Moore	16	39	8	.205	0	2
Luke Appling	6	26	8	.308	0	2
Bruce Campbell	5	10	5	.500	0	5
Butch Henline	3	8	1	.125	0	2
Joe Klinger	4	8	3	.375	0	1
Hugh Willingham	3	4	1	.250	0	0

=== Pitching ===
==== Starting pitchers ====
Note: G = Games pitched; IP = Innings pitched; W = Wins; L = Losses; ERA = Earned run average; SO = Strikeouts

Player	G	IP	W	L	ERA	SO
Ted Lyons	42	297.2	22	15	3.78	69
Red Faber	29	169.0	8	13	4.21	62
Tommy Thomas	34	169.0	5	13	5.22	58

==== Other pitchers ====
Note: G = Games pitched; IP = Innings pitched; W = Wins; L = Losses; ERA = Earned run average; SO = Strikeouts

Player	G	IP	W	L	ERA	SO
Pat Caraway	38	193.1	10	10	3.86	83
Dutch Henry	35	155.0	2	17	4.88	35
Garland Braxton	19	90.2	4	10	6.45	44
Jim Moore	9	40.0	2	1	3.60	11
Bob Weiland	14	32.2	0	4	6.61	15

==== Relief pitchers ====
Note: G = Games pitched; W = Wins; L = Losses; SV = Saves; ERA = Earned run average; SO = Strikeouts

Player	G	W	L	SV	ERA	SO
Ed Walsh Jr.	37	1	4	0	5.38	37
Hal McKain	32	6	4	4	5.56	52
Ted Blankenship	7	2	1	0	9.20	2
Biggs Wehde	4	0	0	0	9.95	3
