= Elliot Bigelow =

American baseball player (1897–1933)

- Outfielder
- Born: October 13, 1897; Tarpon Springs, Florida, U.S.
- Died: August 10, 1933 (aged 35); Tampa, Florida, U.S.
- Batted: Left Threw: Left

MLB debut
- April 18, 1929, for the Boston Red Sox

Last MLB appearance
- October 6, 1929, for the Boston Red Sox

MLB statistics
- Batting average: .284
- Home runs: 1
- Runs batted in: 26
- Stats at Baseball Reference

Teams
- Boston Red Sox (1929)

Elliott Allardice Bigelow (October 13, 1897 – August 10, 1933) was an American right fielder in Major League Baseball who played for the Boston Red Sox. Bigelow batted and threw left-handed. He was born in Tarpon Springs, Florida.

Bigelow was obtained by the Boston Red Sox from the Washington Senators in the same trade that brought Buddy Myer to Washington. He debuted on April 18, 1929 and played his final game on October 6, 1929.

In his only major league season, Bigelow posted a .284 batting average (60-for-211) with one home run, 16 doubles, 23 runs, and 26 RBI in 100 games played.

== Early life ==
Bigelow was born to William and Margaret Bigelow in Tarpon Springs, Florida. On October 13, 1897, as the youngest of three children. His father was a horticulturalist, a native of Iowa whose father was from New York and whose mother was from Vermont. The Bigelow's first child was a daughter, Helen, born in March 1894. Elliot's brother, John, was born in September 1896. Elliot went to the public schools in Tarpon Springs for 10 years and attended a college preparatory school at Mount Hermon School in Northfield, Massachusetts for about two years.

Elliot registered for the draft during World War I, describing himself as a citrus farmer.

== Beginnings in baseball ==
Bigelow started playing baseball with his brother John in 1913 (him as a pitcher/outfielder and his brother as an infielder) playing for his hometown team in Tarpon Springs, FL. After the war, he began his professional career playing for the St. Petersburg Saints in 1920. He hit an average of .287 that year, hitting 10 home runs. Over the next three years with the Saints his hitting improved even more, batting .315 in 1921 and .343 in 1922. In 1923, Bigelow played for the Macon Peaches in the South Atlantic League, finishing that year batting .367 over the course of 17 games. Beginning the 1924 season as a prospective starter for the New Orleans Pelicans during their spring training, Bigelow eventually returned to St. Petersburg where he would bat a league high .388 with 12 home runs, 10 triples, and 30 doubles. Bigelow would also score a league-high 85 runs that season.

After that league disbanded in August of the same year, Bigelow became a free agent, receiving invitations from several teams, including the Philadelphia Phillies, to train with them in the spring. Some teams were hard pressed to commit to Bigelow however with concerns over the condition of his pitching arm. Bigelow eventually secured a $1,000 bonus and signed with the Southern Association's Chattanooga Lookouts for the 1925 season. He played for the Lookouts in 1925 and 1926, batting .349 and .370 respectively.

== Major league saga ==
In November 1928, the Washington Senators bought six players from the Southern Association, Bigelow included. The Red Sox had later acquired Bigelow in a trade with the Senators on December 15, 1928, after batting for .395 for Birmingham. He had previously batted .361 in 1927 (in addition to receiving the Southern Association's RBI crown) and .349 in 1926. Washington traded Bigelow, along with pitcher Hod Lisenbee, Grant Gillis, Milt Gaston, and Bobby Reeves, in a deal that returned Buddy Myer, who had previously been traded to the Red Sox in May 1927, to the Senators. When asked about his thinking in trading Bigelow, Senators’ manager Walter Johnson said that “Bigelow, while his hitting may give him a chance of earning a regular berth on Carrigan’s team [the Red Sox], would have been a utility hitter at best with us, unless the information I have picked up about him is all wrong. There is no question but what he is a natural slugger; his average of over .390 in Birmingham proves that, but he is a big, slow fellow with a mighty poor throwing arm.” Bigelow only played a single season in the major leagues, playing an even 100 games in the 1929 season, beginning on opening day and lasting through the last game of the schedule. Despite hitting a respectable .284, the Red Sox released Bigelow back to the minor leagues for the 1930 season. He played for an additional three years, batting for .343 for the course of 1,553 at bats. Despite this however, he never got to see a return to the major leagues. Bigelow finished out his 12-season minor league career batting an average of .349.

== Return to the Minors ==
After his 1929 season with the pros, Bigelow returned to free agency in the minor leagues. In 1930, Bigelow played for two teams, once again with the Lookouts and for the first time in the Pacific Coast League with the Mission Reds. His return to Chattanooga saw him hitting for a respectable .331. Unfortunately, when he was sold to the Mission Reds later that season, his batting average dipped to under .300, the first time in over 10 years (albeit just barely under, at .298). The Associated Press described him similarly to Johnson had in earlier years, describing him as “a great natural hitter, but a poor fielder and worse at throwing.” In 1931, Bigelow played once again for the Lookouts, playing 150 games and batting for .371 with 603 at bats.

After his 1931 season with the Lookouts, Bigelow won free agency and saw play with the Knoxville Smokies by the beginning of the 1932 season. Bigelow played 155 games with the Smokies, batting .327, hitting 13 home runs, 12 triples, and 37 doubles. This ended up being Bigelow's final bout with professional ball.

== Later life and death ==
After his baseball career came to an end, Bigelow took up commercial fishing, working mainly off the west coast of Florida in the Gulf of Mexico. Unfortunately, less than a year after his retirement from baseball, Bigelow died of cerebrospinal meningitis on August 10, 1933, at the Tampa Memorial Hospital. He was 35 years old.
