= Ray Treadaway =

American baseball player (1907–1935)

- Third baseman
- Born: October 31, 1907; Ragland, Alabama
- Died: October 12, 1935 (aged 27); Chattanooga, Tennessee
- Batted: Left Threw: Right

MLB debut
- September 17, 1930, for the Washington Senators

Last MLB appearance
- September 26, 1930, for the Washington Senators

MLB statistics
- Games played: 6
- Batting average: .211
- Runs batted in: 1
- Stats at Baseball Reference

Teams
- Washington Senators (1930)

Edgar Raymond Treadaway (October 31, 1907 – October 12, 1935) was a third baseman in Major League Baseball who played in six games late in the season for the 1930 Washington Senators.

Treadaway died at the age 27 on October 12, 1935, three months after being shot in the leg during a bar fight.
