= Charlie Perkins (baseball) =

American baseball player (1905-1988)

- Pitcher
- Born: September 9, 1905; Ensley, Alabama
- Died: May 25, 1988 (aged 82); Salem, Oregon
- Batted: Right Threw: Left

MLB debut
- June 27, 1930, for the Philadelphia Athletics

Last MLB appearance
- May 24, 1934, for the Brooklyn Dodgers

MLB statistics
- Win–loss record: 0–3
- Earned run average: 7.50
- Strikeouts: 20
- Stats at Baseball Reference

Teams
- Philadelphia Athletics (1930); Brooklyn Dodgers (1934)

Charles Sullivan Perkins (September 9, 1905 – May 25, 1988), nicknamed "Lefty", was a pitcher in Major League Baseball. He pitched for the 1930 Philadelphia Athletics and the 1934 Brooklyn Dodgers. He attended Williams College. He died on May 25, 1988, and his remains were cremated.
