= Buddy Dear =

American baseball player (1905-1989)

- Second baseman/Pinch runner
- Born: December 1, 1905; Norfolk, Virginia
- Died: August 29, 1989 (aged 83); Radford, Virginia
- Batted: Right Threw: Right

MLB debut
- September 9, 1927, for the Washington Senators

Last MLB appearance
- September 11, 1927, for the Washington Senators

MLB statistics
- Games played: 2
- At bats: 1
- Hits: 0
- Stats at Baseball Reference

Teams
- Washington Senators (1927)

Paul Stanford "Buddy" Dear (December 1, 1905 – August 29, 1989) was a Major League Baseball player who played in two games for the Washington Senators in 1927. He was used as a pinch runner and second baseman. He was a star two-sport athlete at Virginia Tech in the mid-1920s. During his junior year in 1926 he came close to hitting .400 before breaking his leg in a late season game. As a senior, he led the Hokie baseball team to a perfect 8–0 record against other Virginia collegiate teams and an overall mark of 11–4. He was in the third class elected to the Virginia Tech Sports Hall of Fame in 1984. He was a native of Norfolk, VA.
