= Clay Van Alstyne =

American baseball player (1900–1960)

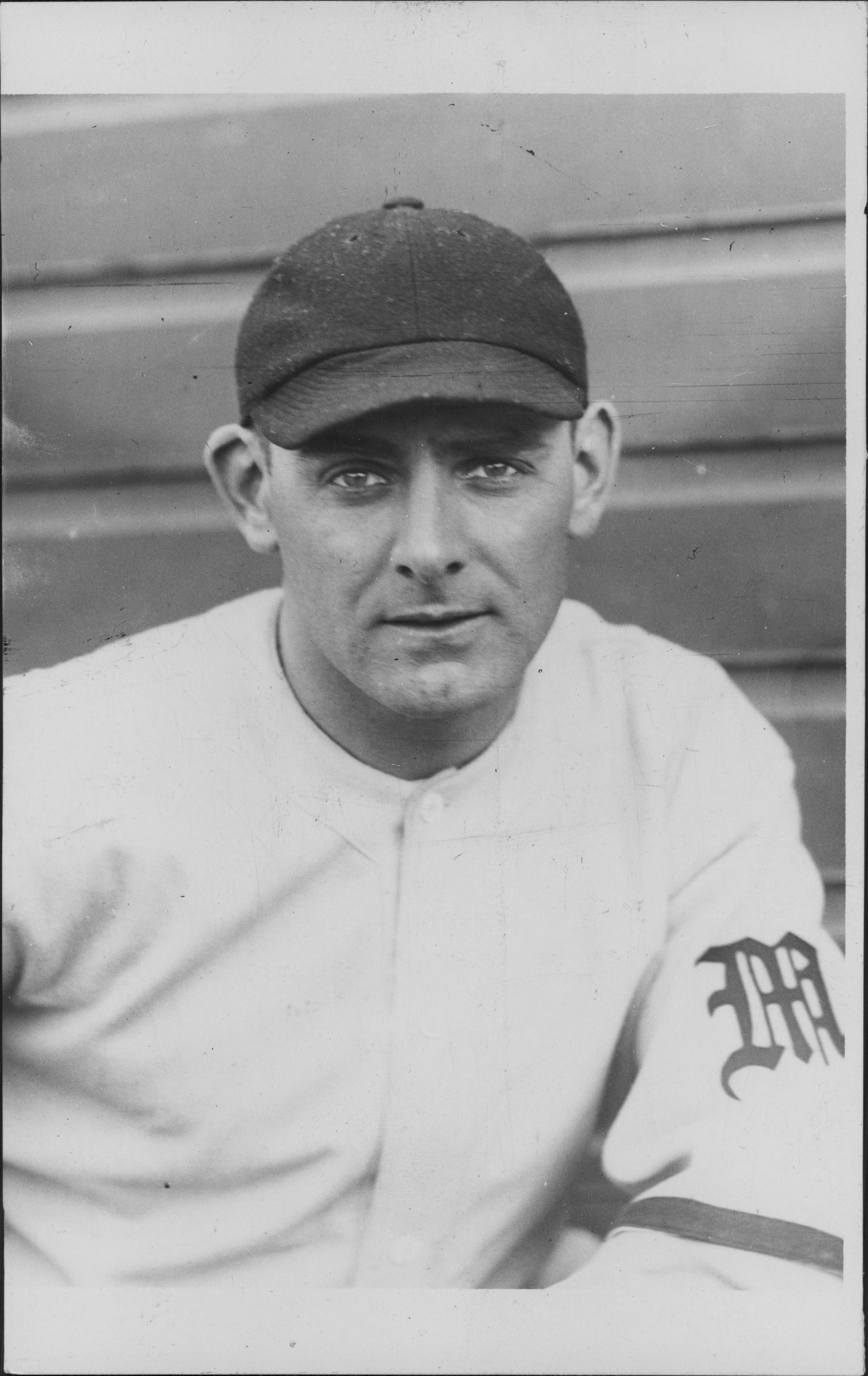
- Pitcher
- Born: May 24, 1900; Stuyvesant, New York, U.S.
- Died: January 5, 1960 (aged 59); Hudson, New York, U.S.
- Batted: Right Threw: Right

MLB debut
- August 20, 1927, for the Washington Senators

Last MLB appearance
- May 7, 1928, for the Washington Senators

MLB statistics
- Win–loss record: 0–0
- Earned run average: 5.18
- Strikeouts: 5
- Stats at Baseball Reference

Teams
- Washington Senators (1927–1928)

Clayton Emory Van Alstyne (May 24, 1900 – January 5, 1960) was an American professional baseball pitcher. He played professionally from 1923 to 1933, including parts of two seasons in Major League Baseball (MLB) with the Washington Senators.
