= Ed Carroll =

American baseball player (1907–1984)

- Pitcher
- Born: July 27, 1907; Baltimore, Maryland
- Died: October 13, 1984 (aged 77); Rossville, Maryland
- Batted: Right Threw: Right

MLB debut
- May 1, 1929, for the Boston Red Sox

Last MLB appearance
- October 5, 1929, for the Boston Red Sox

MLB statistics
- Win–loss record: 1-0
- Strikeouts: 13
- Earned run average: 5.61
- Stats at Baseball Reference

Teams
- Boston Red Sox (1929)

Edgar Fleischer Carroll (July 27, 1907 – October 13, 1984) was a pitcher in Major League Baseball. Listed at 6 ft 3 in (1.91 m), 185 lb., Carroll batted and threw right-handed. He was born in Baltimore, Maryland.

Carroll played briefly for the 1929 Boston Red Sox who finished in last place in the American League, winning only 58 games and losing 96, 48 games behind the Philadelphia Athletics champions. Used mostly as a middle reliever and occasional starter, Carroll posted a 1–0 record with 13 strikeouts and a 5.61 ERA in 24 appearances, including three starts and 67.1 innings pitched. He also ranked 10th in the league with 13 games finished.

Carroll died in Rossville, Maryland, at age 77.

== Sources ==
- Career statistics from Baseball Reference
- Retrosheet
