= Ed Connolly (pitcher) =

American baseball player (1939–1998)

- Pitcher
- Born: December 3, 1939; Brooklyn, New York, U.S.
- Died: July 1, 1998 (aged 58); New Canaan, Connecticut, U.S.
- Batted: Left Threw: Left

MLB debut
- April 19, 1964, for the Boston Red Sox

Last MLB appearance
- September 5, 1967, for the Cleveland Indians

MLB statistics
- Win–loss record: 6–12
- Earned run average: 5.88
- Strikeouts: 118
- Innings pitched: 130
- Stats at Baseball Reference

Teams
- Boston Red Sox (1964); Cleveland Indians (1967)

Edward Joseph Connolly Jr. (December 3, 1939 – July 1, 1998) was an American pitcher in Major League Baseball who played for the Boston Red Sox (1964) and Cleveland Indians (1967). Listed as 6 feet 1 inch (1.85 m) tall and 190 pounds (86 kg), Connolly batted and threw left-handed. He was born in Brooklyn, New York. His father, Ed Sr., a catcher, also played briefly in the majors.

Connolly attended the University of Massachusetts Amherst, and signed with the Red Sox before the 1961 season. In his two-season MLB career, Connolly posted a 6–12 record with 118 strikeouts and a 5.88 ERA in 42 appearances, including 19 starts, one complete game, one shutout, and 130 innings of work. He allowed 143 hits and 98 bases on balls. His shutout came on September 15, 1964, against the Kansas City Athletics at Fenway Park, a two-hit, 8–0 win in which Connolly fanned 12 hitters.

During his minor league career, Connolly struck out 192 batters in 167 innings in 1962 (a season he split between the Class D New York–Penn League and the Class B Carolina League), and he fanned 157 men in 162 innings in 1963 pitching in the Double-A Eastern League.

Connolly died in New Canaan, Connecticut, at the age of 58.

== See also ==
- List of second-generation Major League Baseball players
