= Harry Child (baseball) =

American baseball player (1905-1972)

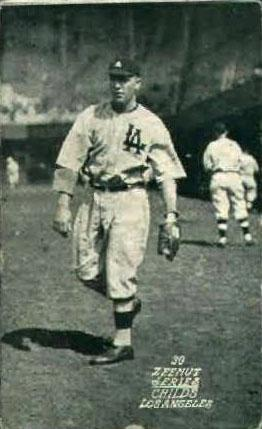
- Pitcher
- Born: May 23, 1905; Baltimore, Maryland
- Died: November 8, 1972 (aged 67); Alexandria, Virginia
- Batted: Both Threw: Right

MLB debut
- July 16, 1930, for the Washington Senators

Last MLB appearance
- September 11, 1930, for the Washington Senators

MLB statistics
- Win–loss record: 0–0
- Strikeouts: 5
- Earned run average: 6.30
- Stats at Baseball Reference

Teams
- Washington Senators (1930)

Harry Stephen Patrick Child (born Harry Stephen Patrick Chesley) (May 23, 1905 – November 8, 1972) was an American professional baseball player who played one season in the Major Leagues. The right-handed pitcher appeared in five games for the Washington Senators in 1930. He was born in Baltimore, Maryland, stood 5 feet 11 inches (1.80 m) tall and weighed 187 pounds (85 kg). He attended Loyola University Maryland.

Child's pro career lasted three seasons, beginning in 1928. In his 1930 stint with Washington, he pitched exclusively in relief and allowed seven hits, seven earned runs, and five bases on balls in ten full innings pitched. He recorded five strikeouts.

Child died at the age of 67 in Alexandria, Virginia.
