= Alex Gaston =

American baseball player (1893–1979)

- Catcher
- Born: March 12, 1893; New York, New York, U.S.
- Died: February 8, 1979 (aged 85); Marina del Rey, California, U.S.
- Batted: Right Threw: Right

MLB debut
- September 26, 1920, for the New York Giants

Last MLB appearance
- September 28, 1929, for the Boston Red Sox

MLB statistics
- Batting average: .218
- Home runs: 3
- Runs batted in: 40
- Stats at Baseball Reference

Teams
- New York Giants (1920–1923); Boston Red Sox (1926, 1929)

Alexander Nathaniel Gaston (March 12, 1893 – February 8, 1979) was an American catcher in Major League Baseball who played between 1920 and 1929 for the New York Giants (1920–1923) and Boston Red Sox (1926, 1929). Listed at 5 ft 9 in (1.75 m), 170 lb., Gaston batted and threw right-handed. He was born in New York City. His younger brother, Milt Gaston, was a major league pitcher.

Gaston grew up in Ridgefield Park, New Jersey and attended Ridgefield Park High School.

In a six-season career, Gaston was a .218 hitter (112-for-514) with three home runs and 40 runs batted in in 215 games, including 58 runs, 13 doubles, six triples, and five stolen bases.

Although the New York Giants won the World Series in 1921 and 1922, Gaston did not see postseason action in either year. Alex Gaston was a batterymate of his brother Milt Gaston with the 1929 Boston Red Sox.

Gaston died in Marina del Rey, California at age 85.
