= Jack Ryan (outfielder) =

American baseball player (1905–1967)

- Outfielder
- Born: May 5, 1905; West Mineral, Kansas
- Died: September 2, 1967 (aged 62); Rochester, Minnesota
- Batted: Right Threw: Right

MLB debut
- June 18, 1929, for the Boston Red Sox

Last MLB appearance
- June 20, 1929, for the Boston Red Sox

MLB statistics
- Batting average: .000
- Games played: 2
- At bats: 3
- Stats at Baseball Reference

Teams
- Boston Red Sox (1929)

John Francis Ryan (May 5, 1905 – September 2, 1967) was a reserve outfielder in Major League Baseball who played briefly for the Boston Red Sox during the 1929 season. Listed at 6 ft 0 in (1.83 m), 185 lb., Ryan batted and threw right-handed. He was born in West Mineral, Kansas.

Little is known about this LF/RF who played on a Red Sox uniform with few stars. The team finished last with a 58–96 record and only 394,620 fans came to see them play at Fenway Park that season. Ryan appeared in two games and went hitless in three at-bats, as he did not commit error in his only fielding chance.

Ryan died at the age of 62 in Rochester, Minnesota.
