= Bill Regan (baseball) =

American baseball player (1899–1968)

- Second baseman
- Born: January 23, 1899; Pittsburgh, Pennsylvania, U.S.
- Died: June 11, 1968 (aged 69); Pittsburgh, Pennsylvania, U.S.
- Batted: Right Threw: Right

MLB debut
- June 2, 1926, for the Boston Red Sox

Last MLB appearance
- June 14, 1931, for the Pittsburgh Pirates

MLB statistics
- Batting average: .267
- Home runs: 18
- Runs batted in: 292
- Stats at Baseball Reference

Teams
- Boston Red Sox (1926–1930); Pittsburgh Pirates (1931)

William Wright Regan (January 23, 1899 – June 11, 1968) was an American professional baseball second baseman. He played in Major League Baseball (MLB) from 1926 to 1931 for the Boston Red Sox and Pittsburgh Pirates.

A native of Pittsburgh, Pennsylvania, Regan was a World War I veteran who played semi-pro baseball before starting his professional career in 1922. He played for the Kitchener and Flint teams of the Michigan-Ontario League, and later moved on to the Columbus Senators of the American Association. In 1925 hit a .298 batting average for Columbus, and .317 in 38 games in 1926, before joining the Boston Red Sox at midseason to become the team's regular second baseman for the next five years.

Basically a line drive hitter and baserunner, Regan had good contact and was able to convert his gap line drives into extra bases.

In 1927 he recorded career-numbers with 37 doubles and 10 triples, while hitting .274 in 129 games.

His most productive season came in 1928, when he posted career-highs with seven home runs and 75 RBI, while collecting 30 doubles and six triples. On June 16 of that year, he came to bat twice in an inning and homered both times. His second was an inside-the-park homer, as he equaled his HR output of the previous season. Besides this, he was considered in the American League MVP vote in both years.

In 1929 Regan hit a career-high .288, while collecting 54 RBI. A year later he was still productive hitting 35 doubles, and 10 triples. He also played with the Pirates in 1931, his last major league season.

In 1930, Regan became Babe Ruth's final strikeout victim when he returned to the mound after nine years in the final game of the 1930 season.

In a six-year career, Regan was a .267 hitter (632-for-2364) with 18 home runs and 292 RBI in 641 games, including 236 runs, 158 doubles, 36 triples, 38 stolen bases, and a .306 on-base percentage. He made 610 appearances at second base, and committed 138 errors in 3610 chances for a .965 fielding percentage. Eventually, he appeared in 14 games at third base (12), first (1), and right field (1).

Regan later played in the International League for the Baltimore Orioles, Buffalo Bisons, Montreal Royals and Toronto Maple Leafs, before ending his career in 1935 with the Birmingham Barons of the Southern Association. While in Baltimore, he hit a career-high .321.

Following his retirement, Regan worked in the Allegheny County (PA) police department for 20 years and also joined the armed forces during World War II.

Regan died in his homeland of Pittsburgh, Pennsylvania, at the age of 69.

== See also ==
- List of Major League Baseball single-inning home run leaders
