= Ed Durham =

American baseball player (1907–1976)

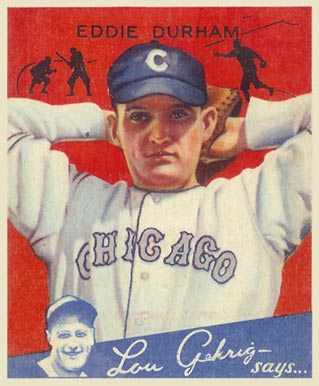
- Pitcher
- Born: August 17, 1907; Chester, South Carolina, U.S.
- Died: April 27, 1976 (aged 68); Chester, South Carolina, U.S.
- Batted: Left Threw: Right

MLB debut
- April 19, 1929, for the Boston Red Sox

Last MLB appearance
- September 30, 1933, for the Chicago White Sox

MLB statistics
- Win–loss record: 29–44
- Earned run average: 4.45
- Strikeouts: 204
- Stats at Baseball Reference

Teams
- Boston Red Sox (1929–1932); Chicago White Sox (1933)

Edward Fant "Bull" Durham (August 17, 1907 – April 27, 1976) was an American professional baseball pitcher in Major League Baseball who played from 1929 to 1933 for the Boston Red Sox and Chicago White Sox. Listed at 5 ft 11 in (1.80 m), 170 lb., Durham batted left-handed and threw right-handed. He was born in Chester, South Carolina.

In a five-season career, Durham posted a 29–44 record with 204 strikeouts and a 4.45 earned run average in 143 appearances, including 71 starts, 23 complete games, three shutouts, one save, and 641 2/3 innings pitched.

Durham died in Chester, South Carolina, at the age of 68.
