= Buddy Myer =

American baseball player (1904–1974)

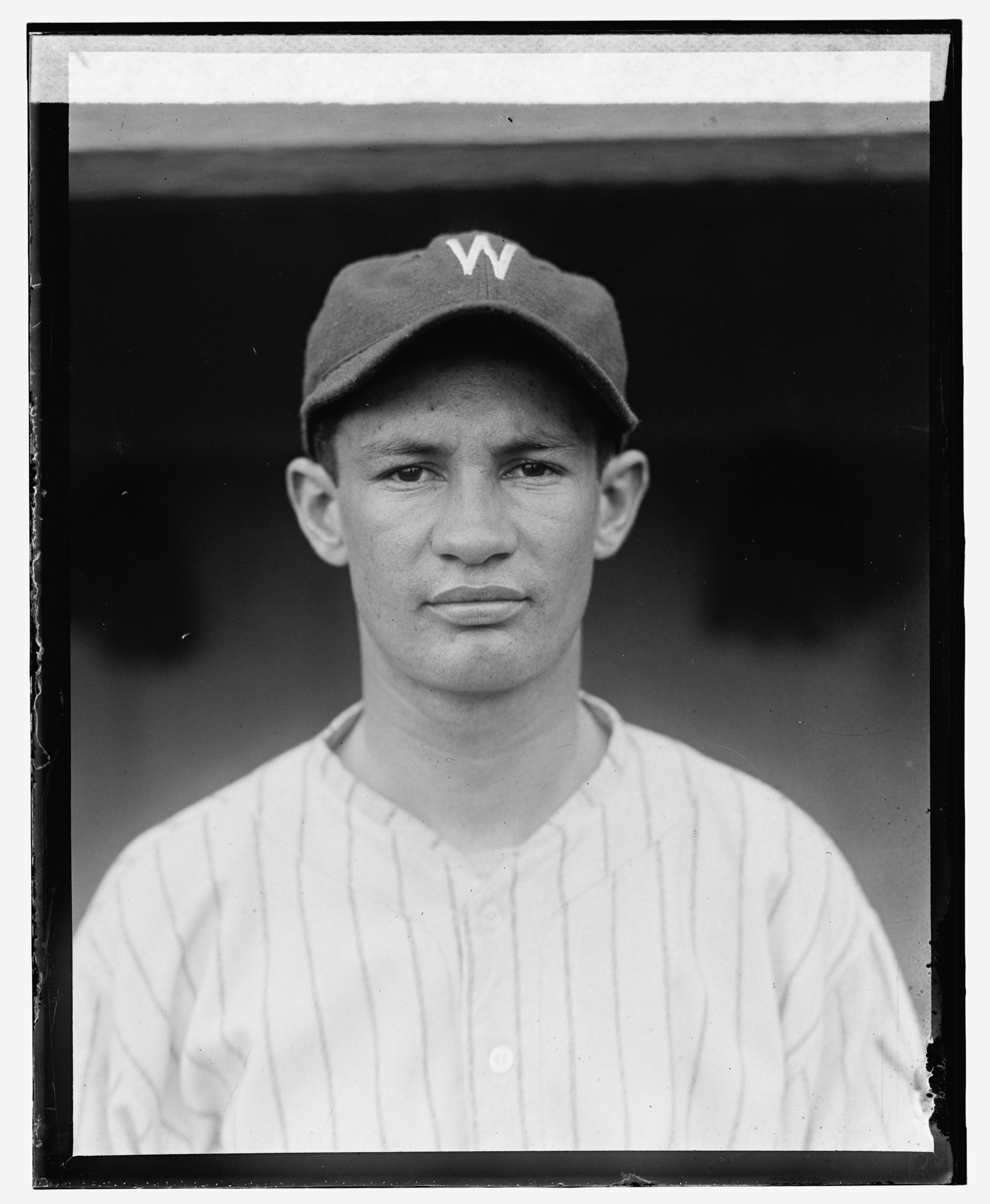
- Second baseman
- Born: March 16, 1904; Ellisville, Mississippi, U.S.
- Died: October 31, 1974 (aged 70); Baton Rouge, Louisiana, U.S.
- Batted: Left Threw: Right

MLB debut
- September 26, 1925, for the Washington Senators

Last MLB appearance
- September 24, 1941, for the Washington Senators

MLB statistics
- Batting average: .303
- Hits: 2,131
- Home runs: 38
- Runs batted in: 848
- Stats at Baseball Reference

Teams
- Washington Senators (1925–1927); Boston Red Sox (1927–1928); Washington Senators (1929–1941)

Career highlights and awards
- 2× All-Star (1935, 1937); AL batting champion (1935); AL stolen base leader (1928)

Charles Solomon "Buddy" Myer (March 16, 1904 – October 31, 1974) was an American professional baseball player. He played in Major League Baseball as a second baseman from 1925 through 1941. A two-time All-Star, Myer was notable for being the 1935 American League batting champion and led the American League in stolen bases in 1928. An excellent hitter, he batted .300 or better nine times, and retired with a career average of .303. Myer walked more than twice as many times as he struck out. Apart from a brief period with the Boston Red Sox in 1927–28, he spent his entire career with the Washington Senators.

== Early life ==
Myer was born in Ellisville, Mississippi, the son of Maud (née Stevens) and Charles Solomon Myer, a merchant and cotton buyer. He was of German and English descent. His father's family was of Jewish descent but had converted in an earlier generation. During his lifetime, Myer was incorrectly reported to be Jewish; baseball historian Bill James reported that Myer "told a home-town newspaperman shortly before his death in 1974 that he was not Jewish, he was German."

== Career ==
Myer decided to go to college at Mississippi A&M (now Mississippi State University). He excelled in basketball and baseball, serving as the leadoff shortstop for the latter sport. He is believed to have hit the first grand slam in program history on May 13, 1924, doing so in a 6–4 victory over Ole Miss. He left school in 1925 and attracted attention from the Cleveland Indians, but he was rejected when he wanted a $1,000 bonus. He then went to the training camp for the Double-A team New Orleans Pelicans, who took him on his bonus. The Washington Senators offered him a contract, as discovered by baseball promoter, Joe Engel, who managed the Chattanooga Lookouts at Engel Stadium.

He broke in with the Senators in 1925 at the age of 21, having barely recovered from a spike injury in August; he had two hits in four games. The Senators returned to the World Series, having won their second straight pennant. In Game 2, Ossie Bluege was hit by a pitch. Myer was sent in to play for him at third base and run. He was caught stealing but made up for it in the bottom of the 9th with a single. He played third base for Game 3 and Game 4 before Bluege returned; in total, Myer went 2-for-8 in the series, which Washington lost in seven games.

Myer was tapped to play shortstop for the team in 1926, and he batted .304 with 132 hits and 60 RBIs while also committing 40 errors (he also played eight games at third base and committed two errors). Fifteen games into the 1927 season, with Tris Speaker stating they needed a new shortstop to contend, the team traded away Myer to the Boston Red Sox for Topper Rigney. He batted .281 in 148 games with 146 hits at shortstop that saw him commit 40 errors. Boston moved him over to third base for 1928, where he batted .313 in 147 games with 168 hits and a league-leading 30 stolen bases (on 46 attempts) and even finished 9th place in MVP voting.

After the season, the Senators got him back but had to give up five ballplayers in trade. In December 1928 the Red Sox traded him to the Senators for Milt Gaston, Hod Lisenbee, Bobby Reeves, Grant Gillis, and Elliot Bigelow. Myer was tabbed to play second base for the team. That year, he played 141 games and batted .300 with 169 hits while topping out with his second (and last) season with at least 15 stolen bases and 82 RBIs. He batted well the following year with a .303 season in 138 games and 164 hits to go along with 61 RBIs. He batted .293 in 1931 with 139 games played and 173 hits to go with 56 RBIs before regressing a bit in 1932 with a then-career low .279 average in 143 games while having 161 hits.

In 1933, Myer was involved in what many still consider to be baseball's most violent brawl, between him and the Yankees' Ben Chapman. It is alleged that Chapman – who later gained great infamy for his taunting of Jackie Robinson in 1947, while Chapman was the manager of the Phillies – not only spiked Myer, but hurled a number of antisemitic epithets at him. The two were ejected, but Chapman was not finished, as he punched Senator pitcher Earl Whitehill on his way to the clubhouse that started a swarming and a handful of arrests of fans. The three players each got a five-day suspension and $100 fine (apparently, Myer did not have hard feelings over the matter, as Chapman later played for the Senators three years later). He batted .302 that year with 131 games and finished 15th in MVP voting. The Senators made a run to the pennant, the final one for a Washington team for decades. In the 1933 World Series, Myer had six hits in five games to go along with three errors in Game 1 in a series the Senators lost to the New York Giants.

Myer had another .300 season in 1934 with 139 games of .305 ball that saw him walk a career-high 102 times. Myer (moved from leadoff to batting third in the summer) had a banner year in 1935, having career highs in batting average (.349), hits (215), and RBIs (100) in 151 games that saw him named to the All-Star Game and finish 4th in MVP voting. On the final day of the season, Myer was neck-and-neck with Joe Vosmik (.349) and Jimmie Foxx (.343) for the batting title. Vosmik only entered the first game of the double-header as a pinch hitter late and had just one hit in the shortened second game while Myer got four hits (the last one going after he narrowly fouled off a pitch before lining a double) to narrowly win the title (.349026 to .348387).

Reported stomach trouble (possibly an ulcer) limited him to 51 games the following year before he stopped playing in August, where he batted .269. He played in 125 games for 1937, batting .293 with 126 hits while being named to the All-Star Game for the second and last time. He played 127 games in 1938 for his last regular trip of starts, batting .336 with 147 hits while receiving MVP votes for 24th.

A wrist injury troubled him in 1939, where he batted .302 in 83 games, his 9th and final time eclipsing the .300 mark. He reached 2,000 career hits on May 21 (at the time, only 75 other players had 2,000 or more hits). Having gotten a contract job, he wanted to retire, but ownership implored him to stay, even just as a bench player. He played 71 games in 1940 and 53 games in 1941, mostly playing pinch-hit duty, with his last game being on September 24, 1941.

Myer was inducted into the Mississippi Sports Hall of Fame in 1971 and the Mississippi State University Sports Hall of Fame in 1972. He was inducted into the International Jewish Sports Hall of Fame in 1992.

Historian Bill James argued for the underrated qualities of Myer, comparing him to Billy Herman (who played in the same time as Myer in the National League): the two played roughly the same number of games while Herman had more hits (2345–2131) but the two had similar batting lines (Myer batted .303/.389/.406 while Herman batted .304/.367/.407) but Myer played in the shadow of legendary second baseman of the AL such as Charlie Gehringer and Tony Lazzeri. Myer was inducted into the Washington DC Sports Hall of Fame in 2018. Myer had a plaque dedicated in his honor in his hometown Ellisville at Community Bank Park on April 21, 2018, with his grandson Charles being on hand for the unveiling.

== Personal life and death ==
Myer settled down in Baton Rouge, Louisiana with his wife and children after retirement and joined a mortgage bank to go along with being a church goer as a Baptist. He had a heart attack a few months prior to his death on October 31, 1974 at the age of 70.

== Career statistics ==
Games	PA	AB	R	H	2B	3B	HR	RBI	SB	BB	HBP	AVG	OBP	SLG	FLD%
1923	8189	7038	1174	2131	353	130	38	848	157	965	33	.303	.389	.406	.968

== See also ==
- List of Major League Baseball career hits leaders
- List of Major League Baseball career triples leaders
- List of Major League Baseball career runs scored leaders
- List of Major League Baseball batting champions
- List of Major League Baseball annual stolen base leaders
- List of Major League Baseball career stolen bases leaders
