= Joe Cicero =

American baseball player (1910–1983)

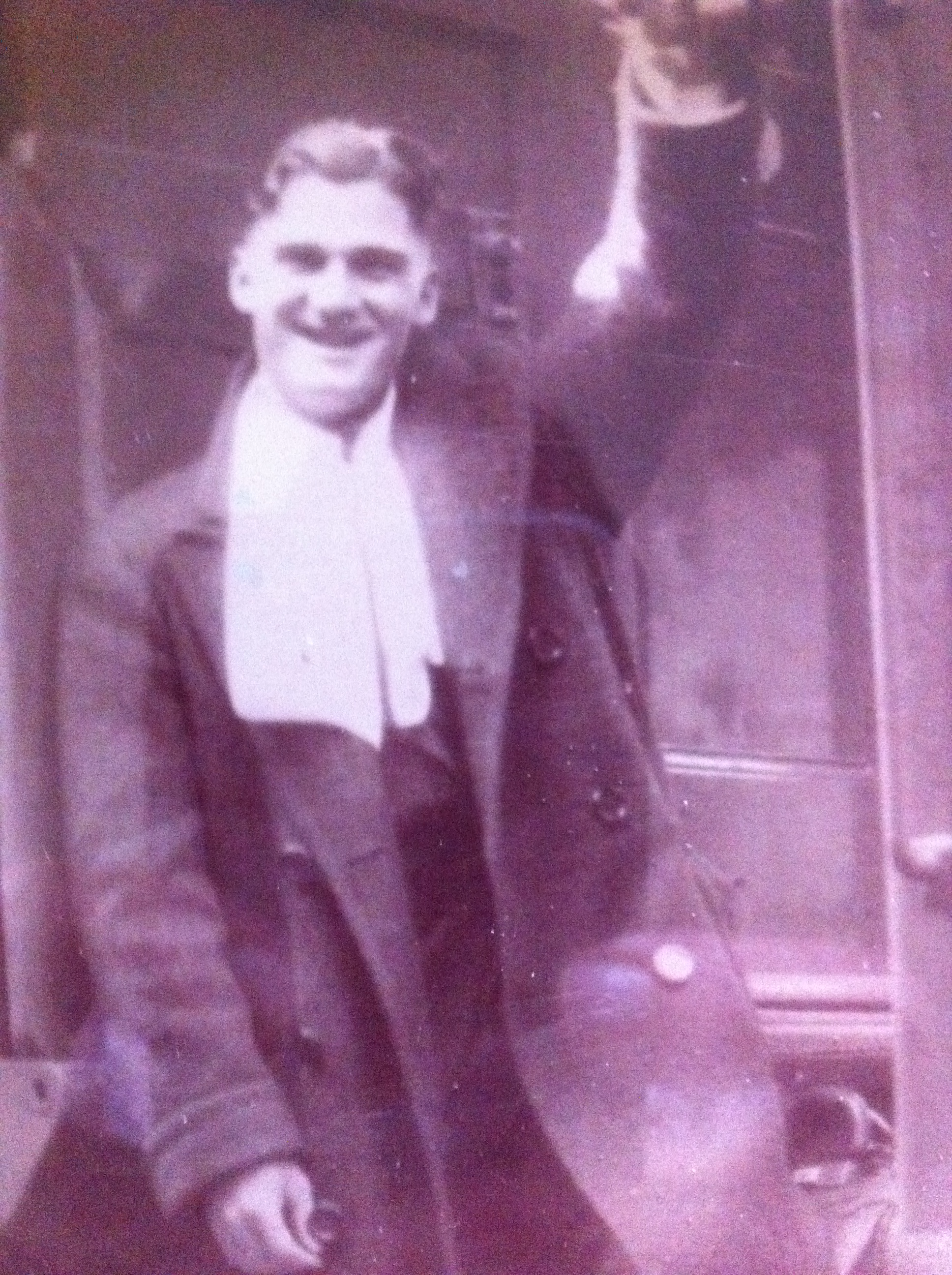
- Cicero leaving home to play pro ball
- Outfielder / Third baseman
- Born: November 18, 1910; Atlantic City, New Jersey, U.S.
- Died: March 30, 1983 (aged 72); Clearwater, Florida, U.S.
- Batted: Right Threw: Right

MLB debut
- September 20, 1929, for the Boston Red Sox

Last MLB appearance
- May 30, 1945, for the Philadelphia Athletics

MLB statistics
- Batting average: .222
- Home runs: 0
- Runs batted in: 8
- Stats at Baseball Reference

Teams
- Boston Red Sox (1929–1930); Philadelphia Athletics (1945)

Joseph Francis Cicero (November 18, 1910 – March 30, 1983) was an American professional baseball player and scout. He was a backup outfielder in Major League Baseball who played for the Boston Red Sox and Philadelphia Athletics. Listed at 5 ft 8 in (1.73 m), Weight 167 lb., Cicero batted and threw right-handed. He was born in Atlantic City, New Jersey and attended Atlantic City High School.

An all-around high school athletic standout, Cicero spent most of his 19-year baseball career in minor league baseball, with two brief stops in the major leagues 15 years apart. He signed a contract with the Boston Red Sox when he was only 16, and reached the majors in 1929 with Boston, hitting .312 with a .500 slugging average in just 10 games, an especially impressive accomplishment given that Cicero was the youngest player in the major leagues that season at age 18. The next season, he hit .167 and also lost his youngest player title to Hank Greenberg. After that, he spent the next 14 years in the minors.

In May 1944, while playing for the Newark Bears of the International League, Cicero hit three home runs in a single game, including two grand slams and 10 RBI, to lead his team to a 17–8 victory over the Montreal Royals. At the end of the season he was signed by Philadelphia Athletics, appearing for them in 12 games during 1945, his last major league season.

In 1945 he set a (post-1914) record for a gap of over 14 years between major league hits.

In three major league seasons, Cicero hit .222 (18-for-81) in 40 games, including eight RBI, 14 runs, three doubles, and four triples without any home runs.

A vision problem prevented Cicero from serving in the military during World War II. During the baseball off-season he played semipro football, played winter league baseball in Panama until 1952, and served as a scout for the Brooklyn Dodgers between 1953 and 1954.

Cicero died in Clearwater, Florida, at the age of 72. He was a first cousin of legendary actor Clark Gable.

== See also ==
- Boston Red Sox all-time roster

== Sources ==
- Baseball Library
- Baseball Reference
- Retrosheet
- This Day in Baseball History
- The Deadball Era
