= Johnnie Heving =

American baseball player (1896–1968)

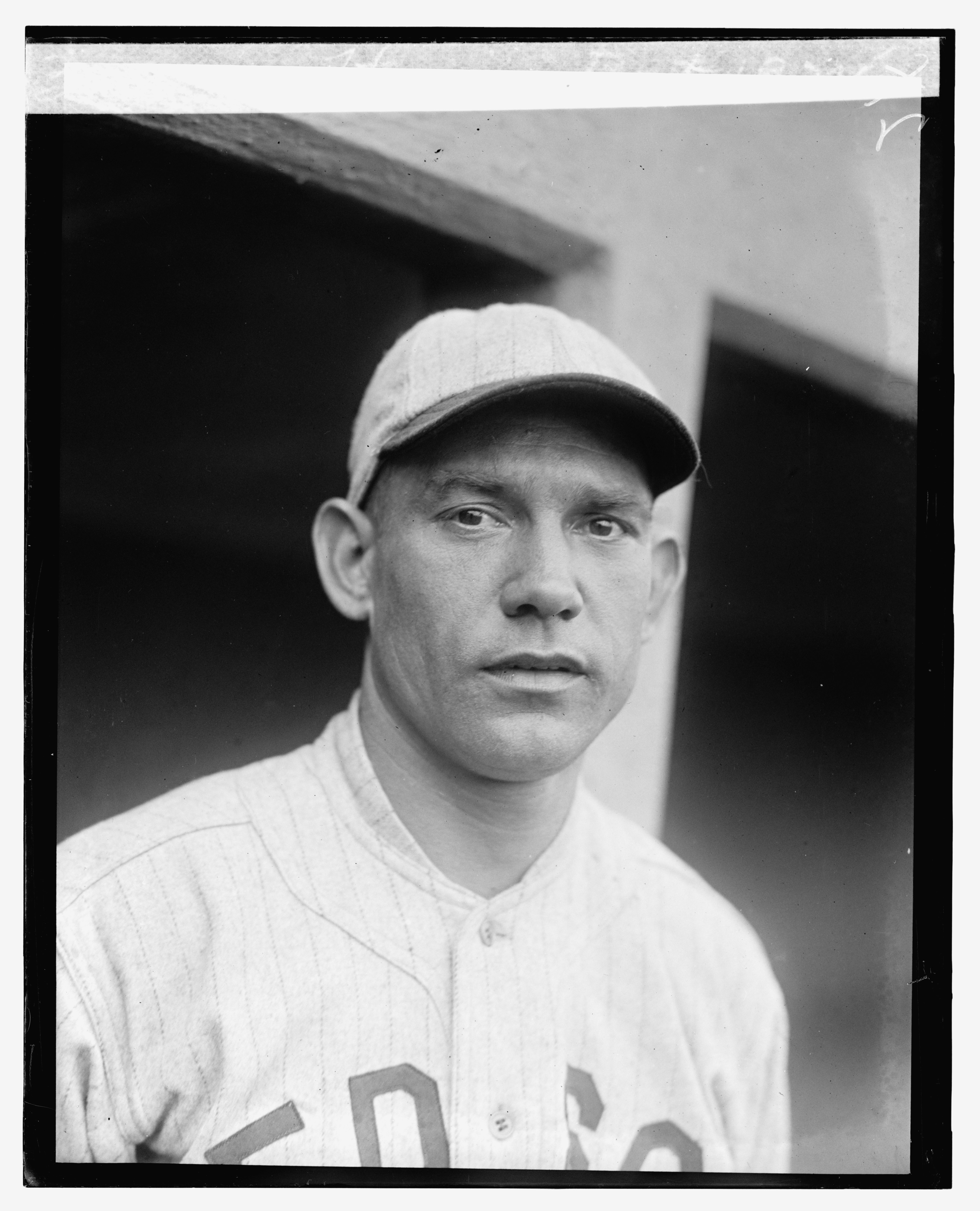
- Catcher
- Born: April 29, 1896; Covington, Kentucky, U.S.
- Died: December 24, 1968 (aged 72); Salisbury, North Carolina, U.S.
- Batted: Right Threw: Right

MLB debut
- September 24, 1920, for the St. Louis Browns

Last MLB appearance
- September 5, 1932, for the Philadelphia Athletics

MLB statistics
- Batting average: .265
- Home runs: 1
- Runs batted in: 90
- Stats at Baseball Reference

Teams
- St. Louis Browns (1920); Boston Red Sox (1924–1925, 1928–1930); Philadelphia Athletics (1931–1932)

John Aloysius Heving (April 29, 1896 – December 24, 1968) was an American professional baseball catcher. He played all or part of eight season in Major League Baseball (MLB) for the St. Louis Browns, Boston Red Sox, and Philadelphia Athletics. His younger brother, Joe, was a major league pitcher from 1930 to 1945.

== Major league career ==
=== Browns and Red Sox ===
A non-power hitting backup catcher, Having reached the majors in 1920 with the St. Louis Browns, appearing in one game with them. He spent the next three seasons out of professional baseball before returning to the majors with the Boston Red Sox in 1924–25. After spending 1926–27 with the minor league Toledo Mud Hens, he returned to the Red Sox in 1928–30. His most productive season came in 1929 with Boston, when he posted career highs in batting average (.319) and runs batted in (23) in 76 games played.

=== Athletics ===
After the 1930 season, he was claimed on waivers by the Philadelphia Athletics, for whom he played in 1931–32. He hit his only major league home run for the A's on June 13, 1931, against his old team, the Browns, and pitcher Lefty Stewart.

== Minor leagues ==
In 1933, he returned to the minor leagues once again with the Toronto Maple Leafs. He continued to play on and off in the minors until 1946. From 1940 to 1942, he served as player-manager of the Salisbury Giants of the North Carolina State League.

In an eight-season major league career, Heving was a .265 hitter (261-for-985) with one home run and 90 RBI in 399 games.

Heving died in Salisbury, North Carolina, at the age of 72.
