= Russ Scarritt =

American baseball player (1903–1994)

- Left fielder
- Born: January 14, 1903; Pensacola, Florida, U.S.
- Died: December 4, 1994 (aged 91); Pensacola, Florida, U.S.
- Batted: Left Threw: Left

MLB debut
- April 18, 1929, for the Boston Red Sox

Last MLB appearance
- May 25, 1932, for the Philadelphia Phillies

MLB statistics
- Batting average: .285
- Home runs: 3
- Runs batted in: 120
- Stats at Baseball Reference

Teams
- Boston Red Sox (1929–1931); Philadelphia Phillies (1932)

Stephen Russell Mallory Scarritt (January 14, 1903 – December 4, 1994) was an American left fielder in Major League Baseball who played from 1929 through 1932 for the Boston Red Sox (1929–1931) and Philadelphia Phillies (1933). Listed at 5 ft 10 in (1.78 m), 165 lb, Scarritt batted left-handed and threw right-handed. A native of Pensacola, Florida, he attended University of Florida.

In a four-season career, Scarritt was a .285 hitter (296-for-1037) with three home runs and 120 RBI in 285 games, including 119 runs, 44 doubles, 25 triples and a 17 stolen bases. In 265 outfield appeared, he collected a .956 fielding percentage (28 errors in 631 chances).

Scarritt died at the age of 91 in his home town of Pensacola, Florida.

== Milestone ==
- In 1929, Scarrit hit 17 triples, setting a record for a Red Sox rookie during a regular season that still stands.
