= Phil Todt =

American baseball player (1901–1973)

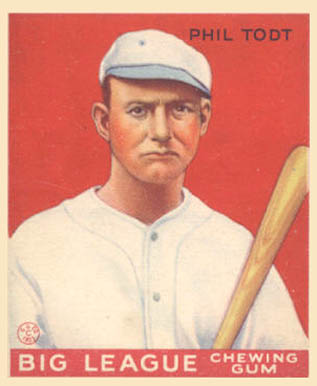
- First baseman
- Born: August 9, 1901; St. Louis, Missouri, U.S.
- Died: November 15, 1973 (aged 72); St. Louis, Missouri, U.S.
- Batted: Left Threw: Left

MLB debut
- April 25, 1924, for the Boston Red Sox

Last MLB appearance
- September 25, 1931, for the Philadelphia Athletics

MLB statistics
- Batting average: .258
- Home runs: 57
- Runs batted in: 453
- Stats at Baseball Reference

Teams
- Boston Red Sox (1924–1930); Philadelphia Athletics (1931)

Philip Julius Todt (August 9, 1901 – November 15, 1973), nicknamed "Hook", was an American professional baseball first baseman who played in Major League Baseball between the 1924 and 1931 seasons. Listed at 6 ft 0 in (1.83 m), 175 lb., Todt batted and threw left-handed. He was born in Saint Louis, Missouri.

A fine defensive first baseman and consistent line drive hitter, Todt entered the majors in 1924 with the Boston Red Sox, hitting .262 in 52 games as a backup for Joe Harris. Since 1925, Todt provided a solid defensive effort for a Red Sox club that finished last in the American League for six straight seasons. He was considered in the American League MVP vote for three consecutive years (1925–1927), and led the AL first basemen in fielding percentage (.997) in 1928. His most productive season came in 1925, when he hit .278 with 62 runs and 75 RBI, all career-numbers.

In 1930, Todt broke Babe Ruth's team record of 49 career home runs. Todt's record stood until 1937, when Jimmie Foxx broke it in only his second season with the club; the record subsequently passed from Foxx to Ted Williams who still holds it.

Todt also appeared in 62 games with the Philadelphia Athletics in 1931, his last major league season.

In an eight-year career, Todt was a .258 hitter (880-for-3415) with 57 home runs and 453 RBI in 957 games, including 372 runs, 183 doubles, 58 triples, 29 stolen bases, and a .305 on-base percentage. In 904 games at first base, he collected 9079 outs and 623 assists while committing 80 errors in 9782 chances for a .992 fielding percentage. He also played four games in the outfield.

== Personal life ==
Todt's father was a German immigrant who worked and lived at St Peter and St Paul's Cemetery in St. Louis, Missouri; Todt was born in a house in the cemetery. Todt died at the age of 72 in St. Louis, and is buried in the cemetery where he was born.

== Milestone ==
- Todt ranks 3rd on the all-time season leaders with a 12.21 range factor (1926), behind Jiggs Donahue (12.65, 1907; 12.35, 1908) and over George Burns (12.10, 1914) and Stuffy McInnis (12.10, 1918).
