= Jerry Standaert =

American baseball player (1901–1964)

- Infielder
- Born: November 2, 1901; Chicago, Illinois, U.S.
- Died: August 4, 1964 (aged 62); Chicago, Illinois, U.S.
- Batted: Right Threw: Right

MLB debut
- April 16, 1925, for the Brooklyn Robins

Last MLB appearance
- May 30, 1929, for the Boston Red Sox

MLB statistics
- Batting average: .318
- Home runs: 0
- Runs batted in: 18
- Stats at Baseball Reference

Teams
- Brooklyn Robins (1925–1926); Boston Red Sox (1929)

Jerome John Standaert (November 2, 1901 – August 4, 1964) was an American infielder in Major League Baseball who played for the Brooklyn Robins and Boston Red Sox in part of three seasons spanning 1925–1929.

He was born in Chicago, Illinois.
