= Jack Rothrock =

American baseball player (1905–1980)

- Outfielder / Infielder
- Born: March 14, 1905; Long Beach, California, U.S.
- Died: February 2, 1980 (aged 74); San Bernardino, California, U.S.
- Batted: Switch Threw: Right

MLB debut
- July 28, 1925, for the Boston Red Sox

Last MLB appearance
- October 2, 1937, for the Philadelphia Athletics

MLB statistics
- Batting average: .276
- Home runs: 28
- Runs batted in: 327
- Stats at Baseball Reference

Teams
- Boston Red Sox (1925–1932); Chicago White Sox (1932); St. Louis Cardinals (1934–1935); Philadelphia Athletics (1937)

Career highlights and awards
- World Series champion (1934)

Jack Houston Rothrock (March 14, 1905 – February 2, 1980) was an American professional baseball utility player in Major League Baseball who played with four teams between the 1925 and 1937 seasons. Listed at 5 ft 11 in (1.80 m), 165 lb., Rothrock was a switch-hitter who threw right-handed. He was born in Long Beach, California.

Rothrock was a line drive hitter and aggressive baserunner. He entered the majors in 1925 with the Boston Red Sox, playing with them through the 1932 midseason before joining the Chicago White Sox (1932), St. Louis Cardinals (1934–1935) and Philadelphia Athletics (1935, 1937). In 1927 he was considered in the American League MVP vote, then in 1928 played all nine positions, plus pinch-hitting and pinch-running duties. He became just the second American League player ever to play all nine positions in one season.

Rothrock hit a career-high .300 with 23 stolen bases for the 1929 Red Sox, then in 1933 hit .278 with 39 extra-base hits and a .343 on-base percentage. His most productive season came with the 1934 National League champions Cardinals, when he posted career-numbers in home runs (11), runs (106), and RBI (72), while hitting .284 with a .336 OBP and leading the league with 154 games played. He also led the victorious Cardinals with six RBI in the 1934 World Series.

In an 11-season career, Rothrock was a .276 hitter (924-for-3350) with 28 home runs and 327 RBI in 1014 games, including 498 runs, 162 doubles, 35 triples, 75 stolen bases, and a .336 OBP. In 868 fielding appearances, he played at center field (194), left field (138), right field (311), shortstop (78), second base (63), third base (48) and first base (38), as well as a catcher (1) and pitcher (1).

Rothrock died at the age of 74 in San Bernardino, California.
