= Hal Rhyne =

American baseball player (1899–1971)

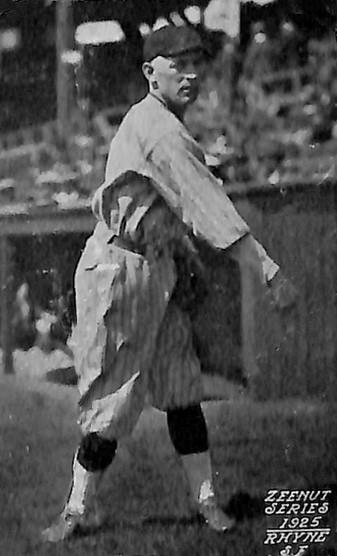
- Infielder
- Born: March 30, 1899; Paso Robles, California, U.S.
- Died: January 7, 1971 (aged 71); Orangevale, California, U.S.
- Batted: Right Threw: Right

MLB debut
- April 18, 1926, for the Pittsburgh Pirates

Last MLB appearance
- October 1, 1933, for the Chicago White Sox

MLB statistics
- Batting average: .250
- Home runs: 2
- Runs batted in: 192
- Stats at Baseball Reference

Teams
- Pittsburgh Pirates (1926–1927); Boston Red Sox (1929–1932); Chicago White Sox (1933)

Harold J. Rhyne (March 30, 1899 – January 7, 1971) was an American professional baseball infielder. He played in Major League Baseball (MLB) from 1926 through 1933 for the Pittsburgh Pirates, Boston Red Sox, and Chicago White Sox.

In a seven-season career, Rhyne was a .250 hitter (508-for-2031) with two home runs and 192 RBI in 655 games, including 252 runs, 98 doubles, 22 triple, and 13 stolen bases. His best season statistically was 1931, when he posted career numbers in average (.273), runs (75), RBI (51), hits (154) and on-base percentage (.341), and also was considered in the American League MVP vote.

Rhyne's minor league career spanned twenty seasons, between 1921 and 1940. After starting his career with the Des Moines Boosters, he joined the San Francisco Seals of the Pacific Coast League. With the exception of the seasons he spent in the majors, he played for the Seals until 1938, when he joined the Tacoma Tigers of the Western International League partway through the season. He played for the Tigers through the end of his professional playing career.

Rhyne is one of only two major leaguers to have been born in Paso Robles, CA. The other is Jason Botts. He died at the age of 71 in Orangevale, California and is buried in Sacramento City Cemetery in Sacramento, California. He has a small, plain headstone.
