= Bill Narleski =

American baseball player (1900–1964)

- Infielder
- Born: March 9, 1900; Perth Amboy, New Jersey, U.S.
- Died: July 20, 1964 (aged 64); Laurel Springs, New Jersey, U.S.
- Batted: Right Threw: Right

MLB debut
- April 18, 1929, for the Boston Red Sox

Last MLB appearance
- June 26, 1930, for the Boston Red Sox

MLB statistics
- Batting average: .265
- Home runs: 0
- Runs batted in: 32
- Stats at Baseball Reference

Teams
- Boston Red Sox (1929–1930)

William Edward Narleski (March 9, 1900 – July 20, 1964) was an American Major League Baseball infielder. Primarily a shortstop, Narleski played two seasons in the majors, 1929 and 1930, for the Boston Red Sox. Listed at 5 ft 9 in (1.75 m), 160 lb., Narleski batted and threw right-handed. He was born in Perth Amboy, New Jersey.

In a two-season career, Narleski, who was nicknamed "Cap", was a .265 hitter (95-for-358) with 41 runs and 32 RBI in 135 games, including 25 doubles, one triple, four stolen bases, and a .326 on-base percentage without home runs.

Narleski's minor league baseball career spanned 25 years, starting in 1921 with the Rocky Mount Tar Heels. He retired for the first time in 1933, but made a two-year comeback during World War II in 1944 and 1945 with the Wilmington Blue Rocks.

Narleski died at the age of 64 in Laurel Springs, New Jersey.

His son, Ray Narleski, also was a major leaguer.

== See also ==
- List of second-generation MLB players
