= Bill Barrett (outfielder) =

American baseball player (1900–1951)

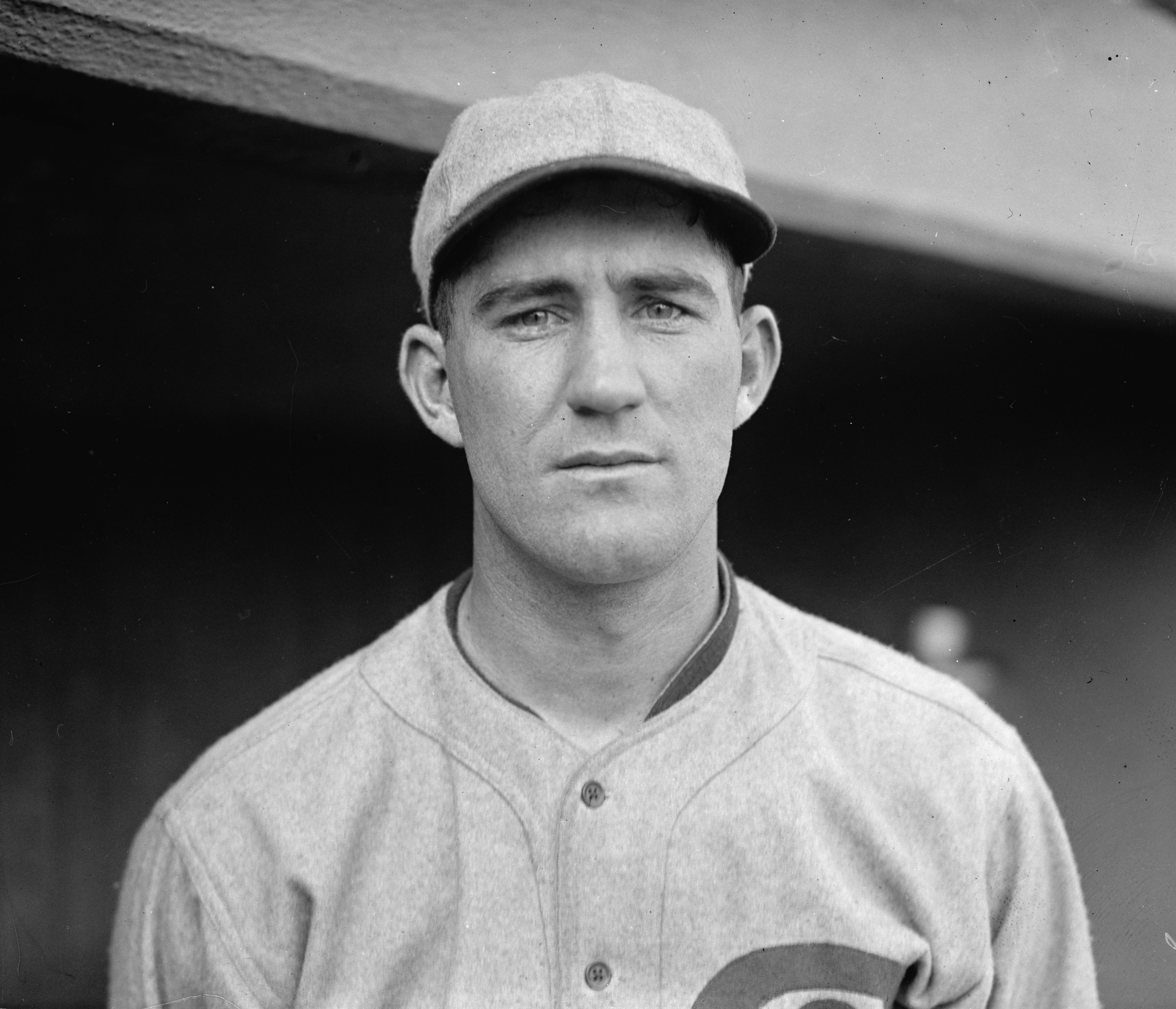
- Outfielder / Second baseman
- Born: May 28, 1900; Cambridge, Massachusetts, U.S.
- Died: January 26, 1951 (aged 50); Cambridge, Massachusetts, U.S.
- Batted: Right Threw: Right

MLB debut
- May 13, 1921, for the Philadelphia Athletics

Last MLB appearance
- May 13, 1930, for the Washington Senators

MLB statistics
- Batting average: .288
- Fielding percentage: .946
- Assists: 502
- Stats at Baseball Reference

Teams
- Philadelphia Athletics (1921); Chicago White Sox (1923–1929); Boston Red Sox (1929–1930); Washington Senators (1930)

William Joseph Barrett (May 28, 1900 – January 26, 1951) was an American outfielder who played in Major League Baseball between 1921 and 1930. Nicknamed "Whispering Bill", he batted and threw right-handed.

== Biography ==
A native of Cambridge, Massachusetts, Barrett was basically a singles hitter who was able to play all positions except catcher, playing mainly as a right fielder for four different teams. He reached the majors in 1921 with the Philadelphia Athletics, spending part of that season with them before moving to the Chicago White Sox (1923–1929), Boston Red Sox (1929–1930) and Washington Senators (1930). He enjoyed his best years as a member of the White Sox, hitting .363 (89-for-245) in 1925 and .307 (113-for-368) in 1926. His most productive season came in 1927, when he hit .286 in a career-high 147 games and led his team in doubles (35), RBI (83), stolen bases (20) and sacrifice hits (26). He also tied a major league mark by stealing home twice, in the 1st and 9th innings, during a single game against the Cleveland Indians (May 1, 1924).

In a nine-season career, Barrett was a .288 hitter (690-for-2395) with 23 home runs and 330 RBI in 718 games, including 318 runs, 151 doubles, 30 triples, 80 stolen bases, and a .347 on-base percentage. As a pitcher, he posted a 1–0 record in four appearances for the Athletics.

In 1937, Barrett played outfield for Harwich in the Cape Cod Baseball League. He finished the season atop the league with a .440 batting average, and it was reported that his "potent bat of bygone glory still carries a mean threat."

Barrett died in his hometown of Cambridge at the age of 50.
