= Ed Connolly (catcher) =

American baseball player (1908–1963)

- Catcher
- Born: July 17, 1908; Brooklyn, New York, U.S.
- Died: November 12, 1963 (aged 55); Pittsfield, Massachusetts, U.S.
- Batted: Right Threw: Right

MLB debut
- September 20, 1929, for the Boston Red Sox

Last MLB appearance
- September 25, 1932, for the Boston Red Sox

MLB statistics
- Fielding percentage: .966
- Putouts: 366
- Assists: 86
- Stats at Baseball Reference

Teams
- Boston Red Sox (1929–1932)

Edward Joseph Connolly (July 17, 1908 – November 12, 1963) was an American backup catcher in Major League Baseball who played his entire career for the Boston Red Sox between 1929 and 1932. Connolly batted and threw right-handed. He was born in Brooklyn, New York. His son, Ed Jr., also played briefly in the majors.

In a four-season career, Connolly was a .178 hitter (66-for-371) with 31 RBI without any home runs in 149 games played.

Connolly died in Pittsfield, Massachusetts, at the age of 55.

== See also ==
- List of second-generation Major League Baseball players
