= Danny MacFayden =

American baseball player (1905–1972)

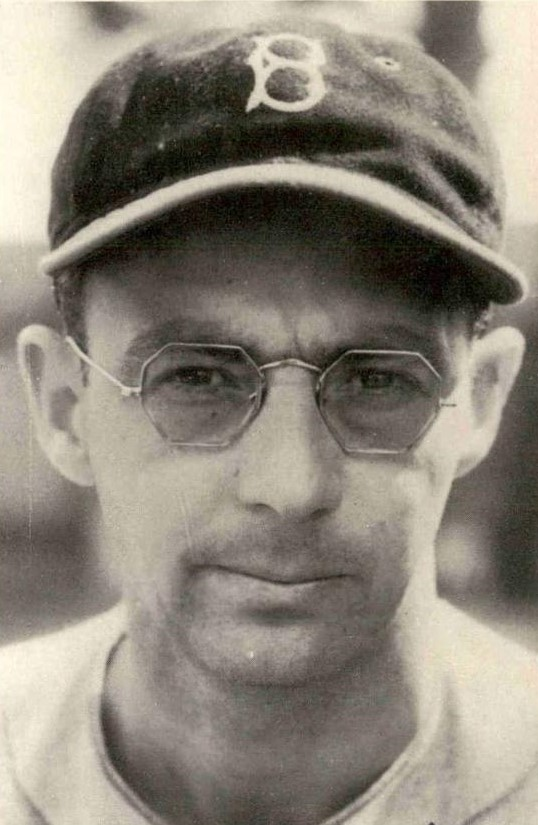
- Pitcher
- Born: June 10, 1905; Truro, Massachusetts, U.S.
- Died: August 26, 1972 (aged 67); Brunswick, Maine, U.S.
- Batted: Right Threw: Right

MLB debut
- August 25, 1926, for the Boston Red Sox

Last MLB appearance
- September 13, 1943, for the Boston Braves

MLB statistics
- Win–loss record: 132–159
- Earned run average: 3.96
- Strikeouts: 797
- Stats at Baseball Reference

Teams
- Boston Red Sox (1926–1932); New York Yankees (1932–1934); Cincinnati Reds (1935); Boston Braves / Bees (1935–1939); Pittsburgh Pirates (1940); Washington Senators (1941); Boston Braves (1943)

Career highlights and awards
- World Series champion (1932)

Daniel Knowles MacFayden (June 10, 1905 – August 26, 1972) was an American starting and relief pitcher in Major League Baseball. From 1926 through 1943, he played for the Boston Red Sox (1926–1932), New York Yankees (1932–1934), Cincinnati Reds (1935), Boston Braves/Bees/Braves (1935–1939, 1943), Pittsburgh Pirates (1940) and Washington Senators (1941). In a 17-season career, he posted a 132–159 record with 797 strikeouts and a 3.96 earned run average in 2706 innings pitched. His best season was 1936, when he earned 17 victories with 86 strikeouts and a 2.87 ERA, all career bests.

He batted and pitched right-handed. His best pitch was a side-arm curveball.

MacFayden's serious demeanor won him the nickname "Deacon Danny", though New York World-Telegram sportswriter Dan Daniel, a harsh critic of his play, called him "Dismal Danny" when he was with the Yankees.

== Early life ==
MacFayden was born in North Truro, Massachusetts, on Cape Cod. In 1920, his mother moved the family to Somerville, located across the Charles River from Boston. His father had died when he was four years old, and they went to live with his mother Sarah's brother, building contractor Joshua Knowles. His uncle eventually adopted Danny.

MacFayden was captain of the Somerville High School baseball team in 1923, a team that boasted three future major leaguers: MacFayden, Josh Billings and Shanty Hogan. On May 7, 1924, pitching for Somerville against Everett High, MacFayden struck out between 31 and 33 batters in 17 innings while giving up only four hits. He lost the game 2–1.

After graduating from Somerville High in 1924, he attended Hebron Academy (Hebron, Maine) to prepare himself for attending college. His mother wanted him to go to Dartmouth College. (He would return to Hebron in the 1931–32 offseason to serve as the school's hockey coach.)

He played in the semi-pro Boston Twilight League in the summers of 1923 and 1924. In 1924 he played for the Osterville town team in the Cape Cod Baseball League (CCBL) and posted a 9–2 record. Playing alongside his Somerville High teammate and fellow future-major leaguer Shanty Hogan, the pair led Osterville to the league title. In 1925, MacFayden returned to the CCBL with Falmouth. He was inducted into the CCBL Hall of Fame in 2012.

== Boston Red Sox ==
MacFayden was signed by Boston Red Sox owner Bob Quinn after he saw him pitching in the Twilight League. He decided to give up going to Dartmouth as a pro baseball career offered him financial security, which would enable him to help his mother.

He did not play in the minor leagues but went straight to the Red Sox, making his debut on August 25, 1926, against the Detroit Tigers as a reliever. He was the first pitcher in the American League to wear eyeglasses, which corrected for near-sightedness.

After one more relief stint, MacFayden made his first start against the legendary Walter Johnson of the Washington Senators on September 4, 1926. He lost 5–1, throwing a complete game. In 1928, he was the Boston Red Sox's Opening Day pitcher, making his season debut in Griffith Stadium in Washington, D.C., with another native New Englander, President Calvin Coolidge in attendance. He won 7–5.

In his five years with the Red Sox, he was a relatively mediocre pitcher with an abysmal team, though he did lead the league with four shutouts in 1928, a year he went 10–18 with a 3.62 ERA. In 1932, after going 1–10 to start the season, he was traded to the New York Yankees for pitchers Ivy Andrews and Hank Johnson and $50,000 in cash. Both pitchers were on the disabled list at the time, but the trade seemed lopsided in favor of the Red Sox. The speculation was that Yankees owner Jacob Ruppert was trying to keep MacFayden away from contending teams.

Ruppert might have been thinking of MacFayden's stellar performance against the Yankees on May 24, 1929, the year he led the league in shutouts. In a game he started at Fenway Park, MacFayden shutout the famed "Murderer's Row", throwing a four-hitter. He did load the bases with no outs one inning, but then retired the heart of the order, Lou Gehrig, Babe Ruth, and Tony Lazzeri, striking out both Gehrig and Lazzeri.

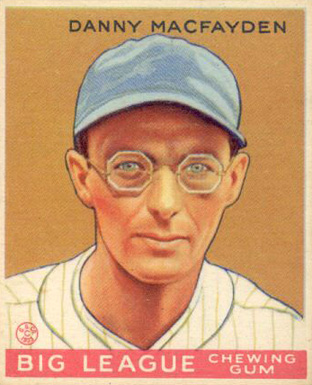
MacFayden's 1933 Goudey baseball card

== New York Yankees ==
In his 17 games for The Bronx Bombers in the 1932 season, 15 were starts, and he went 7–5 with a 3.93 ERA. The Yankees, anchored by Hall of Famers Babe Ruth, Lou Gehrig, Tony Lazzeri and Bill Dickey among position players and Hall of Fame starting pitchers Lefty Gomez, Herb Pennock and Red Ruffing on the mound went on to win 107 games and sweep the Chicago Cubs in the World Series. The Yankees' post-season roster carried only six pitchers, however, and MacFayden wasn't one of them.

He would never again be on a pennant winner. After the Yankees lost the pennant to the Senators in 1933, Dan Daniel of the World-Telegram blamed MacFayden, who had a dreadful 5.88 ERA as a spot starter and reliever, for the Bronx Bomber's failure to repeat as American League champions.

In '34, the Yankees again used him as a spot starter and reliever. After the 1934 season, he was purchased conditionally by the Cincinnati Reds for $5,000 and an additional $7,500 if they chose to keep him after June 1, 1935. MacFayden told the press he was happy to be leaving the Bronx, as he did not like the way manager Joe McCarthy (another future Hall of Famer) handled him. MacFayden pitched both overhand and sidearm, claiming that his sidearm delivery was more effective, but McCarthy dictated that his pitchers use an overhand motion.

The Reds returned him to the Yankees in June 1935, and they put him on waivers. MacFayden was picked up off the waiver wire by the Boston Braves, which paid the Yankees $4,000 for his contract. MacFayden was returning to his hometown to play for yet another abysmal team.

== Back to Boston ==
He would play five season with Boston's National League team through the end of the 1939 season. The team, which was partly owned by Bob Quinn, the former Red Sox owner who first signed MacFayden, started calling itself the Boston Bees in 1936 in a bid to get the fans to forget their dismal performance.

Ironically, his first three full seasons with the Boston Bees would be the best of his career. A harbinger of what was to come occurred on September 28, 1935, when MacFayden tied Dazzy Vance's 11-year-old National League record for strikeouts in a nine-inning game when he fanned 15 New York Giants hitters in a game. (Hall of Famer Vance also struck-out 17 batters in a 10-inning game in 1925.)

MacFayden had his best year in 1936. His ERA of 2.87 ranked second best in the senior circuit, which along with his 17–13 record on a team that came in 6th in an eight-team league with 71 victories, won him votes for Most Valuable Player. (He came in 9th in a vote topped by Hall of Famer pitchers Carl Hubbell of the pennant-winning New York Giants, the N.L. M.V.P., and runner-up Dizzy Dean of the St. Louis Cardinals, that year's bridesmaid for the N.L. pennant.) His 1937 and '38 ERAs of 2.93 and 2.95 put him in the Top 10 for the league.

According to Charles Bukowski's childhood friend Harold Mortenson, in the 1930s, the two played a statistics-intensive baseball game akin to Strat-O-Matic that involved two dice and two manuals that was marketed under Danny MacFayden's name when he was with the Boston Bees.

After a losing season in 1939, the Bees traded him to the Pittsburgh Pirates for pitcher Bill Swift and cash. For the Pirates, he was 5–4 with a 3.55 ERA, mostly as a reliever, but the organization released after the 1940 season as they considered him too old at 35. The Senators signed him as free agent, but released him on May 15, 1941, after he went 0–1 with a 10.59 ERA in five games.

MacFayden eventually returned to Boston's Braves Field in July 1943 for a last hurrah, two years after being released by the Senators. The manpower demands of World War II meant that major league baseball was bereft of major league talent. He went 2–1 with a 5.91 ERA, all but one of his ten games in relief. He was released by the Braves in April 1944, before the start of the season.

== Post-baseball career ==
MacFayden continued to work as the Hebron Academy as hockey coach into the early 1940s. He also had worked in insurance in some off-seasons. He was appointed Maine's commissioner of amateur baseball in the summer of 1942, the first year he was out of pro baseball since being signed by the Red Sox. He became a teacher at Vermont Academy in October 1943. MacFayden became the varsity baseball coach at Bowdoin College in Brunswick, Maine, in 1946 and remained at that post for 23 years through 1968. He also coached hockey at Bowdoin from 1946 to 1957, retiring as a coach in 1970.

On August 26, 1972, after a long illness, he died at Brunswick Hospital. He was 67 years old.

== Highlights ==
- Led American League in shutouts (1929, four)
- Finished ninth in National League MVP vote (1936)
- On September 28, 1935, struck out 15 New York Giants hitters in a nine-inning game, equaling Dazzy Vance's 1924 National League record.
