= Milt Gaston =

American baseball player (1896–1996)

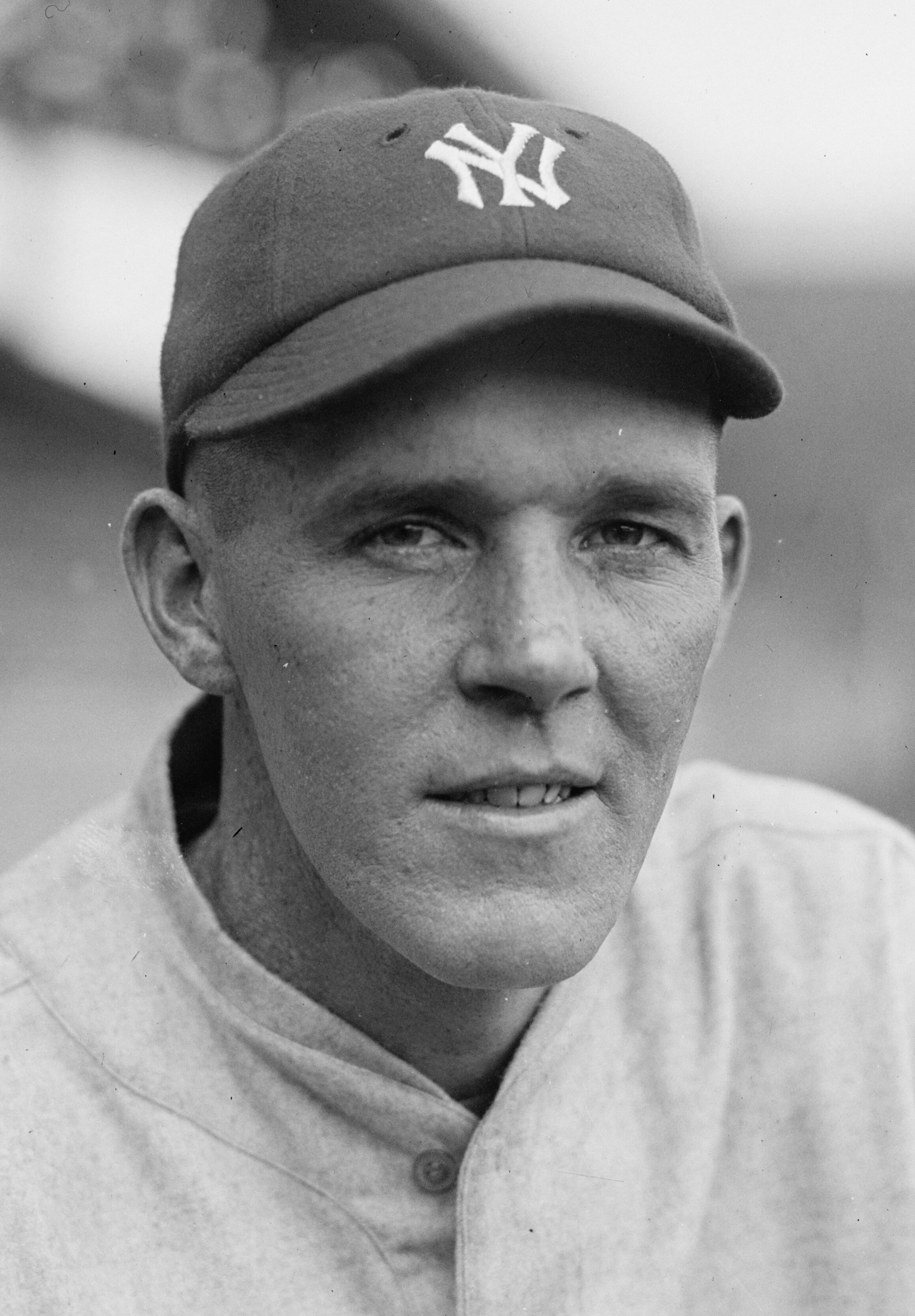
- Gaston in 1924
- Pitcher
- Born: January 27, 1896; Ridgefield Park, New Jersey, U.S.
- Died: April 26, 1996 (aged 100); Barnstable, Massachusetts, U.S.
- Batted: Right Threw: Right

MLB debut
- April 20, 1924, for the New York Yankees

Last MLB appearance
- September 26, 1934, for the Chicago White Sox

MLB statistics
- Win–loss record: 97–164
- Earned run average: 4.55
- Strikeouts: 615
- Stats at Baseball Reference

Teams
- New York Yankees (1924); St. Louis Browns (1925–1927); Washington Senators (1928); Boston Red Sox (1929–1931); Chicago White Sox (1932–1934)

Nathaniel Milton Gaston (January 27, 1896 – April 26, 1996) was an American right-handed pitcher in Major League Baseball from 1924 to 1934. Born in Ridgefield Park, New Jersey, he played for the New York Yankees, St. Louis Browns, Washington Senators, Boston Red Sox and Chicago White Sox. His older brother, Alex, was his batterymate with the 1929 Red Sox. Danny MacFayden was his brother-in-law.

His first roommate in the majors was Lou Gehrig when he played for the New York Yankees.

Three of Babe Ruth's record-setting home runs during the 1927 New York Yankees season were hit off Gaston, on July 26, July 27 and Sept. 11.

Gaston's career record was 97–164. He is the major league record holder for most games under .500 in a career.

A good hitting pitcher in his 11-year major league career, he posted a .200 batting average (145-for-724) with 55 runs, 6 home runs and 75 RBIs.

== Death ==
Gaston died at the age of 100 in Barnstable, Massachusetts. He was the first centenarian player for the MLB to have played for at least 10 years.
