= Hod Lisenbee =

American baseball player (1898–1987)

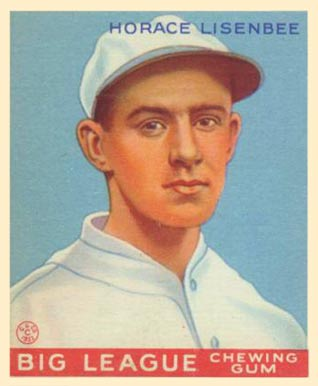
- Pitcher
- Born: September 23, 1898; Clarksville, Tennessee, U.S.
- Died: November 14, 1987 (aged 89); Clarksville, Tennessee, U.S.
- Batted: Right Threw: Right

MLB debut
- April 23, 1927, for the Washington Senators

Last MLB appearance
- September 7, 1945, for the Cincinnati Reds

MLB statistics
- Win–loss record: 37–58
- Earned run average: 4.81
- Strikeouts: 253
- Stats at Baseball Reference

Teams
- Washington Senators (1927–1928); Boston Red Sox (1929–1932); Philadelphia Athletics (1936); Cincinnati Reds (1945)

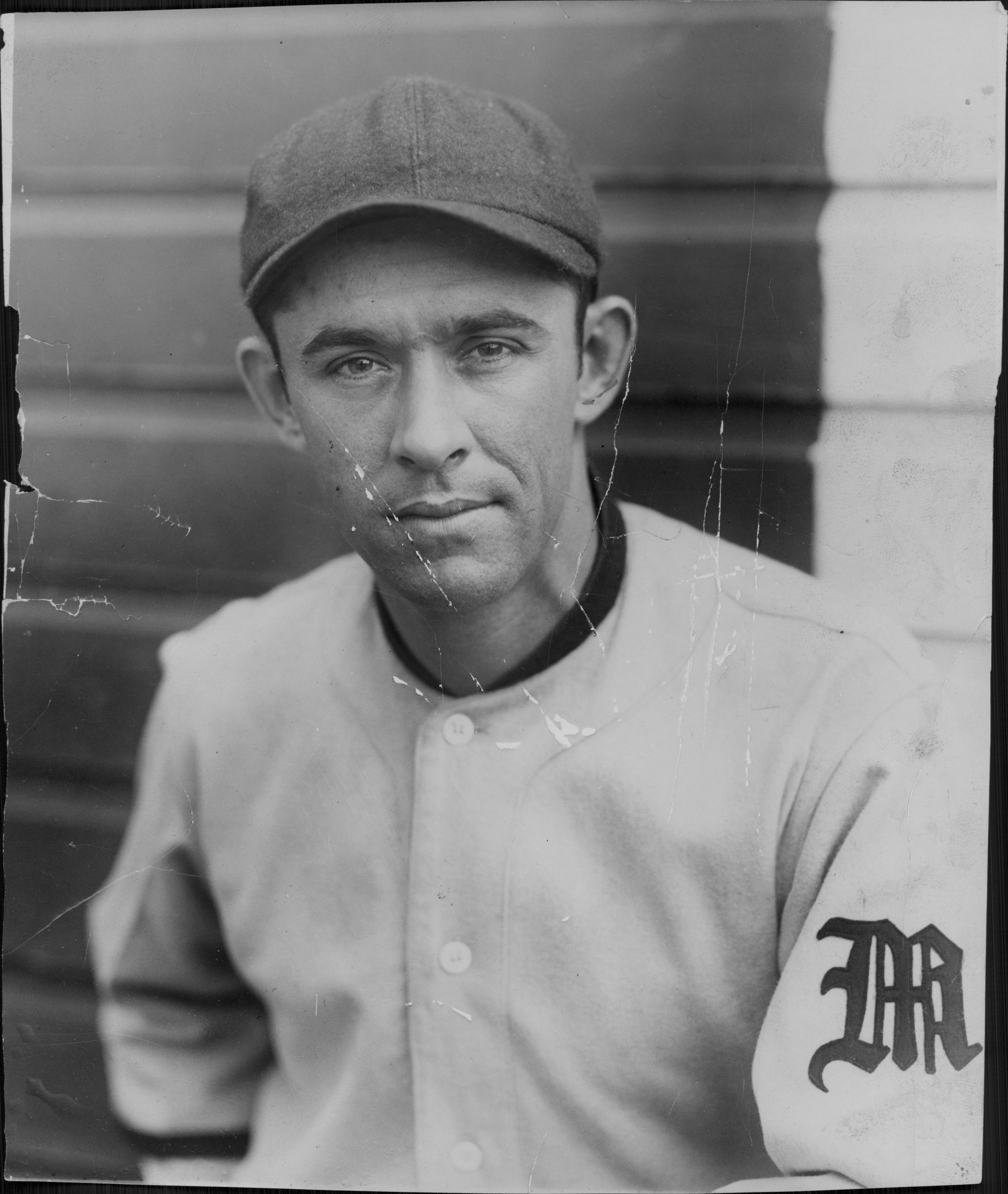
Horace Lisenbee (Minneapolis Millers)

Horace Milton "Hod" Lisenbee (September 23, 1898 – November 14, 1987) was an American professional baseball pitcher. He played in Major League Baseball (MLB) for the Washington Senators, Boston Red Sox, Philadelphia Athletics, and Cincinnati Reds. He was the last player born in the 1800s to appear in a major league game.

== Early years ==
Lisenbee was born on September 23, 1898, in Clarksville, Tennessee, to John M. Lisenbee and Sarah Adiline Lisenbee, both of Clarksville, the second of six children. He attended Southwestern Presbyterian University, now Austin Peay State University in Clarksville, Tennessee, and he was married to Carrie West, a nurse graduate student. Together they had two daughters.

Lisenbee did not play baseball until he entered high school at age twenty-one. He had attended elementary school until he was twelve, and dropped out of school to help his family survive financially. He labored for the next nine years working twelve-hour days on a tobacco farm. He would run to and from work and credits this time in his life as building endurance, a quality that helped him get through his lengthy baseball career.

In his spare time, Lisenbee loved to fling rocks into the Cumberland River. At age 21, Lisenbee entered Clarksville High School, and talked his way onto the baseball team. He told the coach that he was ready to pitch, but was soon cut from the team due to his poor fielding. Soon Lisenbee moved to Memphis in an effort to advance his career. He arrived at the Memphis Chicks playing field seeking to pitch, but his services were not needed.

Not to be put off, he moved to Vicksburg, Mississippi and applied to pitch for their D league team, though their manager declined. He phoned his contact on the Memphis Chicks team and was tipped to try out for the Brookhaven baseball team. Within two days, Lisenbee pitched a four-hit game against the Vicksburg team, including nine strikeouts, and notched a 4–1 win. In his first minor league season, he earned a 10–5 record.

== Transition to Major League Ball ==
Lisenbee joined the Tupelo Wolves, Tupelo, Mississippi, minor league team of the Tri-State League in 1925, and was traded to the Memphis Chicks, minor league team of the Southern Association in 1926. At the age of twenty-eight, he was acquired by the Washington, D. C. Senators for $44,000, and got his first pitching start on April 23, 1927. He led the Washington Senators to a 6–0 victory over the Boston Red Sox.

One of Lisenbee's notable accomplishments as a rookie was his consistency against the team dubbed "Murderers' Row". He faced the New York Yankees six times that year and won the first five outings against this storied team. The 1927 Yankees were the object of much praise, as they established a record setting 110–44 season. The Yankee hitting was vicious and frequently devoured pitchers in one inning, but Lisenbee appeared unflappable. Lisenbee was 5–1 versus New York that season.

In his first meeting with the Yankees, Lisenbee was called to the pitcher's mound to face Babe Ruth. The Senators' starting pitcher had fallen behind 3–0 in the count and the manager told Lisenbee to walk Ruth. Lisenbee disagreed and threw three strikes in a row to retire Ruth. Hod pitched the remaining seven and two-thirds innings for the win over the Yankees and he struck Ruth out three times in a row. According to Hod's recollection, Ruth later quipped that it looked as though he was throwing balls at the plate from out of a hole. This was an apparent response to Lisenbee's scrawny appearance, or possibly his underhand or sidearm pitching delivery.

Babe Ruth set the major league home run record with 60 home runs in 1927. During their sixth meeting, Lisenbee tried to sail his side-arm curveball past Ruth to no avail. For Ruth, this was a golden opportunity to connect with the ball, and the result was his 58th home run of the year. Lisenbee's first year record was 18–9 for the third place Senators, and he led the American League with four shutouts.

The following season went less favorably for Lisenbee, and in December 1928, he was traded to the Boston Red Sox. From this point in his career, Lisenbee became a journeyman pitcher in both the majors and minors. One game in particular stands out as a low-point in his career. On September 11, 1936, the Philadelphia Athletics manager, Connie Mack, tried to minimize the number of pitchers to take on a road trip, in order to save money. Lisenbee, who was 37 at the time, was forced to pitch the full nine innings. He ran into trouble and allowed a record-tying 26 hits as the Athletics lost to the Chicago White Sox 17–2. Lisenbee equalled the record of Allan Travers, who also gave up 26 hits for the Detroit Tigers against the Philadelphia Athletics on May 18, 1912. Despite the number of White Sox batters coming to the plate, the game was finished in 1 hour and 57 minutes.

From 1932 to 1942, Lisenbee pitched in only 19 major league games, but played for ten minor league clubs.

In 1942, Lisenbee retired from baseball to run the family farm and to help grow crops for the Army. But he decided to make a comeback in 1944, with the Syracuse Chiefs of the International League, a minor league team and in the latter part of the season, pitched a no-hitter at the age of forty-five. This game was considered a perfect record-setting event. Lisenbee had completed a no-hit, no-walk, and no-run game. According to Lisenbee, in an article published by The Leaf-Chronicle newspaper in 1945, he was hailed as man of the year in Syracuse sports and when he left town, the local fans gave him $200 in war bonds.

The following year, he received a $3,000 sign-on bonus from the Cincinnati Reds and pitched 31 games for the Reds, as a reliever. Lisenbee played his last game in major league baseball at the age of 47 on September 7, 1945, and was released by the Cincinnati Reds on September 11, 1945. He had the distinction of being the last player born in the 1800s to appear in a major league game. Following his release from the Reds, he returned to his hometown of Clarksville and continued to pitch for the Clarksville Colts of the Kitty Hawk League until he was fifty-one-years-old. He then sold the Clarksville Colts and retired from baseball.

== Later years ==
Hod Lisenbee was manager and half-owner of the Clarksville Colts club from 1946 to 1948. During the 1948 season, he bought the remaining half of the team, but the Colts continued to have problems both in attracting paying customers with their playing abilities on the ball field. He lost money on the Colts and sold the team.

Lisenbee lived in his hometown of Clarksville from the fall of 1945 until his death in 1987. His final years were spent farming on his 800-acre (3.2 km^{2}) farm near Clarksville. He was elected to the Tennessee Sports Hall of Fame in 1971. He died at age 89 on November 14, 1987 in Clarksville and is buried at the Liberty Presbyterian Church Cemetery.

In 1998, the Clarksville City Council renamed a portion of Dover Road (Highway 79) near the Dover Crossing interception as Hod Lisenbee Memorial Highway. The sign sits near the 800-acre (3.2 km^{2}) plot of land that Lisenbee farmed for his last years of life. Lisenbee raised cattle and sold them for breeding purposes.

== Outside sources ==
- The Leaf-Chronicle, article February 28, 1945, page 6, Story outlining Lisenbee's career highlights and offer to return to MLB, includes information about his year with the Syracuse International League, and his no-hitter game pitched in 1944.
- The Leaf-Chronicle, article December 4, 1966, page 1B, Interview with Lisenbee, covers early years in the minor league in Tennessee and Mississippi and first year with the Washington Senators.
- The Leaf-Chronicle, front page, lead story and obituary of Lisenbee's career in baseball and farming.
- Ramblings of a Tennessee Boy, by Charles Bryant, biography of Hod Lisenbee
