= 1927 Boston Red Sox season =

Major League Baseball season

1927 Boston Red Sox
- League: American League
- Ballpark: Fenway Park
- City: Boston, Massachusetts
- Record: 51–103 (.331)
- League place: 8th
- Owners: J. A. Robert Quinn
- Managers: Bill Carrigan
- Radio: WNAC (Fred Hoey, Gerry Harrison)
- Stats: ESPN.com; Baseball Reference

The 1927 Boston Red Sox season was the 27th season in the franchise's Major League Baseball history. The Red Sox finished last in the eight-team American League (AL) with a record of 51 wins and 103 losses, 59 games behind the New York Yankees, who went on to win the 1927 World Series.

== Regular season ==
=== Season standings ===
American League
| Team | W | L | Pct. | GB | Home | Road |
|---|---|---|---|---|---|---|
| New York Yankees | 110 | 44 | .714 | — | 57‍–‍19 | 53‍–‍25 |
| Philadelphia Athletics | 91 | 63 | .591 | 19 | 50‍–‍27 | 41‍–‍36 |
| Washington Senators | 85 | 69 | .552 | 25 | 51‍–‍28 | 34‍–‍41 |
| Detroit Tigers | 82 | 71 | .536 | 27½ | 44‍–‍32 | 38‍–‍39 |
| Chicago White Sox | 70 | 83 | .458 | 39½ | 38‍–‍37 | 32‍–‍46 |
| Cleveland Indians | 66 | 87 | .431 | 43½ | 35‍–‍42 | 31‍–‍45 |
| St. Louis Browns | 59 | 94 | .386 | 50½ | 38‍–‍38 | 21‍–‍56 |
| Boston Red Sox | 51 | 103 | .331 | 59 | 29‍–‍49 | 22‍–‍54 |

=== Record vs. opponents ===
1927 American League record Sources:
| Team | BOS | CWS | CLE | DET | NYY | PHA | SLB | WSH |
|---|---|---|---|---|---|---|---|---|
| Boston | — | 11–11 | 15–7 | 5–17 | 4–18 | 6–16 | 6–16 | 4–18 |
| Chicago | 11–11 | — | 8–14 | 13–8 | 5–17 | 8–14 | 15–7 | 10–12 |
| Cleveland | 7–15 | 14–8 | — | 7–15 | 10–12 | 10–12 | 10–11 | 8–14 |
| Detroit | 17–5 | 8–13 | 15–7 | — | 8–14 | 9–13 | 14–8–1 | 11–11–2 |
| New York | 18–4 | 17–5 | 12–10 | 14–8 | — | 14–8–1 | 21–1 | 14–8 |
| Philadelphia | 16–6 | 14–8 | 12–10 | 13–9 | 8–14–1 | — | 16–6 | 12–10 |
| St. Louis | 16–6 | 7–15 | 11–10 | 8–14–1 | 1–21 | 6–16 | — | 10–12–1 |
| Washington | 18–4 | 12–10 | 14–8 | 11–11–2 | 8–14 | 10–12 | 12–10–1 | — |

=== Opening Day lineup ===
| Pee-Wee Wanninger | SS |
| Fred Haney | 3B |
| Jack Tobin | RF |
| Ira Flagstead | CF |
| Phil Todt | 1B |
| Wally Shaner | LF |
| Bill Regan | 2B |
| Fred Hofmann | C |
| Slim Harriss | P |

=== Roster ===
1927 Boston Red Sox
Roster
| Pitchers: Frank Bennett; Herb Bradley; Frank Bushey; Bob Cremins; Slim Harriss; Del Lundgren; Danny MacFayden; Red Ruffing; Jack Russell; Rudy Sommers; Tony Welzer; John Wilson; Hal Wiltse; Ted Wingfield | Catchers: Grover Hartley; Fred Hofmann; Bill Moore; Infielders: Elmer Eggert; Fred Haney; Marty Karow; Buddy Myer; Bill Regan; Topper Rigney; Billy Rogell; Red Rollings; Jack Rothrock; Phil Todt; Pee-Wee Wanninger | Outfielders: Cleo Carlyle; Ira Flagstead; John Freeman; Baby Doll Jacobson; Wally Shaner; Arlie Tarbert; Jack Tobin; Frank Welch; Other batters: Fred Bratschi | Manager: Bill Carrigan; Coaches: Jack Ryan (Pitching); Heinie Wagner |

== Player stats ==
=== Batting ===
==== Starters by position ====
Note: Pos = Position; G = Games played; AB = At bats; H = Hits; Avg. = Batting average; HR = Home runs; RBI = Runs batted in

| Pos | Player | G | AB | H | Avg. | HR | RBI |
|---|---|---|---|---|---|---|---|
| C | Grover Hartley | 103 | 244 | 67 | .275 | 1 | 31 |
| 1B | Phil Todt | 140 | 516 | 122 | .236 | 6 | 52 |
| 2B | Bill Regan | 129 | 468 | 128 | .274 | 2 | 66 |
| SS | Buddy Myer | 133 | 469 | 135 | .288 | 2 | 47 |
| 3B | Billy Rogell | 82 | 207 | 55 | .266 | 2 | 28 |
| OF | Jack Tobin | 111 | 374 | 116 | .310 | 2 | 40 |
| OF | Wally Shaner | 122 | 406 | 111 | .273 | 3 | 49 |
| OF | Ira Flagstead | 131 | 466 | 133 | .285 | 4 | 69 |

==== Other batters ====
Note: G = Games played; AB = At bats; H = Hits; Avg. = Batting average; HR = Home runs; RBI = Runs batted in

| Player | G | AB | H | Avg. | HR | RBI |
|---|---|---|---|---|---|---|
| Jack Rothrock | 117 | 428 | 111 | .259 | 1 | 36 |
| Cleo Carlyle | 95 | 278 | 65 | .234 | 1 | 28 |
| Fred Hofmann | 87 | 217 | 59 | .272 | 0 | 24 |
| Red Rollings | 82 | 184 | 49 | .266 | 0 | 9 |
| Baby Doll Jacobson | 45 | 155 | 38 | .245 | 0 | 24 |
| Fred Haney | 47 | 116 | 32 | .276 | 3 | 12 |
| Bill Moore | 44 | 69 | 15 | .217 | 0 | 4 |
| Arlie Tarbert | 33 | 69 | 13 | .188 | 0 | 5 |
| Pee-Wee Wanninger | 18 | 60 | 12 | .200 | 0 | 1 |
| Frank Welch | 15 | 28 | 5 | .179 | 0 | 4 |
| Topper Rigney | 8 | 18 | 2 | .111 | 0 | 0 |
| Marty Karow | 6 | 10 | 2 | .200 | 0 | 0 |
| Elmer Eggert | 5 | 3 | 0 | .000 | 0 | 0 |
| John Freeman | 4 | 2 | 0 | .000 | 0 | 0 |
| Fred Bratschi | 1 | 1 | 0 | .000 | 0 | 0 |

=== Pitching ===
==== Starting pitchers ====
Note: G = Games pitched; IP = Innings pitched; W = Wins; L = Losses; ERA = Earned run average; SO = Strikeouts

| Player | G | IP | W | L | ERA | SO |
|---|---|---|---|---|---|---|
| Hal Wiltse | 36 | 219.0 | 10 | 18 | 5.10 | 47 |
| Red Ruffing | 26 | 158.1 | 5 | 13 | 4.66 | 77 |

==== Other pitchers ====
Note: G = Games pitched; IP = Innings pitched; W = Wins; L = Losses; ERA = Earned run average; SO = Strikeouts

| Player | G | IP | W | L | ERA | SO |
|---|---|---|---|---|---|---|
| Slim Harriss | 44 | 217.2 | 14 | 21 | 4.18 | 77 |
| Tony Welzer | 37 | 171.2 | 6 | 11 | 4.72 | 56 |
| Danny MacFayden | 34 | 160.1 | 5 | 8 | 4.27 | 42 |
| Jack Russell | 34 | 147.0 | 4 | 9 | 4.10 | 25 |
| Del Lundgren | 30 | 136.1 | 5 | 12 | 6.27 | 39 |
| Ted Wingfield | 20 | 74.2 | 1 | 7 | 5.06 | 1 |
| John Wilson | 5 | 25.1 | 0 | 2 | 3.55 | 8 |
| Herb Bradley | 6 | 23.0 | 1 | 1 | 3.13 | 6 |
| Frank Bennett | 4 | 12.1 | 0 | 1 | 2.92 | 1 |

==== Relief pitchers ====
Note: G = Games pitched; W = Wins; L = Losses; SV = Saves; ERA = Earned run average; SO = Strikeouts

| Player | G | W | L | SV | ERA | SO |
|---|---|---|---|---|---|---|
| Rudy Sommers | 7 | 0 | 0 | 0 | 8.36 | 2 |
| Bob Cremins | 4 | 0 | 0 | 0 | 5.06 | 0 |
| Frank Bushey | 1 | 0 | 0 | 0 | 6.75 | 0 |
