= 1928 Boston Red Sox season =

Major League Baseball season

1928 Boston Red Sox
- League: American League
- Ballpark: Fenway Park
- City: Boston, Massachusetts
- Record: 57–96 (.373)
- League place: 8th
- Owners: J. A. Robert Quinn
- Managers: Bill Carrigan
- Radio: WNAC (Fred Hoey)
- Stats: ESPN.com; Baseball Reference

The 1928 Boston Red Sox season was the 28th season in the franchise's Major League Baseball history. The Red Sox finished last in the eight-team American League (AL) with a record of 57 wins and 96 losses, 43 1/2 games behind the New York Yankees, who went on to win the 1928 World Series.

== Regular season ==
=== Season standings ===
American League
Team	W	L	Pct.	GB	Home	Road
New York Yankees	101	53	.656	—	52‍–‍25	49‍–‍28
Philadelphia Athletics	98	55	.641	2½	52‍–‍25	46‍–‍30
St. Louis Browns	82	72	.532	19	43‍–‍34	39‍–‍38
Washington Senators	75	79	.487	26	37‍–‍43	38‍–‍36
Chicago White Sox	72	82	.468	29	37‍–‍40	35‍–‍42
Detroit Tigers	68	86	.442	33	36‍–‍41	32‍–‍45
Cleveland Indians	62	92	.403	39	28‍–‍49	34‍–‍43
Boston Red Sox	57	96	.373	43½	26‍–‍47	31‍–‍49

=== Record vs. opponents ===
1928 American League record Sources:
Team	BOS	CWS	CLE	DET	NYY	PHA	SLB	WSH
Boston	—	10–12	9–13	7–15	6–16	3–18	9–13	13–9–1
Chicago	12–10	—	12–10–1	13–9	9–13	6–16	10–12	10–12
Cleveland	13–9	10–12–1	—	10–12	6–16	6–16	7–15	10–12
Detroit	15–7	9–13	12–10	—	7–15	8–14	9–13	8–14
New York	16–6	13–9	16–6	15–7	—	16–6	12–10	13–9
Philadelphia	18–3	16–6	16–6	14–8	6–16	—	16–6	12–10
St. Louis	13–9	12–10	15–7	13–9	10–12	6–16	—	13–9
Washington	9–13–1	12–10	12–10	14–8	9–13	10–12	9–13	—

=== Opening Day lineup ===
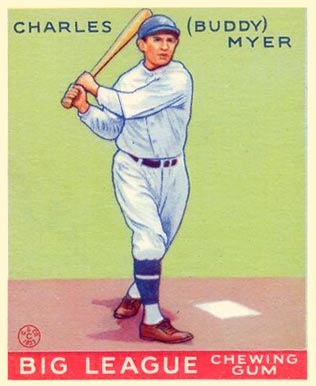
All Star Buddy Myer

Jack Rothrock	SS
Phil Todt	1B
Ira Flagstead	CF
Ken Williams	LF
Buddy Myer	3B
Bill Regan	2B
Doug Taitt	RF
Fred Hofmann	C
Danny MacFayden	P

=== Notable transactions ===
- April 25, 1928: Hal Wiltse was traded by the Red Sox to the St. Louis Browns for Wally Gerber.

=== Roster ===
1928 Boston Red Sox
Roster
Pitchers: Frank Bennett; Herb Bradley; Cliff Garrison; Marty Griffin; Slim Harriss; Danny MacFayden; Ed Morris; Red Ruffing; Jack Russell; Merle Settlemire; John Shea; Pat Simmons; Steve Slayton; John Wilson; Hal Wiltse	Catchers: Bob Asbjornson; Charlie Berry; Johnnie Heving; Fred Hofmann; Infielders: Wally Gerber; Freddie Moncewicz; Buddy Myer; Bill Regan; Billy Rogell; Red Rollings; Phil Todt	Outfielders: Ira Flagstead; George Loepp; Jack Rothrock; Carl Sumner; Doug Taitt; Arlie Tarbert; Denny Williams; Ken Williams; Other batters: Paul Hinson	Manager: Bill Carrigan; Coaches: Bob Coleman; Heinie Wagner

== Player stats ==
=== Batting ===
==== Starters by position ====
Note: Pos = Position; G = Games played; AB = At bats; H = Hits; Avg. = Batting average; HR = Home runs; RBI = Runs batted in

Pos	Player	G	AB	H	Avg.	HR	RBI
C	Fred Hofmann	78	199	45	.226	0	16
1B	Phil Todt	144	539	136	.252	12	73
2B	Bill Regan	138	511	135	.264	7	75
SS	Wally Gerber	104	300	64	.213	0	28
3B	Buddy Myer	147	536	168	.313	1	44
OF	Ken Williams	133	462	140	.303	8	67
OF	Doug Taitt	143	482	144	.299	3	61
OF	Ira Flagstead	140	510	148	.290	1	39

==== Other batters ====
Note: G = Games played; AB = At bats; H = Hits; Avg. = Batting average; HR = Home runs; RBI = Runs batted in

Player	G	AB	H	Avg.	HR	RBI
Jack Rothrock	117	344	92	.267	3	22
Billy Rogell	102	296	69	.233	0	29
Charlie Berry	80	177	46	.260	1	19
Johnnie Heving	82	158	41	.259	0	11
George Loepp	15	51	9	.176	0	3
Red Rollings	50	48	11	.229	0	9
Carl Sumner	16	29	8	.276	0	3
Denny Williams	16	18	4	.222	0	1
Arlie Tarbert	6	17	3	.176	0	2
Bob Asbjornson	6	16	3	.188	0	1
Freddie Moncewicz	3	1	0	.000	0	0
Paul Hinson	3	0	0	----	0	0

=== Pitching ===
==== Starting pitchers ====
Note: G = Games pitched; IP = Innings pitched; W = Wins; L = Losses; ERA = Earned run average; SO = Strikeouts

Player	G	IP	W	L	ERA	SO
Red Ruffing	42	289.1	10	25	3.89	118
Ed Morris	47	257.2	19	15	3.53	104
Jack Russell	32	201.1	11	14	3.84	27
Danny MacFayden	33	195.0	9	15	4.75	61
Hal Wiltse	2	12.0	0	2	9.00	5

==== Other pitchers ====
Note: G = Games pitched; IP = Innings pitched; W = Wins; L = Losses; ERA = Earned run average; SO = Strikeouts

Player	G	IP	W	L	ERA	SO
Slim Harriss	27	128.1	8	11	4.63	37
Merle Settlemire	30	82.1	0	6	5.47	12
Herb Bradley	15	47.1	0	3	7.23	14
Marty Griffin	11	37.2	0	3	5.02	9

==== Relief pitchers ====
Note: G = Games pitched; W = Wins; L = Losses; SV = Saves; ERA = Earned run average; SO = Strikeouts

Player	G	W	L	SV	ERA	SO
Pat Simmons	31	0	2	1	4.04	16
Cliff Garrison	6	0	0	0	7.88	0
Steve Slayton	3	0	0	0	3.86	2
John Wilson	2	0	0	0	9.00	1
Jack Rothrock	1	0	0	0	0.00	0
Frank Bennett	1	0	0	0	0.00	0
John Shea	1	0	0	0	18.00	0
Doug Taitt	1	0	0	0	27.00	1

== Farm system ==
Level	Team	League	Manager
B	Salem Witches	New England League	Stuffy McInnis
