= Pittsfield Hillies =

Former minor league baseball team

- 1919–1930; Pittsfield, Massachusetts

Minor league affiliations
- Class: Class A
- League: Hudson River League (1905); Eastern League (1919-1930)

Minor league titles
- League titles (2): 1919; 1921

Team data
- Ballpark: Wahconah Park

The Pittsfield Hillies were an Eastern League (Class A) baseball team from 1919 to 1930. They were League Champions in 1919 and 1921.

Their home field was at Wahconah Park, Pittsfield, Massachusetts.

== 1905 ==
The Pittsfield Hillies was a professional minor league baseball team based in Pittsfield, Massachusetts which played in the Hudson River League. The Saugerties team from Saugerties, New York moved to Pittsfield on July 8, 1905 and resumed play as the Hillies. They finished with a 13-49 record and folded on July 25 of that year.

== Future Major League Hillies ==
- Cliff Brady (1919–20)
- Paddy Smith (1920)
- Charlie Hargreaves (1921–1922)
- Bob Barrett (1923)
- Joe Batchelder (1923, 1926)
- Si Rosenthal (1923)
- Ed Taylor (1923)
- Clay Van Alstyne (1923–1924)
- Earl Webb (1923–1924)
- Chick Autry (1924)
- Hal Goldsmith (1924)
- Mule Haas (1924)
- Ike Kamp (1924)
- Hunter Lane (1924)
- Mose Solomon, the "Rabbi of Swat" (1924)
- Art Mills (1924–1926)
- Joe Benes (1925)
- Bill Cronin (1926)
- Paul Richards (1926)
- Charlie Bates (1927)
- Joe Cascarella (1927–1928)
- Augie Walsh (1927)
- Jack Burns (1928)
- Ed Connolly (1928–1929)
- George Loepp (1928)
- John Shea (1928–1929)
- Joe Cicero (1929)
- Ed Durham (1929)
- Frank Mulroney (1929)
- Owen Kahn (1930)

== Hillies with previous Major League experience ==
- Joe Birmingham (1919–1920)
- Mickey Devine (1919)
- Gary Fortune (1919)
- Jack Hammond (1919–1921)
- Bobby Messenger (1919–1920)
- Ty Pickup (1919–1920)
- Johnny Tillman (1919–1923)
- Lew Wendell (1919)
- Frank Kelliher (1920)
- Colonel Snover (1920–1925)
- Bill McCorry (1921–1923)
- Al Pierotti (1921–1922)
- Ernie Neitzke (1922)
- Danny Silva (1922)
- Eddie Zimmerman (1922)
- Neal Ball (1923)
- Chick Gagnon (1923)
- Hal Leathers (1923)
- Bunny Roser (1923)
- Art Wilson (1923)
- Mike Wilson (1923)
- Jimmy Esmond (1924)
- Waddy Macphee (1924–1925)
- Horace Milan (1924, 1926)
- Mose Solomon (1924)
- Red Torphy (1924–1925)
- Shano Collins (1925, 1928)
- Lefty Jamerson (1925–1926)
- Tom Sullivan (1925)
- Augie Swentor (1925)
- Rowdy Elliott (1926)
- Ken Jones (1926)
- Sam Mayer (1926, 1929)
- John Perrin (1926)
- Red Sheridan (1926–1928)
- Ed Sperber (1926)
- Dan Woodman (1926)
- Ed Baecht (1927)
- Harry Baldwin (1927–1928)
- Ed Miller (1927)
- Frank Parkinson (1927–1928)
- Joe Smith (1927)
- Red Smith (1927)
- Denny Sothern (1927)
- Lefty Taber (1927)
- Mule Watson (1927)
- Frank Bennett (1928)
- Herb Bradley (1928–1929)
- Ralph Head (1928)
- Red Shea (1928)
- Charlie Small (1928–1930)
- Harry Wilke (1928–1930)
- Bob Asbjornson (1929)
- Frank Bushey (1928–1929)
- Freddie Moncewicz (1929)
- José Rodríguez (1929–1930)
- Pat Simmons (1929–1930)
- Carl Sumner (1929)
- Hod Lisenbee (1929)
- Maurice Archdeacon (1930)
- Jim Bishop (1930)
- Ray Dobens (1930)
- Bob Emmerich (1930)
