= 1927 Philadelphia Athletics season =

1927 Philadelphia Athletics
- League: American League
- Ballpark: Shibe Park
- City: Philadelphia
- Record: 91–63 (.591)
- League place: 2nd
- Owners: Connie Mack, Tom Shibe and John Shibe
- Managers: Connie Mack

The 1927 Philadelphia Athletics season involved the As finishing second in the American League with a record of 91 wins and 63 losses.

== Offseason ==
- December 23, 1926: Eddie Collins was signed as a free agent by the Athletics.
- February 8, 1927: Ty Cobb was signed as a free agent by the Athletics.

== Regular season ==
=== Season standings ===
American League
| Team | W | L | Pct. | GB | Home | Road |
|---|---|---|---|---|---|---|
| New York Yankees | 110 | 44 | .714 | — | 57‍–‍19 | 53‍–‍25 |
| Philadelphia Athletics | 91 | 63 | .591 | 19 | 50‍–‍27 | 41‍–‍36 |
| Washington Senators | 85 | 69 | .552 | 25 | 51‍–‍28 | 34‍–‍41 |
| Detroit Tigers | 82 | 71 | .536 | 27½ | 44‍–‍32 | 38‍–‍39 |
| Chicago White Sox | 70 | 83 | .458 | 39½ | 38‍–‍37 | 32‍–‍46 |
| Cleveland Indians | 66 | 87 | .431 | 43½ | 35‍–‍42 | 31‍–‍45 |
| St. Louis Browns | 59 | 94 | .386 | 50½ | 38‍–‍38 | 21‍–‍56 |
| Boston Red Sox | 51 | 103 | .331 | 59 | 29‍–‍49 | 22‍–‍54 |

=== Record vs. opponents ===
1927 American League record Sources:
| Team | BOS | CWS | CLE | DET | NYY | PHA | SLB | WSH |
|---|---|---|---|---|---|---|---|---|
| Boston | — | 11–11 | 15–7 | 5–17 | 4–18 | 6–16 | 6–16 | 4–18 |
| Chicago | 11–11 | — | 8–14 | 13–8 | 5–17 | 8–14 | 15–7 | 10–12 |
| Cleveland | 7–15 | 14–8 | — | 7–15 | 10–12 | 10–12 | 10–11 | 8–14 |
| Detroit | 17–5 | 8–13 | 15–7 | — | 8–14 | 9–13 | 14–8–1 | 11–11–2 |
| New York | 18–4 | 17–5 | 12–10 | 14–8 | — | 14–8–1 | 21–1 | 14–8 |
| Philadelphia | 16–6 | 14–8 | 12–10 | 13–9 | 8–14–1 | — | 16–6 | 12–10 |
| St. Louis | 16–6 | 7–15 | 11–10 | 8–14–1 | 1–21 | 6–16 | — | 10–12–1 |
| Washington | 18–4 | 12–10 | 14–8 | 11–11–2 | 8–14 | 10–12 | 12–10–1 | — |

=== Roster ===
1927 Philadelphia Athletics
Roster
| Pitchers: Neal Baker; Guy Cantrell; Howard Ehmke; Sam Gray; Lefty Grove; Jing Johnson; Joe Pate; Ike Powers; Jack Quinn; Eddie Rommel; Rube Walberg; Buzz Wetzel; Lefty Willis; Carroll Yerkes | Catchers: Mickey Cochrane; Cy Perkins; Infielders: Max Bishop; Joe Boley; Dud Branom; Eddie Collins; Jimmy Dykes; Jimmie Foxx; Chick Galloway; Sammy Hale; Joe Mellana; Jim Poole | Outfielders: Charlie Bates; Ty Cobb; Walter French; Baby Doll Jacobson; Bill Lamar; Rusty Saunders; Al Simmons; Zack Wheat | Manager: Connie Mack |

== Player stats ==
=== Batting ===
==== Starters by position ====
Note: Pos = Position; G = Games played; AB = At bats; H = Hits; Avg. = Batting average; HR = Home runs; RBI = Runs batted in

| Pos | Player | G | AB | H | Avg. | HR | RBI |
|---|---|---|---|---|---|---|---|
| C | Mickey Cochrane | 126 | 432 | 146 | .338 | 12 | 80 |
| 1B | Jimmy Dykes | 121 | 417 | 135 | .324 | 3 | 60 |
| 2B | Max Bishop | 117 | 372 | 103 | .277 | 0 | 22 |
| SS | Joe Boley | 118 | 370 | 115 | .311 | 1 | 52 |
| 3B | Sammy Hale | 131 | 501 | 157 | .313 | 5 | 81 |
| OF | Ty Cobb | 134 | 490 | 175 | .357 | 5 | 93 |
| OF | Al Simmons | 106 | 406 | 159 | .392 | 15 | 108 |
| OF | Walter French | 109 | 326 | 99 | .304 | 0 | 41 |

==== Other batters ====
Note: G = Games played; AB = At bats; H = Hits; Avg. = Batting average; HR = Home runs; RBI = Runs batted in

| Player | G | AB | H | Avg. | HR | RBI |
|---|---|---|---|---|---|---|
| Bill Lamar | 84 | 324 | 97 | .299 | 4 | 47 |
| Zach Wheat | 88 | 247 | 80 | .324 | 1 | 38 |
| Eddie Collins | 95 | 226 | 76 | .336 | 1 | 15 |
| Chick Galloway | 77 | 181 | 48 | .265 | 0 | 22 |
| Cy Perkins | 59 | 137 | 35 | .255 | 1 | 15 |
| Jimmie Foxx | 61 | 130 | 42 | .323 | 3 | 20 |
| Jim Poole | 38 | 99 | 22 | .222 | 0 | 10 |
| Dud Branom | 30 | 94 | 22 | .234 | 0 | 13 |
| Charlie Bates | 9 | 38 | 9 | .237 | 0 | 2 |
| Baby Doll Jacobson | 17 | 35 | 8 | .229 | 1 | 5 |
| Rusty Saunders | 5 | 15 | 2 | .133 | 0 | 2 |
| Joe Mellana | 4 | 7 | 2 | .286 | 0 | 2 |

=== Pitching ===
==== Starting pitchers ====
Note: G = Games pitched; IP = Innings pitched; W = Wins; L = Losses; ERA = Earned run average; SO = Strikeouts

| Player | G | IP | W | L | ERA | SO |
|---|---|---|---|---|---|---|
| Lefty Grove | 51 | 262.1 | 20 | 13 | 3.19 | 174 |
| Rube Walberg | 46 | 249.1 | 16 | 12 | 3.93 | 136 |
| Jack Quinn | 34 | 201.1 | 15 | 10 | 3.26 | 43 |
| Howard Ehmke | 30 | 189.2 | 12 | 10 | 4.22 | 68 |
| Guy Cantrell | 2 | 18.0 | 0 | 2 | 5.00 | 7 |

==== Other pitchers ====
Note: G = Games pitched; IP = Innings pitched; W = Wins; L = Losses; ERA = Earned run average; SO = Strikeouts

| Player | G | IP | W | L | ERA | SO |
|---|---|---|---|---|---|---|
| Eddie Rommel | 30 | 146.2 | 11 | 3 | 4.36 | 33 |
| Sam Gray | 37 | 133.1 | 9 | 6 | 4.59 | 49 |
| Neal Baker | 5 | 17.1 | 0 | 0 | 5.71 | 3 |
| Buzz Wetzel | 2 | 4.2 | 0 | 0 | 7.71 | 0 |

==== Relief pitchers ====
Note: G = Games pitched; W = Wins; L = Losses; SV = Saves; ERA = Earned run average; SO = Strikeouts

| Player | G | W | L | SV | ERA | SO |
|---|---|---|---|---|---|---|
| Joe Pate | 32 | 0 | 3 | 6 | 5.20 | 14 |
| Jing Johnson | 17 | 4 | 2 | 0 | 3.48 | 16 |
| Lefty Willis | 15 | 3 | 1 | 0 | 5.67 | 7 |
| Ike Powers | 11 | 1 | 1 | 0 | 4.50 | 3 |
| Jimmy Dykes | 2 | 0 | 0 | 1 | 4.50 | 0 |
| Carroll Yerkes | 1 | 0 | 0 | 0 | 0.00 | 0 |

== Awards and honors ==
=== League leaders ===
- Lefty Grove
  - American League leader, Strikeouts

== Farm system ==
| Level | Team | League | Manager |
|---|---|---|---|
| AA | Buffalo Bisons | International League | Bill Clymer |

LEAGUE CHAMPIONS: Buffalo
