= 1927 Chicago White Sox season =

1927 Chicago White Sox
- League: American League
- Ballpark: Comiskey Park
- City: Chicago
- Record: 70–83 (.458)
- League place: 5th
- Owners: Charles Comiskey
- Managers: Ray Schalk
- Radio: WGN (Quin Ryan); WMAQ (Hal Totten)

The 1927 Chicago White Sox season was a season in Major League Baseball. The team finished fifth in the American League with a record of 70–83, 39 games behind the pennant-winning New York Yankees.

== Offseason ==
- November 1926: Eddie Collins was released by the White Sox.
- January 15, 1927: Sloppy Thurston and Leo Mangum were traded by the White Sox to the Washington Senators for Roger Peckinpaugh.

== Regular season ==
=== Season standings ===
American League
Team	W	L	Pct.	GB	Home	Road
New York Yankees	110	44	.714	—	57‍–‍19	53‍–‍25
Philadelphia Athletics	91	63	.591	19	50‍–‍27	41‍–‍36
Washington Senators	85	69	.552	25	51‍–‍28	34‍–‍41
Detroit Tigers	82	71	.536	27½	44‍–‍32	38‍–‍39
Chicago White Sox	70	83	.458	39½	38‍–‍37	32‍–‍46
Cleveland Indians	66	87	.431	43½	35‍–‍42	31‍–‍45
St. Louis Browns	59	94	.386	50½	38‍–‍38	21‍–‍56
Boston Red Sox	51	103	.331	59	29‍–‍49	22‍–‍54

=== Record vs. opponents ===
1927 American League record Sources:
Team	BOS	CWS	CLE	DET	NYY	PHA	SLB	WSH
Boston	—	11–11	15–7	5–17	4–18	6–16	6–16	4–18
Chicago	11–11	—	8–14	13–8	5–17	8–14	15–7	10–12
Cleveland	7–15	14–8	—	7–15	10–12	10–12	10–11	8–14
Detroit	17–5	8–13	15–7	—	8–14	9–13	14–8–1	11–11–2
New York	18–4	17–5	12–10	14–8	—	14–8–1	21–1	14–8
Philadelphia	16–6	14–8	12–10	13–9	8–14–1	—	16–6	12–10
St. Louis	16–6	7–15	11–10	8–14–1	1–21	6–16	—	10–12–1
Washington	18–4	12–10	14–8	11–11–2	8–14	10–12	12–10–1	—

=== Notable transactions ===
- June 15, 1927: Bernie Neis was purchased by the White Sox from the Cleveland Indians.

=== Roster ===
1927 Chicago White Sox
Roster
Pitchers: Charlie Barnabe; Ted Blankenship; Joe Brown; Bert Cole; Sarge Connally; Red Faber; Elmer Jacobs; Ted Lyons; Frank Stewart; Tommy Thomas	Catchers: Buck Crouse; Harry McCurdy; Ray Schalk; Infielders: Jim Battle; Moe Berg; Bud Clancy; Roy Flaskamper; Bill Hunnefield; Willie Kamm; Roger Peckinpaugh; Earl Sheely; Aaron Ward; Bob Way	Outfielders: Bill Barrett; Ike Boone; Bibb Falk; Alex Metzler; Randy Moore; Johnny Mostil; Bernie Neis; Carl Reynolds; Kid Willson; Other batters: Lena Blackburne	Manager: Ray Schalk; Coaches: Lena Blackburne; Frank Roth

== Player stats ==
=== Batting ===
==== Starters by position ====
Note: Pos = Position; G = Games played; AB = At bats; H = Hits; Avg. = Batting average; HR = Home runs; RBI = Runs batted in

Pos	Player	G	AB	H	Avg.	HR	RBI
C	Harry McCurdy	86	262	75	.286	1	27
1B	Bud Clancy	130	464	139	.300	3	53
2B	Aaron Ward	145	463	125	.270	5	56
SS	Bill Hunnefield	112	365	104	.285	2	36
3B	Willie Kamm	148	540	146	.270	0	59
OF	Bill Barrett	147	556	159	.286	4	83
OF	Alex Metzler	134	543	173	.319	3	61
OF	Bibb Falk	145	535	175	.327	9	83

==== Other batters ====
Note: G = Games played; AB = At bats; H = Hits; Avg. = Batting average; HR = Home runs; RBI = Runs batted in

Player	G	AB	H	Avg.	HR	RBI
Buck Crouse	85	222	53	.239	0	20
Roger Peckinpaugh	68	217	64	.295	0	23
Earl Sheely	45	129	27	.209	2	16
Roy Flaskamper	26	95	21	.221	0	6
Bernie Neis	45	76	22	.289	0	11
Moe Berg	35	69	17	.246	0	4
Ike Boone	29	53	12	.226	1	11
Carl Reynolds	14	42	9	.214	1	7
Ray Schalk	16	26	6	.231	0	2
Johnny Mostil	13	16	2	.125	0	1
Randy Moore	6	15	0	.000	0	0
Kid Willson	7	10	1	.100	0	1
Jim Battle	6	8	3	.375	0	0
Bob Way	5	3	1	.333	0	1
Lena Blackburne	1	1	1	1.000	0	1

=== Pitching ===
==== Starting pitchers ====
Note: G = Games pitched; IP = Innings pitched; W = Wins; L = Losses; ERA = Earned run average; SO = Strikeouts

Player	G	IP	W	L	ERA	SO
Tommy Thomas	40	307.2	19	16	2.98	107
Ted Lyons	39	307.2	22	14	2.84	71
Ted Blankenship	37	236.2	12	17	5.06	51
Red Faber	18	110.2	4	7	4.55	39
Frank Stewart	1	4.0	0	1	9.00	0
Joe Brown	1	0.0	0	0	inf	0

==== Other pitchers ====
Note: G = Games pitched; IP = Innings pitched; W = Wins; L = Losses; ERA = Earned run average; SO = Strikeouts

Player	G	IP	W	L	ERA	SO
Sarge Connally	43	198.1	10	15	4.08	58
Elmer Jacobs	25	74.1	2	4	4.60	22
Charlie Barnabe	17	61.0	0	5	5.31	5

==== Relief pitchers ====
Note: G = Games pitched; W = Wins; L = Losses; SV = Saves; ERA = Earned run average; SO = Strikeouts

Player	G	W	L	SV	ERA	SO
Bert Cole	27	1	4	0	4.73	12
