= 1925 New York Yankees season =

Season for the Major League Baseball team the New York Yankees

1925 New York Yankees
- League: American League
- Ballpark: Yankee Stadium
- City: New York City, New York
- Record: 69–85 (.448)
- League place: 7th
- Owners: Jacob Ruppert
- General managers: Ed Barrow
- Managers: Miller Huggins

The 1925 New York Yankees season was the team's 23rd season. The team finished with a record of 69–85, in seventh place, 30 games behind the Washington Senators. New York was managed by Miller Huggins. The Yankees played at Yankee Stadium.

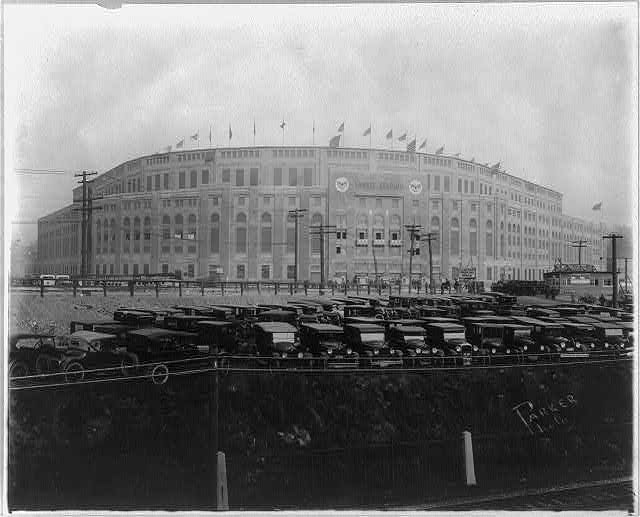
Yankee Stadium and a parking lot with cars during the 1925 season

This season was marred by Babe Ruth's mysterious illness that kept him out a good portion of the season. It was the club's lowest finish, in both percentage and place in the standings, since their seventh-place finish in 1913. It was also the first time they had finished below .500 since 1918. The Yankees would regroup and it would be 40 years before they would finish below .500 again.

== Regular season ==
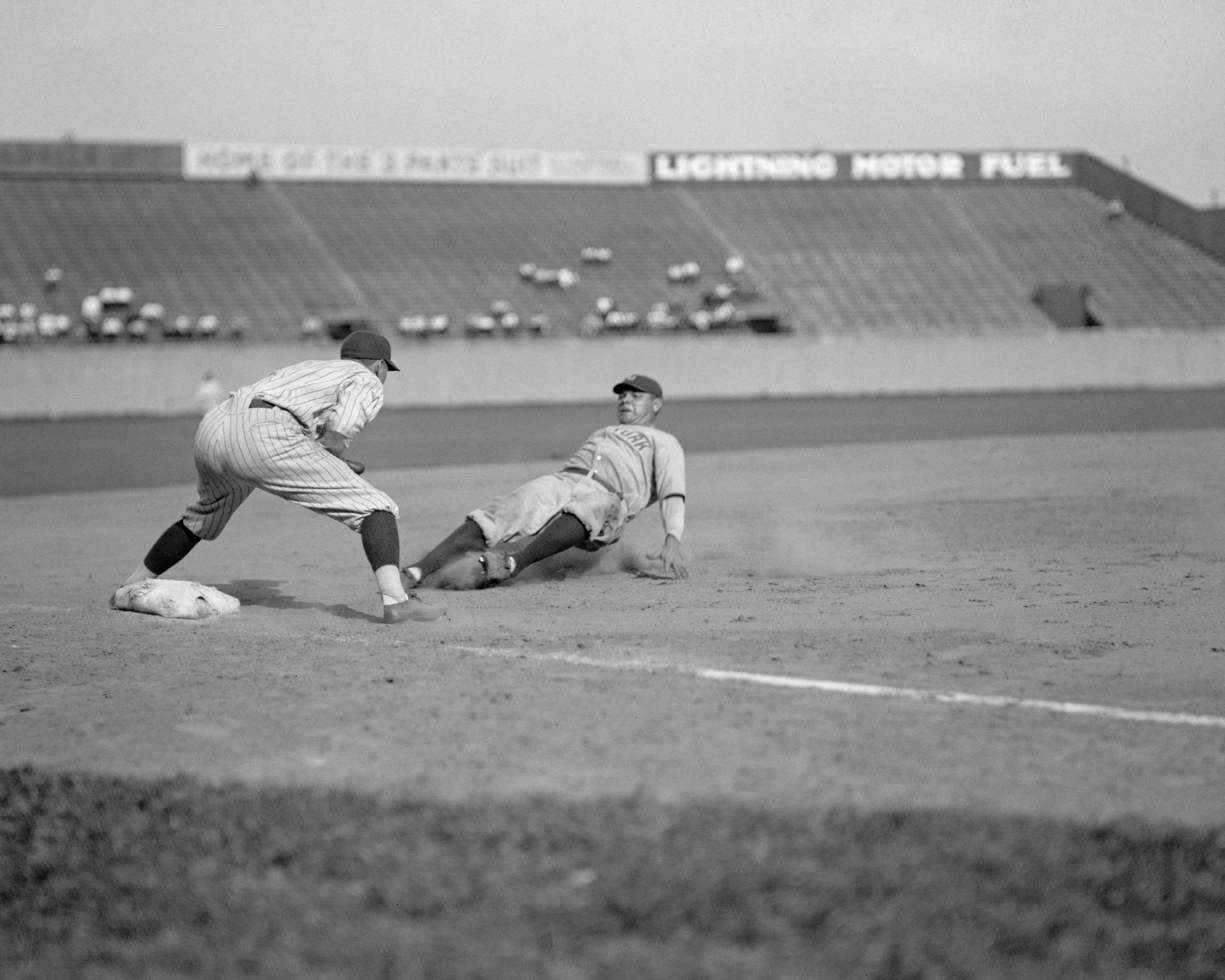
Babe Ruth sliding into third base at Griffith Stadium in Washington, D.C., on June 23, 1925. Washington Senators third baseman Ossie Bluege looks on.

=== Season standings ===
American League
Team	W	L	Pct.	GB	Home	Road
Washington Senators	96	55	.636	—	53‍–‍22	43‍–‍33
Philadelphia Athletics	88	64	.579	8½	51‍–‍26	37‍–‍38
St. Louis Browns	82	71	.536	15	45‍–‍32	37‍–‍39
Detroit Tigers	81	73	.526	16½	43‍–‍34	38‍–‍39
Chicago White Sox	79	75	.513	18½	44‍–‍33	35‍–‍42
Cleveland Indians	70	84	.455	27½	37‍–‍39	33‍–‍45
New York Yankees	69	85	.448	28½	42‍–‍36	27‍–‍49
Boston Red Sox	47	105	.309	49½	28‍–‍47	19‍–‍58

=== Record vs. opponents ===
1925 American League record Sources:
Team	BOS	CWS	CLE	DET	NYY	PHA	SLB	WSH
Boston	—	9–13	7–15	5–17	9–13	5–17	5–16	7–14
Chicago	13–9	—	14–8	13–9	13–9	8–14	9–13	9–13
Cleveland	15–7	8–14	—	11–11–1	10–12	11–11	11–11	4–18
Detroit	17–5	9–13	11–11–1	—	14–8–1	8–14	12–10	10–12
New York	13–9	9–13	12–10	8–14–1	—	9–13	11–11–1	7–15
Philadelphia	17–5	14–8	11–11	14–8	13–9	—	12–10	7–13–1
St. Louis	16–5	13–9	11–11	10–12	11–11–1	10–12	—	11–11
Washington	14–7	13–9	18–4	12–10	15–7	13–7–1	11–11	—

=== Notable transactions ===
- May 1925: Oscar Roettger and players to be named later were traded by the Yankees to the St. Paul Saints for Mark Koenig. The Yankees completed the deal by sending Fred Hofmann to the Saints on May 15 and Ernie Johnson to the Saints on October 28.

=== Roster ===
1925 New York Yankees
Roster
Pitchers: Walter Beall; Garland Braxton; Charlie Caldwell; Alex Ferguson; Ray Francis; Waite Hoyt; Hank Johnson; Sam Jones; Jim Marquis; Herb Pennock; Bob Shawkey; Ben Shields; Urban Shocker	Catchers: Benny Bengough; Fred Hofmann; Roy Luebbe; Steve O'Neill; Wally Schang; Infielders: Joe Dugan; Lou Gehrig; Ernie Johnson; Mark Koenig; Fred Merkle; Heinie Odom; Wally Pipp; Everett Scott; Howie Shanks; Pee-Wee Wanninger; Aaron Ward	Outfielders: Earle Combs; Bob Meusel; Ben Paschal; Babe Ruth; Bobby Veach; Whitey Witt; Other batters: Leo Durocher	Manager: Miller Huggins; Coaches: Fred Merkle; Charley O'Leary; George Wiltse

== Player stats ==
=== Batting ===
==== Starters by position ====
Note: Pos = Position; G = Games played; AB = At bats; H = Hits; Avg. = Batting average; HR = Home runs; RBI = Runs batted in

Pos	Player	G	AB	H	Avg.	HR	RBI
C	Benny Bengough	95	283	73	.258	0	23
1B	Lou Gehrig	126	437	129	.295	20	68
2B	Aaron Ward	125	439	108	.246	4	38
SS	Pee-Wee Wanninger	117	403	95	.236	1	23
3B	Joe Dugan	102	404	118	.292	0	33
OF	Bob Meusel	156	624	181	.290	33	134
OF	Babe Ruth	98	359	104	.290	25	67
OF	Earle Combs	150	593	203	.342	3	62

==== Other batters ====
Note: G = Games played; AB = At bats; H = Hits; Avg. = Batting average; HR = Home runs; RBI = Runs batted in

Player	G	AB	H	Avg.	HR	RBI
Ben Paschal	89	247	89	.360	12	55
Wally Pipp	62	178	41	.230	3	24
Ernie Johnson	76	170	48	.282	5	17
Wally Schang	73	167	40	.240	2	24
Howie Shanks	66	155	40	.258	1	18
Bobby Veach	56	116	41	.353	0	16
Mark Koenig	28	110	23	.209	0	4
Steve O'Neill	35	91	26	.286	1	10
Everett Scott	22	60	13	.217	0	4
Whitey Witt	31	40	8	.200	0	0
Roy Luebbe	8	15	0	.000	0	3
Fred Merkle	7	13	5	.385	0	4
Fred Hofmann	3	2	0	.000	0	0
Leo Durocher	2	1	0	.000	0	0
Heinie Odom	1	1	1	1.000	0	0

=== Pitching ===
==== Starting pitchers ====
Note: G = Games pitched; IP = Innings pitched; W = Wins; L = Losses; ERA = Earned run average; SO = Strikeouts

Player	G	IP	W	L	ERA	SO
Herb Pennock	47	277.0	16	17	2.96	88
Sam Jones	43	246.2	15	21	4.63	92
Urban Shocker	41	244.1	12	12	3.65	74
Waite Hoyt	46	243.0	11	14	4.00	86
Bob Shawkey	33	186.0	6	14	4.11	81

==== Other pitchers ====
Note: G = Games pitched; IP = Innings pitched; W = Wins; L = Losses; ERA = Earned run average; SO = Strikeouts

Player	G	IP	W	L	ERA	SO
Hank Johnson	24	67.0	1	3	6.85	25
Alex Ferguson	21	54.1	4	2	7.79	20
Ben Shields	4	24.0	3	0	4.88	5
Garland Braxton	3	19.1	1	1	6.52	11

==== Relief pitchers ====
Note: G = Games pitched; W = Wins; L = Losses; SV = Saves; ERA = Earned run average; SO = Strikeouts

Player	G	W	L	SV	ERA	SO
Walter Beall	8	0	1	0	12.71	8
Ray Francis	4	0	0	0	7.71	1
Charlie Caldwell	3	0	0	0	16.88	1
Jim Marquis	2	0	0	0	9.82	0
