= 1927 Cleveland Indians season =

1927 Cleveland Indians
- League: American League
- Ballpark: Dunn Field
- City: Cleveland, Ohio
- Owners: Alva Bradley
- General managers: Billy Evans
- Managers: Jack McCallister

The 1927 Cleveland Indians season was a season in American baseball. The team finished sixth in the American League with a record of 66–87, 43½ games behind the New York Yankees.

== Offseason ==
- January 31, 1927: Tris Speaker was released by the Indians.

== Regular season ==
=== Season standings ===
American League
Team	W	L	Pct.	GB	Home	Road
New York Yankees	110	44	.714	—	57‍–‍19	53‍–‍25
Philadelphia Athletics	91	63	.591	19	50‍–‍27	41‍–‍36
Washington Senators	85	69	.552	25	51‍–‍28	34‍–‍41
Detroit Tigers	82	71	.536	27½	44‍–‍32	38‍–‍39
Chicago White Sox	70	83	.458	39½	38‍–‍37	32‍–‍46
Cleveland Indians	66	87	.431	43½	35‍–‍42	31‍–‍45
St. Louis Browns	59	94	.386	50½	38‍–‍38	21‍–‍56
Boston Red Sox	51	103	.331	59	29‍–‍49	22‍–‍54

=== Record vs. opponents ===
1927 American League record Sources:
Team	BOS	CWS	CLE	DET	NYY	PHA	SLB	WSH
Boston	—	11–11	15–7	5–17	4–18	6–16	6–16	4–18
Chicago	11–11	—	8–14	13–8	5–17	8–14	15–7	10–12
Cleveland	7–15	14–8	—	7–15	10–12	10–12	10–11	8–14
Detroit	17–5	8–13	15–7	—	8–14	9–13	14–8–1	11–11–2
New York	18–4	17–5	12–10	14–8	—	14–8–1	21–1	14–8
Philadelphia	16–6	14–8	12–10	13–9	8–14–1	—	16–6	12–10
St. Louis	16–6	7–15	11–10	8–14–1	1–21	6–16	—	10–12–1
Washington	18–4	12–10	14–8	11–11–2	8–14	10–12	12–10–1	—

=== Notable transactions ===
- June 15, 1927: Bernie Neis was purchased from the Indians by the Chicago White Sox.

=== Roster ===
1927 Cleveland Indians
Roster
Pitchers: Jumbo Brown; Garland Buckeye; Hap Collard; Wes Ferrell; George Grant; Willis Hudlin; Benn Karr; Dutch Levsen; Hal McKain; Jake Miller; Joe Shaute; Sherry Smith; George Uhle; Willie Underhill	Catchers: Chick Autry; Glenn Myatt; Luke Sewell; Infielders: Johnny Burnett; George Burns; Lew Fonseca; Johnny Hodapp; Carl Lind; Rube Lutzke; Ernie Padgett; Joe Sewell; Freddy Spurgeon; Dutch Ussat	Outfielders: Nick Cullop; Ike Eichrodt; George Gerken; Johnny Gill; Baby Doll Jacobson; Charlie Jamieson; Sam Langford; Pat McNulty; Bernie Neis; Homer Summa	Manager: Jack McCallister; Coaches: Harry Mathews

== Player stats ==
=== Batting ===
==== Starters by position ====
Note: Pos = Position; G = Games played; AB = At bats; H = Hits; Avg. = Batting average; HR = Home runs; RBI = Runs batted in

Pos	Player	G	AB	H	Avg.	HR	RBI
C	Luke Sewell	128	470	138	.294	0	53
1B	George Burns	140	549	175	.319	3	78
2B	Lew Fonseca	112	428	133	.311	2	40
SS	Joe Sewell	153	569	180	.316	1	92
3B	Rube Lutzke	100	311	78	.251	0	41
OF	Homer Summa	145	574	164	.286	4	74
OF	Charlie Jamieson	127	489	151	.309	0	36
OF	Ike Eichrodt	85	267	59	.221	0	25

==== Other batters ====
Note: G = Games played; AB = At bats; H = Hits; Avg. = Batting average; HR = Home runs; RBI = Runs batted in

Player	G	AB	H	Avg.	HR	RBI
Johnny Hodapp	79	240	73	.304	5	40
Freddy Spurgeon	57	179	45	.251	1	19
Baby Doll Jacobson	32	103	26	.252	0	13
Bernie Neis	32	96	29	.302	4	18
Glenn Myatt	55	94	23	.245	2	8
Nick Cullop	32	68	16	.235	1	8
Sam Langford	20	67	18	.269	1	7
Johnny Gill	21	60	13	.217	1	4
Chick Autry	16	43	11	.256	0	7
Pat McNulty	19	41	13	.317	0	4
Carl Lind	12	37	5	.135	0	1
Dutch Ussat	4	16	3	.188	0	2
George Gerken	6	14	3	.214	0	2
Johnny Burnett	17	8	0	.000	0	0
Ernie Padgett	7	7	2	.286	0	0

=== Pitching ===
==== Starting pitchers ====
Note: G = Games pitched; IP = Innings pitched; W = Wins; L = Losses; ERA = Earned run average; SO = Strikeouts

Player	G	IP	W	L	ERA	SO
Willis Hudlin	43	264.2	18	12	4.01	65
Joe Shaute	45	230.1	9	16	4.22	63
Garland Buckeye	35	204.2	10	17	3.96	38
Jake Miller	34	185.1	10	8	3.21	53
George Uhle	25	153.1	8	9	4.34	69

==== Other pitchers ====
Note: G = Games pitched; IP = Innings pitched; W = Wins; L = Losses; ERA = Earned run average; SO = Strikeouts

Player	G	IP	W	L	ERA	SO
Dutch Levsen	25	80.1	3	7	5.49	15
Benn Karr	22	76.2	3	3	5.05	17
Sherry Smith	11	38.0	1	4	5.45	8
Hal McKain	2	11.0	0	1	4.09	5
Willie Underhill	4	8.1	0	2	9.72	4

==== Relief pitchers ====
Note: G = Games pitched; W = Wins; L = Losses; SV = Saves; ERA = Earned run average; SO = Strikeouts

Player	G	W	L	SV	ERA	SO
George Grant	25	4	6	1	4.46	19
Jumbo Brown	8	0	2	0	6.27	8
Hap Collard	4	0	0	0	5.06	2
Nick Cullop	1	0	0	0	9.00	0
Wes Ferrell	1	0	0	0	27.00	0

== Farm system ==
Level	Team	League	Manager
B	Terre Haute Tots	Illinois–Indiana–Iowa League	Bob Wells
