= List of Major League Baseball players (U) =

The following is a list of Major League Baseball players, retired or active. As of the end of the 2010 season, there have been 53 players with a last name that begins with U who have been on a major league roster at some point.

== U ==
Name	Debut	Final game	Position	Teams	Ref
Jimmy Uchrinscko	July 20, 1926	July 27, 1926	Pitcher	Washington Senators	
Bob Uecker	April 13, 1962	September 29, 1967	Catcher	Milwaukee Braves, St. Louis Cardinals, Philadelphia Phillies, Atlanta Braves	
Koji Uehara	April 8, 2009		Pitcher	Baltimore Orioles, Texas Rangers	
Dan Uggla	April 3, 2006		Second baseman	Florida Marlins, Atlanta Braves	
Luis Ugueto	April 3, 2002	September 23, 2003	Utility infielder	Seattle Mariners	
Frenchy Uhalt	April 17, 1934	July 1, 1934	Outfielder	Chicago White Sox	
Bob Uhl	May 8, 1938	September 14, 1940	Pitcher	Chicago White Sox, Detroit Tigers	
Ted Uhlaender	September 4, 1965	September 30, 1972	Outfielder	Minnesota Twins, Cleveland Indians, Cincinnati Reds	
George Uhle	April 30, 1919	September 22, 1936	Pitcher	Cleveland Indians, Detroit Tigers, New York Giants, New York Yankees	
Maury Uhler	April 14, 1914	July 23, 1914	Outfielder	Cincinnati Reds	
Charlie Uhlir	August 3, 1934	September 22, 1934	Outfielder	Chicago White Sox	
Jerry Ujdur	August 17, 1980	September 28, 1984	Pitcher	Detroit Tigers, Cleveland Indians	
Mike Ulicny	May 5, 1945	June 22, 1945	Catcher	Boston Braves	
Scott Ullger	April 17, 1983	September 30, 1983	First baseman	Minnesota Twins	
Sandy Ullrich	May 3, 1944	September 16, 1945	Pitcher	Washington Senators	
Dutch Ulrich	April 18, 1925	October 1, 1927	Pitcher	Philadelphia Phillies	
George Ulrich	May 1, 1892	August 7, 1896	Outfielder	Washington Senators (1891–99), Cincinnati Reds, New York Giants	
Arnold Umbach	October 3, 1964	July 19, 1966	Pitcher	Milwaukee/Atlanta Braves	
Jim Umbarger	April 8, 1975	September 28, 1978	Pitcher	Texas Rangers, Oakland Athletics	
Jim Umbricht	September 26, 1959	September 29, 1963	Pitcher	Pittsburgh Pirates, Houston Colt .45s	
Tom Umphlett	April 16, 1953	September 24, 1955	Outfielder	Boston Red Sox, Washington Senators	
Willie Underhill	September 8, 1927	September 27, 1928	Pitcher	Cleveland Indians	
Fred Underwood	July 18, 1894	August 30, 1894	Pitcher	Brooklyn Grooms	
Pat Underwood	May 31, 1979	June 21, 1983	Pitcher	Detroit Tigers	
Tom Underwood	August 19, 1974	September 23, 1984	Pitcher	Philadelphia Phillies, St. Louis Cardinals, Toronto Blue Jays, New York Yankees, Oakland Athletics, Baltimore Orioles	
Bob Unglaub	April 15, 1904	September 17, 1910	First baseman	New York Highlanders, Boston Americans/Red Sox, Washington Senators	
Tim Unroe	May 30, 1995	September 30, 2000	First baseman	Milwaukee Brewers, Anaheim Angels, Atlanta Braves	
Al Unser	September 14, 1942	September 5, 1945	Catcher	Detroit Tigers, Cincinnati Reds	
Del Unser	April 10, 1968	June 6, 1982	Outfielder	Washington Senators (1961–1971), Cleveland Indians, Philadelphia Phillies, New York Mets, Montreal Expos	
Woody Upchurch	September 14, 1935	May 24, 1936	Pitcher	Philadelphia Athletics	
Bill Upham	April 10, 1915	June 26, 1918	Pitcher	Brooklyn Tip-Tops, Boston Braves	
John Upham	April 16, 1967	September 25, 1968	Pitcher	Chicago Cubs	
Jerry Upp	September 2, 1909	September 27, 1909	Pitcher	Cleveland Naps	
Dixie Upright	April 18, 1953	May 10, 1953	Pinch hitter	St. Louis Browns	
Cecil Upshaw	October 1, 1966	September 28, 1975	Pitcher	Atlanta Braves, Houston Astros, Cleveland Indians, New York Yankees, Chicago White Sox	
Willie Upshaw	April 9, 1978	September 28, 1988	First baseman	Toronto Blue Jays, Cleveland Indians	
B. J. Upton	August 2, 2004		Outfielder	Tampa Bay Devil Rays/Rays	
Bill Upton	April 13, 1954	May 3, 1954	Pitcher	Philadelphia Athletics	
Justin Upton	August 2, 2007		Outfielder	Arizona Diamondbacks	
Tom Upton	April 19, 1950	April 30, 1952	Shortstop	St. Louis Browns, Washington Senators	
Jack Urban	June 3, 1957	August 6, 1959	Pitcher	Kansas City Athletics, St. Louis Cardinals	
Luke Urban	July 19, 1927	June 21, 1928	Catcher	Boston Braves	
Tom Urbani	April 21, 1993	August 4, 1996	Pitcher	St. Louis Cardinals, Detroit Tigers	
Billy Urbanski	July 4, 1931	April 23, 1937	Shortstop	Boston Braves/Bees	
Ugueth Urbina	May 9, 1995	October 2, 2005	Pitcher	Montreal Expos, Boston Red Sox, Texas Rangers, Florida Marlins, Detroit Tigers, Philadelphia Phillies	
Lino Urdaneta	September 9, 2004	May 7, 2007	Pitcher	Detroit Tigers, New York Mets	
José Uribe	September 13, 1984	October 3, 1993	Shortstop	St. Louis Cardinals, San Francisco Giants, Houston Astros	
Juan Uribe	April 8, 2001		Shortstop	Colorado Rockies, Chicago White Sox, San Francisco Giants, Los Angeles Dodgers	
John Urrea	April 10, 1977	October 4, 1981	Pitcher	St. Louis Cardinals, San Diego Padres	
Lon Ury	September 9, 1903	September 12, 1903	First baseman	St. Louis Cardinals	
Bob Usher	April 16, 1946	September 19, 1957	Outfielder	Cincinnati Reds, Chicago Cubs, Cleveland Indians, Washington Senators	
Dutch Ussat	September 13, 1925	October 2, 1927	Third baseman	Cleveland Indians	
Chase Utley	April 4, 2003		Second baseman	Philadelphia Phillies	
