= Jack McCallister =

Jack McCallister may refer to:

- Jack McCallister (Jack & Bobby)
- Jack McCallister (baseball) (1879–1946), manager of the Cleveland Indians
- Jack McCallister, a character from the 2005 film Fun with Dick and Jane, played by Alec Baldwin
