= Patrick Simmons (disambiguation) =

Patrick Simmons (born 1948) is an American guitarist and singer.

Patrick Simmons may also refer to:

- Patrick Simmons (politician), Grenadian politician
- Pat Simmons (baseball) (Patrick Clement Simmons, 1908–1968), relief pitcher in Major League Baseball

== See also ==
- Pat Simmons (disambiguation)
