= Carl Lind =

Carl Lind may refer to:

- Carl Johan Lind (1883–1965), Swedish athlete who competed in the 1912 Summer Olympics
- Carl Lind (baseball) (1903–1946), Major League Baseball second baseman
