= Pat Simmons =

Pat Simmons may refer to:

- Pat Simmons (voice actress) (1920–2005), voice of the United Kingdom's Speaking Clock from 1963 until 1985
- Pat Simmons (curler) (born 1974), Canadian curler
- Pat Simmons (baseball) (1908–1968), relief pitcher in Major League Baseball

== See also ==
- Patrick Simmons (disambiguation)
