= Bill Moore (catcher) =

American baseball player (1901–1972)

- Catcher
- Born: December 12, 1901; Kansas City, Missouri, U.S.
- Died: May 24, 1972 (aged 70); Kansas City, Missouri, U.S.
- Batted: Left Threw: Right

MLB debut
- September 7, 1926, for the Boston Red Sox

Last MLB appearance
- October 1, 1927, for the Boston Red Sox

MLB statistics
- Batting average: .207
- Home runs: 0
- Runs batted in: 4
- Stats at Baseball Reference

Teams
- Boston Red Sox (1926–1927)

William Henry Moore (December 12, 1901 – May 24, 1972) was an American backup catcher in Major League Baseball who played in parts of the 1926 and 1927 seasons for the Boston Red Sox. Listed at 5 11", 170 lb., Moore batted left-handed and threw right-handed. He was born in Kansas City, Missouri.

In a 20-game career, Moore was a .207 hitter (18-for-87) with nine runs, two doubles, and four RBI without home runs.

Moore died at the age of 70 in his hometown of Kansas City, Missouri.

== See also ==
- 1926 Boston Red Sox season
- 1927 Boston Red Sox season
