= Paul Hinson =

American baseball player (1904–1960)

- Hinson as a police officer, c. 1957
- Pinch runner
- Born: May 9, 1904; Vanleer, Tennessee, U.S.
- Died: September 23, 1960 (aged 56); Muskogee, Oklahoma, U.S.
- Batted: Right Threw: Right

MLB debut
- April 19, 1928, for the Boston Red Sox

Last MLB appearance
- May 30, 1928, for the Boston Red Sox

MLB statistics
- Games played: 3
- Plate appearances: 0
- Runs scored: 1
- Stats at Baseball Reference

Teams
- Boston Red Sox (1928)

James Paul Hinson (May 9, 1904 – September 23, 1960) was an American professional baseball shortstop and third baseman who made three appearances for the 1928 Boston Red Sox of Major League Baseball (MLB) as a pinch runner. Listed at 5 feet 10 inches (1.78 m) and 150 pounds (68 kg), he batted and threw right-handed. He later served as a police officer in Muskogee, Oklahoma.

== Biography ==
Hinson played in minor league baseball from 1927 to 1930, and again in 1933. In five minor league seasons, he appeared in at least 340 games, with over 140 appearances at both shortstop and third base. Hinson led the Western Association in stolen bases in 1927, with 48 steals in 120 games; he had a .315 batting average that season and had a .922 fielding percentage at third base. He batted .306 in 1929 and .307 in 1930; records for some of his other seasons are incomplete.

Hinson appeared in three major league games for the Boston Red Sox in 1928, each time as a pinch runner. He scored one run, and did not get a plate appearance or play defensively. Hinson's first and most successful pinch running appearance came on April 19 against the New York Yankees, in the first game of a home doubleheader at Fenway Park. With the Yankees leading, 6–3, Johnnie Heving led off the bottom of the eighth inning as a pinch hitter for the pitcher; he singled, and Hinson entered the game to run for him. Ira Flagstead doubled, advancing Hinson to third base, followed by a ground out by Phil Todt, scoring Hinson. The Red Sox scored three more runs to take the lead, 7–6. In the top of the ninth inning, pitcher Red Ruffing entered the game in place of Hinson, and held the Yankees scoreless to earn a save. Hinson pinch ran in two other games, on May 7 and May 30, but did not score either time. At the beginning of June, the Red Sox optioned Hinson to the Salem Witches of the New England League; he successfully stole home in his first game with Salem.

As well as Hinson and sprinter Herb Washington, several other players have made a majority of their major league appearances a pinch runner, notably Mel Kerr for the 1925 Chicago Cubs and Gary Hargis for the 1979 Pittsburgh Pirates. Other teams have occasionally kept pinch-running specialists for brief stretches, such as Matt Alexander, Allan Lewis, Don Hopkins and Larry Lintz.

Hinson was born in 1904 in Vanleer, Tennessee. During and after his baseball career, he served as a police officer in Muskogee, Oklahoma, where he was shot in the hip in November 1930 while attempting to capture a burglary suspect. Hinson ultimately became the chief of police, before leaving the force in 1957. He died by suicide in Muskogee at the age of 56 in 1960. He was married, with no children.
