= Steve Slayton =

American baseball player (1902–1984)

- Pitcher
- Born: April 26, 1902; Barre, Vermont, U.S.
- Died: December 20, 1984 (aged 82); Manchester, New Hampshire, U.S.
- Batted: Right Threw: Right

MLB debut
- July 21, 1928, for the Boston Red Sox

Last MLB appearance
- July 28, 1928, for the Boston Red Sox

MLB statistics
- Win–loss record: 0–0
- Earned run average: 3.86
- Strikeouts: 2
- Stats at Baseball Reference

Teams
- Boston Red Sox (1928)

Foster Herbert "Steve" Slayton (April 26, 1902 – December 20, 1984) was an American professional baseball relief pitcher who played briefly for the 1928 Boston Red Sox of Major League Baseball (MLB). Listed at 6 feet 0 inches (1.83 m) and 163 pounds (74 kg), Slayton batted and threw right-handed.

== Biography ==
A native of Barre, Vermont, Slayton attended the University of New Hampshire where he played college baseball and college basketball. He was a member of the varsity baseball team in 1926, 1927, and 1928.

Slayton played minor league baseball during 1928 and 1929 for four different teams. He pitched in 28 games, compiling a win–loss record of 4–14. Slayton's major league career was limited to three appearances for the Boston Red Sox during a one-week period in July 1928. On July 21, he pitched the final inning of a Boston home loss to the Cleveland Indians, allowing no runs. On July 25, he pitched the final 4 1/3 innings of a Boston road loss to Cleveland, allowing one run. One July 28, he pitched 1 2/3 innings of a Boston road loss to the Detroit Tigers, allowing two runs. His total of seven innings pitched while allowing three runs yielded a 3.86 ERA. He recorded two strikeouts while allowing six hits and three walks, without registering a decision or a save.

Following his professional baseball career, Slayton was a high school coach in Vermont and New Hampshire; he coached the Spaulding High School baseball team in his hometown to four state championships; he retired in 1966. Slayton died in 1984 at the age of 82 in Manchester, New Hampshire. He was inducted to the University of New Hampshire's athletic hall of fame in 1986.
