= Freddie Moncewicz =

American baseball player (1903–1969)

- Shortstop
- Born: September 1, 1903; Brockton, Massachusetts, U.S.
- Died: April 23, 1969 (aged 65); Brockton, Massachusetts, U.S.
- Batted: Right Threw: Right

MLB debut
- June 19, 1928, for the Boston Red Sox

Last MLB appearance
- July 3, 1928, for the Boston Red Sox

MLB statistics
- Games played: 3
- At bats: 1
- Strikeouts: 1
- Stats at Baseball Reference

Teams
- Boston Red Sox (1928)

Frederick Alfred Moncewicz (September 1, 1903 – April 23, 1969) was an American professional baseball player. He played three games in Major League Baseball for the Boston Red Sox in 1928. Listed at 5 ft 8.5 in (1.74 m). 175 lb., Moncewicz batted and threw right-handed.

== Biography ==
A native of Brockton, Massachusetts, Moncewicz was the son of Polish immigrants, and was a standout student and athlete at Brockton High School and Boston College. He played shortstop for Boston College from 1925 to 1928, where his manager was former major leaguer Jack Slattery. While at B.C., he also played varsity football and basketball.

From 1923 to 1927, he played summer baseball in the Cape Cod Baseball League for the Hyannis town team, leading the team to league titles as player/manager in 1926 and 1927. After his brief major league stint, Moncewicz returned to the league to play for the Hyannis/Barnstable team for several seasons through 1933, and for the Bourne team in 1934 and 1935. Moncewicz also played basketball on Cape Cod, and in December of 1923, his team, the Mill Hill Five, played a game in Yarmouth against the Brockton OKO's before a throng of fans that included Baseball Hall of Famer Babe Ruth.

After graduating from Boston College in 1928, Moncewicz was signed to a contract with the Boston Red Sox, and appeared in three games for the Red Sox during their 1928 season. His major league debut came on June 19 as Boston faced the Washington Senators in the second game of a doubleheader at Griffith Stadium. Moncewicz was inserted as a late-inning replacement for shortstop Wally Gerber, and was struck out by Washington hurler Firpo Marberry in his only at-bat. Red Sox Hall of Famer Red Ruffing took the loss in Boston's 16-7 defeat. The following day, Moncewicz was again brought in late for Gerber, but did not come to bat. Moncewicz's third and final major league appearance came on July 2 in the opener of a doubleheader at Shibe Park against Connie Mack's Philadelphia A's, a team that boasted several future Hall of Famers in the day's lineup, including Ty Cobb, Jimmie Foxx and Lefty Grove. Ruffing, though a pitcher, had been brought in to pinch-hit for Boston's starter, Merle Settlemire. Ruffing knocked a single, and Moncewicz was brought in to pinch-run, but did not score and did not remain in the game, which Boston lost, 9-2.

In the fall of 1928, Moncewicz married fellow Brockton native Margaret Chalitco. In 1929, Moncewicz played for the Pittsfield Hillies of the Eastern League. He returned to his alma mater in 1931 to serve as Boston College's freshman baseball coach, and in 1932 was assistant varsity coach under Frank McCrehan. Moncewicz later graduated from Boston College Law School.

During World War II, Moncewicz was a lieutenant commander in the United States Navy, and served aboard the aircraft carrier USS Antietam in the South Pacific. Following his service, Moncewicz was named to the post of state comptroller by Massachusetts Governor Maurice J. Tobin in 1946, serving continuously until 1958, when he retired for health reasons. Moncewicz died in 1969 at the age of 65 in his hometown of Brockton.

== See also ==
- 1928 Boston Red Sox season
