= Roy Luebbe =

American baseball player

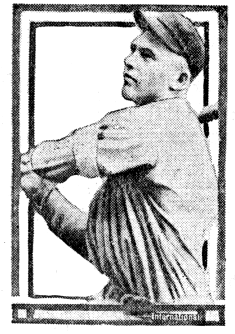
- Catcher
- Born: September 17, 1900; Parkersburg, Iowa, U.S.
- Died: August 21, 1985 (aged 84); Papillion, Nebraska, U.S.
- Batted: Both Threw: Right

MLB debut
- August 22, 1925, for the New York Yankees

Last MLB appearance
- September 19, 1925, for the New York Yankees

MLB statistics
- Plate appearances: 15
- Hits: 0
- Runs batted in: 3
- Stats at Baseball Reference

Teams
- New York Yankees (1925)

Roy John Luebbe (September 17, 1900 – August 21, 1985) was an American Major League Baseball catcher who played in eight games for the New York Yankees during the 1925 season. He was hitless in 15 at-bats and was a switch hitter who threw right-handed.

Despite not having recorded a hit, Luebbe was credited with three runs batted in in his career, the most of any such player as of 2021. On September 8, 1925, he drove in Ben Paschal and Babe Ruth with a fielder's choice and base on balls respectively. On September 16, he drove in Paschal with a sacrifice fly.

Luebbe was born in Parkersburg, Iowa, and died in Papillion, Nebraska.
