= Wheaton, Kansas =

City in Pottawatomie County, Kansas

- City
- Location within Pottawatomie County and Kansas

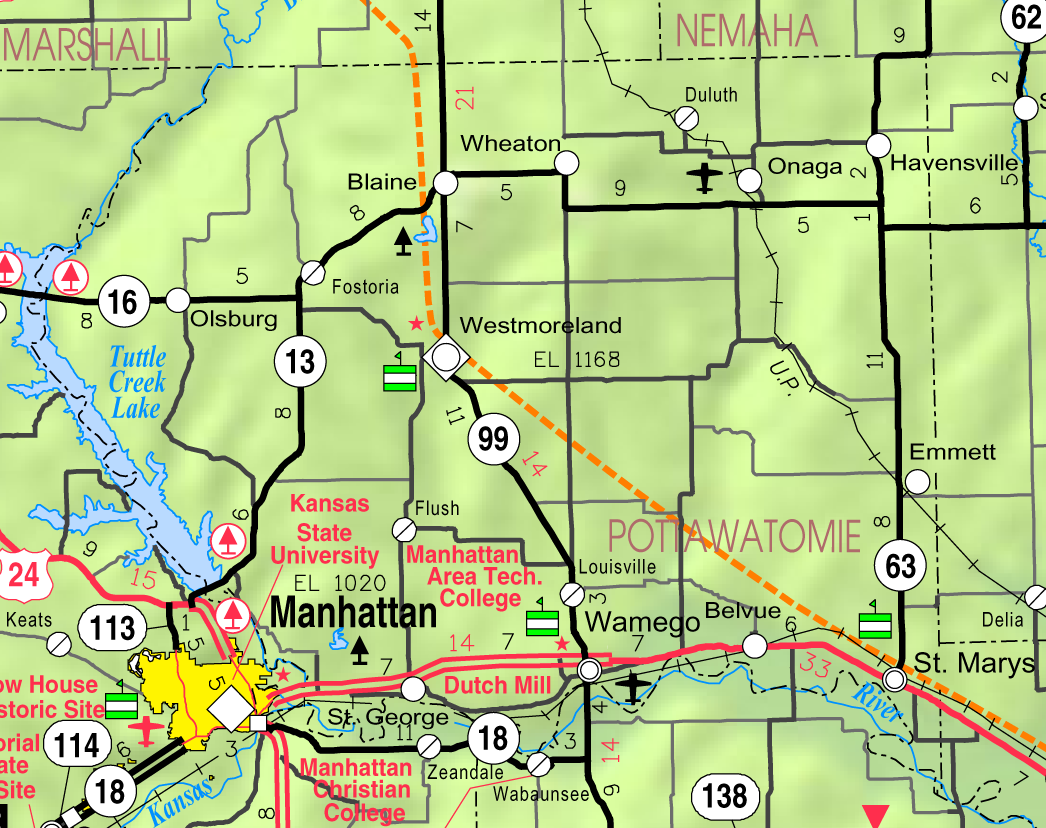
- KDOT map of Pottawatomie County (legend)
- Coordinates: 39°30′07″N 96°19′08″W
- Country: United States
- State: Kansas
- County: Pottawatomie
- Incorporated: 1926

Area
  - Total: 0.15 sq mi (0.40 km^{2})
  - Land: 0.15 sq mi (0.40 km^{2})
  - Water: 0 sq mi (0.00 km^{2})
- Elevation: 1,506 ft (459 m)

Population (2020)
  - Total: 98
  - Density: 630/sq mi (250/km^{2})
- Time zone: UTC-6 (CST)
  - Summer (DST): UTC-5 (CDT)
- ZIP Code: 66521
- Area code: 785
- FIPS code: 20-77700
- GNIS ID: 2397297

Wheaton is a city in Pottawatomie County, Kansas, United States. As of the 2020 census, the population of the city was 98.

== History ==
The first post office in Wheaton was established in 1870, but it was called Leghorn until 1883. The post office remained in operation until it was discontinued in 1992.

== Geography ==
According to the United States Census Bureau, the city has a total area of 0.15 square miles (0.39 km^{2}), all land.

== Demographics ==
Historical population
Census	Pop.	Note	%±
1930	170		—
1940	155		−8.8%
1950	134		−13.5%
1960	114		−14.9%
1970	106		−7.0%
1980	90		−15.1%
1990	106		17.8%
2000	92		−13.2%
2010	95		3.3%
2020	98		3.2%
U.S. Decennial Census

Wheaton is part of the Manhattan, Kansas Metropolitan Statistical Area.

=== 2010 census ===
As of the census of 2010, there were 95 people, 34 households, and 24 families residing in the city. The population density was 633.3 inhabitants per square mile (244.5/km^{2}). There were 51 housing units at an average density of 340.0 per square mile (131.3/km^{2}). The racial makeup of the city was 97.9% White and 2.1% from other races. Hispanic or Latino of any race were 8.4% of the population.

There were 34 households, of which 35.3% had children under the age of 18 living with them, 61.8% were married couples living together, 2.9% had a female householder with no husband present, 5.9% had a male householder with no wife present, and 29.4% were non-families. 17.6% of all households were made up of individuals, and 2.9% had someone living alone who was 65 years of age or older. The average household size was 2.79 and the average family size was 3.33.

The median age in the city was 39.5 years. 33.7% of residents were under the age of 18; 4.3% were between the ages of 18 and 24; 24.2% were from 25 to 44; 24.2% were from 45 to 64; and 13.7% were 65 years of age or older. The gender makeup of the city was 51.6% male and 48.4% female.

=== 2000 census ===
As of the census of 2000, there were 92 people, 34 households, and 24 families residing in the city. The population density was 629.3 inhabitants per square mile (243.0/km^{2}). There were 41 housing units at an average density of 280.5 per square mile (108.3/km^{2}). The racial makeup of the city was 95.65% White, 1.09% Asian, and 3.26% from two or more races.

There were 34 households, out of which 32.4% had children under the age of 18 living with them, 58.8% were married couples living together, 8.8% had a female householder with no husband present, and 29.4% were non-families. 20.6% of all households were made up of individuals, and 11.8% had someone living alone who was 65 years of age or older. The average household size was 2.71 and the average family size was 3.29.

In the city, the population was spread out, with 33.7% under the age of 18, 4.3% from 18 to 24, 30.4% from 25 to 44, 13.0% from 45 to 64, and 18.5% who were 65 years of age or older. The median age was 32 years. For every 100 females, there were 95.7 males. For every 100 females age 18 and over, there were 79.4 males.

The median income for a household in the city was $26,500, and the median income for a family was $28,750. Males had a median income of $17,917 versus $18,750 for females. The per capita income for the city was $9,402. There were 20.0% of families and 38.4% of the population living below the poverty line, including 66.0% of under eighteens and none of those over 64.

== Education ==
The community is served by Onaga USD 322 public school district.

== Notable people ==
- Frank Bushey, baseball pitcher over parts of two seasons for Boston Red Sox
