= John Shea (baseball) =

American baseball player (1904–1956)

- Pitcher
- Born: December 27, 1904; Everett, Massachusetts, US
- Died: November 30, 1956 (aged 51); Malden, Massachusetts, US
- Batted: Left Threw: Left

MLB debut
- June 30, 1928, for the Boston Red Sox

Last MLB appearance
- June 30, 1928, for the Boston Red Sox

MLB statistics
- Win–loss record: 0–0
- Earned run average: 18.00
- Strikeouts: 0
- Stats at Baseball Reference

Teams
- Boston Red Sox (1928)

John Michael Joseph Shea (December 27, 1904 – November 30, 1956) was an American professional baseball relief pitcher who played one game for the 1928 Boston Red Sox of Major League Baseball (MLB). Listed at 5 feet 10.5 inches (1.791 m) and 171 pounds (78 kg), he threw and batted left-handed.

== Biography ==
Shea, nicknamed "Lefty", was signed by the Boston Red Sox on June 15, 1928, the day after he graduated from Boston College, where he had played college baseball. He made his first professional appearance two weeks later, on June 30; it was also Shea's only major league appearance. Hosting the New York Yankees at Fenway Park, the Red Sox were trailing, 9–3, at the end of the eighth inning in the first game of a doubleheader. Shea was brought in to pitch the top of the ninth; the first batter that he faced was Lou Gehrig, whom he walked. This was followed by a double and then three ground outs, which allowed two of the Yankees to score. Thus, Shea was charged with two earned runs in one inning pitched, for an earned run average of 18.00

Shea went on to have a brief minor league career, pitching for the Pittsfield Hillies of the Eastern League in 1928 and 1929.

A native of Everett, Massachusetts, Shea died in 1956, aged 51, at his home in Malden, Massachusetts.
