= Bob Cremins =

American baseball player (1906–2004)

- Pitcher
- Born: February 15, 1906; Pelham Manor, New York
- Died: March 27, 2004 (aged 98); Pelham Manor, New York
- Batted: Left Threw: Left

MLB debut
- August 17, 1927, for the Boston Red Sox

Last MLB appearance
- September 17, 1927, for the Boston Red Sox
- Stats at Baseball Reference

Teams
- Boston Red Sox (1927)

Robert Anthony Cremins (February 15, 1906 – March 27, 2004) was a pitcher in Major League Baseball who played briefly for the Boston Red Sox during the 1927 season. Listed at 5 ft 11 in (1.80 m), 178 lb., Cremins batted and threw left-handed. He was born in Pelham Manor, New York.

In four relief appearances, Cremins posted a 5.04 earned run average without a decision in 5 1/3 Innings pitched. According to Baseball Almanac, Cremins faced Babe Ruth once and retired him on a grounder to first base. His career ended in 1928 due to an arm injury.

Following his baseball career, Cremins served in the military during World War II. After that, he worked as town supervisor and tax receiver for Pelham.

Cremins died in his homeland of Pelham at the age of 98. At the time of his death, he was the second-oldest surviving major league baseball player, Ray Cunningham was the oldest.

== Fact ==
- Nicknamed "Lefty" or "Crooked Arm"
