= Charlie Barnabe =

American baseball player (1900–1977)

- Pitcher
- Born: June 12, 1900; Russell Gulch, Colorado, U.S.
- Died: August 16, 1977 (aged 77); Waco, Texas, U.S.
- Batted: Left Threw: Left

MLB debut
- April 14, 1927, for the Chicago White Sox

Last MLB appearance
- May 13, 1928, for the Chicago White Sox

MLB statistics
- Win–loss record: 0-7
- Earned run average: 5.48
- Strikeouts: 8
- Stats at Baseball Reference

Teams
- Chicago White Sox (1927–1928)

Charles Edward Barnabe (June 12, 1900 – August 16, 1977) was an American pitcher in Major League Baseball. He played for the Chicago White Sox.
