= Bob Way =

American baseball player (1906–1974)

- Second baseman
- Born: April 2, 1906; Emlenton, Pennsylvania, U.S.
- Died: June 20, 1974 (aged 68); Pittsburgh, Pennsylvania, U.S.
- Batted: Right Threw: Right

MLB debut
- April 12, 1927, for the Chicago White Sox

Last MLB appearance
- May 15, 1927, for the Chicago White Sox

MLB statistics
- Games played: 5
- At bats: 3
- Hits: 1
- Stats at Baseball Reference

Teams
- Chicago White Sox (1927)

Robert Clinton Way (April 2, 1906 – June 20, 1974) was an American Major League Baseball player who played in 1927 with the Chicago White Sox.

Way played in 5 games, going 1–3.

He was born in Emlenton, Pennsylvania, and died in Pittsburgh, Pennsylvania.
