= Ben Paschal =

American baseball player (1895–1974)

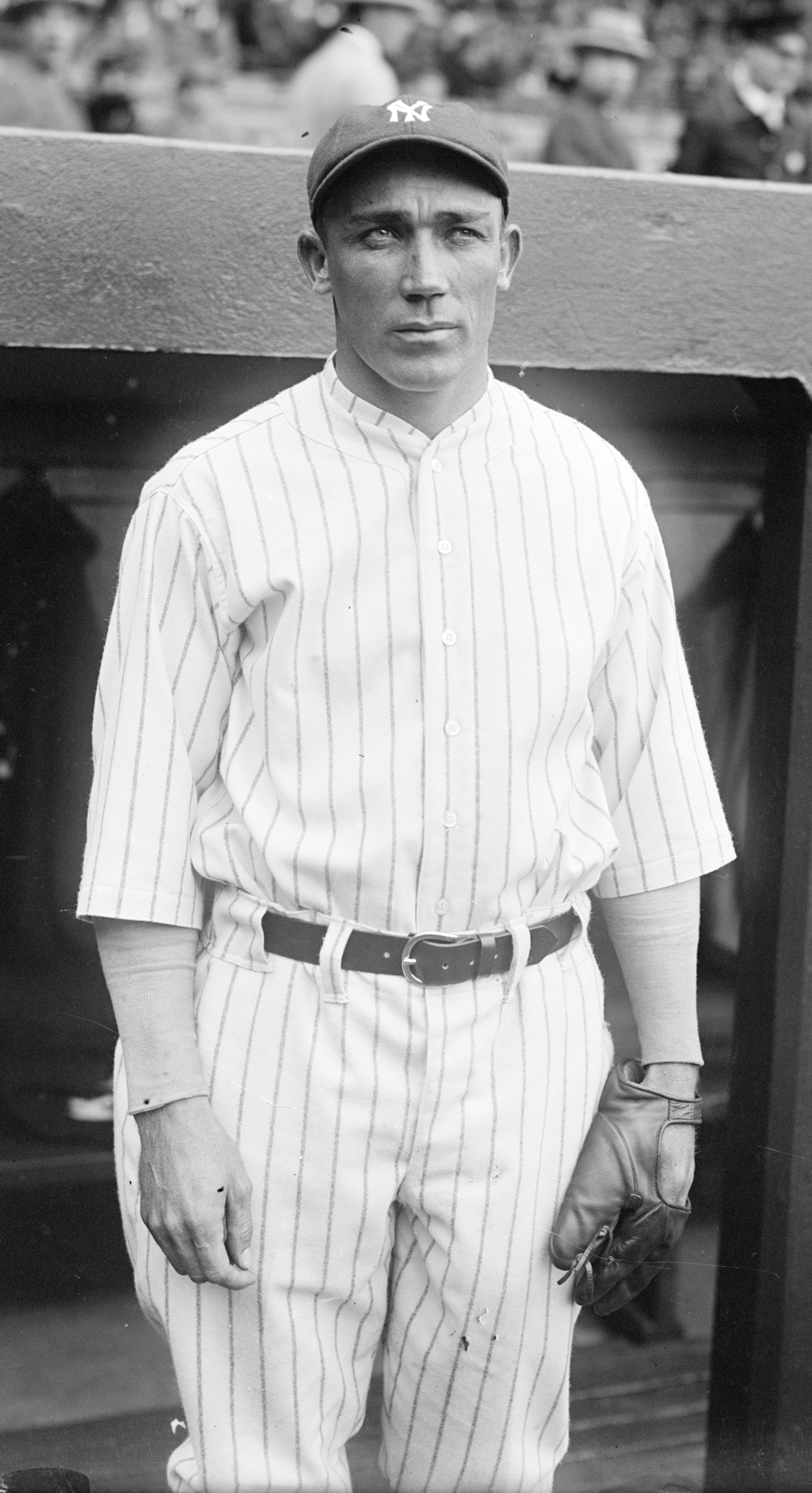
- Paschal before a game during the 1925 New York Yankees season
- Outfielder
- Born: October 13, 1895; Enterprise, Alabama, U.S.
- Died: November 10, 1974 (aged 79); Charlotte, North Carolina, U.S.
- Batted: Right Threw: Right

MLB debut
- August 16, 1915, for the Cleveland Indians

Last MLB appearance
- October 6, 1929, for the New York Yankees

MLB statistics
- Batting average: .309
- Home runs: 24
- Runs batted in: 136
- Stats at Baseball Reference

Teams
- Cleveland Indians (1915); Boston Red Sox (1920); New York Yankees (1924–1929)

Career highlights and awards
- 2× World Series champion (1927, 1928)

Benjamin Edwin Paschal (October 13, 1895 – November 10, 1974) was an American baseball outfielder who played eight seasons in Major League Baseball from 1915 to 1929, mostly for the New York Yankees. After two "cup of coffee" stints with the Cleveland Indians in 1915 and the Boston Red Sox in 1920, Paschal spent most of his career as the fourth outfielder and right-handed pinch hitter of the Yankees' Murderers' Row championship teams of the late 1920s. Paschal is best known for hitting .360 in the 1925 season while standing in for Babe Ruth, who missed the first 40 games with a stomach ailment.

During his time in baseball, Paschal was described as a five-tool player who excelled at running, throwing, fielding, hitting for average, and power. However, his playing time with the Yankees was limited because they already had future Baseball Hall of Famers Ruth and Earle Combs, and star Bob Meusel, in the outfield. Paschal was considered one of the best bench players in baseball during his time with the Yankees, and sportswriters wrote how he would have started for most other teams in the American League. He was one of the best pinch hitters in the game during the period, at a time when the term was still relatively new to baseball.

== Early life ==
Benjamin Edwin Paschal was born on October 13, 1895, Enterprise, Alabama, and is the son of farmers. He grew up in nearby Sanford.

He played collegiate sports at the University of Alabama, before beginning his professional career with Dothan of the Georgia State League, where he played with future Hall of Fame player Bill Terry. Paschal played in 64 games, with a .280 batting average, and his ability attracted the attention of scouts in the area.

== Career ==
=== Early career ===
Signed as a pinch hitter for the Cleveland Indians at age 19, Paschal appeared in nine games, collecting one hit on August 16, which broke up a no-hitter by Bernie Boland with two outs in the ninth inning. The Indians declared Paschal too inexperienced, and he was sent to the Muskegon Reds of the Central League. The league disbanded in the middle of the 1917 season, and Paschal became a free agent.

After a two-year break from baseball because of World War I, Paschal moved on to the Charlotte Hornets of the South Atlantic League, where he played from 1920 to 1923. He finished third in the league in batting average in 1920. While in the Southern League, he was nicknamed "the man who hits sticks of dynamite".

At the conclusion of the 1920 season, Paschal's contract was purchased by the Boston Red Sox, with an option to keep him if he met certain playing expectations. He appeared in nine games for the Red Sox; his first game brought three hits against pitcher José Acosta of the Washington Senators, and in total he batted .357 with five runs batted in (RBI), but the Red Sox believed he lacked fielding experience and he returned to Charlotte. In August 1921, Paschal was sold to the Rochester Red Wings. However, while sliding in a game on August 20, 1921, he suffered a broken leg which sidelined him for the rest of the season and voided the contract with the Red Wings. He was hitting .317 at the time of the injury. In 1922, Paschal played in 142 games, hitting .326 with 18 home runs and improved these figures in 1923, achieving 200 hits, 22 triples, and 26 home runs in 141 games for a batting average of .351, the fourth best in the league. Paschal began the 1924 season with the Atlanta Crackers of the Southern Association. He scored 136 runs, while batting .341 and stealing 24 bases.

=== Yankees career ===
The New York Yankees bought Paschal from the Crackers near the end of the 1924 season and he played in four games. His only three hits, as well as three RBI, came in a defeat by the Detroit Tigers on September 19.

During spring training, Paschal narrowly escaped serious injury while traveling on a bus. The vehicle rolled backwards down a hill and Paschal, along with several other teammates, jumped off before it hit a tree at high speed. The media expected Paschal to be Babe Ruth's understudy prior to the 1925 season, but Ruth collapsed at an Asheville, North Carolina train station just before the regular season's start. Emergency surgery for a "intestinal abscess" left him hospitalized for six weeks. Originally, Paschal was only to be used against left-handed pitchers, but Yankees manager Miller Huggins named him as Ruth's temporary replacement in the outfield. In the first game of the year, Paschal hit a home run in a 5–1 win against the defending World Series-champion Washington Senators. After another game-winning home run against the Senators two weeks later, the New York press noted that he was "making fans forget about Babe Ruth". Paschal's weakness against right-handed pitchers prompted the Yankees to acquire veteran outfielder Bobby Veach, but his declining skills allowed Paschal to retain his position on the team. He hit another game-winning home run against the Cleveland Indians on May 23. At the time, Paschal was fifth in the league in batting average at .403, behind Sammy Hale, Ty Cobb, Tris Speaker, and teammate Earle Combs. His six home runs in May set a Yankee rookie record for a month, later equaled by Joe Gordon, then topped by Shane Spencer's nine in September 1998.

Ruth returned to the lineup on June 1, relegating Paschal to the bench. In July, an injury to Combs allowed Paschal to start several games in center field. He then started the majority of August and all of September when Bob Meusel moved to third base to cover for an injured Joe Dugan. He hit two home runs during a September 8 game against the Red Sox, but his season ended when he was hit on the leg with a pitch on September 12 against the Philadelphia Athletics. In 89 games, Paschal's batting average for the season was .360, 70 points higher than Ruth, with 12 home runs and 56 RBI.

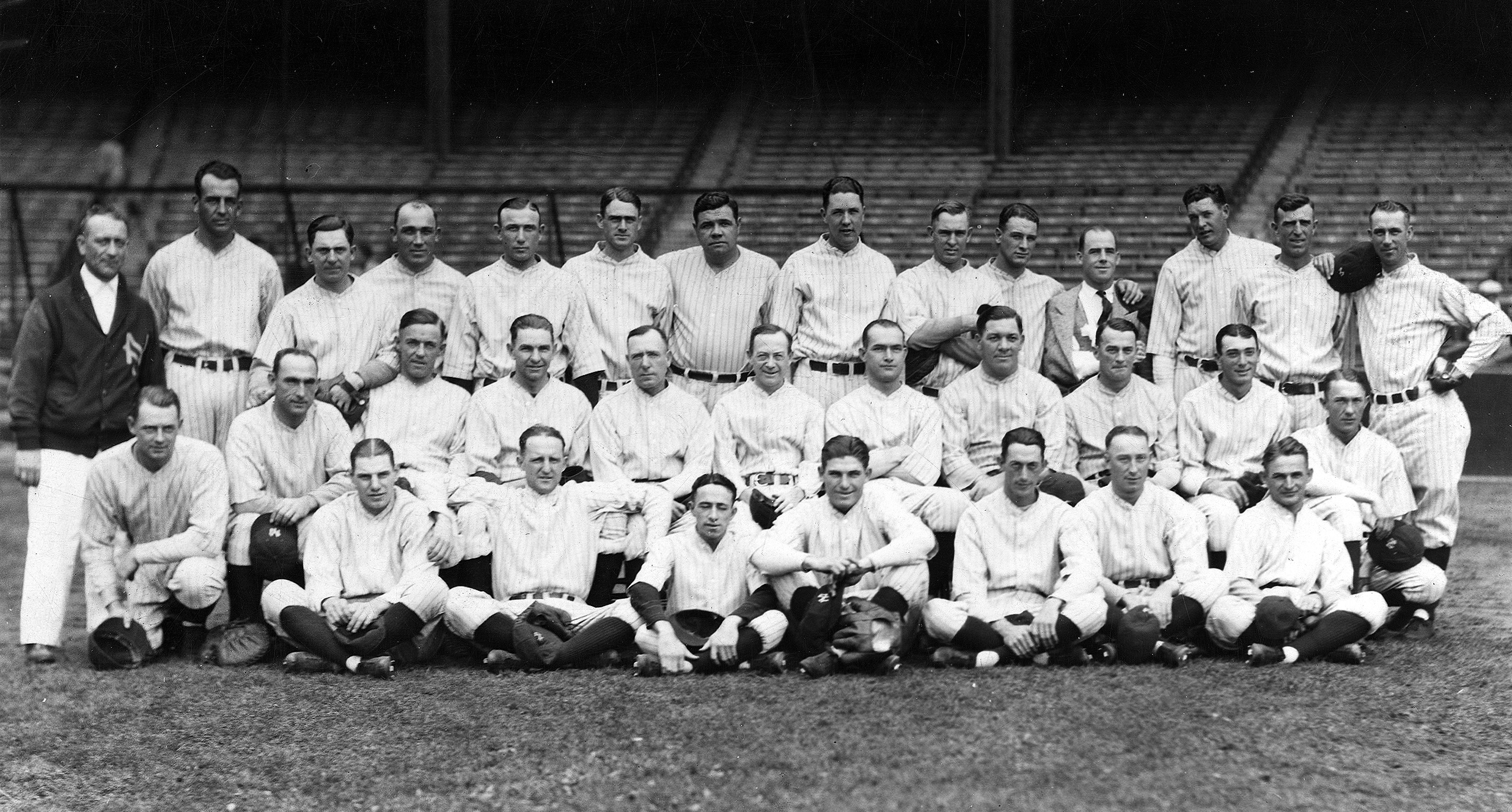
Portrait of the New York Yankees team, prior to the 1926 World Series. Paschal is in the top row, fourth from the left.

Paschal was set to enter the 1926 season as the fourth outfielder, for which he was sent a new contract. After threatening to hold out for more money, the Yankees sent him a new contract which he signed on February 17 for an estimated $7,000 (127,000 today). He began the season as a pinch hitter, but injuries quickly took their toll on the Yankees. Paschal started most of July and August, replacing an injured Meusel, who broke a bone in his right foot. Paschal hit an inside-the-park home run in a victory against the Indians on July 9. With the Yankees in a close pennant race in mid-August, Paschal hit a home run in a loss to the Detroit Tigers. Further successes came with a vital pinch-hit double in a win against the Athletics on September 6 and a home run on September 8. The Yankees clinched the pennant on September 15, and Paschal scored the game-winning single. The Yankees faced the St. Louis Cardinals in the 1926 World Series, and Paschal, pinch hitting for Joe Dugan, singled in Lou Gehrig tying the contest at 2–2 in the ninth inning of Game 5. Tony Lazzeri hit a sacrifice fly in the tenth to win the game for the Yankees, but they lost the next two games and the Series. He had played in 96 games, hitting 7 home runs with 32 runs batted in.

Before the 1927 season, Paschal returned his playing contract unsigned because of a salary dispute. By that time, the Yankees were forming the nucleus of what became the Murderers' Row teams of the late 1920s. He signed for an estimated $8,000 ($148,000 today), a 13% raise. In the season-opening win against the Athletics, right field starter Babe Ruth struck out twice and popped out, forcing Huggins to replace him with Paschal in the sixth inning. As the last man ever to pinch-hit for Ruth, Paschal singled. In one of his few starts of the 1927 season, Paschal was a single short of hitting for the cycle, and almost had three home runs. Replacing the injured Bob Meusel, Paschal hit two home runs, a triple that was yards shy of a home run, and a double which bounced off the right field stands during an 11–2 rout of the Indians. Paschal did not play in the Yankees' 1927 World Series victory over the Pittsburgh Pirates. Overall, he played in 50 games, primarily as a pinch hitter. After the season, Paschal was discussed as a trade for Boston Red Sox pitcher Red Ruffing, but discussions fell apart (Ruffing was later acquired in a proposed trade during the 1930 season).

Paschal was used heavily as a pinch hitter during the 1928 season. Huggins credited Paschal's timely pinch hitting as part of the Yankees' success that season. One of the few highlights of his season was his RBI pinch-hit double in the 10th inning that helped the Yankees beat the Chicago White Sox on August 4. Paschal played in 65 games that season, having a .316 batting average. He shared center field duties with Cedric Durst for an injured Earle Combs during the Yankees' win over the Cardinals in the 1928 World Series. He started the first and last games of the series on a platoon situation; Paschal faced left-handed pitchers and Durst faced right-handed pitchers.

Before the 1929 season, Paschal and Durst were mentioned in several trade rumors, and Paschal was rarely used, appearing in only 42 games as a sixth outfielder in the season. A rare start came on June 1 against the White Sox, when he scored a run. On July 2, Paschal hit a pinch-hit home run for Herb Pennock in the seventh inning of a game against the Red Sox to give the Yankees a 3–2 win. He played in 42 games in his final season in the majors, posting a .208 batting average in 81 at-bats.

During his time with the Yankees, Paschal was considered a quiet player with a colorless personality. His appearances were limited by the presence of future Hall of Famers Ruth and Combs, and star Bob Meusel in the outfield. He was part of a group including Lou Gehrig and Mark Koenig which preferred watching a film to carousing after a game; they were dubbed the team's "movie crowd".

=== Later career ===
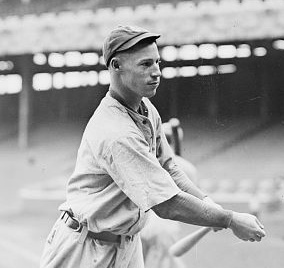
After the 1929 season, Paschal was traded for Bubbles Hargrave (pictured).

After the 1929 season, Paschal was, along with Wilcy Moore and Johnny Grabowski, part of a trade for catcher Bubbles Hargrave to the St. Paul Saints of the American Association (AA). In one 1930 game against the Toledo Mud Hens, Paschal had four hits and four RBI in a 23–4 win that broke the AA record for most runs scored in a game. In 144 games, Paschal finished the 1930 season with 204 hits, 10 home runs, and a .350 batting average. The following season, Paschal played 121 games to hit .336, while his average in 1932 was .325 in 147 games. During one game in the 1932 season, Paschal had three doubles and three singles, tying the AA record for most hits in a game. His skills declined during the 1933 season; in 130 games he hit just .272 with seven home runs. He left St. Paul and signed as a free agent with the Knoxville Smokies on December 30, 1933. The St. Petersburg Evening Independent reported a few months later that Paschal was "struggling to keep his job" in the minors. He was released by Knoxville and signed with the Scranton Miners of the New York–Penn League. After a few games with the Miners, Paschal returned home to North Carolina, where he accepted a managerial job for a semi-professional baseball team in Catawba County.

== Personal life ==
Paschal was married and had a child, Ben Jr.

He died in Charlotte, North Carolina at the age of 79, and is interred at Sharon Memorial Park.
