= Jack McCallister (baseball) =

American baseball coach, scout, and manager

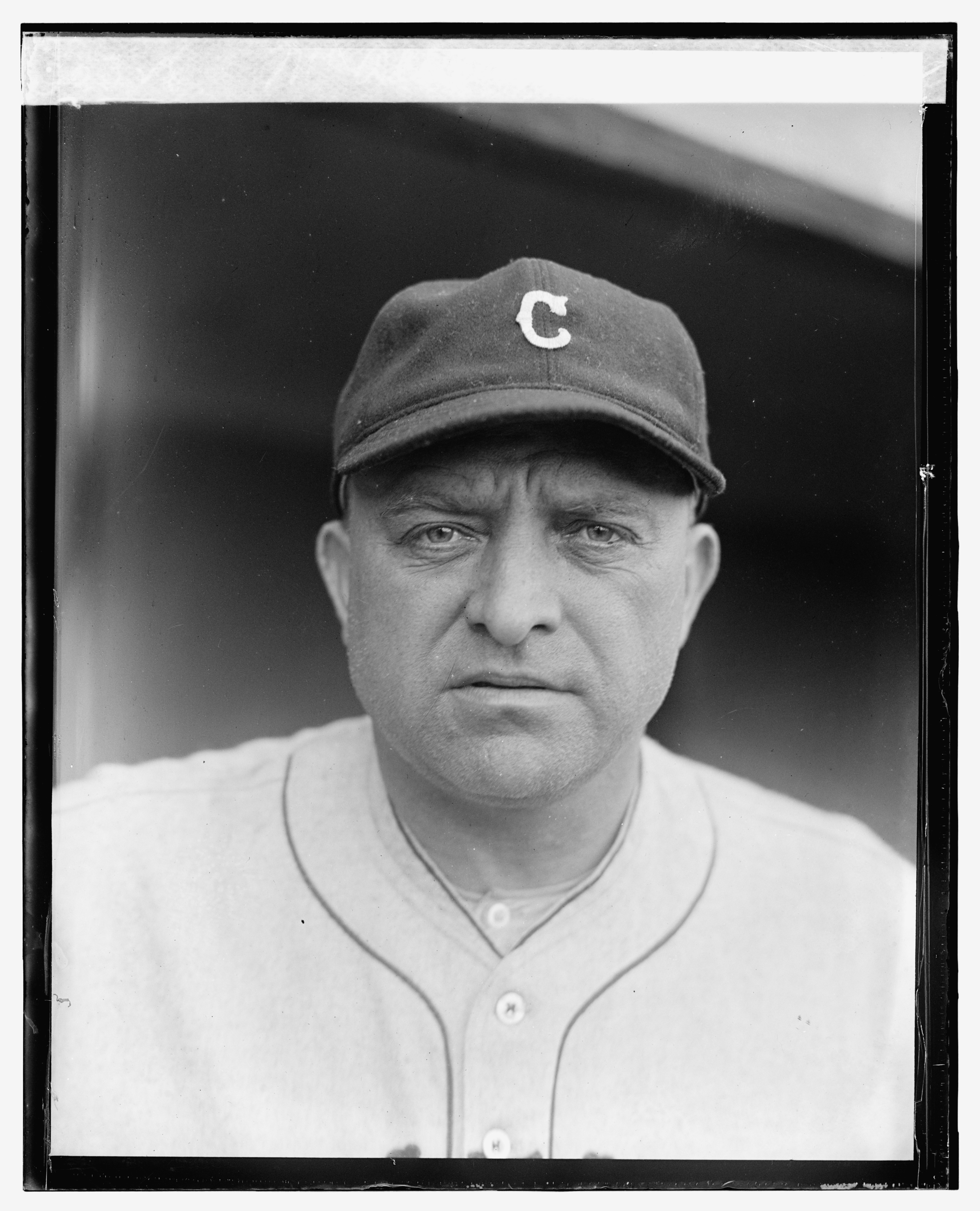
McAllister as a Cleveland Indians coach in 1924

John McCallister (January 19, 1879 – October 18, 1946) was the manager of the Cleveland Indians during the 1927 season after Tris Speaker abruptly resigned. He led the Indians to a sixth-place finish and a 66-87 record.

He began his professional career in his native Marietta, Ohio. In 1902, he was playing for the Hartford Senators in the Connecticut League, and was expected to play for the St. Louis Cardinals of the National League the following year. However, in the fall of 1902, his knee was severely injured during a benefit game in Marietta, and he was unable to play for two years.

After working as an umpire in 1905, he became a manager of the Portsmouth Cobblers of the Ohio State League in 1909. He later managed the Akron team in the Ohio–Pennsylvania and Central leagues. In 1913, the Indians hired him as a coach and scout.

McCallister was Tris Speaker's primary assistant during his years as player-manager (1919–1926). McCallister became manager after Speaker's sudden resignation in late 1926. A second-place team in 1926, the Indians entered the 1927 season with a largely unchanged roster, except that Hall of Fame center fielder Speaker now played in Washington; the team won twenty-two fewer games in 1927. When asked about the reasons for the Indians' disappointing performance, McCallister replied, "I guess it is that I just can't play centerfield." Following a change of ownership at the end of the season, McCallister's contract was not renewed. After spending the 1928 season as a coach and scout for the Detroit Tigers, he worked as a scout for the Boston Red Sox (1929–33), the Cincinnati Reds (1934), and the Boston Braves (1936–46).

McCallister died in Columbus, Ohio.
