= Wally Shaner =

American baseball player (1900–1992)

- Outfielder
- Born: May 24, 1900; Lynchburg, Virginia, U.S.
- Died: November 13, 1992 (aged 92); Las Vegas, Nevada, U.S.
- Batted: Right Threw: Right

MLB debut
- May 4, 1923, for the Cleveland Indians

Last MLB appearance
- June 14, 1929, for the Cincinnati Reds

MLB statistics
- Batting average: .278
- Home runs: 4
- Runs batted in: 74
- Stats at Baseball Reference

Teams
- Cleveland Indians (1923); Boston Red Sox (1926–1927); Cincinnati Reds (1929)

Walter Dedaker Shaner (May 24, 1900 – November 13, 1992) was an American reserve outfielder in Major League Baseball, playing mainly at left field for three different teams between the 1923 and 1929 seasons. Listed at 6 ft 2 in (1.88 m), 195 lb., Shaner batted and threw right-handed. He attended VPI, now known as Virginia Tech.

A native of Lynchburg, Virginia, Shaner spent 13 years in baseball (1920–1932), including parts of four major league seasons with the Cleveland Indians (1923), Boston Red Sox (1926–1927) and Cincinnati Reds (1929). His most productive season came in 1927 for the Red Sox, when he had a .273 batting average in a career-high 122 games.

In a four-season career, Shaner was a .278 hitter (175-for-629) with four home runs and 74 RBI in 207 games, including 80 runs, 45 doubles, eight triples, 13 stolen bases, and a .327 on-base percentage. In 170 fielding appearances, he posted a collective .965 percentage (16 errors in 455 chances). While playing for the 1925 Lincoln Links of the Western League, Shaner finished fourth in the batting race with a .358 average in 122 games, while collecting 230 hits, 85 RBI, 145 runs and 85 extrabases. His 30 triples in that season tied him for second place in minor league history and fifth place in all Organized Baseball.

Following his baseball retirement, Shaner worked as a stage manager at the Stardust Hotel in Las Vegas, Nevada. He was also a World War II veteran. Shaner died at the age of 92 in Las Vegas.
