= Frank Stewart (1920s pitcher) =

American baseball player (1906–2001)

- Pitcher
- Born: September 8, 1906; Minneapolis, Minnesota, U.S.
- Died: April 30, 2001 (aged 94); Stillwater, Minnesota, U.S.
- Batted: Right Threw: Right

MLB debut
- October 2, 1927, for the Chicago White Sox

Last MLB appearance
- October 2, 1927, for the Chicago White Sox

MLB statistics
- Games pitched: 1
- Earned run average: 9.00
- Innings pitched: 4.0
- Stats at Baseball Reference

Teams
- Chicago White Sox (1927)

Frank "Stewy" Stewart (September 8, 1906 – April 30, 2001) was an American Major League Baseball pitcher who played in one game for the Chicago White Sox on October 2, 1927. He pitched in 4.0 innings, allowing four earned runs and four base on balls.
