= Hal McKain =

American baseball player (1906–1970)

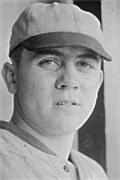
- Pitcher
- Born: June 10, 1906; Logan, Iowa, U.S.
- Died: January 24, 1970 (aged 63); Sacramento, California, U.S.
- Batted: Left Threw: Right

MLB debut
- September 22, 1923, for the Cleveland Indians

Last MLB appearance
- May 30, 1932, for the Chicago White Sox

MLB statistics
- Win–loss record: 18–23
- Earned run average: 4.93
- Strikeouts: 136
- Stats at Baseball Reference

Teams
- As player: Cleveland Indians (1927); Chicago White Sox (1929–1932)

Harold Le Roy McKain (July 10, 1906 – January 24, 1970) was an American professional baseball pitcher who played in Major League Baseball for five seasons. He played for the Cleveland Indians in 1927 and the Chicago White Sox from 1929 to 1932. After being a pitcher, McKain served as a retail sales manager in Sacramento, California. McKain died on January 24, 1970 of a sudden heart attack at the age of 63. McKain is interred in Council Bluffs, Iowa.
