= George Gerken =

American baseball player (1903–1977)

- Outfielder
- Born: July 28, 1903; Chicago, Illinois, U.S.
- Died: October 23, 1977 (aged 74); Arcadia, California, U.S.
- Batted: Right Threw: Right

MLB debut
- April 19, 1927, for the Cleveland Indians

Last MLB appearance
- September 30, 1928, for the Cleveland Indians

MLB statistics
- Batting average: .225
- Home runs: 0
- Runs batted in: 11
- Stats at Baseball Reference

Teams
- Cleveland Indians (1927–1928)

George Herbert Gerken (July 28, 1903 – October 23, 1977), nicknamed "Pickels", was an American Major League Baseball outfielder who played for two seasons. He played for the Cleveland Indians for six games in 1927 and 38 games in 1928.
