= Joe Mellana =

American baseball player (1905-1969)

- Third baseman
- Born: March 11, 1905; Oakland, California
- Died: November 1, 1969 (aged 64); Larkspur, California
- Batted: Right Threw: Right

MLB debut
- September 21, 1927, for the Philadelphia Athletics

Last MLB appearance
- October 1, 1927, for the Philadelphia Athletics

MLB statistics
- Batting average: .286
- Home runs: 0
- Runs batted in: 2
- Stats at Baseball Reference

Teams
- Philadelphia Athletics (1927)

Joseph Peter Mellana (March 11, 1905 – November 1, 1969) was an American Major League Baseball infielder. He played for the Philadelphia Athletics during the 1927 season.
