= Pee-Wee Wanninger =

American baseball player (1902–1981)

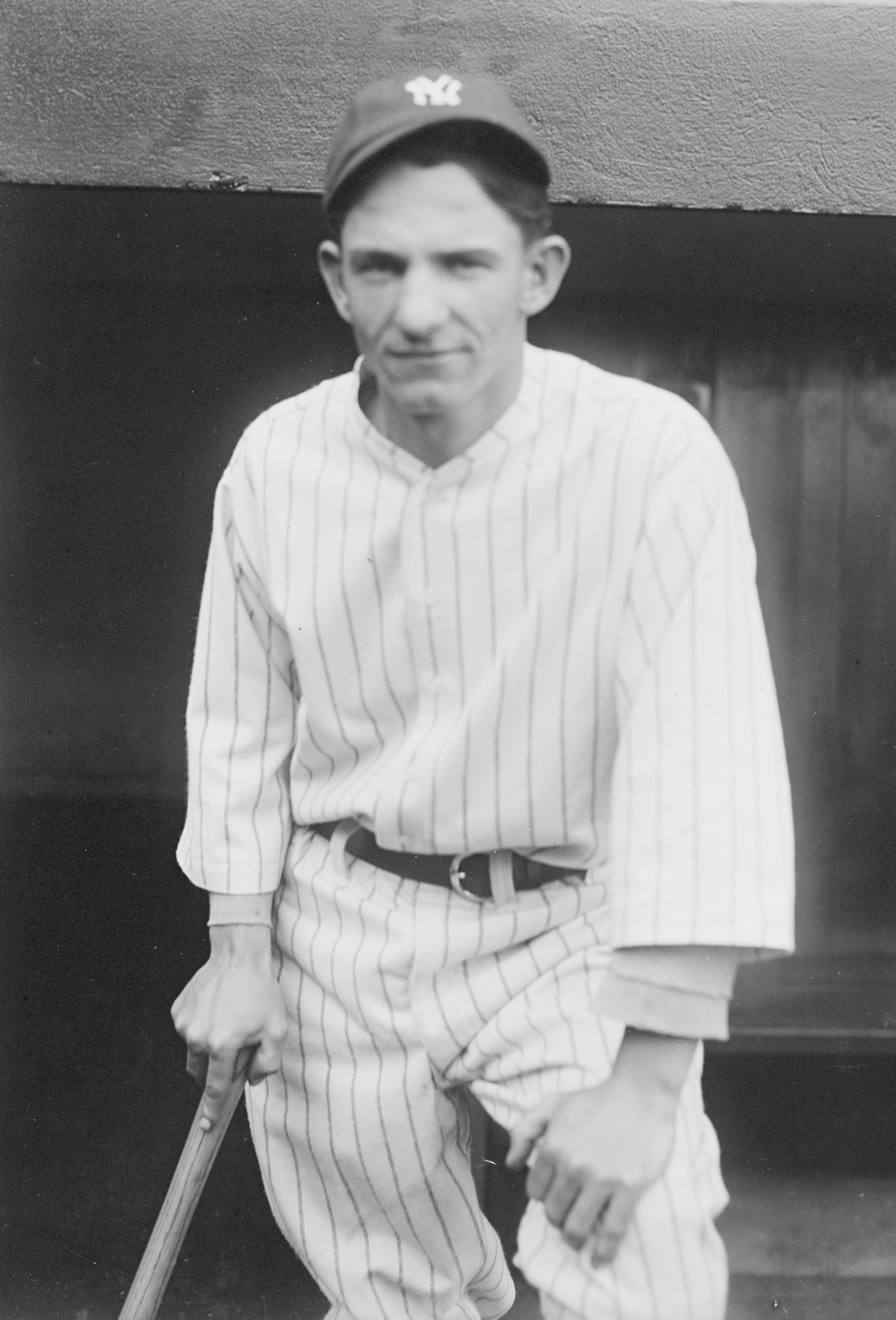
- Shortstop
- Born: December 12, 1902; Birmingham, Alabama, U.S.
- Died: March 7, 1981 (aged 78); North Augusta, South Carolina, U.S.
- Batted: Left Threw: Right

MLB debut
- April 22, 1925, for the New York Yankees

Last MLB appearance
- June 27, 1927, for the Cincinnati Reds

MLB statistics
- Batting average: .234
- Home runs: 1
- Runs batted in: 31
- Stats at Baseball Reference

Teams
- New York Yankees (1925); Boston Red Sox (1927); Cincinnati Reds (1927)

Paul Louis Wanninger (December 12, 1902 – March 7, 1981) was an American backup shortstop in Major League Baseball who played in 1925 and 1927 for the New York Yankees (1925), Boston Red Sox (1927) and Cincinnati Reds (1927). Listed at 5 ft 7 in (1.70 m), 150 lb., he batted left-handed and threw right-handed.

A native of Birmingham, Alabama, Wanninger is best known as the player who ended one consecutive-game streak and helped start another. As a rookie, he replaced Everett Scott at shortstop for the Yankees on May 5, 1925, to end Scott's then major league record of 1,307 consecutive games. On June 1, 1925 Lou Gehrig started his famous 2,130 game consecutive streak when he pinch hit for Wanninger. For the season, Wanninger had a .247 average in a career-high 117 games.

Wanninger returned to the minor leagues for all of 1926. He was on the 1927 Red Sox Opening Day lineup and was obtained by Cincinnati in midseason. In a two-season career, Wanninger was a .234 hitter (130-for-556) with one home run and 31 RBI in 163 games, including 53 runs, 15 doubles, eight triples and five stolen bases.

He died at the age of 78 in North Augusta, South Carolina.

== See also ==
- 1925 events in baseball
- 1927 Boston Red Sox season
