= Neal Baker =

American baseball player (1904-1982)

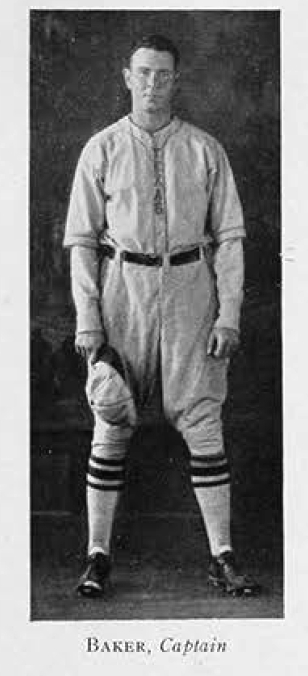
- Pitcher
- Born: April 30, 1904; La Porte, Texas
- Died: January 5, 1982 (aged 77); Houston, Texas
- Batted: Right Threw: Right

MLB debut
- April 30, 1927, for the Philadelphia Athletics

Last MLB appearance
- July 26, 1927, for the Philadelphia Athletics

MLB statistics
- Win–loss record: 0–0
- Earned run average: 5.71
- Strikeouts: 3
- Stats at Baseball Reference

Teams
- Philadelphia Athletics (1927)

Neal Vernon Baker (April 30, 1904 – January 5, 1982) was an American Major League Baseball pitcher. He played for the Philadelphia Athletics during the 1927 season.

Baker attended the University of Texas where he played baseball, was drafted into the Majors but only spent one year there, before spending the rest of his playing career in the minor leagues. He played in the Minors until 1936.
