= Ike Powers =

American baseball player (1906–1968)

- Pitcher
- Born: August 13, 1906; Hancock, Maryland
- Died: December 22, 1968 (aged 62); Hancock, Maryland
- Batted: Right Threw: Right

MLB debut
- July 26, 1927, for the Philadelphia Athletics

Last MLB appearance
- September 3, 1928, for the Philadelphia Athletics

MLB statistics
- Pitching record: 2-1
- Strikeouts: 7
- Earned run average: 4.50
- Stats at Baseball Reference

Teams
- Philadelphia Athletics 1927 – 1928

John "Ike" Lloyd Powers (March 13, 1906 – December 22, 1968) was an American professional baseball player who played two seasons for the Philadelphia Athletics during 1927 and 1928, appearing in twenty games as a pitcher, all but one of those appearances being in relief. He was born in Hancock, Maryland and died there at the age of 62.
