= Carroll Yerkes =

American baseball player (1903–1950)

- Pitcher
- Born: June 13, 1903; McSherrystown, Pennsylvania, U.S.
- Died: December 20, 1950 (aged 47); Oakland, California, U.S.
- Batted: Right Threw: Left

MLB debut
- May 31, 1927, for the Philadelphia Athletics

Last MLB appearance
- April 25, 1933, for the Chicago Cubs

MLB statistics
- Win–loss record: 1–1
- Earned run average: 3.88
- Strikeouts: 16
- Stats at Baseball Reference

Teams
- Philadelphia Athletics (1927–29); Chicago Cubs (1932–33)

Charles Carroll Yerkes (June 13, 1903 – December 20, 1950) was an American professional baseball pitcher. Over the course of five seasons in Major League Baseball, he played for the Philadelphia Athletics (1927–29) and Chicago Cubs (1932–33).
