= Elmer Eggert =

American baseball player

Mose Eggert
- Pinch hitter / Second baseman
- Born: January 29, 1902; Rochester, New York, U.S.
- Died: April 9, 1971 (aged 69); Rochester, New York, U.S.
- Batted: Right Threw: Right

MLB debut
- April 7, 1927, for the Boston Red Sox

Last MLB appearance
- October 1, 1927, for the Boston Red Sox

MLB statistics
- Batting average: .000
- Home runs: 0
- Runs batted in: 0
- Stats at Baseball Reference

Teams
- Boston Red Sox (1927)

Elmer Albert Eggert [Mose] (January 29, 1902 – April 9, 1971) was an American second baseman in Major League Baseball who played briefly for the Boston Red Sox during the 1927 season. Listed at 5 ft 9 in (1.75 m), 160 lb., he batted and threw right-handed.

Eggert was hitless in three at-bats with one strikeout and a walk in five games. As a fielder, he appeared in one game and did not have a chance.

Eggert was born to German immigrants and died in his hometown of Rochester, New York at age 69. He was also a World War II veteran in the Air Corps. He played high school baseball for East High. Eggert is buried at Mt. Hope Cemetery in Rochester, NY, which is also the burial site of Frederick Douglas and Susan B. Anthony

== Pro career ==
Eggert made his pro debut for the Dover Dobbins of the Eastern Shore League. Though stats from that era are roughly incomplete, available states credit Eggert for hitting ten home runs and finishing the season with a .305 batting average. Eggert played two seasons for Dover under the guidance of manager Jiggs Donahue, himself a career minor-leaguer. In 1927, and the Dover Dobbins franchise folded, Eegert found himself on the roster of the Boston Red Sox. He had appeared in a handful of games and would not get a hit in five at-bats.

Elmer Eggert spend the rest of his career in the minors, essentially shuffling between teams in the Western League and the Texas League. After splitting time with the Oklahoma City Indians and Tulsa Oilers in 1933, Eggert retired from pro baseball.

== See also ==
- Boston Red Sox all-time roster
