= Dud Branom =

American baseball player (1897-1980)

Edgar Dudley Branom
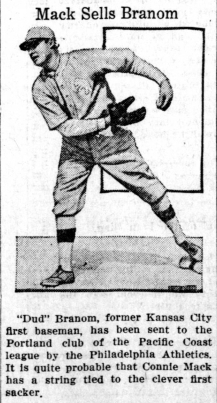

Philadelphia Athletics
- First baseman
- Born: November 30, 1897; Sulphur Springs, Texas, U.S.
- Died: February 4, 1980 (aged 82); Sun City, Arizona, U.S.
- Batted: Left Threw: Left

MLB debut
- April 12, 1927, for the Philadelphia Athletics

Last MLB appearance
- May 31, 1927, for the Philadelphia Athletics

MLB statistics (through 1927)
- Batting average: .234
- Hits: 22
- Runs batted in: 13
- Stats at Baseball Reference

Teams
- Philadelphia Athletics (1927)

Edgar Dudley Branom (November 30, 1897 – February 4, 1980) was an American Major League Baseball (MLB) infielder. He played for the Philadelphia Athletics during the 1927 season. Branom played only 30 MLB games, but he spent 15 seasons in minor league baseball and had a minor league batting average over .310. Branom owned the Enid Harvesters, a minor league team in the Western Association, in 1922. As a player, he had his best professional season that year, hitting .391.

== Biography ==
Branom was born in Sulphur Springs, Texas. He entered professional baseball in 1920, splitting that season between the Enid Harvesters of the Western Association and the Kansas City Blues of the American Association. The next year he spent 80 games with the Tulsa Oilers of the Western League, but he spent most of his time between 1920 and 1925 with Enid or Kansas City. In 1922, Branom purchased the Enid team and owned it for one season. He had a standout season for the team that year, hitting for a .391 batting average and slugging 14 home runs, earning a promotion to Kansas City for eight games that season.

After several seasons with the Blues, Branom was traded to the Philadelphia Athletics in November 1926; the Blues received Bill Wambsganss and $50,000 in return. In 1927, his only major league season, Branom hit only .234 in 30 games played for the Athletics. During that season, his contract was purchased by the Portland Beavers of the Pacific Coast League. He played 102 games for Portland that year. For the next five years, Branom played for the Louisville Colonels of the American Association, hitting between 14 and 17 home runs each season and batting over .300 four times.

Branom bounced around after that, playing for six minor league teams during the 1933 and 1934 seasons before ending his professional baseball career. Though offensive statistics are missing for two seasons, Baseball-Reference.com credits Branom with a .311 batting average and 129 home runs during his minor league career. He was a sheriff in Oklahoma after his baseball career.
