= Dutch Ussat =

American baseball player (1904–1959)

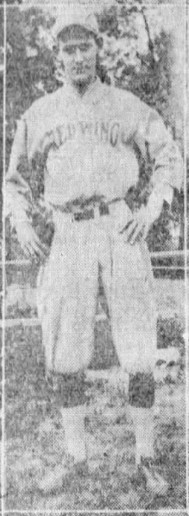
- Infielder
- Born: April 11, 1904; Dayton, Ohio, U.S.
- Died: May 29, 1959 (aged 55); Dayton, Ohio, U.S.
- Batted: Right Threw: Right

MLB debut
- September 13, 1925, for the Cleveland Indians

Last MLB appearance
- October 2, 1927, for the Cleveland Indians

MLB statistics
- Batting average: .176
- Hits: 3
- Stats at Baseball Reference

Teams
- Cleveland Indians (1925, 1927)

William August "Dutch" Ussat (April 11, 1904 – May 29, 1959) was an American Major League Baseball infielder who played for two seasons. He played one game for the Cleveland Indians during the 1925 Cleveland Indians season and four games during the 1927 Cleveland Indians season.
