= Joe Brown (pitcher) =

American baseball pitcher (1900–1950)

- Pitcher
- Born: July 3, 1900; Little Rock, Arkansas, U.S.
- Died: March 7, 1950 (aged 49); Los Angeles, California, U.S.
- Batted: Right Threw: Right

MLB debut
- May 17, 1927, for the Chicago White Sox

Last MLB appearance
- May 17, 1927, for the Chicago White Sox

MLB statistics
- Win–loss record: 0–0
- Earned run average: infinite
- Strikeouts: 0
- Stats at Baseball Reference

Teams
- Chicago White Sox (1927)

Joseph Henry Brown (July 3, 1900 – March 7, 1950) was an American Major League Baseball pitcher who played in one game for the Chicago White Sox on May 17, 1927. He faced 3 batters, gave up two hits, one base on balls, and three earned runs. Brown played in the Minor leagues from 1924 to 1930.
