= Jim Marquis =

American baseball player (1900-1992)

- Pitcher
- Born: November 18, 1900; Yoakum, Texas, U.S.
- Died: August 5, 1992 (aged 91); Jackson, California, U.S.
- Batted: Right Threw: Right

MLB debut
- August 8, 1925, for the New York Yankees

Last MLB appearance
- August 11, 1925, for the New York Yankees

MLB statistics
- Win–loss record: 0–0
- Games pitched: 2
- Earned run average: 9.82
- Stats at Baseball Reference

Teams
- New York Yankees (1925)

James Milburn Marquis (November 18, 1900 – August 5, 1992) was an American Major League Baseball pitcher. Marquis played for the New York Yankees during the 1925 season. In two games, he had a 0–0 record with a 9.82 ERA. He batted and threw right-handed. He was born in Yoakum, Texas and died in Jackson, California.
