= John Freeman (baseball) =

American baseball player (1901–1958)

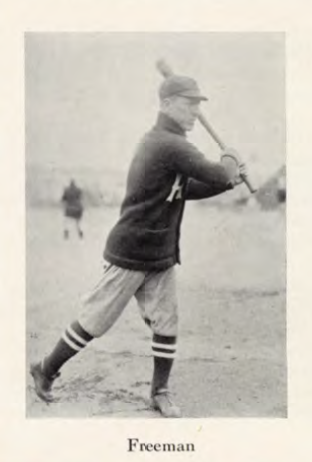
1926 yearbook photo

John Edward Freeman (January 24, 1901 – April 14, 1958) was an American baseball player.

Freeman was a reserve outfielder in Major League Baseball who played briefly for the Boston Red Sox during the 1927 season. Listed at 5 ft 8 in (1.73 m), 160 lb., Freeman batted and threw right-handed. A native of Boston, Massachusetts, he was signed out of the College of the Holy Cross.

Freeman went hitless in two at-bats in four games. As a defensive replacement, he played three games at center field (2) and left field (1) and did not have a fielding chance.

Freeman died in Washington, D.C., at age 57.

== Sources ==
- Career statistics from Baseball Reference · Baseball Reference (Minors) · Retrosheet · Baseball Almanac, or Retrosheet, or SABR Biography Project
