= Carl Sumner =

American baseball player (1908–1999)

- Outfielder
- Born: September 28, 1908; Cambridge, Massachusetts, U.S.
- Died: February 8, 1999 (aged 90); Chatham, Massachusetts, U.S.
- Batted: Left Threw: Left

MLB debut
- July 28, 1928, for the Boston Red Sox

Last MLB appearance
- August 21, 1928, for the Boston Red Sox

MLB statistics
- Batting average: .276
- Fielding percentage: .923
- Games played: 16
- Stats at Baseball Reference

Teams
- Boston Red Sox (1928)

Career highlights and awards
- 1928 Youngest Player in AL at 19 Yrs 5 Mos

Carl Ringdahl Sumner (September 28, 1908 – February 8, 1999) was an American Major League Baseball player. 'Lefty' was born in Cambridge, Massachusetts, and lived in the state until his death in Chatham, Massachusetts.

Sumner played for the Boston Red Sox for 16 games in the 1928 season when the club finished last in the American League.
