= George Loepp =

American baseball player (1901–1967)

- Center fielder
- Born: September 11, 1901; Detroit, Michigan, U.S.
- Died: September 4, 1967 (aged 65); Los Angeles, California, U.S.
- Batted: Right Threw: Right

MLB debut
- August 29, 1928, for the Boston Red Sox

Last MLB appearance
- July 23, 1930, for the Washington Senators

MLB statistics
- Batting average: .249
- Home runs: 0
- Runs batted in: 17
- Stats at Baseball Reference

Teams
- Boston Red Sox (1928); Washington Senators (1930)

George Herbert Loepp (September 11, 1901 – September 4, 1967) was an outfielder in Major League Baseball, playing mainly as a center fielder from 1928 to 1930 for the Boston Red Sox (1928) and Washington Senators (1930). Listed at 5 ft 11 in (1.80 m), 170 lb., Loepp batted and threw right-handed. He was born in Detroit, Michigan.

In a two-season career, Loepp was a .249 hitter (46-for-185) with 29 runs and 17 RBI in 65 games, including 10 doubles, two triples, and a .347 on-base percentage. He did not hit any home runs. As an outfielder, he committed six errors in 135 chances for a collective .956 fielding percentage.

Loepp died in Los Angeles at age 65.
