= Willie Underhill =

American baseball player (1904–1970)

- Pitcher
- Born: September 6, 1904; Yowell, Texas, U.S.
- Died: October 26, 1970 (aged 66); Bay City, Texas, U.S.
- Batted: Right Threw: Right

MLB debut
- September 8, 1927, for the Cleveland Indians

Last MLB appearance
- September 27, 1928, for the Cleveland Indians

MLB statistics
- Win–loss record: 1–4
- Earned run average: 5.70
- Strikeouts: 20
- Stats at Baseball Reference

Teams
- Cleveland Indians (1919–1920)

Willie Vern Underhill (September 6, 1904 – October 26, 1970) was an American Major League Baseball pitcher who played for two seasons. He pitched in four games for the Cleveland Indians in 1927 and 11 games in 1928.

In 15 games pitched including 4 starts, Underhill posted a 1-4 won loss record in 36.1 innings pitched with a 5.70 earned run average and 20 strikeouts.
