= Bob Asbjornson =

American baseball player (1909–1970)

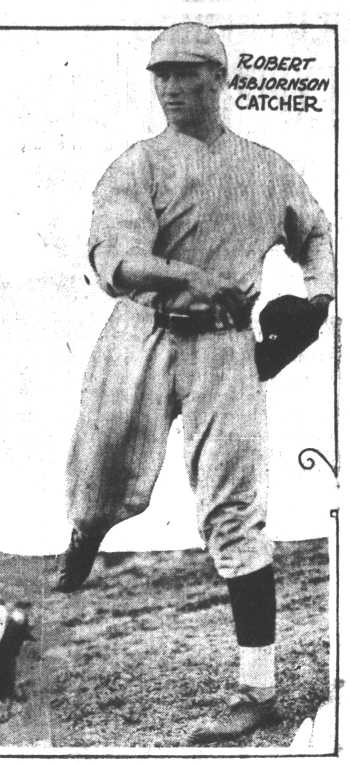
- Catcher
- Born: June 19, 1909; Concord, Massachusetts, U.S.
- Died: January 21, 1970 (aged 60); South Williamsport, Pennsylvania, U.S.
- Batted: Right Threw: Right

MLB debut
- September 17, 1928, for the Boston Red Sox

Last MLB appearance
- August 31, 1932, for the Cincinnati Reds

MLB statistics
- Batting average: .235
- Home runs: 1
- Runs batted in: 27
- Stats at Baseball Reference

Teams
- Boston Red Sox (1928–1929); Cincinnati Reds (1931–1932)

Robert Anthony Asbjornson (June 19, 1909 – January 21, 1970) was an American catcher in Major League Baseball who played for the Boston Red Sox (1928–1929) and Cincinnati Reds (1931–1932). Asbjornson batted and threw right-handed. He was born in Concord, Massachusetts.

== Career ==
Asbjornson was 19 years old when he debuted with the Boston Red Sox in 1928, being one of seven catchers used by the Red Sox in an unsuccessful attempt to replace retired Grover Hartley. His contract was purchased from the Sox by the Reading Keystones in 1930.

Later, he saw more action with the Cincinnati Reds as a backup for Clyde Sukeforth and Ernie Lombardi in part of two seasons. His best year was 1931, when he posted career-highs in batting average (.305), runs batted in (22) and games played (45).

In a four-season career, Asbjornson was a .235 hitter with one home run and 27 RBI in 97 games.

== Death ==
Asbjornson died in Williamsport, Pennsylvania, at the age of 60, on January 21, 1970.
