= Arlie Tarbert =

American baseball player (1904–1946)

- Outfielder
- Born: September 10, 1904; Cleveland, Ohio
- Died: November 27, 1946 (aged 42); Cleveland, Ohio
- Batted: Right Threw: Right

MLB debut
- June 18, 1927, for the Boston Red Sox

Last MLB appearance
- May 1, 1928, for the Boston Red Sox

MLB statistics
- Batting average: .186
- Home runs: 0
- Runs batted in: 7
- Stats at Baseball Reference

Teams
- Boston Red Sox (1927–1928)

Wilbur Arlington Tarbert (September 10, 1904 – November 27, 1946) was a reserve outfielder in Major League Baseball who played from 1927 through 1928 for the Boston Red Sox. Listed at 6' 0", 160 lb., Tarbert batted and threw right-handed. A native of Cleveland, Ohio, he attended Ohio State University.

In a 39-game career, Tarbert was a .186 hitter (16-for-86) with six runs, seven RBI, two doubles, and one stolen base with no home runs.

Tarbert died at the age of 42 in his hometown of Cleveland, Ohio.
