= Carl Lind (baseball) =

American baseball player (1903–1946)

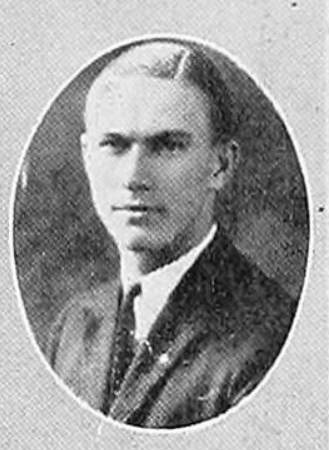
- Second baseman
- Born: September 19, 1903; New Orleans, Louisiana, U.S.
- Died: August 2, 1946 (aged 42); New York, New York, U.S.
- Batted: Right Threw: Right

MLB debut
- September 14, 1927, for the Cleveland Indians

Last MLB appearance
- June 28, 1930, for the Cleveland Indians

MLB statistics
- Batting average: .272
- Home runs: 1
- Runs batted in: 74
- Stats at Baseball Reference

Teams
- Cleveland Indians (1927–1930)

Henry Carl Lind (September 19, 1903 – August 2, 1946) was an American professional baseball second baseman. He played in Major League Baseball (MLB) from 1927 through 1930 for the Cleveland Indians.

In a four season career, Lind posted a .272 batting average with one home run and 74 RBI in 256 games, including 52 doubles, one triple, 131 runs, and nine stolen bases.

His most productive season came in 1928, when he led the American League in at bats (659) and posted career numbers in average (.294), RBI (54) and doubles (42), ending 15th in MVP voting.

Lind died in New York City, New York, of Metastatic Lymphosarcoma of the stomach, at the age of 42.
