= Frank Bushey =

American baseball player (1906–1972)

- Pitcher
- Born: August 1, 1906; Wheaton, Kansas, U.S.
- Died: March 18, 1972 (aged 65); Topeka, Kansas, U.S.
- Batted: Right Threw: Right

MLB debut
- September 17, 1927, for the Boston Red Sox

Last MLB appearance
- September 27, 1930, for the Boston Red Sox

MLB statistics
- Win–loss record: 0–1
- Earned run average: 6.32
- Strikeouts: 4
- Stats at Baseball Reference

Teams
- Boston Red Sox (1927, 1930)

Francis Clyde Bushey (August 1, 1906 – March 18, 1972) was an American pitcher who played for the Boston Red Sox (1927, 1930). Bushey batted and threw right-handed. He was born in Wheaton, Kansas.

Over parts of two seasons, Bushey posted a won-loss record of 0–1 with four strikeouts and a 6.32 ERA in 31 1/3 innings pitched.

Bushey died in Topeka, Kansas, at the age of 65.

== See also ==
- Boston Red Sox all-time roster
