= Frank Bennett (baseball) =

American baseball player (1904–1966)

- Pitcher
- Born: October 27, 1904; Mardela Springs, Maryland, U.S.
- Died: March 18, 1966 (aged 61); Wilmington, Delaware, U.S.
- Batted: Left Threw: Left

MLB debut
- September 17, 1927, for the Boston Red Sox

Last MLB appearance
- April 11, 1928, for the Boston Red Sox

MLB statistics
- Win–loss record: 0–1
- Earned run average: 2.70
- Strikeouts: 1
- Stats at Baseball Reference

Teams
- Boston Red Sox (1927–1928)

Francis Allen Bennett (October 27, 1904 – March 18, 1966), nicknamed "Chip", was an American pitcher in Major League Baseball who played for the Boston Red Sox. Listed at 5' 10.5", 163 lb., he batted and threw right-handed.

A native of Mardela Springs, Maryland, Bennett reached the majors in 1927 with the Red Sox, spending part of two seasons with them. In five appearances, he posted a 0–1 record with a 2.70 ERA, including one start, one strikeout, six walks, and 13 1/3 innings pitched.

Bennett died in Wilmington, Delaware, at the age of 61.

== See also ==
- Boston Red Sox all-time roster
