= Fred Hofmann =

American baseball player (1894–1964)

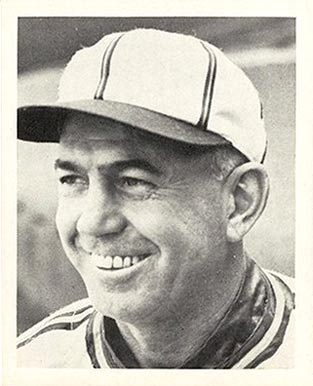
- Hofmann as a coach for the St. Louis Browns
- Catcher
- Born: June 10, 1894; St. Louis, Missouri, U.S.
- Died: November 19, 1964 (aged 70); St. Helena, California, U.S.
- Batted: Right Threw: Right

MLB debut
- September 26, 1919, for the New York Yankees

Last MLB appearance
- September 27, 1928, for the Boston Red Sox

MLB statistics
- Batting average: .247
- Home runs: 7
- Runs batted in: 93
- Stats at Baseball Reference

Teams
- New York Yankees (1919–1925); Boston Red Sox (1927–1928)

Career highlights and awards
- World Series champion (1923)

Fred Hofmann (June 10, 1894 – November 19, 1964), nicknamed "Bootnose", was an American professional baseball player, coach, scout and manager. From 1919 to 1928, he played as a catcher in Major League Baseball for the New York Yankees and the Boston Red Sox. Listed at 5 feet 11.5 inches (1.816 m), 175 pounds (79 kg), Hofmann batted and threw right-handed.

== Professional baseball career ==
Hofmann was born in St. Louis, Missouri where he began his baseball career as a grade school catcher. In the minor leagues, he not only served as a catcher, but also as a manager. He started at a professional level with the Cedar Rapids Kernels of the Central Association in 1915, then he served in the U.S. Navy during World War I from 1918 through 1919.

Following his service discharge, Hofmann entered the majors in 1919 with the New York Yankees, sharing duties with Muddy Ruel and Wally Schang. He was a member of the Yankees teams who won the American League pennants from 1921 to 1923, but only was used twice as a pinch-hitter in the 1923 World Series won by the Yankees over the NY Giants in six games. His most productive seasons for New York came in 1922 (.297 in 37 games) and in 1923, when he appeared in 72 games while hitting .290 with career-highs in runs (24), RBI (26), hits (69) and extra-bases (17). He also was one of three Yankee players selected to the Major League All-Star Team who made a tour of Japan in 1922.

During the 1925 midseason, Hofmann was sent by the Yankees to the St. Paul Saints of the American Association in the same transaction that brought Mark Koenig to New York. Hofmann last saw major league action with the Boston Red Sox, hitting .272 in a career-high 87 games in 1927, and .226 in 78 games in 1928.

== Career statistics ==
In a nine-season major league career, Hofmann was a .247 hitter (247-for-1000) with seven home runs and 93 RBI in 378 games, including 98 runs, 49 doubles, 11 triples, six stolen bases, and a .308 on-base percentage. In 340 catching appearances, he committed just 42 errors in 1363 chances for a .969 fielding percentage.

== Post-playing career ==
Following his playing career, Hofmann managed in the minor leagues for the Mission Reds (PCL, 1932–33), Memphis Chicks (SA, 1935–36 [start]), Union City Greyhounds (1936 [end]) and Columbus Red Birds (AA, 1937), winning two pennants with Union City and Columbus. After that, he coached for the St. Louis Browns for over a decade (1938–49), remaining with them as a scout (1950–53) and later when the team moved to Baltimore as the Orioles in 1954. Two of his top finds for the Orioles were All-Star slugger Boog Powell and pitcher Wally Bunker, who won 19 games during his rookie season. He also was in large measure responsible for the signing of third baseman Brooks Robinson, a future Hall of Famer.

Hofmann suffered a heart attack on November 19, 1964. He died that day at a sanitarium in St. Helena, California, age 70.
