= Herb Bradley =

American baseball player (1903–1959)

- Pitcher
- Born: January 3, 1903; Agenda, Kansas, U.S.
- Died: October 16, 1959 (aged 56); Clay Center, Kansas, U.S.
- Batted: Right Threw: Right

MLB debut
- May 9, 1927, for the Boston Red Sox

Last MLB appearance
- July 15, 1929, for the Boston Red Sox

MLB statistics
- Win–loss record: 1–4
- Earned run average: 5.93
- Strikeouts: 20
- Stats at Baseball Reference

Teams
- Boston Red Sox (1927–1929)

Herbert Theodore Bradley (January 3, 1903 – October 16, 1959) was an American right-handed pitcher in Major League Baseball who played from 1927 through 1929 for the Boston Red Sox.

Over parts of three seasons at the major league level, Bradley posted a 1–4 record with 20 strikeouts and a 5.93 ERA in 74.1 innings of work, including one shutout and three complete games. He would go on to pitch in the minor leagues at the A and B levels through 1935.
