= Pat Simmons (baseball) =

American baseball player (1908–1968)

- Pitcher
- Born: November 29, 1908; Watervliet, New York, U.S.
- Died: July 3, 1968 (aged 59); Albany, New York, U.S.
- Batted: Right Threw: Right

MLB debut
- April 18, 1928, for the Boston Red Sox

Last MLB appearance
- October 6, 1929, for the Boston Red Sox

MLB statistics
- Win–loss record: 0–2
- Strikeouts: 18
- Earned run average: 3.67
- Stats at Baseball Reference

Teams
- Boston Red Sox (1928–1929)

Patrick Clement Simmons [birth name: Patrick Clement Simoni] (November 29, 1908 – July 3, 1968) was an American relief pitcher in Major League Baseball who played briefly for the Boston Red Sox during the 1928 and 1929 seasons. Listed at 5 ft 11 in (1.80 m), 172 lb., Simmons batted and threw right-handed. He was born in Watervliet, New York.

In a two-season career, Simmons posted a 0–2 record with 18 strikeouts and a 3.67 ERA in 33 appearances, including three starts, 75 hits allowed, two saves, and 76.0 innings of work.

Simmons died in Albany, New York, at the age of 59.
