= 1931 Chicago White Sox season =

1931 Chicago White Sox
- League: American League
- Ballpark: Comiskey Park
- City: Chicago, Illinois
- Owners: Charles Comiskey
- General manager: Harry Grabiner
- Managers: Donie Bush
- Radio: WCFL (Johnny O'Hara); WGN (Bob Elson); WMAQ (Hal Totten); WIBO; WBBM; WENR; WJJD; WLS

The 1931 Chicago White Sox season was the team's 31st season in the major leagues, and its 32nd season overall. They finished with a record of 56–97, good enough for eighth place in the American League, 51.5 games behind the first place Philadelphia Athletics.

== Regular season ==
=== Season standings ===
American League
Team	W	L	Pct.	GB	Home	Road
Philadelphia Athletics	107	45	.704	—	60‍–‍15	47‍–‍30
New York Yankees	94	59	.614	13½	51‍–‍25	43‍–‍34
Washington Senators	92	62	.597	16	55‍–‍22	37‍–‍40
Cleveland Indians	78	76	.506	30	45‍–‍31	33‍–‍45
St. Louis Browns	63	91	.409	45	39‍–‍38	24‍–‍53
Boston Red Sox	62	90	.408	45	39‍–‍40	23‍–‍50
Detroit Tigers	61	93	.396	47	36‍–‍41	25‍–‍52
Chicago White Sox	56	97	.366	51½	31‍–‍45	25‍–‍52

=== Record vs. opponents ===
1931 American League record Sources:
Team	BOS	CWS	CLE	DET	NYY	PHA	SLB	WSH
Boston	—	12–10–1	13–9	12–10	6–16	4–16	8–14	7–15
Chicago	10–12–1	—	7–15–1	11–11	6–15	3–19	12–10	7–15
Cleveland	9–13	15–7–1	—	13–9	13–9	4–18	16–6	8–14
Detroit	10–12	11–11	9–13	—	8–14	4–18	11–11	8–14
New York	16–6	15–6	9–13	14–8	—	11–11	16–6	13–9–1
Philadelphia	16–4	19–3	18–4	18–4	11–11	—	14–8	11–11–1
St. Louis	14–8	10–12	6–16	11–11	6–16	8–14	—	8–14
Washington	15–7	15–7	14–8	14–8	9–13–1	11–11–1	14–8	—

=== Roster ===
1931 Chicago White Sox
Roster
Pitchers: 19 Grant Bowler; 19 Garland Braxton; 16 Pat Caraway; 18 Red Faber; 24 Vic Frazier; 25 Lou Garland; 14 Ted Lyons; 17 Hal McKain; 23 Jim Moore; 15 Tommy Thomas; 25 Biggs Wehde; 2 Bob Weiland	Catchers: -- Hank Garrity; 9 Frank Grube; 12 Butch Henline; 8 Bennie Tate; Infielders: 5 Luke Appling; 27 Lu Blue; 1 Bill Cissell; 28 Irv Jeffries; 7 Willie Kamm; 29 John Kerr; 26 Billy Sullivan	Outfielders: -- Bruce Campbell; 34 Ike Eichrodt; 7 Lew Fonseca; 35 Bob Fothergill; 4 Smead Jolley; 34 Bill Norman; 3 Carl Reynolds; 2 Mel Simons; 6 Johnny Watwood	Manager: Donie Bush; Coaches: Mike Kelly

== Player stats ==
=== Batting ===
==== Starters by position ====
Note: Pos = Position; G = Games played; AB = At bats; H = Hits; Avg. = Batting average; HR = Home runs; RBI = Runs batted in

Pos	Player	G	AB	H	Avg.	HR	RBI
C	Bennie Tate	89	273	73	.267	0	22
1B	Lu Blue	155	589	179	.304	1	62
2B	John Kerr	128	444	119	.268	2	50
SS	Bill Cissell	109	409	90	.220	1	46
3B	Billy Sullivan	92	363	100	.275	2	33
OF	Johnny Watwood	128	367	104	.283	1	47
OF	Lew Fonseca	121	465	139	.299	2	71
OF	Carl Reynolds	118	462	134	.290	6	77

==== Other batters ====
Note: G = Games played; AB = At bats; H = Hits; Avg. = Batting average; HR = Home runs; RBI = Runs batted in

Player	G	AB	H	Avg.	HR	RBI
Bob Fothergill	108	312	88	.282	3	56
Luke Appling	96	297	69	.232	1	28
Frank Grube	88	265	58	.219	1	24
Irv Jeffries	79	223	50	.224	2	16
Mel Simons	68	189	52	.275	0	12
Ike Eichrodt	34	117	25	.214	0	15
Smead Jolley	54	110	33	.300	3	28
Willie Kamm	18	59	15	.254	0	9
Bill Norman	24	55	10	.182	0	6
Bruce Campbell	4	17	7	.412	2	5
Butch Henline	11	15	1	.067	0	2
Hank Garrity	8	14	3	.214	0	2

=== Pitching ===
==== Starting pitchers ====
Note: G = Games pitched; IP = Innings pitched; W = Wins; L = Losses; ERA = Earned run average; SO = Strikeouts

Player	G	IP	W	L	ERA	SO
Vic Frazier	46	254.0	13	15	4.46	87
Tommy Thomas	43	245.1	10	14	4.73	72

==== Other pitchers ====
Note: G = Games pitched; IP = Innings pitched; W = Wins; L = Losses; ERA = Earned run average; SO = Strikeouts

Player	G	IP	W	L	ERA	SO
Pat Caraway	51	220.0	10	24	6.22	55
Red Faber	44	184.0	10	14	3.82	49
Hal McKain	27	112.0	6	9	5.71	39
Ted Lyons	22	101.0	4	6	4.01	16
Bob Weiland	15	75.0	2	7	5.16	38
Grant Bowler	13	35.1	0	1	5.35	15
Lou Garland	7	16.2	0	2	10.26	4

==== Relief pitchers ====
Note: G = Games pitched; W = Wins; L = Losses; SV = Saves; ERA = Earned run average; SO = Strikeouts

Player	G	W	L	SV	ERA	SO
Jim Moore	33	0	2	0	4.95	15
Garland Braxton	17	0	3	1	6.85	28
Biggs Wehde	8	1	0	0	6.75	3
