= 1931 Boston Red Sox season =

Major League Baseball season

1931 Boston Red Sox
- League: American League
- Ballpark: Fenway Park
- City: Boston, Massachusetts
- Record: 62–90 (.408)
- League place: 6th
- Owners: J. A. Robert Quinn
- Managers: Shano Collins
- Radio: WNAC (Fred Hoey)
- Stats: ESPN.com; Baseball Reference

The 1931 Boston Red Sox season was the 31st season in the franchise's Major League Baseball history. The team's home field was Fenway Park. The Red Sox finished sixth in the American League (AL) with a record of 62 wins and 90 losses, 45 games behind the Philadelphia Athletics.

The Red Sox played their Sunday home games at Braves Field this season, as had been the case since the team's 1929 season, due to Fenway being close to a house of worship. The team played a total of 15 home games at Braves Field during the 1931 season, all on Sundays.

This was the first season that the Red Sox wore uniform numbers.

Outfielder Earl Webb set the single-season mark of 67 doubles which is still a major league record to this day.

== Regular season ==
=== Season standings ===
American League
Team	W	L	Pct.	GB	Home	Road
Philadelphia Athletics	107	45	.704	—	60‍–‍15	47‍–‍30
New York Yankees	94	59	.614	13½	51‍–‍25	43‍–‍34
Washington Senators	92	62	.597	16	55‍–‍22	37‍–‍40
Cleveland Indians	78	76	.506	30	45‍–‍31	33‍–‍45
St. Louis Browns	63	91	.409	45	39‍–‍38	24‍–‍53
Boston Red Sox	62	90	.408	45	39‍–‍40	23‍–‍50
Detroit Tigers	61	93	.396	47	36‍–‍41	25‍–‍52
Chicago White Sox	56	97	.366	51½	31‍–‍45	25‍–‍52

=== Record vs. opponents ===
1931 American League record Sources:
Team	BOS	CWS	CLE	DET	NYY	PHA	SLB	WSH
Boston	—	12–10–1	13–9	12–10	6–16	4–16	8–14	7–15
Chicago	10–12–1	—	7–15–1	11–11	6–15	3–19	12–10	7–15
Cleveland	9–13	15–7–1	—	13–9	13–9	4–18	16–6	8–14
Detroit	10–12	11–11	9–13	—	8–14	4–18	11–11	8–14
New York	16–6	15–6	9–13	14–8	—	11–11	16–6	13–9–1
Philadelphia	16–4	19–3	18–4	18–4	11–11	—	14–8	11–11–1
St. Louis	14–8	10–12	6–16	11–11	6–16	8–14	—	8–14
Washington	15–7	15–7	14–8	14–8	9–13–1	11–11–1	14–8	—

=== Opening Day lineup ===
4	Rabbit Warstler	SS
12	Russ Scarritt	LF
1	Bill Sweeney	1B
15	Earl Webb	RF
3	Jack Rothrock	3B
2	Bobby Reeves	2B
14	Tom Oliver	CF
9	Charlie Berry	C
31	Wilcy Moore	P

=== Roster ===
1931 Boston Red Sox
Roster
Pitchers: 27 Jim Brillheart; 25 Ed Durham; 19 Milt Gaston; 28 Bob Kline; 24 Hod Lisenbee; 21 Danny MacFayden; 30 Jud McLaughlin; 31 Wilcy Moore; 23 Ed Morris; 29 Walter Murphy; 22 Jack Russell	Catchers: 9 Charlie Berry; 11 Ed Connolly; 10 Muddy Ruel; 16 Howie Storie; Infielders: 8 Pat Creeden; 7 Ollie Marquardt; 28 Marty McManus; 5 Otto Miller; 10 Marv Olson; 34 Urbane Pickering; 2 Bobby Reeves; 6 Hal Rhyne; 9 John Smith; 1 Bill Sweeney; 4 Rabbit Warstler	Outfielders: 16 Johnny Lucas; 14 Tom Oliver; 3 Jack Rothrock; 16 Gene Rye; 12 Russ Scarritt; 23 George Stumpf; 17 Al Van Camp; 15 Earl Webb; 12 Tom Winsett; Other batters: 7 Bill Marshall; 27 Bill McWilliams	Manager: 32 Shano Collins; Coaches: -- Hugh Duffy; 33 Rudy Hulswitt

This was the first season that the Red Sox wore uniform numbers.

== Player stats ==
=== Batting ===
==== Starters by position ====
Note: Pos = Position; G = Games played; AB = At bats; H = Hits; Avg. = Batting average; HR = Home runs; RBI = Runs batted in

Pos	Player	G	AB	H	Avg.	HR	RBI
C	Charlie Berry	111	357	101	.283	6	49
1B	Bill Sweeney	131	498	147	.295	1	58
2B	Rabbit Warstler	66	181	44	.243	0	10
SS	Hal Rhyne	147	565	154	.273	0	51
3B	Otis L. Miller	107	389	106	.272	0	43
OF	Jack Rothrock	133	475	132	.278	4	42
OF	Tom Oliver	148	586	162	.276	0	70
OF	Earl Webb	151	589	196	.333	14	103

==== Other batters ====
Note: G = Games played; AB = At bats; H = Hits; Avg. = Batting average; HR = Home runs; RBI = Runs batted in

Player	G	AB	H	Avg.	HR	RBI
Urbane Pickering	103	341	86	.252	9	52
Al Van Camp	101	324	89	.275	0	33
Ed Connolly	42	93	7	.075	0	3
Bobby Reeves	36	84	14	.167	0	1
Muddy Ruel	33	83	25	.301	0	6
Tom Winsett	64	76	15	.197	1	7
Marty McManus	17	62	18	.290	1	9
Marv Olson	15	53	10	.189	0	5
Ollie Marquardt	17	39	7	.179	0	2
Gene Rye	17	39	7	.179	0	1
Russ Scarritt	10	39	6	.154	0	1
George Stumpf	7	28	7	.250	0	4
Howie Storie	6	17	2	.118	0	0
John Smith	4	15	2	.133	0	1
Johnny Lucas	3	2	0	.000	0	0
Bill McWilliams	2	2	0	.000	0	0
Bill Marshall	1	0	0	----	0	0

=== Pitching ===
==== Starting pitchers ====
Note: G = Games pitched; IP = Innings pitched; W = Wins; L = Losses; ERA = Earned run average; SO = Strikeouts

Player	G	IP	W	L	ERA	SO
Jack Russell	36	232.0	10	18	5.16	45
Danny MacFayden	35	230.2	16	12	4.02	74
Milt Gaston	23	119.0	2	13	4.46	33

==== Other pitchers ====
Note: G = Games pitched; IP = Innings pitched; W = Wins; L = Losses; ERA = Earned run average; SO = Strikeouts

Player	G	IP	W	L	ERA	SO
Wilcy Moore	53	185.1	11	13	3.88	37
Ed Durham	38	165.1	8	10	4.25	53
Hod Lisenbee	41	164.2	5	12	5.19	42
Ed Morris	37	130.2	5	7	4.75	46
Bob Kline	28	98.0	5	5	4.41	25

==== Relief pitchers ====
Note: G = Games pitched; W = Wins; L = Losses; SV = Saves; ERA = Earned run average; SO = Strikeouts

Player	G	W	L	SV	ERA	SO
Jim Brillheart	11	0	0	0	5.49	7
Jud McLaughlin	9	0	0	0	12.00	3
Walter Murphy	2	0	0	0	9.00	0
Bobby Reeves	1	0	0	0	3.68	0
