= 1931 Philadelphia Athletics season =

1931 Philadelphia Athletics
- American League champions
- League: American League
- Ballpark: Shibe Park
- City: Philadelphia
- Record: 107–45 (.704)
- League place: 1st
- Owners: Connie Mack, Tom Shibe and John Shibe
- Managers: Connie Mack

The 1931 Philadelphia Athletics season involved the A's finishing first in the American League with a record of 107 wins and 45 losses. It was the team's third consecutive pennant-winning season and its third consecutive season with over 100 wins. However the A's lost the 1931 World Series to the St. Louis Cardinals in seven games. The series loss prevented the Athletics from becoming the first major league baseball team to win three consecutive World Series; the New York Yankees would accomplish the feat seven years later. The Athletics, ironically, would go on to earn their own threepeat in 1974, some forty-three years after the failed 1931 attempt.

1931 was also the A's final World Series appearance in Philadelphia. Their next AL pennant would be in 1972, after they had moved to Oakland.

== Offseason ==
- November 29, 1930: Homer Summa and Ossie Orwoll were traded by the Athletics to the Portland Beavers for Herb Lahti (minors).
- December 10, 1930: Cy Perkins was purchased from the Athletics by the New York Yankees.

== Regular season ==
1931 was the greatest season of Lefty Grove's career. He went 31–4, with a 2.06 ERA and 175 strikeouts, easily winning the pitching triple crown. He was voted league Most Valuable Player. Combined with the efforts of 21- and 20-game winners George Earnshaw and Rube Walberg, Philadelphia allowed the fewest runs of any AL team.

Slugger Al Simmons won the batting title with a .390 average and came in third in MVP voting.

=== Season standings ===
American League
Team	W	L	Pct.	GB	Home	Road
Philadelphia Athletics	107	45	.704	—	60‍–‍15	47‍–‍30
New York Yankees	94	59	.614	13½	51‍–‍25	43‍–‍34
Washington Senators	92	62	.597	16	55‍–‍22	37‍–‍40
Cleveland Indians	78	76	.506	30	45‍–‍31	33‍–‍45
St. Louis Browns	63	91	.409	45	39‍–‍38	24‍–‍53
Boston Red Sox	62	90	.408	45	39‍–‍40	23‍–‍50
Detroit Tigers	61	93	.396	47	36‍–‍41	25‍–‍52
Chicago White Sox	56	97	.366	51½	31‍–‍45	25‍–‍52

=== Record vs. opponents ===
1931 American League record Sources:
Team	BOS	CWS	CLE	DET	NYY	PHA	SLB	WSH
Boston	—	12–10–1	13–9	12–10	6–16	4–16	8–14	7–15
Chicago	10–12–1	—	7–15–1	11–11	6–15	3–19	12–10	7–15
Cleveland	9–13	15–7–1	—	13–9	13–9	4–18	16–6	8–14
Detroit	10–12	11–11	9–13	—	8–14	4–18	11–11	8–14
New York	16–6	15–6	9–13	14–8	—	11–11	16–6	13–9–1
Philadelphia	16–4	19–3	18–4	18–4	11–11	—	14–8	11–11–1
St. Louis	14–8	10–12	6–16	11–11	6–16	8–14	—	8–14
Washington	15–7	15–7	14–8	14–8	9–13–1	11–11–1	14–8	—

=== Roster ===
1931 Philadelphia Athletics
Roster
Pitchers: 19 Sol Carter; 11 George Earnshaw; 10 Lefty Grove; 28 Waite Hoyt; 18 Lew Krausse; 15 Roy Mahaffey; 16 Hank McDonald; 17 Jim Peterson; 14 Eddie Rommel; 13 Bill Shores; 12 Rube Walberg	Catchers: 2 Mickey Cochrane; 20 Johnnie Heving; 21 Joe Palmisano; Infielders: 4 Max Bishop; 6 Joe Boley; 5 Jimmy Dykes; 3 Jimmie Foxx; 22 Eric McNair; 24 Phil Todt; 23 Dib Williams	Outfielders: 26 Doc Cramer; 44 Lou Finney; 8 Mule Haas; 9 Bing Miller; 25 Jimmy Moore; 7 Al Simmons	Manager: Connie Mack; Coaches: Eddie Collins; Kid Gleason; Earle Mack

== Player stats ==
= Indicates team leader

=== Batting ===
==== Starters by position ====
Note: Pos = Position; G = Games played; AB = At bats; H = Hits; Avg. = Batting average; HR = Home runs; RBI = Runs batted in

Pos	Player	G	AB	H	Avg.	HR	RBI
C	Mickey Cochrane	122	459	160	.349	17	89
1B	Jimmie Foxx	139	515	150	.291	30	120
2B	Max Bishop	130	497	146	.294	5	37
3B	Jimmy Dykes	101	355	97	.273	3	46
SS	Dib Williams	86	294	79	.269	6	40
LF	Al Simmons	128	513	200	.390	22	128
CF	Mule Haas	102	440	142	.323	8	56
RF	Bing Miller	137	534	150	.281	8	77

==== Other batters ====
Note: G = Games played; AB = At bats; H = Hits; Avg. = Batting average; HR = Home runs; RBI = Runs batted in

Player	G	AB	H	Avg.	HR	RBI
Eric McNair	79	280	76	.271	5	33
Joe Boley	67	224	51	.228	0	20
Doc Cramer	65	223	58	.260	2	20
Phil Todt	62	197	48	.244	5	44
Jimmy Moore	49	143	32	.224	2	21
Johnnie Heving	42	113	27	.239	1	12
Joe Palmisano	19	44	10	.227	0	4
Lou Finney	9	24	9	.375	0	3

=== Pitching ===
==== Starting pitchers ====
Note: G = Games pitched; IP = Innings pitched; W = Wins; L = Losses; ERA = Earned run average; SO = Strikeouts

Player	G	IP	W	L	ERA	SO
Rube Walberg	44	291.0	20	12	3.74	106
Lefty Grove	41	288.2	31	4	2.06	175
George Earnshaw	43	281.2	21	7	3.67	152
Roy Mahaffey	30	162.1	15	4	4.21	59
Waite Hoyt	16	111.0	10	5	4.22	30

Note: George Earnshaw was team leader in saves with 6.

==== Other pitchers ====
Note: G = Games pitched; IP = Innings pitched; W = Wins; L = Losses; ERA = Earned run average; SO = Strikeouts

Player	G	IP	W	L	ERA	SO
Eddie Rommel	25	118.0	7	5	2.97	18
Hank McDonald	19	70.1	2	4	3.71	23
Bill Shores	6	16.0	0	3	5.06	2
Jim Peterson	6	13.0	0	1	6.23	7
Lew Krausse	3	11.0	1	0	4.09	1

==== Relief pitchers ====
Note: G = Games pitched; W = Wins; L = Losses; SV = Saves; ERA = Earned run average; SO = Strikeouts

Player	G	W	L	SV	ERA	SO
Sol Carter	2	0	0	0	19.29	1

== Awards and honors ==
=== League top five finishers ===
Mickey Cochrane

- #4 in AL in batting average (.349)

George Earnshaw

- #2 in AL in strikeouts (152)
- #3 in AL in wins (21)

Jimmie Foxx

- #4 in AL in home runs (30)

Lefty Grove

- AL leader in wins (31)
- AL leader in ERA (2.06) (Grove's 2.06 ERA was 2.32 runs below the league average.)
- AL leader in strikeouts (175)

Al Simmons

- AL leader in batting average (.390)
- #3 in AL in slugging percentage (.641)
- #4 in AL in RBI (128)
- #4 in AL in on-base percentage (.444)

== 1931 World Series ==
NL St. Louis Cardinals (4) vs. AL Philadelphia Athletics (3)

Game	Score	Date	Location	Attendance
1	Athletics – 6, Cardinals – 2	October 1	Sportsman's Park	38,529
2	Athletics – 0, Cardinals – 2	October 2	Sportsman's Park	35,947
3	Cardinals – 5, Athletics – 2	October 5	Shibe Park	32,295
4	Cardinals – 0, Athletics – 3	October 6	Shibe Park	32,295
5	Cardinals – 5, Athletics – 1	October 7	Shibe Park	32,295
6	Athletics – 8, Cardinals – 1	October 9	Sportsman's Park	39,401
7	Athletics – 2, Cardinals – 4	October 10	Sportsman's Park	20,805

== Farm system ==
Level	Team	League	Manager
AA	Portland Beavers	Pacific Coast League	Spencer Abbott
B	Harrisburg Senators	New York–Pennsylvania League	Joe Cobb and Eddie Onslow

LEAGUE CHAMPIONS: Harrisburg
