= 1931 New York Yankees season =

Season for the Major League Baseball team the New York Yankees

1931 New York Yankees
- League: American League
- Ballpark: Yankee Stadium
- City: New York City, New York
- Record: 94–59 (.614)
- League place: 2nd
- Owner: Jacob Ruppert
- General manager: Ed Barrow
- Manager: Joe McCarthy (1st season)

The 1931 New York Yankees season was the team's 29th season. The team finished with a 94–59–2 record (.614), finishing 13.5 games behind the Philadelphia Athletics. The Yankees played their home games at Yankee Stadium. This team is notable for holding the modern day Major League record for team runs scored in a season with 1,067 (6.88 runs per game average).

New York was managed by future Hall-of-Famer Joe McCarthy; 1931 was his first season with the Yankees after spending the previous five with the Chicago Cubs. The owner and general manager (Jacob Ruppert and Ed Barrow, respectively), would also eventually be indicted into the Hall-of-Fame.

For the second straight season, the Yankees fielded nine players who would eventually be enshrined in the Hall of Fame (Earle Combs, Bill Dickey, Lou Gehrig, Lefty Gomez, Tony Lazzeri, Herb Pennock, Red Ruffing, Babe Ruth, and Joe Sewell). This is the most all time, tied with the previous year's team as well as the 1932 and 1933 Yankees teams. The same nine Hall of Famers played for the 1931, 1932, and 1933 teams, with the 1930 team differing only by not having Joe Sewell and instead featuring Waite Hoyt.

== Offseason ==
- December 10, 1930: Cy Perkins was purchased by the Yankees from the Philadelphia Athletics.
- January 13, 1931: Harry Rice was selected off waivers from the Yankees by the Washington Senators.

== Regular season ==
First baseman Lou Gehrig set an American League record by driving in 185 runs, breaking his own record of 173 set in 1927. The total, which was six short of Hack Wilson's all-time record of 191 set the previous year, still stands as of the end of the 2022 season.

=== Season standings ===
American League
| Team | W | L | Pct. | GB | Home | Road |
|---|---|---|---|---|---|---|
| Philadelphia Athletics | 107 | 45 | .704 | — | 60‍–‍15 | 47‍–‍30 |
| New York Yankees | 94 | 59 | .614 | 13½ | 51‍–‍25 | 43‍–‍34 |
| Washington Senators | 92 | 62 | .597 | 16 | 55‍–‍22 | 37‍–‍40 |
| Cleveland Indians | 78 | 76 | .506 | 30 | 45‍–‍31 | 33‍–‍45 |
| St. Louis Browns | 63 | 91 | .409 | 45 | 39‍–‍38 | 24‍–‍53 |
| Boston Red Sox | 62 | 90 | .408 | 45 | 39‍–‍40 | 23‍–‍50 |
| Detroit Tigers | 61 | 93 | .396 | 47 | 36‍–‍41 | 25‍–‍52 |
| Chicago White Sox | 56 | 97 | .366 | 51½ | 31‍–‍45 | 25‍–‍52 |

=== Record vs. opponents ===
1931 American League record Sources:
| Team | BOS | CWS | CLE | DET | NYY | PHA | SLB | WSH |
|---|---|---|---|---|---|---|---|---|
| Boston | — | 12–10–1 | 13–9 | 12–10 | 6–16 | 4–16 | 8–14 | 7–15 |
| Chicago | 10–12–1 | — | 7–15–1 | 11–11 | 6–15 | 3–19 | 12–10 | 7–15 |
| Cleveland | 9–13 | 15–7–1 | — | 13–9 | 13–9 | 4–18 | 16–6 | 8–14 |
| Detroit | 10–12 | 11–11 | 9–13 | — | 8–14 | 4–18 | 11–11 | 8–14 |
| New York | 16–6 | 15–6 | 9–13 | 14–8 | — | 11–11 | 16–6 | 13–9–1 |
| Philadelphia | 16–4 | 19–3 | 18–4 | 18–4 | 11–11 | — | 14–8 | 11–11–1 |
| St. Louis | 14–8 | 10–12 | 6–16 | 11–11 | 6–16 | 8–14 | — | 8–14 |
| Washington | 15–7 | 15–7 | 14–8 | 14–8 | 9–13–1 | 11–11–1 | 14–8 | — |

=== Roster ===
1931 New York Yankees
Roster
| Pitchers: 22,34 Ivy Andrews; 20 Lefty Gomez; 14 Hank Johnson; 34 Lou McEvoy; 16 Herb Pennock; 12 George Pipgras; 19,21 Gordon Rhodes; 18 Red Ruffing; 15 Roy Sherid; 24 Jim Weaver; 19 Lefty Weinert; 17 Ed Wells | Catchers: 8 Bill Dickey; 10 Arndt Jorgens; 9 Cy Perkins; Infielders: 4 Lou Gehrig; 2 Lyn Lary; 5 Tony Lazzeri; 26 Jimmie Reese; 2 Red Rolfe; 27 Joe Sewell | Outfielders: 26 Sammy Byrd; 7 Ben Chapman; 1 Earle Combs; 6 Dusty Cooke; 28 Myril Hoag; 3 Babe Ruth; 35 Dixie Walker | Manager: -- Joe McCarthy; Coaches: 31 Jimmy Burke; 30 Art Fletcher |

== Player stats ==
=== Batting ===
==== Starters by position ====
Note: Pos = Position; G = Games played; AB = At bats; H = Hits; Avg. = Batting average; HR = Home runs; RBI = Runs batted in

| Pos | Player | G | AB | H | Avg. | HR | RBI |
|---|---|---|---|---|---|---|---|
| C | Bill Dickey | 130 | 477 | 156 | .327 | 6 | 78 |
| 1B | Lou Gehrig | 155 | 619 | 211 | .341 | 46 | 185 |
| 2B | Tony Lazzeri | 135 | 484 | 129 | .267 | 8 | 83 |
| SS | Lyn Lary | 155 | 610 | 171 | .280 | 10 | 107 |
| 3B | Joe Sewell | 130 | 484 | 146 | .302 | 6 | 64 |
| OF | Babe Ruth | 145 | 534 | 199 | .373 | 46 | 162 |
| OF | Earl Combs | 138 | 563 | 179 | .318 | 5 | 58 |
| OF | Ben Chapman | 149 | 600 | 189 | .315 | 17 | 122 |

==== Other batters ====
Note: G = Games played; AB = At bats; H = Hits; Avg. = Batting average; HR = Home runs; RBI = Runs batted in

| Player | G | AB | H | Avg. | HR | RBI |
|---|---|---|---|---|---|---|
| Samuel Byrd | 115 | 248 | 67 | .270 | 3 | 32 |
| Jimmie Reese | 65 | 245 | 59 | .241 | 3 | 26 |
| Arndt Jorgens | 46 | 100 | 27 | .270 | 0 | 14 |
| Cy Perkins | 16 | 47 | 12 | .255 | 0 | 7 |
| Dusty Cooke | 27 | 39 | 13 | .333 | 1 | 6 |
| Myril Hoag | 44 | 28 | 4 | .143 | 0 | 3 |
| Dixie Walker | 2 | 10 | 3 | .300 | 0 | 1 |
| Red Rolfe | 1 | 0 | 0 | ---- | 0 | 0 |

=== Pitching ===
==== Starting pitchers ====
Note: G = Games pitched; IP = Innings pitched; W = Wins; L = Losses; ERA = Earned run average; SO = Strikeouts

| Player | G | IP | W | L | ERA | SO |
|---|---|---|---|---|---|---|
| Lefty Gomez | 40 | 243.0 | 21 | 9 | 2.67 | 150 |
| Red Ruffing | 37 | 237.0 | 16 | 14 | 4.41 | 132 |
| Hank Johnson | 40 | 196.1 | 13 | 8 | 4.72 | 106 |
| Herb Pennock | 25 | 189.1 | 11 | 6 | 4.28 | 65 |
| Gordon Rhodes | 18 | 87.0 | 6 | 3 | 3.41 | 36 |

==== Other pitchers ====
Note: G = Games pitched; IP = Innings pitched; W = Wins; L = Losses; ERA = Earned run average; SO = Strikeouts

| Player | G | IP | W | L | ERA | SO |
|---|---|---|---|---|---|---|
| George Pipgras | 36 | 137.2 | 7 | 6 | 3.79 | 59 |
| Ed Wells | 27 | 116.2 | 9 | 5 | 4.32 | 34 |
| Roy Sherid | 17 | 74.1 | 5 | 5 | 5.69 | 39 |
| Jim Weaver | 17 | 57.2 | 2 | 1 | 5.31 | 28 |
| Ivy Andrews | 7 | 34.1 | 2 | 0 | 4.19 | 10 |

==== Relief pitchers ====
Note: G = Games pitched; W = Wins; L = Losses; SV = Saves; ERA = Earned run average; SO = Strikeouts

| Player | G | W | L | SV | ERA | SO |
|---|---|---|---|---|---|---|
| Lefty Weinert | 17 | 2 | 2 | 0 | 6.20 | 24 |
| Lou McEvoy | 6 | 0 | 0 | 1 | 12.41 | 3 |

== Awards and honors ==
=== League records ===
- Lou Gehrig, American League single season record, runs batted in (RBI) for a season (185).

== Farm system ==
| Level | Team | League | Manager |
|---|---|---|---|
| AA | Newark Bears | International League | Al Mamaux |
| A | Albany Senators | Eastern League | Bill McCorry |
| B | Scranton Miners | New York–Pennsylvania League | Buck Elliott and Ernie Vick |
| D | Cumberland Colts | Middle Atlantic League | Leo Mackey |

LEAGUE CHAMPIONS: Cumberland
