= Al Niemiec =

American baseball player (1911–1995)

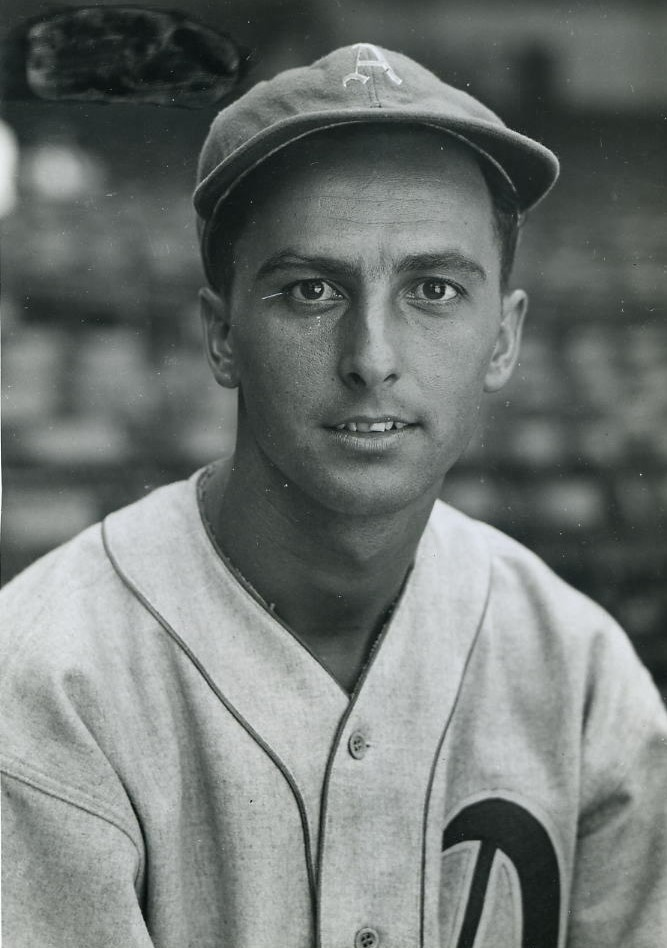
- Second baseman / Shortstop
- Born: May 18, 1911; Meriden, Connecticut, U.S.
- Died: October 29, 1995 (aged 84); Kirkland, Washington, U.S.
- Batted: Right Threw: Right

MLB debut
- September 19, 1934, for the Boston Red Sox

Last MLB appearance
- September 7, 1936, for the Philadelphia Athletics

MLB statistics
- Batting average: .200
- Hits: 47
- Home runs: 1
- Runs batted in: 23
- Stolen bases: 2
- Stats at Baseball Reference

Teams
- Boston Red Sox (1934); Philadelphia Athletics (1936)

Alfred Joseph Niemiec (May 18, 1911 – October 29, 1995) was an American baseball second baseman and shortstop who played two seasons in Major League Baseball (MLB) in 1934 and 1936, for the Boston Red Sox and the Philadelphia Athletics, respectively. He has the distinction of having been traded by the Red Sox for Ted Williams. Listed at 5' 11", 158 lb., Niemiec batted and threw right-handed. A native of Meriden, Connecticut, he attended College of the Holy Cross from 1931 to 1933. He is also famous for a precedent-setting legal case about returning veterans of World War II.

== College career ==
Niemiec attended St. Thomas Seminary and then went to the College of the Holy Cross from 1931 to 1933. He played baseball with future Major League players Hank Garrity, Joe Mulligan, Ed Moriarty, and Bob Friedrichs. In 1931, he played summer baseball for Falmouth of the Cape Cod Baseball League. The team's starting third baseman, Niemiec helped lead Falmouth to the league title.

== Minor League career ==
Following Niemiec's college career, he made his Minor League Baseball debut in 1933 for Class A Reading Red Sox, where he batted .306 and played third base for 62 games. In the following year, Niemiec moved up to the Double-A Kansas City Blues where he batted .301 and played shortstop for 128 games, and was called up by the Boston Red Sox. Niemiec got sent down at the season and played next season with the Double-A Syracuse Chiefs, where he batted .278 and played shortstop for a team high 153 games. He also hit a team high 15 triples.

After being sent down for a second time, Niemiec continued his Minor League career with the Class A-1 Little Rock Travelers of the Southern Association, where he batted .313 and played second base for 146 games. Little Rock was an affiliate of the Boston Red Sox at the time. On December 7, 1937 the Red Sox sent Niemiec and Dom Dallessandro to the San Diego Padres of the Pacific Coast League in exchange for a promising young "kid" named Ted Williams.

Niemiec would play the 1938 and 1939 seasons with Double-A San Diego. He batted .304 and played second base for 73 games in 1938, and batted .279 while playing second base for 155 games. For the next three seasons, he would play for the Double-A Seattle Rainiers of the Pacific Coast League. In 1940, he batted .274 and played second base for a team high 176 games. In 1941, he batted .297 and played second base for 156 games, leading his team to a 104–70 record and first place in the Pacific League. In the next season, Niemiec batted .266, playing 173 games at second base. After four years with the navy, Niemiec played for the now Triple-A Seattle Rainiers. He batted .211 and only played 11 games. He then was traded to the B team Providence Chiefs of the New England League, but he did not play.

== Major League career ==
Niemiec made his major league debut on September 19, 1934, for the Boston Red Sox. They lost 3–2 against the St. Louis Browns. Niemiec batted lead off and went 2–4 with an RBI. In the following game, Niemiec went 3–3 with another RBI. After that game, we went 0–3 and was moved down to the 7th spot in the batting order for one game. For the season, the Red Sox would finish 4th in the American League, posting a record of 76–76. In the 9 games Niemiec played that season, he batted 7–32 (.212).

=== Transactions ===
- January 4, 1936: Trade by the Boston Red Sox along with Hank Johnson (P) and cash to the Philadelphia Athletics in exchange for Doc Cramer (CF) and Eric McNair (SS).
- October 9, 1936: Purchased by the Baltimore Orioles of the International League from the Philadelphia Athletics.

== Military service ==
In 1942, Niemiec was called by the United States Navy to serve in World War II. He served for four years and was released in January 1946.

== Later life ==
After he was released in 1946, Niemiec filed suit, saying that his release violated the spirit of the G.I. Bill of Rights, which gave returning veterans a right to employment at their previous employer for a full year. He won the case, in spite of Major League Baseball's opposition; the precedent gave payments to hundreds of former major and minor league players who were also cut by their teams upon return from service in the war.

== Death ==
Niemiec died at the age of 84 in Kirkland, Washington. He is buried at Sunset Hills Memorial Park in Bellevue, Washington.

== See also ==
- 1934 Boston Red Sox season
- 1936 Philadelphia Athletics season
