= 1931 Detroit Tigers season =

Major League Baseball season

1931 Detroit Tigers
- League: American League
- Ballpark: Navin Field
- City: Detroit, Michigan
- Record: 61–93 (.396)
- League place: 7th
- Owners: Frank Navin
- Managers: Bucky Harris
- Radio: WWJ (AM) (Ty Tyson)

During the 1931 Detroit Tigers season, the team was one of eight in the American League of baseball in the United States. The team finished seventh in the American League with a record of 61–93, 47 games behind the Philadelphia Athletics.

== Regular season ==
=== Season standings ===
American League
Team	W	L	Pct.	GB	Home	Road
Philadelphia Athletics	107	45	.704	—	60‍–‍15	47‍–‍30
New York Yankees	94	59	.614	13½	51‍–‍25	43‍–‍34
Washington Senators	92	62	.597	16	55‍–‍22	37‍–‍40
Cleveland Indians	78	76	.506	30	45‍–‍31	33‍–‍45
St. Louis Browns	63	91	.409	45	39‍–‍38	24‍–‍53
Boston Red Sox	62	90	.408	45	39‍–‍40	23‍–‍50
Detroit Tigers	61	93	.396	47	36‍–‍41	25‍–‍52
Chicago White Sox	56	97	.366	51½	31‍–‍45	25‍–‍52

=== Record vs. opponents ===
1931 American League record Sources:
Team	BOS	CWS	CLE	DET	NYY	PHA	SLB	WSH
Boston	—	12–10–1	13–9	12–10	6–16	4–16	8–14	7–15
Chicago	10–12–1	—	7–15–1	11–11	6–15	3–19	12–10	7–15
Cleveland	9–13	15–7–1	—	13–9	13–9	4–18	16–6	8–14
Detroit	10–12	11–11	9–13	—	8–14	4–18	11–11	8–14
New York	16–6	15–6	9–13	14–8	—	11–11	16–6	13–9–1
Philadelphia	16–4	19–3	18–4	18–4	11–11	—	14–8	11–11–1
St. Louis	14–8	10–12	6–16	11–11	6–16	8–14	—	8–14
Washington	15–7	15–7	14–8	14–8	9–13–1	11–11–1	14–8	—

=== Roster ===
1931 Detroit Tigers
Roster
Pitchers: 16 Tommy Bridges; 28 Orlin Collier; 41 Art Herring; 18 Elon Hogsett; 14 Waite Hoyt; 12 Vic Sorrell; 19 Charlie Sullivan; 15 George Uhle; 11 Earl Whitehill; 17 Whit Wyatt	Catchers: -- Gene Desautels; 35 Johnny Grabowski; 9 Ray Hayworth; -- Muddy Ruel; 8 Wally Schang; Infielders: 7 Bill Akers; 4 Dale Alexander; 7 Louis Brower; 25 Joe Dugan; 3 Charlie Gehringer; 34 Bucky Harris; 27 Mark Koenig; 5 Marty McManus; 29 Marv Owen; -- Nolen Richardson; -- Billy Rogell	Outfielders: 6 Frank Doljack; 22 Roy Johnson; -- George Quellich; 26 Ivey Shiver; 24 John Stone; 2 Gee Walker; 1 Hub Walker	Manager: 34 Bucky Harris; Coaches: Roger Bresnahan; Jean Dubuc

== Player stats ==
=== Batting ===
==== Starters by position ====
Note: Pos = Position; G = Games played; AB = At bats; H = Hits; Avg. = Batting average; HR = Home runs; RBI = Runs batted in

Pos	Player	G	AB	H	Avg.	HR	RBI
C	Ray Hayworth	88	273	70	.256	0	26
1B	Dale Alexander	135	517	168	.325	3	87
2B	Charlie Gehringer	101	383	119	.311	4	53
SS	Billy Rogell	48	185	56	.303	2	24
3B	Marty McManus	107	362	98	.271	3	53
OF	Hub Walker	90	252	72	.286	0	14
OF	John Stone	147	584	191	.327	10	78
OF	Roy Johnson	151	621	173	.279	8	54

==== Other batters ====
Note: G = Games played; AB = At bats; H = Hits; Avg. = Batting average; HR = Home runs; RBI = Runs batted in

Player	G	AB	H	Avg.	HR	RBI
Marv Owen	105	377	84	.223	3	39
Mark Koenig	106	364	92	.253	1	39
Gee Walker	59	189	56	.296	1	28
Frank Doljack	63	187	52	.278	4	20
Nolen Richardson	38	148	40	.270	0	14
Johnny Grabowski	40	136	32	.235	1	13
Wally Schang	30	76	14	.184	0	3
Bill Akers	29	66	13	.197	0	3
Louis Brower	21	62	10	.161	0	7
George Quellich	13	54	12	.222	1	11
Muddy Ruel	14	50	6	.120	0	3
Joe Dugan	8	17	4	.235	0	0
Gene Desautels	3	11	1	.091	0	1
Ivey Shiver	2	9	1	.111	0	0
Bucky Harris	4	8	1	.125	0	0

=== Pitching ===
==== Starting pitchers ====
Note: G = Games pitched; IP = Innings pitched; W = Wins; L = Losses; ERA = Earned run average; SO = Strikeouts

Player	G	IP	W	L	ERA	SO
Earl Whitehill	34	271.1	13	16	4.08	81
Vic Sorrell	35	245.0	13	14	4.15	99
Waite Hoyt	16	92.0	3	8	5.87	10
Orlin Collier	2	10.1	0	1	7.84	3

==== Other pitchers ====
Note: G = Games pitched; IP = Innings pitched; W = Wins; L = Losses; ERA = Earned run average; SO = Strikeouts

Player	G	IP	W	L	ERA	SO
George Uhle	29	193.0	11	12	3.50	63
Tommy Bridges	35	173.0	8	16	4.99	105
Art Herring	35	165.0	7	13	4.31	64
Elon Hogsett	22	112.1	3	9	5.93	47
Whit Wyatt	4	20.1	0	2	8.85	8

==== Relief pitchers ====
Note: G = Games pitched; W = Wins; L = Losses; SV = Saves; ERA = Earned run average; SO = Strikeouts

Player	G	W	L	SV	ERA	SO
Charlie Sullivan	31	3	2	0	4.93	28
Mark Koenig	3	0	0	0	6.43	3

== Farm system ==
Level	Team	League	Manager
AA	Toronto Maple Leafs	International League	Steve O'Neill
A	Beaumont Exporters	Texas League	Del Baker
B	Evansville Hubs	Illinois–Indiana–Iowa League	Bob Coleman
C	Wheeling Stogies	Middle Atlantic League	Dan Tapson and Raymond Haley
