= Gene Rye =

American baseball player (1906–1980)

- Left fielder
- Born: November 15, 1906; Chicago, Illinois, U.S.
- Died: January 21, 1980 (aged 73); Park Ridge, Illinois, U.S.
- Batted: Left Threw: Right

MLB debut
- April 22, 1931, for the Boston Red Sox

Last MLB appearance
- June 6, 1931, for the Boston Red Sox

MLB statistics
- Games played: 17
- Batting average: .179
- Runs batted in: 1
- Stats at Baseball Reference

Teams
- Boston Red Sox (1931)

Eugene Rudolph Rye [Half-Pint] (November 15, 1906 – January 21, 1980) was an American left fielder in Major League Baseball who played with the Boston Red Sox during the 1931 season.

Listed at 5'6", 165 lb., Rye batted left-handed and threw right-handed.

His birth name was Eugene Rudolph Mercantelli, the son of Amedeo Menotti Mercantelli (1866-1950) and Daria "Dora" Frediani (1867-1920). He was born in Chicago, Illinois. Rye married Julia Swentko on October 28, 1950.

Used as a pinch hitter by Boston, Rye also shared duties at left field with Al Van Camp and Jack Rothrock. In a 17-game career, he posted a .179 batting average (7-for-39) with three runs and one run batted in with no extra-base hits. In 10 outfield appearances, he had 10 putouts and committed an error for a .944 fielding percentage.

Rye hit three home runs in one inning in 1930 while playing with the Waco Cubs in the Texas League. The third home run is considered one of the greatest minor league baseball home runs of all time.

When Rye was 29 years old he finished his professional baseball career after his 1936 season.

Rye died at the age of 73 in Park Ridge, Illinois.

== See also ==
- 1931 Boston Red Sox season
- Boston Red Sox all-time roster
