= Hank Garrity (baseball) =

American baseball player (1908–1962)

- Catcher
- Born: February 4, 1908; Boston, Massachusetts, U.S.
- Died: September 1, 1962 (aged 54); Boston, Massachusetts, U.S.
- Batted: Right Threw: Right

MLB debut
- July 26, 1931, for the Chicago White Sox

Last MLB appearance
- September 26, 1931, for the Chicago White Sox

MLB statistics
- Batting average: .214
- Home runs: 0
- Runs batted in: 2
- Stats at Baseball Reference

Teams
- Chicago White Sox (1931)

Francis Joseph "Hank" Garrity (February 4, 1908 – September 1, 1962) was an American professional baseball player. He played eight games in Major League Baseball for the Chicago White Sox in 1931, primarily as a catcher. Listed at 6 ft 1 in (1.85 m), 185 pounds (84 kg), he batted and threw right-handed.

== Early life ==
Garrity was from the Jamaica Plain neighborhood of Boston. In 1948, he was voted the best athlete to ever graduate from the Boston public schools. Garrity attended College of the Holy Cross.

== Baseball career ==
Garrity joined the Chicago White Sox during the 1931 season, as part of a catching tandem that included Bennie Tate, Frank Grube and Butch Henline. In an eight-game career, he posted a batting average of .214 (3-for-14), including one double and two runs batted in.

== Later life ==
After his baseball career, Garrity served in the armed forces during World War II. He died in his home town of Boston, Massachusetts, at the age of 54.
