= 1931 Washington Senators season =

1931 Washington Senators
- League: American League
- Ballpark: Griffith Stadium
- City: Washington, D.C.
- Record: 92–62 (.597)
- League place: 3rd
- Owners: Clark Griffith and William Richardson
- Managers: Walter Johnson

The 1931 Washington Senators won 92 games, lost 62, and finished in third place in the American League. They were managed by Walter Johnson and played home games at Griffith Stadium.

== Offseason ==
- January 13, 1931: Harry Rice was selected off waivers by the Senators from the New York Yankees.

== Regular season ==
=== Season standings ===
American League
Team	W	L	Pct.	GB	Home	Road
Philadelphia Athletics	107	45	.704	—	60‍–‍15	47‍–‍30
New York Yankees	94	59	.614	13½	51‍–‍25	43‍–‍34
Washington Senators	92	62	.597	16	55‍–‍22	37‍–‍40
Cleveland Indians	78	76	.506	30	45‍–‍31	33‍–‍45
St. Louis Browns	63	91	.409	45	39‍–‍38	24‍–‍53
Boston Red Sox	62	90	.408	45	39‍–‍40	23‍–‍50
Detroit Tigers	61	93	.396	47	36‍–‍41	25‍–‍52
Chicago White Sox	56	97	.366	51½	31‍–‍45	25‍–‍52

=== Record vs. opponents ===
1931 American League record Sources:
Team	BOS	CWS	CLE	DET	NYY	PHA	SLB	WSH
Boston	—	12–10–1	13–9	12–10	6–16	4–16	8–14	7–15
Chicago	10–12–1	—	7–15–1	11–11	6–15	3–19	12–10	7–15
Cleveland	9–13	15–7–1	—	13–9	13–9	4–18	16–6	8–14
Detroit	10–12	11–11	9–13	—	8–14	4–18	11–11	8–14
New York	16–6	15–6	9–13	14–8	—	11–11	16–6	13–9–1
Philadelphia	16–4	19–3	18–4	18–4	11–11	—	14–8	11–11–1
St. Louis	14–8	10–12	6–16	11–11	6–16	8–14	—	8–14
Washington	15–7	15–7	14–8	14–8	9–13–1	11–11–1	14–8	—

=== Notable transactions ===
- July 29, 1931: Harry Rice was purchased from the Senators by the Baltimore Orioles.

=== Roster ===
1931 Washington Senators
Roster
Pitchers: 17 Lloyd Brown; 19 Bobby Burke; 15 Alvin Crowder; 20 Carl Fischer; 16 Bump Hadley; 14 Sam Jones; 18 Ad Liska; 12 Firpo Marberry; 18 Walt Masters; 21 Walt Tauscher; -- Monte Weaver	Catchers: 10 Cliff Bolton; 9 Pinky Hargrave; 8 Roy Spencer; Infielders: -- Bill Andrus; 7 Ossie Bluege; 4 Joe Cronin; 22 Jackie Hayes; 27 Buck Jordan; 5 Joe Judge; 23 Joe Kuhel; 1 Buddy Myer	Outfielders: -- Johnny Gill; 26 Dave Harris; 3 Heinie Manush; 25 Harry Rice; 2 Sam Rice; 6 Sam West; Other batters: 29 Nick Altrock; -- Babe Phelps	Manager: 28 Walter Johnson; Coaches: 29 Nick Altrock; 31 Patsy Gharrity; 30 Al Schacht

== Player stats ==
=== Batting ===
==== Starters by position ====
Note: Pos = Position; G = Games played; AB = At bats; H = Hits; Avg. = Batting average; HR = Home runs; RBI = Runs batted in

Pos	Player	G	AB	H	Avg.	HR	RBI
C	Roy Spencer	145	483	133	.275	1	60
1B	Joe Kuhel	139	524	141	.269	8	85
2B	Buddy Myer	139	591	173	.293	4	56
SS	Joe Cronin	156	611	187	.306	12	126
3B	Ossie Bluege	152	570	155	.272	8	98
OF	Heinie Manush	146	616	189	.307	6	70
OF	Sam Rice	120	413	128	.310	0	42
OF	Sam West	132	526	175	.333	3	91

==== Other batters ====
Note: G = Games played; AB = At bats; H = Hits; Avg. = Batting average; HR = Home runs; RBI = Runs batted in

Player	G	AB	H	Avg.	HR	RBI
Dave Harris	77	231	72	.312	5	50
Harry Rice	47	162	43	.265	0	15
Jackie Hayes	38	108	24	.222	0	8
Pinky Hargrave	40	80	26	.325	1	19
Joe Judge	35	74	21	.284	0	9
Cliff Bolton	23	43	11	.256	0	6
Johnny Gill	8	30	8	.267	0	5
Buck Jordan	9	18	4	.222	0	1
Bill Andrus	3	7	0	.000	0	1
Babe Phelps	3	3	1	.333	0	0
Nick Altrock	1	0	0	----	0	0

=== Pitching ===
==== Starting pitchers ====
Note: G = Games pitched; IP = Innings pitched; W = Wins; L = Losses; ERA = Earned run average; SO = Strikeouts

Player	G	IP	W	L	ERA	SO
Lloyd Brown	42	258.2	15	14	3.20	79
General Crowder	44	234.1	18	11	3.88	85
Firpo Marberry	45	219.0	16	4	3.45	88
Sad Sam Jones	25	148.0	9	10	4.32	58

==== Other pitchers ====
Note: G = Games pitched; IP = Innings pitched; W = Wins; L = Losses; ERA = Earned run average; SO = Strikeouts

Player	G	IP	W	L	ERA	SO
Carl Fischer	46	191.0	13	9	4.38	96
Bump Hadley	55	179.2	11	10	3.06	124
Bobby Burke	30	128.2	8	3	4.27	38
Monte Weaver	3	10.0	1	0	4.50	6
Ad Liska	2	4.0	0	1	6.75	2

==== Relief pitchers ====
Note: G = Games pitched; W = Wins; L = Losses; SV = Saves; ERA = Earned run average; SO = Strikeouts

Player	G	W	L	SV	ERA	SO
Walt Tauscher	6	1	0	0	7.50	5
Walt Masters	3	0	0	1	2.00	1

== Farm system ==
Level	Team	League	Manager
A	Chattanooga Lookouts	Southern Association	Bert Niehoff
C	Hagerstown Hubs/Parkersburg Parkers/Youngstown Tubers	Middle Atlantic League	Joe Cambria

Hagerstown club transferred and renamed twice: to Parkersburg, June 28, and to Youngstown, July 12, 1931
