= Ollie Marquardt =

American baseball player (1902–1968)

- Second baseman
- Born: September 22, 1902; Toledo, Ohio, U.S.
- Died: February 7, 1968 (aged 65); Port Clinton, Ohio, U.S.
- Batted: Right Threw: Right

MLB debut
- April 14, 1931, for the Boston Red Sox

Last MLB appearance
- June 8, 1931, for the Boston Red Sox

MLB statistics
- Batting average: .179
- Home runs: 0
- Runs batted in: 2
- Stats at Baseball Reference

Teams
- Boston Red Sox (1931)

Albert Ludwig "Ollie" Marquardt (September 22, 1902 – February 7, 1968) was an American second baseman in Major League Baseball who played briefly for the Boston Red Sox during the 1931 season. Listed at 5 ft 9 in (1.75 m), 156 lb., Marquardt batted and threw right-handed. He was born in Toledo, Ohio.

Marquardt appeared in 17 games for the hapless 1931 Red Sox as a 28-year-old rookie. He was just one of nine second basemen tried by manager Shano Collins, in a team that finished 6th in American League with a 59–93 record. In 15 fielding appearances, Marquardt played at second base (13), shortstop (1) and third, compiling a collective .947 fielding percentage. He was a .179 hitter (7-for-39) with one double, two RBI and four runs without home runs. He later became a successful minor league manager, posting a 293–189 record for the Class-B Cedar Rapids Raiders of the Three-I League from 1939 through 1942 –including three consecutive championship titles (1940–42)–, and leading the 1944 Toledo Mud Hens to a 95–58 finish in the American Association.

Marquardt died in Port Clinton, Ohio at age 65.

== See also ==
- 1931 Boston Red Sox season
