= Joe Klinger =

American baseball player (1902–1960)

- First baseman / Catcher
- Born: August 2, 1902; Canonsburg, Pennsylvania, U.S.
- Died: July 31, 1960 (aged 57); Little Rock, Arkansas, U.S.
- Batted: Right Threw: Right

MLB debut
- September 13, 1927, for the New York Giants

Last MLB appearance
- May 13, 1930, for the Chicago White Sox

MLB statistics
- Batting average: .385
- Hits: 5
- Runs batted in: 1
- Stats at Baseball Reference

Teams
- New York Giants (1927); Chicago White Sox (1930)

Joseph John Klinger (August 2, 1902 – July 31, 1960) was an American first baseman, catcher, and left fielder who played in Major League Baseball in 1927 and 1930. Klinger played in three games for the New York Giants in 1927 and in four games for the Chicago White Sox in 1930.
