= Spike Merena =

American baseball player (1909–1977)

- Pitcher
- Born: November 18, 1909; Paterson, New Jersey
- Died: March 9, 1977 (aged 67); Bridgeport, Connecticut
- Batted: Left Threw: Left

MLB debut
- September 16, 1934, for the Boston Red Sox

Last MLB appearance
- September 30, 1934, for the Boston Red Sox

MLB statistics
- Win–loss record: 1–2
- Earned run average: 2.92
- Strikeouts: 7

Teams
- Boston Red Sox (1934)

John Joseph Merena (November 18, 1909 – March 9, 1977) was a left-handed pitcher in Major League Baseball in 1934. Merena pitched in four games for the Boston Red Sox, starting three of those games, completing two, and collecting his only win in a four-hit shutout over the rival New York Yankees. His career was over in the spring of 1935 due to a sore arm. His father, Jacob Kosmo Merena, had come from Nove Sonch (Nowy Sacz), Poland (it was Russia at the time), arriving in the United States in 1901. Jacob's wife Mary was a New York native, born to two Russian parents.
