= Johnny Gill (baseball) =

American baseball player (1905–1984)

- Outfielder
- Born: March 27, 1905; Nashville, Tennessee, U.S.
- Died: December 26, 1984 (aged 79); Nashville, Tennessee, U.S.
- Batted: Left Threw: Right

MLB debut
- August 28, 1927, for the Cleveland Indians

Last MLB appearance
- September 27, 1936, for the Chicago Cubs

MLB statistics
- Batting average: .245
- Home runs: 10
- Runs batted in: 45
- Stats at Baseball Reference

Teams
- Cleveland Indians (1927–1928); Washington Senators (1931, 1934); Chicago Cubs (1935–1936)

John Wesley Gill (March 27, 1905 – December 26, 1984) was an American Major League Baseball outfielder who played for six seasons. He played for the Cleveland Indians from 1927 to 1928, the Washington Senators in 1931 and 1934, and the Chicago Cubs from 1935 to 1936. He led the American Association with 43 home runs in 1935.

After his two seasons with the Indians, totaling 23 games in which he hit .217 with 1 home run, Gill played in 1929 for the Albany Senators of the Class A Eastern League, where he hit .373 with 14 home runs. The Indians needed a right-handed hitting outfielder and were interested in bringing Gill back in 1930, but rookie Bob Seeds outperformed him in spring training and made the major-league club.

Gill was then sold to the Baltimore Orioles of the Double-A International League, where he hit 34 home runs and batted .325 that year. After hitting .344 with 23 homers in 1931, he was purchased by the Washington Senators in September and appeared in 8 games as they battled with the New York Yankees for second place in the American League.

He played full-time in the Class A Southern Association for the Chattanooga Lookouts for the next two seasons, hitting over .300, before returning to the Senators for 13 games in July 1934, where he hit 2 home runs and batted .245.

Gill spent most of 1935 with the Double-A Minneapolis Millers, where he led the American Association with 43 home runs. He played three games that year as a September call-up with the pennant-winning Chicago Cubs. The next season was his last one in the major leagues and his most extensive, as he played in 71 games for the Cubs, hitting .253 with 7 home runs and 28 RBIs.

After the Cubs sold him to San Francisco Seals of the Double-A Pacific Coast League for the 1937 season, he returned to Chattanooga in 1938, playing for Baltimore again and his hometown Nashville Volunteers in 1938–39. Gill then played for the Portland Beavers of the PCL for six seasons before ending his career as a player-manager for the Union City Greyhounds and Fulton Chicks in the Class D Kentucky-Illinois-Tennessee League from 1946 to 1947.
