= Gordie Hinkle =

American baseball player (1905–1972)

- Catcher
- Born: April 3, 1905; Toronto, Ohio, U.S.
- Died: March 19, 1972 (aged 66); Houston, Texas, U.S.
- Batted: Right Threw: Right

MLB debut
- April 19, 1934, for the Boston Red Sox

Last MLB appearance
- September 30, 1934, for the Boston Red Sox

MLB statistics
- Batting average: .173
- Home runs: 0
- Runs batted in: 9
- Stats at Baseball Reference

Teams
- Boston Red Sox (1934)

Daniel Gordon Hinkle (April 3, 1905 – March 19, 1972) was an American professional baseball player, coach and manager. Born in Toronto, Ohio, he saw service in Major League Baseball as a backup catcher for the 1934 Boston Red Sox and as a coach for the 1939 Detroit Tigers. Listed at 6 feet (1.8 m) tall and 185 pounds (84 kg), Hinkle batted and threw right-handed.

Hinkle had a ten-season playing career, beginning in 1930 in the St. Louis Cardinals' farm system. The Red Sox acquired him in December 1933 and used him in 27 games to spell regular catcher Rick Ferrell, a future member of the Baseball Hall of Fame. In his one-season MLB career, Hinkle was a .173 hitter (13 hits in 75 at bats) with nine RBI, including seven runs scored, six doubles and one triple. He did not hit a home run. In 26 catching appearances, he posted a .992 fielding percentage, committing one error in 119 chances.

Hinkle returned to minor league baseball in 1935 and, apart from spending 1939 as the Tigers' bullpen coach, he spent the remainder of his baseball career in the minors as a player and manager, through 1948. He died in Houston, Texas, at age 66.

His younger brother Clarke Hinkle set the NFL career rushing record and was inducted into the Pro Football Hall of Fame in 1964.
