= Jim Moore (baseball) =

American baseball player (1903–1973)

- Pitcher
- Born: December 14, 1903 (Note: Birth date is per baseball records; Moore's circa 1942 draft registration card listed his date of birth as December 14, 1902.); Prescott, Arkansas, U.S.
- Died: May 19, 1973 (aged 69); Seattle, Washington, U.S.
- Batted: Right Threw: Right

MLB debut
- September 21, 1928, for the Cleveland Indians

Last MLB appearance
- April 23, 1932, for the Chicago White Sox

MLB statistics
- Win–loss record: 2–4
- Earned run average: 4.52
- Strikeouts: 29
- Stats at Baseball Reference

Teams
- Cleveland Indians (1928–1929); Chicago White Sox (1930–1932)

James Stanford Moore (December 14, 1903 – May 19, 1973) was an American professional baseball pitcher who played in Major League Baseball (MLB) from 1928 to 1932 with the Cleveland Indians and Chicago White Sox. Listed at 6 feet 0 inches (1.83 m) and 165 pounds (75 kg), he threw and batted right-handed.

== Biography ==
Born in 1903 in Prescott, Arkansas, Moore attended Hendrix College in Conway, Arkansas, where he played college baseball during 1923–1925.

Moore began his professional baseball career in 1928 with the Little Rock Travelers, a Class A team in the Southern Association. He pitched to a 15–21 win–loss record and 4.13 earned run average (ERA). Late in the season, he made his major league debut on September 21, pitching one game for the Cleveland Indians. Moore pitched a complete game but took the loss as the Indians were defeated by the Washington Senators, 2–1. Moore again pitched primarily for Little Rock in 1929, accruing a 6–20 record with 3.53 ERA. He appeared in two major league games with Cleveland, making two relief appearances without registering a decision.

In 1930, Moore went 15–13 for Little Rock with a 4.34 ERA. He appeared in nine games (five starts) that season with the Chicago White Sox, pitching to a 3.60 ERA with a 2–1 record. He is not to be confused with outfielder Jimmy Moore, who also played for the 1930 White Sox, although at different times during the season. (Note: Pitcher Jim Moore appeared in games during late August and September, while outfielder Jimmy Moore appeared in games from mid-April to mid-May.) Moore spent all of 1931 with the White Sox, making 33 appearances (four starts) with a 4.95 ERA and an 0–2 record. In 1932, Moore pitched for the Toledo Mud Hens, a Double-A team in the American Association, registering a 6–8 record in 31 games. He made his final major league appearance that season, pitching one inning for the White Sox in an April 23 loss to the St. Louis Browns.

Moore appeared in a total of 46 major league games over parts of five seasons, posting a 2–4 record with 4.52 ERA and 29 strikeouts in 139 1/3 innings pitched; he had three complete games and one save. Moore's professional career continued through 1938, as he pitched for the New Orleans Pelicans in the Southern Association in 1933, then spent five years in the Texas League, records of which are incomplete.

At age 39 during World War II, Moore was living in Oklahoma City and working at Midwest Air Depot (now Tinker Air Force Base). He married Vera May Montgomery in July 1943 in Oklahoma City. Moore died in 1973 at the age of 69 in Seattle, Washington, and was buried in Fairmount Cemetery in Denver, Colorado.
