= John Smith (1930s first baseman) =

American baseball player (1906–1982)

- First baseman
- Born: September 27, 1906; Washington, D.C.
- Died: May 9, 1982 (aged 75); Silver Spring, Maryland
- Batted: Switch Threw: Right

MLB debut
- September 17, 1931, for the Boston Red Sox

Last MLB appearance
- September 18, 1931, for the Boston Red Sox

MLB statistics
- Batting average: .133
- Home runs: 0
- Runs batted in: 1
- Stats at Baseball Reference

Teams
- Boston Red Sox (1931)

John Marshall Smith (September 27, 1906 – May 9, 1982) was a utility player in Major League Baseball who played briefly for the Boston Red Sox during the 1931 season. Listed at 6'1", 180 lb., Smith was a switch-hitter and threw right-handed.

== Life and career ==
He was born in Washington, D.C., and went to Eastern High School.

Smith appeared in four career games with Boston basically as a backup for first baseman Bill Sweeney. He posted a .133 batting average (2-for-15) with two runs and one RBI without extra bases. At first base, he collected 46 outs and did not commit an error for a perfect 1.000 fielding percentage.

Smith died at the age of 75 in Silver Spring, Maryland.
