= Pat Creeden =

American baseball player (1906–1992)

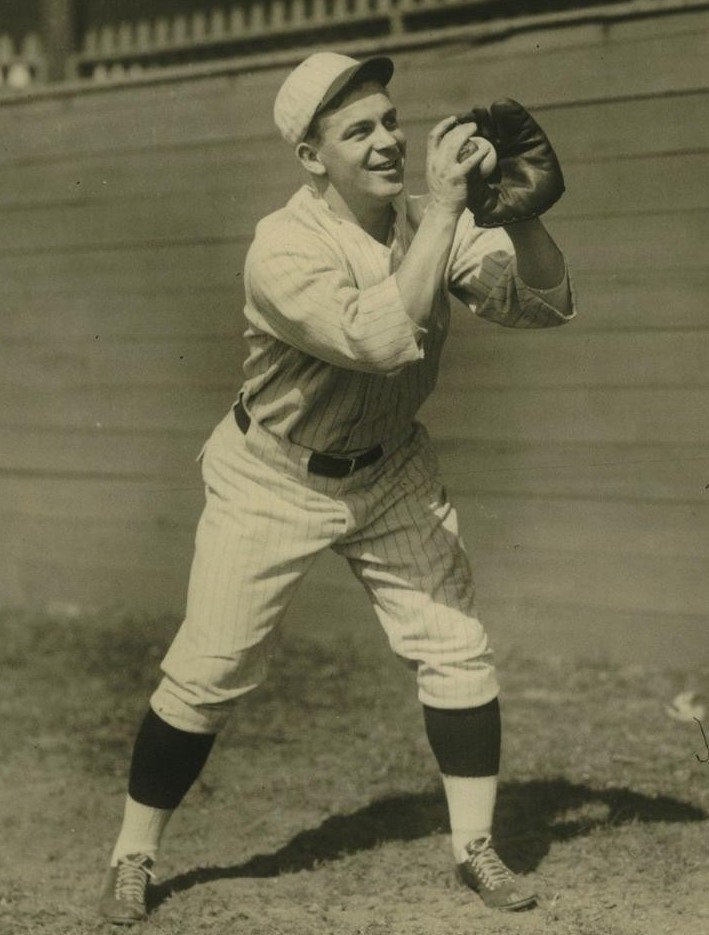
- Second baseman
- Born: May 23, 1906; Newburyport, Massachusetts, U.S.
- Died: April 20, 1992 (aged 85); Brockton, Massachusetts, U.S.
- Batted: Left Threw: Right

MLB debut
- April 14, 1931, for the Boston Red Sox

Last MLB appearance
- April 21, 1931, for the Boston Red Sox

MLB statistics
- Batting average: .000
- Home runs: 0
- Runs batted in: 0
- On-base percentage: .111
- Stats at Baseball Reference

Teams
- Boston Red Sox (1931)

Patrick Francis Creeden (May 23, 1906 – April 20, 1992) was an American baseball second baseman who played one season in Major League Baseball (MLB). He played five games for the Boston Red Sox in 1931. Nicknamed "Whoops", he batted left-handed but threw right-handed and was listed at 5 feet 8 inches (1.73 m) and 175 pounds (79 kg).

Signed by the Red Sox without having previously played any minor league baseball, Creeden made his debut on April 14, 1931. In eight at bats, he failed to amass a single hit and committed two errors. He played his final game on April 21, exactly a week after his debut. He never played professional baseball again and died on April 20, 1992, in Brockton, Massachusetts.

== Early life ==
Creeden was born on May 23, 1906, in Newburyport, Massachusetts. His father, Jeremiah Creeden, was a master plumber; his mother was Margaret (née Leary). While his maternal and paternal grandfathers were from Massachusetts, his grandmothers were both immigrants from Ireland. He had an older sister—who worked in the family's plumbing business as a bookkeeper—and a younger brother. Although his family originally resided in West Newbury, they moved to Brockton when Creeden started attending school. He graduated from Brockton High School in 1926.

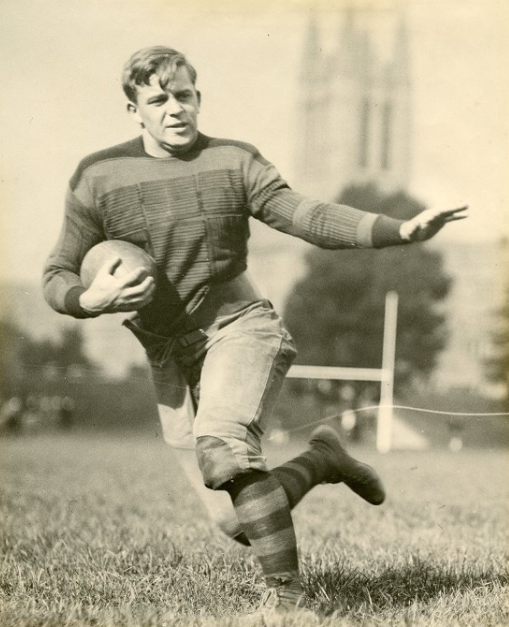
Creeden at Boston College in 1928

He proceeded to attend college at Boston College, where he played both football and baseball for the Boston College Eagles. Creeden played the position of left halfback and was viewed as the "freshman star" of the team during his first year. He was eventually appointed captain in 1930, the year he graduated from college. During his tenure with the team, he earned the nickname "Brockton flash". In baseball, he played as second baseman for the Eagles until his senior year. After graduating in 1930, Creeden coached the Fordham College freshman football team.

In 1924, while still a student at Brockton High, Creeden began playing summer baseball for Hyannis in the Cape Cod Baseball League. He returned to the league in 1925 to play for Chatham, then he was back to Hyannis in 1926, where he played each summer through 1930. After playing briefly for the Red Sox in 1931, he returned to play for the Cape League's Barnstable team for the remainder of that season. He was a member of Hyannis' 1926 and 1927 league championship clubs, and was reportedly a "very smart ball player, especially fast on his feet and one of the league's leading base stealers."

== Professional career ==
In the winter of 1930, the Boston Red Sox signed Creeden and announced the move on December 20, even though he had no prior experience in minor league baseball. In spring training of 1931, Creeden's promising performance led the Associated Press to suggest that he could replace Bobby Reeves as the team's starting second baseman. Although Reeves started the Red Sox's Opening Day game against the New York Yankees (leaving Creeden consigned to the bench), he was still able to make his major league debut in the same game when he entered as a pinch-hitter for shortstop Rabbit Warstler in the eighth inning and struck out in his first at bat.

After pinch-hitting for two more games against the Yankees, Creeden was finally given a chance to make his fielding debut on April 20 against the Washington Senators. Although he drew a walk, he remained hitless with two more at bats, committed a throwing error and was eventually replaced by Reeves, prompting the Boston Herald to criticize Creeden's lackluster performance. The following day, he again started the game and executed what The Washington Post described as a "snappy double play," but went 0 for 3 at the plate and made an error which loaded the bases. It was the last major league game he played and he ended his career hitless with an 0 for 8 batting average, 1 walk and 3 strikeouts.

== Personal life ==
After his Major League career ended, Creeden went on to enlist in the US Navy during World War II. From September 1942 to March 1946, he served as physical education class instructor and occasionally fought in the front line as well. After the end of the war, he served in the Department of Education branch of the Commonwealth of Massachusetts Division of Youth Service, working as the superintendent of John Augustus Hall in Oakdale, West Boylston until he retired in 1972. Creeden never married, and died on April 20, 1992, at the age of 85. He was interred at Calvary Cemetery in Brockton.

== See also ==
- Boston Red Sox all-time roster
