= Howie Storie =

American baseball player (1911–1968)

- Catcher
- Born: May 15, 1911; Pittsfield, Massachusetts, US
- Died: July 27, 1968 (aged 57); Pittsfield, Massachusetts, US
- Batted: Right Threw: Right

MLB debut
- September 7, 1931, for the Boston Red Sox

Last MLB appearance
- June 5, 1932, for the Boston Red Sox

MLB statistics
- Batting average: .200
- Home runs: 0
- Runs batted in: 0
- Stats at Baseball Reference

Teams
- Boston Red Sox (1931–1932)

Howard Edward Storie (May 15, 1911 – July 27, 1968) was an American professional baseball catcher. He was a reserve player for the Boston Red Sox of Major League Baseball (MLB) in 1931 and 1932. Listed at 5 feet 10 inches (1.78 m) and 175 pounds (79 kg), he batted and threw right-handed.

== Biography ==
Storie, nicknamed "Sponge", had a minor league career spanning 1931 to 1935; he played in a total of 131 minor league games for several different teams in the Eastern United States.

Storie's major league career consisted of 12 games with the Boston Red Sox; six in 1931 and another six in 1932. He went 5-for-25 for a .200 batting average, with two runs scored and no RBIs. Two of his major league hits came against Hall of Fame pitcher Herb Pennock on April 16, 1932. Entering a game against the New York Yankees defensively in the fifth inning, Storie singled off of Pennock in the seventh inning and again in the ninth.

After his baseball career, Storie operated a restaurant in Lenox, Massachusetts; he died in 1968, aged 57, in his hometown of Pittsfield, Massachusetts.
