= Bill Marshall (baseball) =

American baseball player (1911–1977)

- Second baseman
- Born: February 14, 1911; Dorchester, Massachusetts
- Died: May 5, 1977 (aged 66); Sacramento, California
- Batted: Right Threw: Right

MLB debut
- June 20, 1931, for the Boston Red Sox

Last MLB appearance
- September 21, 1934, for the Cincinnati Reds

MLB statistics
- Batting average: .125
- Home runs: 0
- Runs batted in: 0
- Stats at Baseball Reference

Teams
- Boston Red Sox (1931); Cincinnati Reds (1934)

William Henry Marshall (February 14, 1911 – May 5, 1977) was an American professional baseball second baseman. He batted and threw right-handed. Marshall played seven games in Major League Baseball: one for the Boston Red Sox in 1931 and six for the Cincinnati Reds in 1934. In 1931, he was the fourth youngest player in the American League. After retiring as a player, Marshall scouted for the Boston and Milwaukee Braves, the San Francisco Giants, and the Seattle Pilots.
