= Charlie Sullivan (baseball) =

American baseball player (1903–1935)

- Pitcher
- Born: May 23, 1903; Yadkin Valley, North Carolina, U.S.
- Died: May 28, 1935 (aged 32); Maiden, North Carolina, U.S.
- Batted: Left Threw: Right

MLB debut
- April 21, 1928, for the Detroit Tigers

Last MLB appearance
- September 22, 1931, for the Detroit Tigers

MLB statistics
- Win–loss record: 4-9
- Strikeouts: 68
- Earned run average: 5.78
- Stats at Baseball Reference

Teams
- Detroit Tigers (1928, 1930–31)

Charles Edward Sullivan (May 23, 1903 – May 28, 1935) was an American Major League Baseball pitcher. He played all or part of three seasons in the majors, 1928, 1930 and 1931, for the Detroit Tigers. Sullivan was killed in a car accident in 1935.
