= Pat Caraway =

American baseball player (1905–1974)

- Pitcher
- Born: September 26, 1905; Erath County, Texas, U.S.
- Died: June 9, 1974 (aged 68); El Paso, Texas, U.S.
- Batted: Left Threw: Left

MLB debut
- April 19, 1930, for the Chicago White Sox

Last MLB appearance
- July 17, 1932, for the Chicago White Sox

MLB statistics
- Win–loss record: 22–40
- Earned run average: 5.35
- Strikeouts: 151
- Stats at Baseball Reference

Teams
- Chicago White Sox (1930–1932)

Cecil Bradford Patrick Caraway (September 26, 1905 – June 9, 1974) was an American professional baseball pitcher who played for the Chicago White Sox of Major League Baseball from 1930 to 1932. He is buried in Gordon Cemetery in Gordon, Texas.

== Early life and career ==
Caraway was a lanky Texan who debuted professionally in 1927 with the minor league Rock Island Islanders. He also played for the Amarillo Texans and Topeka Jayhawks before being called up to the Chicago White Sox for the 1930 season, pitching in his first Sox game on 19 April 1930. His last major league game was 17 July 1932. A left-handed submarine delivery pitcher, Caraway was one of the few submariners in MLB history to develop a knuckleball. Though also possessing a blazing fastball and looping curve, Caraway always struggled with pitch control. He finished the 1932 season with Buffalo and continued the 1933 season with the Bisons of the International League. In 1933 he was featured on a black and white jig-saw puzzle as part of a Bisons ticket give-away promotion.

He finished his professional career in 1934 with the Tulsa Oilers and the San Antonio Missions in the Texas League, posting a 2–1 record with each team. Caraway's most remarkable day came in 1930, when he struck out Joe Sewell twice. Sewell was the most difficult batter in baseball history to strike out, and he struck out only three times all that season.

When Pat Caraway left baseball, he lived in El Paso, Texas, and became an engineer for the Texas and Pacific Railroad until his retirement in 1971. He is buried with other family members in the Caraway plot next to his wife, Harriet Christensen Caraway, in the New Gordon Cemetery on Cemetery Road in Gordon, Palo Pinto County, Texas.

== Personal life ==
His parents are William J "Dock" Caraway & Ara Mae Wilson Caraway. He was married to Harriet Christensen. They had no children.
