= Johnny Lucas (baseball) =

American baseball player (1903–1970)

- Outfielder
- Born: February 10, 1903; Glen Carbon, Illinois
- Died: October 31, 1970 (aged 67); Maryville, Illinois
- Batted: Right Threw: Left

MLB debut
- April 15, 1931, for the Boston Red Sox

Last MLB appearance
- April 16, 1932, for the Boston Red Sox

MLB statistics
- Games played: 4
- At bats: 3
- Strikeouts: 1
- Stats at Baseball Reference

Teams
- Boston Red Sox (1931–32)

John Charles Lucas (February 10, 1903 – October 31, 1970) nicknamed "Buster", was a backup outfielder who played briefly for the Boston Red Sox in the 1931-32 seasons. Listed at 5 ft 10 in (1.78 m), 186 lb., Lucas batted right-handed and threw left-handed. He was born in Glen Carbon, Illinois.

Over four games, Lucas went hitless in three at bats. He had no fielding chances in two outfield appearances.

Lucas died in Maryville, Illinois at age 67.
