= Jim Peterson (baseball) =

American baseball player (1908-1975)

- Pitcher
- Born: August 18, 1908; Philadelphia, Pennsylvania, U.S.
- Died: April 8, 1975 (aged 66); Palm Beach, Florida, U.S.
- Batted: Right Threw: Right

MLB debut
- July 9, 1931, for the Philadelphia Athletics

Last MLB appearance
- April 24, 1937, for the Brooklyn Dodgers

MLB statistics
- Win–loss record: 2–6
- Earned run average: 5.27
- Strikeouts: 29
- Stats at Baseball Reference

Teams
- Philadelphia Athletics (1931, 1933); Brooklyn Dodgers (1937)

James Niels Peterson (August 18, 1908 – April 8, 1975) was an American Major League Baseball pitcher from 1931 to 1937. He attended the University of Pennsylvania.

On September 30, 1933, Peterson was sent to the Louisville Colonels as part of the compensation for Johnny Marcum, whom the Athletics had acquired on August 20.

Born in Philadelphia, Peterson died in Palm Beach, Florida, aged 66.
