= Bill Andrus =

American baseball player (1907-1982)

- Third baseman
- Born: July 25, 1907; Beaumont, Texas, U.S.
- Died: March 12, 1982 (aged 74); Washington, D.C., U.S.
- Batted: Right Threw: Right

MLB debut
- September 19, 1931, for the Washington Senators

Last MLB appearance
- May 11, 1937, for the Philadelphia Phillies

MLB statistics
- Batting average: .000
- Games: 6
- At-Bats: 9
- Stats at Baseball Reference

Teams
- Washington Senators (1931); Philadelphia Phillies (1937)

William Morgan Andrus (July 25, 1907 – March 12, 1982), nicknamed "Andy", was an American Major League Baseball player. Andrus played in 1931 for the Washington Senators, and in 1937 for the Philadelphia Phillies, playing 3 games for each team. He was born in Beaumont, Texas and died in Washington, D.C.
