= Grant Bowler (baseball) =

American baseball player (1907–1968)

- Pitcher
- Born: October 24, 1907; Denver, Colorado, U.S.
- Died: June 25, 1968 (aged 60); Denver, Colorado, U.S.
- Batted: Right Threw: Right

MLB debut
- August 21, 1931, for the Chicago White Sox

Last MLB appearance
- August 14, 1932, for the Chicago White Sox

MLB statistics
- Win–loss record: 0–1
- Earned run average: 6.91
- Strikeouts: 17
- Stats at Baseball Reference

Teams
- Chicago White Sox (1931–1932)

Grant Tierney Bowler (October 24, 1907 – June 25, 1968) was an American professional baseball pitcher who played for the Chicago White Sox of Major League Baseball in 1931 and 1932.
