= Orlin Collier =

American baseball player (1907–1944)

- Pitcher
- Born: February 17, 1907; East Prairie, Missouri, U.S.
- Died: September 9, 1944 (aged 37); Memphis, Tennessee, U.S.
- Batted: Right Threw: Right

MLB debut
- September 11, 1931, for the Detroit Tigers

Last MLB appearance
- September 23, 1931, for the Detroit Tigers

MLB statistics
- Win–loss record: 0–1
- Earned run average: 7.84
- Strikeouts: 3
- Stats at Baseball Reference

Teams
- Detroit Tigers (1931)

Orlin Collier (February 17, 1907 – September 9, 1944) was an American Major League Baseball pitcher for the Detroit Tigers. He was married to Ruth Collier. Together they had one daughter, Dorisanna Collier. He died at the age of 37, suffering a fatal heart attack on a train during the return trip from a game.
