= Joe Mulligan =

American baseball player (1913–1986)

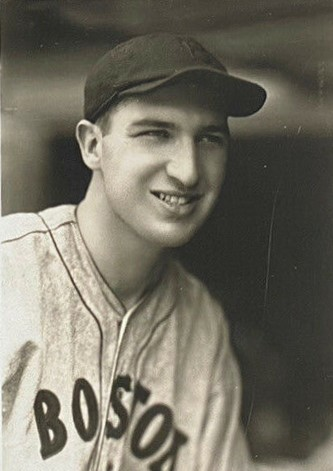
- Pitcher
- Born: July 31, 1913; Weymouth, Massachusetts, U.S.
- Died: June 5, 1986 (aged 72); West Roxbury, Massachusetts, U.S.
- Batted: Right Threw: Right

MLB debut
- June 28, 1934, for the Boston Red Sox

Last MLB appearance
- September 30, 1934, for the Boston Red Sox

MLB statistics
- Innings pitched: 44.2
- Earned run average: 3.63
- Win–loss record: 1-0
- Stats at Baseball Reference

Teams
- Boston Red Sox (1934)

Joseph Ignatius Mulligan (July 31, 1913 – June 5, 1986), nicknamed "Big Joe", was an American pitcher in Major League Baseball who played briefly for the Boston Red Sox during the 1934 season. Listed at 6 ft 4 in (1.93 m), 210 lb., Mulligan batted and threw right-handed.

A native of Weymouth, Massachusetts, Mulligan attended the College of the Holy Cross. In his lone major league season, he posted a 1–0 record with 13 strikeouts and a 3.63 ERA in 14 appearances, including two starts, one complete game and 44 2/3 innings of work for Boston. In 1936, Mulligan pitched for Falmouth in the Cape Cod Baseball League. He died in 1986 in West Roxbury, Massachusetts at age 72.

== See also ==
- 1934 Boston Red Sox season
- Boston Red Sox all-time roster
