= Sol Carter =

American baseball player

- Pitcher
- Born: December 23, 1908; Picayune, Mississippi, U.S.
- Died: December 23, 2006 (aged 98); El Dorado, Arkansas, U.S.
- Batted: Right Threw: Right

MLB debut
- April 15, 1931, for the Philadelphia Athletics

Last MLB appearance
- April 21, 1931, for the Philadelphia Athletics

MLB statistics
- Win–loss record: 0–0
- Earned run average: 19.29
- Strikeouts: 1
- Stats at Baseball Reference

Teams
- Philadelphia Athletics (1931)

Solomon Mobley "Sol" Carter (December 23, 1908 – December 23, 2006) was a relief pitcher in Major League Baseball who played for the Philadelphia Athletics in the 1931 season. He batted and threw right-handed.

In two appearances, Carter posted a 0–0 record with two strikeout, four walks, and a 19.29 ERA in 2 2/3 innings pitched.

At the time of his death on his 98th birthday, Carter was recognized as the fourth oldest living former major leaguer.
