= Frank Grube =

American baseball and football player (1905–1945)

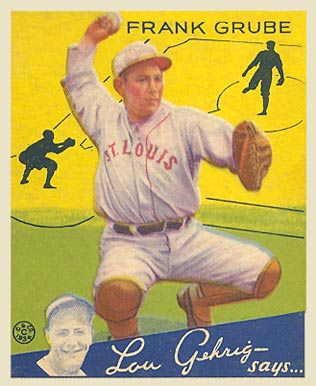
- Grube 1934 Goudey baseball card
- Catcher
- Born: January 7, 1905; Easton, Pennsylvania, US
- Died: July 2, 1945 (aged 40); New York City, US
- Batted: Right Threw: Right

MLB debut
- May 12, 1931, for the Chicago White Sox

Last MLB appearance
- May 30, 1941, for the St. Louis Browns

MLB statistics
- Batting average: .244
- Home runs: 1
- Runs batted in: 107
- Stats at Baseball Reference

Teams
- Chicago White Sox (1931–1933); St. Louis Browns (1934–1935); Chicago White Sox (1935–1936); St. Louis Browns (1941)

Franklin Thomas Grube (January 7, 1905 – July 2, 1945) was an American professional baseball and professional football player. In baseball, he was a catcher whose career lasted for 14 seasons (1928–1941), including 394 games in Major League Baseball as a member of the Chicago White Sox (1931–1933 and 1935–1936) and St. Louis Browns (1934–1935 and 1941). In football, he played left end for the New York football Yankees of the NFL, appearing in 11 games in 1928. Grove was listed as 5 feet 9 inches (1.75 m) tall and weighed 190 pounds (86 kg); he threw and batted right-handed.

Grube was born in Easton, Pennsylvania, and attended Lafayette College in that city. In the majors, he collected 274 hits, including 59 doubles and one home run (struck off New York's Ivy Andrews at Yankee Stadium on September 12, 1931, in a rare tie game, called on account of darkness); he batted .244 with 107 runs batted in. Grube was the White Sox' most used catcher in both 1932 and 1933.

He was hit by a bullet intended for a friend he was visiting in New York City, and died July 2, 1945, at Knickerbocker Hospital at age 40.
