= Walter Murphy (baseball) =

American baseball player (1907–1976)

- Pitcher
- Born: September 27, 1907; New York, New York
- Died: March 23, 1976 (aged 68); Houston, Texas
- Batted: Right Threw: Right

MLB debut
- April 19, 1931, for the Boston Red Sox

Last MLB appearance
- April 21, 1931, for the Boston Red Sox

MLB statistics
- Win–loss record: 0-0
- Earned run average: 9.00
- Strikeouts: 0
- Stats at Baseball Reference

Teams
- Boston Red Sox (1931)

Walter Joseph Murphy (September 27, 1907 – March 23, 1976) was a relief pitcher in Major League Baseball who played briefly for the Boston Red Sox during the 1931 season. Listed at 6 ft 1.5 in (1.87 m), 180 lb., Murphy batted and threw right-handed. He was born in New York, New York.

In two relief appearances, Murphy allowed two runs and four hits, giving one walk with no strikeouts in two innings of work for a 9.00 earned run average. He did not have a decision or saves.

Murphy died at the age of 68 in Houston, Texas.
