= Irv Jeffries =

American baseball player (1905–1982)

- Infielder
- Born: September 10, 1905; Louisville, Kentucky, U.S.
- Died: June 8, 1982 (aged 76); Louisville, Kentucky, U.S.
- Batted: Right Threw: Right

MLB debut
- April 30, 1930, for the Chicago White Sox

Last MLB appearance
- July 4, 1934, for the Philadelphia Phillies

MLB statistics
- Batting average: .234
- Home runs: 8
- Runs batted in: 46
- Stats at Baseball Reference

Teams
- Chicago White Sox (1930–1931); Philadelphia Phillies (1934)

Irvine Franklin Jeffries (September 10, 1905 – June 8, 1982) was an American infielder in Major League Baseball. He played for the Chicago White Sox and Philadelphia Phillies. After his Major League career ended, he played in the Minor Leagues with the Portland Beavers and the Fort Worth Cats.
