= Lou Garland =

American baseball player (1905–1990)

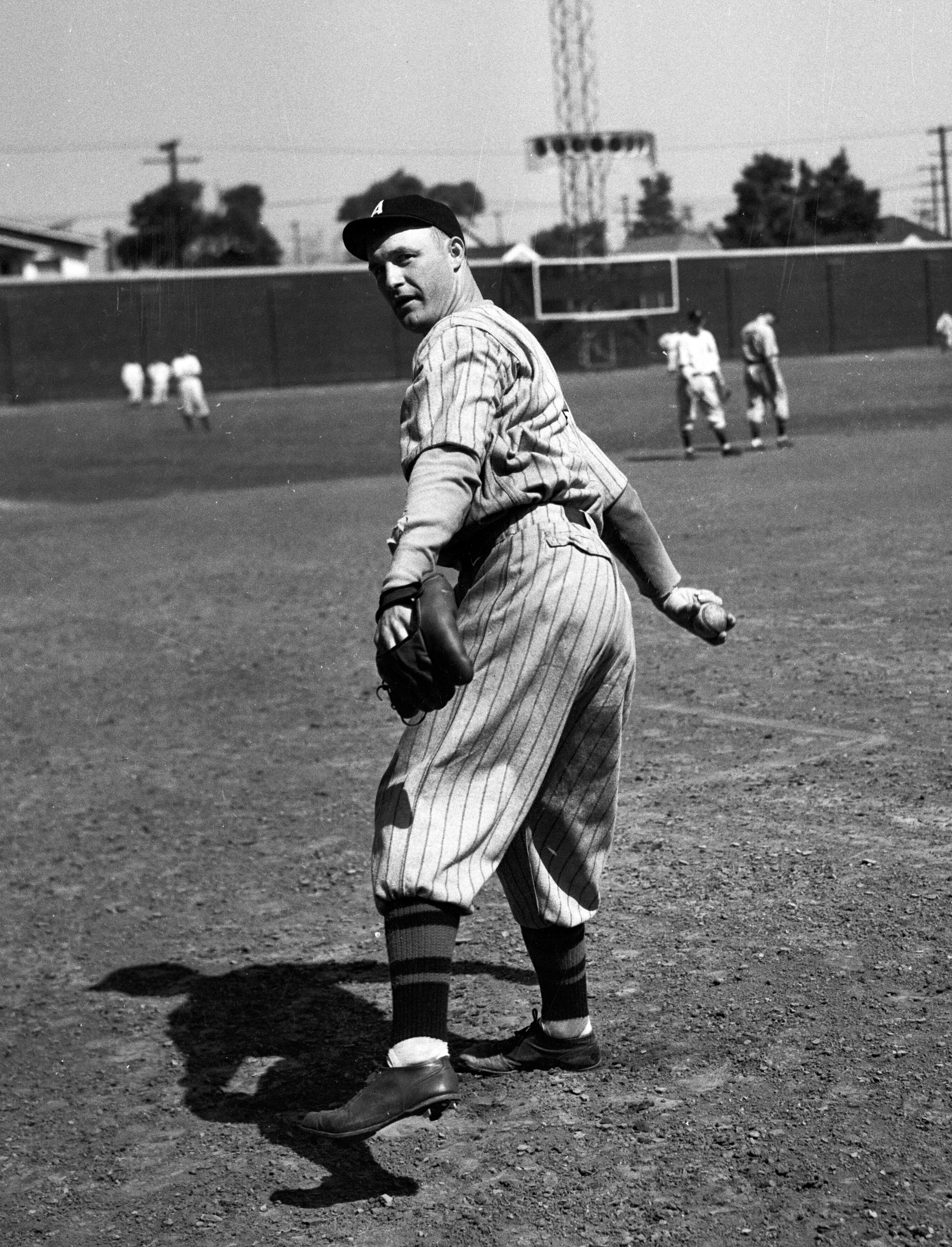
- Pitcher
- Born: July 16, 1905; Archie, Missouri, U.S.
- Died: August 30, 1990 (aged 85); Idaho Falls, Idaho, U.S.
- Batted: Right Threw: Right

MLB debut
- August 31, 1931, for the Chicago White Sox

Last MLB appearance
- September 27, 1931, for the Chicago White Sox

MLB statistics
- Win–loss record: 0–2
- Earned run average: 10.26
- Strikeouts: 4
- Stats at Baseball Reference

Teams
- Chicago White Sox (1931)

Louis Lyman Garland (July 16, 1905 – August 30, 1990) was an American pitcher in Major League Baseball. He played for the Chicago White Sox in 1931.
