= Shano Collins =

American baseball player (1885–1955)

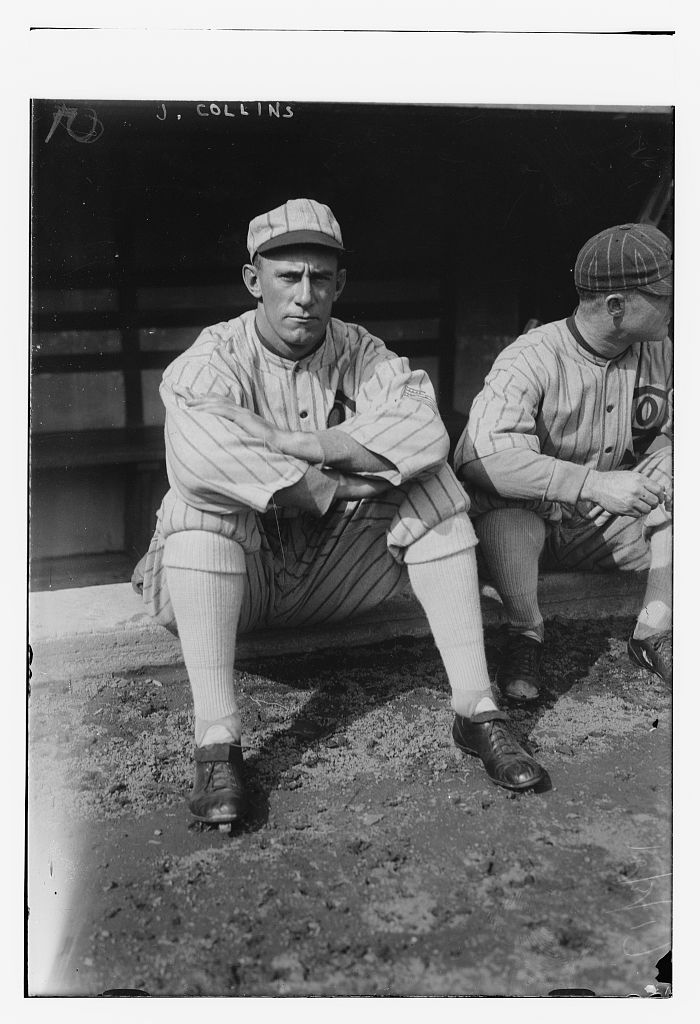
- Rightfielder / First baseman / Manager
- Born: December 4, 1885; Charlestown, Boston, Massachusetts, U.S.
- Died: September 10, 1955 (aged 69); Newton, Massachusetts, U.S.
- Batted: Right Threw: Right

MLB debut
- April 21, 1910, for the Chicago White Sox

Last MLB appearance
- May 15, 1925, for the Boston Red Sox

MLB statistics
- Batting average: .264
- Home runs: 22
- Runs batted in: 708
- Managerial record: 73–134
- Winning %: .353
- Stats at Baseball Reference

Teams
- As player: Chicago White Sox (1910–1920); Boston Red Sox (1921–1925); As manager: Boston Red Sox (1931–1932)

Career highlights and awards
- World Series champion (1917)

John Francis "Shano" Collins (December 4, 1885 – September 10, 1955) was an American right fielder and first baseman in Major League Baseball for the Chicago White Sox and Boston Red Sox.

== Early life ==
Collins was born on December 4, 1885, in Boston's Charlestown neighborhood and grew up in Newton, Massachusetts. His nickname Shano (pronounced and sometimes spelled "Shauno") came about as a clubhouse corruption of Sean, the Gaelic equivalent of John.

== Baseball career ==
=== Minor leagues ===
Collins first gained notice as a pitcher in semipro leagues, however an arm injury would force him off the mound. He played shortstop Haverhill of the Class B New England League in 1907. He missed the following season due to injury and returned to professional baseball in 1909 as a second baseman with the Springfield Ponies of the Connecticut State League. In 88 games, Collins batted .322 with 8 home runs. On August 14, 1909, his contract was purchased by the Chicago White Sox.

=== Major league career ===
Collins made his major league debut on April 21, 1910. That season he played first base behind Chick Gandil, but he was quickly moved to right field, where he developed a reputation for having one of the strongest throwing arms in baseball. In 1911, Gandil's contract was sold and Collins became the starting first baseman. He batted .262 and hit a career-high four home runs, good for eighth in the league. In 1912, Collins played 153 games, batting .290 with 2 home runs and 86 RBI. Following the season he married Elizabeth C. Doyle of Pittsfield, Massachusetts. In 1914, Collins placed third in the American League with 34 doubles. The following season he finished fourth in RBIs with 85. Collins won a World Series with the Sox in 1917, delivering the game-winning hit in the pennant-clinching game. He batted .286 (6 for 21) in the 1917 World Series, going 3-for-4 in Game 1. In 1918, he set a record with three bases-loaded triples in one season, which stood alone for 31 years until Elmer Valo tied the mark in 1949. Collins still holds the MLB career record of eight triples with the bases loaded. During the notorious 1919 World Series, tainted by the Black Sox Scandal, Collins went 4-for-16 at the plate for the White Sox. He was not among those implicated in the scandal. In the indictments of the key figures in the Black Sox scandal, Collins is named as the wronged party. The indictment claims that by throwing the World Series the alleged conspirators defrauded him of $1,784.

In 1921, Collins and Nemo Leibold were traded to the Red Sox for Harry Hooper. On June 2, 1925, Collins was released by the Red Sox at his own request so he could become manager of the Pittsfield Hillies of the Eastern League.

=== Managing ===
Collins managed the Des Moines Demons in 1926 and 1927 before returning to Pittsfield in 1928. In 1930, Collins became manager of Nashua Millionaires. However, the league folded in June, which led to Collins' return to Des Moines. After taking over the club, the Demons improved last place to third place by the end of the season.

Following the 1930 season, Red Sox owner Bob Quinn attempted to hire manager Joe McCarthy away from the New York Yankees. After he was unable to get McCarthy, Quinn hired Collins. Collins was not signed to a contract, but Quinn promised he would keep the job "as long...he hustles and runs the club to my satisfaction". The Red Sox improved to 62–90 in their first season under Collins. However, in 1932 Boston started the season 11–44 and Collins was replaced by Marty McManus. Following his departure from the Red Sox, Collins scouted for the Detroit Tigers. In 1942, Collins briefly returned to baseball as manager of the Hillies.

==== Managerial record ====
Team	Year	Regular season					Postseason			
Team	Year	Games	Won	Lost	Win %	Finish	Won	Lost	Win %	Result
BOS	1931	152	62	90	.408	6th in AL	–	–	–	–
BOS	1932	55	11	44	.200	fired	–	–	–	–
Total		207	73	134	.353		0	0	–	

=== Career statistics ===
In 1799 games over 16 seasons, Collins compiled a .264 batting average (1687-for-6390), with 747 runs, 310 doubles, 133 triples, 22 home runs, 708 RBI, 223 stolen bases, 331 bases on balls, .306 on-base percentage and .364 slugging percentage. In 10 World Series games, he hit .270 (10-37) with four runs scored. He recorded an overall .973 fielding percentage.

== Later life ==
After his managing career ended, Collins opened a restaurant Collins Bar & Grill in Newton. Collins and his wife, Elizabeth, had three daughters and two sons. One of their sons, Robert, was killed during the Battle of Iwo Jima. Collins' grandson, Bob Gallagher, played first base for the Red Sox, Astros and Mets from 1972 to 1975.

Collins died on September 10, 1955, at his home in Newton, Massachusetts. He was 69 years old.

== See also ==
- List of Major League Baseball career triples leaders
- List of Major League Baseball career stolen bases leaders
