= Bennie Tate =

American baseball player (1901–1973)

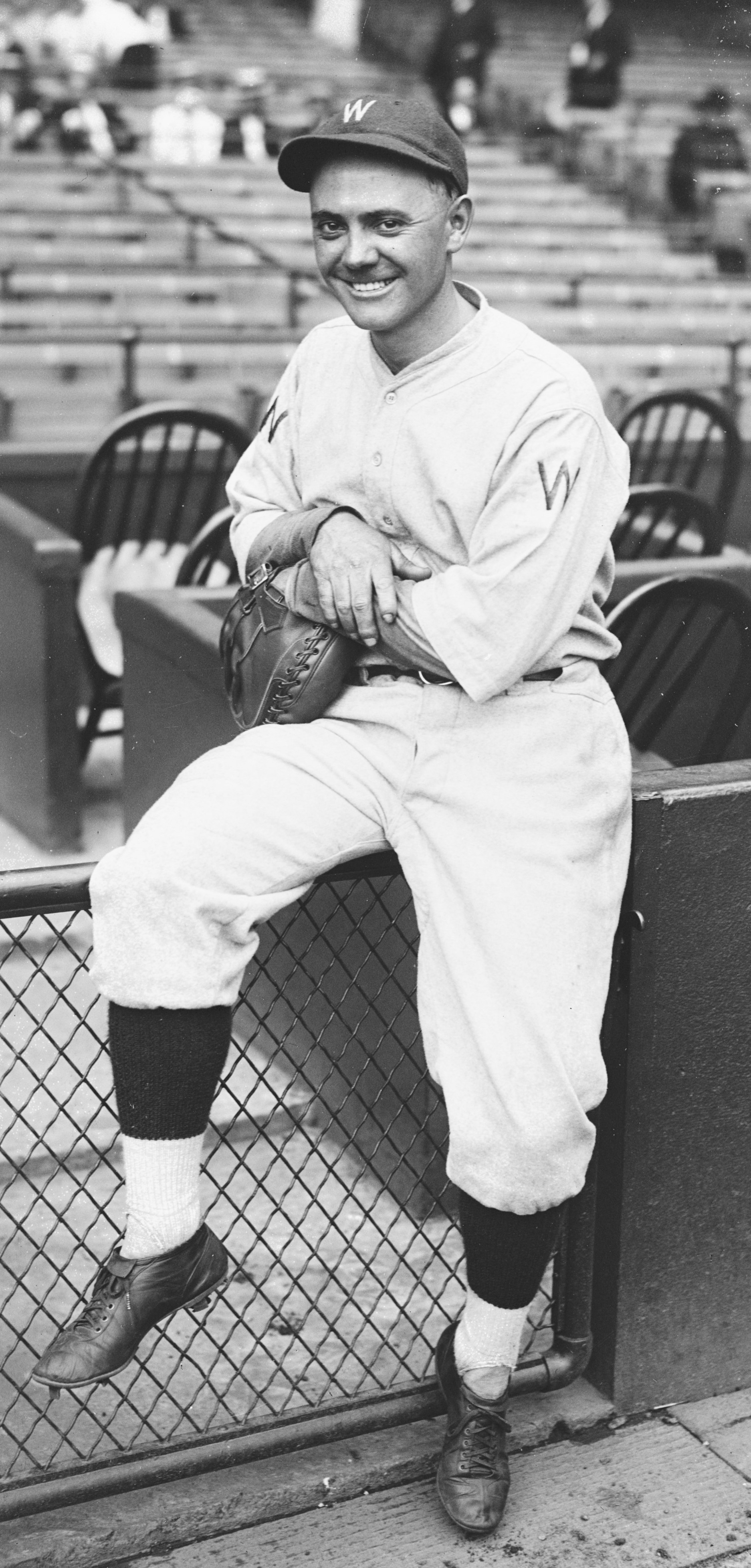
- Tate in 1925
- Catcher
- Born: December 3, 1901; Whitwell, Tennessee, U.S.
- Died: October 27, 1973 (aged 71); West Frankfort, Illinois, U.S.
- Batted: Left Threw: Right

MLB debut
- April 29, 1924, for the Washington Senators

Last MLB appearance
- July 28, 1934, for the Chicago Cubs

MLB statistics
- Batting average: .279
- Home runs: 4
- Runs batted in: 173
- Stats at Baseball Reference

Teams
- Washington Senators (1924–1930); Chicago White Sox (1930–1932); Boston Red Sox (1932); Chicago Cubs (1934)

Career highlights and awards
- World Series champion (1924)

Henry Bennett Tate (December 3, 1901 – October 27, 1973) was an American professional baseball catcher in Major League Baseball for the Washington Senators (1924–30), Chicago White Sox (1930–32), Boston Red Sox (1932) and Chicago Cubs (1934).

He helped the Senators win the 1924 World Series and the 1925 American League pennant.

Tate was born in Whitwell, Tennessee. In 10 seasons he played in 566 games and had 1,560 at bats, 144 runs, 435 hits, 68 doubles, 16 triples, 4 home runs, 173 RBI, 5 stolen bases, 118 walks, .279 batting average, .330 on-base percentage, .351 slugging percentage, 547 total bases and 34 sacrifice hits. Defensively, he recorded a .974 fielding percentage.

He died in West Frankfort, Illinois, at the age of 71.

== Sources ==
- Media related to Bennie Tate at Wikimedia Commons
- Career statistics from Baseball Reference · Baseball Reference (Minors) · Retrosheet
