= Rabbit Warstler =

American baseball player (1903–1964)

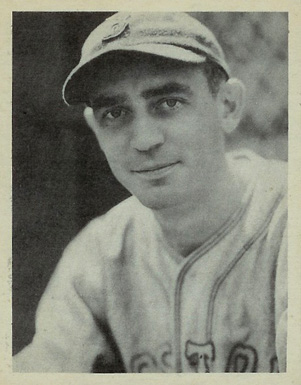
- Shortstop
- Born: September 13, 1903; North Canton, Ohio, U.S.
- Died: May 31, 1964 (aged 60); North Canton, Ohio, U.S.
- Batted: Right Threw: Right

MLB debut
- July 24, 1930, for the Boston Red Sox

Last MLB appearance
- September 29, 1940, for the Chicago Cubs

MLB statistics
- Batting average: .229
- Home runs: 11
- Runs batted in: 332
- Stats at Baseball Reference

Teams
- Indianapolis Indians (1927); Quincy Red Birds (1927); Indianapolis Indians (1928-1930); Boston Red Sox (1930–33); Philadelphia Athletics (1934–36); Boston Bees (1936–40); Chicago Cubs (1940); Los Angeles Angels (1941); Minneapolis Miners (1942); Fort Worth Cats (1942)

Harold Burton "Rabbit" Warstler (September 13, 1903 – May 31, 1964) was an American professional baseball infielder. He played all or part of 11 seasons in Major League Baseball as a shortstop and second baseman for the Boston Red Sox (1930–33), Philadelphia Athletics (1934–36), Boston Bees (1936–40) and Chicago Cubs (1940).

== Early life ==
Warstler was born on September 13, 1903, to postmaster and village treasurer Edwin W. Warstler and his wife Ella in North Canton (formerly New Berlin), Ohio. Known as Rap, Warstler was the oldest of five children. Warstler graduated from North Canton High School in 1921. Warstler married Grace Mohler, on November 11, 1921 and had three children. Warstler worked for and played on the Hoover Company sandlot baseball team from 1921-22. Playing on an Ohio based traveling semi-pro baseball team, Warstler was discovered in 1927 by a scout for the Indianapolis Indians AA club of the American Association.

== Minor league career ==
In 1927, Warstler played 23 games for the Indianapolis Indians with a .208 average with one home run. Warstler spent the bulk of 1927 playing 128 games for the Quincy Red Birds of the Illinois-Indiana-Iowa League, with a .351 average and eight home runs. Warstler returned to the Indianapolis Indians for the next three years, where he compiled a .285 average with 19 home runs in 408 games. During his minor league career, Warstler compiled a fielding percentage of 92.9%.

When Warstler joined the Boston Red Sox in 1930, he flew from Indianapolis to Boston became "first ball player rookie to ride to the big show in an airship".

== Major League Career ==
In his career, Warstler played in 1,205 games and had 4,088 at bats, 431 runs scored, 935 hits, 133 doubles, 36 triples, 11 home runs, 332 RBI, 42 stolen bases, 405 walks, a .229 batting average, a .300 on-base percentage, a .287 slugging percentage, 1,173 total bases, and 107 sacrifice hits.

Warstler was a member of the “All Americans” exhibition team assembled by Connie Mack of American League players that toured Asia-Pacific in 1934. Exhibition games were played in Honolulu, Nagoya, Tokyo, Osaka, Hakodate, Kokuru, Sendai, Kyoto, Omiya, Utsunomiya, Toyama, Shizuoka, Yokohama, Shanghai, and Manila. Warstler was joined by Connie Mack, Babe Ruth, Jimmy Foxx, Lou Gehrig, Lefty Gomez, Charlie Gehringer, Earl Averill, Bing Miller, Moe Berg, Earl Whitehill, Frank Hayes, Eric McNair, Joe Cascarella, and Clint Brown. Warstler then joined Ruth, Gehrig, Gomez and other players for a circumnavigation cruise stopping in Java, Fiji, Singapore, Ceylon, and Marseilles.

Warstler died of lung cancer in his hometown of North Canton, Ohio at the age of 60.
