= Al Van Camp =

American baseball player (1903–1981)

- First baseman / Left fielder
- Born: September 7, 1903; Moline, Illinois, U.S.
- Died: February 2, 1981 (aged 77); Davenport, Iowa, U.S.
- Batted: Right Threw: Right

MLB debut
- September 11, 1928, for the Cleveland Indians

Last MLB appearance
- June 23, 1932, for the Boston Red Sox

MLB statistics
- Batting average: .261
- Doubles: 20
- Runs batted in: 41
- Stats at Baseball Reference

Teams
- Cleveland Indians (1928); Boston Red Sox (1931–1932)

Albert Joseph Van Camp (September 7, 1903 – February 2, 1981) was an American backup first baseman and left fielder in Major League Baseball who played from 1928 through 1932 for the Cleveland Indians (1928) and Boston Red Sox (1931–1932). Listed at 5' 10", 175 lb., Van Camp batted and threw right-handed.

== Biography ==
Van Camp was born in Moline, Illinois. In 1927, Van Camp hit .309 with 11 home runs for the Des Moines Demons of the Western League before entering the majors in 1928 with Cleveland. His most productive season came with the 1931 Red Sox, when he posted career-numbers in games (101), hits (89), runs (34) and RBI (33), while hitting .275, also a career-high. Before the 1933 season, he was traded by Boston to the Louisville Colonels of the American Association in exchange for catcher Merv Shea.

In a three-season career, Van Camp was a .261 hitter (116-for-444) with 44 runs and 41 RBI in 140 games, including 20 doubles, six triples, four stolen bases, and a .301 on-base percentage without home runs.

== Death ==
Van Camp died at the age of 77 in Davenport, Iowa. He is interred at Mount Calvary Cemetery in Davenport.
