= Bill Sweeney (first baseman) =

American baseball player (1904–1957)

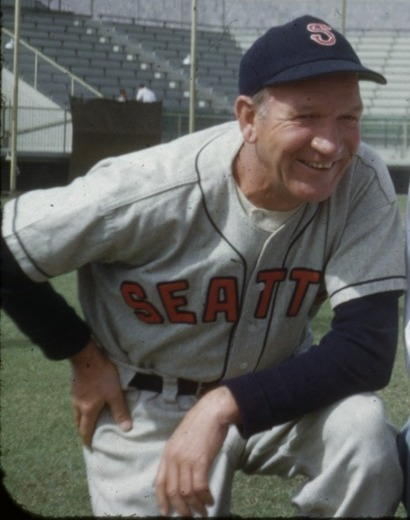
- Sweeney with the Seattle Rainiers in 1953
- First baseman
- Born: December 29, 1904; Cleveland, Ohio, U.S.
- Died: April 18, 1957 (aged 52); San Diego, California, U.S.
- Batted: Right Threw: Right

MLB debut
- April 13, 1928, for the Detroit Tigers

Last MLB appearance
- September 27, 1931, for the Boston Red Sox

MLB statistics
- Batting average: .286
- Home runs: 5
- Runs batted in: 107
- Stats at Baseball Reference

Teams
- Detroit Tigers (1928); Boston Red Sox (1930–1931)

William Joseph Sweeney (December 29, 1904 – April 18, 1957) was an American first baseman and coach in Major League Baseball and a longtime manager at the minor league level. Sweeney threw and batted right-handed, stood 5 ft 11 in (1.80 m) (185 cm) tall and weighed 180 pounds (82 kg) in his playing days.

== Major League first baseman ==
Born in Cleveland, Ohio, Sweeney was the nephew of former major league infielder William John Sweeney (1886–1948), who played eight seasons in the National League between 1907 and 1914. The younger Sweeney, however, would play his three MLB seasons in the American League, for the Detroit Tigers (1928) and Boston Red Sox (1930–31), appearing in 308 games and garnering an even 300 hits in 1,050 at bats for a .286 batting average, with 58 doubles, eight triples, five home runs and 107 runs batted in. He recorded a .994 fielding percentage as a first baseman.

== Pacific Coast League fixture ==
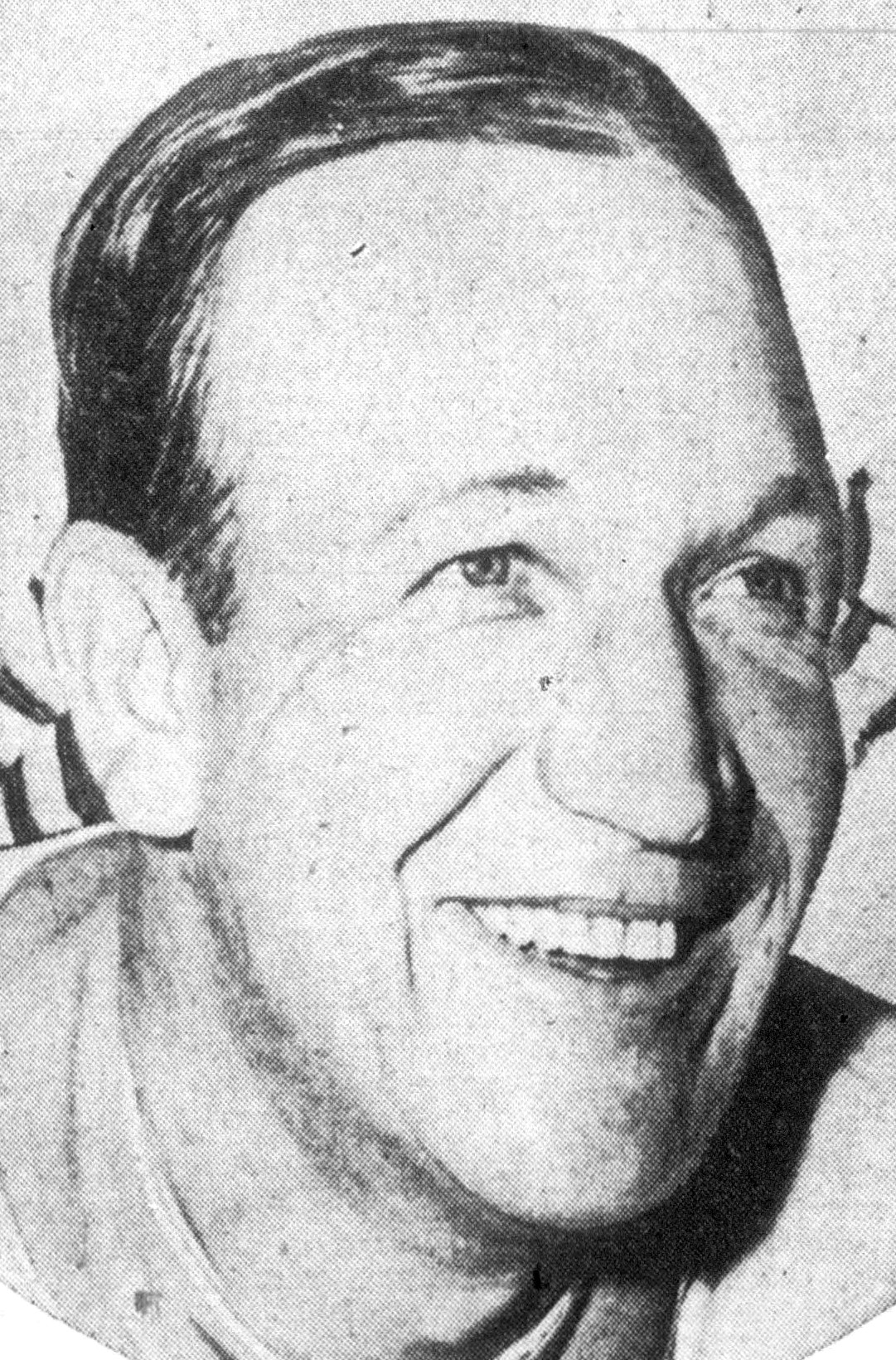
Sweeney, circa 1943

He would become better known in baseball as a manager in the Pacific Coast League. On May 11, 1936, Sweeney succeeded former Philadelphia Athletics star infielder Max Bishop as playing manager of the Portland Beavers, and promptly led them to the 1936 PCL championship. Sweeney led Portland through 1939, then switched to the rival Hollywood Stars (1940–41).

In 1942, he was a playing coach for the crosstown Los Angeles Angels, then was promoted to manager of the Seraphs in 1943. Although his 1943–44 Angels captured PCL regular-season titles – and his '43 squad won 110 of 155 (.710) games – each team fell in the PCL post-season playoffs, and Sweeney's first term as manager of the Angels ended after the 1946 campaign. He then returned to the American League for two seasons, working as a coach for the Tigers under manager Steve O'Neill (1947–48).

== Manager of four PCL teams ==
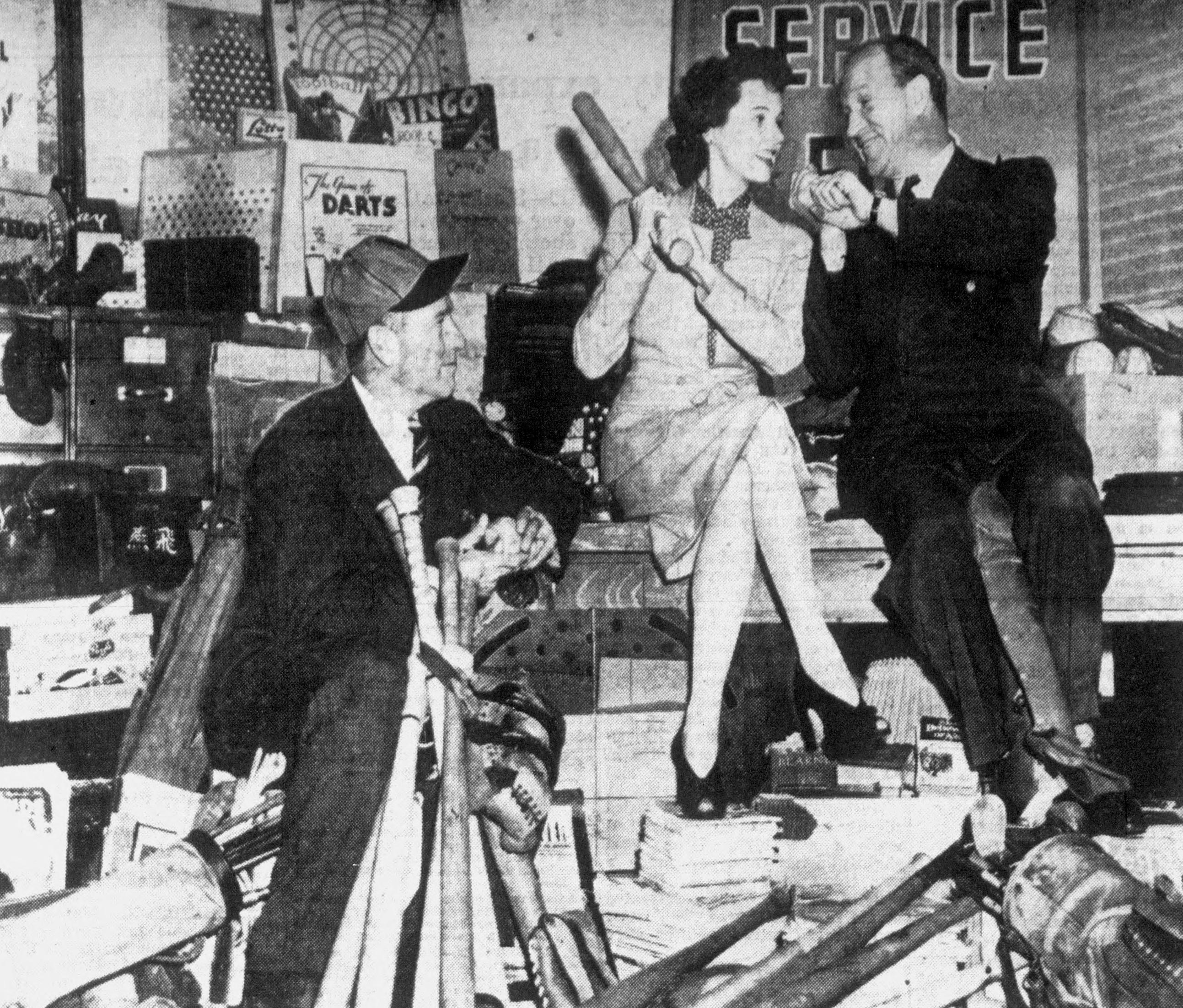
(L-R): Hollywood Stars manager Charlie Root, actress Jane Wyatt and Los Angeles Angels manager Bill Sweeney sit atop a pile of baseball equipment donated to members of the United States Armed Forces at military installations in Southern California in 1943

Sweeney moved back to the Pacific Coast League in 1949 for his second term as manager of the Portland Beavers. In four seasons (1949–52), the Beavers posted two winning records but no championships. After a successful, second-place finish with the 1953 Seattle Rainiers, Sweeney resumed the helm of the Angels for a second term there, but a losing record in 1954 was compounded by a poor start to 1955, and Sweeney was replaced by Bob Scheffing in midyear.

But Sweeney came back to the field, and Portland, in the midseason of 1956 for a third and final stint as skipper of the Beavers. He succeeded Tommy Holmes as manager and led the Beavers to a third-place finish and was invited to return for 1957. However, on April 18, only six games into the 1957 campaign, Sweeney was stricken with a perforated ulcer in San Diego, where his club was playing. He survived emergency surgery but then died from a heart attack at the age of 52. He was interred in Resurrection Cemetery, San Gabriel, California.

Bill Sweeney's career record as a manager in the PCL was 1,471 victories and 1,452 defeats (.503) with one championship over all or parts of 18 seasons. He was selected to the Pacific Coast League Hall of Fame in 2004.

== Sources ==
- Career statistics from Baseball Reference · Baseball Reference (Minors) · Retrosheet · Baseball Almanac
- Johnson, Lloyd, and Wolff, Miles, eds., The Encyclopedia of Minor League Baseball, 3rd edition. Durham, North Carolina: Baseball America, 2007.
- Baseball Almanac
- Retrosheet
