= Hank Johnson (baseball) =

American baseball player (1906–1982)

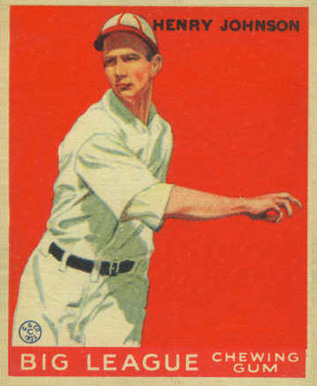
- Pitcher
- Born: May 21, 1906; Bradenton, Florida, U.S.
- Died: August 20, 1982 (aged 76); Bradenton, Florida, U.S.
- Batted: Right Threw: Right

MLB debut
- April 17, 1925, for the New York Yankees

Last MLB appearance
- September 19, 1939, for the Cincinnati Reds

MLB statistics
- Win–loss record: 63–56
- Earned run average: 4.75
- Strikeouts: 568
- Stats at Baseball Reference

Teams
- New York Yankees (1925–1926, 1928–1932); Boston Red Sox (1933–1935); Philadelphia Athletics (1936); Cincinnati Reds (1939)

Career highlights and awards
- World Series champion (1928)

Henry Ward Johnson (May 21, 1906 – August 20, 1982) was an American pitcher who played in Major League Baseball between the 1925 and 1939 seasons. Listed at 5 feet 11 inches (1.80 m), 175 pounds (79 kg), Johnson batted and threw right-handed. He was born in Bradenton, Florida.

Johnson entered the majors in 1925 with the New York Yankees, playing for them seven years (1925–26, 1928–32) before joining the Boston Red Sox (1933–35), Philadelphia Athletics (1936) and Cincinnati Reds (1939). He divided his playing time as a starter, middle reliever, and occasional closer during a career hampered by illness. His most productive years came with the Yankees, winning 14 games in 1928 and 1930 and 13 in 1931. Johnson developed a chronic bursitis that eventually ended his career.

In a 12-season career, Johnson posted a 63–56 record with 568 strikeouts and a 4.75 ERA in 249 appearances, including 116 starts, 45 complete games, four shutouts, 11 saves and 1066 1/3 innings of work.

Johnson was a good hitting pitcher in his major league career. He compiled a .215 batting average (81-for-376) with 48 runs, 2 home runs and 32 RBIs.

After baseball Johnson was in auto sales and county constable. Johnson died on August 20, 1982 at Manatee Memorial Hospital in Bradenton after a lengthy illness at age 76. His funeral occurred at Fogartyville Cemetery.
