= Butch Henline =

American baseball player and umpire (1894–1957)

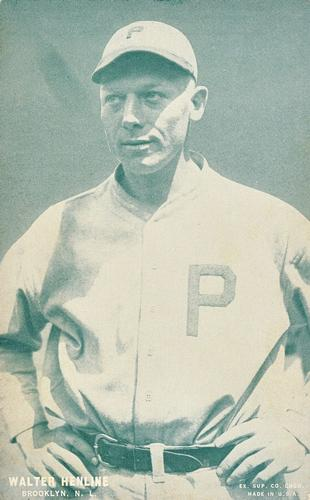
- Catcher
- Born: December 20, 1894; Fort Wayne, Indiana, U.S.
- Died: October 9, 1957 (aged 62); Sarasota, Florida, U.S.
- Batted: Right Threw: Right

MLB debut
- April 13, 1921, for the New York Giants

Last MLB appearance
- July 18, 1931, for the Chicago White Sox

MLB statistics
- Batting average: .291
- Home runs: 40
- Runs batted in: 268
- Stats at Baseball Reference

Teams
- New York Giants (1921); Philadelphia Phillies (1921–1926); Brooklyn Robins (1927–1929); Chicago White Sox (1930–1931)

Walter John "Butch" Henline (December 20, 1894 – October 9, 1957) was an American catcher and umpire in Major League Baseball who played from 1921 to 1931 for the New York Giants, Brooklyn Robins, Philadelphia Phillies and Chicago White Sox. He spent most of his career with the Phillies, batting .316 as a rookie in 1922 and .324 in 1923 before his playing time gradually decreased.

Born in Fort Wayne, Indiana, Henline was working in Cleveland, Ohio in 1918 when a local restaurant owner – aware of Henline's play on semi-pro teams – encouraged him to contact former star Nap Lajoie, who lived nearby. After doing so, he was signed two weeks later by the Indianapolis club of the American Association, but did not join the team until the following year due to military service during World War I. In his 1922 rookie year with the Phillies, he led the National League in fielding percentage with a .983 mark, and on September 15 of that year he hit three home runs. In March 1925, Henline was named team captain of the Phillies.

After his playing career ended in the minor leagues in 1934, he became a motel operator in Florida, but took up umpiring soon afterward after recalling that Bill Klem had encouraged him to pursue the profession. He began working in the Southeastern League before moving up to the International League from 1940 to 1944, and then the NL.

Henline served as an NL umpire from 1945 to 1948, and officiated in the 1947 All-Star Game. He went on to become supervisor of umpires in the Florida International League from 1949 to 1954 before that league folded. He died of cancer at age 62 at his home in Sarasota, Florida, and his cremated remains were interred at Manasota Memorial Park in Bradenton.

On August 24, 1948, Henline was the first umpire to eject Jackie Robinson from a major league game. Robinson, Bruce Edwards, and coach Clyde Sukeforth were ejected for bench jockeying in a game at Forbes Field against the Pittsburgh Pirates.

In 740 games over 11 seasons, Henline compiled a .291 batting average (611-for-2101) with 258 runs, 96 doubles, 21 triples, 40 home runs, 268 RBI, 192 base on balls, .361 on-base percentage and .414 slugging percentage. He was hit by pitch 38 times and had 51 sacrifice hits. Defensively, he posted a .971 fielding percentage.
