= Ivy Andrews =

American baseball player (1907–1970)

- Pitcher
- Born: May 6, 1907; Dora, Alabama, U.S.
- Died: November 24, 1970 (aged 63); Birmingham, Alabama, U.S.
- Batted: Right Threw: Right

MLB debut
- August 15, 1931, for the New York Yankees

Last MLB appearance
- September 28, 1938, for the New York Yankees

MLB statistics
- Win–loss record: 50–59
- Earned run average: 4.14
- Strikeouts: 257
- Stats at Baseball Reference

Teams
- New York Yankees (1931–1932); Boston Red Sox (1932–1933); St. Louis Browns (1934–1936); Cleveland Indians (1937); New York Yankees (1937–1938)

Career highlights and awards
- World Series champion (1937)

Ivy Paul "Poison" Andrews (May 6, 1907 – November 24, 1970) was an American Major League Baseball pitcher with the New York Yankees, Boston Red Sox, St. Louis Browns and the Cleveland Indians between 1931 and 1938. Andrews batted and threw right-handed. He was born in Dora, Alabama.

Andrews was bothered by arm ailments much of his career. He spent eight seasons in the American League with the Yankees, Red Sox, Browns and Indians, being used as both a starter and long reliever. His most productive season came in 1935 for the seventh-place Browns, when he had a 13–7 record and a 3.54 ERA (eighth in the league). In a second stint for the Yankees, he pitched 5 2/3 innings of relief in Game Four of the 1937 World Series. In the latter part of his career, Andrews added a knuckleball and screwball to a pitch repertoire that consisted of a "blazing fastball", a curveball and a changeup.

In 249 appearances (108 as a starter), Andrew posted a 50–59 record with 257 strikeouts and a 4.14 ERA in 1,041 innings.

Andrews returned to Alabama in 1945 to become the Birmingham Barons' first pitching coach. He managed the team briefly during the 1947 season, and retired from baseball a year later. In poor health, Andrews was hospitalized at Carraway Methodist Hospital in Birmingham, Alabama on November 22, 1970 after complaining of chest pains. Andrews suffered a series of heart attacks at the hospital and died on November 24 at age 63. He was inducted posthumously into the Alabama Sports Hall of Fame in 1985 along with former Yankees teammate Joe Sewell.
