= Cy Perkins =

American baseball player, coach, and manager (1896–1963)

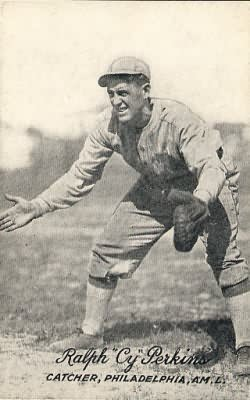
- Catcher / Coach / Manager
- Born: February 27, 1896; Gloucester, Massachusetts, U.S.
- Died: October 2, 1963 (aged 67); Philadelphia, Pennsylvania, U.S.
- Batted: Right Threw: Right

MLB debut
- September 25, 1915, for the Philadelphia Athletics

Last MLB appearance
- September 30, 1934, for the Detroit Tigers

MLB statistics
- Batting average: .259
- Home runs: 30
- Runs batted in: 409
- Managerial record: 6–9
- Winning %: .400
- Stats at Baseball Reference

Teams
- As player: Philadelphia Athletics (1915–1930); New York Yankees (1931); Detroit Tigers (1934); As manager: Detroit Tigers (1937); As coach: New York Yankees (1932–1933); Detroit Tigers (1934–1937); Philadelphia Phillies (1946–1954)

Career highlights and awards
- 2× World Series champion (1932, 1935)

Ralph Foster "Cy" Perkins (February 27, 1896 – October 2, 1963) was an American professional baseball player, coach and manager. He played as a catcher in Major League Baseball most notably for the Philadelphia Athletics. Perkins batted and threw right-handed, stood 5 feet 10 inches (1.78 m) tall and weighed 158 pounds (72 kg). He was born in Gloucester, Massachusetts.

== Career ==
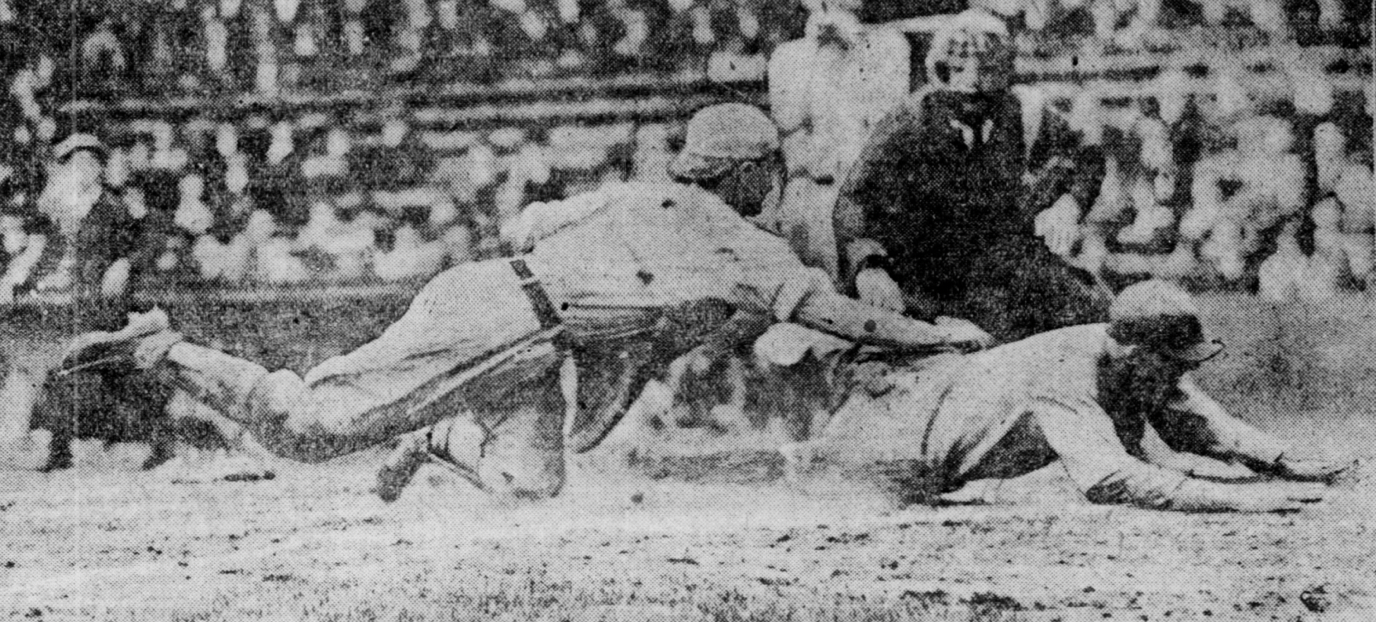
Perkins tags out Phillies' Russ Wrightstone on April 8, 1922 at Shibe Park

Perkins served as a catcher with the Philadelphia Athletics (1915, 1917–30), New York Yankees (1931) and Detroit Tigers (1934). He was the starting catcher for Philadelphia until Mickey Cochrane joined the team in 1925. After that Perkins served as a backup, being hailed as the man who taught Cochrane to catch without injuring his hands. He also was a member of the Athletics' World Series champion teams in 1929 and 1930.

In 17 MLB seasons and 1,171 games played, Perkins was a .259 hitter with 933 hits, 175 doubles, 35 triples, 30 home runs, and 409 runs batted in.

Following his playing career, Perkins coached for 17 years in the Major Leagues with the Yankees (1932–33), Tigers (1934–39) and Philadelphia Phillies (1946–54). He worked with two World Series champions, the Yankees of 1932 and the Tigers of 1935, and for two league pennant-winners, the 1934 Tigers and the 1950 Phillies. He also managed Detroit in 1937 (along with Cochrane and Del Baker) and posted a 6–9 record.

Cy Perkins died in Philadelphia at the age of 67, and was interred in Oak Grove Cemetery in his native Gloucester.
