= Jimmy Moore (baseball) =

American baseball player (1903–1986)

- Outfielder
- Born: April 24, 1903; Paris, Tennessee
- Died: March 7, 1986 (aged 82); Memphis, Tennessee
- Batted: Right Threw: Right

MLB debut
- April 17, 1930, for the Chicago White Sox

Last MLB appearance
- September 27, 1931, for the Philadelphia Athletics

MLB statistics
- Batting average: .254
- Home runs: 4
- Runs batted in: 35
- Stats at Baseball Reference

Teams
- Chicago White Sox (1930); Philadelphia Athletics (1930–1931)

Career highlights and awards
- World Series champion (1930)

James William Moore (April 24, 1903 – March 7, 1986) was an American professional baseball left fielder. He played in Major League Baseball (MLB) for two seasons with the Chicago White Sox (1930) and Philadelphia Athletics (1930–1931). He attended Union University.

In a two-season career, Moore was a .254 hitter (59-for-232) with four home runs and 35 RBI in 80 games, including 32 runs, 10 doubles, one triple, one stolen base, and a .316 on-base percentage.

Moore died at the age of 82 in Memphis, Tennessee. He was the last surviving member of the 1930 World Champion Philadelphia Athletics.
