= 1930 Detroit Tigers season =

Major League Baseball season

1930 Detroit Tigers
- League: American League
- Ballpark: Navin Field
- City: Detroit, Michigan
- Record: 75–79 (.487)
- League place: 5th
- Owners: Frank Navin
- Managers: Bucky Harris
- Radio: WWJ (AM) (Ty Tyson)

The 1930 Detroit Tigers season was a season in American baseball. The team finished fifth in the American League with a record of 75–79, 27 games behind the Philadelphia Athletics.

== Regular season ==
=== Season standings ===
American League
Team	W	L	Pct.	GB	Home	Road
Philadelphia Athletics	102	52	.662	—	58‍–‍18	44‍–‍34
Washington Senators	94	60	.610	8	56‍–‍21	38‍–‍39
New York Yankees	86	68	.558	16	47‍–‍29	39‍–‍39
Cleveland Indians	81	73	.526	21	44‍–‍33	37‍–‍40
Detroit Tigers	75	79	.487	27	45‍–‍33	30‍–‍46
St. Louis Browns	64	90	.416	38	38‍–‍40	26‍–‍50
Chicago White Sox	62	92	.403	40	34‍–‍44	28‍–‍48
Boston Red Sox	52	102	.338	50	30‍–‍46	22‍–‍56

=== Record vs. opponents ===
1930 American League record Sources:
Team	BOS	CWS	CLE	DET	NYY	PHA	SLB	WSH
Boston	—	13–9	7–15	8–14	6–16	4–18	9–13	5–17
Chicago	9–13	—	10–12	9–13	8–14	6–16	12–10	8–14
Cleveland	15–7	12–10	—	11–11	10–12	7–15	16–6	10–12
Detroit	14–8	13–9	11–11	—	9–13	7–15	11–11	10–12
New York	16–6	14–8	12–10	13–9	—	10–12	16–6	5–17
Philadelphia	18–4	16–6	15–7	15–7	12–10	—	16–6	10–12
St. Louis	13–9	10–12	6–16	11–11	6–16	6–16	—	12–10
Washington	17–5	14–8	12–10	12–10	17–5	12–10	10–12	—

=== Notable transactions ===
- May 30, 1930: Harry Rice, Ownie Carroll and Yats Wuestling were traded by the Tigers to the New York Yankees for Waite Hoyt and Mark Koenig.

=== Roster ===
1930 Detroit Tigers
Roster
Pitchers: Tommy Bridges; Guy Cantrell; Ownie Carroll; Art Herring; Elon Hogsett; Waite Hoyt; Phil Page; Joe Samuels; Vic Sorrell; Charlie Sullivan; George Uhle; Earl Whitehill; Whit Wyatt	Catchers: Gene Desautels; Pinky Hargrave; Ray Hayworth; Tony Rensa; Hughie Wise; Infielders: Bill Akers; Dale Alexander; Charlie Gehringer; Mark Koenig; Marty McManus; Billy Rogell; Jimmy Shevlin; Johnny Watson; Yats Wuestling	Outfielders: Frank Doljack; Paul Easterling; Bob Fothergill; Liz Funk; Tom Hughes; Roy Johnson; Harry Rice; John Stone; Other batters: Hank Greenberg	Manager: Bucky Harris; Coaches: Jean Dubuc; Benny Meyer

== Player stats ==
=== Batting ===
==== Starters by position ====
Note: Pos = Position; G = Games played; AB = At bats; H = Hits; Avg. = Batting average; HR = Home runs; RBI = Runs batted in

Pos	Player	G	AB	H	Avg.	HR	RBI
C	Ray Hayworth	77	227	63	.278	0	22
1B	Dale Alexander	154	602	196	.326	20	135
2B	Charlie Gehringer	154	610	201	.330	16	98
SS	Mark Koenig	76	267	64	.240	1	16
3B	Marty McManus	132	484	155	.320	9	89
OF	John Stone	127	425	132	.311	3	56
OF	Roy Johnson	125	462	127	.275	2	35
OF	Liz Funk	140	527	145	.275	4	65

==== Other batters ====
Note: G = Games played; AB = At bats; H = Hits; Avg. = Batting average; HR = Home runs; RBI = Runs batted in

Player	G	AB	H	Avg.	HR	RBI
Bill Akers	85	233	65	.279	9	40
Billy Rogell	54	144	24	.167	0	9
Bob Fothergill	55	143	37	.259	2	14
Pinky Hargrave	55	137	39	.285	5	18
Harry Rice	37	128	39	.305	2	24
Gene Desautels	42	126	24	.190	0	9
Paul Easterling	29	79	16	.203	1	14
Frank Doljack	20	74	19	.257	3	17
Tom Hughes	17	59	22	.373	0	5
Tony Rensa	20	37	10	.270	1	3
Jimmy Shevlin	28	14	2	.143	0	2
Johnny Watson	4	12	3	.250	0	3
Yats Wuestling	4	9	0	.000	0	0
Hughie Wise	2	6	2	.333	0	0
Hank Greenberg	1	1	0	.000	0	0

=== Pitching ===
==== Starting pitchers ====
Note: G = Games pitched; IP = Innings pitched; W = Wins; L = Losses; ERA = Earned run average; SO = Strikeouts

Player	G	IP	W	L	ERA	SO
George Uhle	33	239.0	12	12	3.65	117
Vic Sorrell	35	233.1	16	11	3.86	97
Earl Whitehill	34	220.2	17	13	4.24	109
Waite Hoyt	26	135.2	9	8	4.78	25

==== Other pitchers ====
Note: G = Games pitched; IP = Innings pitched; W = Wins; L = Losses; ERA = Earned run average; SO = Strikeouts

Player	G	IP	W	L	ERA	SO
Elon Hogsett	33	146.0	9	8	5.42	54
Whit Wyatt	21	85.2	4	5	3.57	68
Art Herring	23	77.2	3	3	5.33	16
Tommy Bridges	8	37.2	3	2	4.06	17
Ownie Carroll	6	20.1	0	5	10.62	4
Mark Koenig	2	9.0	0	1	10.00	6

==== Relief pitchers ====
Note: G = Games pitched; W = Wins; L = Losses; SV = Saves; ERA = Earned run average; SO = Strikeouts

Player	G	W	L	SV	ERA	SO
Charlie Sullivan	40	1	5	5	6.53	38
Guy Cantrell	16	1	5	0	5.66	20
Phil Page	12	0	1	0	9.75	2
Joe Samuels	2	0	0	0	16.50	1

== Farm system ==
Level	Team	League	Manager
AA	Toronto Maple Leafs	International League	Steve O'Neill
A	Hartford Senators	Eastern League	King Bader
A	Beaumont Exporters	Texas League	Del Baker
B	Evansville Hubs	Illinois–Indiana–Iowa League	Bob Coleman
C	Wheeling Stogies	Middle Atlantic League	Bobby Prysock and Dan Tapson

Hartford club folded, June 30, 1930
