= John Watson =

John, Johnny, or Johnie Watson may refer to:

== Government and politics ==
- John Watson (16th-century MP) (fl. 1547–1554), member of parliament for Morpeth, Newcastle upon Tyne and Berwick-upon-Tweed
- Sir John Watson (advocate) (1883–1944), Scottish advocate and sheriff, solicitor general for Scotland 1929–31
- John Watson (Australian politician) (1937–2025), Australian senator
- John Watson (Queensland politician) (1833–1912), member of the Queensland Legislative Assembly
- John Watson (Skipton MP) (born 1943), British member of parliament for Skipton, 1979–1989
- John Watson (Virginia politician) (died 1870), African-American politician in Virginia
- John A. Watson, member of the California State Assembly
- Sir John Bertrand Watson (1878–1948), British member of parliament for Stockton-on-Tees, 1917–1923
- John C. Watson (judge) (1878–1970), justice of the New Mexico Supreme Court
- Chris Watson (John Christian Watson, 1867–1941), Australia's third prime minister
- John H. Watson (Vermont judge) (1851–1929), Vermont attorney and judge
- John Hampton Watson (1804–1883), American judge
- John S. Watson (New Jersey politician) (1924–1996), African-American Democratic Party politician in New Jersey
- John T. Watson (1908–2007), justice of the New Mexico Supreme Court
- J. W. Watson Sr. (1859–1942), mayor of Miami and speaker of the Florida House of Representatives
- John William Clark Watson (1808–1890), Confederate politician and judge

== Military ==
- Sir John Watson (Indian Army officer) (1829–1919), English recipient of the Victoria Cross in 1857
- John C. Watson (admiral) (1842–1923), admiral of the United States Navy
- John Watson Tadwell Watson (1748–1826), British Army general

== Music ==
- Daddy Stovepipe (1867–1963), real name Johnny Watson, African-American blues singer
- Johnny "Guitar" Watson (1935–1996), American blues guitarist
- John M. Watson Sr. (1937–2006), American actor and musician
- John L. Watson (singer) (1941–2014), American singer who fronted English rock band The Web

== Art ==
- John Watson (American painter) (1685–1768), American portrait artist
- John Watson, later Sir John Watson Gordon (1788–1864), Scottish painter
- John Watson (English artist) (born 1971), English artist and comicbook artist
- John Dawson Watson (1832–1892), British painter, watercolorist, and illustrator

== Sports ==
=== Association football ===
- John Watson (footballer, born 1877) (1877–?), Scottish football player (Everton)
- Jock Watson (1883–1946), Scottish footballer
- John Watson (footballer, born 1906) (1906–1973), Scottish footballer
- John Fox Watson (1917–1976), believed to be the only Scottish football player in Real Madrid's history
- John Watson (footballer, born 1942), football player (Chester City)
- John Watson (footballer, born 1959), football player (Fulham)
- Johnny Watson (footballer) (1963–1987), Peruvian footballer

=== Baseball ===
- Johnie Watson (1896–1958), American baseball player
- Johnny Watson (baseball) (1908–1965), American baseball player

=== Cricket ===
- John Watson (cricketer, born 1828) (1828–1920), Australian cricketer who made one appearance for Tasmania
- John Watson (Somerset cricketer) (1910–1980), English cricketer who made 19 appearances for Somerset

=== Other sports ===
- Sir John Watson (polo), British polo player
- John Watson (golfer), American golfer
- John Watson (curler) (c. 1914–1974), Canadian curler
- John Watson (bowls) (born 1945), former Scottish lawn and indoor bowler
- John Watson (racing driver) (born 1946), British Formula One driver
- John Watson (cyclist) (born 1947), British Olympic cyclist
- John Watson (American football) (1949–2022), NFL offensive lineman
- John L. Watson (born 1951), American chess master
- John Watson (equestrian) (born 1952), Irish Olympic equestrian
- John Watson (boxer) (born 1983), British lightweight boxer

== Fiction ==
- Dr. Watson, fictional associate and biographer of detective Sherlock Holmes in Arthur Conan Doyle's stories
- John Watson, known as Wonko the Sane, character from the novel So Long, and Thanks For All the Fish by Douglas Adams

== Other ==
- John Watson (Master of Christ's College, Cambridge) (died 1537), priest, academic, and Vice-Chancellor of Cambridge University
- John Watson (bishop) (1520–c.1584), Bishop of Winchester
- John Watson (officer of arms), English 17th century Bluemantle Pursuivant
- John Watson (antiquary) (1725–1783), English clergyman and antiquary
- John Boles Watson (c.1748–1813), English theatre builder
- John Watson (priest, died 1839) (1767–1839), English clergyman, archdeacon of St Albans
- John Watson (priest, died 1665), Irish Anglican priest, dean of Ferns
- John Watson (college president) (1771–1802), first president of Jefferson College, Pennsylvania
- John Fanning Watson (1779–1860), American antiquarian
- John Kippen Watson (1816–1891), improver of Edinburgh's gas lighting
- John Selby Watson (1804–1884), British classical translator and murderer
- John Forbes Watson (1827–1892), Scottish physician and writer on India
- John Watson (philosopher) (1847–1939), Canadian philosopher and academic
- John Watson (1850–1907), Scottish theologian and author who wrote under the pseudonym Ian Maclaren
- John Duncan Watson (1860–1946), British civil engineer
- John B. Watson (1878–1958), American psychologist; pioneer of behaviorism
- John Watson (1914–2007), known as Adam Watson, British international relations theorist and researcher, and ambassador
- John S. Watson (Chevron CEO) (born 1956), American businessman and former CEO of Chevron Corporation
- John Watson (activist) (died 2001), American black activist and editor
- John Watson (film producer), English film producer
- John Boyd Watson (1828–1889), Australian mining magnate and investor
- John Michael Watson (1936–2024), English botanist
- John Steven Watson (1916–1986), English historian and principal of the University of St Andrews
- Jack Watson (cattle station manager) (John Watson, 1852–1896), cattle station manager in Australia
- John Reay Watson (1872–1944), Australian journalist and writer

== See also ==
- Jack Watson (disambiguation)
- Jonathan Watson (born 1957), Scottish comedian and impressionist
