= Johnny Watson (disambiguation) =

Johnny "Guitar" Watson (1935 – 1996) was an American musician and singer-songwriter.

Johnny Watson may also refer to:

- Johnny Watson (1867 – 1963), American blues musician known by the stage name Daddy Stovepipe
- Johnny Watson (baseball) (1908 – 1965), American baseball player
- Johnny Watson (footballer) (1963 – 1987), Peruvian footballer

== See also ==
- Johnie Watson (1896 – 1958), American baseball player
- John Watson (disambiguation)
- Johnny Guitar (disambiguation)
