= Jack Watson =

Jack Watson may refer to:

- Jack Watson (actor) (1915–1999), English actor
- Jack Watson (American football) (1893–1963), American football player and coach
- Jack Watson (Australian footballer) (1927–2013), Australian rules footballer
- Jack Watson (British Army officer) (1917–2011)
- Jack Watson (cattle station manager) (1852−1896)
- Jack Watson (cricketer) (1921–2012), English cricketer
- Jack Watson (footballer, born 1892) (1892–1957), English football defender for Birmingham
- Jack Watson (presidential adviser) (born 1938), White House Chief of Staff to President Jimmy Carter
- Jack Watson (Scottish footballer) (1911–1944)
- Jack C. Watson (1928–2022), American jurist, Justice of the Louisiana Supreme Court
- John Fox Watson (1917–1976), Scottish footballer, nicknamed Jack

== See also ==
- John Watson (disambiguation)
