= John H. Watson =

John H. Watson may refer to:

- Dr. Watson (John H. Watson), a fictional character in the Sherlock Holmes stories by Sir Arthur Conan Doyle
- John H. Watson (Vermont judge), Vermont attorney and judge
- John Hampton Watson, American doctor, lawyer, and judge in Kansas

== See also ==
- John Watson (disambiguation)
