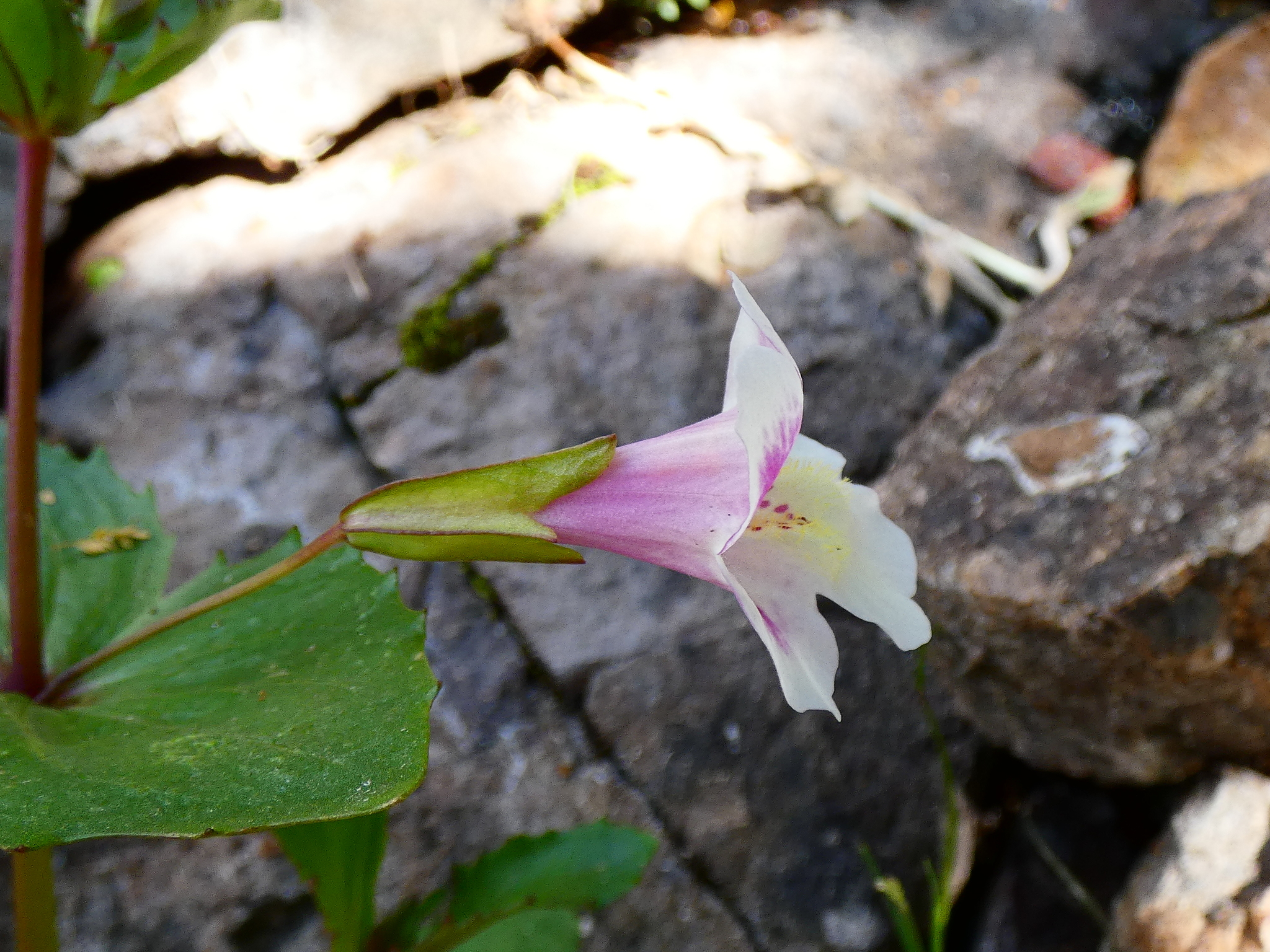
- Talca, Maule Region, Chile, 2023

Scientific classification
- Kingdom: Plantae
- Clade: Embryophytes
- Clade: Tracheophytes
- Clade: Angiosperms
- Clade: Eudicots
- Clade: Asterids
- Order: Lamiales
- Family: Phrymaceae
- Genus: Erythranthe
- Species: E. naiandina

Binomial name
- Erythranthe naiandina (J.M.Watson & C.Bohlen) G.L.Nesom

Synonyms
- Mimulus naiandinus J.M.Watson & C.Bohlen

= Erythranthe naiandina =

Species of flowering plant

Erythranthe naiandina, the Chilean monkey flower (Spanish: berro rosado), is a perennial species of flowering plant in the family Phrymaceae. It is native to Maule Region in central Chile. This plant has been awarded the Award of Garden Merit by the Royal Horticultural Society. It was formerly known as Mimulus naiandinus.

== Taxonomy ==
This species was first described by John Michael Watson and Christian von Bohlen in a paper published in 2000.

== Distribution ==
This plant is found within Region VI and Region VII in Chile at low altitudes and interior valleys.

== Description ==
The flowers are trumpet-shaped and are usually white or pink with purple spots. Like most plants in and formerly in the genus Mimulus, the patterns on their flowers cause them to resemble a grinning monkey, hence the vernacular name 'monkey flower' for such plants.

This species can grow 30 cm wide and up to 20 cm tall. It is deciduous.

== Cultivation ==
The rock gardening enthusiasts Watson, who first described the species, and Martyn Cheese first collected it in Chile and introduced this species into cultivation in Britain in the 1990s, where it was sold there under the name Mimulus cv. 'Andean Nymph'. In the USA it was propagated and sold under the cultivar name 'Mega Spunky Monkey' or simply 'Mega'.

It can be propagated with seeds between late winter and early spring, softwood cuttings or by division into multiple plants. It can be grown in water-retentive and/or well-drained soil, as long as the soil remains moist.

== Pests and diseases ==
This plant is prone to powdery mildews. Snails and slugs may also consume this plant.
