= Bill Akers =

American baseball player (1904–1962)

- Shortstop / Third baseman / Second baseman
- Born: December 25, 1904; Chattanooga, Tennessee, U.S.
- Died: April 12, 1962 (aged 57); Chattanooga, Tennessee, U.S.
- Batted: Right Threw: Right

MLB debut
- September 8, 1929, for the Detroit Tigers

Last MLB appearance
- July 27, 1932, for the Boston Braves

MLB statistics
- Batting average: .261
- On-base percentage: .349
- Home runs: 11
- Runs batted in: 69
- Stats at Baseball Reference

Teams
- Detroit Tigers (1929–1931); Boston Braves (1932)

William G. Akers (December 25, 1904 – April 12, 1962), nicknamed Bump, was an American professional baseball infielder and soldier.

Akers played baseball for 11 seasons from 1924 to 1934, including four seasons in Major League Baseball with the Detroit Tigers (1929–1931) and Boston Braves (1932). He had his best season in the majors was 1930 when he appeared in 85 games and compiled a .375 on-base percentage with eight doubles, five triples, nine home runs, and 40 RBIs. During his four years in the major leagues, he played as a shortstop (99 games), third baseman (46 games), and second baseman (seven games). He compiled a .261 career batting average with a .349 on-base percentage.

During his minor league career, he also played for the Durham Bulls (1926–1927), New Orleans Pelicans (1928), Decatur Commodores (1928), Beaumont Exporters (1929), Kansas City Blues (1931), Baltimore Orioles (1932–1933), and Little Rock Travelers (1933–1934).

Akers later became a motorcycle policeman with the Arkansas State Troopers and served in the United States Army during World War II. He sent 31 months in the Pacific theater of operations and received a Presidential citation with two oak leaf clusters and campaign ribbons with four battle stars.

== Early years ==
Akers was born in Chattanooga, Tennessee, in 1904.

== Professional baseball ==
=== Minor leagues ===
Akers began playing professional baseball in 1924 with the Chattanooga Lookouts of the Southern Association. He spent six years in the minors before making his major league debut, including stints with the Lookouts (1924), Jonesboro Buffaloes (1925), Danville Leafs (1926), Durham Bulls (1926–1927), New Orleans Pelicans (1928), Decatur Commodores (1928), and Beaumont Exporters (1929).

Playing for Decatur in the Three-Eye League during the 1928 season, he ranked high among the second basemen with a .956 fielding percentage. He developed a reputation in Decatur as "a steady fielder with a shotgun arm and a fair batting average." In January 1929, he was sold to the Beaumont Exporters of the Texas League. He had an outstanding season at Beaumont, batting .309 with 35 doubles, six triples, and 17 home runs.

=== Detroit Tigers ===
In early September 1929, the Detroit Tigers purchased Akers from Beaumont for $10,000 and two players. He appeared in 29 games for the 1929 Tigers, including 24 as the team's starting shortstop, and compiled a .265 batting average and .351 on-base percentage with two doubles, a triple, a home run, nine RBIs, and a stolen base. He also started four double plays in a single game on September 22, 1929.

Akers spent the entire season with the 1930 Tigers, appearing in 85 games, including 46 as the team's starting shortstop and 17 as the starting third baseman. He compiled a .279 batting average and .375 on-base percentage with eight doubles, five triples, nine home runs, and 40 RBIs in 233 at bats. He also participated in 43 double plays, often connecting with Detroit second baseman Charlie Gehringer. At the end of the 1930 season, Akers was rated as "the best man Detroit has had at the position [shortstop] since Jackie Tavener was at his best."

Akers returned to the Tigers in 1931, but appeared in only 29 games (16 as the starting shortstop) as Billy Rogell emerged as the club's starting shortstop. With limited playing time, Akers' batting averaged dropped by almost 100 points to .197. He was remembered in Detroit for two memorable plays. The first involved a defensive lapse in which he lost a fly ball in the sun after incorrectly following the shadow of a pigeon flying overhead. The second was his bunt which ended in a triple play and his destruction of the water cooler upon returning to the dugout. One Detroit sports writer later described Akers as "one of the daffiest characters ever to be in baseball." Akers also reportedly set a record for "the longest thrown in baseball, 510 feet."

=== Kansas City and Boston ===
On June 11, 1931, Akers was traded by the Tigers to the Kansas City Blues of the American Association in exchange for L. Brower. Akers appeared in 119 games for Kansas City (109 at shortstop) and compiled a career-high .331 batting average with 34 doubles, seven triples, and 20 home runs.

On November 17, 1931, the Boston Braves purchased Akers from Kansas City. He appeared in 36 games for the 1932 Braves, 21 as the starting third baseman and three as the starting shortstop, and compiled a .258 batting average and .330 on-base percentage. He appeared in his final major league game on July 27, 1932

In four seasons in the major leagues, Akers appeared in 174 games and hit .261 with 124 hits, 69 runs batted in (RBIs), 37 extra base hits, 63 bases on balls, a .349 on-base percentage, and a .409 slugging percentage. He played 99 games at shortstop, 46 games at third base, and seven games at second base.

=== Baltimore and Little Rock ===
On August 5, 1932, Akers was traded by the Braves with Bruce Cunningham and Bill McAfee to the Baltimore Orioles of the International League in exchange for Buck Jordan. He played third base for the Orioles, appeared in 45 games, and hit .301 with a .438 slugging percentage.

Akers began the 1933 season with Baltimore. He was traded by Baltimore to the Little Rock Travelers in June 1933 in exchange for George Redfern. Akers played 125 games at shortstop for Little Rock during the 1933 and 1934 seasons.

== Later years ==
After retiring from baseball in 1934, he became a motorcycle policeman with the Arkansas State Troopers. In 1936, he moved to Chicago where he worked for the state attorney's office.

In July 1940, Akers enlisted in the U.S. Army Air Corps and was initially assigned to duty as a mechanic with the Thirty-Ninth Pursuit Squadron at Selfridge Field. During World War II, he was stationed in the Pacific theater of operations with the 32nd Infantry Division. He served a total of 31 months in the Pacific and received a Presidential citation with two oak leaf clusters and campaign ribbons with four battle stars.

He died from liver cancer in 1962 at age 57 in Chattanooga. He was buried at Chattanooga National Cemetery.
