= Mark Koenig =

American baseball player (1904–1993)

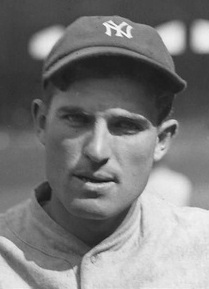
- Koenig, c. 1928
- Shortstop
- Born: July 19, 1904; San Francisco, California, U.S.
- Died: April 22, 1993 (aged 88); Willows, California, U.S.
- Batted: Switch Threw: Right

MLB debut
- September 8, 1925, for the New York Yankees

Last MLB appearance
- September 27, 1936, for the New York Giants

MLB statistics
- Batting average: .279
- Hits: 1,190
- Runs batted in: 446
- Stats at Baseball Reference

Teams
- New York Yankees (1925–1930); Detroit Tigers (1930–1931); Chicago Cubs (1932–1933); Cincinnati Reds (1934); New York Giants (1935–1936)

Career highlights and awards
- 2× World Series champion (1927, 1928)

Mark Anthony Koenig (July 19, 1904 – April 22, 1993) was an American baseball shortstop who played twelve seasons in Major League Baseball (MLB). He played with the New York Yankees, Detroit Tigers, Chicago Cubs, Cincinnati Reds and New York Giants from 1925 to 1936. A switch hitter who threw right-handed, he was listed at 6 feet 0 inches (1.83 m) and 180 pounds (82 kg). Although primarily playing as a shortstop, Koenig was utilized at both second base and third base as well.

Koenig played minor league baseball with four different teams until May 1925, when he signed with the New York Yankees. After making his debut in September 1925 and spending five seasons with the Yankees, he was traded to the Detroit Tigers, where he spent the next two seasons. He subsequently joined the Chicago Cubs and the Cincinnati Reds via trades in 1932 and 1934, respectively, and was finally traded to the New York Giants, with whom he played his last game on September 27, 1936. Koenig is most famous for being the last surviving member of the Murderers' Row.

== Early life ==
Koenig was born on July 19, 1904, in San Francisco. His father, Charles Koenig, and paternal grandfather William were both bricklayers, with the latter having immigrated from Germany to the United States. His mother Stella was of Swiss descent. Koenig had two brothers and a sister, and, during his childhood, he first met and played baseball with fellow San Franciscan and future teammate Tony Lazzeri. He attended Lowell High School in his hometown, but dropped out at the age of 16 in order to pursue a career in baseball. His high school eventually bestowed upon him his diploma in 1988. Koenig, who was 83 at the time, described the honor as a complete surprise.

== Professional career ==
=== Minor leagues ===
Koenig first started playing organized baseball on the Moose Jaw Millers team in the Western Canada League. It was here he was first spotted by Bob Connery, a scout who worked for the New York Yankees organization. After the league collapsed in the middle of the season, he proceeded to play with the St. Paul Saints, a minor league baseball team which competed in the American Association. He spent nearly the next four seasons with the team; during this time, he had brief sojourns with the Jamestown Jinkotans and the Des Moines Boosters in order to garner more playing experience.

Koenig returned to St. Paul in 1924 and though he spent the entire season with the team, he played just 68 games for them. At the end of the season, the Saints advanced to the Little World Series, where they faced the International League's Baltimore Orioles. Having had limited playing time, it was in Game 5 where he finally had the opportunity to prove himself. Danny Boone, St. Paul's starting shortstop, injured his ankle during batting practice. Although the rules at the time stipulated the Saints could temporarily utilize a player from another American Association team to replace Boone, the Orioles objected and the National Association president ruled Koenig constituted an ample substitute for Boone. He proved to be exactly that when he scored the Saints' only run via a home run. He finished the Little World Series with a .429 batting average and 2 home runs, including one hit off Lefty Grove. His stellar performance in the series resulted in at least seven MLB teams seeking to acquire him in the offseason. However, he stayed with the Saints for the first part of the 1925 season before he was traded on May 29 to the New York Yankees in exchange for Fred Hofmann, Oscar Roettger, $50,000 ($917,932 in current dollar terms) and a player to be named later (Ernie Johnson).

=== New York Yankees (1925–1930) ===
Koenig made his major league debut for the Yankees on September 8, 1925, at the age of 21, entering the game as a defensive substitute for shortstop Pee-Wee Wanninger in a 5–4 win against the Boston Red Sox. During his rookie season the following year, he posted a batting average of .271 and struck out just 37 times in 617 at bats, a statistic which his manager Miller Huggins looked highly upon. Defensively, he committed the most errors among all fielders in the American League and most errors by a shortstop with 52. Nonetheless, he had the AL's third highest range factor at shortstop of 4.99 and made a league-leading 470 putouts. In the postseason, the Yankees advanced to the 1926 World Series, where they lost to the St. Louis Cardinals in seven games. In the crucial Game 7, Koenig made an error attempting to field a double play opportunity in the fourth inning. This eventually led to the Cardinals scoring what turned out to be the winning run in a 3–2 victory. Koenig was subsequently criticized by fans for being responsible for Yankees losing the game and, ultimately, the series.

Koenig was penciled into the two-hole spot in the Yankees' 1927 Opening Day lineup, with Earle Combs batting in front of him at leadoff and Babe Ruth, Lou Gehrig, Bob Meusel and Tony Lazzeri batting behind him. This lineup, which was utilized in that order throughout the majority of the season, was given the nickname "Murderers' Row". Many sports analysts, baseball writers and fans consider the 1927 team the greatest baseball team of all time. Although he was dismissive of the role he played, Koenig contributed to the team's success as he batted .285 and amassed 150 hits, 11 triples, 99 runs scored and 62 runs batted in. However, he once again led the league in errors with 47, but compensated for this by recording the highest range factor at shortstop (5.61) and third most assists at shortstop (423). He was also part of history when, after hitting a triple, he was the only Yankees' player on base when Babe Ruth set a new single-season record by hitting his milestone 60th home run. The Yankees advanced to the World Series that year, where they swept the Pittsburgh Pirates. Koenig performed impressively throughout the series, leading the team with a .500 batting average while committing no errors in 24 total chances.

=== Later career ===
On May 30, 1930, the Yankees traded Koenig and Waite Hoyt to the Detroit Tigers for Ownie Carroll, Harry Rice, and Yats Wuestling. Koenig went to the Cubs in 1932 with whom he returned to the World Series this time against the New York Yankees. It was news that the Cubs voted Koenig only a half share of the World Series bonus that led to hostility from his former team which continued over the course of the series famously culminating in Babe Ruth’s called shot home run.

=== Career statistics ===
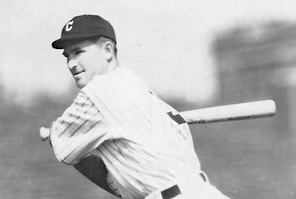
Mark Koenig as a member of the Chicago Cubs, circa 1932–33.

In 1162 games over 12 seasons, Koenig posted a .279 batting average (1190-for-4271) with 572 runs, 195 doubles, 49 triples, 28 home runs, 446 RBIs, 31 stolen bases, 222 bases on balls, .316 on-base percentage and .367 slugging percentage. He finished his career with a .933 fielding percentage playing primarily at shortstop, third and second base. In 20 World Series games, he batted .237 (18-for-76) with 9 runs, 3 doubles, 1 triple and 5 RBI.

== Personal life ==
In June 1928, Koenig became engaged to Katherine Tremaine, whom he married at the end of that year's baseball season. Together, they had one daughter, Gail, who was born in 1930. He later was remarried to Doris Bailey, who died in 1979. He appeared as himself in The Pride of the Yankees, an Academy Award-winning movie released in 1942 which paid tribute to his fellow Yankees teammate Lou Gehrig. After his baseball career ended, he settled back in his hometown and took up several jobs, namely owning gas stations and working as a brewer.

Beginning in 1982, Koenig's health began to deteriorate. In addition to the lung cancer which had developed as a three-pack-a-day smoker, he also suffered from gout, poor eyesight and back pain necessitating the use of a cane. Because of these ailments, he moved to Orland, California, in 1986 in order to live with his daughter and her family. He died of cancer on April 22, 1993, in Willows, California, at the age of 88 and was cremated. He had outlived his two wives and was survived by his daughter, five grandchildren and nine great-grandchildren. At the time of his death, he was the last surviving member of the 1927 New York Yankees starting lineup, nicknamed "Murderers' Row". He was also the last surviving member of the 1928 World Champion New York Yankees.
