= Royal Scottish Academy =

Art institution in Edinburgh, Scotland

- The Royal Scottish Academy of Art and Architecture

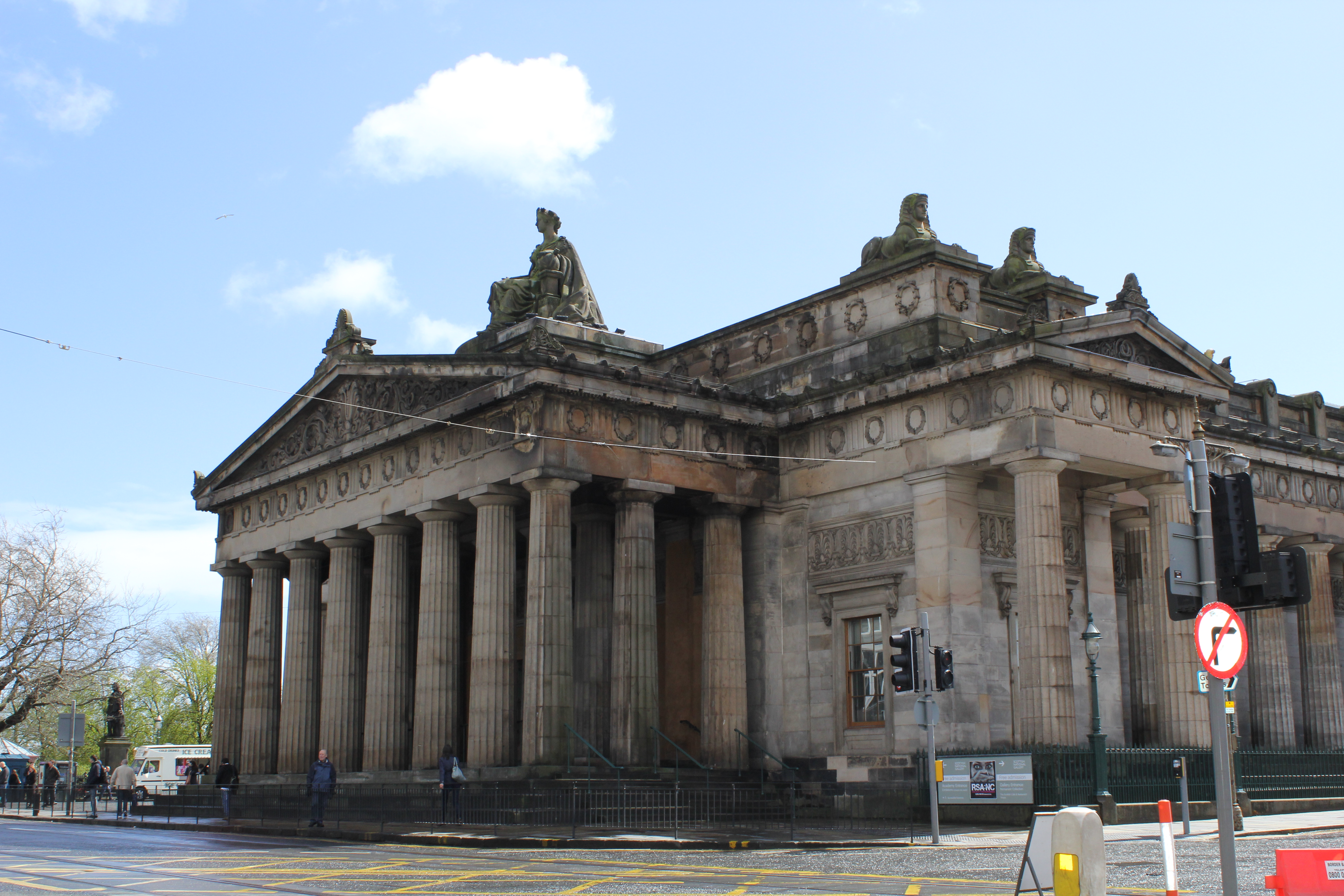
- The RSA Building on Princes Street, Edinburgh
- Abbreviation: RSA
- Formation: May 27, 1826; 200 years ago
- Founded at: Edinburgh
- Purpose: Supporting art and architecture in Scotland
- Headquarters: Royal Scottish Academy Building, The Mound, Edinburgh, EH2 2EL
- Location: Edinburgh, Scotland, UK
- Coordinates: 55.9517°N 3.1963°W
- Origins: Secession from the Royal Institution, 1826
- Region served: Scotland
- Fields: Fine Arts
- Director: Colin Greenslade
- President: Gareth Fisher
- Website: www.royalscottishacademy.org

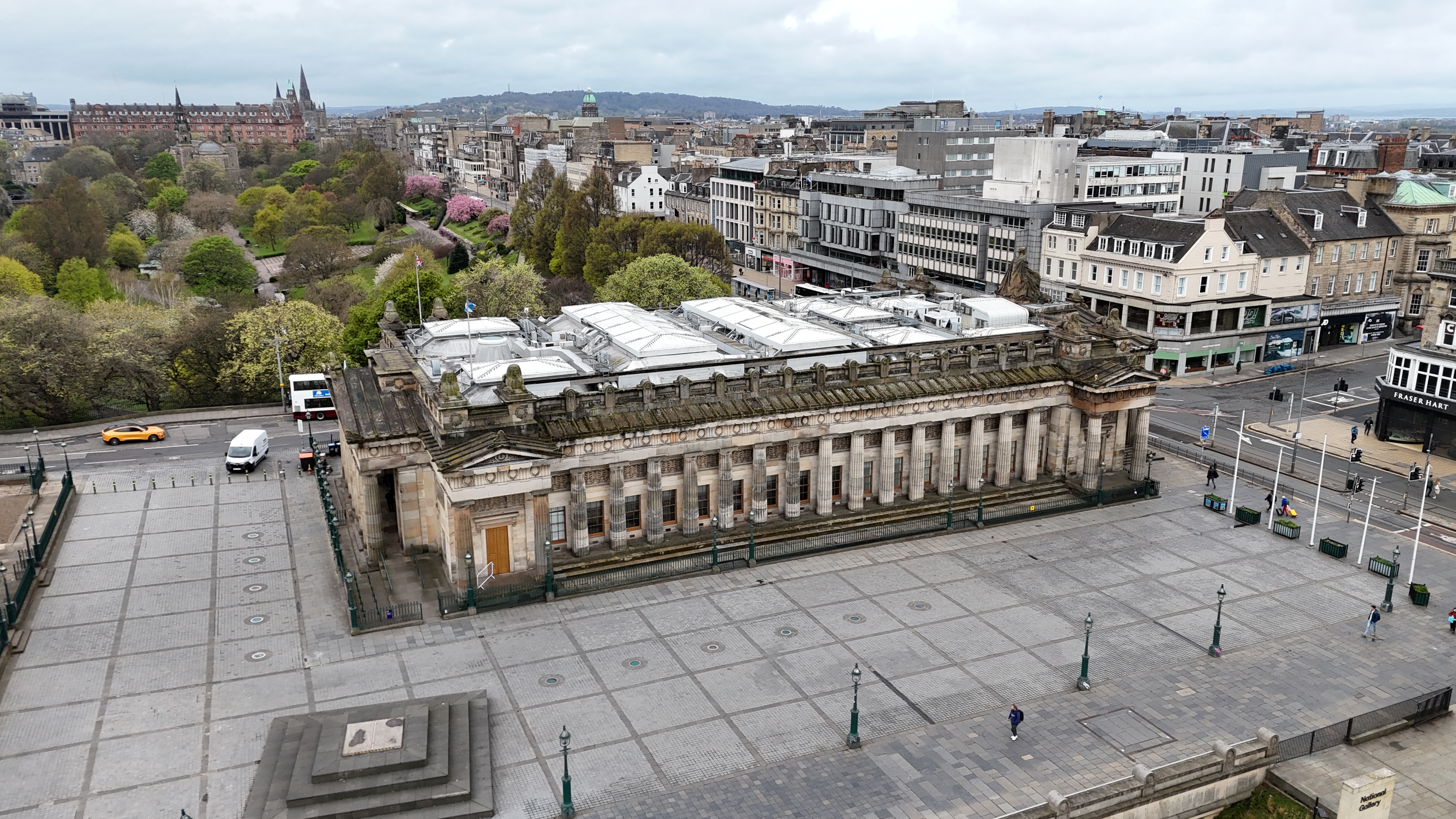
Aerial View of Royal Scottish Academy

The Royal Scottish Academy (RSA) is the country's national academy of art. It promotes contemporary Scottish art.

The Academy was founded in 1826 by eleven artists meeting in Edinburgh. Originally named the Scottish Academy, it became the Royal Scottish Academy on being granted a royal charter in 1838.

The RSA maintains a unique position in the country as an independently funded institution led by eminent artists and architects to promote and support the creation, understanding, and enjoyment of visual arts through exhibitions and related educational events.

== History ==
The Royal Institution for the Encouragement of the Fine Arts in Scotland (RI) was founded in 1819 with the aim of mounting exhibitions and promoting artistic appreciation in Scotland. The RI acquired artworks by contemporary Scottish artists as well as a number of Old Masters. A new building to house the exhibitions, the Royal Institution designed by the noted Scottish architect William Henry Playfair, was erected in Edinburgh at the junction of The Mound and Princes Street. The RI shared the premises with other cultural organisations, the Royal Society of Edinburgh, and a museum of the Society of Antiquaries of Scotland.

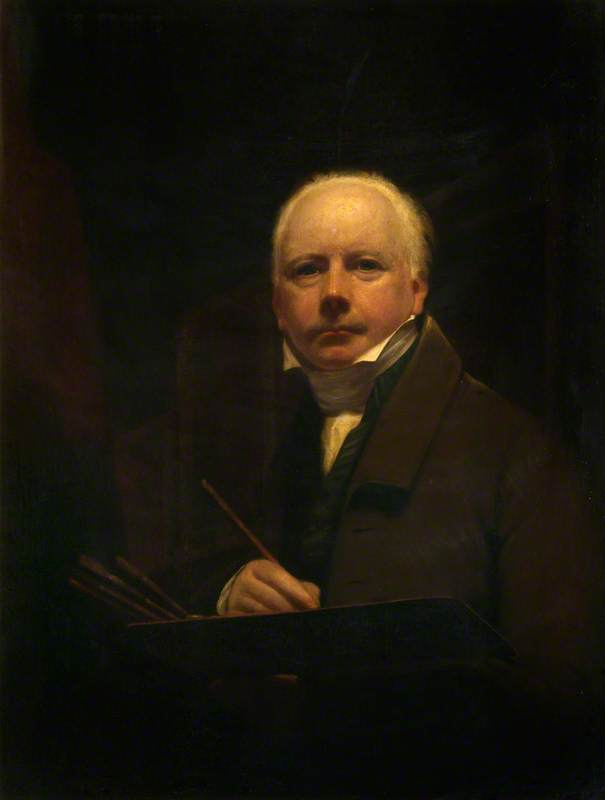
First President of the Scottish Academy, George Watson (1767-1837)

Disagreements grew in the artists' community, and many considered the RI to be too elitist. In 1826, a group of artists broke away from the Royal Institution and took the name of the Scottish Academy of Painting, Sculpture, and Architecture. The inaugural meeting was held on 27 May 1826 at Stewart's Rooms on Waterloo Bridge, Edinburgh, attended by 13 founding Academicians — 11 painters, one architect and one sculptor. The first president was George Watson, who served until 1837. Its aims were to hold an annual exhibition, open to all artists of merit; to provide free education for artists by founding an academy of fine arts; to build a collection of artworks and a fine arts library; and to provide financial support to less fortunate artists. The RSA's first Annual Exhibition was held in the rented rooms at 24 Waterloo Place. From 1835, the group leased gallery space in the Royal Institution building to mount exhibitions of its growing art collection, and in 1838 the group received a royal charter and became the Royal Scottish Academy (RSA).

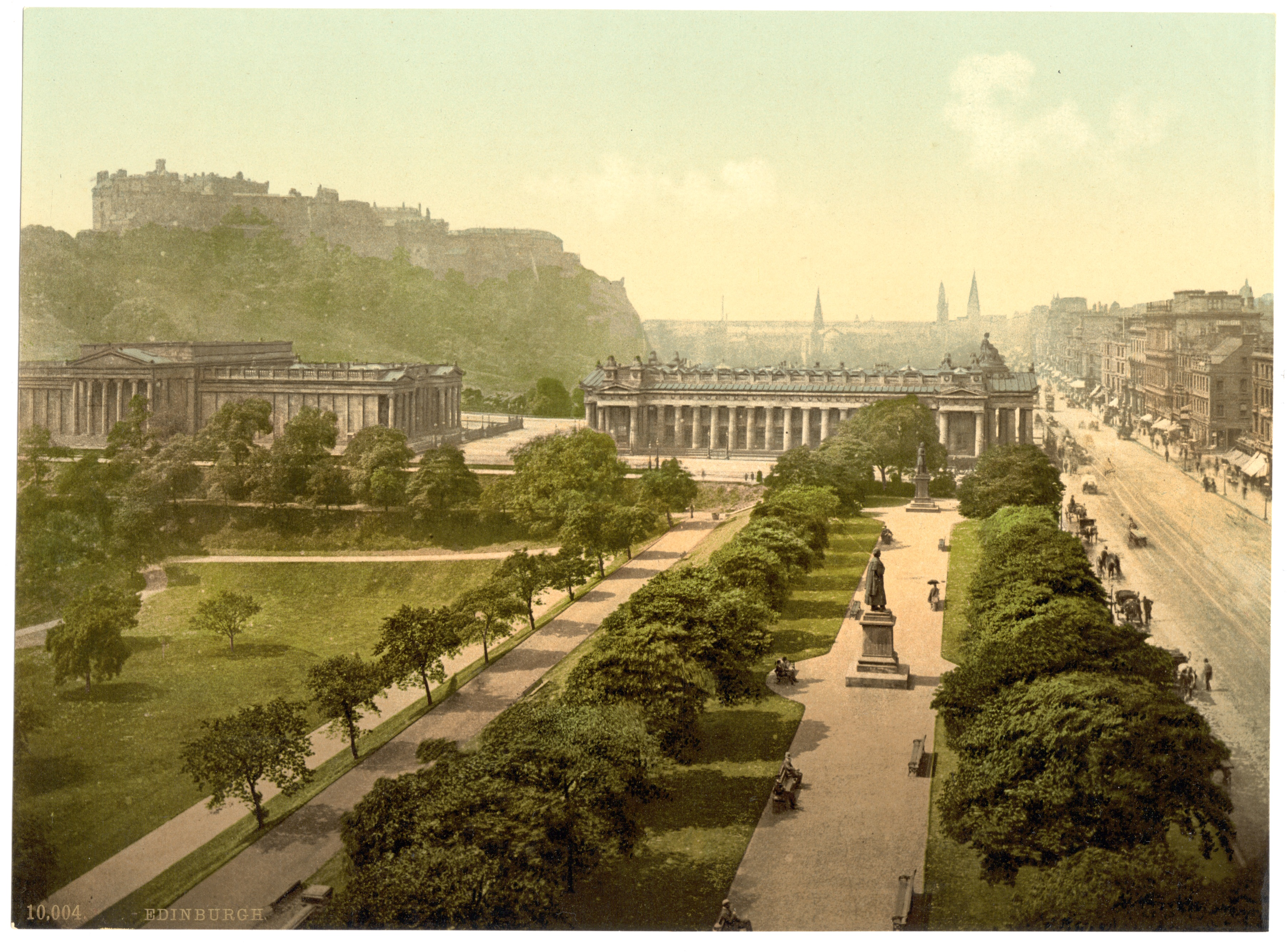
The RSA was formerly housed in the National Gallery of Scotland (left) until it moved to the Royal Institution building (right) in 1911

One of the key aims of the RSA was to found a national art gallery for Scotland, and this was realised in 1859, when a new gallery building was built by Playfair, the National Gallery of Scotland, adjacent to the RI building. The building housed RI's collection of Old Master paintings along with the RSA collection. The RSA continued to share space in the National Gallery building until 1911.

At the turn of the 19th and 20th centuries, the arts organisations relocated; the Society of Antiquaries moved its museum to new premises on Queen Street (the building that now houses the Scottish National Portrait Gallery), while the Royal Society moved to 22-24 George Street, and in 1907, the Royal Institution moved to the new Edinburgh College of Art. In 1911, the RSA was granted permanent tenancy of the old RI building and the right to hold its annual exhibition there. The building became known as the Royal Scottish Academy, a name it retains to this day.

== Activities ==
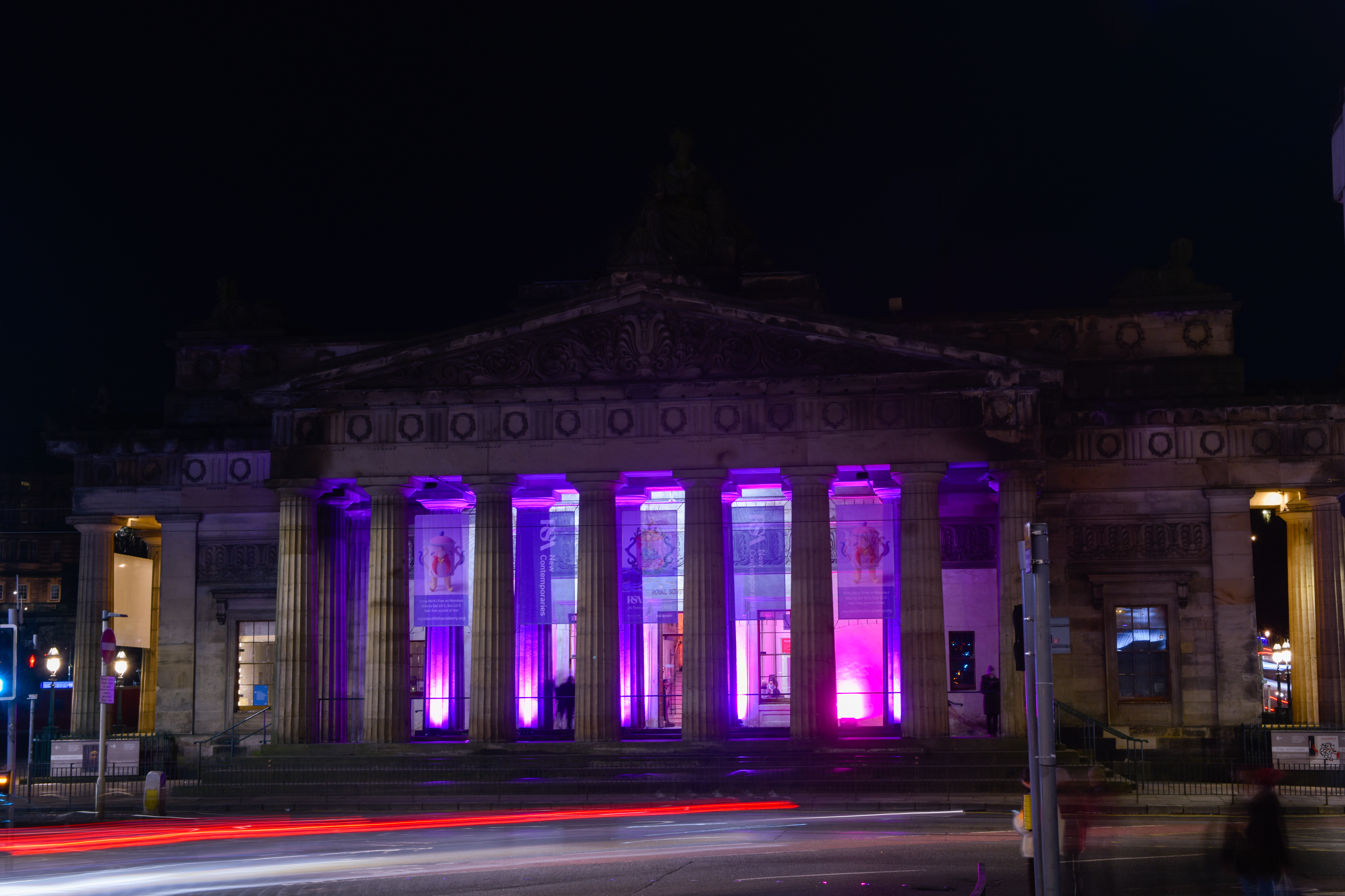
The RSA New Contemporaries Exhibition, 2022

In addition to a continuous programme of exhibitions, the RSA also administers scholarships, awards, and residencies for artists who live and work in Scotland. The RSA's historic collection of important artworks and an extensive archive of related material chronicling art and architecture in Scotland over the last 180 years are housed in the National Museums Collection Centre at Granton, and are available to researchers by appointment. Displays of the historic collections are mounted whenever possible.

The most famous award the Royal Scottish Academy administers is the Guthrie Award which goes out to Scottish-based artists annually, since 1920, but there are many others like the Keith Award, the Latimer Award and the architecture awards, as well as external awards which it presents.

== Building ==
The RSA's home since 1911 has been the Royal Scottish Academy Building at the junction of The Mound and Princes Street in Edinburgh, adjacent to the National Gallery of Scotland building. The RSA building is managed by National Galleries Scotland but the 1910 Order grants the RSA permanent administration offices in the building. Exhibition space is shared throughout the year with the Scottish National Gallery and other organisations (Exhibiting Societies of Scottish Artists). The building, originally designed by William Henry Playfair, was recently refurbished as part of the Playfair Project and is now part of the Scottish National Gallery complex.

== Academicians ==
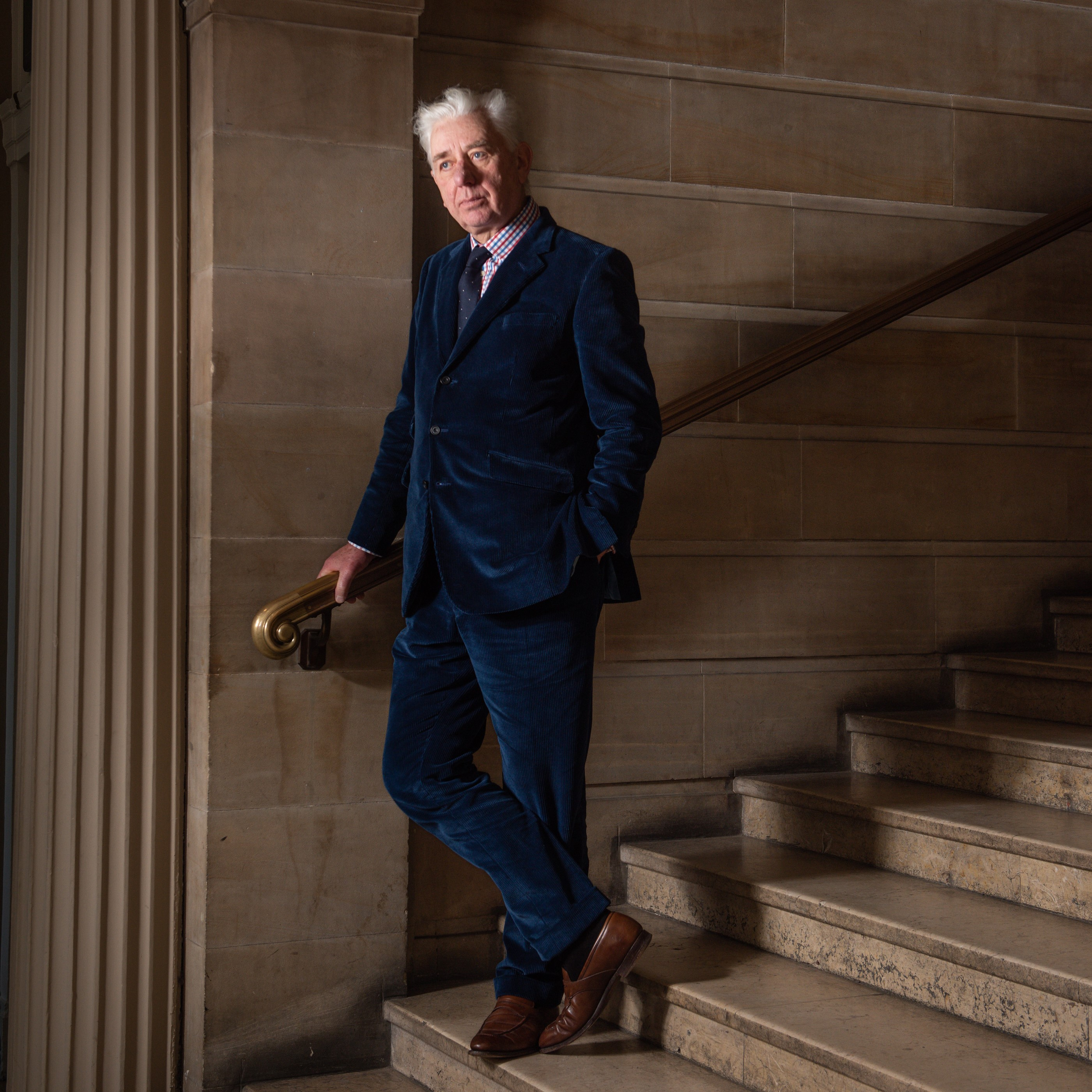
RSA President Gareth Fisher

The RSA is led by a body of eminent artist and architect members who encompass a broad cross-section of contemporary Scottish art. Members are known as Academicians, and are entitled to use the post-nominal letters RSA. The president uses the postnominal letters PRSA while in office, and PPRSA (Past President of the RSA) thereafter.

Academicians are elected to the Academy by their peers. There are also Honorary Academicians (HRSA). After amendments to the Supplementary Charter in 2005, once Associates (ARSA) have submitted a Diploma work into the Permanent Collection of the RSA, they are then entitled to full membership of the Academy. The membership includes 30 Honorary Academicians and 104 Academicians. From 2010–12, the RSA President was Professor Bill Scott, Secretary Arthur Watson and Treasurer Professor Ian Howard. In 2018, Joyce W. Cairns was elected as the first female President in the history of the Academy. Current RSA President Gareth Fisher is joined by Secretary Edward Summerton RSA and Treasurer Jo Ganter RSA.

== Past Presidents ==
- 2022–present: Gareth Fisher
- 2018–2022: Joyce W. Cairns
- 2012–2018: Arthur Watson
- 2007–2012: Bill Scott
- 1998–2007: Ian McKenzie-Smith
- 1990–1998: William James Laidlaw Baillie
- 1983–1990: Sir Anthony Wheeler
- 1973–1983: Sir Robin Philipson
- 1969–1973: Sir William Kininmonth
- 1959–1969: Sir William MacTaggart
- 1950–1959: William Oliphant Hutchison
- 1944–1950: Sir Frank Mears
- 1933–1944: Sir George Pirie
- 1923–1933: Sir George Washington Browne
- 1919–1923: Sir James Lawton Wingate
- 1902–1919: Sir James Guthrie
- 1891–1902: Sir George Reid
- 1882–1891: Sir William Fettes Douglas
- 1876–1882: Sir Daniel Macnee
- 1864–1876: Sir George Harvey
- 1850–1864: Sir John Watson Gordon
- 1837–1850: Sir William Allan
- 1826–1837: George Watson (first president)

== See also ==
- Royal Society of Edinburgh
- Royal Academy of Arts
- Royal Society of Arts
- Royal West of England Academy
- John James Bannatyne
