= Harry Rice =

American baseball player (1901–1971)

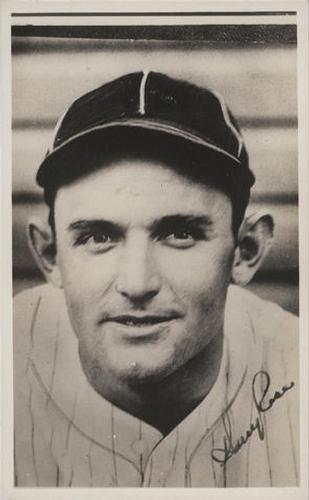
- Outfielder
- Born: November 22, 1901; Ware Station, Illinois, U.S.
- Died: January 1, 1971 (aged 69); Portland, Oregon, U.S.
- Batted: Left Threw: Right

MLB debut
- April 18, 1923, for the St. Louis Browns

Last MLB appearance
- October 1, 1933, for the Cincinnati Reds

MLB statistics
- Batting average: .299
- Home runs: 48
- Runs batted in: 501
- Stats at Baseball Reference

Teams
- St. Louis Browns (1923–1927); Detroit Tigers (1928–1930); New York Yankees (1930); Washington Senators (1931); Cincinnati Reds (1933)

Harry Francis Rice (November 22, 1901 – January 1, 1971) was an American outfielder for the St. Louis Browns (1923–27), Detroit Tigers (1928–30), New York Yankees (1930), Washington Senators (1931) and Cincinnati Reds (1933).

== Career ==
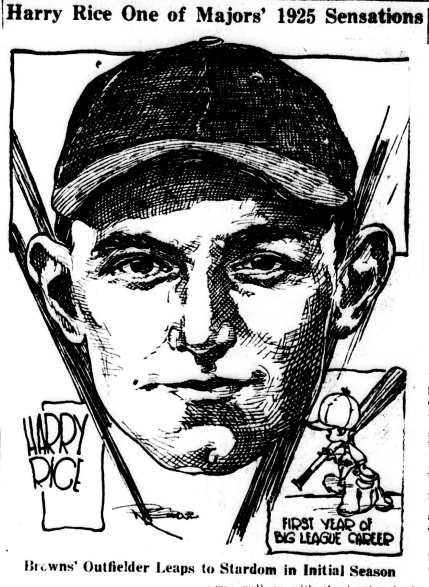
A newspaper drawing of Rice in 1925

At his peak, he was a highly regarded Major League Baseball player. He broke into the big leagues with the St. Louis Browns, located just a few hours from his home in southern Illinois, making it possible for family to occasionally travel to watch him play. Rice hailed from near the town of Ware, Illinois. His hometown is often listed as Ware Station, Illinois. He attended Mound City High School in Mound City, Illinois.

Rice made his big league debut on April 18, 1923. He joined the St. Louis Browns at a time of high expectations. After a stellar performance by the 1922 Browns and with star player and future Hall of Famer George Sisler, their owner predicted a World Series would soon come to Sportsman’s Park. Seating capacity was increased by almost one-third. Rice’s arrival was important as Sisler was forced to miss the entire 1923 season due to double vision resulting from sinusitis. Rice’s batting average of .359 for the Browns in 1925 was the sixth-best in the American League that season, and Rice placed fifth in the voting for the league's Most Valuable Player. He enjoyed another good season and received MVP consideration in 1926, ending with a .313 average and a career-best 181 hits. Sportsman’s did host a World Series in 1926, but it was the Browns’ tenants, the upstart St. Louis Cardinals who beat the Yankees and captured their first World Series title. Rice had another solid season for the Browns in 1927 before being traded to Detroit in December 1927. In 1928, he hit .302 and had a career best 20 stolen bases for the Tigers. His .304 average and 69 RBI in 1929 again earned some MVP consideration.

On May 30, 1930, the Tigers traded Rice, Ownie Carroll, and Yats Wuestling to the New York Yankees for Waite Hoyt and Mark Koenig. He formed part of a formidable outfield that also included future Hall of Famers Babe Ruth and Earle Combs. The 1930 season turned out to be Rice's only year as a Yankee. He appeared in 100 games, batting .298 with 74 RBI in a lineup that also included Lou Gehrig. Rice appeared in 47 games for the Washington Senators in 1931 and did not appear in the majors in 1932. His last Major League season was in 1933 with the Cincinnati Reds.

St. Louis sportswriter Bob Broeg recalled Rice as a premier defender with a very strong throwing arm. He was predominantly an outfielder, appearing in over 7,800 innings in the outfield, usually in center or right field. However, Rice has the rare distinction of playing every position, except pitcher, during his career. Yankees historians recall Rice’s defense as an opposing player from a play in 1931 that turned a Gehrig home run into a triple in the record books. With a runner on base, Gehrig homered to center field. The ball caromed back so quickly to Rice, playing outfield for the Washington Senators, that the baserunner, Lyn Lary, mistakenly thought Rice had caught it. Lary ran to the dugout instead of crossing home plate. Gehrig was awarded a triple instead of a home run.

Over 10 seasons, Rice's offensive statistics were: 1,034 Games, 3,740 At Bats, 620 Runs, 1,118 Hits, 186 Doubles, 63 Triples, 48 Home Runs, 501 RBI, 59 Stolen Bases, 376 Walks, .299 Batting Average, .368 On-base percentage, .421 Slugging Percentage, 1,574 Total Bases and 99 Sacrifice Hits. He hit .300 or better five times in his major league career.

== Later life ==
Rice died in Portland, Oregon at the age of 69.
