= George Watson (painter) =

Scottish painter (1766–1837)

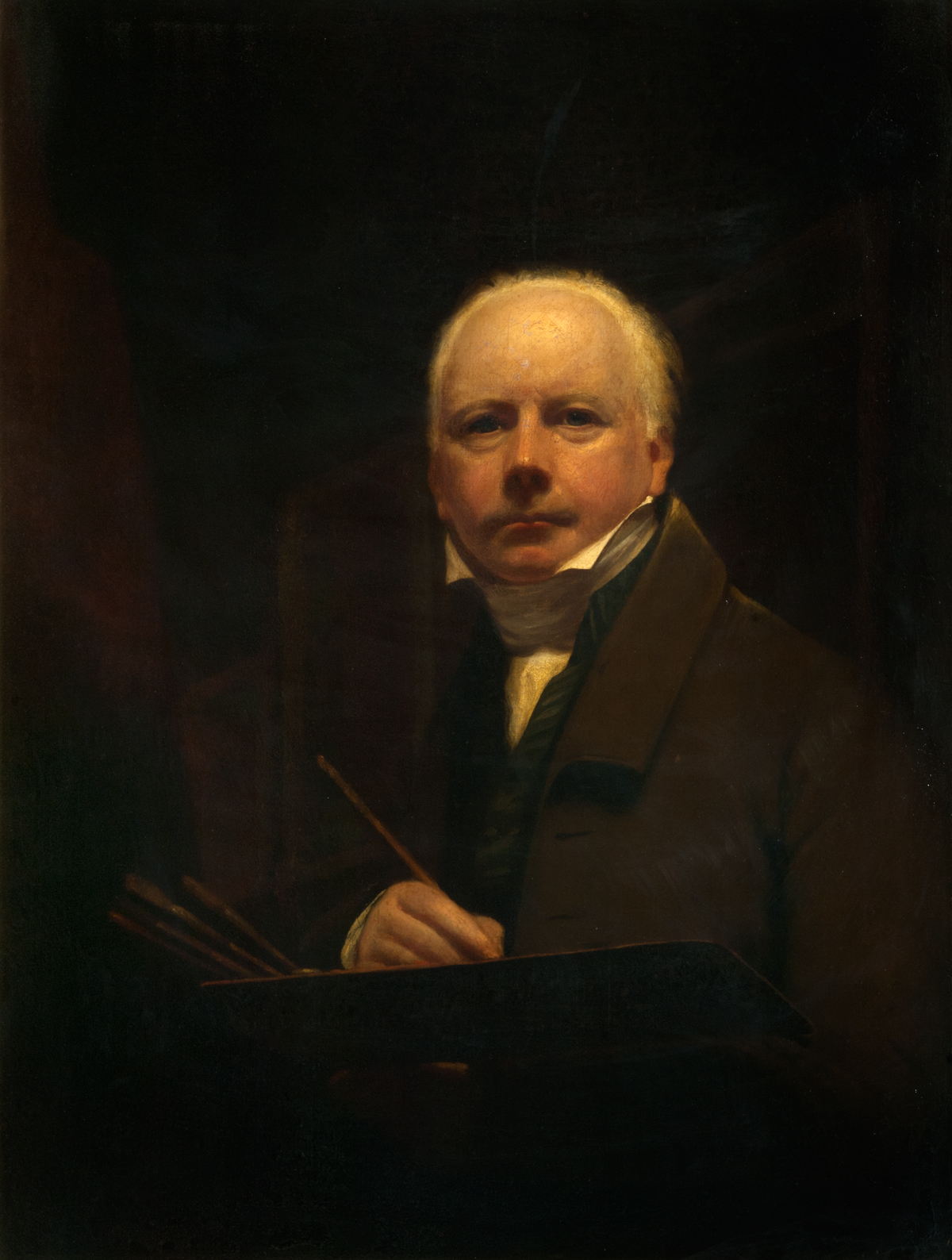
- Self-portrait, c. 1816
- Born: 20 October 1766; Overmains, Berwickshire
- Died: 24 August 1837 (aged 70); Edinburgh, Scotland

George Watson, PPRSA (20 October 1766 – 24 August 1837) was a Scottish painter who specialised in portrait painting and served the first president of the Royal Scottish Academy.

== Life and work ==
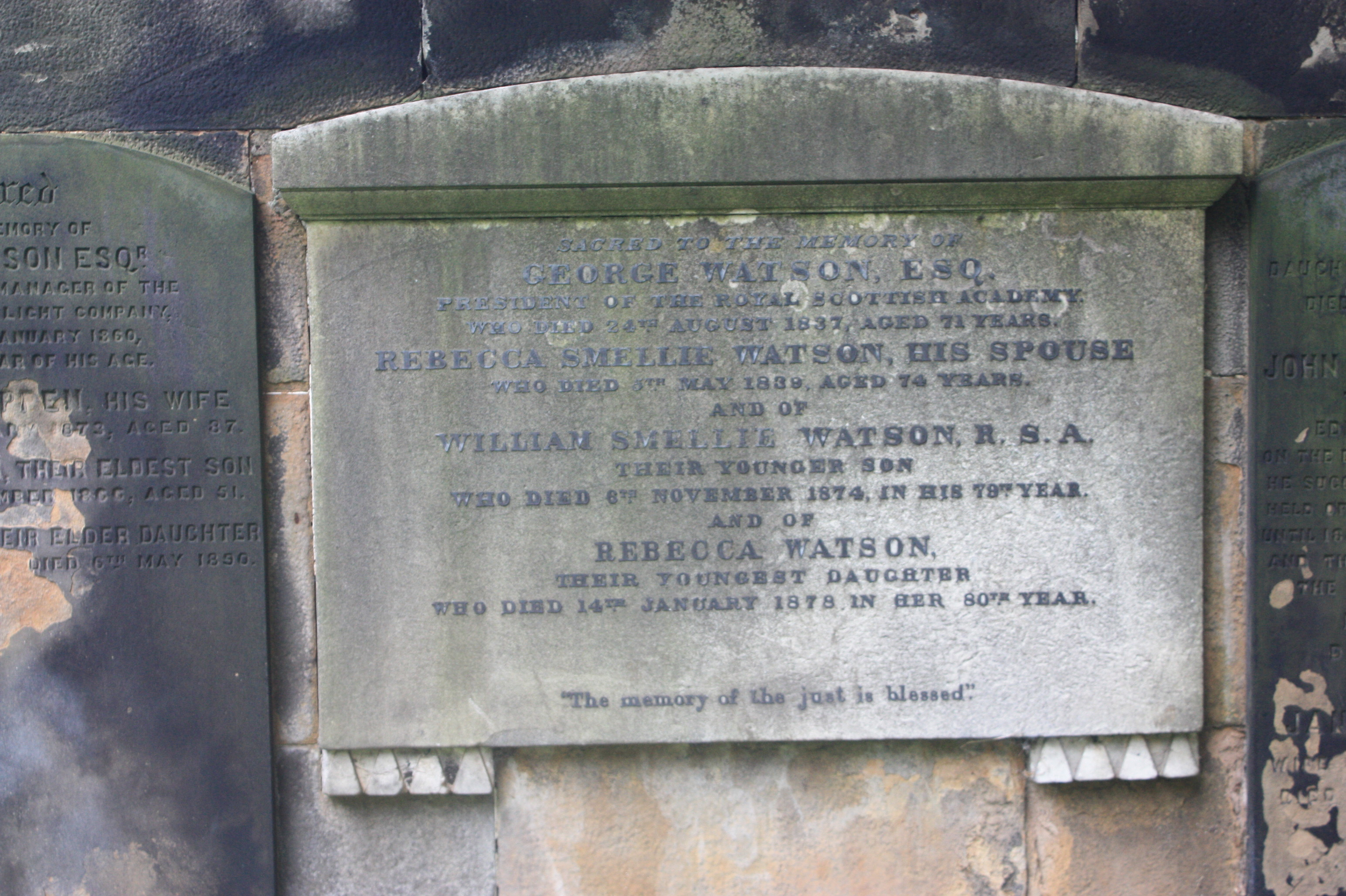
Watson's grave in the graveyard of St Cuthbert's Church, Edinburgh

Watson was born in Overmains, Berwickshire, on 20 October 1766, the son of John Watson and Frances Veitch of Elliott. John Watson. He received his early education in Edinburgh, and got some instruction in painting from Alexander Nasmyth but when 18 years of age he went to London with an introduction to Joshua Reynolds, who received him as a pupil. After two years spent in Reynolds' studio, he returned to Edinburgh, and established himself as a portrait-painter.

In 1808, he was associated with other painters in starting a society of artists, which, however, only lasted a few years. He exhibited frequently at the Royal Academy and the British Institution, and about 1815 was invited to London to paint a number of portraits, including those of the dean of Canterbury and Benjamin West. In 1820, in spite of much opposition from the Royal Institution, the Scottish Academy was founded, and Watson, who had been president of the previous society, was elected to the same office in the new one, the ultimate success of which was largely due to his tact and ability. He continued as president until his death, the academy receiving its royal charter a few months afterwards.

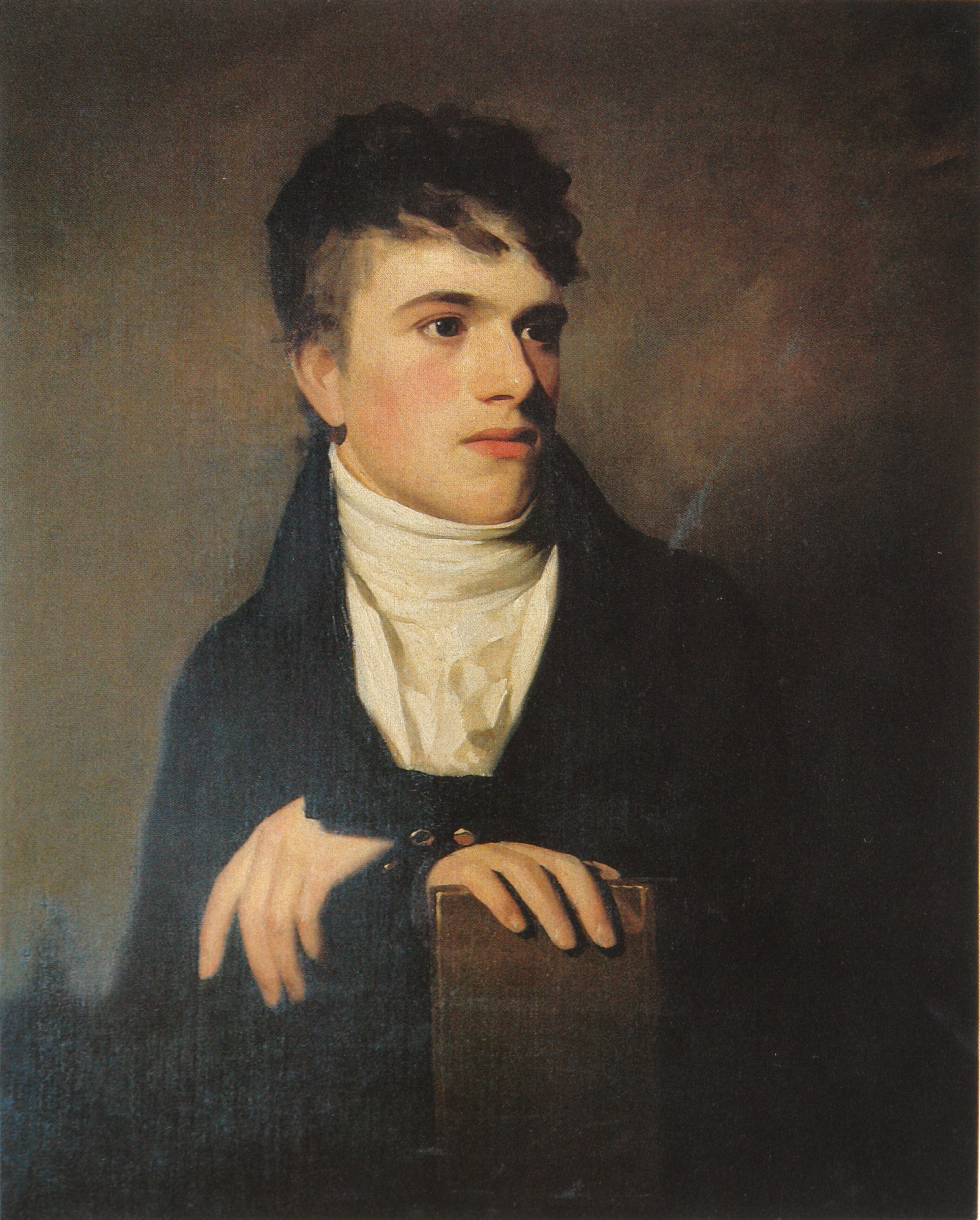
John James Ruskin - father of John Ruskin (1802)

It is said that he long maintained an honourable rivalry with Henry Raeburn but, although his grasp of character was firm, his executive power considerable, and his work belonged to a fine convention, his portraiture lacks the qualities which give that of his fellow artist enduring interest. He is represented in the National Gallery of Scotland by portraits of two brother artists, Benjamin West and two of Archibald Skirving; and in the Scottish Portrait Gallery by a number of portraits, including one of himself, and one of William Smellie, which some consider his best piece of work.

Shortly after his return from his first visit to London he married Rebecca Smellie, daughter of William Smellie, printer and naturalist, who, with five children, survived him.

Watson died at home, 10 Forth Street in Edinburgh on 24 August 1837. He is buried on the southern wall of St Cuthberts Churchyard in Edinburgh. His nephew John Kippen Watson FRSE lies with him.

== Family ==
His son, William Smellie Watson RSA (1796–1874), was born in Edinburgh, and, like his father and his cousin, Sir John Watson Gordon became a portrait-painter. He was a pupil of his father's, studied at the Trustees' Academy, and from 1815, for five years, in the schools of the London Royal Academy, and worked for a year with Sir David Wilkie while that artist was painting The Penny Wedding and other pictures. Returning to Edinburgh, he made a good connection as a portrait-painter, became one of the founders of the Scottish Academy, and for nearly 50years exhibited with unfailing regularity. He solely confined himself to portraiture.

He died in Edinburgh on 6 November 1874. He is buried with his parents in St Cuthberts.

He was a devoted student of natural history, particularly ornithology, and formed an extensive collection of specimens, which he bequeathed the University of Edinburgh. Watson has over 35 paintings in public collections in Britain.
