= John James Bannatyne =

Scottish painter and watercolourist

John James Bannatyne RSW (1832 – 7 September 1911) was a late 19th and early 20th century Scottish painter and watercolourist specialising in Highland landscapes and seascapes.

== Life ==
John James Bannatyne was born in 1832 in Glasgow. to John Bannatyne, a mercantile clerk, and Isabella Bannatyne (née Kelly).

His career, prior to becoming an artist, was as a designer with the calico printing company, Dalglish, Falconer & Co Ltd.

An article in The Scotsman, written on his death in 1911 states:

"Mr Bannatyne...began his career as a designer in Glasgow, but taking up art, he went to London, exhibiting many water-colours at the Royal Academy and other exhibitions. Later he worked in oils. Most of his pictures were landscapes and he found his subjects as a rule on the West Coast and in the Western Highlands. He returned to Glasgow twenty-one years ago. Mr Bannatyne was an original member of the Royal Scottish Society of Painters in Water Colours and joined the Royal Glasgow Institute of the Fine Arts and the Art Club."

He exhibited extensively. His works were exhibited at the Royal Academy (5) from 1869 to 1886 and Royal Scottish Academy(28) from 1861 to 1897. He also exhibited at the Royal Scottish Society of Painters in Watercolours(70), Royal Institute of Oil Painters(10), Royal Institute of Painters in Watercolours(13), Royal Society of British Artists(9), Royal Glasgow Institute of the Fine Arts (84).

Bannatyne’s painting was influenced by the Pre-Raphaelite movement. At his best, his painting was regarded as presenting delicate views of the Highlands with good effects of sunsets and moonlight, often reflected in water.

He was elected to Royal Scottish Society of Painters in Watercolours in 1878

He wed late in life, marrying Catherine Semple (née Burns) in 1905 in Glasgow.

He died at the Gatehouse, Loch an Eilein, Rothiemurchus on 7 September 1911 and is buried in Cathcart Cemetery, Glasgow.

Fellow Glasgow artist John Henderson (painter) was appointed a Trustee of Bannatyne's will. Both John Henderson and his brother, Joseph Morris Henderson were among the main beneficiaries of the will

== Known works ==
- Misty Day, Sound of Kilbrannon Rozelle House Galleries, Ayr
- Lochranza, Isle of Arran Gracefield Arts Centre, Dumfries
