= Yats Wuestling =

American baseball player (1903–1970)

- Shortstop
- Born: October 18, 1903; St. Louis, Missouri, US
- Died: April 26, 1970 (aged 66); St. Louis, Missouri, US
- Batted: Right Threw: Right

MLB debut
- June 25, 1929, for the Detroit Tigers

Last MLB appearance
- September 28, 1930, for the New York Yankees

MLB statistics
- Batting average: .189
- Home runs: 0
- Runs batted in: 19
- Stats at Baseball Reference

Teams
- Detroit Tigers (1929–1930); New York Yankees (1930)

George Wuestling (October 18, 1903 – April 26, 1970), sometimes referred to as "Yats" or "Yatz", was an American baseball player. A native of St. Louis, Missouri, he played professional baseball, primarily as a shortstop, from 1924 to 1934, including two seasons in Major League Baseball with the Detroit Tigers in 1929 and 1930 and with the New York Yankees in 1930. He compiled a .189 batting average in 83 major league games. He also played several years in the minor leagues, including three years for the Terre Haute Tots from 1925 to 1927 and three years for the Portland Beavers in 1928, 1929 and 1931.

== Early years ==
Wuestling was born in St. Louis, Missouri, in 1903.

== Professional baseball ==
Wuestling began playing professional baseball with a team in Independence, Missouri. In 1924, he played for the Arkansas City Osages of the Southwestern League. He compiled a .284 batting average in 128 games for Arkansas City. He then spent three years from 1925 to 1927 with the Terre Haute Tots in the Three-Eye League, compiling batting averages of .275 in 1925, .244 in 1926, and .284 in 1927.

He was sold by Terre Haute to a New Orleans team, but he quit because of the hot Louisiana weather. He next joined the Portland Beavers of the Pacific Coast League for the 1928 and 1929 seasons. He appeared in 105 games for Portland in 1928, all at shortstop, and compiled a .268 batting average.

In June 1929, with Yuestling batting .252, Portland sold Yuestling to the Detroit Tigers. He appeared in 54 games for the 1929 Tigers, 43 of them as the team's starting shortstop, and compiled a .200 batting average.

Yuestling began the 1930 season with the Tigers. He appeared in only four games for the 1930 Tigers and failed to hit in nine at bats. On May 30, 1930, Yuestling was part of a multiplayer deal that sent Carroll, Ownie Carroll and Harry Rice to the New York Yankees in exchange for Waite Hoyt and Mark Koenig. Wuestling appeared in 25 games for the Yankees, 14 as the team's starting shortstop, and compiled a .190 batting average. He appeared in his last major league game on September 28, 1930.

In two major league seasons, Wuestling appeared in 83 major league games, 77 at shortstop. He was a career .189 hitter.

Although his major league career ended in 1930, Wuestling continued to play in the minor leagues. He was purchased from the Yankees by the Portland club on November 29, 1930, and appeared in 167 games for the Beavers in 1931. He concluded his playing career with the Memphis Chickasaws of the Southern Association in 1932, the Burkes of the University City MUNY League in 1933, and the Omaha Packers of the Western League in 1934.

== Later years ==
Wuestling died of a heart attack in 1970 in St. Louis at age 66. He was survived by his wife Elizabeth (Rayno) Wuestling and their son, George Belmont Wuestling.
