= John Kippen Watson =

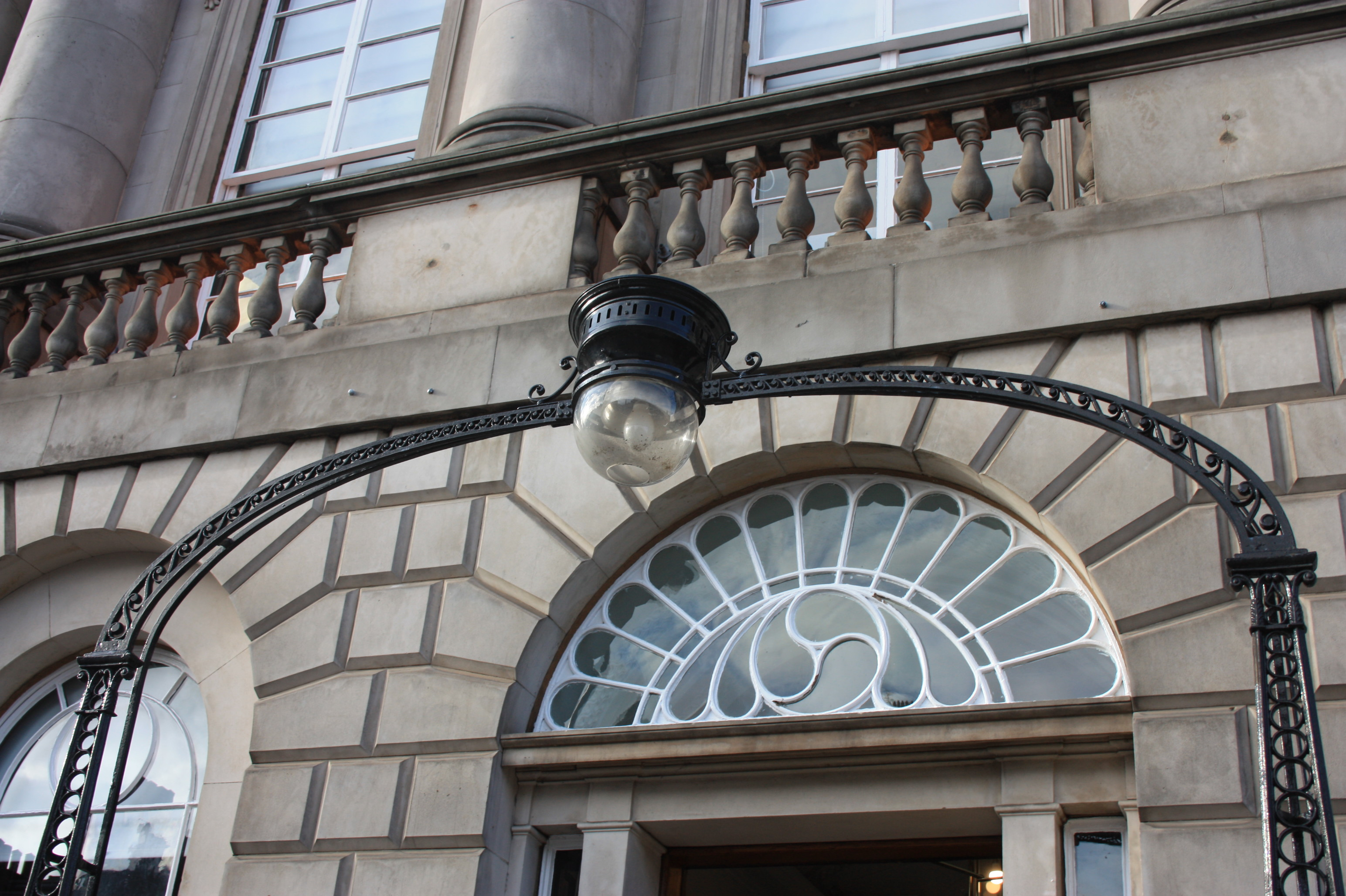
One of Watson's gas lamps on Melville Street Edinburgh (converted to electric use)

John Kippen Watson FRSE (1818-1891) was a 19th-century Scottish businessman. He is associated with major improvements to Edinburgh's gas lighting including the iconic lamp standard found throughout the New Town.

== Life ==
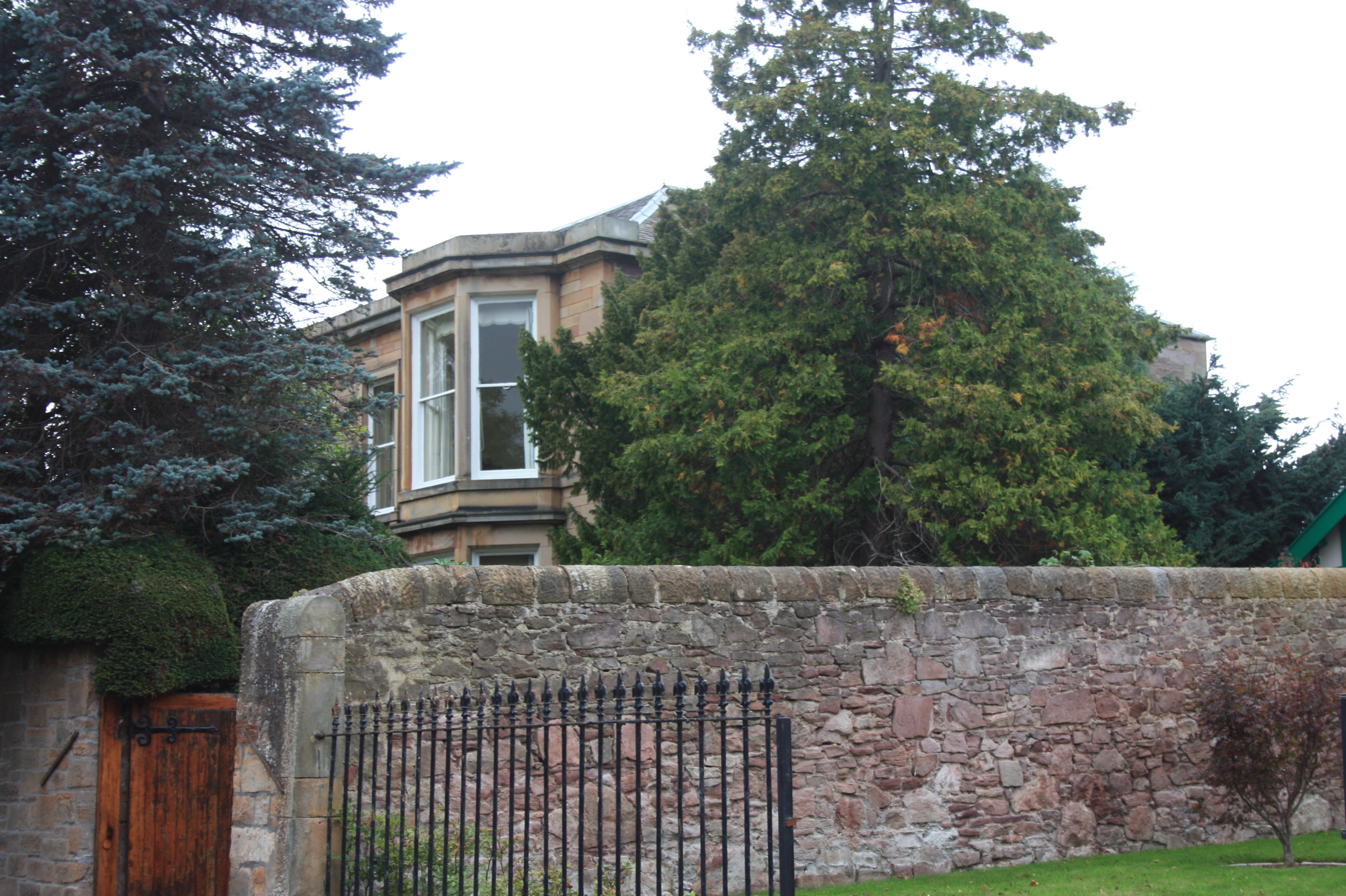
14 Blackford Road, Edinburgh

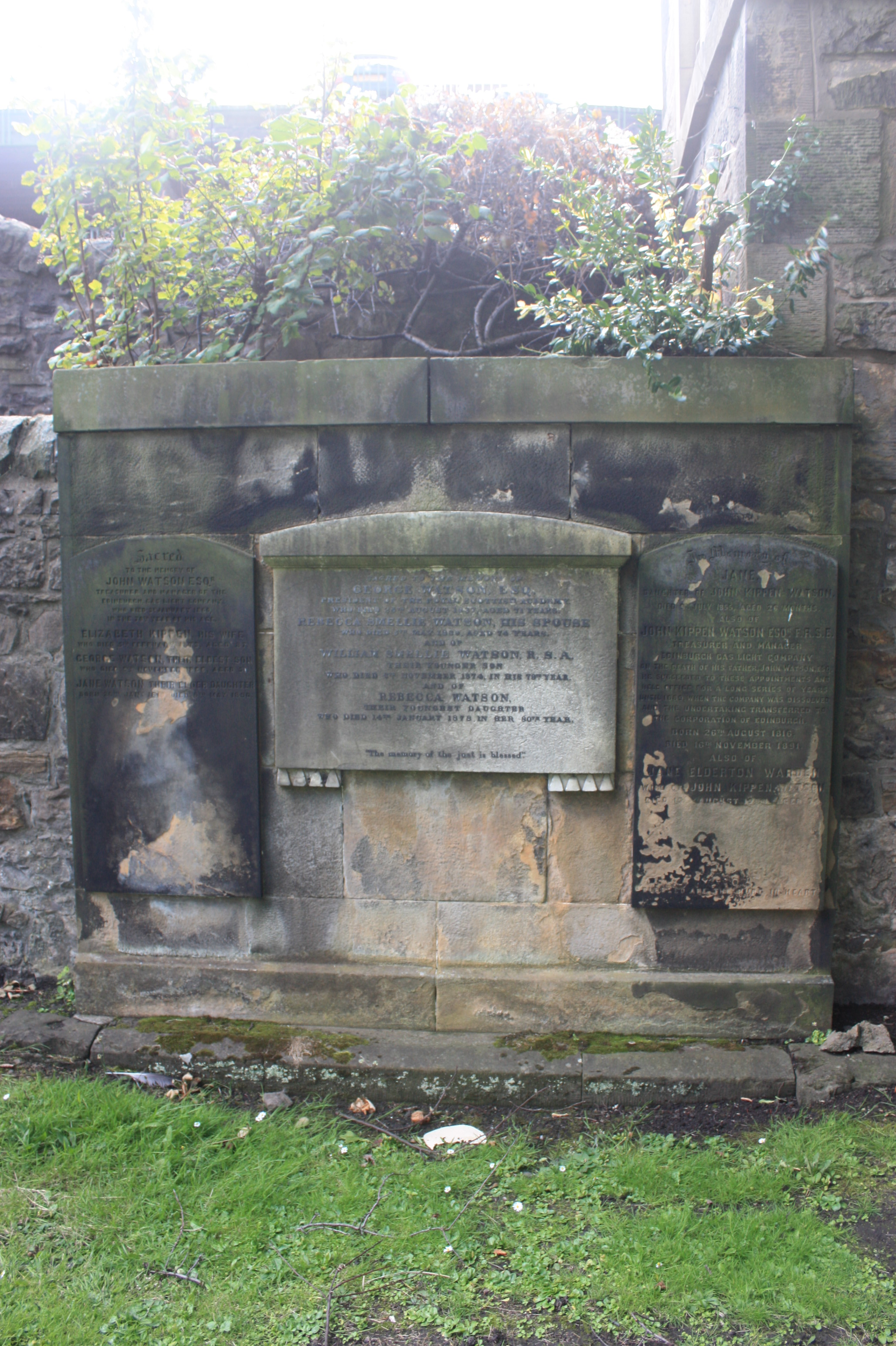
The grave of John Kippen Watson, St Cuthberts Churchyard, Edinburgh

He was born on 26 August 1818 in Edinburgh the son of John Watson and his wife Elizabeth Kippen. From around 1833 his father was manager of the Edinburgh Gas Lighting Company. The family lived at 6 Brunton Place close to Calton Hill. On the death of his father (around 1840) he took on his roles of running the Edinburgh Gas Lighting Company

In the 1860s he introduced a new style of gas lamp, specific to Edinburgh, and associated with iconic areas such as Charlotte Square. In 1866 he was elected a Fellow of the Royal Society of Edinburgh his proposer being William Swan.

His company was transferred to Edinburgh Corporation in 1889, putting it into public control. This also involved converting the gas lamps to use with electricity, which had come to the city in 1881.

In later life he lived at 14 Blackford Road in the south of Edinburgh, and was one of the first persons in Edinburgh to have a telephone.

He died on 16 November 1891. He is buried in the grave of George Watson RSA (who appears to have been his uncle) at St Cuthberts Churchyard at the west end of Princes Street. The grave lies in the southmost section against the western wall. His parents are also buried there.

== Family ==
He was married to Jane Elderton Warren.

He was cousin to the artist William Smellie Watson RSA.
