= Waite Hoyt =

American baseball player (1899–1984)

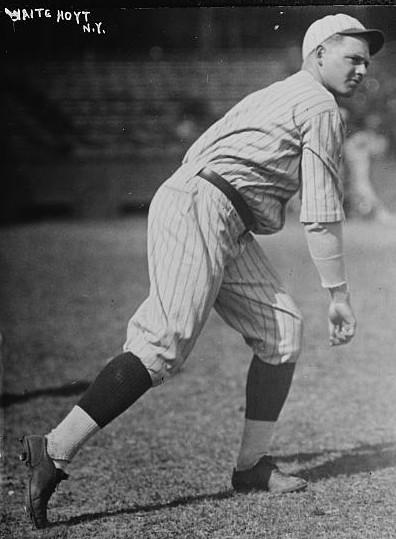
- Hoyt in 1922
- Pitcher
- Born: September 9, 1899; Brooklyn, New York, U.S.
- Died: August 25, 1984 (aged 84); Cincinnati, Ohio, U.S.
- Batted: Right Threw: Right

MLB debut
- July 24, 1918, for the New York Giants

Last MLB appearance
- May 15, 1938, for the Brooklyn Dodgers

MLB statistics
- Win–loss record: 237–182
- Earned run average: 3.59
- Strikeouts: 1,206
- Stats at Baseball Reference

Teams
- New York Giants (1918); Boston Red Sox (1919–1920); New York Yankees (1921–1930); Detroit Tigers (1930–1931); Philadelphia Athletics (1931); Brooklyn Dodgers (1932); New York Giants (1932); Pittsburgh Pirates (1933–1937); Brooklyn Dodgers (1937–1938)

Career highlights and awards
- 3× World Series champion (1923, 1927, 1928); AL wins leader (1927)

Member of the National

Baseball Hall of Fame
- Induction: 1969
- Election method: Veterans Committee

Waite Charles Hoyt (September 9, 1899 – August 25, 1984) was an American right-handed professional baseball pitcher who played in Major League Baseball for seven different teams during 1918–1938. He was one of the dominant pitchers of the 1920s, and the most successful pitcher for the New York Yankees during that decade. He was inducted into the National Baseball Hall of Fame in 1969.

== Early life ==
Hoyt was born in Brooklyn, New York, to Addison and Louise Benedum Hoyt, and attended Erasmus Hall High School.

== Career ==
=== Baseball ===
Despite being a Dodgers fan, Hoyt was signed to a professional contract by New York Giants manager John McGraw when he was but 15. Because of his extreme youth, he was immediately nicknamed "the Schoolboy Wonder". Ernie Stanton also was the one that got him his job with the Giants.

After a brief stint with the Giants, McGraw sent Hoyt to the minors for refinement and experience. Hoyt soon returned to the majors, this time with the Boston Red Sox. His performance there attracted the attention of the Yankees, who acquired him in 1920. In his first season as a Yankee, he won 19 games and pitched three complete games in the World Series without allowing an earned run – over his career, he would win six American League pennants with the Yankees and one with the Philadelphia Athletics. In his finest years with the Yankees, 1927 and 1928, Hoyt posted records of 22 wins and 7 losses with a 2.64 earned run average (ERA) and 23 wins and 7 losses with a 3.36 ERA. During his 21-year career, he won 10 or more games 12 times, 11 of them consecutively.

In May 1930, the Yankees traded Hoyt and Mark Koenig to the Detroit Tigers for Ownie Carroll, Harry Rice, and Yats Wuestling. He pitched for eight years after leaving the Yankees in 1930, but did not consistently display similar levels of pitching dominance.

Hoyt finished his career with a win–loss record of 237–182 and an ERA of 3.59. By the time he retired in 1938, he had pitched the most victories in World Series history (his World Series record with the Yankees and A's was 6–4).

As a hitter, Hoyt posted a .198 batting average (255-for-1287) with 96 runs, 100 RBI and 40 bases on balls. Defensively, he recorded a .966 fielding percentage which was 9 points higher than the league average at his position.

Hoyt had a total of 36 Major League teammates who would later be elected to the Hall of Fame. As of 2009, no other Hall of Famer has had more Hall of Fame teammates.

=== Additional/concurrent careers ===
In addition to the "Schoolboy" moniker appearing on his Hall of Fame plaque, Hoyt was also known as "the Merry Mortician", for when he was not playing baseball, he spent days working as a funeral director and nights appearing in vaudeville. As a vaudevillian, he appeared with many of the most well-known performers of the day, including Jack Benny, Jimmy Durante, George Burns, and others. He kept in shape during the off-season by playing semi-professional basketball.

He added to his repertoire by becoming an accomplished painter and writer, including two published books: “Babe Ruth as I Knew Him” (Dell Publishing Company, 1948) and “Schoolboy: The Untold Journey of a Yankees Hero,” (University of Nebraska Press, 2024), a posthumous memoir, with co-author Tim Manners and foreword by Bob Costas.

=== Broadcasting ===
After retiring as a player, Hoyt went into radio broadcasting. He was heard on WMCA in New York City but left that station to begin "a nightly quarter-hour program" of sports news and commentary on WNEW in New York, beginning October 17, 1938.

During a stint as the host of Grandstand and Bandstand on WMCA, he tried to audition for the Yankees, but sponsor Wheaties vetoed him out of hand. The common view at the time was that former players did not possess enough education or vocabulary to be successful broadcasters. However, Hoyt was well known for dressing down umpire George Moriarty when he missed a call by saying, "You're out of your element. You should be a traffic cop so you could stand in the middle of the street with a badge on your chest and insult people with impunity!"

Dodgers voice Red Barber, however, thought more of Hoyt's abilities and hired him to host the team's post-game shows on WOR in 1940. Two years later, Hoyt became the play-by-play voice of the Cincinnati Reds, a post he held for 24 seasons. He became as much a celebrity with the Reds as he was while a player. He was well known for calling games exclusively in past tense, which was and still is unusual for sportscasting. Whereas most baseball announcers would say, "Here's the pitch!" Hoyt would say, "There was the pitch!" He told author Curt Smith that he felt using past tense was more accurate, because "as I speak to you, what happened a moment ago is gone."

On the evening of August 16, 1948, the Reds played the Pittsburgh Pirates. During the game, Hoyt learned that his friend Babe Ruth had died. After the game, speaking without notes, Hoyt paid tribute to Ruth on the air for two hours. He was well known as the pre-eminent authority on Ruth; they were teammates from 1921 to 1930, and Ruth long counted Hoyt among his small inner circle of friends. Robert Creamer, author of the definitive Ruth biography Babe, indicated in that book's introduction that the novella-length memoir written by Hoyt shortly after Ruth's death was "by far the most revealing and rewarding work on Ruth."

Nationally, Hoyt shared radio play-by-play duties for the 1953 All-Star Game on the Mutual network and the second 1960 All-Star Game on NBC Radio. He also called the 1961 World Series on NBC Radio, in an era when it was common for the principal broadcasters for the participating teams to be utilized in the network broadcasts of the Fall Classic. As it happened, 1961 was the Reds' only World Series appearance during Hoyt's tenure in their booth. In fact, the team only finished in the first division seven other times during his tenure, leading Hoyt to call himself "a bad news broadcaster."

Hoyt became known for entertaining radio audiences during rain delays, sharing anecdotes and telling vivid stories from his days as a player; a selection of these stories is collected on two record albums: The Best of Waite Hoyt in the Rain, and Waite Hoyt Talks Babe Ruth. Hoyt was one of the first professional athletes to develop a successful career in broadcasting and his name frequently appears on "all-time best" broadcaster lists.

He retired from full-time broadcasting work in 1965, though he later made appearances on both radio and television, including the color commentary for the Reds telecasts in 1972. On June 10, 2007, the Reds honored Hoyt, Marty Brennaman, and Joe Nuxhall with replica microphones that are hung below the radio broadcast booth at Great American Ball Park in Cincinnati.

== Honors and legacy ==
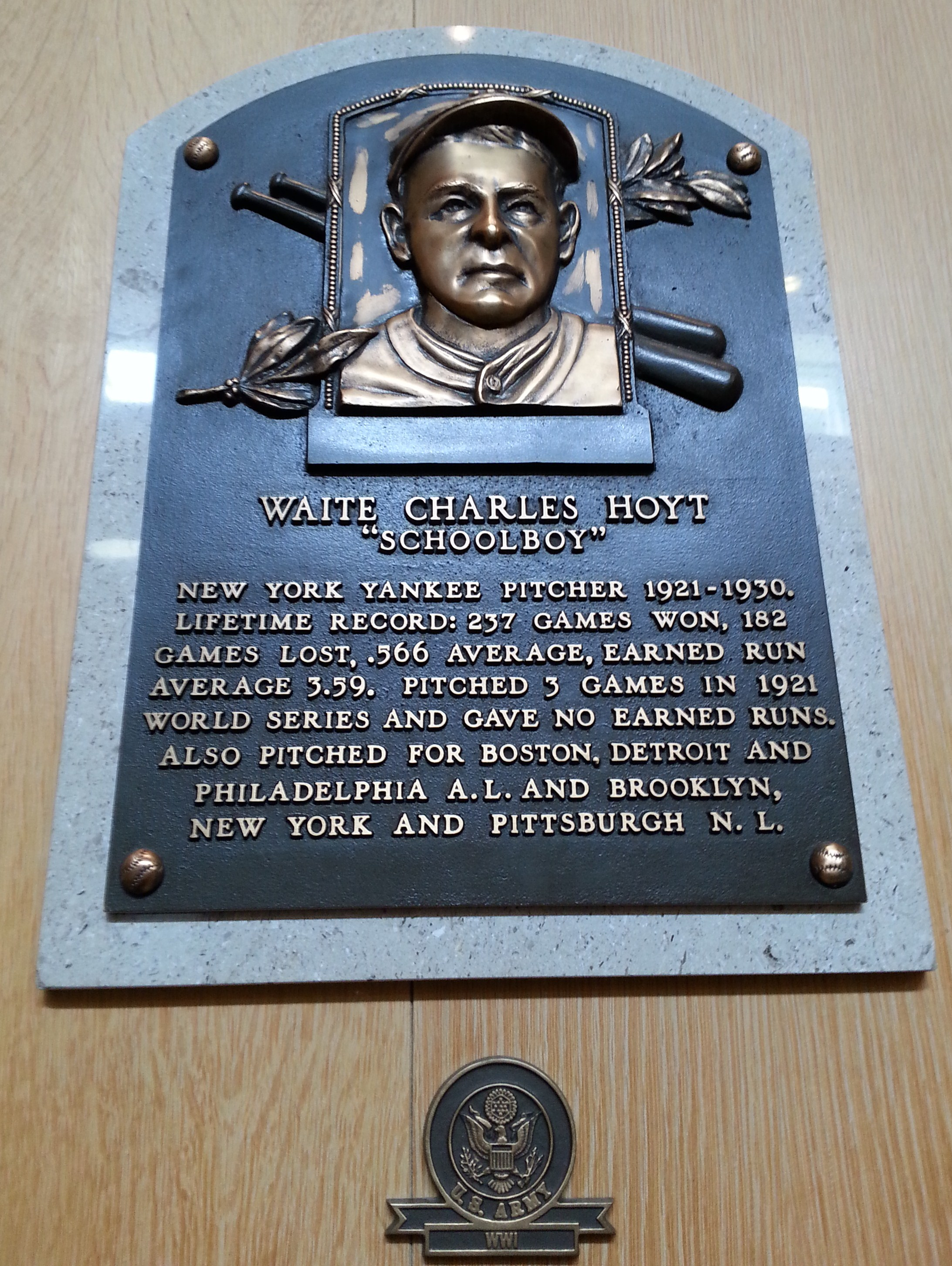
Hoyt's plaque at the Baseball Hall of Fame

Hoyt was elected to the Baseball Hall of Fame by its Veterans Committee in 1969.

The Cincinnati chapter of the Society of American Baseball Research is named in honor of Hoyt.

== Personal life ==
Hoyt married Dorothy Pyle in 1922. The couple was divorced ten years later. He then married Ellen Burbank. She died on November 23, 1982.

He last married Betty Derie on March 5, 1983. Derie, a longtime fan, was an associate of Warren Giles, first President of the Reds and subsequently of the National League. Betty lived in Cincinnati until her death on December 25, 2015, and was interviewed extensively in the video biography Waite's World written and directed by Donn Burrows. The video bio was released on VHS in 1997 and includes interviews with his son Chris, the late Hall of Fame broadcaster Joe Nuxhall, reporter and television personality Nick Clooney, and retired Reds pitcher Jim O'Toole. It is available to view with a simple Google search of "Waite's World Video"

A longtime member of Alcoholics Anonymous, during the 1978 Old-Timers' Day game, Hoyt said wistfully that he would have won 300 games if he had stopped drinking during his playing days. After joining AA, he remained sober for more than 40 years.

Hoyt died of heart failure while preparing for what he realized would be his final visit to the Hall of Fame in Cooperstown, New York. He is interred in Spring Grove Cemetery in Cincinnati.

== See also ==
- List of Major League Baseball career wins leaders
- List of Major League Baseball annual saves leaders
- List of Major League Baseball annual wins leaders

Sporting positions
Preceded by Jack Quinn	Brooklyn Dodgers Opening Day; Starting pitcher 1932	Succeeded by Watty Clark
