= Johnny Guitar (disambiguation) =

Johnny Guitar is a 1954 film directed by Nicholas Ray.

Johnny Guitar may also refer to:

== Songs ==
- "Johnny Guitar" (song), the title song from the film by Peggy Lee
- "Johnny Guitar", a song from the album Queens of Noise by The Runaways
- "Johnny Guitar", a song from the album Backspacer by Pearl Jam

== People ==
- Johnny "Guitar" Watson (1935 – 1996), an American blues and funk guitarist and singer
- Johnny Byrne (1939–1999), guitarist for rock group Rory Storm and the Hurricanes; used the stage name Johnny Guitar

== Other ==
- Johnny Guitar (musical), 2004 stage musical
