= Liz Funk =

American baseball player (1904–1968)

- Center fielder
- Born: October 28, 1904; La Cygne, Kansas, U.S.
- Died: January 15, 1968 (aged 63); Oklahoma City, Oklahoma, U.S.
- Batted: Left Threw: Left

MLB debut
- April 26, 1929, for the New York Yankees

Last MLB appearance
- May 20, 1933, for the Chicago White Sox

MLB statistics
- Batting average: .267
- Home runs: 6
- Runs batted in: 105
- Stats at Baseball Reference

Teams
- New York Yankees (1929); Detroit Tigers (1930); Chicago White Sox (1932–1933)

Elias Calvin "Liz" Funk (October 28, 1904 – January 15, 1968) was an American left-handed baseball center fielder.

Funk played professional baseball from 1925 to 1941, including four seasons in Major League Baseball for the New York Yankees (1929), Detroit Tigers (1930), and Chicago White Sox (1932–1933). He played only two full seasons in the majors. In 1930, he was Detroit's starting center fielder and compiled a .275 batting average with 26 doubles, 11 triples, 65 RBIs, and 12 stolen bases. In 1932, he was Chicago's starting center fielder with a .259 batting average, 40 RBIs, and 17 stolen bases. Known for his speed, his range factor in the outfield ranked second in the American League in both 1930 and 1932.

During his minor league career, Funk also played for the Oklahoma City Indians (1925–1926), St. Paul Saints (1927–1928), Hollywood Stars (1929), Louisville Colonels (1931-1932), San Francisco Seals (1933–1934), Tulsa Oilers (1935–1936), Salina Millers (1939), and Pueblo Rollers (1941).

== Early years ==
Funk was born in 1904 on a farm near La Cygne, Kansas. He moved to Oklahoma City and attended Oklahoma City Central High School. In high school, he played baseball (as a pitcher and outfielder) and American football (as a quarterback and an all-state halfback) from 1921 to 1923. He then attended the University of Oklahoma for a year, though he did not play football or baseball there due to restrictions on freshman eligibility.

== Professional baseball ==
=== Oklahoma City ===
Funk signed his first professional contract with the Oklahoma City Indians of the Western League while still in high school. Playing at the time as a pitcher, he did not make the club during spring training and returned to high school. He returned to the Indians in April 1925. He played in the outfield for the Indians during the 1925 season and hit .306 with a .447 slugging percentage, 41 doubles, 15 triples, and seven home runs.

Funk improved further in 1926, batting .339 with a .491 slugging percentage. He also had 209 hits and 129 runs, led the Western League with 53 stolen bases, and tied for the league lead with 21 triples. And in the outfield, he tallied 431 putouts and 18 assists against 17 errors.

=== St. Paul, New York and Hollywood ===
Funk was purchased by the New York Yankees on October 12, 1926. During the Yankees' training camp in 1927, Funk was touted as the man who would replace Earl Combs in center field. The New York Daily News called Funk "a demon outfielder", and Manager Miller Huggins described him as "a fine young player – a hard left-handed hitter, fast in the outfield and a good thrower."

Despite the praise heaped on Funk during spring training, the Yankees sent him under option in late March 1927 to the St. Paul Saints of the American Association. He spent the 1927 and 1928 seasons at St. Paul. He showed a strong throwing arm in the outfield while playing with St. Paul, tallying 22 assists in 1927 and 21 in 1928. He also impressed at the plate, batting .311 in 1927 (with a .451 slugging percentage) and .304 in 1928. He also hit 20 triples in 1927.

Funk finally made it to the Yankees at the start of the 1929 season, but he appeared in only one game, on April 26, 1929, and did not have a plate appearance. In early May, he was sold to the Hollywood Stars of the Pacific Coast League. In 150 games for the Stars, he compiled a .384 batting average with a career-high .554 slugging percentage and 302 total bases.

=== Detroit Tigers ===
In September 1929, the Detroit Tigers purchased Funk from Hollywood in exchange for cash and two players. In 1930, Funk appeared in 140 games for the Tigers, including 127 as the team's starting center fielder. He hit .279 with a .389 slugging percentage, 21 doubles, 11 triples, four home runs, 65 RBIs, 74 runs, and 12 stolen bases. His four home runs included a grand slam on July 26 against the New York Yankees – the team that had discarded him without a single plate appearance. He also hit a bases-loaded triple against the Yankees on August 14.

Funk also ranked third in the American League with 23 sacrifice hits and fifth with five times having been hit by a pitch. He also ranked among the league's as a center fielder with 354 putouts (third), eight assists (third), four double plays (third), a .965 fielding percentage (fourth), and 13 errors (second). His range factor of 2.98 per nine innings was the third best among all American League outfielders.

As the 1931 season began, the Tigers were full of talent in the outfield, and the Detroit Free Press noted that Funk's "attitude has proven to be unpleasant all spring." The Tigers initially sold Funk to Sacramento in the Pacific Coast League (PCL). However, Funk threatened to quit the game rather than return to the PCL where he had spent his 1929 season. Accordingly, on April 14, the Tigers sold Funk to the Louisville Colonels of the American Association.

=== Louisville and Chicago ===
Funk appeared in 150 games for Louisville in 1931, batting .282 with a .404 slugging percentage and 15 triples. In the outfield, he made 375 putouts and had 13 assists and 16 errors.

On April 21, 1932, Louisville traded Funk to the Chicago White Sox in exchange for Mel Simons. Funk played in 122 games for the White Sox (103 as the team's starting center fielder) in 1932 As in 1930, he ranked among the American League's center fielders with 311 putouts (fifth), 11 assists (third), four double plays (second), seven errors (fifth), and a .979 fielding percentage (fourth). His range factor of 3.22 per nine innings was the second highest among all of the league's outfielders. At the plate, Funk's batting average dipped to .259 in 1932. He ranked fifth in the league with 17 stolen bases, but he also ranked second with 15 times caught stealing.

In 1933, Funk played in only 10 games for the White Sox. He appeared in his last major league game on May 20, 1933.

=== Minor leagues ===
On May 25, 1933, the San Francisco Seals acquired Funk on an option from the White Sox. He appeared in 110 games for the Seals in 1933 with a .298 batting average and .413 slugging percentage. He returned to the Seals in 1934, appeared in 169 games, and compiled a .288 batting average and .384 slugging percentage.

In 1935, Funk tried to purchase the Oklahoma City Indians. When his efforts were unsuccessful, he signed with the Tulsa Oilers of the Texas League. He played for Tulsa in both 1935 and 1936.

In 1939, Funk was player-manager for the Salina Millers of the Western Association. He played in 20 games and compiled a .397 batting average and .500 slugging percentage.

In 1941, Funk finished his baseball career at age 36 with the Pueblo Rollers in the Western League. In his final season, he compiled a .288 batting average with a .399 on-base percentage in 61 games.

== Later years ==
Funk did not marry and had no children. He died in 1968 at age 63 in an Oklahoma City hospital. He was buried in Fairlawn Cemetery in Oklahoma City.
