= Jimmy Shevlin =

American baseball player (1909–1974)

- First baseman
- Born: July 9, 1909; Cincinnati, Ohio
- Died: October 30, 1974 (aged 65); Fort Lauderdale, Florida
- Batted: Left Threw: Left

MLB debut
- June 29, 1930, for the Detroit Tigers

Last MLB appearance
- July 25, 1934, for the Cincinnati Reds

MLB statistics
- Batting average: .247
- Home runs: 0
- Runs batted in: 12
- Stats at Baseball Reference

Teams
- Detroit Tigers (1930); Cincinnati Reds (1932, 1934)

James Cornelius Shevlin (July 9, 1909 – October 30, 1974) was a first baseman in Major League Baseball. He played for the Detroit Tigers and Cincinnati Reds. Raised in Cincinnati by a father who was a politically active boxing promoter and restaurateur, Jimmy was considered one of the best college players in the East while at the College of the Holy Cross.
