= John Watson (cricketer, born 1828) =

Australian cricketer

John Watson (29 March 1828 – 26 June 1920) was an Australian cricketer who played for Tasmania. He was born in Sorell and died in Scottsdale.

Watson made a single first-class appearance for the side, during the 1851–52 season, against Victoria. From the opening order, he scored a duck in each innings in which he batted.

== See also ==
- List of Tasmanian representative cricketers
