= John A. Watson =

American politician

John A. Watson was an American politician. He served as a member of the 1862–1863 California State Assembly, representing the 2nd District.
