= Joe Samuels =

American baseball player (1905–1996)

- Pitcher
- Born: March 21, 1905; Scranton, Pennsylvania, U.S.
- Died: October 28, 1996 (aged 91); Bath, New York, U.S.
- Batted: Right Threw: Right

MLB debut
- April 23, 1930, for the Detroit Tigers

Last MLB appearance
- October 28, 1930, for the Detroit Tigers

MLB statistics
- Win–loss record: 0–0
- Earned run average: 16.50
- Strikeouts: 1
- Stats at Baseball Reference

Teams
- Detroit Tigers (1930)

Joseph Jonas Samuels (March 21, 1905 – October 28, 1996) was an American Major League Baseball pitcher who played in 1930 with the Detroit Tigers. He batted and threw right-handed. Samuels had a 0–0 record, with a 16.50 ERA, in two games, in his one-year career.

He was born in Scranton, Pennsylvania, and died in Bath, New York.
