= Jack Watson (British Army officer) =

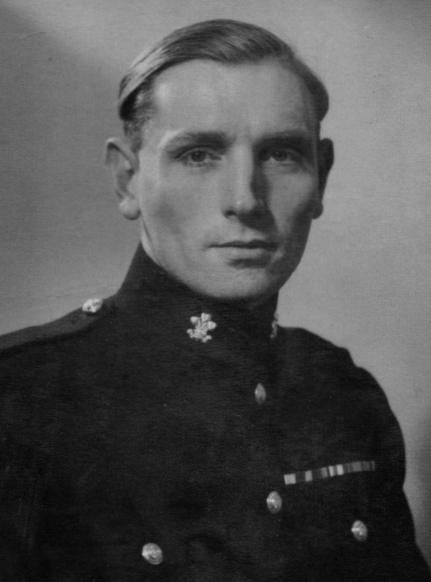
- Jack Watson
- Born: John Bernard Robert Watson; 14 January 1917; Scarborough, North Yorkshire, England
- Died: 12 April 2011 (aged 94)
- Military career
- Allegiance: United Kingdom
- Branch: British Army
- Service years: 1939–1958
- Rank: Major
- Service number: 237916
- Units: Duke of Cornwall's Light Infantry; South Lancashire Regiment; Parachute Regiment; West Yorkshire Regiment
- Conflicts: World War II; Palestine Emergency
- Awards: Military Cross; Legion of Honour

Major John Bernard Robert Watson MC (14 January 1917 – 12 April 2011) was a British Army officer who was awarded a Military Cross for gallantry whilst serving with 13 Parachute Battalion in the Ardennes during the Second World War.

== Military career ==
John Watson was born in Scarborough, North Yorkshire, on 14 January 1917. He enlisted in the British Army in 1939 during World War II and served, initially, with the Duke of Cornwall's Light Infantry and the South Lancashire Regiment. He served with the 2/4th Battalion, South Lancashires which in 1943 was converted into the 13th (Lancashire) Parachute Battalion.

Watson was a platoon commander on D-Day, 6 June 1944 and parachuted into Normandy and took part in the liberation of Ranville.

He served in the Ardennes as a company commander, and his company on 3 January 1945 led the assault into the village of Bure, Belgium. Watson's company from the launch of the attack came under heavy repeated attacks by enemy mortars, machine-guns and artillery, and there were immediate casualties. He led the company forward and when under attack organised the defences and drove the enemy from the part of the village his company had been tasked to clear. An extract from the citation for his Military Cross reads: " His conduct, energy and gallantry throughout were beyond praise, and without him the attack might well have failed. "

Watson served in Operation Varsity: the air assault landing over the Rhine on 24 March 1945 and took part in the advance across Germany to the Baltic Sea.

Following the Second World War he served in Palestine and was adjutant of the 1st Battalion The West Yorkshire Regiment in Austria and the Canal Zone. He served with the 2nd Parachute Battalion before retiring from the Army in 1958.

He worked for J Lyons and Co to 1982. He was president of the Airborne Assault Normandy Trust. Watson was appointed a Chevalier of the Legion d'honneur in 2005. He was made an honorary citizen of Bure and Tellin in the Ardennes and of Ranville, Normandy.

Watson had a leading role in organising the ceremonies which commemorate the anniversaries of the battle for Normandy, Ardennes campaign and the River Rhine crossing.

He married Laura Eyre in 1938 with whom he was to have one son and four daughters.

Major Jack Watson MC died on 12 April 2011, at the age of 94.

== Sources ==
- Obituary The Daily Telegraph 19.5.11,
- The Red Devils The story of the British Airborne Forces GG Norton (1971)
- Go To It! The Illustrated History of 6 Airborne Division Peter Harclerode (2000).
