= Jack Watson (Australian footballer) =

Australian rules footballer

Personal information
- Full name: Jack Watson
- Born: 29 August 1927
- Died: 28 May 2013 (aged 85)
- Original team: Richmond United
- Height: 183 cm (6 ft 0 in)
- Weight: 79 kg (174 lb)

Playing career^{1}
Years	Club	Games (Goals)
1947–49	Richmond	18 (8)
- ^{1} Playing statistics correct to the end of 1949.

Jack Watson (29 August 1927 – 28 May 2013) was a former Australian rules footballer who played with Richmond in the Victorian Football League (VFL).
