= John Michael Watson =

British botanist (1936–2024)

- Born: 1936 (age 89–90)
- Died: 14 June 2024 (aged 87–88)
- Scientific career
- Fields: Botany

John Michael Watson (1936 – 14 June 2024) was an English botanist, who has worked with the flora of Argentina, Bolivia and Chile. He visited the Ruiz Leal Herbarium in Mendoza, Argentina.

He married his colleague Ana Rosa Flores [es] in 1994, owning the botanic nursery business Flores & Watson Seeds. They took on various trips to collect specimens from Argentina, Bolivia and Chile.

== Notable publications ==
- John Michael Watson, Ana Rosa Flores. 2009. A new and rare rosulate species of Viola (Violaceae) from Argentina. Phytotaxa 2: 19–23
- Watson, J.M. (2019). Lest we forget. A new identity and status for a Viola of section Andinium W. Becker; named for an old and treasured friend and companion. Plus another... (PDF). International Rock Gardener (117).

The standard author abbreviation J.M.Watson is used to indicate this person as the author when citing a botanical name.
