= Johnny Watson (baseball) =

American baseball player (1908–1965)

- Shortstop
- Born: January 16, 1908; Tazewell, Virginia, U.S.
- Died: April 29, 1965 (aged 57); Huntington, West Virginia, U.S.
- Batted: Left Threw: Right

MLB debut
- September 26, 1930, for the Detroit Tigers

Last MLB appearance
- September 28, 1930, for the Detroit Tigers

MLB statistics
- Games played: 4
- At bats: 14
- Hits: 3
- Stats at Baseball Reference

Teams
- Detroit Tigers (1930)

John Thomas Watson (January 16, 1908 – April 29, 1965) was an American Major League Baseball player. Watson played for the Detroit Tigers in 1930. He batted left and threw right-handed.

In 1986, he was inducted into the Marshall University Athletics Hall of Fame for his collegiate career in baseball and basketball.

He was born in Tazewell, Virginia, and died in Huntington, West Virginia.
