= Ownie Carroll =

American baseball player (1902–1975)

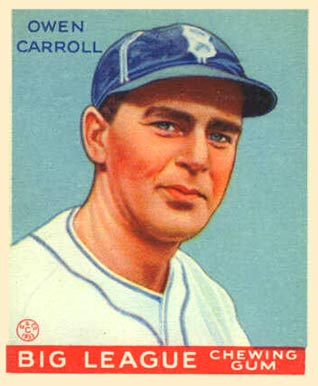
- Pitcher
- Born: November 11, 1902; Kearny, New Jersey, U.S.
- Died: June 8, 1975 (aged 72); Orange, New Jersey, U.S.
- Batted: Right Threw: Right

MLB debut
- June 20, 1925, for the Detroit Tigers

Last MLB appearance
- September 21, 1934, for the Brooklyn Dodgers

MLB statistics
- Win–loss record: 64–90
- Earned run average: 4.43
- Strikeouts: 311
- Stats at Baseball Reference

Teams
- Detroit Tigers (1925, 1927–1930); New York Yankees (1930); Cincinnati Reds (1930–1932); Brooklyn Dodgers (1933–1934)

Member of the College

Baseball Hall of Fame
- Induction: 2008

Owen Thomas "Ownie" Carroll, (November 11, 1902 – June 8, 1975) was an American Major League Baseball pitcher who played nine seasons in the major leagues with the Detroit Tigers (1925, 1927–1930), New York Yankees (1930), Cincinnati Reds (1930–1932), and Brooklyn Dodgers (1933–1934).

== High school and college career ==
Born in Kearny, New Jersey, Ownie was a right-handed thrower who played high school ball at Saint Benedict's Preparatory School in Newark, New Jersey. He accumulated a record of 49 wins and 2 losses at St. Benedict's Prep.

Carroll attended College of the Holy Cross at Worcester, Massachusetts, where he became widely known as the best pitcher in college baseball. He pitched a complete game, 15-inning 2–1 win against Harvard in 1922. Between 1922 and 1925, he had a record of 50 wins and 2 losses for the Holy Cross Crusaders. His two losses came as a sophomore, and he compiled perfect records of 8–0 in 1922, 11–0 in 1924 and 16–0 in 1925.

== Major League career ==
Carroll made his major league debut for the Tigers on June 20, 1925. His best season was 1928 when he went 16–12 for the Tigers in 231 innings. He came in 20th in the American League Most Valuable player voting in 1928 after finishing ninth in the league in earned run average (ERA) (3.27), ninth in complete games (19), ninth in Adjusted ERA+ (126), and sixth in hits allowed per 9 innings (8.53). In 1929, Carroll's record turned on its head as he went 9–17, with his 17 losses ranking seventh in the league. Three years later, Carroll lost 18 games for the Reds, the most losses by a pitcher that year. Caroll finished his career in 1934 with the Dodgers. Over his 11-year major league career, Carroll was 64–90 in 1,330 inning pitched with an ERA of 4.43.

Carroll holds the record for having been traded for future Hall of Famers. He was traded to the Yankees for Waite Hoyt, to the Cards for Jim Bottomley, and to the Dodgers for Dazzy Vance.

== Coaching career ==
Carroll was the coach of the Seton Hall Pirates from 1948 to 1972. Carroll led the Seton Hall Pirates to a winning record in 21 of his 25 years as their coach. The Pirates under Coach Caroll had ten seasons with winning percentages above .700, including the following:

- 1948: 13–1 (.900)
- 1949: 18–3 (.857)
- 1950: 15–5 (.750)
- 1951: 15–4 (.775)
- 1953: 11–3 (.786)
- 1959: 13–4 (.765)
- 1964: 25–5 (.833)
- 1966: 20–6 (.759)

The baseball field at Seton Hall was renamed Owen T. Carroll Field in his honor.

== Death ==
Carroll died in Orange, New Jersey, in 1975 at age 72, and was buried at Gate of Heaven Cemetery in East Hanover, New Jersey. He was survived by 4 children and 10 grandchildren.
