= Cleveland Guardians all-time roster =

List of baseball players

The following is a list of players, both past and current, who appeared in at least one game for the Cleveland American League franchise known as the Blues (1901), Bronchos (1902), Naps (1903–14), Indians (1915–2021), and Guardians (2022–present).

Players in bold are members of the National Baseball Hall of Fame. Players in italics have had their numbers retired by the team.

List current as of June 26, 2026

== A ==
- Fred Abbott
- Paul Abbott
- Al Aber
- Bill Abernathie
- Ted Abernathy
- Harry Ables
- Winston Abreu
- Jeremy Accardo
- Austin Adams
- Bert Adams
- Joe Adcock
- Tommie Agee
- Luis Aguayo
- Jesús Aguilar
- Hank Aguirre
- Darrel Akerfelds
- Matt Albers
- Mike Aldrete
- Franco Alemán
- Bob Alexander
- Gary Alexander
- Hugh Alexander
- Andy Allanson
- Kolby Allard
- Bob Allen
- Chad Allen
- Cody Allen
- Greg Allen
- Johnny Allen
- Logan S. Allen (born 1997)
- Logan T. Allen (born 1998)
- Neil Allen
- Rod Allen
- Milo Allison
- Beau Allred
- Abraham Almonte
- **Roberto Alomar**
- Sandy Alomar Jr.
- Yonder Alonso
- Dell Alston
- Dave Altizer
- Joe Altobelli
- Luis Alvarado
- Max Alvis
- Rubén Amaro Jr.
- Héctor Ambriz
- Larry Andersen
- Brady Anderson
- Brian Anderson
- Bud Anderson
- Cody Anderson
- Dwain Anderson
- Jason Anderson
- Ivy Andrews
- Nate Andrews
- Johnny Antonelli
- Luis Aponte
- Pete Appleton
- Greg Aquino
- Gabriel Arias
- Steve Arlin
- Jack Armstrong
- Mike Armstrong
- Shawn Armstrong
- Brad Arnsberg
- Christian Arroyo
- Jairo Asencio
- Alan Ashby
- Ken Aspromonte
- Paul Assenmacher
- Scott Atchison
- Keith Atherton
- Michael Aubrey
- Rick Austin
- Chick Autry
- Bruce Aven
- **Earl Averill**
- Earl Averill Jr.
- Bobby Ávila
- Pedro Ávila
- Mike Avilés
- John Axford
- Benny Ayala
- Dick Aylward
- Joe Azcue

== B ==
- Mike Bacsik
- Carlos Baerga
- Danys Báez
- Jim Bagby Jr.
- Jim Bagby Sr.
- Scott Bailes
- Steve Bailey
- **Harold Baines**
- Bock Baker
- Frank Baker
- Howard Baker
- Neal Ball
- Mark Ballinger
- Chris Bando
- George Banks
- Alan Bannister
- Walter Barbare
- Jap Barbeau
- Josh Bard
- Josh Barfield
- Len Barker
- Ray Barker
- Jeff Barkley
- Scott Barlow
- Brandon Barnes
- Brian Barnes
- Rich Barnes
- Scott Barnes
- Les Barnhart
- Cliff Bartosh
- Jim Baskette
- Johnny Bassler
- Ray Bates
- Peyton Battenfield
- Rick Bauer
- Trevor Bauer
- Jake Bauers
- Jim Baxes
- Harry Bay
- Bill Bayne
- Travis Bazzana
- Johnny Beall
- Belve Bean
- Gene Bearden
- Kevin Bearse
- Erve Beck
- George Beck
- Heinz Becker
- Joe Becker
- Gene Bedford
- Phil Bedgood
- Fred Beebe
- Tyler Beede
- Fred Beene
- Rick Behenna
- Matt Belisle
- Jeff Beliveau
- Beau Bell
- Buddy Bell
- David Bell
- Eric Bell
- Gary Bell
- Jay Bell
- Josh Bell
- Albert Belle
- Ronnie Belliard
- Harry Bemis
- Ray Benge
- Stan Benjamin
- Henry Benn
- Will Benson
- Al Benton
- Butch Benton
- Johnny Berardino
- Jason Bere
- Moe Berg
- Boze Berger
- Heinie Berger
- Al Bergman
- Tony Bernazard
- Bill Bernhard
- Gerónimo Berroa
- Joe Berry
- Ken Berry
- Bob Bescher
- Rafael Betancourt
- Kurt Bevacqua
- Jason Beverlin
- Jim Bibby
- Tanner Bibee
- Shane Bieber
- Mike Bielecki
- Nick Bierbrodt
- Josh Billings
- Steve Biras
- Joe Birmingham
- Lloyd Bishop
- Rivington Bisland
- Bud Black
- Don Black
- George Blaeholder
- Willie Blair
- Casey Blake
- Ossie Blanco
- Fred Blanding
- Larvell Blanks
- **Bert Blyleven**
- Bruce Bochte
- Eddie Bockman
- Joe Boehling
- John Bohnet
- Joe Boley
- Jim Bolger
- Cecil Bolton
- Cody Bolton
- Walt Bond
- Bobby Bonds
- Frank Bonner
- Bill Bonness
- Buddy Booker
- Red Booles
- Aaron Boone
- Dan Boone
- Ray Boone
- Pat Borders
- Joe Borowski
- Dick Bosman
- Harley Boss
- Denis Boucher
- **Lou Boudreau**
- Michael Bourn
- Abe Bowman
- Ted Bowsfield
- Gary Boyd
- Jason Boyd
- Matthew Boyd
- Jack Bracken
- Buddy Bradford
- Bill Bradley
- Bobby Bradley
- Jack Bradley
- Milton Bradley
- Dick Braggins
- Jeff Branson
- Michael Brantley
- Russell Branyan
- Ad Brennan
- Tom Brennan
- Will Brennan
- Bert Brenner
- Lynn Brenton
- Bill Brenzel
- Craig Breslow
- Jamie Brewington
- Charlie Brewster
- Rocky Bridges
- Dan Briggs
- John Briggs
- Lou Brissie
- Johnny Broaca
- Dick Brodowski
- Connor Brogdon
- Jack Brohamer
- Herman Bronkie
- Tom Brookens
- Ben Broussard
- Frank Brower
- Jim Brower
- Andrew Brown
- Clint Brown
- Dick Brown
- Jackie Brown
- Jordan Brown
- Jumbo Brown
- Larry Brown
- Lloyd Brown
- Jerry Browne
- Jay Bruce
- Travis Buck
- Garland Buckeye
- Fritz Buelow
- Dave Burba
- Larry Burchart
- Ellis Burks
- Johnny Burnett
- Jeromy Burnitz
- George Burns
- Ellis Burton
- Jim Busby
- Tom Buskey
- Hank Butcher
- John Butcher
- Bill Butler
- Brett Butler
- Marlon Byrd
- Paul Byrd

== C ==
- Asdrúbal Cabrera
- Fernando Cabrera
- Jolbert Cabrera
- Melky Cabrera
- Orlando Cabrera
- Joe Caffie
- Ben Caffyn
- Wayne Cage
- Cam Cairncross
- Bruce Caldwell
- Ray Caldwell
- Kole Calhoun
- Alex Call
- Dave Callahan
- Paul Calvert
- Ernie Camacho
- Lou Camilli
- Bruce Campbell
- Soup Campbell
- Cardell Camper
- Casey Candaele
- Tom Candiotti
- Joey Cantillo
- Russ Canzler
- Bernie Carbo
- José Cardenal
- Leo Cárdenas
- Fred Carisch
- Luke Carlin
- **Steve Carlton**
- Fausto Carmona
- Eddie Carnett
- Charlie Carr
- Carlos Carrasco
- Ezequiel Carrera
- Jamey Carroll
- Chico Carrasquel
- Cam Carreon
- Mark Carreon
- Kit Carson
- Matt Carson
- Joe Carter
- Paul Carter
- Rico Carty
- George Case
- Sean Casey
- Larry Casian
- Carmen Castillo
- Anthony Castro
- Slade Cecconi
- Pete Center
- Ed Cermak
- Rick Cerone
- Bob Chakales
- Joba Chamberlain
- Chris Chambliss
- Bob Chance
- Dean Chance
- Yu Chang
- Ben Chapman
- Ray Chapman
- Sam Chapman
- Larry Chappell
- Joe Charboneau
- Charlie Chech
- Virgil Cheeves
- Bruce Chen
- Lonnie Chisenhall
- Shin-Soo Choo
- Mike Christopher
- Russ Christopher
- Vinnie Chulk
- Chuck Churn
- Al Cicotte
- Al Cihocki
- Adam Cimber
- Bill Cissell
- Aaron Civale
- Uke Clanton
- Allie Clark
- Bob Clark
- Bryan Clark
- Dave Clark
- Ginger Clark
- Jim Clark
- Mark Clark
- Terry Clark
- Watty Clark
- Josh Clarke
- Nig Clarke
- Sumpter Clarke
- Walter Clarkson
- Emmanuel Clase
- Ernie Clement
- Mike Clevinger
- Ty Cline
- Billy Clingman
- Lou Clinton
- Tyler Clippard
- David Clyde
- Alex Cobb
- Chris Codiroli
- Rocky Colavito
- Vince Colbert
- A. J. Cole
- Alex Cole
- Bert Cole
- Bob Coleman
- Gordy Coleman
- Allan Collamore
- Hap Collard
- Don Collins
- Zack Collins
- Jackie Collum
- Bartolo Colón
- Joe Colón
- Merl Combs
- Steve Comer
- Bunk Congalton
- Sarge Connally
- Bruce Connatser
- Ed Connolly
- Joe Connolly
- Joe Connor
- Jim Constable
- Jack Conway
- Herb Conyers
- Dennis Cook
- Alex Cora
- Joey Cora
- Wil Cordero
- Marty Cordova
- David Cortés
- Marlan Coughtry
- Fritz Coumbe
- **Stan Coveleski**
- Collin Cowgill
- Ted Cox
- Howard Craghead
- Rod Craig
- Del Crandall
- Keith Creel
- Jack Cressend
- Coco Crisp
- Bill Cristall
- Kyle Crockett
- Ed Crosby
- Frank Cross
- Trevor Crowe
- Francisco Cruceta
- Jacob Cruz
- Víctor Cruz
- Roy Cullenbine
- Nick Cullop (OF)
- Nick Cullop (P)
- Wil Culmer
- George Culver
- Aaron Cunningham
- Tony Curry
- Xzavion Curry
- Chad Curtis
- Jack Curtis
- Al Cypert

== D ==
- Jeff D'Amico
- Paul Dade
- Bill Dailey
- Pete Dalena
- Bud Daley
- Tom Daly
- Johnny Damon
- Lee Dashner
- Vic Davalillo
- Homer Davidson
- Bill Davis
- Harry Davis
- Jason Davis
- Kane Davis
- Rajai Davis
- Steve Davis
- Joey Dawley
- Joe Dawson
- Mike de la Hoz
- Enyel De Los Santos
- Chubby Dean
- Hank DeBerry
- Jeff Dedmon
- Frank Delahanty
- Chase DeLauter
- David Dellucci
- Rich DeLucia
- Don Demeter
- Steve Demeter
- Ben Demott
- Rick Dempsey
- Kyle Denney
- Otto Denning
- John Denny
- Sam Dente
- Sean DePaula
- Mark DeRosa
- Gene Desautels
- Delino DeShields Jr.
- Paul Des Jardien
- George DeTore
- Ross Detwiler
- Jim Devlin
- Bo Díaz
- Einar Díaz
- Juan Díaz
- Yandy Díaz
- Paul Dicken
- Chris Dickerson
- George Dickerson
- Don Dillard
- Harley Dillinger
- Miguel Diloné
- Jerry Dipoto
- Walt Doan
- Joe Dobson
- Pat Dobson
- **Larry Doby**
- Frank Doljack
- Pat Donahue
- Red Donahue
- Jason Donald
- Josh Donaldson
- Brendan Donnelly
- Pete Donohue
- Dick Donovan
- Mike Donovan
- Tom Donovan
- Bill Doran
- Red Dorman
- Gus Dorner
- Brian Dorsett
- Cal Dorsett
- Pete Dowling
- Logan Drake
- Oliver Drake
- Tom Drake
- Ryan Drese
- Tim Drew
- Jason Dubois
- Frank Duffy
- Dave Duncan
- Shelley Duncan
- George Dunlop
- Steve Dunning
- Shawon Dunston
- Todd Dunwoody
- Chad Durbin
- Jerry Dybzinski
- Jim Dyck

== E ==
- Truck Eagan
- Luke Easter
- Jamie Easterly
- Ted Easterly
- **Dennis Eckersley**
- George Edmondson
- Eddie Edmonson
- Doc Edwards
- Hank Edwards
- Jim Joe Edwards
- Jon Edwards
- Harry Eells
- Ben Egan
- Bruce Egloff
- Hack Eibel
- Juan Eichelberger
- Ike Eichrodt
- Harry Eisenstat
- Scott Elarton
- Dave Elder
- Frank Ellerbe
- Bruce Ellingsen
- John Ellis
- George Ellison
- Dick Ellsworth
- Alan Embree
- Red Embree
- Edwin Encarnación
- Joe Engel
- Clyde Engle
- Nic Enright
- Johnny Enzmann
- Jim Eschen
- Alex Escobar
- José Escobar
- Daniel Espino
- Álvaro Espinoza
- Chuck Essegian
- Jim Essian
- Ferd Eunick
- Joe Evans
- Adam Everett
- Hoot Evers

== F ==
- Tony Faeth
- Jerry Fahr
- Ferris Fain
- Bibb Falk
- Cy Falkenberg
- Harry Fanwell
- Ed Farmer
- Jack Farmer
- Steve Farr
- John Farrell
- Sal Fasano
- **Bob Feller**
- Félix Fermín
- Tony Fernández
- Don Ferrarese
- Wes Ferrell
- Tom Ferrick
- Cy Ferry
- Matt Festa
- Chick Fewster
- Cecil Fielder
- Chuck Finley
- Dan Firova
- Carl Fischer
- Mike Fischlin
- Eddie Fisher
- Gus Fisher
- Ed Fitz Gerald
- Paul Fitzke
- Al Fitzmorris
- Ryan Flaherty
- Ray Flanigan
- Les Fleming
- **Elmer Flick**
- Jesse Flores
- Estevan Florial
- Gavin Floyd
- Hank Foiles
- Lew Fonseca
- Ted Ford
- Ray Fosse
- Alan Foster
- Ed Foster
- Roy Foster
- Ben Francisco
- Julio Franco
- Terry Francona
- Tito Francona
- George Frazier
- Joe Frazier
- Mike Freeman
- Tyler Freeman
- Vern Freiburger
- Dave Freisleben
- Jim Fridley
- Owen Friend
- Buck Frierson
- Doug Frobel
- David Fry
- Johnson Fry
- Travis Fryman
- Kosuke Fukudome
- Vern Fuller
- Aaron Fultz
- Frank Funk

== G ==
- Hunter Gaddis
- Fabian Gaffke
- Ralph Gagliano
- Milt Galatzer
- Denny Galehouse
- Cam Gallagher
- Dave Gallagher
- Jackie Gallagher
- Shorty Gallagher
- Oscar Gamble
- Ben Gamel
- Chick Gandil
- Bob Garbark
- Karim García
- Mike Garcia
- Larry Gardner
- Ray Gardner
- Rob Gardner
- Ryan Garko
- Wayne Garland
- Perci Garner
- Clarence Garrett
- Justin Garza
- Charlie Gassaway
- Gary Geiger
- Frank Genins
- Jim Gentile
- Greek George
- Lefty George
- George Gerken
- Justin Germano
- Jody Gerut
- Al Gettel
- Gus Getz
- Jason Giambi
- Ian Gibaut
- Gustavo Gil
- Brian Giles
- Johnny Gill
- Connor Gillispie
- Andrés Giménez
- Chris Gimenez
- Tinsley Ginn
- Joe Ginsberg
- Matt Ginter
- Lucas Giolito
- Luke Glavenich
- Jim Gleeson
- Martin Glendon
- Sal Gliatto
- Bill Glynn
- Ed Glynn
- John Gochnauer
- Bill Gogolewski
- Jonah Goldman
- Yan Gomes
- Jeanmar Gómez
- Rubén Gómez
- Rene Gonzales
- Andy González
- Carlos González
- Denny González
- Erik González
- José González
- Juan González
- Orlando González
- Oscar Gonzalez
- Pedro González
- Raúl González
- Lee Gooch
- Wilbur Good
- Dwight Gooden
- Nick Goody
- Don Gordon
- **Joe Gordon**
- Tom Gorzelanny
- Anthony Gose
- Mike Gosling
- Al Gould
- Mauro Gozzo
- Rod Graber
- Tony Graffanino
- Peaches Graham
- Tommy Gramly
- Jack Graney
- Eddie Grant
- George Grant
- Jimmy Grant
- Mudcat Grant
- Mickey Grasso
- Danny Graves
- Gary Gray
- Johnny Gray
- Ted Gray
- Gene Green
- Dave Gregg
- Vean Gregg
- Alfredo Griffin
- Art Griggs
- Bob Grim
- Oscar Grimes
- Jason Grimsley
- Ross Grimsley II
- Marquis Grissom
- Steve Gromek
- Bob Groom
- Ernest Groth
- Harvey Grubb
- Johnny Grubb
- Mark Grudzielanek
- Cecilio Guante
- Preston Guilmet
- Lou Guisto
- Tom Gulley
- Red Gunkel
- Jeremy Guthrie
- Franklin Gutiérrez
- Ricky Gutiérrez
- Brandon Guyer

== H ==
- Eric Haase
- Travis Hafner
- Nick Hagadone
- Rip Hagerman
- Bob Hale
- Odell Hale
- Jimmie Hall
- Mel Hall
- Russ Hall
- John Halla
- Bill Hallman
- Petey Halpin
- Al Halt
- Doc Hamann
- Jack Hamilton
- Steve Hamilton
- Jack Hammond
- Granny Hamner
- Brad Hand
- Rich Hand
- Chris Haney
- Jack Hannahan
- Doug Hansen
- Mel Harder
- Carroll Hardy
- Jack Hardy
- Steve Hargan
- Mike Hargrove
- Spec Harkness
- Tommy Harper
- Toby Harrah
- Billy Harrell
- Ken Harrelson
- Billy Harris
- Bubba Harris
- Joe Harris
- Mickey Harris
- Roric Harrison
- Jack Harshman
- Oscar Harstad
- Bill Hart
- Bruce Hartford
- Grover Hartley
- Bob Hartman
- Luther Harvel
- Zaza Harvey
- Ron Hassey
- Fred Hatfield
- Arthur Hauger
- Joe Hauser
- Brad Havens
- Wynn Hawkins
- Howie Haworth
- Brett Hayes
- Frankie Hayes
- Von Hayes
- Jerad Head
- Jeff Heath
- Neal Heaton
- Austin Hedges
- Mike Hedlund
- Bob Heffner
- Jim Hegan
- Jack Heidemann
- Woodie Held
- Hank Helf
- Russ Heman
- Charlie Hemphill
- Rollie Hemsley
- Bernie Henderson
- George Hendrick
- Harvey Hendrick
- Tim Hendryx
- Dave Hengel
- Phil Hennigan
- Earl Henry
- Sam Hentges
- Matt Herges
- Remy Hermoso
- Anderson Hernández
- Carlos Hernández
- César Hernández
- Jeremy Hernandez
- José Hernández
- Keith Hernandez
- Roberto Hernández
- Roberto Hernández
- Alex Herrera
- Tim Herrin
- Frank Herrmann
- Orel Hershiser
- Otto Hess
- Joe Heving
- Jack Hickey
- Charlie Hickman
- Bob Higgins
- Dennis Higgins
- Mark Higgins
- Oral Hildebrand
- Tom Hilgendorf
- Cam Hill
- Glenallen Hill
- Herbert Hill
- Hugh Hill
- Ken Hill
- Rich Hill
- Shawn Hillegas
- Bill Hinchman
- Harry Hinchman
- Chuck Hinton
- Tommy Hinzo
- Myril Hoag
- Oris Hockett
- Johnny Hodapp
- Gomer Hodge
- Bill Hoffer
- Tex Hoffman
- Kenny Hogan
- Malachi Hogan
- Eddie Hohnhorst
- Dutch Holland
- Todd Hollandsworth
- Dave Hollins
- Ken Holloway
- Tyler Holt
- Don Hood
- Bob Hooper
- Sam Horn
- Tony Horton
- Willie Horton
- Dave Hoskins
- Rhys Hoskins
- TJ House
- Tyler Houston
- Art Houtteman
- Doug Howard
- Ivan Howard
- Spencer Howard
- Thomas Howard
- Dixie Howell
- Red Howell
- Bob Howry
- Dick Howser
- James Hoyt
- Trenidad Hubbard
- Willis Hudlin
- David Huff
- Mike Huff
- Roy Hughes
- Mark Huismann
- Johnny Humphries
- Bill Hunnefield
- Bill Hunter
- Billy Hunter
- Tommy Hunter

== I ==
- Cooper Ingle
- Joe Inglett
- Happy Iott
- Tommy Irwin

== J ==
- Austin Jackson
- Damian Jackson
- Jim Jackson
- Mike Jackson (LHP)
- Mike Jackson (RHP)
- Randy Jackson
- Shoeless Joe Jackson
- Zach Jackson
- Baby Doll Jacobson
- Brook Jacoby
- Jason Jacome
- Big Bill James
- Chris James
- Dion James
- Lefty James
- Charlie Jamieson
- Hi Jasper
- Tex Jeanes
- Mike Jeffcoat
- Reggie Jefferson
- Stan Jefferson
- Dan Jessee
- Johnny Jeter
- Houston Jiménez
- José Jiménez
- Ubaldo Jiménez
- Tommy John
- Alex Johnson
- Bob Johnson
- Chris Johnson
- Cliff Johnson
- Daniel Johnson
- DJ Johnson
- Elliot Johnson
- Jason Johnson
- Jerry Johnson
- Larry Johnson
- Lou Johnson
- Vic Johnson
- Doc Johnston
- Doug Jones
- Hal Jones
- Nolan Jones
- Sad Sam Jones
- Toothpick Sam Jones
- Willie Jones
- Scott Jordan
- Tom Jordan
- **Addie Joss**
- Jeff Juden
- Walt Judnich
- Josh Judy
- Jorge Julio
- Ken Jungels
- Jakob Junis
- David Justice

== K ==
- Ike Kahdot
- Nick Kahl
- George Kahler
- Bob Kaiser
- Jeff Kaiser
- Scott Kamieniecki
- Willie Kamm
- Paul Kardow
- James Karinchak
- Benn Karr
- Steve Karsay
- Marty Kavanagh
- C. J. Kayfus
- Scott Kazmir
- Austin Kearns
- Pat Keedy
- Dave Keefe
- Mike Kekich
- Tom Kelley
- Bob Kelly
- Michael Kelly
- Pat Kelly
- Ken Keltner
- Fred Kendall
- Bill Kennedy
- Bob Kennedy
- Vern Kennedy
- Jerry Kenney
- **Jeff Kent**
- Zak Kent
- Marty Keough
- Jim Kern
- Jack Kibble
- Mike Kilkenny
- Ed Killian
- Jerry Kindall
- **Ralph Kiner**
- Eric King
- Jim King
- Dennis Kinney
- Jason Kipnis
- Wayne Kirby
- Jay Kirke
- Willie Kirkland
- Harry Kirsch
- Garland Kiser
- Ron Kittle
- Malachi Kittridge
- Lou Klein
- Hal Kleine
- Ed Klepfer
- Ed Klieman
- Lou Klimchock
- Steve Kline (LHP)
- Steve Kline (RHP)
- Johnny Klippstein
- Corey Kluber
- Joe Klugmann
- Cotton Knaupp
- Bill Knickerbocker
- Ray Knode
- Masahide Kobayashi
- Elmer Koestner
- Brad Komminsk
- George Kontos
- Larry Kopf
- Mike Koplove
- Casey Kotchman
- George Kottaras
- Kevin Kouzmanoff
- Joe Krakauskas
- Jack Kralick
- Tom Kramer
- Gene Krapp
- Harry Krause
- Rick Kreuger
- Rick Krivda
- Gary Kroll
- John Kroner
- Ernie Krueger
- Art Kruger
- Jason Kubel
- Jack Kubiszyn
- Harvey Kuenn
- Bub Kuhn
- Kenny Kuhn
- Duane Kuiper
- Hal Kurtz
- Bob Kuzava
- Steven Kwan

== L ==
- Bob Lacey
- Candy LaChance
- Guy Lacy
- Aaron Laffey
- **Nap Lajoie**
- Tim Laker
- Ray Lamb
- Otis Lambeth
- Tom Lampkin
- Grover Land
- Jim Landis
- Sam Langford
- Mark Langston
- Matt Langwell
- Matt LaPorta
- Juan Lara
- Greg LaRocca
- Dave LaRoche
- Lyn Lary
- Fred Lasher
- Bill Laskey
- Barry Latman
- Bill Lattimore
- Ramon Laureano
- Ryan Lavarnway
- Bryan Lavastida
- Ron Law
- Jim Lawrence
- Roxie Lawson
- Matt Lawton
- Bill Laxton
- Emil Leber
- Ricky Ledée
- C. C. Lee
- Cliff Lee (OF)
- Cliff Lee (P)
- David Lee
- Leron Lee
- Mike Lee
- Thornton Lee
- Gene Leek
- Paul Lehner
- Norm Lehr
- Nemo Leibold
- Dummy Leitner
- Scott Leius
- Jack Lelivelt
- Johnnie LeMaster
- **Bob Lemon**
- Jim Lemon
- Eddie Leon
- Sandy León
- Joe Leonard
- Dominic Leone
- Jesse Levis
- Dutch Levsen
- Dennis Lewallyn
- Jensen Lewis
- Mark Lewis
- Scott Lewis
- Glenn Liebhardt, Sr.
- Jeff Liefer
- Brent Lillibridge
- Derek Lilliquist
- Carl Lind
- Lyman Linde
- Francisco Lindor
- Bill Lindsay
- Jim Lindsey
- Fred Link
- Larry Lintz
- Bob Lipski
- Joe Lis
- Pete Lister
- Mark Little
- Larry Littleton
- Ben Lively
- Paddy Livingston
- Bobby Locke
- Stu Locklin
- Kenny Lofton
- Boone Logan
- Howard Lohr
- Ron Lolich
- Sherm Lollar
- Al López
- Albie López
- José López
- Luis López
- Marcelino López
- Reynaldo López
- Bris Lord
- Andrew Lorraine
- Torey Lovullo
- Grover Lowdermilk
- Derek Lowe
- Mark Lowe
- John Lowenstein
- Ryan Ludwick
- Matt Luke
- Héctor Luna
- Gordy Lund
- Jack Lundbom
- Harry Lunte
- Al Luplow
- Jordan Luplow
- Billy Lush
- Rube Lutzke
- Russ Lyon

== M ==
- Chuck Machemehl
- Ray Mack
- Felix Mackiewicz
- Clarence Maddern
- Ever Magallanes
- Sal Maglie
- Tom Magrann
- Chris Magruder
- Jim Mahoney
- Luke Maile
- Duster Mails
- Scott Maine
- Hank Majeski
- Candy Maldonado
- Rick Manning
- Jeff Manship
- Jeff Manto
- Kyle Manzardo
- Shaun Marcum
- Roger Maris
- Fred Marsh
- Evan Marshall
- Lou Marson
- Andy Marte
- Billy Martin
- Leonys Martín
- Morrie Martin
- Tom Martin
- Angel Martínez
- Carlos Martínez
- Dennis Martínez
- Joe Martinez
- Michael Martinez
- Sandy Martínez
- Tony Martínez
- Víctor Martínez
- Willie Martínez
- Justin Masterson
- Tom Mastny
- Carl Mathias
- Phil Maton
- Dave Maurer
- Lee Maye
- Jimmy McAleer
- Zach McAllister
- Bake McBride
- Ralph McCabe
- Jack McCarthy
- Kirk McCarty
- Darren McCaughan
- Barney McCosky
- Tommy McCraw
- Frank McCrea
- John McDonald
- Jim McDonnell
- Jack McDowell
- Oddibe McDowell
- Sam McDowell
- Deacon McGuire
- Jim McGuire
- Marty McHale
- Stuffy McInnis
- Hal McKain
- Triston McKenzie
- Mark McLemore
- Cal McLish
- Don McMahon
- Harry McNeal
- Pat McNulty
- George McQuillan
- Luis Medina
- Moxie Meixell
- Francisco Mejía
- J. C. Mejía
- Sam Mele
- Bill Melton
- Oscar Mercado
- Kent Mercker
- Lou Merloni
- Ryan Merritt
- Matt Merullo
- José Mesa
- Bud Messenger
- Parker Messick
- Dewey Metivier
- Catfish Metkovich
- Dutch Meyer
- Dan Miceli
- Jason Michaels
- John Middleton
- Bob Milacki
- Larry Milbourne
- Johnny Miljus
- Andrew Miller
- Bob Miller
- Brad Miller
- Ed Miller
- Jake Miller
- Matt Miller
- Owen Miller
- Ray Miller
- Randy Milligan
- Buster Mills
- Frank Mills
- Jack Mills
- Kevin Millwood
- Al Milnar
- Steve Mingori
- **Minnie Miñoso**
- Dale Mitchell
- Kevin Mitchell
- Willie Mitchell
- Dave Mlicki
- Danny Moeller
- Mike Mohler
- Blas Monaco
- Sid Monge
- Ed Montague
- Leo Moon
- Adam Moore
- Barry Moore
- Earl Moore
- Eddie Moore
- Jim Moore
- Matt Moore
- Andrés Mora
- Billy Moran
- Ed Morgan
- Eli Morgan
- Joe Morgan
- Nyjer Morgan
- Shawn Morimando
- Alvin Morman
- Jeff Moronko
- Cody Morris
- **Jack Morris**
- Max Moroff
- Guy Morton
- Jerry Moses
- Brandon Moss
- Howie Moss
- Don Mossi
- Guillermo Mota
- Edward Mujica
- Terry Mulholland
- Fran Mullins
- Bob Muncrief
- Toru Murata
- Tim Murchison
- David Murphy
- **Eddie Murray**
- Heath Murray
- Ray Murray
- Jeff Mutis
- Glenn Myatt
- Brett Myers
- Elmer Myers
- Aaron Myette

== N ==
- Chris Nabholz
- Lou Nagelsen
- Russ Nagelson
- Charles Nagy
- Bill Nahorodny
- Mike Napoli
- Tyler Naquin
- Hal Naragon
- Ray Narleski
- Ken Nash
- Jaime Navarro
- Bo Naylor
- Josh Naylor
- Mike Naymick
- Thomas Neal
- Cal Neeman
- Jim Neher
- Bernie Neis
- Dave Nelson
- Kyle Nelson
- Rocky Nelson
- Graig Nettles
- Milo Netzel
- Don Newcombe
- **Hal Newhouser**
- Alan Newman
- Simon Nicholls
- Rod Nichols
- Chris Nichting
- Dick Niehaus
- **Phil Niekro**
- Milt Nielsen
- Bob Nieman
- Doug Nikhazy
- Harry Niles
- Rabbit Nill
- Al Nipper
- Ron Nischwitz
- Jayson Nix
- Otis Nixon
- Russ Nixon
- Trot Nixon
- Junior Noboa
- Jhonkensy Noel
- Dickie Noles
- Daniel Norris
- Jim Norris
- Les Nunamaker
- Dom Núñez

== O ==
- Jack O'Brien
- Pete O'Brien (1B)
- Pete O'Brien (2B)
- Paul O'Dea
- John O'Donoghue
- Hal O'Hagan
- Steve O'Neill
- Ted Odenwald
- Blue Moon Odom
- Bryan Oelkers
- Alexi Ogando
- Chad Ogea
- Tomo Ohka
- Bob Ojeda
- Steve Olin
- Dave Oliver
- Gregg Olson
- Ivy Olson
- Tyler Olson
- Eddie Onslow
- Jesse Orosco
- Jorge Orta
- Junior Ortiz
- Luis Ortiz
- Harry Ostdiek
- Dan Otero
- Harry Otis
- Dave Otto
- Johnny Oulliber
- Josh Outman
- Bob Owchinko

== P ==
- Ernie Padgett
- Karl Pagel
- Pat Paige
- **Satchel Paige**
- Richie Palacios
- Lowell Palmer
- Peyton Pallette
- Frank Papish
- Blake Parker
- Harry Parker
- Chad Paronto
- Lance Parrish
- Casey Parsons
- Wes Parsons
- Ben Paschal
- Camilo Pascual
- Mike Paul
- Carl Pavano
- Stan Pawloski
- Mike Paxton
- Alex Pearson
- Monte Pearson
- Hal Peck
- Roger Peckinpaugh
- Gerónimo Peña
- Orlando Peña
- Tony Peña
- Ken Penner
- Jhonny Peralta
- Jack Perconte
- Chris Perez
- Eddie Pérez
- Eduardo Pérez
- Francisco Pérez
- Óliver Pérez
- Rafael Pérez
- Roberto Pérez
- Tony Perezchica
- Broderick Perkins
- Jon Perlman
- Bill Perrin
- George Perring
- Chan Perry
- **Gaylord Perry**
- Herb Perry
- Jim Perry
- Vinnie Pestano
- John Peters
- Rusty Peters
- Cap Peterson
- Fritz Peterson
- Jesse Petty
- Larry Pezold
- Cord Phelps
- Josh Phelps
- Ken Phelps
- Dave Philley
- Adolfo Phillips
- Brandon Phillips
- Bubba Phillips
- Eddie Phillips
- Jason Phillips
- Tom Phillips
- Ollie Pickering
- Marino Pieretti
- Jim Piersall
- Konnor Pilkington
- Horacio Piña
- Lou Piniella
- Vada Pinson
- Stan Pitula
- Juan Pizarro
- Kevin Plawecki
- Zach Plesac
- Eric Plunk
- Adam Plutko
- Ray Poat
- Bud Podbielan
- Johnny Podgajny
- Lou Polchow
- Jim Poole
- Dave Pope
- Dick Porter
- Jay Porter
- Wally Post
- Lou Pote
- Nellie Pott
- Bill Pounds
- Boog Powell
- Ted Power
- Vic Power
- John Powers
- Mike Powers
- Bryan Price
- Jackie Price
- Ron Pruitt
- Yasiel Puig
- Zach Putnam
- Frankie Pytlak

== Q ==
- Cal Quantrill
- Jamie Quirk

== R ==
- Joe Rabbitt
- Ryan Raburn
- Dick Radatz
- Scott Radinsky
- Tom Raftery
- Tom Ragland
- Eric Raich
- Larry Raines
- Jason Rakers
- Alex Ramírez
- Hanley Ramírez
- Harold Ramírez
- José Ramírez
- Manny Ramírez
- Neil Ramírez
- Yohan Ramírez
- Domingo Ramos
- Pedro Ramos
- Wilson Ramos
- Clay Rapada
- Morrie Rath
- Mike Redmond
- Jerry Reed
- Steve Reed
- Rudy Regalado
- Herman Reich
- Duke Reilley
- Tom Reilly
- Art Reinholz
- Pete Reiser
- Bugs Reisigl
- Paul Reuschel
- Anthony Reyes
- Franmil Reyes
- Allie Reynolds
- Bob Reynolds
- Mark Reynolds
- Bob Rhoads
- Arthur Rhodes
- Kevin Rhomberg
- **Sam Rice**
- Denny Riddleberger
- Steve Ridzik
- Paul Rigdon
- Jerrod Riggan
- Juan Rincón
- Ricardo Rincón
- Billy Ripken
- David Riske
- Reggie Ritter
- Jim Rittwage
- Luis Rivas
- René Rivera
- Joe Roa
- Jake Robbins
- Bip Roberts
- Dave Roberts
- Daniel Robertson
- Jeriome Robertson
- Eddie Robinson
- **Frank Robinson**
- Humberto Robinson
- Mickey Rocco
- Brayan Rocchio
- John Rocker
- Bill Rodgers
- Jefry Rodríguez
- Johnathan Rodríguez
- Nerio Rodríguez
- Ricardo Rodríguez
- Rich Rodriguez
- Rick Rodriguez
- Esmil Rogers
- Dave Rohde
- Dan Rohn
- Billy Rohr
- Rich Rollins
- José Román
- Johnny Romano
- Niuman Romero
- Ramón Romero
- Vicente Romo
- Phil Roof
- Adam Rosales
- Buddy Rosar
- Amed Rosario
- Eddie Rosario
- Dave Rosello
- Al Rosen
- Larry Rosenthal
- Don Ross
- Claude Rossman
- Braggo Roth
- Bob Rothel
- Vinny Rottino
- Mike Rouse
- Luther Roy
- Dick Rozek
- Don Rudolph
- Vern Ruhle
- Rich Rundles
- Jack Russell
- Jeff Russell
- Lloyd Russell
- Hank Ruszkowski
- Jim Rutherford
- Buddy Ryan
- Jack Ryan
- Marc Rzepczynski

== S ==
- **CC Sabathia**
- Erik Sabrowski
- Carl Sadler
- Mark Salas
- Danny Salazar
- Chico Salmon
- Jack Salveson
- Ken Sanders
- Nick Sandlin
- Jerry Sands
- Carlos Santana
- Domingo Santana
- Rafael Santana
- José Santiago (1950s)
- José Santiago (2000s)
- Ángel Santos
- Omir Santos
- Scott Sauerbeck
- Germany Schaefer
- Joe Schaffernoth
- Dan Schatzeder
- Frank Scheibeck
- Richie Scheinblum
- Norm Schlueter
- Daniel Schneemann
- Ossee Schreckengost
- Ken Schrom
- Don Schulze
- Bill Schwartz
- Herb Score
- Ed Scott
- Scott Scudder
- Rudy Seánez
- Chris Seddon
- Bob Seeds
- Pat Seerey
- David Seguí
- Kevin Seitzer
- Bill Selby
- Justin Sellers
- Ted Sepkowski
- Paul Sewald
- **Joe Sewell**
- Luke Sewell
- Richie Sexson
- Gordon Seyfried
- Wally Shaner
- Joe Shaute
- Bryan Shaw
- Jeff Shaw
- Danny Shay
- Danny Sheaffer
- Pete Shields
- Jim Shilling
- Ginger Shinault
- Bill Shipke
- Milt Shoffner
- Kelly Shoppach
- J. B. Shuck
- Paul Shuey
- Sonny Siebert
- Brian Sikorski
- Harry Simpson
- Duke Sims
- Tony Sipp
- Carl Sitton
- Grady Sizemore
- Joe Skalski
- Joel Skinner
- Jack Slattery
- Brian Slocum
- Heathcliff Slocumb
- John Smiley
- Al Smith (OF)
- Al Smith (P)
- Bob Smith
- Cade Smith
- Charlie Smith
- Clay Smith
- Elmer Smith
- Joe Smith
- Josh Smith
- Pop-Boy Smith
- Roy Smith (1984-91)
- Roy Smith (2001-02)
- Sherry Smith
- Syd Smith
- Tommy Smith
- Willie Smith
- Cory Snyder
- Earl Snyder
- Russ Snyder
- Bill Sodd
- Moose Solters
- Lary Sorensen
- Zach Sorensen
- Chick Sorrells
- Paul Sorrento
- Allen Sothoron
- Giovanni Soto
- Billy Southworth
- Jeremy Sowers
- **Tris Speaker**
- By Speece
- Horace Speed
- Justin Speier
- Roy Spencer
- Shane Spencer
- Charlie Spikes
- Dan Spillner
- Jerry Spradlin
- Jack Spring
- Steve Springer
- Joe Sprinz
- Freddy Spurgeon
- Eric Stamets
- Jason Stanford
- Lee Stange
- Fred Stanley
- Mike Stanton
- Dolly Stark
- George Starnagle
- Bill Steen
- Red Steiner
- Trevor Stephan
- Bryan Stephens
- Riggs Stephenson
- Dave Stevens
- Lee Stevens
- Lefty Stewart
- Sammy Stewart
- Scott Stewart
- Dick Stigman
- Snuffy Stirnweiss
- Tim Stoddard
- George Stovall
- Jesse Stovall
- Myles Straw
- Oscar Streit
- George Strickland
- Jim Strickland
- Jake Striker
- Brent Strom
- Floyd Stromme
- Peter Strzelecki
- Drew Stubbs
- Ken Suarez
- Charley Suche
- Bill Sudakis
- Billy Sullivan Jr.
- Denny Sullivan
- Jim Sullivan
- Lefty Sullivan
- Homer Summa
- George Susce
- Rick Sutcliffe
- Darrell Sutherland
- Drew Sutton
- Russ Swan
- Anthony Swarzak
- Greg Swindell
- Josh Swindell
- Nick Swisher
- Noah Syndergaard

== T ==
- Pat Tabler
- Kazuhito Tadano
- Mitch Talbot
- Brian Tallet
- Jeff Tam
- Chuck Tanner
- Willie Tasby
- Eddie Taubensee
- Julián Tavárez
- Jackie Tavener
- Beau Taylor
- Ben Taylor
- Dummy Taylor
- Ron Taylor
- Sammy Taylor
- Birdie Tebbetts
- Al Tedrow
- Johnny Temple
- José Tena
- Ralph Terry
- Jake Thielman
- Carl Thomas
- Fay Thomas
- Gorman Thomas
- Lane Thomas
- Pinch Thomas
- Stan Thomas
- Valmy Thomas
- Art Thomason
- **Jim Thome**
- Rich Thompson
- Ryan Thompson
- Jack Thoney
- Andre Thornton
- Luis Tiant
- Dick Tidrow
- Bobby Tiefenauer
- Tom Timmermann
- Ron Tingley
- Joe Tipton
- Jess Todd
- Chick Tolson
- Dick Tomanek
- Josh Tomlin
- Wyatt Toregas
- Red Torkelson
- Rusty Torres
- Touki Toussaint
- Happy Townsend
- Billy Traber
- Jeff Treadway
- Mike Tresh
- Manny Trillo
- Hal Trosky
- Quincy Trouppe
- Eddie Tucker
- Ollie Tucker
- Thurman Tucker
- Tanner Tully
- Eddie Turchin
- Chris Turner
- Matt Turner
- Terry Turner
- Jason Tyner
- Dave Tyriver

== U ==
- Ted Uhlaender
- George Uhle
- Jerry Ujdur
- Willie Underhill
- Del Unser
- Jerry Upp
- Cecil Upshaw
- Willie Upshaw
- Juan Uribe
- Gio Urshela
- Bob Usher
- Dutch Ussat

== V ==
- Mike Vail
- Luis Valbuena
- Efrain Valdez
- Sergio Valdez
- Vito Valentinetti
- George Valera
- Elmer Valo
- Al Van Camp
- Ed Vande Berg
- Johnny Vander Meer
- Dike Varney
- Cal Vasbinder
- Ramón Vázquez
- Jorge Velandia
- Andrew Velazquez
- Otto Vélez
- José Veras
- Mickey Vernon
- Zoilo Versalles
- Tom Veryzer
- José Vidal
- Ron Villone
- Meibrys Viloria
- Rube Vinson
- José Vizcaíno
- Luis Vizcaíno
- Omar Vizquel
- Dave Von Ohlen
- Joe Vosmik
- George Vukovich

== W ==
- Tom Waddell
- Leon Wagner
- Paul Wagner
- Rick Waits
- Howard Wakefield
- Ed Walker
- Gee Walker
- Jerry Walker
- Mike Walker
- Mysterious Walker
- Roy Walker
- Andrew Walters
- Roxy Walters
- Zach Walters
- Bill Wambsganss
- Aaron Ward
- Colby Ward
- Preston Ward
- Turner Ward
- Curt Wardle
- Jimmy Wasdell
- Ron Washington
- Mark Watson
- Frank Wayenberg
- Roy Weatherly
- Dave Weathers
- Floyd Weaver
- Ryan Webb
- Skeeter Webb
- Les Webber
- Mitch Webster
- Ray Webster
- Ralph Weigel
- Dick Weik
- Bob Weiland
- Elmer Weingartner
- Ollie Welf
- Charley Wensloff
- Bill Wertz
- Vic Wertz
- Hi West
- Jake Westbrook
- Wally Westlake
- Gus Weyhing
- Dan Wheeler
- Ed Wheeler
- Pete Whisenant
- Alex White
- Rick White
- Earl Whitehill
- Mark Whiten
- Fred Whitfield
- Ed Whitson
- Kevin Wickander
- Bob Wickman
- Bill Wight
- Sandy Wihtol
- Milt Wilcox
- **Hoyt Wilhelm**
- Denney Wilie
- Eric Wilkins
- Roy Wilkinson
- Ted Wilks
- Jerry Willard
- Brian Williams
- **Dick Williams**
- Eddie Williams
- Gavin Williams
- Matt Williams
- Fred Williams
- Reggie Williams
- Rip Williams
- Stan Williams
- Walt Williams
- Les Willis
- Frank Wills
- Art Wilson
- Enrique Wilson
- Frank Wilson
- Jim Wilson
- Nigel Wilson
- Red Wilson
- Will Wilson
- Fred Winchell
- Ralph Winegarner
- **Dave Winfield**
- George Winn
- Rick Wise
- Bobby Witt
- Nick Wittgren
- Mark Wohlers
- Ed Wojna
- Ernie Wolf
- Roger Wolff
- Blake Wood
- Bob Wood
- Hunter Wood
- Kerry Wood
- Smoky Joe Wood
- Roy Wood
- Steve Woodard
- Hal Woodeshick
- Gene Woodling
- Chuck Workman
- Tim Worrell
- Craig Worthington
- Ab Wright
- Gene Wright
- Jamey Wright
- Jaret Wright
- Lucky Wright
- Joe Wyatt
- Whit Wyatt
- **Early Wynn**

== Y ==
- George Yeager
- Rich Yett
- Earl Yingling
- Mike York
- Elmer Yoter
- Alex Young
- Bobby Young
- Cliff Young
- **Cy Young**
- Ernie Young
- George Young
- Matt Young
- Mike Young
- Carl Yowell

== Z ==
- Bradley Zimmer
- Jimmy Zinn
- Sam Zoldak
- Bill Zuber
- Mike Zunino
- Paul Zuvella
- George Zuverink

== See also ==
- List of Cleveland Guardians managers
- List of Cleveland Guardians owners and executives
- List of Cleveland Guardians seasons
