= 1922 Cleveland Indians season =

1922 Cleveland Indians
- League: American League
- Ballpark: Dunn Field
- City: Cleveland, Ohio
- Owners: Jim Dunn, Estate of Jim Dunn
- Managers: Tris Speaker

The 1922 Cleveland Indians season was a season in American baseball. The team finished fourth in the American League with a record of 78–76, 16 games behind the New York Yankees.

On September 21, manager Tris Speaker used 21 players in total in a 15–5 loss to the Boston Red Sox, which was used as an opportunity for fans to see various minor league prospects.

== Regular season ==
=== Season standings ===
American League
Team	W	L	Pct.	GB	Home	Road
New York Yankees	94	60	.610	—	50‍–‍27	44‍–‍33
St. Louis Browns	93	61	.604	1	54‍–‍23	39‍–‍38
Detroit Tigers	79	75	.513	15	43‍–‍34	36‍–‍41
Cleveland Indians	78	76	.506	16	44‍–‍35	34‍–‍41
Chicago White Sox	77	77	.500	17	43‍–‍34	34‍–‍43
Washington Senators	69	85	.448	25	40‍–‍39	29‍–‍46
Philadelphia Athletics	65	89	.422	29	38‍–‍39	27‍–‍50
Boston Red Sox	61	93	.396	33	31‍–‍42	30‍–‍51

=== Record vs. opponents ===
1922 American League record Sources:
Team	BOS	CWS	CLE	DET	NYY	PHA	SLB	WSH
Boston	—	10–12	6–16	5–17	13–9	10–12	7–15	10–12
Chicago	12–10	—	12–10–1	17–5	9–13	12–10	8–14	7–15
Cleveland	16–6	10–12–1	—	15–7	7–15	11–11	6–16	13–9
Detroit	17–5	5–17	7–15	—	11–11	16–6–1	9–13	14–8
New York	9–13	13–9	15–7	11–11	—	17–5	14–8	15–7
Philadelphia	12–10	10–12	11–11	6–16–1	5–17	—	9–13	12–10
St. Louis	15–7	14–8	16–6	13–9	8–14	13–9	—	14–8
Washington	12–10	15–7	9–13	8–14	7–15	10–12	8–14	—

=== Roster ===
1922 Cleveland Indians
Roster
Pitchers: Jim Bagby; Phil Bedgood; Dan Boone; Stan Coveleski; Logan Drake; George Edmondson; Jim Joe Edwards; Doc Hamann; Tex Jeanes; Dave Keefe; Jim Lindsey; Duster Mails; Dewey Metivier; John Middleton; Guy Morton; Ted Odenwald; Nellie Pott; Joe Shaute; Sherry Smith; Allen Sothoron; George Uhle; George Winn	Catchers: Les Nunamaker; Steve O'Neill; Luke Sewell; Ginger Shinault; Infielders: Uke Clanton; Bill Doran; Larry Gardner; Lou Guisto; Jack Hammond; Ike Kahdot; Stuffy McInnis; Joe Sewell; Chick Sorrells; Riggs Stephenson; Bill Wambsganss	Outfielders: Joe Connolly; Joe Evans; Jack Graney; Charlie Jamieson; Pat McNulty; Joe Rabbitt; Tris Speaker; Homer Summa; Joe Wood	Manager: Tris Speaker; Coaches: Jack McCallister

== Player stats ==
=== Batting ===
==== Starters by position ====
Note: Pos = Position; G = Games played; AB = At bats; H = Hits; Avg. = Batting average; HR = Home runs; RBI = Runs batted in

Pos	Player	G	AB	H	Avg.	HR	RBI
C	Steve O'Neill	133	392	122	.311	2	65
1B	Stuffy McInnis	142	537	164	.305	1	78
2B	Bill Wambsganss	142	538	141	.262	0	47
SS	Joe Sewell	153	558	167	.299	2	83
3B	Larry Gardner	137	470	134	.285	2	68
OF	Tris Speaker	131	426	161	.378	11	71
OF	Charlie Jamieson	145	567	183	.323	3	57
OF	Smoky Joe Wood	142	505	150	.297	8	92

==== Other batters ====
Note: G = Games played; AB = At bats; H = Hits; Avg. = Batting average; HR = Home runs; RBI = Runs batted in

Player	G	AB	H	Avg.	HR	RBI
Riggs Stephenson	86	233	79	.339	2	32
Joe Evans	75	145	39	.269	0	22
Luke Sewell	41	87	23	.264	0	10
Lou Guisto	35	84	21	.250	0	9
Pat McNulty	22	59	16	.271	0	5
Jack Graney	37	58	9	.155	0	2
Homer Summa	12	46	16	.348	1	6
Joe Connolly	12	45	11	.244	0	6
Les Nunamaker	25	43	13	.302	0	7
Ginger Shinault	13	15	2	.133	0	0
Joe Shaute	5	5	0	.000	0	0
Jack Hammond	1	4	1	.250	0	0
Joe Rabbitt	2	3	1	.333	0	0
Bill Doran	3	2	1	.500	0	0
Ike Kahdot	4	2	0	.000	0	0
Chick Sorrells	2	1	0	.000	0	0
Uke Clanton	1	1	0	.000	0	0

=== Pitching ===
==== Starting pitchers ====
Note: G = Games pitched; IP = Innings pitched; W = Wins; L = Losses; ERA = Earned run average; SO = Strikeouts

Player	G	IP	W	L	ERA	SO
George Uhle	50	287.1	22	16	4.07	82
Stan Coveleski	35	276.2	17	14	3.32	98
Guy Morton	38	202.2	14	9	4.00	102
Dan Boone	11	75.1	4	6	4.06	9
Dewey Metivier	2	18.0	2	0	4.50	1
Sherry Smith	2	15.2	1	0	3.45	4
Phil Bedgood	1	9.0	1	0	4.00	5

==== Other pitchers ====
Note: G = Games pitched; IP = Innings pitched; W = Wins; L = Losses; ERA = Earned run average; SO = Strikeouts

Player	G	IP	W	L	ERA	SO
Duster Mails	26	104.0	4	7	5.28	54
Jim Bagby	25	98.1	4	5	6.32	25
Jim Joe Edwards	25	92.2	3	8	4.47	44
Jim Lindsey	29	83.2	4	5	6.02	29
George Winn	8	33.2	1	2	4.54	7
Allen Sothoron	6	25.1	1	3	6.39	8
John Middleton	2	7.1	0	1	7.36	2

==== Relief pitchers ====
Note: G = Games pitched; W = Wins; L = Losses; SV = Saves; ERA = Earned run average; SO = Strikeouts

Player	G	W	L	SV	ERA	SO
Dave Keefe	18	0	0	0	6.19	11
Charlie Jamieson	2	0	0	0	3.18	2
Joe Shaute	2	0	0	0	19.64	3
Nellie Pott	2	0	0	0	31.50	0
George Edmondson	2	0	0	0	9.00	0
Logan Drake	1	0	0	0	3.00	1
Ted Odenwald	1	0	0	0	40.50	2
Doc Hamann	1	0	0	0	inf	0
Tex Jeanes	1	0	0	0	---	0
