= 1898 in baseball =

The following are the baseball events of the year 1898 throughout the world.

== Champions ==
- National League: Boston Beaneaters

== Statistical leaders ==
National League
Stat	Player	Total
AVG	Willie Keeler (BRO)	.385
HR	Jimmy Collins (BSN)	15
RBI	Nap Lajoie (PHI)	127
W	Kid Nichols (BSN)	31
ERA	Clark Griffith (CHI)	1.88
K	Cy Seymour (NYG)	239

== National League final standings ==
National League
Team	W	L	Pct.	GB	Home	Road
Boston Beaneaters	102	47	.685	—	62‍–‍15	40‍–‍32
Baltimore Orioles	96	53	.644	6	58‍–‍15	38‍–‍38
Cincinnati Reds	92	60	.605	11½	58‍–‍28	34‍–‍32
Chicago Orphans	85	65	.567	17½	58‍–‍31	27‍–‍34
Cleveland Spiders	81	68	.544	21	36‍–‍19	45‍–‍49
Philadelphia Phillies	78	71	.523	24	49‍–‍31	29‍–‍40
New York Giants	77	73	.513	25½	45‍–‍28	32‍–‍45
Pittsburgh Pirates	72	76	.486	29½	39‍–‍35	33‍–‍41
Louisville Colonels	70	81	.464	33	43‍–‍34	27‍–‍47
Brooklyn Bridegrooms	54	91	.372	46	30‍–‍41	24‍–‍50
Washington Senators	51	101	.336	52½	34‍–‍44	17‍–‍57
St. Louis Browns	39	111	.260	63½	20‍–‍44	19‍–‍67

Locations of teams for the 1898 National League season
National League

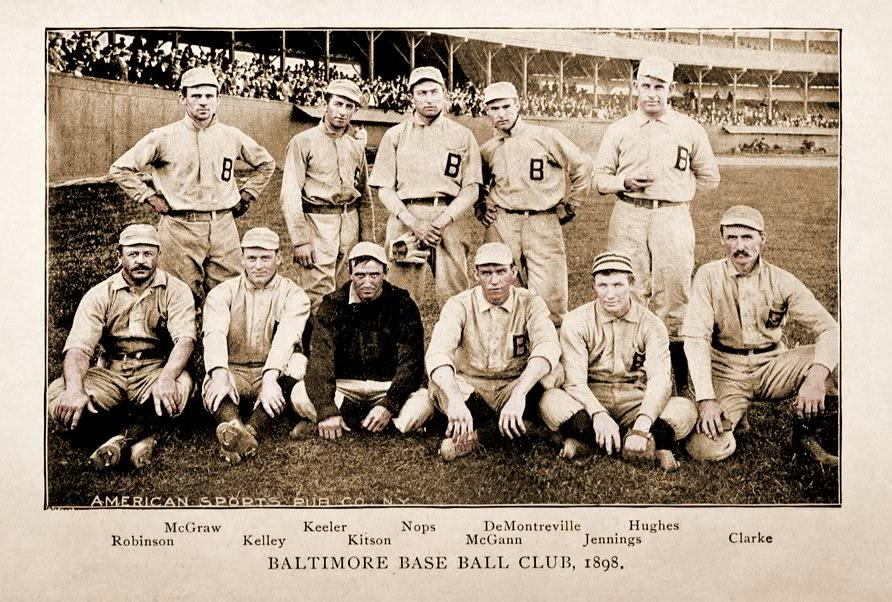
1898 Baltimore Orioles

== Events ==
- April 3 – Jack Clements, now with St. Louis, is the first southpaw to catch in 1,000 MLB games.
- April 21 – Philadelphia Phillies pitcher Bill Duggleby hits a grand slam in his first major league at-bat. No one else will accomplish that feat until Jeremy Hermida in 2005.
- April 22 – This day in baseball would see two no-hitters. First, Ted Breitenstein would throw the second no-hitter of his career, as the Cincinnati Reds would defeat the Pittsburgh Pirates, 11–0. Meanwhile, Jay Hughes would toss a no-hitter for the Baltimore Orioles in a 5–0 win over the Boston Beaneaters. This is the first time in Major League history that two no-hitters would be thrown on the same day. It would not happen again until Dave Stewart and Fernando Valenzuela turned the trick on June 29, 1990.
- May 10 – The Washington Senators released catcher Roger Bresnahan.
- July 5 – Lizzie Arlington becomes the first woman to play in organized baseball as she pitches for the Reading Coal Heavers of the Atlantic League. She hurled the final inning of that game and gave up two hits and a walk but did not allow a run. Some claim she also pitched in exhibition games after being hired by Ed Barrow, the league's president.
- July 8 – Red Donahue tosses a no-hitter in a 5–0 Philadelphia Phillies victory over the Baltimore Orioles.
- August 21 – In the second game of a doubleheader, Walter Thornton of the Chicago Orphans pitches a 2–0 no-hitter against the Brooklyn Bridegrooms.
- December 1 – New York Giants president Andrew Freedman renews his team lease on the Polo Grounds for the next 10 years.

== Births ==
=== January ===
- January 5 – Riggs Stephenson
- January 10
  - Fats Jenkins
  - Ed Stauffer
- January 11 – Gene Lansing
- January 12
  - George Knothe
  - Rip Wade
- January 14 – Dick Wheeler
- January 18 – John Woods
- January 21 – John Mohardt
- January 23 – Speed Walker
- January 24 – Cliff Heathcote
- January 28
  - Jim Bishop
  - Bill Snyder
- January 29 – Dick Burrus
- January 31 – Webb Schultz

=== February ===
- February 1 – Bud Messenger
- February 4
  - Johnny Mann
  - John Perrin
- February 9 – Chink Taylor
- February 15 – Bobby LaMotte
- February 19 – Uke Clanton
- February 26
  - Frank Callaway
  - Butch Glass
  - Lee Thompson
- February 28 – Jake Miller

=== March ===
- March 2 – Rip Wheeler
- March 5 – Bill Grevell
- March 6 – Roy Hansen
- March 8 – Phil Bedgood
- March 10 – Frank Loftus
- March 15
  - Hal Kime
  - Rosy Ryan
- March 22 – Luke Urban
- March 28 – Moses J. Yellow Horse

=== April ===
- April 10 – Tom Jenkins
- April 14 – Jess Doyle
- April 20 – Johnny Wertz
- April 22 – Tom Long
- April 23 – Charlie Dorman
- April 24 – Andy Cooper
- April 25 – Red Thomas
- April 29
  - Tom Glass
  - Dutch Levsen

=== May ===
- May 2 – Lucas Turk
- May 6
  - Dewey Metivier
  - Al Wingo
- May 9 – George Durning
- May 12 – Earl McNeely
- May 18 – Harvey MacDonald
- May 24 – Dennis Burns
- May 26 – Milt Steengrafe
- May 28 – Claude Davenport

=== June ===
- June 1 – Duke Sedgwick
- June 14 – Bill Doran
- June 20 – Duke Shirey
- June 21 – Spencer Adams
- June 29 – Jimmie Long

=== July ===
- July 4 – Bobby Murray
- July 10 – Dick Lundy
- July 11 – Joe Batchelder
- July 14 – Happy Chandler
- July 22 – Joe Bratcher
- July 27
  - Benny Bengough
  - Zack Taylor
- July 28 – Paul McCullough

=== August ===
- August 2 – Emmett Bowles
- August 7 – Oscar Levis
- August 8 – John Slappey
- August 14 – Bill Clowers
- August 17 – Bill Pertica
- August 18
  - Hal Goldsmith
  - Bill Knowlton
- August 24 – John Monroe
- August 27
  - Clarence Fisher
  - Frank Wayenberg
- August 28 – Charlie Grimm
- August 29 – Hap Collard
- August 30 – Kiki Cuyler
- August 31 – Sarge Connally

=== September ===
- September 1 – Ed Goebel
- September 9 – Frankie Frisch
- September 13 – Curt Fullerton
- September 16 – Al Lefevre
- September 18 – George Uhle
- September 20 – Chuck Dressen
- September 23
  - Hod Lisenbee
  - George Murray
- September 27 – Bill Clarkson
- September 29 – Joe Matthews

=== October ===
- October 4 – Frank McCue
- October 7 – Joe Giard
- October 9 – Joe Sewell
- October 17 – Clint Blume
- October 26 – Roy Moore
- October 30
  - Jesse Fowler
  - Bill Terry

=== November ===
- November 3 – Homer Summa
- November 7 – Mike Pasquella
- November 11 – Pie Traynor
- November 14 – Claude Willoughby
- November 15 – Broadway Jones
- November 19 – Harry Courtney
- November 20 – Tim McNamara
- November 21 – Walter Zink
- November 26 – John Kerr
- November 29 – Red Shea
- November 30
  - Lou Bauer
  - Firpo Marberry

=== December ===
- December 1 – Charlie High
- December 2 – Hal Leathers
- December 4 – Doc Bass
- December 14 – Maurice Archdeacon
- December 16
  - Dee Cousineau
  - Frank Shellenback
- December 17
  - Red Lutz
  - Oscar Tuero
- December 19 – Lou Koupal
- December 23 – Hinkey Haines
- December 25 – Earl Kunz
- December 28 – Bill Kelly

== Deaths ==
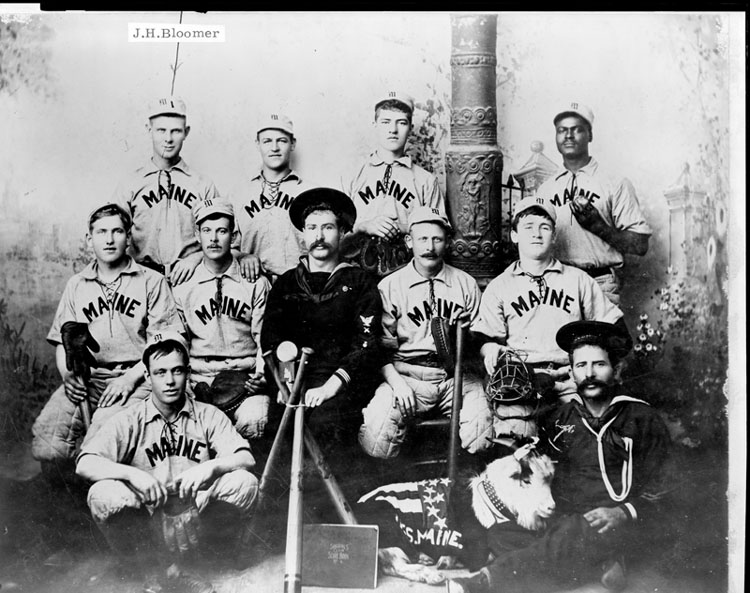
USS Maine baseball team, 1898, shortly after winning the Navy baseball championship. The entire team was killed save one in February 1898.

- January 4 – Charlie Byrne, 54, co-founder of the franchise that became the Brooklyn Dodgers (1883), manager of the "Brooklyns" from June 15, 1885, through 1887, and co-owner until his death.
- January 28 – Ned Connor, 48, utility player for the 1871 New York Haymakers.
- February 25 – Tom Power (?), first baseman.
- March 29 – Tony Hellman, 36, catcher.
- April 13 – Charlie McCullough, 32, pitcher.
- April 14 – Jiggs Parrott, 26, infielder.
- April 17 – Bobby Mathews, 46, pitcher who won 297 games, 131 of them in the National Association, in a career that ran from 1871 to 1887, including the first professional league game victory in 1871, and consecutive 30-win seasons for the Philadelphia Athletics from 1883 to 1885.
- June 4 – Harry Smith, 42, infielder.
- June 23 – William Rexter, 48, outfielder.
- August 2 – Val Robinson, 50, outfielder.
- September 21 – Bill Tierney, 40, first baseman and outfielder.
- October 5 – John Richmond, 43, shortstop and center fielder for seven teams during his eight seasons from 1875 to 1885.
- October 20 – Curry Foley, 42, Irish outfielder/first baseman/pitcher who played from 1879 through 1883 for the Boston Red Caps and Buffalo Bisons National League teams, and the first major league player ever to hit for the cycle (May 25, 1882).
- November 21 – Bill Hague, 46, third baseman from 1875 to 1879.
- November 23 – Mother Watson, 33, pitcher.
- December 27 – John Sneed, 37, outfielder.
- December 30 – Bill Stearns, 45, pitcher for several National Association teams from 1871 to 1875.
- December 31 – Martin Duke, 31, pitcher.
