= 1923 Cleveland Indians season =

1923 Cleveland Indians
- League: American League
- Ballpark: Dunn Field
- City: Cleveland, Ohio
- Owners: Estate of Jim Dunn
- Managers: Tris Speaker

The 1923 Cleveland Indians season was a season in American baseball. The team finished third in the American League with a record of 82–71, 16½ games behind the New York Yankees.

The Indians beat the Boston Red Sox 27–3 on July 7; this is the most runs scored in a game by a major league team without hitting a home run (1901 onwards).

== Regular season ==
=== Season standings ===
American League
Team	W	L	Pct.	GB	Home	Road
New York Yankees	98	54	.645	—	46‍–‍30	52‍–‍24
Detroit Tigers	83	71	.539	16	45‍–‍32	38‍–‍39
Cleveland Indians	82	71	.536	16½	42‍–‍36	40‍–‍35
Washington Senators	75	78	.490	23½	43‍–‍34	32‍–‍44
St. Louis Browns	74	78	.487	24	40‍–‍36	34‍–‍42
Philadelphia Athletics	69	83	.454	29	34‍–‍41	35‍–‍42
Chicago White Sox	69	85	.448	30	30‍–‍45	39‍–‍40
Boston Red Sox	61	91	.401	37	37‍–‍40	24‍–‍51

=== Record vs. opponents ===
1923 American League record Sources:
Team	BOS	CWS	CLE	DET	NYY	PHA	SLB	WSH
Boston	—	9–13	10–12	10–12–1	8–14	13–7	4–18–1	7–15
Chicago	13–9	—	9–13	9–13	7–15	10–12	11–11–1	10–12–1
Cleveland	12–10	13–9	—	9–13	12–10	12–10	14–8	10–11
Detroit	12–10–1	13–9	13–9	—	10–12	12–10	12–10	11–11
New York	14–8	15–7	10–12	12–10	—	16–6	15–5	16–6
Philadelphia	7–13	12–10	10–12	10–12	6–16	—	9–13	15–7–1
St. Louis	18–4–1	11–11–1	8–14	10–12	5–15	13–9	—	9–13
Washington	15–7	12–10–1	11–10	11–11	6–16	7–15–1	13–9	—

=== Roster ===
1923 Cleveland Indians
Roster
Pitchers: Phil Bedgood; Dan Boone; Stan Coveleski; Logan Drake; George Edmondson; Jim Joe Edwards; Johnson Fry; Dutch Levsen; Dewey Metivier; Guy Morton; Joe Shaute; Sherry Smith; Jim Sullivan; George Uhle; George Winn	Catchers: Glenn Myatt; Steve O'Neill; Luke Sewell; Infielders: Frank Brower; Larry Gardner; Lou Guisto; Ray Knode; Rube Lutzke; Joe Sewell; Riggs Stephenson; Bill Wambsganss	Outfielders: Sumpter Clarke; Joe Connolly; Jackie Gallagher; Tom Gulley; Charlie Jamieson; Wally Shaner; Tris Speaker; Homer Summa; Other batters: Kenny Hogan	Manager: Tris Speaker; Coaches: Jack McCallister; Frank Roth

== Player stats ==
=== Batting ===
==== Starters by position ====
Note: Pos = Position; G = Games played; AB = At bats; H = Hits; Avg. = Batting average; HR = Home runs; RBI = Runs batted in

Pos	Player	G	AB	H	Avg.	HR	RBI
C	Steve O'Neill	113	330	82	.248	0	50
1B	Frank Brower	126	397	113	.285	16	66
2B	Bill Wambsganss	101	345	100	.290	1	59
SS	Joe Sewell	153	553	195	.353	3	109
3B	Rube Lutzke	143	511	131	.256	3	65
OF	Tris Speaker	150	574	218	.380	17	130
OF	Homer Summa	137	525	172	.328	3	69
OF	Charlie Jamieson	152	644	222	.345	2	51

==== Other batters ====
Note: G = Games played; AB = At bats; H = Hits; Avg. = Batting average; HR = Home runs; RBI = Runs batted in

Player	G	AB	H	Avg.	HR	RBI
Riggs Stephenson	91	301	96	.319	5	65
Glenn Myatt	92	220	63	.286	3	40
Lou Guisto	40	144	26	.181	0	18
Joe Connolly	52	109	33	.303	3	25
Larry Gardner	52	79	20	.253	0	12
Ray Knode	22	38	11	.289	2	4
Luke Sewell	10	10	2	.200	0	1
Wally Shaner	3	4	1	.250	0	0
Tom Gulley	2	3	1	.333	0	0
Sumpter Clarke	1	3	0	.000	0	0
Jackie Gallagher	1	1	1	1.000	0	0
Kenny Hogan	1	0	0	----	0	0

=== Pitching ===
==== Starting pitchers ====
Note: G = Games pitched; IP = Innings pitched; W = Wins; L = Losses; ERA = Earned run average; SO = Strikeouts

Player	G	IP	W	L	ERA	SO
George Uhle	54	357.2	26	16	3.77	109
Stan Coveleski	33	228.0	13	14	2.76	54

==== Other pitchers ====
Note: G = Games pitched; IP = Innings pitched; W = Wins; L = Losses; ERA = Earned run average; SO = Strikeouts

Player	G	IP	W	L	ERA	SO
Jim Joe Edwards	38	179.1	10	10	3.71	68
Joe Shaute	33	172.0	10	8	3.51	61
Guy Morton	33	129.1	6	6	4.24	54
Dewey Metivier	26	73.1	4	2	6.50	9
Dan Boone	27	70.1	4	6	6.01	15
Phil Bedgood	9	18.2	0	2	5.30	7

==== Relief pitchers ====
Note: G = Games pitched; W = Wins; L = Losses; SV = Saves; ERA = Earned run average; SO = Strikeouts

Player	G	W	L	SV	ERA	SO
Logan Drake	4	0	0	0	4.15	2
Jim Sullivan	3	0	1	0	14.40	4
Dutch Levsen	3	0	0	0	0.00	1
George Edmondson	1	0	0	0	11.25	0
Johnson Fry	1	0	0	0	12.27	0
George Winn	1	0	0	0	0.00	0
