= Doc Hamann =

American baseball player (1900–1973)

- Pitcher
- Born: December 21, 1900; New Ulm, Minnesota, U.S.
- Died: January 11, 1973 (aged 72); Bayside, Wisconsin, U.S.
- Batted: Right Threw: Right

MLB debut
- September 21, 1922, for the Cleveland Indians

Last MLB appearance
- September 21, 1922, for the Cleveland Indians

MLB statistics
- Win–loss record: 0–0
- Earned run average: INF
- Strikeouts: 0
- Stats at Baseball Reference

Teams
- Cleveland Indians (1922)

Elmer Joseph "Doc" Hamann (December 21, 1900 – January 11, 1973) was an American Major League Baseball player. He only appeared in one game, a 15–5 loss to the Boston Red Sox while pitching for the Cleveland Indians on September 21, 1922. Hamann co-holds a dubious record which can never be broken; since Hamann faced seven hitters and did not record a single out, he retired with a lifetime earned run average (ERA) of infinity.

Hamann was one of a group of players that Indians player-manager Tris Speaker sent in partway through the game on September 21, 1922, done as an opportunity for fans to see various minor league prospects. Also playing his only ML game that day was first baseman Uke Clanton. For shortstop Chick Sorrells, third baseman Ike Kahdot and left fielder Joe Rabbitt, all of whom had made between 1–3 appearances earlier in the month, this would also mark the final major league game of their careers.

Hamann entered the game in the ninth inning, taking over from Logan Drake, who was also making his major league debut. (Drake would pitch 10 games in the majors, through 1924.) With the Indians already trailing 9–5, Hamann walked Johnny Mitchell and Ed Chaplin, then hit opposing pitcher Jack Quinn. He followed that up with a walk to Mike Menosky, forcing in a run. Elmer Miller then tripled to clear the bases, and George Burns singled Miller home. Only after Del Pratt followed with another single did manager Tris Speaker pull Hamann, who also threw a wild pitch in what was his only major league appearance. Burns also eventually came around to score, for the sixth and final run charged to Hamann. In addition to his infinite ERA, Hamann holds the record for most batters faced in a career without recording an out.

His appearance with the Indians was apparently his only one in a pro baseball game; there is no record of Hamann ever playing in the minor leagues. Before pitching for the Indians, Hamann played semi-pro baseball in New Ulm, Minnesota. He died more than a half-century later, in 1973.

== Sources ==
- Career statistics from Baseball Reference · Retrosheet · Baseball Almanac
