= Metivier =

Metivier is a surname. Notable people with the surname include:

- Dewey Metivier (1898–1947), American baseball player
- Nina Metivier (fl. 2014), British screenwriter
