= 1906 Cleveland Naps season =

1906 Cleveland Naps
- League: American League
- Ballpark: League Park
- City: Cleveland, Ohio
- Record: 89–64 (.582)
- League place: 5th
- Owners: Charles Somers
- Managers: Nap Lajoie

The 1906 Cleveland Naps season was a season in American baseball. The team finished third in the American League with a record of 89–64, 5 games behind the Chicago White Sox.

== Regular season ==
=== Season standings ===
American League
Team	W	L	Pct.	GB	Home	Road
Chicago White Sox	93	58	.616	—	54‍–‍23	39‍–‍35
New York Highlanders	90	61	.596	3	53‍–‍23	37‍–‍38
Cleveland Naps	89	64	.582	5	47‍–‍30	42‍–‍34
Philadelphia Athletics	78	67	.538	12	48‍–‍23	30‍–‍44
St. Louis Browns	76	73	.510	16	40‍–‍34	36‍–‍39
Detroit Tigers	71	78	.477	21	42‍–‍34	29‍–‍44
Washington Senators	55	95	.367	37½	33‍–‍41	22‍–‍54
Boston Americans	49	105	.318	45½	22‍–‍54	27‍–‍51

=== Record vs. opponents ===
1906 American League record Sources:
Team	BOS	CWS	CLE	DET	NYH	PHA	SLB	WSH
Boston	—	4–18	8–14	10–12	5–17–1	8–14	5–17	9–13
Chicago	18–4	—	12–10–1	11–11	12–10–1	12–9	13–7–1	15–7
Cleveland	8–14	10–12–1	—	14–8–1	10–11–1	12–10–1	14–8	15–7
Detroit	12–10	11–11	8–14–1	—	11–11	6–13	9–13–1	14–6
New York	17–5–1	10–12–1	11–10–1	11–11	—	13–8	13–8–1	15–7
Philadelphia	14–8	9–12	10–12–1	13–6	8–13	—	9–11–2	15–5–1
St. Louis	17–5	7–13–1	8–14	13–9–1	8–13–1	11–9–2	—	12–10
Washington	13–9	7–15	7–15	6–14	7–15	5–15–1	10–12	—

=== Roster ===
1906 Cleveland Naps
Roster
Pitchers: Bill Bernhard; Harry Eells; Otto Hess; Addie Joss; Glenn Liebhardt; Earl Moore; Bob Rhoads; Happy Townsend	Catchers: Harry Bemis; Fritz Buelow; Nig Clarke; Malachi Kittridge; Infielders: Jap Barbeau; Bill Bradley; Nap Lajoie; Claude Rossman; Bill Shipke; George Stovall; Terry Turner	Outfielders: Harry Bay; Joe Birmingham; Ben Caffyn; Bunk Congalton; Elmer Flick; Jim Jackson	Manager: Nap Lajoie

== Player stats ==
=== Batting ===
==== Starters by position ====
Note: Pos = Position; G = Games played; AB = At bats; H = Hits; Avg. = Batting average; HR = Home runs; RBI = Runs batted in

Pos	Player	G	AB	H	Avg.	HR	RBI
C	Harry Bemis	93	297	82	.276	2	30
1B	Claude Rossman	118	396	122	.308	1	53
2B	Nap Lajoie	152	602	214	.355	0	91
SS	Terry Turner	147	584	170	.291	2	62
3B	Bill Bradley	82	302	83	.275	2	25
OF	Elmer Flick	157	624	194	.311	1	62
OF	Jim Jackson	105	374	80	.214	0	38
OF	Bunk Congalton	117	419	134	.320	3	50

==== Other batters ====
Note: G = Games played; AB = At bats; H = Hits; Avg. = Batting average; HR = Home runs; RBI = Runs batted in

Player	G	AB	H	Avg.	HR	RBI
George Stovall	116	443	121	.273	0	37
Harry Bay	68	280	77	.275	0	14
Nig Clarke	57	179	64	.358	1	21
Jap Barbeau	42	129	25	.194	0	12
Ben Caffyn	30	103	20	.194	0	3
Fritz Buelow	34	86	14	.163	0	7
Joe Birmingham	10	40	11	.275	0	6
Malachi Kittridge	5	10	1	.100	0	0
Bill Shipke	2	6	0	.000	0	0

=== Pitching ===
==== Starting pitchers ====
Note: G = Games pitched; IP = Innings pitched; W = Wins; L = Losses; ERA = Earned run average; SO = Strikeouts

Player	G	IP	W	L	ERA	SO
Otto Hess	43	333.2	20	17	1.83	167
Bob Rhoads	38	315.0	22	10	1.80	89
Addie Joss	34	282.0	21	9	1.72	106
Bill Bernhard	31	255.1	16	15	2.54	85
Happy Townsend	17	92.2	3	7	2.91	31
Glenn Liebhardt	2	18.0	2	0	1.50	9

==== Other pitchers ====
Note: G = Games pitched; IP = Innings pitched; W = Wins; L = Losses; ERA = Earned run average; SO = Strikeouts

Player	G	IP	W	L	ERA	SO
Harry Eells	14	86.1	4	5	2.61	35
Earl Moore	5	29.2	1	1	3.94	8
