= Nellie Pott =

American baseball player (1899–1963)

- Pitcher
- Born: July 16, 1899; Cincinnati, Ohio, U.S.
- Died: December 3, 1963 (aged 64); Cincinnati, Ohio, U.S.
- Batted: Left Threw: Left

MLB debut
- April 19, 1922, for the Cleveland Indians

Last MLB appearance
- May 1, 1922, for the Cleveland Indians

MLB statistics
- Win–loss record: 0–0
- Earned run average: 31.50
- Strikeouts: 0
- Stats at Baseball Reference

Teams
- Cleveland Indians (1922)

Nelson Adolph Pott (July 16, 1899 – December 3, 1963) was an American Major League Baseball pitcher who played for one season. He pitched in two games for the Cleveland Indians during the 1922 Cleveland Indians season.
