= Wayne Cage =

American baseball player (born 1951)

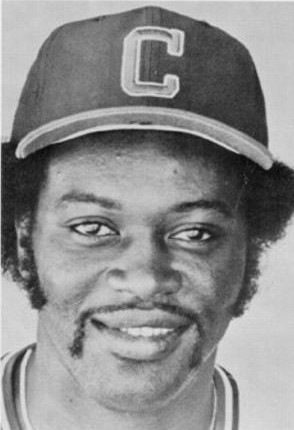
- Cage in 1979
- Designated hitter / First baseman
- Born: November 23, 1951 (age 74); Monroe, Louisiana, U.S.
- Batted: Left Threw: Left

MLB debut
- April 22, 1978, for the Cleveland Indians

Last MLB appearance
- September 30, 1979, for the Cleveland Indians

MLB statistics
- Batting average: .240
- Home runs: 5
- Runs batted in: 19

NPB statistics
- Batting average: .235
- Home runs: 62
- Runs batted in: 146
- Stats at Baseball Reference

Teams
- Cleveland Indians (1978–1979); Hankyu Braves (1981–1982)

Wayne Levell Cage (born November 23, 1951) is an American former professional baseball player.

He attended Ruston High School in Ruston, Louisiana, where the baseball team was undefeated his junior and senior seasons. He also played basketball. The Cleveland Indians drafted him in the third round of the 1971 Major League Baseball draft as a pitcher. He converted to a first baseman in 1973 due to a sore throwing arm. In 1977, he set a Toledo Mud Hens record with 30 doubles and was an International League All-Star. He reached the majors the following season, batting .245 with 4 home runs in 36 games in 1978. The next year was his final season in the majors. He batted .232 with 1 home run in 29 games for Cleveland in 1979. Cage later wrote that Yankee Stadium was his favorite ballpark to play in.

After playing in the minors all of 1980, a frustrated Cage refused to sign a contract with Cleveland in February 1981. Cleveland traded him to the Seattle Mariners on March 26 for outfielder Rod Craig, but Seattle sold him to the Hankyu Braves of Nippon Professional Baseball on April 2. He played for the Braves in 1981 and 1982, clubbing 62 home runs over two years. In 1983, he played for Leones de Yucatan in the Mexican League. He stayed in Mexico the following year, playing for the Rojos del Aguila de Veracruz.

Cage was married and had three children, as of 1978.
