= Rod Craig =

American baseball player (1958–2013)

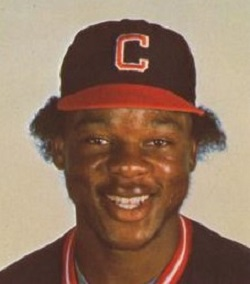
- Outfielder
- Born: January 12, 1958; Los Angeles, California, U.S.
- Died: August 17, 2013 (aged 55); Los Angeles, California, U.S.
- Batted: Both Threw: Right

MLB debut
- September 11, 1979, for the Seattle Mariners

Last MLB appearance
- May 5, 1986, for the Chicago White Sox

MLB statistics
- Batting average: .256
- Home runs: 3
- Runs batted in: 27
- Stats at Baseball Reference

Teams
- Seattle Mariners (1979–1980); Cleveland Indians (1982); Chicago White Sox (1986)

Rodney Paul Craig (January 12, 1958 – August 17, 2013) was an American Major League Baseball outfielder who played for four seasons. Born in Los Angeles, he played for the Seattle Mariners from 1979 to 1980, Cleveland Indians in 1982, and Chicago White Sox in 1986. Craig was stabbed to death at a homeless encampment in Los Angeles.

== Early life ==
Craig was born in Los Angeles and grew up in the area. He attended Narbonne High School. His teammates said that he was a talented running back, but he quit the football team at Narbonne because he thought that racism was limiting his playing time. He focused on baseball, which he played at San Jacinto College in Texas.

== Career ==
He was signed by the expansion Seattle Mariners organization in 1977. In 1979, he became the first prospect signed by that organization to make it to the major leagues. He played in 16 games for the Mariners that year, and he batted .385. He hit safely in 14 of those 16 games.

In 1980, Craig began the season as a starting outfielder. "Seattle is handing Rodney Craig the right-field job if his tempestuous attitude doesn't ruin him," wrote Peter Gammons that January. After his playing time was limited to 70 games by injuries that season, Craig was traded to the Cleveland Indians for Wayne Cage in March 1981. Craig did not play in the major leagues in 1981, and he appeared in only 49 Indians games in 1982.

Craig spent several more years in the minor leagues, and he last appeared in the major league for ten games with the Chicago White Sox in 1986. He then played in the Mexican League, and he appeared in a few games for the Salinas Spurs of the California League in 1990.

== Later life ==
After leaving baseball, Craig struggled with mental illness and became homeless. After a 2004 fight in which he struck a homeless person with a rock, he was sent to a state psychiatric hospital. On August 17, 2013, Craig got into a fight with two men at an encampment for homeless people in Los Angeles. One of the two men, Billy Morales, had a knife and fatally stabbed Craig. Morales was convicted of second-degree murder on January 15, 2015 and sentenced to 16 years to life in prison for Craig's murder on March 23, 2015.
