= Red Thomas =

American baseball player (1898–1962)

- Center fielder
- Born: April 25, 1898; Lindsey, Ohio, U.S.
- Died: March 22, 1962 (aged 63); Fremont, Ohio, U.S.
- Batted: Right Threw: Right

MLB debut
- September 13, 1921, for the Chicago Cubs

Last MLB appearance
- September 28, 1921, for the Chicago Cubs

MLB statistics
- Batting average: .267
- Home runs: 1
- Runs batted in: 5
- Stats at Baseball Reference

Teams
- Chicago Cubs (1921)

Robert William "Red" Thomas (April 25, 1898 – March 22, 1962) was an American center fielder in Major League Baseball. He played for the Chicago Cubs.

== Early years ==
Born in Lindsey, Ohio in 1898, Robert W. Thomas was a son of Ohio natives Mary Ann Thomas (1857-1924) and William A. Thomas (1861-1847), who was the adopted son of Samuel Transue (1832-1926), a native of Easton, Pennsylvania who had served with the 47th Pennsylvania Volunteer Infantry during the American Civil War.

The family moved to Fremont, Ohio when Red Thomas was young. After completing two years of junior high school he took a job at the Herbrand Corporation, a manufacturer of vehicle springs and suspension systems, instead of continuing to high school.

== Baseball career ==
Thomas began his baseball career as a ballplayer with the Industrial League in Fremont. In 1919, he joined a professional team in Little Rock, Arkansas that was part of minor league baseball's Southern Association. Departing from that team in June 1919, he moved on to a Western Association team based in Okmulgee, Oklahoma, staying there until June 1920 when he joined the team in Henryetta, Oklahoma as a catcher who batted .329. After switching to the outfield in 1921 and racking up a batting average of .349, he signed a contract with the Chicago Cubs for US$350 per month. Documenting the early success of Thomas with the Cubs, The Daily Oklahoman reported in its September 26, 1921 edition:

"Red Thomas, Chicago's recruit outfielder from Henryetta, Okla., was the hero in the double victory of Chicago over Boston today ... going twelve innings, and the scores being 4 to 3 and 8 to 7. Thomas' single in the last inning of the initial contest sent two runs home for a victory, and he started the rally in the last inning of the second contest with a double, and scored on a single...."

Interviewed in 1927 for a Fremont Messenger article, Thomas described his initial experience with the Cubs:

"When I appeared on the field for my first major league game against Brooklyn I was the proudest fellow in the land. My dream way back there in the old Lindsey town was realized. I was a major leaguer."

After batting .356 over 17 games for the team, he struggled with illness during the Cubs' spring training on Catalina Island, California in 1922, and was sent back to the minor league team in Henryetta on May 1 of that year, but was not well enough to return to the lineup until August. Thomas quickly displayed his batting and fielding prowess, however, in a game against Springfield. According to the September 1, 2022 edition of The Springfield News:

"Red Thomas ... center fielder with the Hens, who had a fling ... in the National league last season, when he was sold to the Chicago Cubs, had more to do with the victory than any other member of [the Henryetta] crew. Red was at bat five times and drove out a home run, three bagger, two singles, scored three runs and drove in two others. In addition to this, he made six nice catches in deep center field.... [After] a relief hurler [was called in] in the seventh inning and ... allowed but one hit ... 'Red' Thomas decided to connect for his home run.... It remained for Mickey Hughes, recent member of the Midget brigade, to start the trouble. The little guardian ... who went to Henryetta when Foster came here as manager of the Midgets, opened the first inning with a hard blow to center field for three bases. 'Red' Thomas followed with a single, scoring Hughes. Thomas proceeded to steal second base and, when Daniels singled, he came home on the play. Springfield evened the score in their half of the first inning.... Things went along very smooth until the fourth inning when Henryetta again took a one-run lead. Shortstop Viveros hit for two bases and scored.... The visitors staged their one grand and glorious rally in the fifth inning. Because of his rather ambitious three-bagger in the first inning, Hughes was given free transportation to first base. 'Red' Thomas again came to his rescue, this time with a three-bagger, sending the little St. Louis Irishman home. Henninger hit to Grimm, Thomas coming home on the play. Daniels singled and went to second on an infield out. Viveros singled, scoring Daniels. Thomas drove out a horn run in the seventh inning to make the final Hen score."

Despite that success, Thomas ultimately only batted .270 during his shortened season with the Henryetta Hens. Returning to the team for another season in 1923, he faced new turmoil when that team folded and his contract was sold to the minor league team in Okmulgee, where he had played earlier in his career. Even though he hit .315 there, he was traded to the minor league team in Augusta, Georgia as part of a five-player deal, but still found no job security. After working his way through a series of Southern League teams, including the Asheville Tourists and Atlanta Crackers, he returned home to Fremont, Ohio in the 1930s, and resumed his semi-professional career with the Industrial League.

== Death and interment ==
Thomas's wife, Marie (b.1902) died on February 27, 1950. Thomas died twelve years later in Fremont, Ohio on March 21, 1962, aged 63. They are buried at the Lindsey Cemetery in Lindsey, Ohio.
