= Ted Odenwald =

American baseball player (1902–1965)

- Pitcher
- Born: January 4, 1902; Hudson, Wisconsin
- Died: October 23, 1965 (aged 63); Shakopee, Minnesota
- Batted: Right Threw: Left

MLB debut
- April 13, 1921, for the Cleveland Indians

Last MLB appearance
- April 21, 1922, for the Cleveland Indians

MLB statistics
- Win–loss record: 1-0
- Earned run average: 4.34
- Strikeouts: 6
- Stats at Baseball Reference

Teams
- Cleveland Indians (1921–1922)

Theodore Joseph Odenwald (January 4, 1902 – October 23, 1965) was a Major League Baseball pitcher who played for two seasons. He played for the Cleveland Indians for ten games during the 1921 Cleveland Indians season and one game during the 1922 Cleveland Indians season.
