= Harry Eells =

American baseball player (1881-1940)

- Pitcher
- Born: February 14, 1880; Danbury, Iowa, U.S.
- Died: December 7, 1940 (aged 60); Los Angeles, California, U.S.
- Batted: Right Threw: Right

MLB debut
- April 22, 1906, for the Cleveland Naps

Last MLB appearance
- August 14, 1906, for the Cleveland Naps

MLB statistics
- Win–loss record: 4–5
- Strikeouts: 35
- Earned run average: 2.61
- Stats at Baseball Reference

Teams
- Cleveland Naps (1906)

Harry Archibald 'Slippery' Eells (February 14, 1881 – December 7, 1940) was an American Major League Baseball pitcher who played for one season for the Cleveland Naps. He pitched in 14 games for the Naps during the 1906 season. He died in Los Angeles in 1940. He was interred at Holy Cross Cemetery in Culver City, California.
