= John Middleton (baseball) =

American baseball player (1900–1986)

- Pitcher
- Born: April 11, 1900; Mount Calm, Texas, U.S.
- Died: November 3, 1986 (aged 86); Amarillo, Texas, U.S.
- Batted: Left Threw: Left

MLB debut
- September 6, 1922, for the Cleveland Indians

Last MLB appearance
- September 21, 1922, for the Cleveland Indians

MLB statistics
- Win–loss record: 0–1
- Earned run average: 7.36
- Strikeouts: 2
- Stats at Baseball Reference

Teams
- Cleveland Indians (1922)

John Wayne Middleton (April 11, 1900 – November 3, 1986) was an American Major League Baseball pitcher who played for one season. He pitched for the Cleveland Indians for two games during the 1922 Cleveland Indians season. Middleton was one of a group of players that Indians player-manager Tris Speaker sent in partway through the game on September 21, 1922 done as an opportunity for fans to see various minor league prospects.
