= Pat McNulty =

American baseball player (1899–1963)

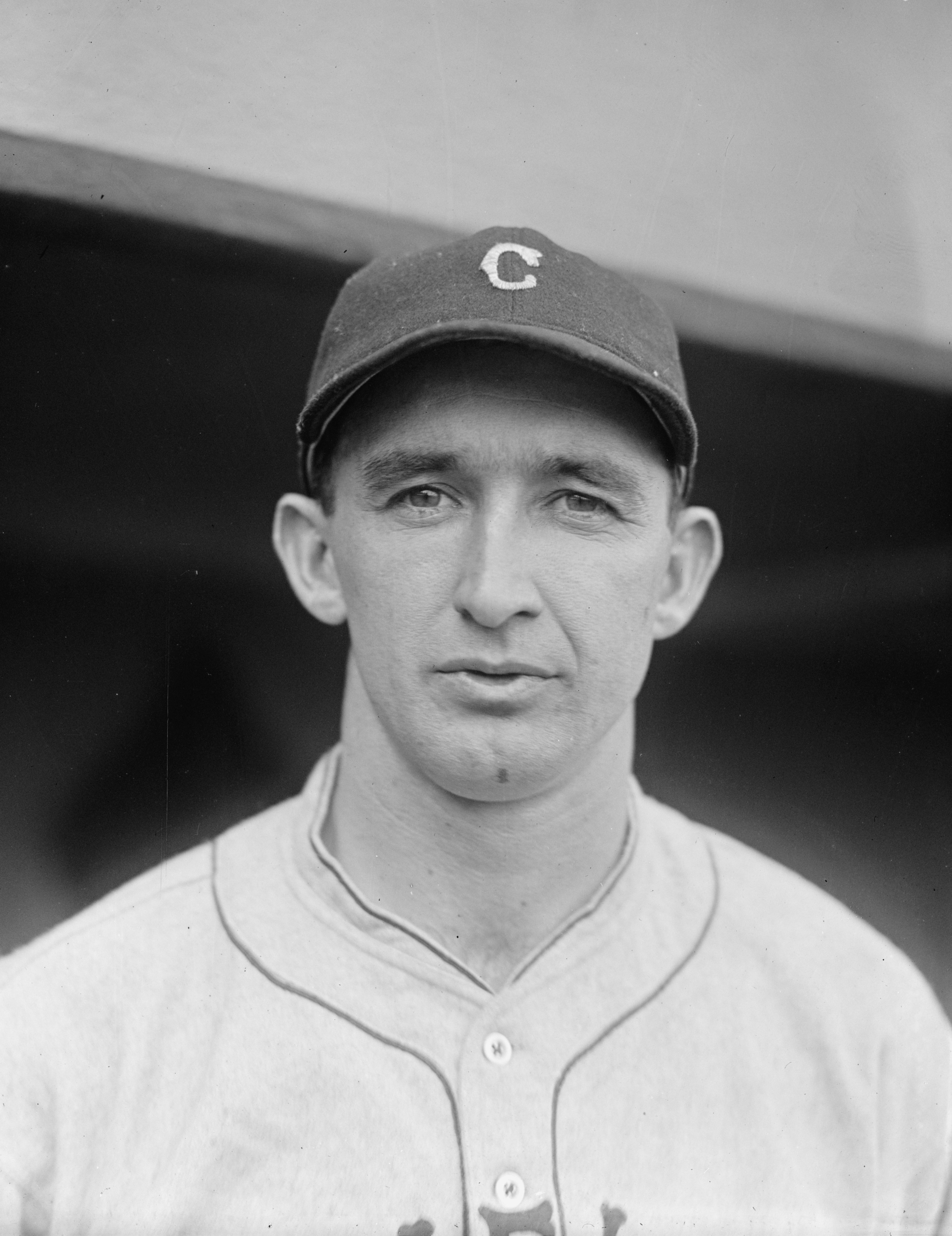
- Outfielder
- Born: February 27, 1899; Cleveland, Ohio, U.S.
- Died: May 4, 1963 (aged 64); Hollywood, California, U.S.
- Batted: Left Threw: Right

MLB debut
- September 5, 1922, for the Cleveland Indians

Last MLB appearance
- May 30, 1927, for the Cleveland Indians

MLB statistics
- Batting average: .290
- Hits: 238
- Runs batted in: 84
- Stats at Baseball Reference

Teams
- Cleveland Indians (1922, 1924–1927)

Patrick Howard McNulty (February 27, 1899 – May 4, 1963) was an American Major League Baseball (MLB) outfielder who played for five seasons. He played for the Cleveland Indians in 1922 and from 1924 to 1927, playing as the starting right fielder in 1925.

His best major league season was in 1925 when he hit all his career home runs (6), had 43 RBI and hit .314 (117-for-373) with the Cleveland Indians.

In 308 games over five seasons, McNulty posted a .290 batting average (238-for-820) with 132 runs, 6 home runs, 84 RBI, 22 stolen bases and 98 bases on balls. He finished his career with a .957 fielding percentage playing at all three outfield positions.
