= Bill Doran (third baseman) =

American baseball player (1898–1978)

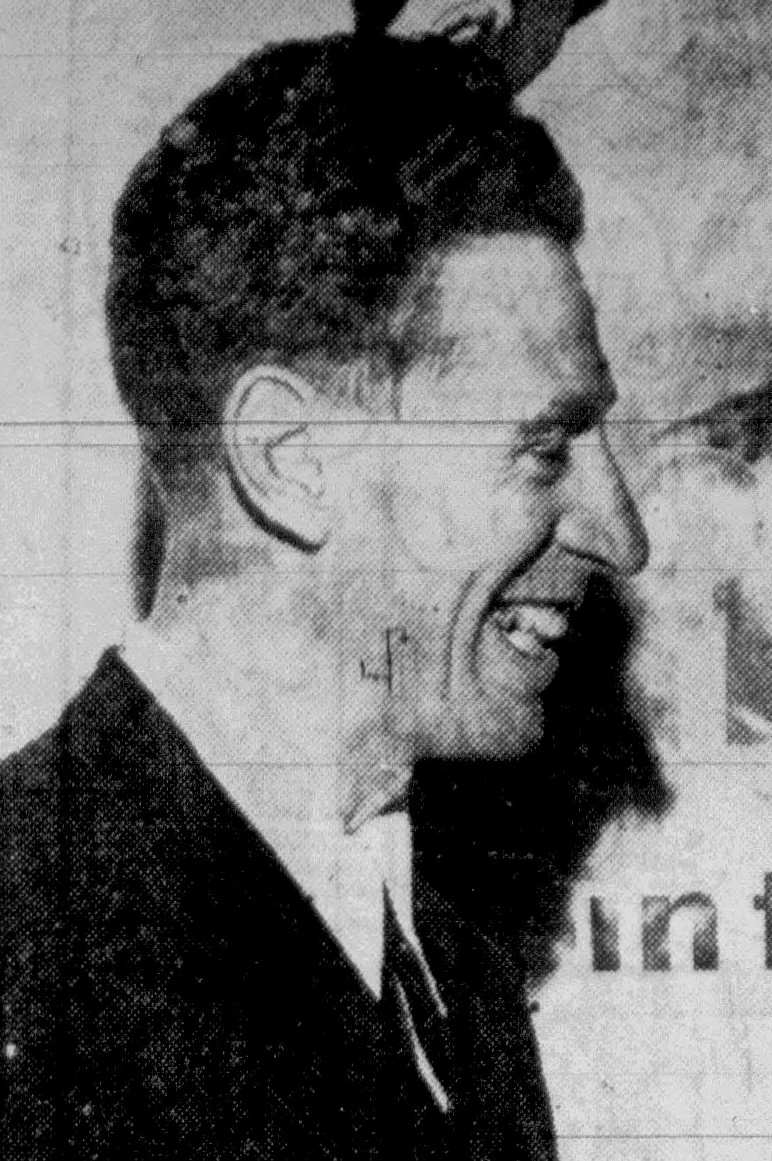
- Doran c. 1942
- Right fielder
- Born: June 14, 1898; San Francisco, California, U.S.
- Died: March 9, 1978 (aged 79); Santa Monica, California, U.S.
- Batted: Left Threw: Right

MLB debut
- June 23, 1922, for the Cleveland Indians

Last MLB appearance
- July 28, 1922, for the Cleveland Indians

MLB statistics
- Games played: 3
- At bats: 2
- Hits: 1
- Stats at Baseball Reference

Teams
- Cleveland Indians (1922)

William James Doran (June 14, 1898 – March 9, 1978) was an American Major League Baseball third baseman who played for the Cleveland Indians. An alumnus of Saint Mary's College of California, he played three games for the Indians during the 1922 Cleveland Indians season.
