= Bud Messenger =

American baseball player (1898–1971)

- Pitcher
- Born: February 1, 1898; Grand Blanc, Michigan
- Died: November 4, 1971 (aged 73); Lansing, Michigan
- Batted: Right Threw: Right

MLB debut
- July 31, 1924, for the Cleveland Indians

Last MLB appearance
- August 28, 1924, for the Cleveland Indians

MLB statistics
- Win–loss record: 2–0
- Earned run average: 4.32
- Strikeouts: 4
- Stats at Baseball Reference

Teams
- Cleveland Indians (1924)

Andrew Warren "Bud" Messenger (February 1, 1898 – November 4, 1971) was an American professional baseball pitcher. He played in Major League Baseball (MLB) for the Cleveland Indians during the 1924 season.

== Early life ==
Messenger was born in Grand Blanc, Michigan, a small community in Genesee County located approximately 8 miles (13 km) south of Flint.

== Professional career ==
=== Minor leagues ===
Before reaching the major leagues, Messenger played minor league baseball for the Saginaw Aces of the Class B Michigan–Ontario League.

=== Cleveland Indians ===
Messenger made his major league debut on July 31, 1924, at age 26, pitching for the Cleveland Indians against the Philadelphia Athletics at Dunn Field. In his debut, he pitched six innings, allowing four hits and no earned runs while striking out two batters and walking one, earning the victory in a 4–3 Cleveland win. The Indians were managed that season by player-manager Tris Speaker, the Hall of Fame center fielder.

Messenger appeared in five games for Cleveland during the 1924 season, including two starts, and compiled a 2–0 record with a 4.32 earned run average (ERA). He pitched 1/25 innings, allowing 28 hits and 14 walks while striking out four batters. His final major league appearance came on August 28, 1924, against the Chicago White Sox, when he pitched one scoreless inning in relief.

The 1924 Indians finished sixth in the American League with a 67–86 record. Messenger did not appear in the major leagues after that season.

== Personal life and death ==
Messenger stood 6 feet 0 inches (1.83 m) tall and weighed 175 pounds (79 kg). He died on November 4, 1971, in Lansing, Michigan, at the age of 73. He was buried at Roselawn Cemetery in Perry, Shiawassee County.
