= Ben Caffyn =

American baseball player (1879-1942)

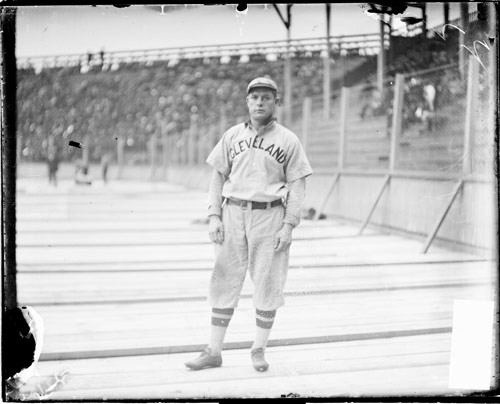
- Outfielder
- Born: February 10, 1879; Peoria, Illinois, U.S.
- Died: November 2, 1942 (aged 63); Peoria, Illinois, U.S.
- Batted: Left Threw: Left

MLB debut
- August 21, 1906, for the Cleveland Naps

Last MLB appearance
- October 7, 1906, for the Cleveland Naps

MLB statistics
- Batting average: .194
- Home runs: 0
- Runs batted in: 3
- Stats at Baseball Reference

Teams
- Cleveland Naps (1906)

Benjamin Thomas Caffyn (February 10, 1879 – November 22, 1942) was an American Major League Baseball outfielder who played for one season. He played for the Cleveland Naps from August 21, 1906, to October 7, 1906.
