= Chick Sorrells =

American baseball player (1896–1983)

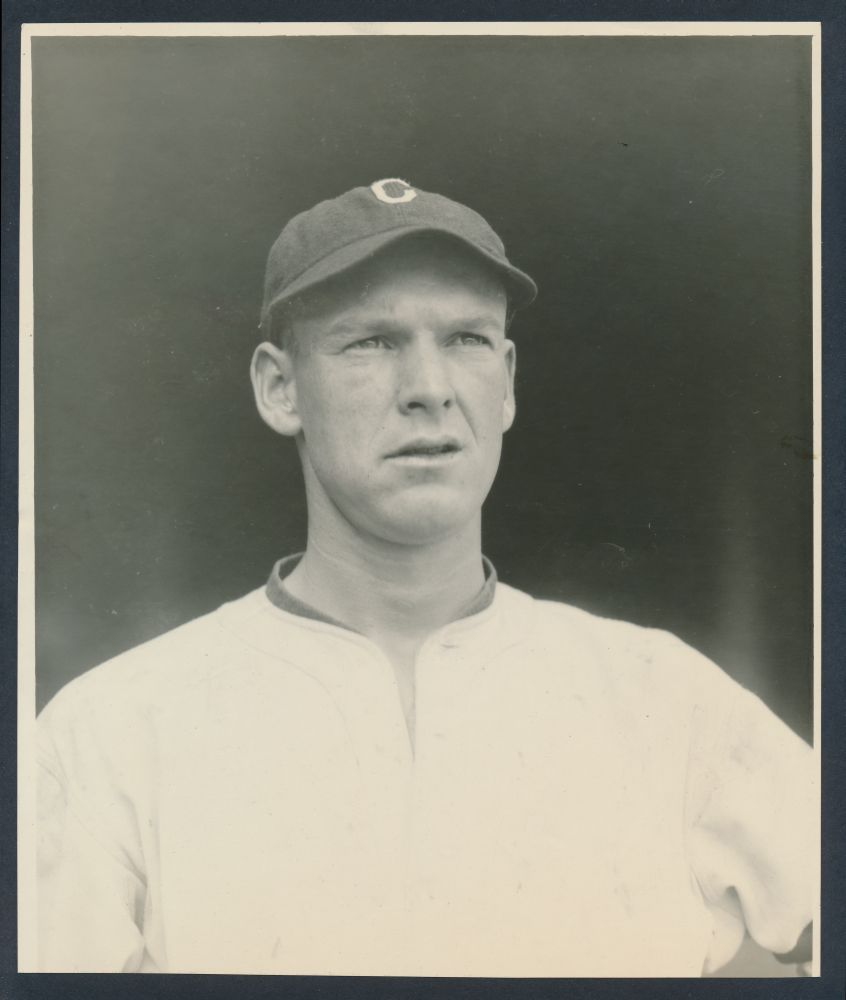
- Shortstop
- Born: July 31, 1896; Stringtown, Oklahoma
- Died: July 20, 1983 (aged 86); Terrell, Texas
- Batted: Right Threw: Right

MLB debut
- September 18, 1922, for the Cleveland Indians

Last MLB appearance
- September 21, 1922, for the Cleveland Indians

MLB statistics
- Games played: 2
- At bats: 1
- Hits: 0
- Stats at Baseball Reference

Teams
- Cleveland Indians (1922)

Raymond Edwin "Chick" Sorrells (July 31, 1896 – July 20, 1983) was a Major League Baseball shortstop who played for one season. He played for the Cleveland Indians for two games during the 1922 Cleveland Indians season.

Sorrells was one of a group of players that Indians player-manager Tris Speaker sent in partway through the game on September 21, 1922, done as an opportunity for fans to see various minor league prospects.
