= Jim Lindsey (baseball) =

American baseball player (1899–1963)

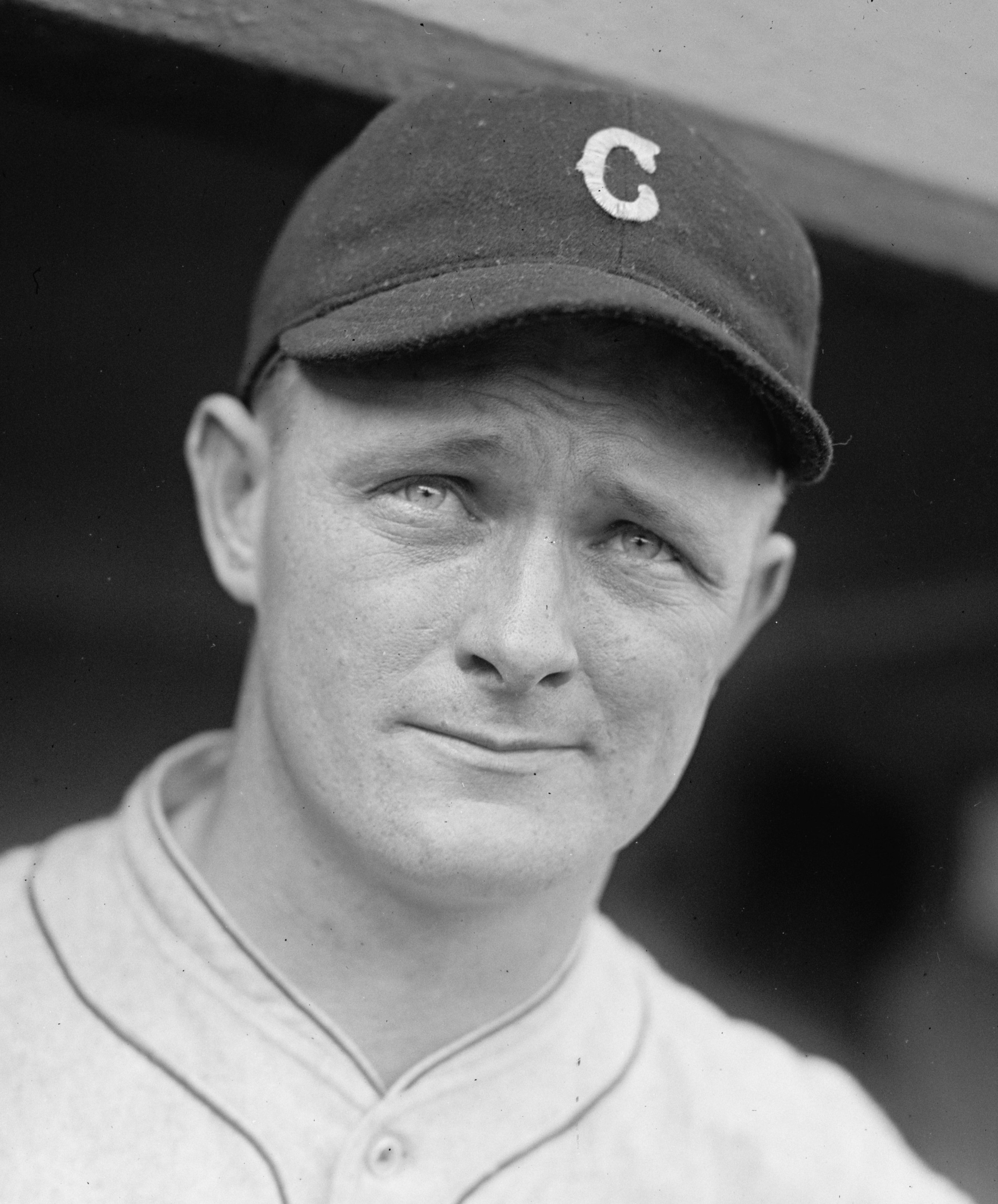
- Lindsey in 1924
- Pitcher
- Born: January 24, 1899; Greensburg, Louisiana, U.S.
- Died: October 25, 1963 (aged 64); Jackson, Louisiana, U.S.
- Batted: Right Threw: Right

MLB debut
- May 1, 1922, for the Cleveland Indians

Last MLB appearance
- September 27, 1937, for the Brooklyn Dodgers

MLB statistics
- Win–loss record: 21–20
- Earned run average: 4.70
- Strikeouts: 175
- Stats at Baseball Reference

Teams
- Cleveland Indians (1922, 1924); St. Louis Cardinals (1929–1933); Cincinnati Reds (1934); St. Louis Cardinals (1934); Brooklyn Dodgers (1937)

Career highlights and awards
- World Series champion (1931)

James Kendrick Lindsey (January 24, 1899 – October 25, 1963) was an American Major League Baseball pitcher from 1922 to 1937. He helped the Cardinals win the 1930 National League pennant and win the 1931 World Series.

In 9 seasons Lindsey had a 21–20 win–loss record, 177 games, 20 games started, 5 complete games, 1 shutout, 80 games finished, 19 saves, 431 innings pitched, 507 hits, 261 runs, 225 earned runs, 25 home runs allowed, 176 walks allowed, 175 strikeouts, 12 hit batsmen, 9 wild pitches, 1,943 batters faced, 3 balks and a 4.70 ERA.

In 1938, Lindsey was one of three managers of the Dayton Ducks of the Middle Atlantic League.

Born in Greensburg, Louisiana, Lindsey died in Jackson, Louisiana, at the age of 64.
