= Joe Rabbitt =

American baseball player (1900–1969)

- Outfielder
- Born: January 16, 1900; Frontenac, Kansas, U.S.
- Died: December 5, 1969 (aged 69); Norwalk, Connecticut, U.S.
- Batted: Left Threw: Right

MLB debut
- September 15, 1922, for the Cleveland Indians

Last MLB appearance
- September 21, 1922, for the Cleveland Indians

MLB statistics
- Games played: 2
- At bats: 3
- Hits: 1
- Stats at Baseball Reference

Teams
- Cleveland Indians (1922)

Joseph Patrick Rabbitt (January 16, 1900 – December 5, 1969) was an American Major League Baseball left fielder who played for one season. He played in two games for the Cleveland Indians during the 1922 Cleveland Indians season. Rabbitt was one of a group of players that Indians player-manager Tris Speaker sent in partway through the game on September 21, 1922, which was done as an opportunity for fans to see various minor league prospects.
