= Ginger Shinault =

American baseball player (1892–1930)

- Catcher
- Born: September 7, 1892; Benton, Arkansas
- Died: December 29, 1930 (aged 38); Denver, Colorado
- Batted: Right Threw: Right

MLB debut
- July 4, 1921, for the Cleveland Indians

Last MLB appearance
- August 1, 1922, for the Cleveland Indians

MLB statistics
- Batting average: .295
- Home runs: 0
- Runs batted in: 4
- Stats at Baseball Reference

Teams
- Cleveland Indians (1921–1922)

Enoch Erskine "Ginger" Shinault (September 7, 1892 – December 29, 1930) was a Major League Baseball catcher who played for two seasons. He played for the Cleveland Indians from 1921 to 1922, playing in 35 career games.
