= Hap Collard =

American baseball player (1898–1968)

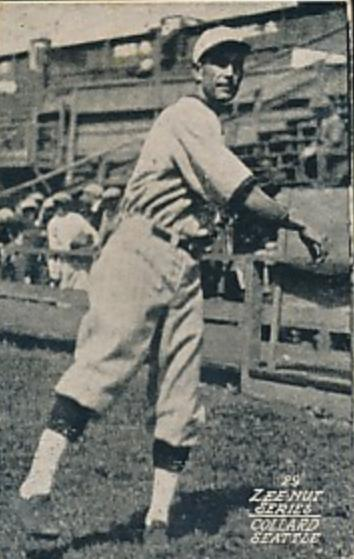
- Pitcher
- Born: August 29, 1898; Williams, Arizona
- Died: July 9, 1968 (aged 69); Jamestown, California
- Batted: Right Threw: Right

MLB debut
- April 23, 1927, for the Cleveland Indians

Last MLB appearance
- September 22, 1930, for the Philadelphia Phillies

MLB statistics
- Win–loss record: 6–12
- Earned run average: 6.60
- Strikeouts: 28
- Stats at Baseball Reference

Teams
- Cleveland Indians (1927–1928); Philadelphia Phillies (1930)

Earl Clinton "Hap" Collard (August 29, 1898 – July 9, 1968) was a Major League Baseball pitcher who played for three seasons. He played for the Cleveland Indians from 1927 to 1928 and the Philadelphia Phillies in 1930.
