= Dave Keefe =

American baseball player (1897–1978)

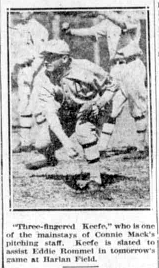
- Pitcher
- Born: January 9, 1897; Williston, Vermont, U.S.
- Died: February 4, 1978 (aged 81); Kansas City, Missouri, U.S.
- Batted: Left Threw: Right

MLB debut
- April 21, 1917, for the Philadelphia Athletics

Last MLB appearance
- August 5, 1922, for the Cleveland Indians

MLB statistics
- Win–loss record: 9–17
- Earned run average: 4.15
- Strikeouts: 126
- Stats at Baseball Reference

Teams
- Philadelphia Athletics (1917, 1919–1921); Cleveland Indians (1922)

David Edwin Keefe (January 9, 1897 – February 4, 1978) was an American professional baseball pitcher, coach and front-office official. He played in Major League Baseball (MLB) for the Philadelphia Athletics in 1917 and from 1919 to 1921, and the Cleveland Indians in 1922. Born in Williston, Vermont, he batted left-handed, threw right-handed and was listed as 5 feet 9 inches (1.75 m) tall and 165 pounds (75 kg).

Keefe's playing career lasted from 1917 through 1932, missing the 1918 campaign while serving in the United States Navy during World War I. In 97 MLB games pitched, 27 as a starting pitcher, he won nine games, lost 17, and posted 12 complete games, one shutout, two saves (not then an official statistic), and an earned run average of 4.15. He permitted 403 hits and 113 bases on balls, with 126 strikeouts, in 3532/3 innings pitched.

Keefe returned to the Major Leagues as a batting practice pitcher for the Athletics in the early 1930s and was listed as a full-time coach under Baseball Hall of Fame manager Connie Mack for eight seasons (1941; 1943; 1945–1950). He then served as the club's traveling secretary (1951–1960) in both Philadelphia and Kansas City, where the Athletics moved in 1955. He died, at age 81, in Kansas City after a fire struck his apartment building and he was overcome when trying to rescue another elderly resident.
