= Jack Hammond =

American baseball player (1891–1942)

- Second baseman
- Born: February 26, 1891; Amsterdam, New York, U.S.
- Died: March 4, 1942 (aged 51); Kenosha, Wisconsin, U.S.
- Batted: Right Threw: Right

MLB debut
- April 15, 1915, for the Cleveland Indians

Last MLB appearance
- June 16, 1922, for the Pittsburgh Pirates

MLB statistics
- Batting average: .222
- Home runs: 0
- Runs scored: 13
- Stats at Baseball Reference

Teams
- Cleveland Indians (1915,1922); Pittsburgh Pirates (1922)

Walter Charles "Jack" Hammond (February 26, 1891 – March 4, 1942), nicknamed "Wobby", was an American second baseman in Major League Baseball who played for the Cleveland Indians and Pittsburgh Pirates. He batted and threw right-handed, had a height of 5'11" and a weight of 170 lbs. He went to Colgate University.

Born in Amsterdam, New York, Hammond played his first game on April 15, 1915 and his final game on June 16, 1922. He died at age 51 in Kenosha, Wisconsin.
