= George Edmondson (baseball) =

American baseball player (1896–1973)

George Edmonson
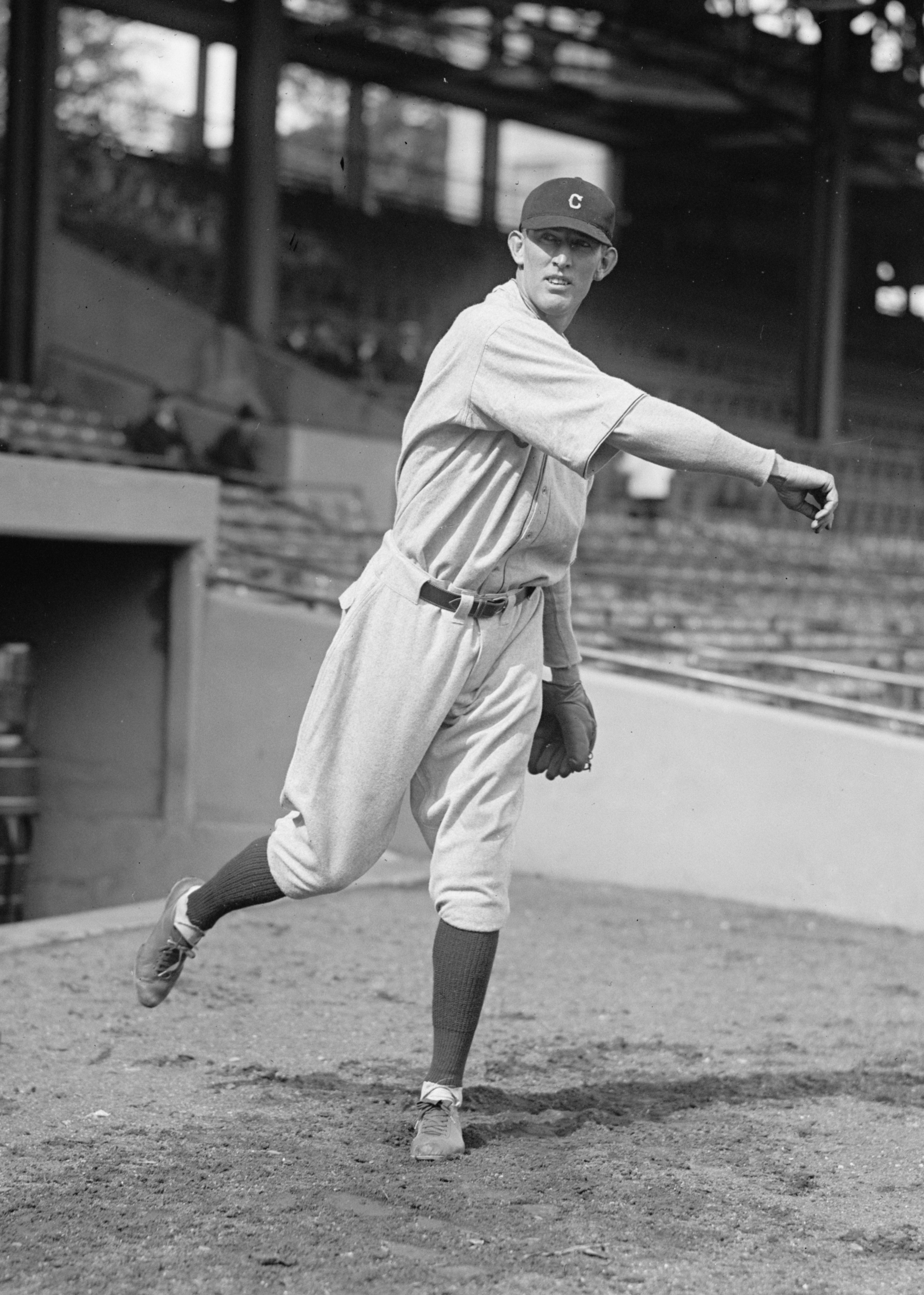
- Pitcher
- Born: May 18, 1896; Waxahachie, Texas, U.S.
- Died: July 11, 1973 (aged 77); Waco, Texas, U.S.
- Batted: Right Threw: Right

MLB debut
- August 15, 1922, for the Cleveland Indians

Last MLB appearance
- June 6, 1924, for the Cleveland Indians

MLB statistics
- Win–loss record: 0–0
- Earned run average: 9.64
- Strikeouts: 3
- Stats at Baseball Reference

Teams
- Cleveland Indians (1922–1924)

George Henderson Edmondson (May 18, 1896 – July 11, 1973) was an American professional baseball pitcher who appeared in eight games over parts of three Major League Baseball seasons (1922–1924) for the Cleveland Indians. The right-hander, nicknamed "Big Ed", was listed as 6 feet 1 inch (1.85 m) tall and 179 pounds (81 kg). He was born in Waxahachie, Texas.

Edmonson's three partial seasons with Cleveland included significant minor league service. In his eight games with the Indians, he made one start, on May 26, 1924; he did not earn a decision after allowing three hits, three bases on balls, and four earned runs in 32/3 innings to the Boston Red Sox at Fenway Park. The Indians lost the contest, 10–9.

During his three brief trials with Cleveland, he posted a 0–0 won–lost record. In 14 innings pitched, he allowed 22 hits, eight bases on balls and 15 earned runs, for a career earned run average of 9.64.

Edmondson won 84 games in the minor leagues, including 20 for the 1927 Peoria Tractors of the Class B Three-I League. He retired in 1930.
