= Ike Kahdot =

American baseball player (1899–1999)

- Third baseman
- Born: October 22, 1899; Georgetown, Indian Territory
- Died: March 31, 1999 (aged 99); Oklahoma City, Oklahoma, U.S.
- Batted: Right Threw: Right

MLB debut
- September 5, 1922, for the Cleveland Indians

Last MLB appearance
- September 21, 1922, for the Cleveland Indians

MLB statistics
- Games played: 4
- At bats: 2
- Hits: 0
- Stats at Baseball Reference

Teams
- Cleveland Indians (1922)

Isaac Leonard Kahdot (October 22, 1899 – March 31, 1999) was a Major League Baseball (MLB) third baseman. Nicknamed "Chief", he played for the Cleveland Indians in 1922.

Kahdot was an enrolled citizen of the Citizen Potawatomi Nation who grew up in a mostly Indigenous village in Oklahoma and attended Haskell Institute.

Kahdot was one of a group of players whom Indians player-manager Tris Speaker sent in during the game on September 21, 1922, which was done as an opportunity for fans to see various minor league prospects.

After the 1923 season, the Indians asked him to play for a minor league team in Grand Rapids in the Michigan-Ontario League but he declined, having moved to Coffeyville, Kansas, with his family. Kahdot continued playing minor league baseball until 1941 and worked as a derrickman in oilfields until 1958 at which point he took a job at Tinker Air Force Base for 11 years until retirement. At the time of his death, he was the oldest living former major league player.

Records
Preceded by Red Hoff	Oldest recognized verified living baseball player September 17, 1998 – March 31, 1999	Succeeded by Karl Swanson
