= George Winn =

American baseball player (1897–1969)

- Pitcher
- Born: October 26, 1897; Perry, Georgia, U.S.
- Died: November 1, 1969 (aged 72); Roberta, Georgia, U.S.
- Batted: Left Threw: Left

MLB debut
- April 29, 1919, for the Boston Red Sox

Last MLB appearance
- April 28, 1923, for the Cleveland Indians

MLB statistics
- Win–loss record: 1–2
- Strikeouts: 7
- Earned run average: 4.69
- Stats at Baseball Reference

Teams
- Boston Red Sox (1919); Cleveland Indians (1922–23)

George Benjamin Winn (October 26, 1897 – November 1, 1969) was an American professional baseball pitcher. He played parts of three seasons in Major League Baseball between 1919 and 1923 for the Boston Red Sox (1919) and Cleveland Indians (1922–23). Listed at 5 ft 11 in (1.80 m), 170 lb., Winn batted and threw left-handed. A native of Perry, Georgia, he attended Mercer University.

In a three-season career, Winn, who was nicknamed "Breezy" and "Lefty", posted a 1–2 record with a 4.69 ERA in 12 appearances, including three starts, one complete game, 50 hits allowed, seven strikeouts, seven walks, and 40.1 innings pitched.

Winn died at the age of 72 in Roberta, Georgia.
