= Dutch Levsen =

American baseball player (1898–1972)

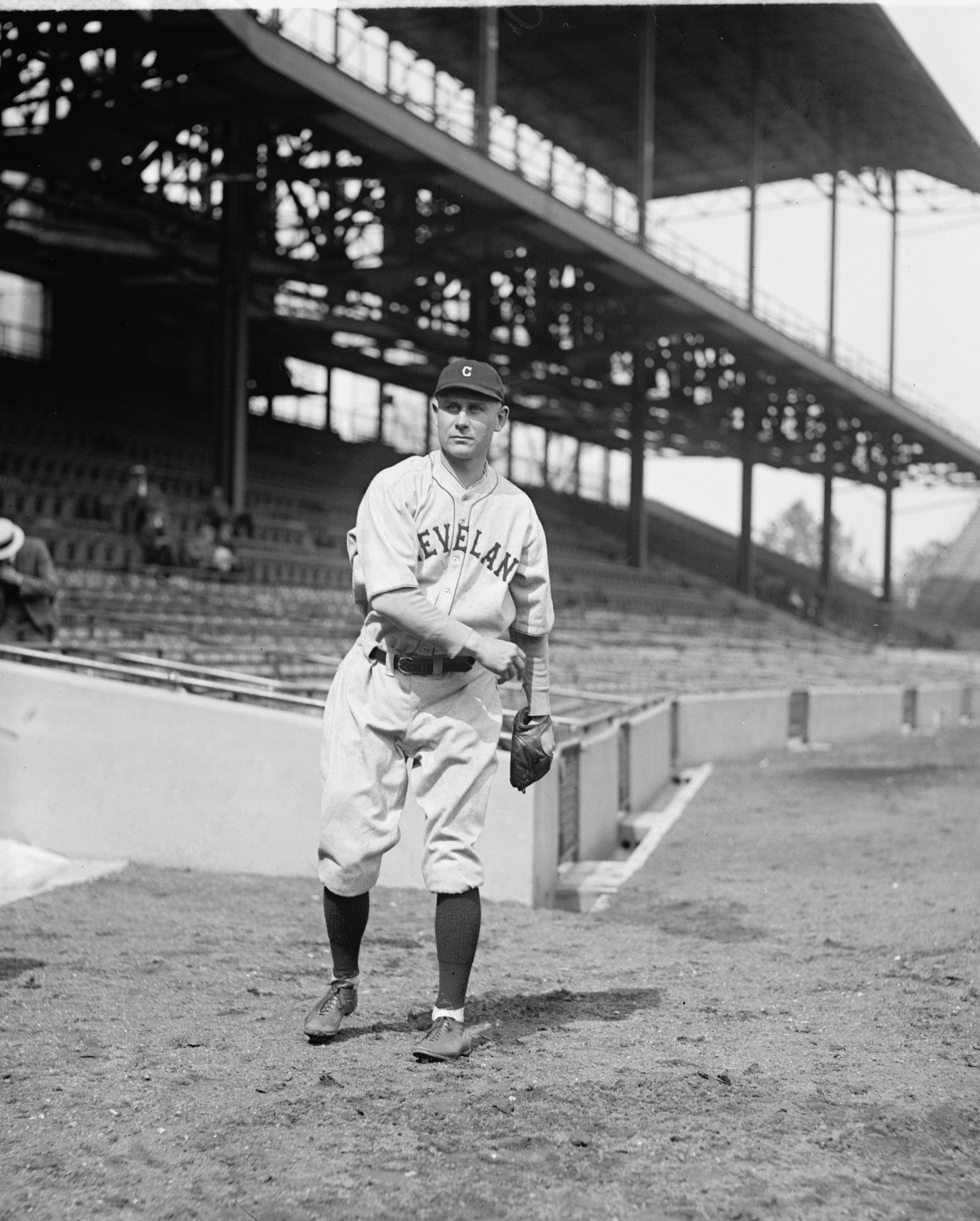
- Levson in 1924
- Pitcher
- Born: April 29, 1898; Wyoming, Iowa, U.S.
- Died: March 12, 1972 (aged 73); St. Louis Park, Minnesota, U.S.
- Batted: Right Threw: Right

MLB debut
- September 28, 1923, for the Cleveland Indians

Last MLB appearance
- July 31, 1928, for the Cleveland Indians

MLB statistics
- Win–loss record: 21–26
- Earned run average: 4.17
- Strikeouts: 88
- Stats at Baseball Reference

Teams
- Cleveland Indians (1923–1928)

Emil Henry "Dutch" Levsen (April 29, 1898 – March 12, 1972) was an American Major League Baseball pitcher who played for six seasons. He spent his entire career with the Cleveland Indians, pitching for them from 1923 to 1928. Often plagued with arm trouble, his finest season was in 1926, going 16-13 with a 3.41 ERA, with 18 complete games and 2 shutouts. He would pitch in 80 career games, finishing with a 21–26 record.

On August 28, 1926 Levsen became the last pitcher to start and win both games of a doubleheader, hurling two 9 inning games back to back, winning 6-1 and 5-1, also making him the last pitcher to throw two nine-inning complete games on the same day.
