= Lou Guisto =

American baseball player (1895–1989)

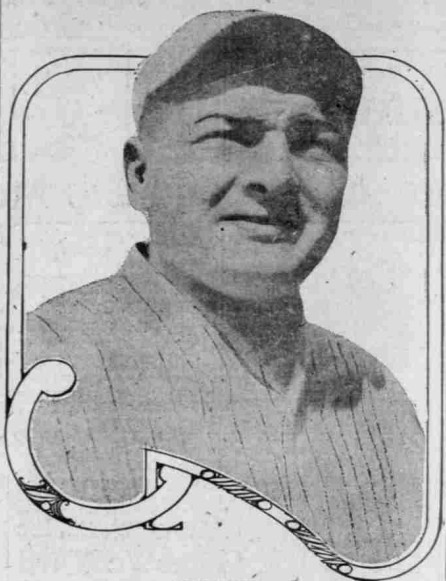
- First baseman
- Born: January 16, 1895; Napa, California, U.S.
- Died: October 15, 1989 (aged 94); Napa, California, U.S.
- Batted: Right Threw: Right

MLB debut
- September 10, 1916, for the Cleveland Indians

Last MLB appearance
- June 25, 1923, for the Cleveland Indians

MLB statistics
- Batting average: .196
- Hits: 88
- Runs: 35
- Stats at Baseball Reference

Teams
- Cleveland Indians (1916–1917, 1921–1923)

Louis Joseph Guisto (January 16, 1895 – October 15, 1989) was an American Major League Baseball first baseman who played for five seasons. He played for the Cleveland Indians from 1916 to 1917 and from 1921 to 1923.

He managed in the minors from 1929–1931.

The baseball field at Saint Mary's College of California, where Guisto played, is named Louis Guisto Field.
