= Uke Clanton =

American baseball player (1898–1960)

- First baseman
- Born: February 19, 1898; Powell, Missouri, U.S.
- Died: February 24, 1960 (aged 62); Antlers, Oklahoma, U.S.
- Batted: Left Threw: Left

MLB debut
- September 21, 1922, for the Cleveland Indians

Last MLB appearance
- September 21, 1922, for the Cleveland Indians

MLB statistics
- Games played: 1
- At bats: 1
- Hits: 0
- Stats at Baseball Reference

Teams
- Cleveland Indians (1922)

Eucal "Uke" Clanton (February 19, 1898 – February 24, 1960) was an American Major League Baseball (MLB) first baseman who played for one season. Nicknamed "Cat", he played for the Cleveland Indians for one game on September 21, 1922. Clanton was one of a group of players that Indians player-manager Tris Speaker sent in partway through the game on September 21, 1922 done as an opportunity for fans to see various minor league prospects.

Clanton played collegiate baseball for the Oklahoma Sooners. Clanton died in an automobile accident in Antlers, Oklahoma.
