= Logan Drake =

American baseball player (1899–1940)

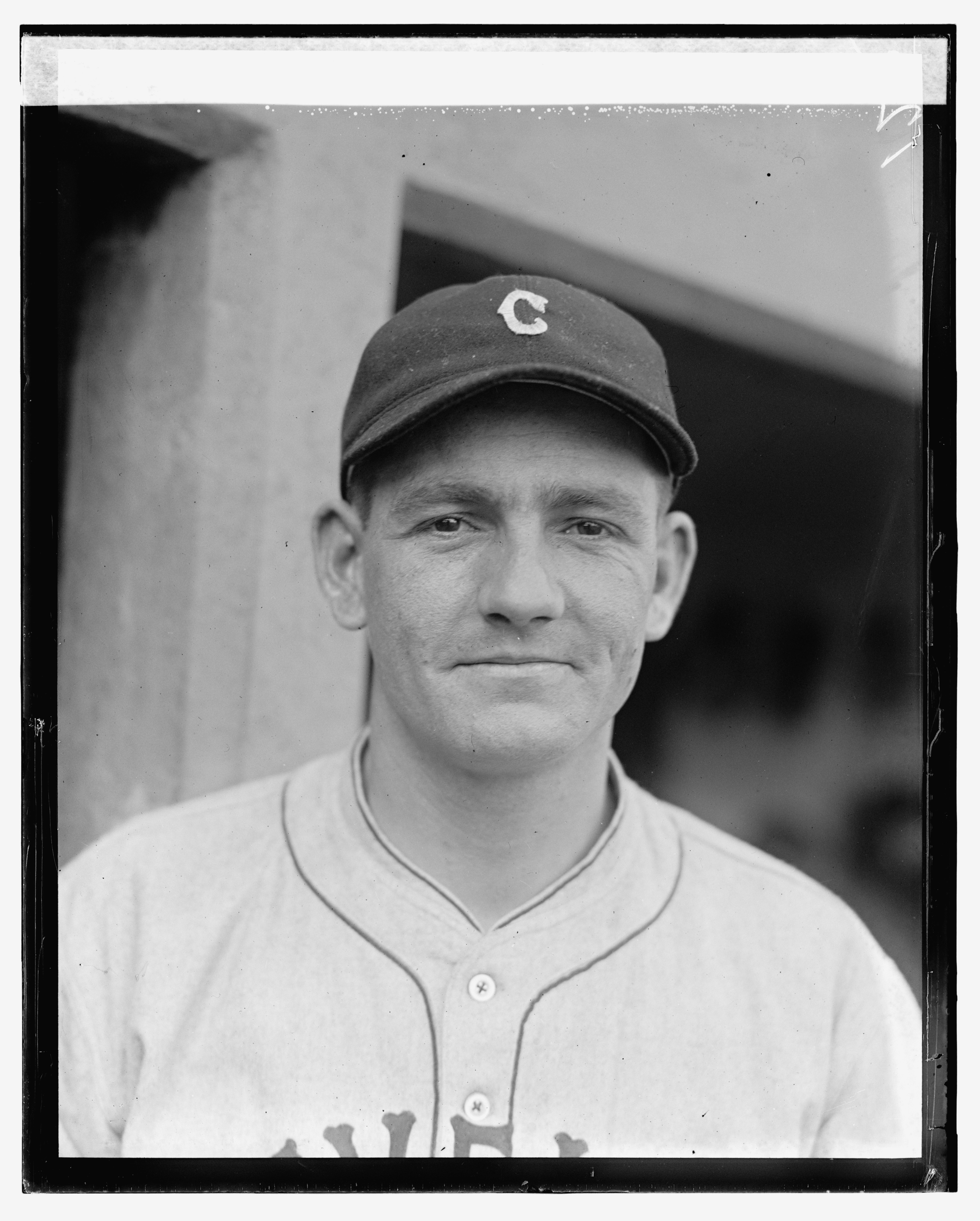
- Drake in 1924
- Pitcher
- Born: December 26, 1899; Spartanburg, South Carolina, U.S.
- Died: June 1, 1940 (aged 40); Columbia, South Carolina, U.S.
- Batted: Right Threw: Right

MLB debut
- September 21, 1922, for the Cleveland Indians

Last MLB appearance
- June 6, 1924, for the Cleveland Indians

MLB statistics
- Win/Loss Record: 0–1
- Strikeouts: 11
- Earned run average: 7.71
- Stats at Baseball Reference

Teams
- Cleveland Indians (1922–1924).

Logan Gaffney Drake (December 26, 1899 – June 1, 1940) was an American professional baseball pitcher, a right-hander who played in Major League Baseball (MLB) from 1922 to 1924 for the Cleveland Indians. In 10 career games, Drake pitched 18 2/3 innings and posted a win–loss record of 0–1 with a 7.71 earned run average (ERA).

Born in Spartanburg, South Carolina, Drake began his professional career in 1919. He spent the next four seasons in the minor leagues, and was signed by the Cleveland Indians in late 1922. He played for the Indians at the end of the 1922 and 1923 seasons as well as the 1924 season until his release. He spent the rest of 1924 with the Wichita Falls Spudders until an injury caused him to lose his index finger. Despite the injury, he continued to play professional baseball until 1928. He then retired to South Carolina, operating a sandwich business until his death in 1940.

== Early life and career ==
Logan Drake was born on December 26, 1899 in Spartanburg, South Carolina to James and Mildred, and grew up in Spartanburg and Columbia, South Carolina. Drake began his professional baseball career with the Bradenton Growers of the Florida State League. He spent the 1919 and 1920 seasons with them, and finished 1920 with a 20–13 record and a 2.17 ERA. The following season, he played for the Jacksonville Scouts of the Florida State League and the Birmingham Barons of the Southern Association. Before the 1922 season began, Birmingham traded him to the Chattanooga Lookouts. Drake spent the season with the Lookouts, finishing with an 11–16 record and a 3.13 ERA. At the end of the minor league season in August, his contract was purchased by the Cleveland Indians. Drake debuted as one of a group of players that Indians player-manager Tris Speaker sent in partway through the game on September 21, 1922, done as an opportunity for fans to see various minor league prospects. In the game, Drake pitched three innings and allowed one earned run in what was his only major league appearance that year.

Drake returned to the Lookouts for most of the 1923 season. He finished the season with nine wins, 20 losses, and a 4.83 ERA. Despite worse numbers in 1923, Indians management felt that he showed enough promise that they again brought him back to the major leagues in September. Drake played in four games for the Indians, and had a 4.15 ERA. Entering the 1924 season, Drake was invited to spring training, where Speaker worked with him to try to shorten his pitching motion, which they felt was the primary reason for his 20 losses the year prior. He made the major league roster to begin the year, and pitched in five games for the Indians. He made the only starting appearance of his career on May 30, and allowed seven runs in under three innings to the Detroit Tigers. After one more game and a 10.32 ERA in his five appearances, he was released from his contract and sent to the Wichita Falls Spudders of the Texas League. He pitched in 30 games for the Spudders, finishing the season with a 7–11 record and a 4.44 ERA. In the final game of the season, Drake was hit in the index finger by a batted ball. After a few days of treatment, he developed blood poisoning, requiring amputation of the finger. This left his professional baseball career in doubt, but Drake stated his intention of returning to the game the following season.

== Later life and career ==
Drake began his pitching comeback in 1925 with Wichita Falls for a game, pitching four scoreless innings for the Spudders. He was released early in the season, and joined the Knoxville Smokies of the South Atlantic League in May. After a couple months of minimal use, Macon Peaches manager Ernie Burke wanted to acquire him for the team, which led to Drake being granted his release from Knoxville and starting with Macon. He was released in August, near the end of the minor league season.

In 1926, Drake joined the Beaumont Exporters of the Texas League. He pitched in 12 games for the team, going 3–6 with a 9.00 ERA. He was released from the team in July, and joined the Albany Nuts for the rest of the season, where he played as a both a pitcher and outfielder, and had a .246 batting average in 27 games. In December 1926, he was traded to the Elmira Colonels for Al Platte with the intention of keeping him as a pitcher. He pitched in 20 games for Elmira, finishing the season with a 7–7 record and a 5.40 ERA. In 1928, Drake played for the Richmond Colts of the Virginia League. He lost six games early on, and played for the team until the Virginia League folded in June. In the 1930s, he was considered an option to become manager of the Spartanburg Spartans, but otherwise had no further experience in professional baseball.

After retirement, Drake worked with his brothers in the sandwich business. He ran the Gaffney Sandwich company in Columbia, and also ran Mrs. Drake's Sandwiches in Tennessee. He later married Iva Giles and had two daughters. Drake died on June 1, 1940 at the age of 40 in Columbia and is buried at Elmwood Cemetery.
