= Homer Summa =

American baseball player (1898–1966)

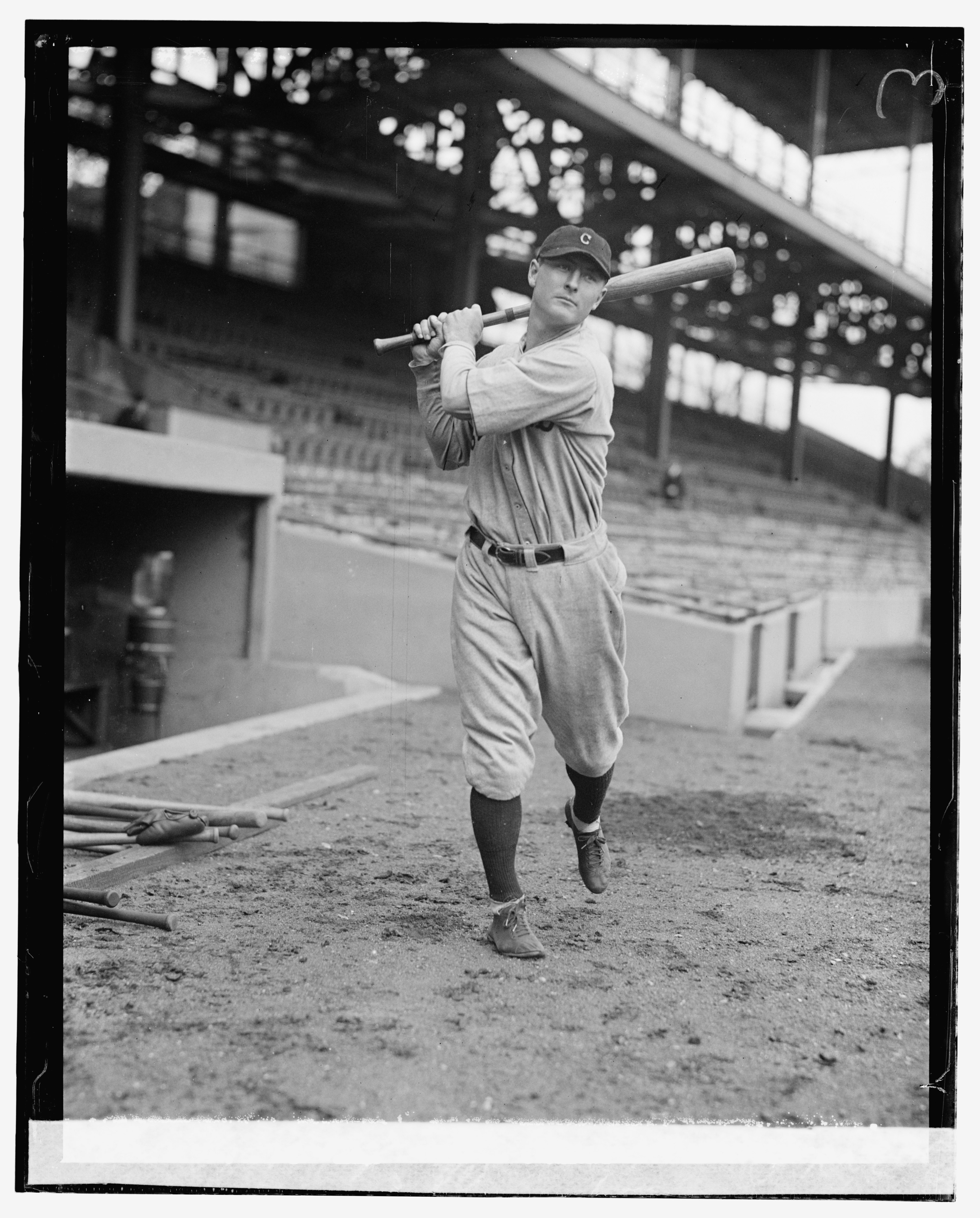
- Summa in 1924
- Right fielder
- Born: November 3, 1898; Gentry, Missouri, U.S.
- Died: January 29, 1966 (aged 67); Los Angeles, California, U.S.
- Batted: Left Threw: Right

MLB debut
- September 13, 1920, for the Pittsburgh Pirates

Last MLB appearance
- September 28, 1930, for the Philadelphia Athletics

MLB statistics
- Batting average: .302
- Home runs: 18
- Runs batted in: 363
- Stats at Baseball Reference

Teams
- Pittsburgh Pirates (1920); Cleveland Indians (1922–1928); Philadelphia Athletics (1929–1930)

Career highlights and awards
- World Series champion (1929)

Homer Wayne Summa (November 3, 1898 – January 29, 1966) was an American professional baseball right fielder. He played in Major League Baseball (MLB) from 1920 to 1930. He began his career with the Pittsburgh Pirates, but played most of his career for the Cleveland Indians before finishing as a reserve with the Philadelphia Athletics. His career batting average was .302. He is buried in Glendale, California's Grand View Memorial Park Cemetery.

On May 31, 1927, he became the first player in history to hit into a game ending unassisted triple play.

In 840 games over 10 seasons, Summa compiled a .302 batting average (905-for-3001) with 413 runs, 166 doubles, 34 triples, 18 home runs, 363 RBI, 166 base on balls,.346 on-base percentage and .398 slugging percentage. Defensively, he recorded a .960 fielding percentage.
