= Phil Bedgood =

American baseball player (1898–1927)

- Pitcher
- Born: March 8, 1898; Harrison, Georgia
- Died: May 8, 1927 (aged 29); Fort Pierce, Florida
- Batted: Right Threw: Right

MLB debut
- September 20, 1922, for the Cleveland Indians

Last MLB appearance
- September 15, 1923, for the Cleveland Indians

MLB statistics
- Win–loss record: 1–2
- Strikeouts: 12
- Earned run average: 4.88
- Stats at Baseball Reference

Teams
- Cleveland Indians (1922–1923)

Phillip Burlette Bedgood (March 8, 1898 – May 8, 1927) pitched two years of major league baseball for the Cleveland Indians, in 1922 and 1923. He played his first game on September 20, 1922, and his last game on September 15, 1923.

Bedgood pitched 27 innings in his career. Bedgood died at the early age of 29 when his appendix burst while being treated for a strained muscle in his side.
