= Dewey Metivier =

American baseball player (1898–1947)

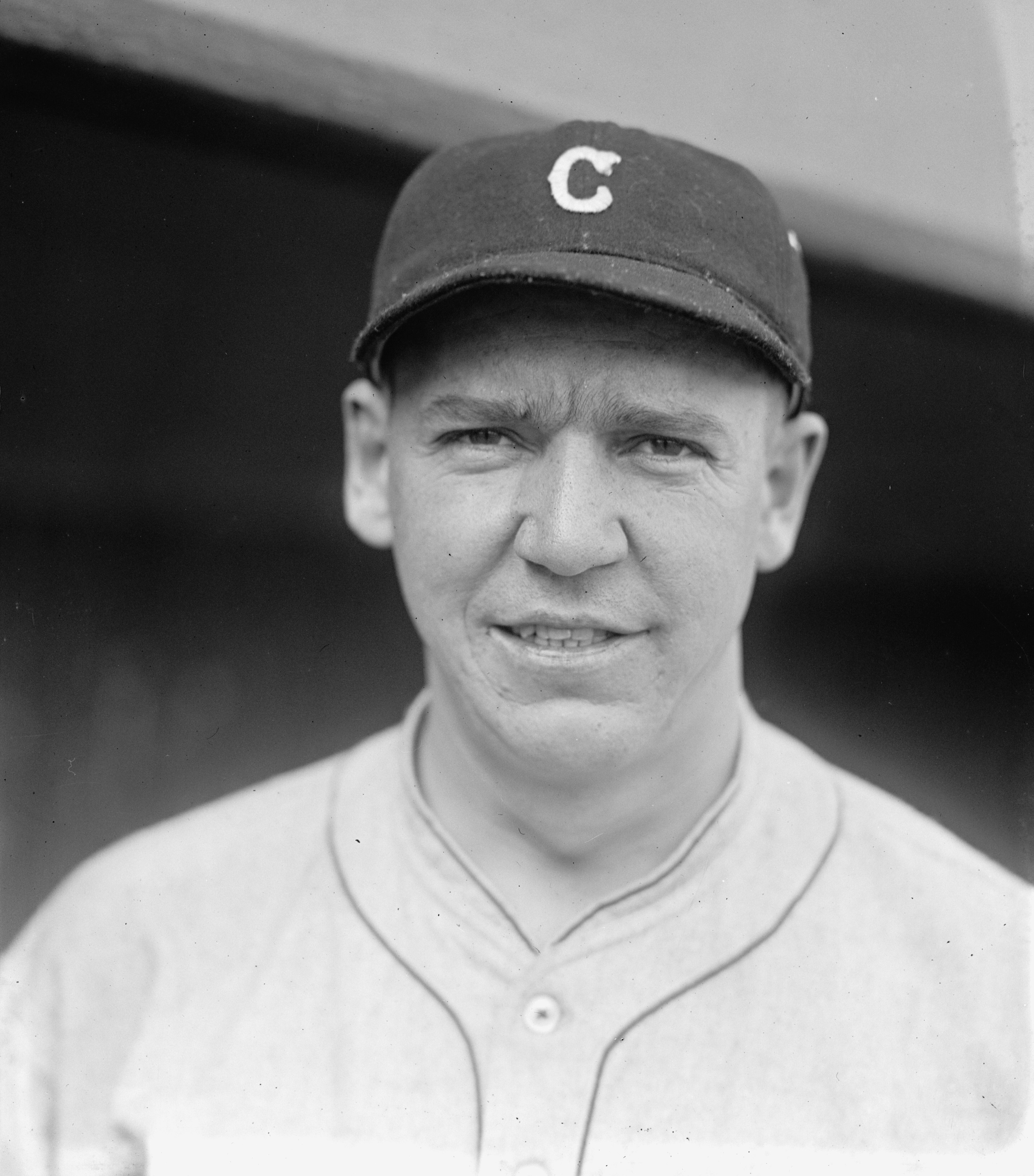
- Pitcher
- Born: May 6, 1898; Cambridge, Massachusetts, U.S.
- Died: March 2, 1947 (aged 48); Cambridge, Massachusetts, U.S.
- Batted: Left Threw: Right

MLB debut
- September 15, 1922, for the Cleveland Indians

Last MLB appearance
- September 11, 1924, for the Cleveland Indians

MLB statistics
- Win–loss record: 7–7
- Earned run average: 5.74
- Strikeouts: 24
- Stats at Baseball Reference

Teams
- Cleveland Indians (1922–1924)

George Dewey Metivier (May 6, 1898 – March 2, 1947) was an American Major League Baseball pitcher who played for three seasons. He played for the Cleveland Indians from 1922 to 1924, playing in 54 career games.
