= Chicago White Sox all-time roster =

List of baseball players

The following is a list of players and managers (*), both past and current, who appeared at least in one regular season game for the Chicago White Sox franchise.

== A ==
- David Aardsma
- Jeff Abbott
- Jim Abbott
- Shawn Abner
- Cal Abrams
- José Abreu
- Fritz Ackley
- Cy Acosta
- José Acosta
- Luisangel Acuña
- Bill Adair *
- Jerry Adair
- Bobby Adams
- Doug Adams
- Herb Adams
- Grady Adkins
- Jon Adkins
- Tommie Agee
- Juan Agosto
- Hanser Alberto
- Al Alburquerque
- Scotty Alcock
- Tyler Alexander
- Dick Allen
- Hank Allen
- Lloyd Allen
- Neil Allen
- Bill Almon
- Witto Aloma
- Roberto Alomar
- Sandy Alomar Sr.
- Sandy Alomar Jr.
- Yonder Alonso
- Dan Altavilla
- Dave Altizer
- Nick Altrock
- Luis Alvarado
- Wilson Álvarez
- Jacob Amaya
- Brian N. Anderson
- Bryan Anderson
- Drew Anderson
- Hal Anderson
- John Anderson
- Justin Anderson
- Larry Anderson
- Tim Anderson
- Mike Andrews
- Elvis Andrus
- Luis Andújar
- Luis Aparicio
- Pete Appleton
- Luke Appling
- Sam Antonacci
- Maurice Archdeacon
- Rudy Árias
- Charlie Armbruster
- Gerry Arrigo
- Cody Asche
- Ken Ash
- Paul Assenmacher
- Jake Atz
- Chick Autry
- Earl Averill Jr.
- Alex Avila
- Luis Avilán
- Dylan Axelrod

== B ==
- Stan Bahnsen
- Harold Baines
- Jeff Bajenaru
- Floyd Baker
- Howard Baker
- Brooks Baldwin
- Dave Baldwin
- James Baldwin
- Tanner Banks
- Alan Bannister
- Floyd Bannister
- Manny Bañuelos
- Lorenzo Barceló
- Charlie Barnabe
- Bob Barnes
- Red Barnes
- Rich Barnes
- Salomé Barojas
- Bill Barrett
- Francisco Barrios
- Cuke Barrows
- Les Bartholomew
- Chris Bassitt
- Earl Battey
- Jim Battle
- Matt Batts
- Frank Baumann
- Jim Baumer
- Ross Baumgarten
- Johnny Beall
- Ted Beard
- Gene Bearden
- Chris Beck
- Gordon Beckham
- Kevin Beirne
- Ollie Bejma
- Tim Belcher
- Ronald Belisario
- Gary Bell
- George Bell
- Kevin Bell
- Ralph Bell
- Albert Belle
- Esteban Beltré
- Chief Bender
- Andrew Benintendi
- Yamil Benítez
- Joe Benz
- Jason Bere
- Moe Berg
- Boze Berger
- Joe Berger
- Marty Berghammer
- Tony Bernazard
- Dennis Berran
- Prelander Berroa
- Charlie Berry
- Claude Berry
- Ken Berry
- Neil Berry
- Mike Bertotti
- Wilson Betemit
- Terry Bevington
- Rocky Biddle
- Charlie Biggs
- John Bischoff
- Hi Bithorn
- Jeff Bittiger
- Bill Black
- Verne Blackbourn
- Lena Blackburne*
- George Blackerby
- Ossie Blanco
- Homer Blankenship
- Ted Blankenship
- Bruno Block
- Ron Blomberg
- Lu Blue
- Geoff Blum
- Milt Bocek
- Ping Bodie
- Bob Boken
- Greg Bollo
- Rodney Bolton
- Bobby Bonds
- Bobby Bonilla
- Zeke Bonura
- Buddy Booker
- Ike Boone
- Ray Boone
- Cam Booser
- Joe Borchard
- Frenchy Bordagaray
- Pat Borders
- Glenn Borgmann
- Babe Borton
- Thad Bosley
- Daryl Boston
- Billy Bowers
- Grant Bowler
- Emmett Bowles
- Red Bowser
- Bob Boyd
- Ken Boyer
- Harry Boyles
- Buddy Bradford
- Chad Bradford
- Fred Bradley
- Phil Bradley
- Scott Bradley
- Tom Bradley
- Doug Brady
- Dave Brain
- Rob Brantly
- Fred Bratschi
- Ángel Bravo
- Garland Braxton
- Jim Breazeale
- John Brebbia
- Tom Brennan
- Jim Breton
- Ken Brett
- Alan Brice
- Jim Brideweser
- Bunny Brief
- Chuck Brinkman
- Lance Broadway
- Jack Brohamer
- Jim Brosnan
- Clint Brown
- Delos Brown
- Dick Brown
- Hal Brown
- Joe Brown
- George Browne
- Jack Bruner
- Brian Bruney
- Warren Brusstar
- Hal Bubser
- Mark Buehrle
- Don Buford
- Ryan Bukvich
- Aaron Bummer
- Zack Burdi
- Jake Burger
- Smoky Burgess
- Jamie Burke
- Jimmy Burke
- Sean Burke
- Ellis Burks
- Bill Burns
- Britt Burns
- Joe Burns
- Ryan Burr
- Jim Busby
- Donie Bush*
- Ky Bush
- John Buzhardt
- Harry Byrd
- Bobby Byrne
- Jerry Byrne
- Tommy Byrne

== C ==
- Melky Cabrera
- Orlando Cabrera
- Leon Cadore
- Bob Cain
- Sugar Cain
- George Caithamer
- Ivan Calderón
- Earl Caldwell
- Nixey Callahan*
- Johnny Callison
- Mike Cameron
- Bruce Campbell
- John Cangelosi
- Jonathan Cannon
- José Canseco
- Vinny Capra
- Pat Caraway
- Andy Carey
- Cisco Carlos
- Steve Carlton
- Eddie Carnet
- D. J. Carrasco
- Alex Carrasquel
- Chico Carrasquel
- Cam Carreon
- Clay Carroll
- Scott Carroll
- Jeff Carter
- Mike Caruso
- Chuck Cary
- Raúl Casanova
- Norm Cash
- Larry Casian
- Carlos Castillo
- Tony Castillo
- Welington Castillo
- Vince Castino
- Paul Castner
- Miguel Castro
- Ramón Castro
- Simón Castro
- Danny Cater
- Wayne Causey
- Phil Cavarretta
- Dylan Cease
- Domingo Cedeño
- Xavier Cedeño
- Bob Chakales
- Bill Chamberlain
- Joe Chamberlain
- Ben Chapman
- Harry Chappas
- Larry Chappell
- Hal Chase
- Italo Chelini
- Felix Chouinard
- Chief Chouneau
- McKay Christensen
- Bob Christian
- Steve Christmas
- Loyd Christopher
- Eddie Cicotte
- Alex Cintrón
- Steve Cishek
- Bill Cissell
- Ralph Citarella
- Aaron Civale
- Bud Clancy
- Allie Clark
- Bryan Clark
- Pep Clark
- Grey Clarke
- Royce Clayton
- Chris Clemons
- Maikel Cleto
- Mike Clevinger
- Tyler Clippard
- Gil Coan
- Dave Cochrane
- Rich Coggins
- Oscar Colás
- Rocky Colavito
- Mike Colbern
- Bert Cole
- Willis Cole
- Ray Coleman
- Eddie Collins*
- Shano Collins
- Zack Collins
- Álex Colomé
- Bartolo Colón
- Bob Coluccio
- Ramón Conde
- Jocko Conlan
- Sarge Connally
- Bill Connelly
- Merv Connors
- Sandy Consuegra
- José Contreras
- Nardi Contreras
- Dennis Cook
- Cecil Coombs
- Joey Cora
- Ryan Cordell
- Jimmy Cordero
- Wil Cordero
- Ed Corey
- Roy Corhan
- Ed Correa
- Red Corriden*
- Jess Cortazzo
- Neal Cotts
- Clint Courtney
- Harry Courtney
- Dylan Covey
- Wes Covington
- Joe Cowley
- Bill Cox
- Ernie Cox
- George Cox
- Les Cox
- Roy Crabb
- Rod Craig
- Jesse Crain
- Gavvy Cravath
- Joe Crede
- Kyle Crick
- Jerry Crider
- Garrett Crochet
- Chris Cron
- Declan Cronin
- Buck Crouse
- Henry Cruz
- Julio Cruz
- Nelson Cruz
- Todd Cruz
- Tommy Cruz
- Tony Cuccinello
- Charlie Cuellar
- Johnny Cueto
- Tim Cullen
- Dick Culler
- Joe Cunningham
- Guy Curtright
- Cheslor Cuthbert
- Mike Cvengros

== D ==
- Pete Daglia
- Jerry Dahlke
- Bruce Dal Canton
- Bobby Dalbec
- Mark Dalesandro
- Tom Daly (C)
- Tom Daly (2B)
- Pat Daneker
- Dave Danforth
- Tyler Danish
- John Danks
- Jordan Danks
- Vic Darensbourg
- Matt Davidson
- Danny Darwin
- Jeff Darwin
- Wally Dashiell
- Brian Daubach
- Joe Davenport
- Lum Davenport
- Ben Davis
- Dixie Davis
- George Davis
- Ike Davis
- Joel Davis
- John Davis
- Tommy Davis
- Bill Dawley
- Dewon Day
- Alejandro De Aza
- Enyel De Los Santos
- Dave DeBusschere
- Mike DeGerick
- Paul DeJong
- José DeLeón
- Flame Delhi
- Jason Dellaero
- Nicky Delmonico
- Zach DeLoach
- Jim Delsing
- Joe DeMaestri
- Ray Demmitt
- Drew Denson
- Bucky Dent
- Sam Dente
- Jim Derrington
- Joe DeSa
- Odrisamer Despaigne
- Ross Detwiler
- Mike Devereaux
- Bernie DeViveiros
- Al DeVormer
- Félix Díaz
- Mike Diaz
- Rob Dibble
- George Dickey
- Johnny Dickshot
- Jake Diekman
- Bill Dietrich
- Steve Dillard
- Bob Dillinger
- Miguel Diloné
- John Dobb
- Jess Dobernic
- Joe Dobson
- Larry Doby*
- Cozy Dolan
- Jiggs Donahue
- Dick Donovan
- Harry Dorish
- Charlie Dorman
- Richard Dotson
- Patsy Dougherty
- Octavio Dotel
- Tom Dougherty
- Phil Douglas
- Brian Downing
- Scott Downs
- Doug Drabek
- Moe Drabowsky
- Brian Drahman
- Kelly Dransfeldt
- Tom Drees
- Walt Dropo
- Cecil Duff
- Hugh Duffy*
- Dan Dugan
- Gus Dundon
- Davey Dunkle
- Adam Dunn
- Mike Dunne
- Dane Dunning
- Frank Dupee
- Ed Durham
- Ray Durham
- Jerry Dybzinski
- Jermaine Dye
- Jimmie Dykes*
- Jarrod Dyson

== E ==
- George Earnshaw
- Ted Easterly
- Adam Eaton
- Vallie Eaves
- Don Eddy
- Mike Eden
- Jake Eder
- Paul Edmondson
- Hank Edwards
- Jim Joe Edwards
- Wayne Edwards
- Tom Egan
- Jack Egbert
- Ike Eichrodt
- Brandon Eisert
- Cal Eldred
- Lee Elia
- Tim Elko
- Fraser Ellard
- Bob Elliott
- Duke Ellis
- Sammy Ellis
- Roy Elsh
- Alan Embree
- Slim Embrey
- Edwin Encarnación
- Adam Engel
- Charlie English
- Del Ennis
- George Enright
- Mutz Ens
- Joe Erautt
- Chico Escárrega
- Eduardo Escobar
- Sammy Esposito
- Mark Esser
- Jim Essian
- Art Evans
- Bill Evans
- Red Evans
- Carl Everett
- Johnny Evers*
- Sam Ewing
- Scott Eyre

== F ==
- Red Faber
- Jorge Fábregas
- Ferris Fain
- Bibb Falk
- Bob Fallon
- Bob Farley
- Ed Farmer
- Danny Farquhar
- Kerby Farrell
- Joe Fautsch
- Erick Fedde
- Dutch Fehring
- Happy Felsch
- Hod Fenner
- Ed Fernandes
- Alex Fernández
- Don Ferrarese
- Clarence Fieber
- Josh Fields
- Lou Fiene
- Pete Filson
- Steve Fireovid
- Bill Fischer
- Carl Fischer
- Eddie Fisher
- Jack Fisher
- Carlton Fisk
- Patsy Flaherty
- Tom Flanigan
- John Flannery
- Roy Flaskamper
- Dominic Fletcher
- Scott Fletcher
- Chris Flexen
- Bernardo Flores
- Tyler Flowers
- Gavin Floyd
- Josh Fogg
- Marv Foley
- Lew Fonseca*
- Chad Fonville
- Gene Ford
- Tom Fordham
- Brook Fordyce
- Happy Foreman
- Mike Fornieles
- Terry Forster
- Tim Fortugno
- George Foster
- Matt Foster
- Pop Foster
- Bob Fothergill
- Keith Foulke
- Jack Fournier
- Nellie Fox
- Ken Frailing
- Frank Francisco
- Julio Franco
- Tito Francona
- Caleb Frare
- Jason Frasor
- Clint Frazier
- Lou Frazier
- Todd Frazier
- Vic Frazier
- Caleb Freeman
- Marvin Freeman
- Gene Freese
- Jake Freeze
- Charlie French
- Ray French
- Dave Frost
- Jace Fry
- Kosuke Fukudome
- Carson Fulmer
- Liz Funk

== G ==
- Frank Gabler
- Dave Gallagher
- Phil Gallivan
- Oscar Gamble
- Chick Gandil
- Avisaíl García
- Deivi García
- Freddy García
- Leury García
- Mike Garcia
- Ramón García
- Willy García
- Jon Garland
- Dustin Garneau
- Ralph Garr
- Hank Garrity
- Ned Garvin
- Milt Gaston
- Joe Gates
- Pete Gebrian
- Jim Geddes
- Johnny Gerlach
- Al Gettel
- Chris Getz
- George Gick
- Mark Gilbert
- Tyler Gilbert
- Brian J. Giles
- Conor Gillaspie
- Claral Gillenwater
- Bob Gillespie
- Héctor Giménez
- Joe Ginsberg
- Matt Ginter
- Lucas Giolito
- Kid Gleason
- Jerry Don Gleaton
- Ross Gload
- Gary Glover
- Jimmy Gobble
- Bill Gogolewski
- Ryan Goins
- Brad Goldberg
- Gordon Goldsberry
- Stan Goletz
- Jeanmar Gómez
- Yoendrys Gómez
- Alfredo González
- Andy González
- Gio González
- Jacob Gonzalez
- Luis González
- Miguel González (catcher)
- Miguel González (pitcher)
- Romy González
- Wikelman González
- Wilbur Good
- John Goodell
- Billy Goodman
- Brian Goodwin
- Jim Goodwin
- Tom Gordon
- Rich Gossage
- Johnny Grabowski
- Tony Graffanino
- Roy Graham
- Kendall Graveman
- Johnny Groth
- Yasmani Grandal
- Wayne Granger
- Jimmy Grant
- Jeff Gray
- Lorenzo Gray
- Ted Gray
- Craig Grebeck
- Danny Green
- Tyler Greene
- Paul Gregory
- Clark Griffith
- Jason Grilli
- Ken Griffey Jr.
- Ross Grimsley
- Marv Grissom
- Robbie Grossman
- Ernest Groth
- Johnny Groth
- Orval Grove
- Frank Grube
- Javy Guerra
- Ozzie Guillén*
- Tom Gulley
- Randy Gumpert
- Don Gutteridge*

== H ==
- Bert Haas
- Mule Haas
- Warren Hacker
- Bump Hadley
- Mickey Haefner
- Charlie Haeger
- Bud Hafey
- Ed Hahn
- Jerry Hairston, Sr.
- Sammy Hairston
- Chet Hajduk
- Joe Hall
- Toby Hall
- Jack Hallett
- Bill Hallman
- Billy Hamilton
- Dave Hamilton
- Ian Hamilton
- Jack Hamilton
- Steve Hamilton
- Atlee Hammaker
- Ralph Hamner
- Fred Hancock
- Ron Hansen
- Don Hanski
- Alen Hanson
- John Happenny
- Pat Hardgrove
- Jack Hardy
- Lucas Harrell
- Dave Harris
- Spencer Harris
- Willie Harris
- Josh Harrison
- Earl Harrist
- Jack Harshman
- Hub Hart
- Fred Hartman
- Zaza Harvey
- Ziggy Hasbrook
- Adam Haseley
- Ron Hassey
- Fred Hatfield
- Grady Hatton
- Austin Hays
- Frankie Hayes
- Jackie Hayes
- Joe Haynes
- Bill Heath
- Deunte Heath
- Spencer Heath
- Mike Heathcott
- Val Heim
- Woodie Held
- Scott Hemond
- Frank Hemphill
- Joe Henderson
- Ken Henderson
- Liam Hendriks
- Butch Henline
- Dutch Henry
- Ray Herbert
- Ed Herrmann
- Dustin Hermanson
- César Hernández
- Orlando Hernández
- Pedro Hernández
- Roberto Hernández
- Rudy Hernández
- Kelvin Herrera
- Art Herring
- Ed Herrmann
- Mike Hershberger
- Codi Heuer
- Joe Heving
- Mike Heydon
- Greg Hibbard
- Kevin Hickey
- Charlie Hickman
- Jim Hicks
- Joe Hicks
- Bill Higdon
- Dennis Higgins
- Derek Hill
- Donnie Hill
- Ken Hill
- Marc Hill
- Tim Hill
- Shawn Hillegas
- Rich Hinton
- Myril Hoag
- Oris Hockett
- Johnny Hodapp
- Shovel Hodge
- Ralph Hodgin
- Dutch Hoffman
- Guy Hoffman
- Ken Holcombe
- Derek Holland
- Al Hollingsworth
- David Holmberg
- Ducky Holmes
- Brent Honeywell Jr.
- Harry Hooper
- Gail Hopkins
- Marty Hopkins
- Joe Horlen
- Ricky Horton
- Ken Hottman
- Charlie Hough
- Adrian Houser
- Joe Hovlik
- Bruce Howard
- Chris Howard
- Fred Howard
- Dixie Howell
- Dann Howitt
- Bobby Howry
- Dummy Hoy
- LaMarr Hoyt
- Bryan Hudson
- Daniel Hudson
- Hal Hudson
- Orlando Hudson
- Frank Huelsman
- Mike Huff
- Ed Hughes
- Jim Hughes
- Tim Hulett
- Philip Humber
- Johnny Humphries
- Bill Hunnefield
- Steve Huntz
- Ira Hutchinson

== I ==
- Tadahito Iguchi
- Gregory Infante
- Jairo Iriarte
- Frank Isbell

== J ==
- Austin Jackson
- Bo Jackson
- Charlie Jackson
- Darrin Jackson
- Edwin Jackson
- Mike Jackson
- Ron Jackson
- Shoeless Joe Jackson
- Elmer Jacobs
- Otto Jacobs
- Pat Jacquez
- Bill James
- Bob James
- Jerry Janeski
- Travis Jankowski
- Jon Jay
- Jesse Jefferson
- Irv Jeffries
- John Jenkins
- Joe Jenkins
- Bobby Jenks
- Dan Jennings
- Johnny Jeter
- Shawn Jeter
- D'Angelo Jiménez
- Eloy Jiménez
- Tommy John
- Pete Johns
- Bart Johnson
- Charles Johnson
- Connie Johnson
- Dan Johnson
- Dane Johnson
- Darrell Johnson
- Deron Johnson
- Don Johnson
- Ellis Johnson
- Erik Johnson
- Ernie Johnson
- Johnny Johnson
- Lamar Johnson
- Lance Johnson
- Larry Johnson
- Mark L. Johnson
- Randy Johnson
- Stan Johnson
- Jimmy Johnston
- Jay Johnstone
- Stan Jok
- Smead Jolley
- Al Jones
- Andruw Jones
- Barry Jones
- Charlie Jones
- Cleon Jones
- Davy Jones
- Deacon Jones
- Fielder Jones*
- Greg Jones
- Jake Jones
- Nate Jones
- Sad Sam Jones
- Stacy Jones
- Steve Jones
- Tex Jones
- Bubber Jonnard
- Rip Jordan
- Tom Jordan
- Duane Josephson
- Ted Jourdan
- Mike Joyce
- Howie Judson
- Corey Julks

== K ==
- Jim Kaat
- Tommy Kahnle
- Frank Kalin
- Willie Kamm
- John Kane
- Matt Karchner
- Ron Karkovice
- Jack Katoll
- Charlie Kavanagh
- Steve Kealey
- Pat Keedy
- Bob Keegan
- Jarred Kelenic
- George Kell
- Brad Keller
- Joe Kelly
- Pat Kelly
- Red Kelly
- Russ Kemmerer
- Steve Kemp
- Bill Kennedy
- Bob Kennedy
- Vern Kennedy
- Dick Kenworthy
- Joe Keough
- Jeff Keppinger
- Gus Keriazakos
- Jim Kern
- Dickie Kerr
- John Kerr
- Don Kessinger
- Dallas Keuchel
- Brian Keyser
- Joe Kiefer
- Craig Kimbrel
- Bruce Kimm
- Chad Kimsey
- Ellis Kinder
- Eric King
- Jim King
- Josh Kinney
- Harry Kinzy
- Don Kirkwood
- Joe Kirrene
- Ron Kittle
- Hugo Klaerner
- Fred Klages
- Ed Klepfer
- Ed Klieman
- Joe Klinger
- Ted Kluszewski
- Chris Knapp
- Bill Knickerbocker
- Bobby Knoop
- Jack Knott
- Billy Koch
- Don Kolloway
- Michael Kopech
- Paul Konerko
- Jerry Koosman
- Mark Kotsay
- Fabian Kowalik
- Al Kozar
- Ken Kravec
- Mike Kreevich
- Ralph Kreitz
- Chuck Kress
- Red Kress
- Lou Kretlow
- Chad Kreuter
- Frank Kreutzer
- Rocky Krsnich
- John Kruk
- Jack Kucek
- Joe Kuhel
- Chad Kuhl
- Walt Kuhn
- Rusty Kuntz
- Art Kusnyer
- Jerry Kutzler
- Bob Kuzava

== L ==
- Lerrin LaGrow
- Brady Lail
- Jack Lamabe
- Jake Lamb
- Jimmy Lambert
- Ryan LaMarre
- Fred Lamlein
- Gene Lamont*
- Dennis Lamp
- Ken Landenberger
- Jim Landis
- Jesse Landrum
- Dick Lane
- Frank Lange
- Paul LaPalme
- Dave LaPoint
- Jack Lapp
- Don Larsen
- Tony La Russa*
- Frank Lary
- Bill Lathrop
- Barry Latman
- Mike LaValliere
- Rudy Law
- Vance Law
- Bob Lawrence
- Brett Lawrie
- Danny Lazar
- Terry Leach
- Jordan Leasure
- Carlos Lee
- Korey Lee
- Thornton Lee
- George Lees
- Charles Leesman
- Ron LeFlore
- Paul Lehner
- Nemo Leibold
- Elmer Leifer
- Dummy Leitner
- Bob Lemon*
- Chet Lemon
- Jim Lemon
- Dave Lemonds
- Don Lenhardt
- Eddie Leon
- Dominic Leone
- Rudy Leopold
- Ted Lepcio
- Dixie Leverett
- Al Levine
- Darren Lewis
- Jeff Liefer
- Brent Lillibridge
- Shane Lindsay
- Bill Lindsey
- Doug Lindsey
- Chuck Lindstrom
- Matt Lindstrom
- Scott Linebrink
- Francisco Liriano
- Rymer Liriano
- Bryan Little
- Dick Littlefield
- Esteban Loaiza
- Bob Locker
- Dario Lodigiani
- Kenny Lofton
- Boone Logan
- Ron Lolich
- Sherm Lollar
- Tim Lollar
- Bill Long
- Jeoff Long
- Jimmie Long
- Dean Look
- Ed Lopat
- Al López
- José López
- Nicky Lopez
- Pedro López
- Reynaldo López
- Harry Lord
- Andrew Lorraine
- Mem Lovett
- Jay Loviglio
- Grover Lowdermilk
- Sean Lowe
- Turk Lown
- Donny Lucy
- David Lundquist
- Tony Lupien
- Greg Luzinski
- Sparky Lyle
- Byrd Lynn
- Lance Lynn
- Barry Lyons
- Steve Lyons
- Ted Lyons
- Jim Lyttle

== M ==
- Mike MacDougal
- Robert Machado
- Frank Mack
- Rob Mackowiak
- Ed Madjeski
- Nick Madrigal
- Jim Magnuson
- George Magoon
- Joe Magrane
- Bob Mahoney
- Hank Majeski
- Martin Maldonado
- Jule Mallonee
- Eddie Malone
- Gordon Maltzberger
- Carl Manda
- Leo Mangum
- Johnny Mann
- Fred Manrique
- Jerry Manuel *
- Moxie Manuel
- Ravelo Manzanillo
- Johnny Marcum
- Jhan Mariñez
- Marty Marion *
- Jake Marisnick
- Dick Marlowe
- Isidro Márquez
- Jeffrey Marquez
- Fred Marsh
- Evan Marshall
- Willard Marshall
- Dámaso Marte
- Davis Martin
- J. C. Martin
- Joe Martin
- Morrie Martin
- Norberto Martín
- Carlos Martínez
- Dave Martinez
- Silvio Martínez
- Randy Martz
- Phil Masi
- Nick Masset
- John Matias
- Nick Maton
- Wally Mattick
- Mark Mauldin
- Charlie Maxwell
- Carlos May
- Milt May
- Jacob May
- Lee Maye
- Erskine Mayer
- Wally Mayer
- Nomar Mazara
- Jack McAleese
- Jim McAnany
- Pryor McBee
- Ken McBride
- Dick McCabe
- Brian McCall
- James McCann
- Brandon McCarthy
- Tom McCarthy
- Kirk McCaskill
- Hervey McClellan
- Amby McConnell
- Mike McCormick
- Tommy McCraw
- Rodney McCray
- Harry McCurdy
- Jim McDonald
- Jack McDowell
- Chuck McElroy
- Ed McFarland
- Herm McFarland
- Ed McGhee
- Lynn McGlothen
- Jim McGlothlin
- Reese McGuire
- Tom McGuire
- Stover McIlwain
- Matty McIntyre
- Hal McKain
- Joel McKeon
- Rich McKinney
- Polly McLarry
- Cal McLish
- Sam McMackin
- Don McMahon
- Fred McMullin
- Eric McNair
- Jerry McNertney
- Dallas McPherson
- Alex McRae
- Doug McWeeny
- Curtis Mead
- Chase Meidroth
- Sam Mele
- Paul Meloan
- Bill Melton
- Bob Melvin
- Danny Mendick
- Yermín Mercedes
- Lloyd Merriman
- Sam Mertes
- Matt Merullo
- Bobby Messenger
- Catfish Metkovich
- William Metzig
- Alex Metzler
- Billy Meyer
- George Meyer
- Cass Michaels
- John Michaelson
- Keynan Middleton
- Aaron Miles
- Lastings Milledge
- Bob Miller
- Corky Miller
- Frank Miller
- Jake Miller
- Juan Minaya
- Minnie Miñoso
- Willy Miranda
- Roy Mitchell
- George Mogridge
- Gustavo Molina
- Bob Molinaro
- Richie Moloney
- Yoan Moncada
- Larry Monroe
- Aurelio Monteagudo
- Agustín Montero
- Braden Montgomery
- Colson Montgomery
- Barry Moore
- Jim Moore
- Jimmy Moore
- Junior Moore
- Randy Moore
- Ray Moore
- Rich Morales
- Bill Moran
- Ray Morehart
- Brent Morel
- George Moriarty
- Russ Morman
- Bugs Morris
- Jim Morrison
- Jo-Jo Morrissey
- Jerry Moses
- Wally Moses
- Les Moss*
- Don Mossi
- Johnny Mostil
- Glen Moulder
- Lyle Mouton
- Bill Mueller
- Don Mueller
- Greg Mulleavy
- Charlie Mullen
- Eddie Mulligan
- Fran Mullins
- Dominic Mulrenan
- Arnie Muñoz
- José Muñoz
- Steve Mura
- Munetaka Murakami
- Penn Murfee
- Danny Murphy
- Eddie Murphy
- George Murray
- Tanner Murray
- Tony Muser
- Brett Myers
- Mike Myers
- Aaron Myette

== N ==
- Bill Nagel
- Bill Nahorodny
- Frank Naleway
- Tyler Naquin
- Omar Narváez
- Cotton Nash
- Nick Nastrini
- Edgar Navarro
- Jaime Navarro
- Bernie Neis
- Andy Nelson
- Gene Nelson
- Jeff Nelson
- Rocky Nelson
- Roger Nelson
- Jack Ness
- Dan Neumeier
- Warren Newson
- Gus Niarhos
- Don Nicholas
- Reid Nichols
- Dave Nicholson
- Scott Nielsen
- Bob Nieman
- Randy Niemann
- Adrián Nieto
- Rikuu Nishida
- Jayson Nix
- Ryan Noda
- Héctor Noesí
- Tim Nordbrook
- Wayne Nordhagen
- Bill Norman
- Ron Northey
- Greg Norton
- Iván Nova
- Win Noyes
- Jhonny Núñez
- Chris Nyman
- Jerry Nyman
- Nyls Nyman

== O ==
- Buck O'Brien
- Charlie O'Brien
- Syd O'Brien
- Tom O'Malley
- Bill O'Neill
- Emmett O'Neill
- Dennis O'Toole
- Jim O'Toole
- Blue Moon Odom
- Will Ohman
- Miguel Olivo
- Ray Olmedo
- Fred Olmstead
- Brian Omogrosso
- Magglio Ordóñez
- Joe Orengo
- Jorge Orta
- Rafael Ortega
- José Ortiz
- Ozzie Osborn
- Josh Osich
- Dan Osinski
- Claude Osteen
- Red Ostergard
- Johnny Ostrowski
- Antonio Osuna
- Jim Otten
- Frank Owen
- Marv Owen
- Frank Owens
- Jerry Owens
- Pablo Ozuna

== P ==
- Tom Paciorek
- Del Paddock
- Nicholas Padilla
- Jedixson Paez
- Joshua Palacios
- Jake Palisch
- Daniel Palka
- Donn Pall
- José Paniagua
- Al Papai
- Frank Papish
- Freddy Parent
- Kelly Paris
- Jim Parque
- Casey Parsons
- Johnny Pasek
- Dan Pasqua
- Luis Patiño
- Ham Patterson
- Ken Patterson
- Reggie Patterson
- Roy Patterson
- Josh Paul
- Felipe Paulino
- Don Pavletich
- John Pawlowski
- Fred Payne
- George Payne
- Mark Payton
- Ike Pearson
- Jake Peavy
- Roger Peckinpaugh
- Elvis Peguero
- Mike Pelfrey
- Jesús Peña
- Tony Peña (catcher)
- Tony Peña (pitcher)
- Elmer Pence
- Rusty Pence
- Sammy Peralta
- Jack Perconte
- Everson Pereira
- Carlos Pérez
- Martín Pérez
- Mélido Pérez
- Timo Pérez
- John Perkovich
- Len Perme
- Herb Perry
- Stan Perzanowski
- Gary Peters
- Rube Peters
- Tristan Peters
- Adam Peterson
- Buddy Peterson
- Jake Petricka
- Tommy Pham
- Josh Phegley
- Ray Phelps
- Dave Philley
- Bubba Phillips
- Heath Phillips
- Taylor Phillips
- Tony Phillips
- Wiley Piatt
- Billy Pierce
- Marino Pieretti
- Juan Pierre
- A. J. Pierzynski
- Tony Piet
- Al Pilarcik
- Kevin Pillar
- Babe Pinelli
- Skip Pitlock
- Juan Pizarro
- Whitey Platt
- Scott Podsednik
- Cliff Politte
- Howie Pollet
- A. J. Pollock
- John Pomorski
- Aaron Poreda
- Irv Porter
- Mike Porzio
- Bob Poser
- Bob Powell
- Frank Pratt
- Bob Priddy
- Bret Prinz
- Red Proctor
- Mike Proly
- Ron Pruitt
- Greg Pryor
- Bill Pulsipher
- David Purcey
- Pid Purdy
- Billy Purtell
- Zach Putnam
- J. J. Putz

== Q ==
- Jim Qualls
- Tom Qualters
- Carlos Quentin
- Edgar Quero
- Lee Quillen
- Finners Quinlan
- Jack Quinn
- José Quintana
- Jamie Quirk

== R ==
- Rip Radcliff
- Don Rader
- Doug Rader*
- Scott Radinsky
- Pat Ragan
- Tim Raines
- Alexei Ramírez
- Julio Ramírez
- Manny Ramirez
- Yohan Ramírez
- Bryan Ramos
- Lane Ramsey
- Sap Randall
- Earl Rapp
- Fred Rath, Sr.
- Morrie Rath
- Jon Rauch
- Claude Raymond
- Buck Redfern
- Gary Redus
- Addison Reed
- A. J. Reed
- Ron Reed
- Phil Regan
- Rick Reichardt
- Barney Reilly
- Zach Remillard
- Steve Renko
- Tony Rensa
- Jerry Reuss
- Carl Reynolds
- Danny Reynolds
- Bobby Rhawn
- Hal Rhyne
- Dennis Ribant
- Danny Richar
- Clayton Richard
- Lee Richard
- Paul Richards*
- Marv Rickert
- Johnny Riddle
- André Rienzo
- Dave Righetti
- Johnny Rigney
- Alex Ríos
- Armando Ríos
- Swede Risberg
- David Riske
- Todd Ritchie
- Jim Rivera
- Tink Riviere
- Todd Rizzo
- Bert Roberge
- Luis Robert
- Charlie Robertson
- David Robertson
- Mike Robertson
- Will Robertson
- Billy Jo Robidoux
- Aaron Robinson
- Chuckie Robinson
- Dewey Robinson
- Eddie Robinson
- Floyd Robinson
- Les Rock
- Carlos Rodon
- Aurelio Rodríguez
- Héctor Rodríguez
- José Rodríguez
- Liu Rodríguez
- Saul Rogovin
- George Rohe
- Josh Rojas
- Johnny Romano
- Vicente Romo
- Bruce Rondón
- Gilberto Rondón
- José Rondón
- Phil Roof
- Bob Roselli
- Lou Rosenberg
- Steve Rosenberg
- Larry Rosenthal
- Buck Ross
- Marv Rotblatt
- Braggo Roth
- Frank Roth
- Jack Rothrock
- Gene Rounsaville
- Edd Roush
- Aaron Rowand
- Pants Rowland*
- Jerry Royster
- Don Rudolph
- Muddy Ruel
- José Ruiz
- Scott Ruffcorn
- Red Ruffing
- Bob Rush
- Adam Russell
- John Russell
- Reb Russell
- Mark Ryal
- Blondy Ryan
- Connie Ryan

== S ==
- Chris Sabo
- Bob Sadowski
- Olmedo Sáenz
- Tyler Saladino
- Mark Salas
- Luis Salazar
- Chris Sale
- Bill Salkeld
- Jack Salveson
- Ángel Sánchez
- Yolmer Sánchez
- David Sanders
- Scott Sanderson
- David Sandlin
- Ervin Santana
- Hector Santiago
- Ron Santo
- Gregory Santos
- Sergio Santos
- Nelson Santovenia
- Rich Sauveur
- Carl Sawatski
- Steve Sax
- Rob Scahill
- Jerry Scala
- Randy Scarbery
- Ray Scarborough
- Jeff Schaefer
- Jimmie Schaffer
- Ray Schalk*
- Roy Schalk
- Biff Schaller
- Norm Schlueter
- Dave Schmidt
- Scott Schoeneweis
- Jesse Scholtens
- Ossee Schreckengost
- Hank Schreiber
- Ron Schueler
- Noah Schultz
- Webb Schultz
- Ferdie Schupp
- Jeff Schwarz
- Tyler Schweitzer
- Jim Scoggins
- Herb Score
- Everett Scott
- Jim Scott
- Ray Searage
- Tom Seaver
- Don Secrist
- Bob Seeds
- Pat Seerey
- José Segura
- Ricky Seilheimer
- Carey Selph
- Marcus Semien
- Nick Senzel
- Leyson Séptimo
- Anderson Severino
- Luke Sewell
- Bill Sharp
- Al Shaw
- Bob Shaw
- Bryan Shaw
- Jeff Shaw
- Merv Shea
- Bud Sheely
- Earl Sheely
- Gavin Sheets
- Frank Shellenback
- Braden Shewmake
- James Shields
- Joe Shipley
- Art Shires
- Ray Shook
- Bill Shores
- Dave Short
- Clyde Shoun
- Frank Shugart
- Jared Shuster
- Moisés Sierra
- Rubén Sierra
- Roy Sievers
- Frank Sigafoos
- Ken Silvestri
- Al Sima
- Bill Simas
- Al Simmons
- Brian Simmons
- Mel Simons
- Harry Simpson
- Chris Singleton
- Mike Sirotka
- Andrew Sisco
- Tommie Sisk
- Jim Siwy
- Bud Sketchley
- Joel Skinner
- Lou Skizas
- Matt Skole
- John Skopec
- Bill Skowron
- Austin Slater
- Jack Slattery
- Don Slaught
- Roy Smalley
- Joe Smaza
- Al Smith
- Art Smith
- Bob Smith
- Charlie Smith
- Eddie Smith
- Ernie Smith
- Frank Smith
- Hagen Smith
- Harry Smith
- Kevan Smith
- Pop-Boy Smith
- Shane Smith
- Roxy Snipes
- Scott Snodgress
- Chris Snopek
- Cory Snyder
- John Snyder
- Russ Snyder
- Eric Soderholm
- Eddie Solomon
- Moose Solters
- Joakim Soria
- Michael Soroka
- Lenyn Sosa
- Sammy Sosa
- Geovany Soto
- Steve Souchock
- Bennett Sousa
- Floyd Speer
- Bob Spence
- Jim Spencer
- Tom Spencer
- Ed Spiezio
- Dan Spillner
- Mike Squires
- Marv Staehle
- Gerry Staley
- Lee Stange
- Joe Stanka
- Eddie Stanky*
- Mike T. Stanton
- Matt Stark
- Milt Steengrafe
- Dave Stegman
- Bill Stein
- Hank Steinbacher
- Gene Stephens
- Vern Stephens
- Joe Stephenson
- Bud Stewart
- Chris Stewart
- Frank Stewart
- Jimmy Stewart
- Josh Stewart
- Zach Stewart
- Dave Stieb
- Jonathan Stiever
- Royle Stillman
- Lee Stine
- Chuck Stobbs
- Tim Stoddard
- Dean Stone
- Steve Stone
- John Stoneham
- Dick Strahs
- Sammy Strang
- Monty Stratton
- Elmer Stricklett
- Jake Striker
- Ed Stroud
- Amos Strunk
- Eric Stults
- George Stumpf
- Tanyon Sturtze
- Joe Sugden
- Billy Sullivan*
- Billy Sullivan (Jr)
- John Sullivan
- Scott Sullivan
- Eric Surkamp
- Max Surkont
- Harry Suter
- Leo Sutherland
- Dale Sveum
- Evar Swanson
- Karl Swanson
- Anthony Swarzak
- Ryan Sweeney
- Augie Swentor
- Bill Swift
- Nick Swisher

== T ==
- Doug Taitt
- Shingo Takatsu
- Fred Tallbot
- Leo Tankersley
- Lee Tannehill
- Bruce Tanner
- Chuck Tanner*
- Kevin Tapani
- Danny Tartabull
- Bennie Tate
- Ken Tatum
- Fred Tauby
- Mike Tauchman
- Grant Taylor
- Leo Taylor
- Michael A. Taylor
- Michael Taylor
- Wiley Taylor
- Mark Teahen
- Kyle Teel
- Ryan Tepera
- Luis Terrero
- Zeb Terry
- Matt Thaiss
- Bobby Thigpen
- Frank Thomas
- Larry Thomas
- Leo Thomas
- Tommy Thomas
- Jim Thome
- Lee Thompson
- Taylor Thompson
- Tommy Thompson
- Trayce Thompson
- Matt Thornton
- Drew Thorpe
- Erick Threets
- Sloppy Thurston
- Dick Tidrow
- Verle Tiefenthaler
- Les Tietje
- Charlie Tilson
- Ron Tingley
- Joe Tipton
- Wayne Tolleson
- Jeff Torborg*
- Earl Torgeson
- Pablo Torrealba
- Carlos Torres
- Rusty Torres
- Clay Touchstone
- Touki Toussaint
- Babe Towne
- Sean Tracey
- Chris Tremie
- Mike Tresh
- Ramón Troncoso
- Hal Trosky (Jr.)
- Hal Trosky (Sr.)
- Steve Trout
- Virgil Trucks
- Thurman Tucker
- Jerry Turner
- Tom Turner
- Cy Twombly

== U ==
- Frenchy Uhalt
- Bob Uhl
- Charlie Uhlir
- Cecil Upshaw
- José Ureña
- Juan Uribe

== V ==
- Mario Valdéz
- Wilson Valdéz
- José Valentín
- Vito Valentinetti
- Joe Vance
- Miguel Vargas
- Gus Varland
- Pete Varney
- Mike Vasil
- Andrew Vaughn
- Javier Vázquez
- Donnie Veal
- Vince Velasquez
- Pat Veltman
- Robin Ventura*
- John Verhoeven
- Dayán Viciedo
- Thyago Vieira
- Ken Vining
- Rube Vinson
- Luis Vizcaíno
- Omar Vizquel
- Chris Volstad
- Fritz Von Kolnitz
- Bill Voss
- Pete Vuckovich

== W ==
- Jake Wade
- Leon Wagner
- Don Wakamatsu
- Dixie Walker
- Gee Walker
- Greg Walker
- Kevin Walker
- Jack Wallaesa
- Ed Walsh*
- Ed Walsh Jr.
- Steve Wapnick
- Aaron Ward
- Bryan Ward
- Pete Ward
- Claudell Washington
- George Washington
- Ehren Wassermann
- Johnny Watwood
- Bob Way
- Art Weaver
- Buck Weaver
- Floyd Weaver
- Daniel Webb
- Earl Webb
- Skeeter Webb
- Biggs Wehde
- Dave Wehrmeister
- Ralph Weigel
- Bob Weiland
- Ed Weiland
- Al Weis
- Mike Welday
- Casper Wells
- David Wells
- Kip Wells
- Leo Wells
- Sam West
- Don Wheeler
- Wes Whisler
- Doc White
- Ed White
- Owen White
- Rick White
- John Whitehead
- Frank Whitman
- Chris Widger
- Al Widmar
- Jack Wieneke
- Bill Wight
- Randy Wiles
- Hoyt Wilhelm
- Andy Wilkins
- Roy Wilkinson
- Jerry Willard
- Eddie Williams
- Kenny Williams
- Lefty Williams
- Nick Williams
- Randy Williams
- Walt Williams
- Al Williamson
- Hugh Willingham
- Carl Willis
- Jim Willoughby
- Ted Wills
- Kid Willson
- Bill Wilson
- Bryse Wilson
- Craig Wilson
- George Wilson
- Jim Wilson
- Red Wilson
- Roy Wilson
- Steven Wilson
- Jim Winn
- Kettle Wirts
- Archie Wise
- DeWayne Wise
- Polly Wolfe
- Mellie Wolfgang
- Wilbur Wood
- Mike Woodard
- Frank Woodward
- Jake Woodford
- Gage Workman
- Rich Wortham
- Al Worthington
- Cy Wright
- Dan Wright
- Glenn Wright
- Mike Wright
- Taffy Wright
- Tom Wright
- Rick Wrona
- Kelly Wunsch
- Whit Wyatt
- Early Wynn
- Billy Wynne

== Y ==
- Hugh Yancy
- George Yankowski
- Yam Yaryan
- Michael Ynoa
- Rudy York
- Kevin Youkilis
- Irv Young

== Z ==
- Dom Zanni
- Al Zarilla
- Seby Zavala
- Rollie Zeider
- Gus Zernial
- Richie Zisk
- Bob Zupcic
- Dutch Zwilling
