= 1922 Chicago White Sox season =

1922 Chicago White Sox
- League: American League
- Ballpark: Comiskey Park
- City: Chicago, Illinois
- Record: 77–77 (.500)
- League place: 5th
- Owners: Charles Comiskey
- Managers: Kid Gleason

The 1922 Chicago White Sox season was a season in Major League Baseball. The team finished with a 77–77 record, excluding a tied game that was not included in the standings. They finished sixth in the American League, 17 games behind the pennant-winning New York Yankees. The White Sox scored 691 runs and allowed 691 runs for a run differential of zero, becoming the first team to finish with a .500 winning percentage and a zero run differential. This dubious feat was later matched by the 1983 San Diego Padres.

== Regular season ==
=== Season standings ===
American League
Team	W	L	Pct.	GB	Home	Road
New York Yankees	94	60	.610	—	50‍–‍27	44‍–‍33
St. Louis Browns	93	61	.604	1	54‍–‍23	39‍–‍38
Detroit Tigers	79	75	.513	15	43‍–‍34	36‍–‍41
Cleveland Indians	78	76	.506	16	44‍–‍35	34‍–‍41
Chicago White Sox	77	77	.500	17	43‍–‍34	34‍–‍43
Washington Senators	69	85	.448	25	40‍–‍39	29‍–‍46
Philadelphia Athletics	65	89	.422	29	38‍–‍39	27‍–‍50
Boston Red Sox	61	93	.396	33	31‍–‍42	30‍–‍51

=== Record vs. opponents ===
1922 American League record Sources:
Team	BOS	CWS	CLE	DET	NYY	PHA	SLB	WSH
Boston	—	10–12	6–16	5–17	13–9	10–12	7–15	10–12
Chicago	12–10	—	12–10–1	17–5	9–13	12–10	8–14	7–15
Cleveland	16–6	10–12–1	—	15–7	7–15	11–11	6–16	13–9
Detroit	17–5	5–17	7–15	—	11–11	16–6–1	9–13	14–8
New York	9–13	13–9	15–7	11–11	—	17–5	14–8	15–7
Philadelphia	12–10	10–12	11–11	6–16–1	5–17	—	9–13	12–10
St. Louis	15–7	14–8	16–6	13–9	8–14	13–9	—	14–8
Washington	12–10	15–7	9–13	8–14	7–15	10–12	8–14	—

=== Roster ===
1922 Chicago White Sox
Roster
Pitchers: José Acosta; Homer Blankenship; Emmett Bowles; Harry Courtney; Ernie Cox; Lum Davenport; Cecil Duff; Red Faber; Shovel Hodge; Dixie Leverett; Frank Mack; Dick McCabe; Doug McWeeny; Charlie Robertson; John Russell; Ferdie Schupp; Roy Wilkinson	Catchers: Roy Graham; Jimmie Long; Ray Schalk; Yam Yaryan; Infielders: Eddie Collins; Johnny Evers; John Jenkins; Ernie Johnson; Hervey McClellan; Eddie Mulligan; Earl Sheely	Outfielders: Harry Hooper; Johnny Mostil; Elmer Pence; Bibb Falk; Amos Strunk; Other batters: Hal Bubser; Augie Swentor	Manager: Kid Gleason; Coaches: Johnny Evers

== Player stats ==
=== Batting ===
==== Starters by position ====
Note: Pos = Position; G = Games played; AB = At bats; H = Hits; Avg. = Batting average; HR = Home runs; RBI = Runs batted in

Pos	Player	G	AB	H	Avg.	HR	RBI
C	Ray Schalk	142	442	124	.281	4	60
1B	Earl Sheely	149	526	167	.317	6	80
2B	Eddie Collins	154	598	194	.324	1	69
SS	Ernie Johnson	144	603	153	.254	0	56
3B	Eddie Mulligan	103	372	87	.234	0	31
OF	Johnny Mostil	132	458	139	.303	7	70
OF	Harry Hooper	152	602	183	.304	11	80
OF	Bibb Falk	131	483	144	.298	12	79

==== Other batters ====
Note: G = Games played; AB = At bats; H = Hits; Avg. = Batting average; HR = Home runs; RBI = Runs batted in

Player	G	AB	H	Avg.	HR	RBI
Amos Strunk	92	311	90	.289	0	33
Hervey McClellan	91	301	68	.226	2	28
Yam Yaryan	36	71	14	.197	2	9
Roy Graham	5	3	0	.000	0	0
Johnny Evers	1	3	0	.000	0	1
John Jenkins	5	3	0	.000	0	1
Jimmie Long	3	3	0	.000	0	1
Hal Bubser	3	3	0	.000	0	0
Augie Swentor	1	1	0	.000	0	0
Elmer Pence	1	0	0	----	0	0

=== Pitching ===
==== Starting pitchers ====
Note: G = Games pitched; IP = Innings pitched; W = Wins; L = Losses; ERA = Earned run average; SO = Strikeouts

Player	G	IP	W	L	ERA	SO
Red Faber	43	352.0	21	17	2.81	148
Charlie Robertson	37	272.0	14	15	3.64	83
Dixie Leverett	33	223.2	13	10	3.34	60

==== Other pitchers ====
Note: G = Games pitched; IP = Innings pitched; W = Wins; L = Losses; ERA = Earned run average; SO = Strikeouts

Player	G	IP	W	L	ERA	SO
Shovel Hodge	35	139.0	7	6	4.14	37
Ted Blankenship	24	127.2	8	10	3.81	42
Harry Courtney	18	86.2	5	6	4.98	28
Ferdie Schupp	18	74.0	4	4	6.08	38
Frank Mack	8	34.1	2	2	3.67	11
José Acosta	5	15.0	0	2	8.40	6
Roy Wilkinson	4	14.1	0	1	8.79	3
Cecil Duff	3	12.2	1	1	4.97	7
Doug McWeeny	4	10.2	0	1	5.91	5
John Russell	4	6.2	0	1	6.75	3

==== Relief pitchers ====
Note: G = Games pitched; W = Wins; L = Losses; SV = Saves; ERA = Earned run average; SO = Strikeouts

Player	G	W	L	SV	ERA	SO
Lum Davenport	9	1	1	0	10.80	9
Homer Blankenship	4	0	0	0	4.85	3
Dick McCabe	3	1	0	0	5.40	1
Emmett Bowles	1	0	0	0	27.00	0
Ernie Cox	1	0	0	0	18.00	0
