= 1923 Chicago White Sox season =

1923 Chicago White Sox
- League: American League
- Ballpark: Comiskey Park
- City: Chicago
- Record: 69–85 (.448)
- League place: 7th
- Owners: Charles Comiskey
- Managers: Kid Gleason

The 1923 Chicago White Sox season was a season in Major League Baseball. The White Sox finished seventh in the American League with a record of 69 wins and 85 losses.

It was notably marked by labor controversy in relation to Kenesaw Mountain Landis a judicial federal judge and Commissioner of Baseball, who made a decision which cut building trade wages in Chicago by 12.5%. In response unions called for a labor boycott of the White Sox and Chicago Cubs.

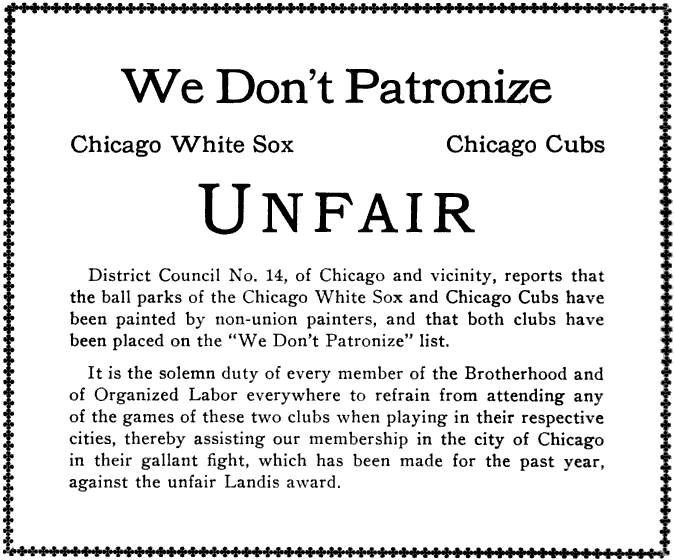
Public notice published in April 1923 urging a labor boycott of the Chicago White Sox and Chicago Cubs, and opposing the Landis building trades award

== Regular season ==
=== Season standings ===
American League
Team	W	L	Pct.	GB	Home	Road
New York Yankees	98	54	.645	—	46‍–‍30	52‍–‍24
Detroit Tigers	83	71	.539	16	45‍–‍32	38‍–‍39
Cleveland Indians	82	71	.536	16½	42‍–‍36	40‍–‍35
Washington Senators	75	78	.490	23½	43‍–‍34	32‍–‍44
St. Louis Browns	74	78	.487	24	40‍–‍36	34‍–‍42
Philadelphia Athletics	69	83	.454	29	34‍–‍41	35‍–‍42
Chicago White Sox	69	85	.448	30	30‍–‍45	39‍–‍40
Boston Red Sox	61	91	.401	37	37‍–‍40	24‍–‍51

=== Record vs. opponents ===
1923 American League record Sources:
Team	BOS	CWS	CLE	DET	NYY	PHA	SLB	WSH
Boston	—	9–13	10–12	10–12–1	8–14	13–7	4–18–1	7–15
Chicago	13–9	—	9–13	9–13	7–15	10–12	11–11–1	10–12–1
Cleveland	12–10	13–9	—	9–13	12–10	12–10	14–8	10–11
Detroit	12–10–1	13–9	13–9	—	10–12	12–10	12–10	11–11
New York	14–8	15–7	10–12	12–10	—	16–6	15–5	16–6
Philadelphia	7–13	12–10	10–12	10–12	6–16	—	9–13	15–7–1
St. Louis	18–4–1	11–11–1	8–14	10–12	5–15	13–9	—	9–13
Washington	15–7	12–10–1	11–10	11–11	6–16	7–15–1	13–9	—

=== Notable transactions ===
- May 12, 1923: Sloppy Thurston was purchased by the White Sox from the St. Louis Browns.
- May 31, 1923: Ernie Johnson was selected off waivers from the White Sox by the New York Yankees.

=== Roster ===
1923 Chicago White Sox
Roster
Pitchers: Homer Blankenship; Ted Blankenship; Leon Cadore; Paul Castner; Sarge Connally; Mike Cvengros; Lum Davenport; Slim Embrey; Red Faber; Claral Gillenwater; Dixie Leverett; Ted Lyons; Frank Mack; Red Proctor; Charlie Robertson; Sloppy Thurston; Frank Woodward	Catchers: Buck Crouse; Charlie Dorman; Roy Graham; Ray Schalk; Infielders: Eddie Collins; John Happenny; Ernie Johnson; Willie Kamm; Hervey McClellan; Lou Rosenberg; Earl Sheely	Outfielders: Maurice Archdeacon; Bill Barrett; Roy Elsh; Bibb Falk; Harry Hooper; Johnny Mostil; Amos Strunk; Other batters: Jess Cortazzo; Roxy Snipes; Leo Taylor	Manager: Kid Gleason; Coaches: Ed Walsh

== Player stats ==
=== Batting ===
==== Starters by position ====
Note: Pos = Position; G = Games played; AB = At bats; H = Hits; Avg. = Batting average; HR = Home runs; RBI = Runs batted in

Pos	Player	G	AB	H	Avg.	HR	RBI
C	Ray Schalk	123	382	87	.228	1	44
1B	Earl Sheely	156	570	169	.296	4	88
2B	Eddie Collins	145	505	182	.360	5	67
SS	Hervey McClellan	141	550	129	.235	1	41
3B	Willie Kamm	149	544	159	.292	6	87
OF	Johnny Mostil	153	546	159	.291	3	64
OF	Harry Hooper	145	576	166	.288	10	65
OF	Bibb Falk	87	274	84	.307	5	38

==== Other batters ====
Note: G = Games played; AB = At bats; H = Hits; Avg. = Batting average; HR = Home runs; RBI = Runs batted in

Player	G	AB	H	Avg.	HR	RBI
Roy Elsh	81	209	52	.249	0	24
Bill Barrett	44	162	44	.272	2	23
Maurice Archdeacon	22	87	35	.402	0	4
John Happenny	32	86	19	.221	0	10
Roy Graham	36	82	16	.195	0	6
Buck Crouse	23	70	18	.257	1	7
Amos Strunk	54	54	17	.315	0	8
Ernie Johnson	12	53	10	.189	0	1
Lou Rosenberg	3	4	1	.250	0	0
Charlie Dorman	1	2	1	.500	0	0
Jess Cortazzo	1	1	0	.000	0	0
Roxy Snipes	1	1	0	.000	0	0
Leo Taylor	1	0	0	----	0	0

=== Pitching ===
==== Starting pitchers ====
Note: G = Games pitched; IP = Innings pitched; W = Wins; L = Losses; ERA = Earned run average; SO = Strikeouts

Player	G	IP	W	L	ERA	SO
Charlie Robertson	38	255.0	13	18	3.81	91
Red Faber	32	232.1	14	11	3.41	91
Leon Cadore	1	2.1	0	1	23.14	3

==== Other pitchers ====
Note: G = Games pitched; IP = Innings pitched; W = Wins; L = Losses; ERA = Earned run average; SO = Strikeouts

Player	G	IP	W	L	ERA	SO
Mike Cvengros	40	214.1	12	13	4.41	86
Ted Blankenship	44	204.2	9	14	4.35	57
Dixie Leverett	38	192.2	10	13	4.06	64
Sloppy Thurston	44	191.2	7	8	3.05	55
Ted Lyons	9	22.2	2	1	6.35	6
Claral Gillenwater	5	21.1	1	3	5.48	2
Frank Woodward	2	2.0	0	1	13.50	0

==== Relief pitchers ====
Note: G = Games pitched; W = Wins; L = Losses; SV = Saves; ERA = Earned run average; SO = Strikeouts

Player	G	W	L	SV	ERA	SO
Frank Mack	11	0	1	0	4.24	6
Paul Castner	6	0	0	0	6.30	0
Homer Blankenship	4	1	1	1	3.60	1
Sarge Connally	3	0	0	0	6.23	3
Lum Davenport	2	0	0	0	6.23	1
Red Proctor	2	0	0	0	13.50	0
Slim Embrey	1	0	0	0	10.13	1
