= Charlie Robertson's perfect game =

Baseball game

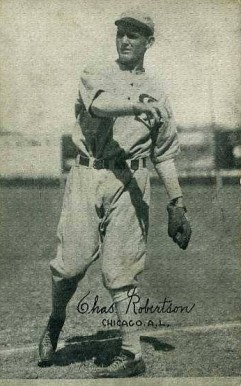
- Charlie Robertson in 1922 with Chicago.
Chicago White Sox	Detroit Tigers
2	0
	1	2	3	4	5	6	7	8	9	R	H	E
Chicago White Sox	0	2	0	0	0	0	0	0	0	2	7	0
Detroit Tigers	0	0	0	0	0	0	0	0	0	0	0	1
- Date: April 30, 1922
- Venue: Navin Field
- City: Detroit, Michigan
- Managers: Kid Gleason (Chicago White Sox); Ty Cobb (Detroit Tigers)
- Umpires: HP: Dick Nallin; 1B: Billy Evans; 2B: (none); 3B: (none)

On April 30, 1922, in a game between the Chicago White Sox and Detroit Tigers, Charlie Robertson pitched the fifth perfect game in Major League Baseball history. Robertson, pitching for the White Sox, retired all 27 batters he faced.

== The game ==
Robertson was the White Sox's starting pitcher for their game against the Tigers in Detroit on Sunday, April 30, 1922. The 26-year-old Robertson, who had played for the American Association's Minneapolis Millers the previous season, was making his fourth start in Major League Baseball. He faced a Detroit team that ended the season with a .306 batting average.

Robertson started off the game by striking out Lu Blue. In the second inning, Chicago's Harry Hooper and Johnny Mostil scored on a Whitey Sheely single for the only runs. A spectacular diving catch by Johnny Mostil on a liner to left by Bobby Veach in the second inning preserved the historic feat. Throughout the game, Tigers manager Ty Cobb complained to the umpires that Robertson was doctoring the ball. Robertson's uniform was checked, and Detroit kept several game balls, but nothing was ever found. In the ninth inning, Robertson retired pinch hitter Johnny Bassler for the final out. The game lasted one hour and 55 minutes.

It was 34 years before anyone else pitched a perfect game in the majors. For White Sox catcher Ray Schalk, it was one of four no-hitters he caught in his career. During the 1922 season, Robertson had a 14–15 win–loss record and a 3.64 earned run average. He finished his career with a win–loss record of 49–80 and a 4.44 ERA, and according to one writer, "Hands down, Robertson is the least-accomplished pitcher to have thrown the most accomplished of games."

He appeared on the game show What's My Line? on October 14, 1956, six days after Don Larsen's perfect game.

== Game statistics ==
April 30, Navin Field

Team	1	2	3	4	5	6	7	8	9	R	H	E
Chicago White Sox	0	2	0	0	0	0	0	0	0	2	7	0
Detroit Tigers	0	0	0	0	0	0	0	0	0	0	0	1
WP: Charlie Robertson (2–0) LP: Herman Pillette (2–1)

=== Box score ===
Hitting
Chicago White Sox	AB	R	H	RBI	Detroit Tigers	AB	R	H	RBI
Eddie Mulligan, SS	4	0	1	0	Lu Blue, 1B	3	0	0	0
Hervey McClellan, 3B	3	0	1	0	George Cutshaw, 2B	3	0	0	0
Eddie Collins, 2B	3	0	1	0	Ty Cobb, CF	3	0	0	0
Harry Hooper, RF	3	1	0	0	Bobby Veach, LF	3	0	0	0
Johnny Mostil, LF	4	1	1	0	Harry Heilmann, RF	3	0	0	0
Amos Strunk, CF	3	0	0	0	Bob Jones, 3B	3	0	0	0
Earl Sheely, 1B	4	0	2	2	Topper Rigney, SS	2	0	0	0
Ray Schalk, C	4	0	1	0	Danny Clark, PH	1	0	0	0
Charlie Robertson, P	4	0	0	0	Clyde Manion, C	3	0	0	0
.	0	0	0	0	Herman Pillette, P	2	0	0	0
.	0	0	0	0	Johnny Bassler, PH	1	0	0	0
Totals	32	2	7	2	Totals	27	0	0	0

Pitching
Chicago White Sox	IP	H	R	ER	BB	SO	Detroit Tigers	IP	H	R	ER	BB	SO
Charlie Robertson	9	0	0	0	0	6	Herman Pillette	9	7	2	2	2	5
Totals	9	0	0	0	0	6	Totals	9	7	2	2	2	5
