= List of athletes from Montana =

Location of Montana

There are no major league sports franchises in the American state of Montana due to the state's relatively small and dispersed population, but a number of minor-league teams play in the state.

Baseball is the minor-league sport with the longest heritage in the state, and Montana is home to four Minor League baseball teams, all members of the Pioneer Baseball League. Many athletes move out of Montana to pursue their professional career in other states.

Football and basketball are the two most popular sports at the high school level. Montana is one of the few states where the smallest high schools participate in six-man football leagues. Numerous other sports are played at the club and amateur level, including softball, rugby, and soccer.

A number of Montanans have become notable for their involvement in a wide range of sport. Dave McNally is a baseball player who was a starting pitcher for the Baltimore Orioles for 13 years. Phil Jackson is a basketball player and head coach who has been voted one of the Top 10 Coaches in National Basketball Association History. Football players and coaches from Montana include Dave Dickenson, Pat Donovan, Jerry Kramer, and Jan Stenerud. Dickenson played quarterback in both the Canadian Football League (CFL) and National Football League (NFL) before becoming a head coach in the CFL for the Calgary Stampeders and BC Lions. Pat Donovan was ranked the top football player and number five overall athlete from Montana in the 20th century. Donovan played left tackle for the Dallas Cowboys, was a four-time Pro Bowler, and played in three Super Bowls, winning one. Jerry Kramer played offensive guard for the Green Bay Packers, was a three-time Pro Bowler, and a five-time All-Pro, and is a member of the Pro Football Hall of Fame. Jan Stenerud is a Norwegian who went to college in Montana on a ski jumping scholarship. He was a placekicker in the American Football League (AFL) and NFL for 19 years, mostly for the Kansas City Chiefs. He was the first soccer-style kicker in the NFL and was elected to the Pro Football Hall of Fame in 1991.

In 1904, a group of young Native-American women from Montana, after playing undefeated during their last season, went to the Louisiana Purchase Exposition held in St. Louis, Missouri, and defeated all challenging teams and were declared to be world champions. For this they received a large silver trophy with the inscription "World's Fair – St. Louis, 1904 – Basket Ball – Won by Fort Shaw Team".

== Baseball ==
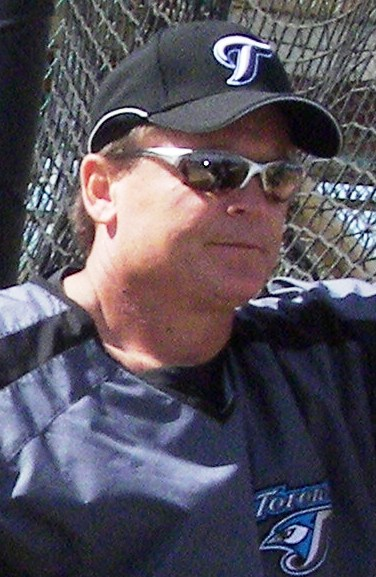
John Gibbons as a manager in 2007

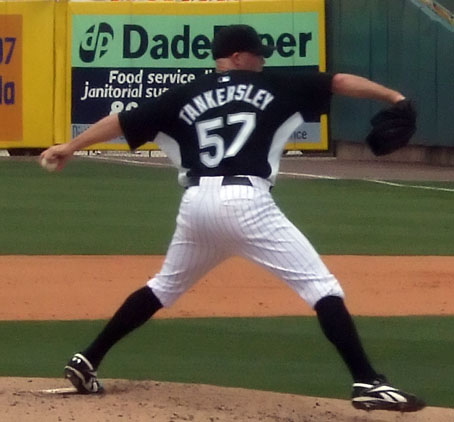
Taylor Tankersley about to throw a pitch in 2008

Baseball players from Montana
Name	Lifetime	Montana connection	Comments	Ref(s)
Jeff Ballard	1963–present	Born and raised in Billings	Major League Baseball pitcher (1987–1994)	
Ed Bouchee	1933–2013	Born and raised in Livingston	Major League Baseball first baseman (1955–1962)	
Scott Brow	1969–present	Born in Butte	Major League Baseball relief pitcher (1993–1998)	
Johnny Couch	1891–1975	Born in Vaughn	Major League Baseball pitcher (1917–1925)	
Jeff Doyle	1956–present	Born in Havre	Major League Baseball second baseman (1983)	
Cecil Duff	1896–1969	Born in Radersburg	Major League Baseball pitcher (1922)	
John Gibbons	1962–present	Born in Great Falls	Major League Baseball catcher (1984, 1986); manager (2004–2008)	
Vedie Himsl	1917–2004	Born in Plevna	Minor league baseball pitcher (1938–1942, 1946, 1950–1951); Major League Baseball coach (1960–1964) and scout (1965–1985)	
Rob Johnson	1982–present	Born in Anaconda	Major League Baseball catcher (2007–present)	
John Leister	1961–present	Attended high school in Great Falls	Major League Baseball pitcher (1987, 1990)	
John Lowenstein	1947–present	Born in Wolf Point	Major League Baseball outfielder, designated hitter, and utilityman (1970–1985)	
Joe McIntosh	1951–present	Born in Billings	Major League Baseball starting pitcher (1974–1975)	
Dave McNally	1942–2002	Born and lived in Billings	Major League Baseball starting pitcher (1962–1975)	
Dave Meier	1959–present	Born in Helena	Major League Baseball left fielder (1984–1988)	
Gary Neibauer	1944–present	Born in Billings	Major League Baseball relief pitcher (1969–1973)	
Jim Otten	1951–present	Born in Lewistown	Major League Baseball pitcher (1974–1981)	
Herb Plews	1928–2014	Born in Helena	Major League Baseball infielder (1956–1959)	
Les Rohr	1946–2020	Moved to Montana when an infant, attended high school in and lives in Billings	Major League Baseball pitcher (1967–1969)	
Curt Schmidt	1970–present	Born in Miles City	Major League Baseball relief pitcher (1995)	
Taylor Tankersley	1983–present	Born in Missoula	Major League Baseball relief pitcher (2006–present)	
Mason Tobin	1987–present	Born in Glendive	Major League Baseball relief pitcher (2011–present)	
Jim Tyack	1911–1995	Born in Florence	Major League Baseball outfielder (1943)	
Rees Gephardt "Steamboat" Williams	1892–1979	Born in Cascade	Major League Baseball pitcher (1914–1916)	

== Basketball ==
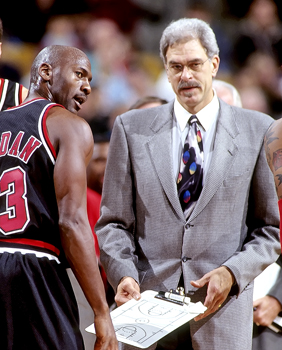
11-time NBA champion coach Phil Jackson with Michael Jordan in 1997

Basketball players from Montana
Name	Lifetime	Montana connection	Comments	Ref(s)
Cass Bauer-Bilodeau	1972–present	Born and raised in Hysham; attended college in Bozeman	Women's National Basketball Association small forward (1999–2002)	
Jim Creighton	1950–present	Born in Billings	National Basketball Association small forward (1976)	
Denise Curry	1959–present	Born in Fort Benton	Olympic gold medalist (1984); professional basketball player in France with Ligue Féminine de Basketball, winning two national championships (1986, 1987)	
Brad Holland	1956–present	Born in Billings	National Basketball Association shooting guard (1980–1982)	
Phil Jackson	1945–present	Born and lived for several years in Deer Lodge	National Basketball Association (NBA) power forward (1968–1980) and head coach (1990–2011); voted one of the Top 10 coaches in NBA history	
Ed Kalafat	1932–2019	Attended high school in Anaconda	National Basketball Association center (1955–1957)	
Larry Krystkowiak	1964–present	Born in Missoula; raised in Shelby; finished high school in Missoula	National Basketball Association power forward (1986–1996) and head coach (2007–2008)	
Mike Lewis	1946–present	Born in Missoula	American Basketball Association center (1969–1974)	
Adam Morrison	1984–present	Born in Glendive	National Basketball Association small forward (2006–2010)	
Robin Selvig	1953–present	Born in Outlook	Coach of University of Montana women's team (1978–2016); ranked 8th in winning percentage among coaches of college women's basketball teams	
Keith Tower	1970–present	Born in Libby	National Basketball Association center (1994–1997)	

== Boxing ==
Boxers from Montana
Name	Lifetime	Montana connection	Comments	Ref(s)
Marvin Camel	1951–present	Born in Ronan; lived in Missoula	World Boxing Council and International Boxing Federation cruiserweight champion (1980–1981)	
Joe Hipp	1962–present	Born in Browning	First Native American heavyweight champion (1999)	
Todd Foster	1967–present	Born in Great Falls	Golden Gloves light welterweight national champion (1987); Olympics competitor (1988); professional boxer	

== Gridiron football ==
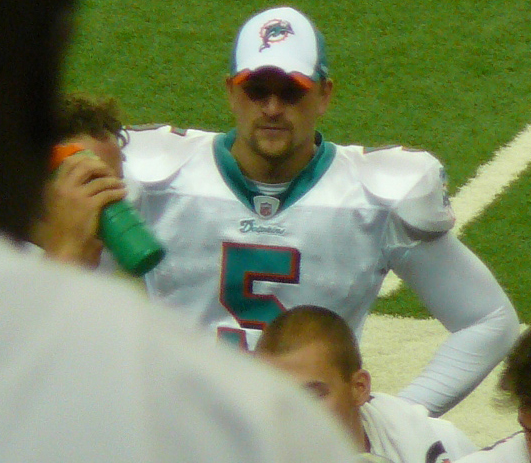
Dan Carpenter on the sidelines in 2009

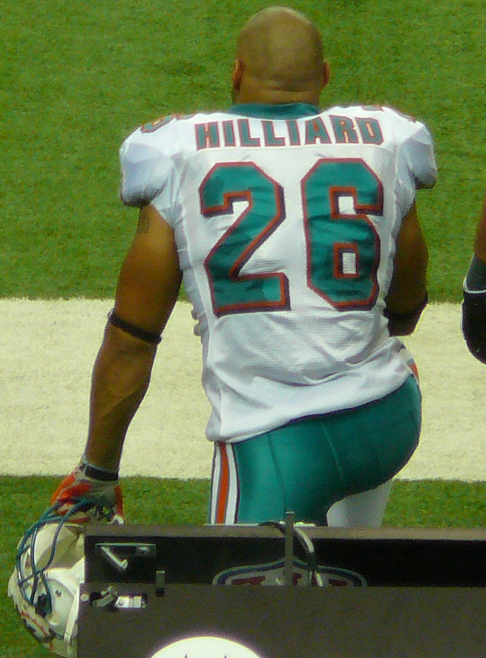
Lex Hilliard with the Miami Dolphins in 2009

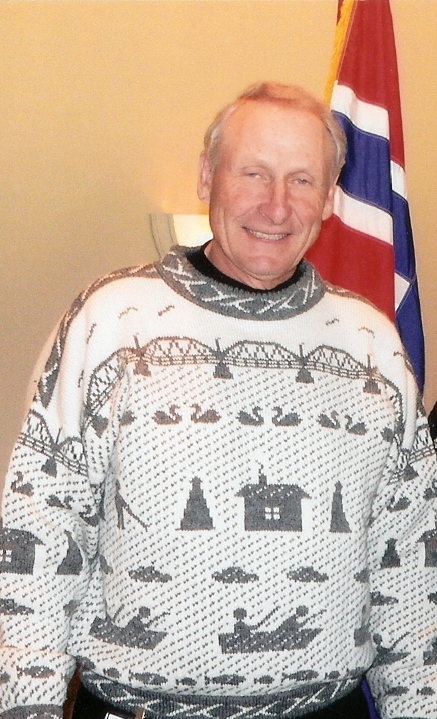
Jan Stenerud in 2008 in front of Norwegian flag

Gridiron football players and coaches from Montana
Name	Lifetime	Montana connection	Comments	Ref(s)
Colt Anderson	1985–present	Born and raised in Butte; attended college in Missoula	National Football League free safety (2009–present)	
Kroy Biermann	1985–present	Born in Hardin; attended college in Missoula	National Football League defensive end (2008–present)	
Dan Carpenter	1985–present	Attended high school in Helena; attended college in Missoula	National Football League placekicker (2008–present)	
Shane Collins	1969–present	Born in Roundup; attended high school in Bozeman	National Collegiate Athletic Association shot put national champion (1990); National Football League defensive end (1992–1994)	
Scott Curry	1975–present	Born in Conrad; attended high school in Valier; attended college in Missoula	National Football League offensive tackle (1999–2000)	
Barry Darrow	1950–present	Attended high school in Great Falls; attended college in Missoula	National Football League offensive tackle (1974–1978)	
Dave Dickenson	1973–present	Born, raised, and attended high school in Great Falls; attended college in Missoula	Canadian Football League (CFL) and National Football League quarterback (1997–2008); CFL head coach (2008–present)	
Mitch Donahue	1968–present	Attended high school in Billings	National Football League defensive end/linebacker (1991–1994)	
Pat Donovan	1953–present	Attended high school in Helena	National Football League left tackle (1975–1983); four-time Pro Bowler; played in three Super Bowls, winning one	
Travis Dorsch	1979–present	Attended high school in Bozeman	National Football League placekicker and punter (2002–2004)	
Dwan Edwards	1981–present	Born in Billings; attended high school in Columbus	National Football League defensive tackle (2004–present)	
Casey FitzSimmons	1980–present	Born in Wolf Point; raised in Chester; attended college in Helena	National Football League tight end (2003–2009)	
Dane Fletcher	1986–present	Born in and attended both high school and college in Bozeman	National Football League linebacker (2010–present)	
John Friesz	1967–present	Born in Missoula	National Football League quarterback (1990–2000); member of College Football Hall of Fame	
Tim Hauck	1966–present	Born in Butte; raised in Big Timber; resides in Missoula	National Football League defensive back (1990–2002)	
Kris Heppner	1977–present	Born in Great Falls; attended college in Missoula	National Football League placekicker (2000)	
Lex Hilliard	1984–present	Born and attended high school in Kalispell; attended college in Missoula	National Football League running back (2008–present)	
"Wild" Bill Kelly	1905–1931	Raised in and attended college in Missoula	National Football League running back (2008–present); member of College Football Hall of Fame	
Steve Kragthorpe	1965–present	Born in Missoula	Head coach at University of Tulsa (2003–2006) and University of Louisville (2007–2009)	
Jerry Kramer	1936–present	Born in Jordan	National Football League offensive guard (1958–1968); three-time Pro Bowler; five-time All-Pro; ranked number one player not in the Hall of Fame by the NFL Network	
Milan Lazetich	1921–1969	Born in Anaconda; attended college in Missoula	National Football League offensive guard (1945–1950)	
Ryan Leaf	1976–present	Born and raised in Great Falls	National Football League quarterback (1998–2002)	
Marc Mariani	1987–present	Born and raised in Havre; attended college in Missoula	National Football League wide receiver (2010–present)	
Jack McAuliffe	1901–1941	Born and raised in Butte; attended college in Missoula	National Football League running back (1926)	
Sam McCullum	1952–present	Raised in Kalispell; attended college in Bozeman	National Football League wide receiver (1974–1983)	
Blaine McElmurry	1973–present	Born in Helena; raised in Troy; attended college in Missoula	National Football League defensive back (1997–1999)	
Dylan McFarland	1980–present	Born in Kalispell; attended college in Missoula	National Football League offensive tackle (2004–2006)	
Mike McLeod	1958–present	Born, raised, and attended college in Bozeman	National Football League safety (1984–1985)	
Dallas Neil	1976–present	Born in Great Falls; attended college in Missoula	National Football League punter and tight end (2000–2004)	
Bob O'Billovich	1940–present	Attended high school in Butte; attended college in Missoula	Canadian Football League (CFL) defensive back and quarterback (1963–1967); CFL head coach and front-office official (1982–1989, 1990–1995, 2008–present)	
Brock Osweiler	1990–present	Raised and attended high school in Kalispell	National Football League quarterback (2012–present)	
Mike Person	1988–present	Born in Glendive; attended college in Bozeman	National Football League center (2011–present)	
Russ Peterson	1905–1971	Attended high school in Miles City; attended college in Missoula	National Football League offensive tackle (1932)	
Bobby Petrino	1961–present	Born in Lewistown; raised and attended college in Helena	National Football League head coach (Atlanta Falcons, 2007); collegiate head coach at the University of Louisville (2003–2006, 2014–present), University of Arkansas (2008–2011) and Western Kentucky University (2013)	
Paul Petrino	1967–present	Born in Butte; raised and attended college in Helena	Collegiate head coach at the University of Idaho (2013–present)	
Milt "Butte Bullet" Popovich	1915–2005	Born in Butte	National Football League fullback (1938–1942)	
Brian Salonen	1961–present	Born in Glasgow; raised in Great Falls; attended college in Missoula	National Football League tight end and linebacker (1984–1985)	
Shann Schillinger	1986–present	Born and raised in Baker; attended college in Missoula	National Football League free safety (2010–present)	
Kirk Scrafford	1967–present	Born and raised in Billings; attended college in Missoula	National Football League offensive tackle (1990–1998)	
Jan Stenerud	1942–present	Moved to Bozeman from Norway to attend college on a ski jumping scholarship	American Football League and National Football League placekicker (1967–1985); elected to Pro Football Hall of Fame (1991); recruited to the Montana State University – Bozeman (MSU) football team by Jim Sweeney	
Jim Sweeney	1929–2013	Born in Butte; coached college football in Bozeman	Head football coach at Montana State University – Bozeman (MSU) (1963–1967), Washington State University (1968–1975), and California State University, Fresno (1976–1977, 1980–1996), compiling a career college football record of 201-153-4; credited with recruiting Jan Stenerud to the MSU team	
Kevin Sweeney	1963–present	Born in Bozeman	National Football League quarterback (1987–1988)	
Mike Tilleman	1944–2020	Born in Chinook; attended college in Missoula; lives in Havre	National Football League defensive tackle (1966–1976)	
Corey Widmer	1968–present	Raised and attended college in Bozeman	National Football League linebacker and defensive lineman (1992–1999)	

== Rodeo ==
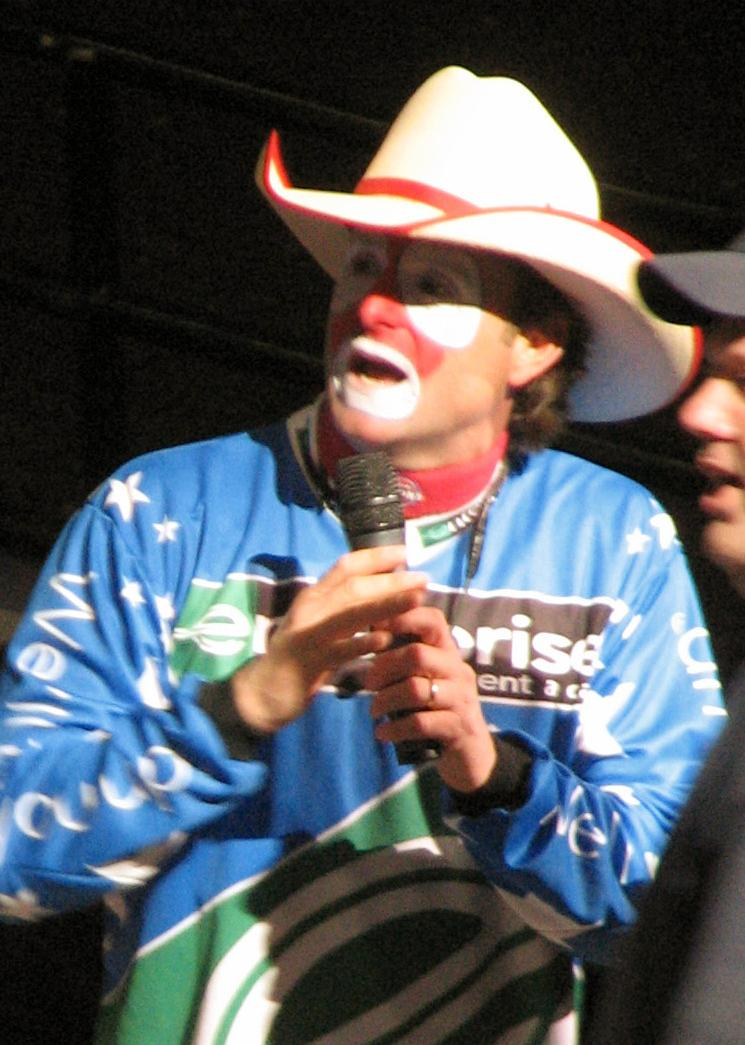
Rodeo clown Flint Rasmussen in 2007

Rodeo performers from Montana
Name	Lifetime	Montana connection	Comments	Ref(s)
Bill Linderman	1920–1965	Born in Bridger; raised in Red Lodge	Professional Rodeo Cowboys Association world champion All-Around Cowboy (1950 & 1953); elected to ProRodeo Hall of Fame (1979)	
Montie Montana	1910–1998	Born in Wolf Point	Trick roper and rider; actor; stuntman; participant in Tournament of Roses Parade for 60 years; elected to ProRodeo Hall of Fame (1994);	
Dan Mortensen	1968–present	Born in Billings; attended college in Bozeman; lives in Manhattan	Professional Rodeo Cowboys Association world champion All-Around Cowboy (1997); World Saddle Bronc Champion (1993–1995, 1997, 1998 and 2003); elected to ProRodeo Hall of Fame (2009)	
Alice Greenough Orr	1902–1995	Born, raised, and lived in Red Lodge	Member of National Cowgirl Museum and Hall of Fame and National Cowboy & Western Heritage Museum	
Flint Rasmussen	1968–present	Born in Montana; lives on a ranch near Choteau	Rodeo clown; Professional Rodeo Cowboys Association "Clown of the Year" eight consecutive years; former high school science and math teacher	
Benny Reynolds	1936–2014	Born and raised in Twin Bridges; lived in Melrose	Professional Rodeo Cowboys Association world champion All-Around Cowboy (1961); elected to the ProRodeo Hall of Fame in 1993.	

== Wrestling ==
Wrestlers from Montana
Name	Lifetime	Montana connection	Comments	Ref(s)
Bill Zadick	1973–present	Born and raised in Great Falls	World Freestyle Championships gold medalist at 66 kilograms (146 lb) (2006)	
Mike Zadick	1978–present	Born and raised in Great Falls	World Freestyle Championships silver medalist at 60 kilograms (130 lb) (2006)	

== Other athletes ==
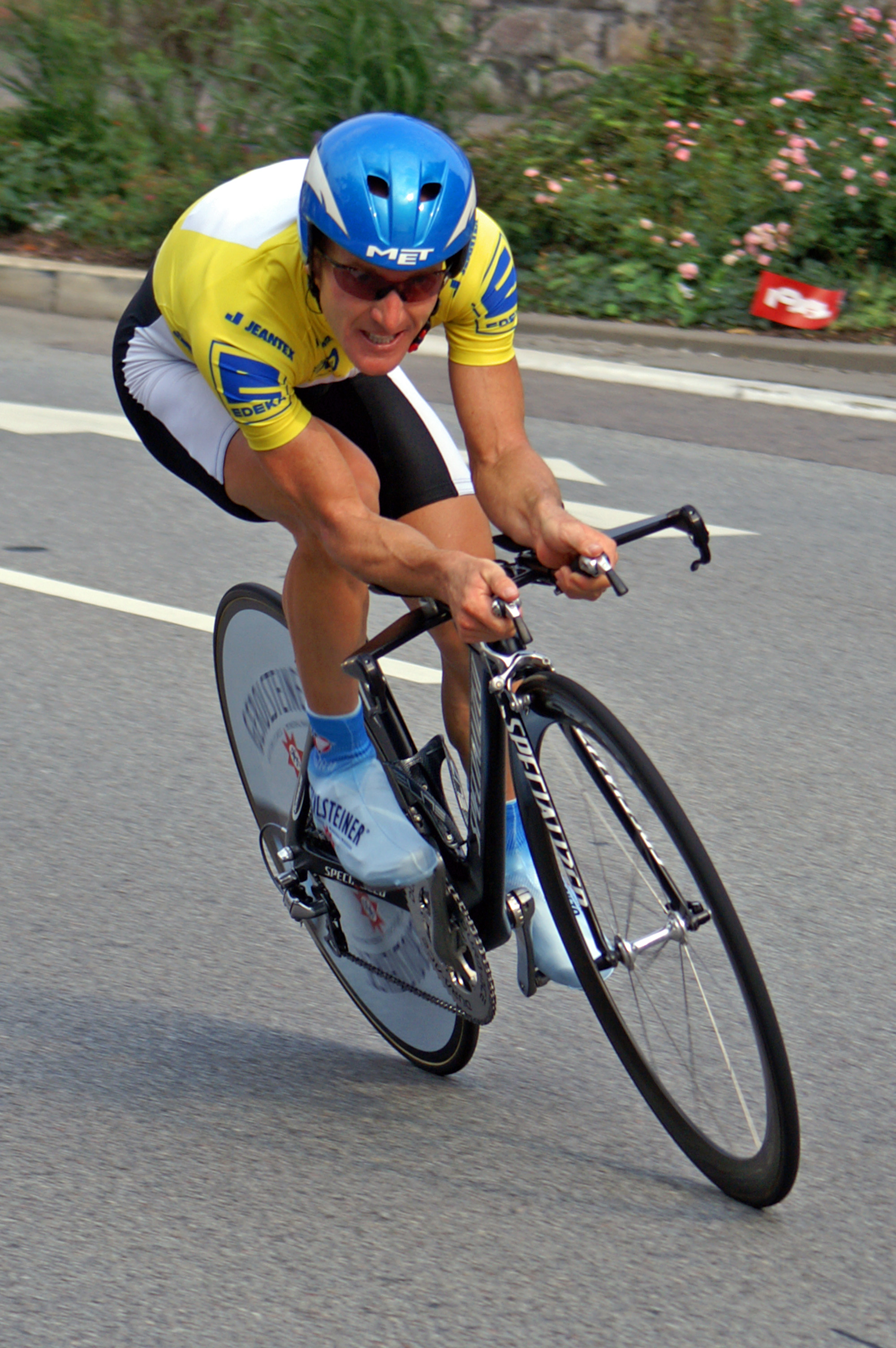
Cyclist Levi Leipheimer, Germany 2005

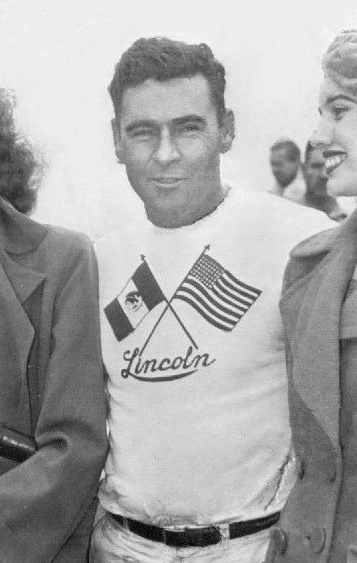
Indy car driver Chuck Stevenson in 1952

Other athletes from Montana
Name	Lifetime	Montana connection	Comments	Ref(s)
Conrad Anker	1963–present	Lives in Bozeman	Mountain climber; member of The North Face climbing team	
Eric Bergoust	1969–present	Born and raised in Missoula	Olympic freestyle skier (1994, 1998, 2002, 2006); gold medalist (1998)	
Scott Davis	1972–present	Born in Great Falls	Figure skater; two-time U.S. Champion (1993–1994)	
Keith Jardine	1975–present	Born in Butte	Mixed martial arts fighter	
Dave Johnson	1963–present	Raised in Missoula	Decathlete; participant in 1988 Summer Olympics; bronze medalist in 1992 Summer Olympics	
Nikki Kimball	1971–present	Lives in Bozeman	Ultra-distance runner; 50 miles (80 km) Trail National Champion (2003, 2004, 2005)	
Levi Leipheimer	1973–present	Born in Butte	Cyclist; bronze medal at 2008 Beijing Summer Olympics in the individual road time trial	
John Misha Petkevich	1949–present	Raised in Great Falls	Olympic figure skater (1968 Winter Olympics, 1972 Winter Olympics); United States Figure Skating Champion and North American Figure Skating Champion in men's singles (1971); earned a Ph.D. in cell biology at University of Oxford as a Rhodes scholar	
Mike Ramos	1962–present	Lives in Missoula	National Collegiate Athletic Association (NCAA) decathlon champion (1986); won three Pac-10 decathlon titles (1983, 1984, 1986); set NCAA decathlon record (8,322 points) in 1986 Pac-10 championship meet; inducted to the Husky Hall of Fame (2000)	
Alice Ritzman	1952–present	Born and raised in Flathead Valley; attended college in Billings	Professional golfer on the Ladies Professional Golf Association (LPGA) Tour (1978–1998)	
Jake Sanderson	2002-present	Born in Whitefish	Professional Ice Hockey player for the Ottawa Senators of the National Hockey League.	
Scot Schmidt	1961–present	Born in Helena	First professional extreme skier	
Leslie Spalding	1969–present	Born in Billings; previously lived in Billings and Bozeman	Professional golfer on the Ladies Professional Golf Association (LPGA) Tour (1995–2005); head coach of women's golf at Montana State University (2007–2011)	
Chuck Stevenson	1919–1995	Born in Sidney.	IndyCar driver; winner of the 1952 National Championship.	
Doug Swingley	1953–present	Born and raised in Great Falls; lives in Lincoln	Dog sled racer; four-time winner of the Iditarod Trail Sled Dog Race (1995, 1999, 2000, 2001)	
Lones Wigger	1937–2017	Born in Great Falls	Rifle shooter; three-time Olympic medalist—gold and silver in the 1964 Summer Olympics and gold in the 1972 Summer Olympics; once held 80 national championships and 29 world records	

== See also ==
- List of people from Montana
- Lists of sportspeople
