= Roy Graham =

Roy Graham may refer to:

- Roy Graham (baseball)(1895–1933), American Major League Baseball player
- Roy Theodore Graham (1887–1965), Liberal party member of the Canadian House of Commons
- Roy Graham (fencer), American fencer

== See also ==
- Rory Graham (born 1985), English singer and songwriter, known professionally as Rag'n'Bone Man
