= Bruce Tanner =

American baseball player and coach (born 1961)

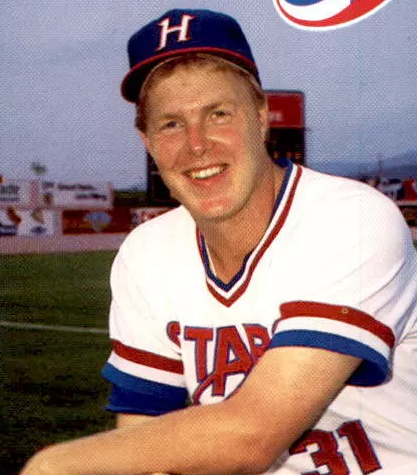
- Tanner with the Huntsville Stars c. 1988
- Pitcher
- Born: December 9, 1961 (age 64); New Castle, Pennsylvania, U.S.
- Batted: Left Threw: Right

MLB debut
- June 12, 1985, for the Chicago White Sox

Last MLB appearance
- September 28, 1985, for the Chicago White Sox

MLB statistics
- Win–loss record: 1–2
- Earned run average: 5.33
- Innings pitched: 27
- Stats at Baseball Reference

Teams
- Chicago White Sox (1985)

Bruce Matthew Tanner (born December 9, 1961) is an American former professional baseball player, coach and current scout. He played as a pitcher in Major League Baseball. As of 2016, he was listed as a Major League scout by the Detroit Tigers, working out of his home city of New Castle. Tanner attended Florida State University; he stood 6 feet 3 inches (1.91 m) tall and weighed 220 pounds (100 kg) during his active career.

He is the son of the late Chuck Tanner, who played all or parts of eight seasons in Major League Baseball (1955–62) and managed in the Majors for 19 seasons (1970–88) for the Chicago White Sox, Oakland Athletics, Pittsburgh Pirates and Atlanta Braves.

== Career ==
=== Playing career ===
Born in New Castle, Pennsylvania, Tanner was selected by the White Sox in the fourth round of the 1983 Major League Baseball draft and was in his third season in the ChiSox farm system when he was recalled from the Triple-A Buffalo Bisons. In his Major League debut on June 12, 1985, he started against the Seattle Mariners at the Kingdome. Going 6 2/3 innings, he allowed only two runs, both earned, on seven hits and two walks and received credit for the 6–3 victory. In his next starting assignment, six days later at Comiskey Park, Tanner allowed only one earned run and four hits in five innings pitched against the Oakland Athletics. He left the game with the White Sox leading, 3–1, but did not receive credit for a decision. His debut start on June 12 would account for his only MLB win.

Tanner was treated roughly in his third start by the California Angels on June 23, a loss in which he was knocked out of the game in the second inning. In his fourth and final start, June 28 against the Minnesota Twins, he turned in a better performance, but was still charged with the defeat in a 5–4 Minnesota victory. His final six big-league games would be as a relief pitcher. In ten MLB games and 27 innings pitched, he allowed 34 hits and 13 walks, with nine strikeouts. He returned to the minor leagues in 1986 and pitched through 1989.

=== Coaching career ===
After retiring as a player, he spent the 1990s as a minor league pitching coach for several teams before becoming the bullpen coach for the Pittsburgh Pirates before the 2001 season, a position he held through the 2005 season. In 2006, he served as Pitching Coach for the Williamsport Crosscutters, one of the Pirates' minor league affiliates. In 2007, he took a job as the Detroit Tigers advance scout. In October 2008, he was promoted to the position of Major League Scout, one of five that are employed by the Detroit Tigers.

== See also ==
- List of second-generation Major League Baseball players
- Chicago White Sox all-time roster
