= Hal Bubser =

American baseball player (1895–1959)

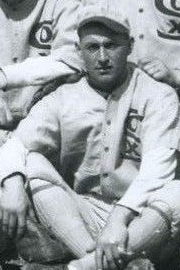
- Born: September 28, 1895; Chicago, Illinois, U.S.
- Died: June 22, 1959 (aged 63); Melrose Park, Illinois, U.S.
- Batted: Right Threw: Right

MLB debut
- April 15, 1922, for the Chicago White Sox

Last MLB appearance
- May 4, 1922, for the Chicago White Sox
- Stats at Baseball Reference

Teams
- Chicago White Sox (1922)

Harold Frederick Bubser (September 28, 1895 – June 22, 1959) was an American Major League Baseball player for the Chicago White Sox. He received three plate appearances for the 1922 Chicago White Sox as a pinch hitter.
