= Bud Sheely =

American baseball player (1920–1985)

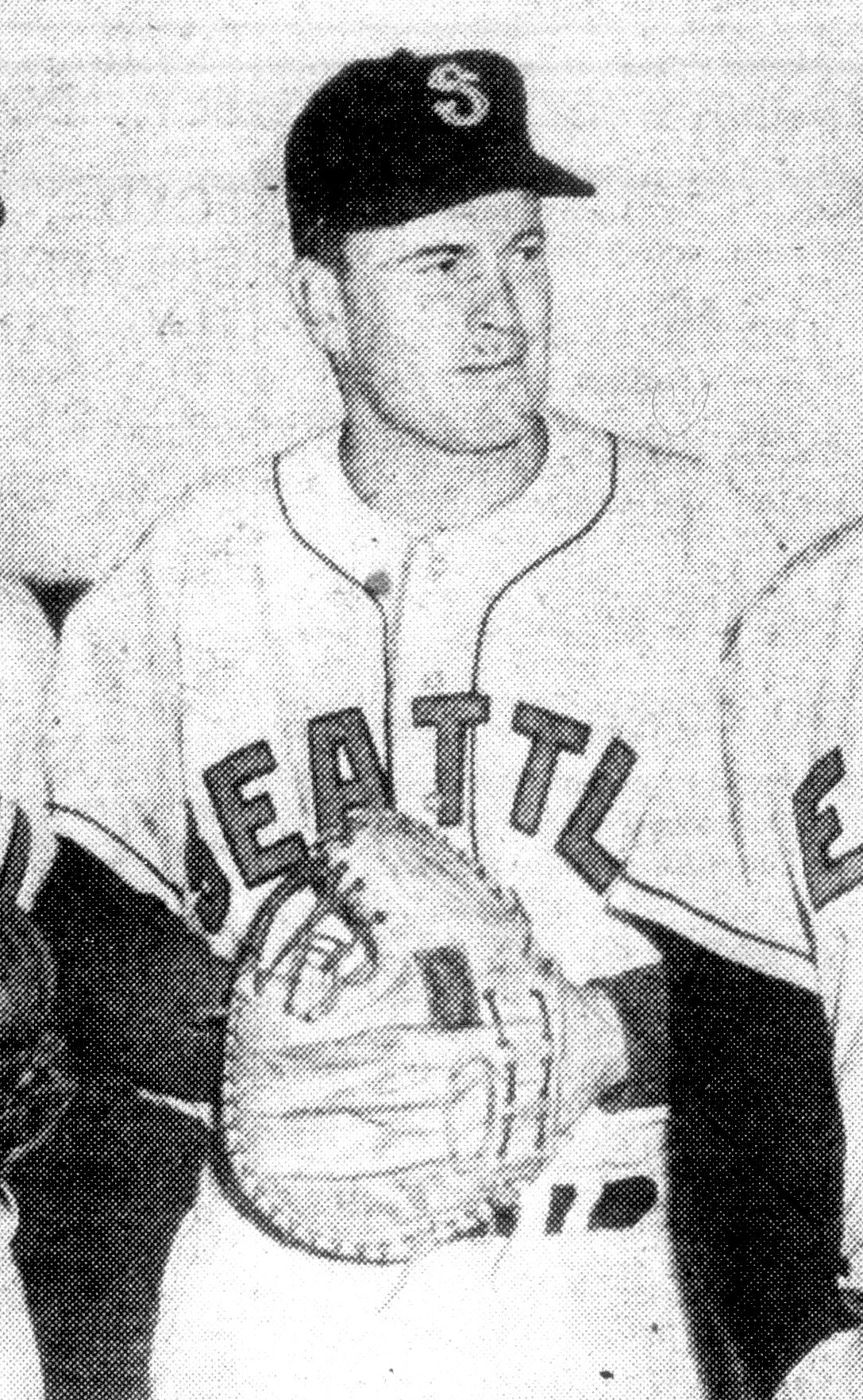
- Sheely in 1950
- Catcher
- Born: November 26, 1920; Spokane, Washington, US
- Died: October 17, 1985 (aged 64); Sacramento, California, US
- Batted: Left Threw: Right

MLB debut
- July 26, 1951, for the Chicago White Sox

Last MLB appearance
- September 13, 1953, for the Chicago White Sox

MLB statistics
- Batting average: .210
- Home runs: 0
- Runs batted in: 12
- Stats at Baseball Reference

Teams
- Chicago White Sox (1951–1953)

Hollis Kimball "Bud" Sheely (November 26, 1920 – October 17, 1985) was an American Major League Baseball catcher. He appeared in 101 games over 21/2 seasons, all for the Chicago White Sox, from July 1951 through 1953. Steely batted left-handed and threw right-handed; he stood 6 feet 1 inch (1.85 m) tall and weighed 200 pounds (91 kg).

The son of Earl Sheely, a first baseman who played in over 1,200 MLB games over nine seasons (1921–27; 1929; 1931), Bud Sheely was born in Spokane, Washington, and attended Saint Mary's College of California. He was signed by the Boston Red Sox as an amateur free agent in 1941.

Before the 1946 season, he was released by the Red Sox and signed as a free agent with the Pittsburgh Pirates. He was returned by Pittsburgh to the Hollywood Stars of the Pacific Coast League prior to 1947, and obtained by the White Sox when Chicago signed a new working agreement with the Stars.

Sheely's 44 MLB hits included 39 singles. Only five went for extra bases, all doubles. His pro career ended after the 1955 season, which he spent in the Pacific Coast League.

== See also ==
- List of second-generation Major League Baseball players
