= Radersburg, Montana =

- Village
- Location of Radersburg, Montana
- Coordinates: 46°11′38″N 111°37′40″W
- Country: United States
- State: Montana
- County: Broadwater

Area
  - Total: 0.25 sq mi (0.65 km^{2})
  - Land: 0.25 sq mi (0.65 km^{2})
  - Water: 0 sq mi (0.00 km^{2})
- Elevation: 4,308 ft (1,313 m)

Population (2020)
  - Total: 61
  - Density: 242.6/sq mi (93.67/km^{2})
- Time zone: UTC-7 (Mountain (MST))
  - Summer (DST): UTC-6 (MDT)
- ZIP code: 59641
- Area code: 406
- FIPS code: 30-60475
- GNIS feature ID: 2409119

Radersburg is a census-designated place (CDP) in Broadwater County, Montana, United States. As of the 2020 census, Radersburg had a population of 61.

== History ==
Radersburg was established in 1865 when gold was discovered there. It is named for Reuben Rader, a Virginian who ranched and prospected in the area.

In 1869 it became the county seat of Jefferson County. The seat of government was lost in 1883 to Boulder.

== Geography ==
Radersburg is located near Canyon Ferry Lake. Swamp Creek runs alongside the town.

According to the United States Census Bureau, the CDP has a total area of 0.27 square miles (0.7 km^{2}), all land.

=== Climate ===
According to the Köppen Climate Classification system, Radersburg has a semi-arid climate, abbreviated "BSk" on climate maps.

=== Off-Highway-Vehicle Area ===
Radersburg is home to a BLM OHV Area. The area offers play pits, hills, and bermed corners for the more experienced rider.

== Demographics ==
Historical population
Census	Pop.	Note	%±
2020	61		—
U.S. Decennial Census

As of the census of 2000, there were 70 people, 39 households, and 20 families residing in the CDP. The population density was 108.5 inhabitants per square mile (41.9/km^{2}). There were 53 housing units at an average density of 82.2 per square mile (31.7/km^{2}). The racial makeup of the CDP was 100.00% White.

There were 39 households, out of which 12.8% had children under the age of 18 living with them, 41.0% were married couples living together, 7.7% had a female householder with no husband present, and 46.2% were non-families. 46.2% of all households were made up of individuals, and 12.8% had someone living alone who was 65 years of age or older. The average household size was 1.79 and the average family size was 2.33.

In the CDP, the population was spread out, with 11.4% under the age of 18, 4.3% from 18 to 24, 31.4% from 25 to 44, 35.7% from 45 to 64, and 17.1% who were 65 years of age or older. The median age was 48 years. For every 100 females, there were 125.8 males. For every 100 females age 18 and over, there were 113.8 males.

The median income for a household in the CDP was $26,786, and the median income for a family was $33,036. Males had a median income of $23,036 versus $11,875 for females. The per capita income for the CDP was $14,733. There were no families and 15.7% of the population living below the poverty line, including no under eighteens and none of those over 64.

The population was 66 at the 2010 census.

== Education ==
It is within the Townsend K-12 Schools school district.

Radersburg students attend Townsend Elementary and Broadwater High School.

== Notable people ==
- Cecil Duff, pitcher for the Chicago White Sox
- Myrna Loy, film actress
