= John Jenkins (baseball) =

American baseball player (1896–1968)

- Infielder
- Born: July 7, 1896; Bosworth, Missouri
- Died: August 3, 1968; Columbia, Missouri
- Batted: Right Threw: Right

MLB debut
- August 5, 1922, for the Chicago White Sox

Last MLB appearance
- August 23, 1922, for the Chicago White Sox
- Stats at Baseball Reference

Teams
- Chicago White Sox (1922)

John Jenkins (July 7, 1896 – August 3, 1968) was a professional baseball player for the Chicago White Sox in Major League Baseball.
