= Ernie Cox (baseball) =

American baseball player (1894–1974)

- Pitcher
- Born: February 19, 1894; Birmingham, Alabama, U.S.
- Died: April 29, 1974 (aged 80); Birmingham, Alabama, U.S.
- Batted: Left Threw: Right

MLB debut
- May 5, 1922, for the Chicago White Sox

Last MLB appearance
- May 5, 1922, for the Chicago White Sox

MLB statistics
- Games pitched: 1
- Innings pitched: 1
- Earned run average: 18.00
- Stats at Baseball Reference

Teams
- Chicago White Sox (1922)

Ernest Thompson Cox (February 19, 1894 – April 29, 1974) was an American professional baseball pitcher who played in one game for the Chicago White Sox of Major League Baseball on May 5, 1922. He faced six batters, gave up one hit, two walks, and two earned runs for a career ERA of 18.00.
