= Cecil Duff =

American baseball player (1896–1969)

- Pitcher
- Born: November 20, 1896; Radersburg, Montana
- Died: November 10, 1969 (aged 72); Bend, Oregon
- Batted: Left Threw: Right

MLB debut
- September 5, 1922, for the Chicago White Sox

Last MLB appearance
- September 21, 1922, for the Chicago White Sox

MLB statistics
- Win–loss record: 1–1
- Earned run average: 4.97
- Strikeouts: 7
- Stats at Baseball Reference

Teams
- Chicago White Sox (1922)

Cecil Elba Duff (November 20, 1896 – November 10, 1969) was an American baseball pitcher for the Chicago White Sox, who made three appearances for the team in 1922 at the age of 25. He batted left-handed and threw right-handed. Duff was 6 ft 1 in (1.85 m), 175 pounds. He was born in Radersburg, Montana, and died in Bend, Oregon.
