= Shovel Hodge =

American baseball player (1893–1967)

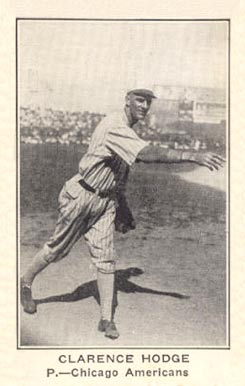
- Pitcher
- Born: July 6, 1893; Clayton, Alabama, U.S.
- Died: December 31, 1967 (aged 74); Ft. Walton Beach, Florida, U.S.
- Batted: Right Threw: Right

MLB debut
- September 6, 1920, for the Chicago White Sox

Last MLB appearance
- September 5, 1922, for the Chicago White Sox

MLB statistics
- Win–loss record: 14–15
- Earned run average: 5.17
- Strikeouts: 67
- Stats at Baseball Reference

Teams
- Chicago White Sox (1920–1922)

Clarence Clement "Shovel" Hodge (July 6, 1893 – December 31, 1967), was an American Major League Baseball pitcher who played from 1920 to 1922 with the Chicago White Sox. Listed at 6 feet 4 inches (1.93 m) tall and 190 pounds (86 kg), he batted left and threw right-handed.

Hodge had a 14–15 record with a 5.17 earned run average in 75 career games in his three-year career. He batted .250 with 29 hits as a big leaguer.

After his playing days he was an umpire in the Southern Association and Alabama State League. He also managed as "Mutt" Hodge in the Alabama-Florida League in 1936, 1950 and 1955.

He was born in Clayton, Alabama, and died in Ft. Walton Beach, Florida.
