= Emmett Bowles =

American baseball player (1898–1959)

- Pitcher
- Born: August 2, 1898; Wanette, Oklahoma
- Died: September 3, 1959 (aged 61); Flagstaff, Arizona
- Batted: Right Threw: Right

MLB debut
- September 12, 1922, for the Chicago White Sox

Last MLB appearance
- September 12, 1922, for the Chicago White Sox

MLB statistics
- Win–loss record: 0–0
- Earned run average: 27.00
- Strikeouts: 0
- Stats at Baseball Reference

Teams
- Chicago White Sox (1922)

Emmett Jerome "Chief" Bowles (August 2, 1898 – September 3, 1959) was a Major League Baseball pitcher who played in one game for the Chicago White Sox on September 12, 1922. He faced six batters, gave up two hits, one walk, and three earned runs.
