= Elmer Pence =

American baseball player (1900–1968)

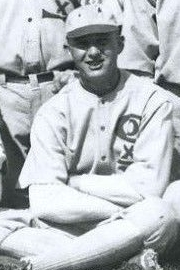
- Outfielder
- Born: August 17, 1900; Valley Springs, California
- Died: September 17, 1968 (aged 68); San Francisco, California
- Batted: Right Threw: Right

MLB debut
- August 23, 1922, for the Chicago White Sox

Last MLB appearance
- August 23, 1922, for the Chicago White Sox

MLB statistics
- Games played: 1
- At bats: 0
- Hits: 0
- Stats at Baseball Reference

Teams
- Chicago White Sox (1922)

Elmer Clair Pence (August 17, 1900 – September 17, 1968) was an outfielder in Major League Baseball. He played for the Chicago White Sox in 1922.
