= Dick McCabe (baseball) =

American baseball player (1896–1950)

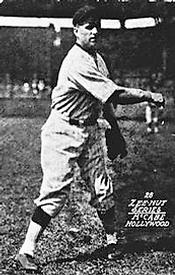
- Pitcher
- Born: February 21, 1896; Mamaroneck, New York, U.S.
- Died: April 11, 1950 (aged 54); Buffalo, New York, U.S.
- Batted: Right Threw: Right

MLB debut
- May 30, 1918, for the Boston Red Sox

Last MLB appearance
- June 21, 1922, for the Chicago White Sox

MLB statistics
- Win–loss record: 1-1
- Earned run average: 3.46
- Strikeouts: 4
- Stats at Baseball Reference

Teams
- Boston Red Sox (1918); Chicago White Sox (1922)

Richard James McCabe (February 21, 1896 – April 11, 1950) was an American pitcher in Major League Baseball who played for the Boston Red Sox (1918) and Chicago White Sox (1922). McCabe batted and threw right-handed. He was born in Mamaroneck, New York.

In a two-season-career, McCabe posted a 1-1 record with a 3.46 ERA in six appearances, including one start, four strikeouts, two walks, 17 hits allowed, and 13.0 innings of work.

McCabe died in Buffalo, New York at age 54.
