= John Russell (pitcher) =

American baseball player (1895–1930)

- Pitcher
- Born: October 20, 1895; San Mateo, California
- Died: November 19, 1930 (aged 35); Ely, Nevada
- Batted: Left Threw: Left

MLB debut
- July 4, 1917, for the Brooklyn Robins

Last MLB appearance
- June 12, 1922, for the Chicago White Sox

MLB statistics
- Win–loss record: 2–7
- Earned run average: 5.40
- Strikeouts: 19
- Stats at Baseball Reference

Teams
- Brooklyn Robins (1917–1918); Chicago White Sox (1921–1922)

John Albert Russell (October 20, 1895 – November 19, 1930) was a pitcher in Major League Baseball. He pitched in six games for Brooklyn Robins in the 1917 and 1918 seasons and then in fifteen games for the Chicago White Sox in 1921–1922.

In 1918 Russell served in the military during World War I. He died on November 19, 1930. He was interred at Cypress Lawn Memorial Park.
