= Augie Swentor =

American baseball player (1899–1969)

- Pinch hitter
- Born: November 21, 1899; Seymour, Connecticut, U.S.
- Died: November 10, 1969 (aged 69); Waterbury, Connecticut, U.S.
- Batted: Right Threw: Right

MLB debut
- September 12, 1922, for the Chicago White Sox

Last MLB appearance
- September 12, 1922, for the Chicago White Sox

MLB statistics
- Games played: 1
- At bats: 1
- Hits: 0
- Stats at Baseball Reference

Teams
- Chicago White Sox (1922)

August William Swentor (November 21, 1899 – November 10, 1969) was an American pinch hitter in Major League Baseball. He played one game for the Chicago White Sox in 1922.
