= Harry Courtney =

American baseball player (1898–1954)

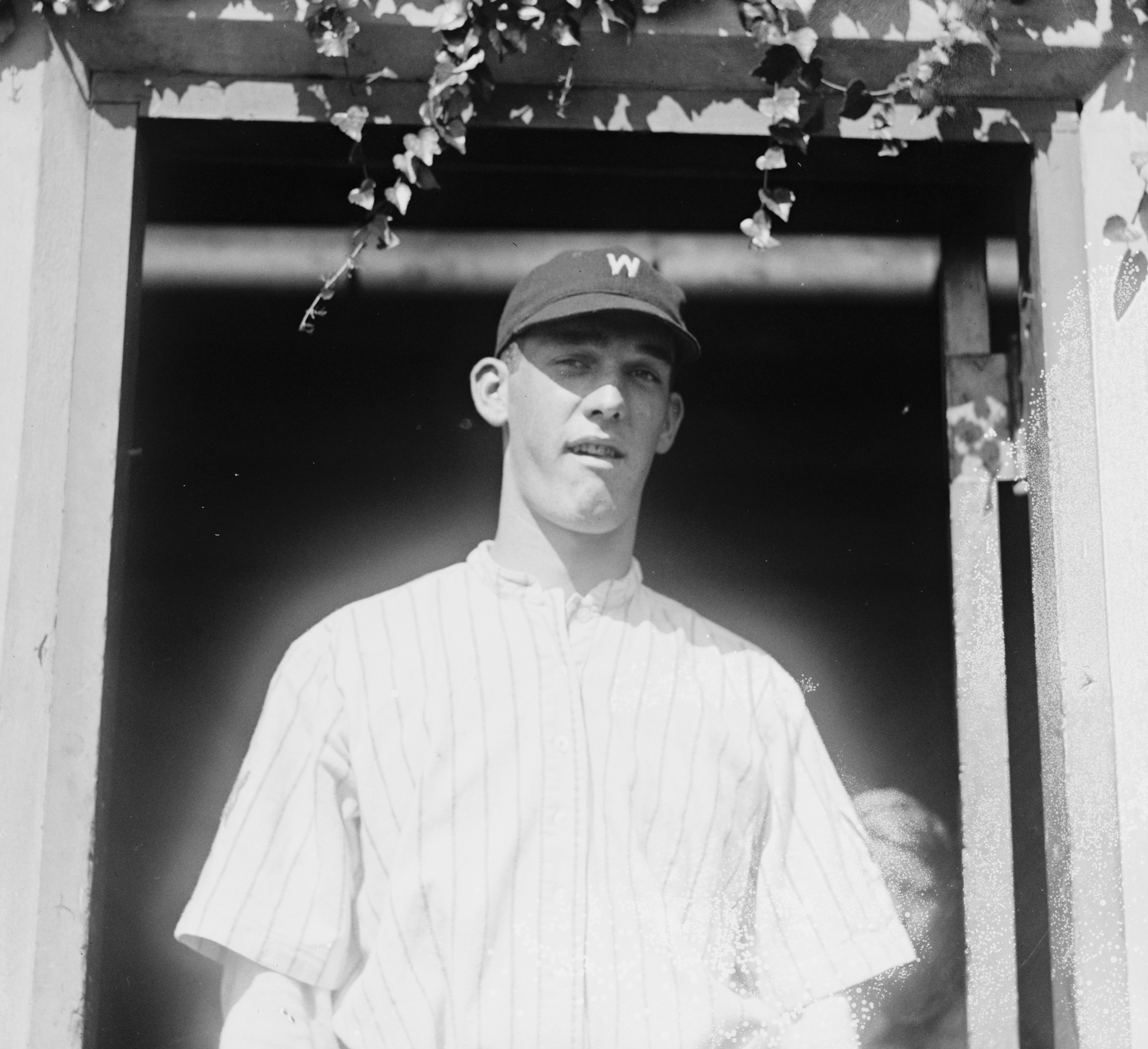
- Pitcher
- Born: November 19, 1898; Asheville, North Carolina, U.S.
- Died: December 11, 1954 (aged 56); Lyme, Connecticut, U.S.
- Batted: Left Threw: Left

MLB debut
- September 13, 1919, for the Washington Senators

Last MLB appearance
- September 3, 1922, for the Chicago White Sox

MLB statistics
- Win–loss record: 22–26
- Earned run average: 4.91
- Strikeouts: 112
- Stats at Baseball Reference

Teams
- Washington Senators (1919–1922); Chicago White Sox (1922)

Henry Seymour Courtney (November 19, 1898 – December 11, 1954) was an American professional baseball pitcher who played in the Major Leagues from 1919–1922 for the Washington Senators and Chicago White Sox.

He also played for the Washington Senators of the American Professional Football Association in 1921. That season signed with the football Senators for their November 20 game against a team from Clarksburg, West Virginia. However Clark Griffith, the owner of the baseball Senators, found out about Courtney moonlighting as a football player. Griffith ordered Courtney to stop playing football or risk finding himself without a job in baseball. Courtney gave up his football career and continued to focus only on baseball.

He was born in Asheville, North Carolina and died in Lyme, Connecticut.
