= Jimmie Long =

American baseball player (1898–1970)

- Catcher
- Born: June 29, 1898; Fort Dodge, Iowa
- Died: September 14, 1970 (aged 72); Fort Dodge, Iowa
- Batted: Right Threw: Right

MLB debut
- September 12, 1922, for the Chicago White Sox

Last MLB appearance
- September 30, 1922, for the Chicago White Sox

MLB statistics
- Games played: 3
- At bats: 3
- Hits: 0
- Stats at Baseball Reference

Teams
- Chicago White Sox (1922)

James Albert Long (June 29, 1898 – September 14, 1970) was a catcher in Major League Baseball. He played for the Chicago White Sox.
