= Lum Davenport =

American baseball player (1900–1961)

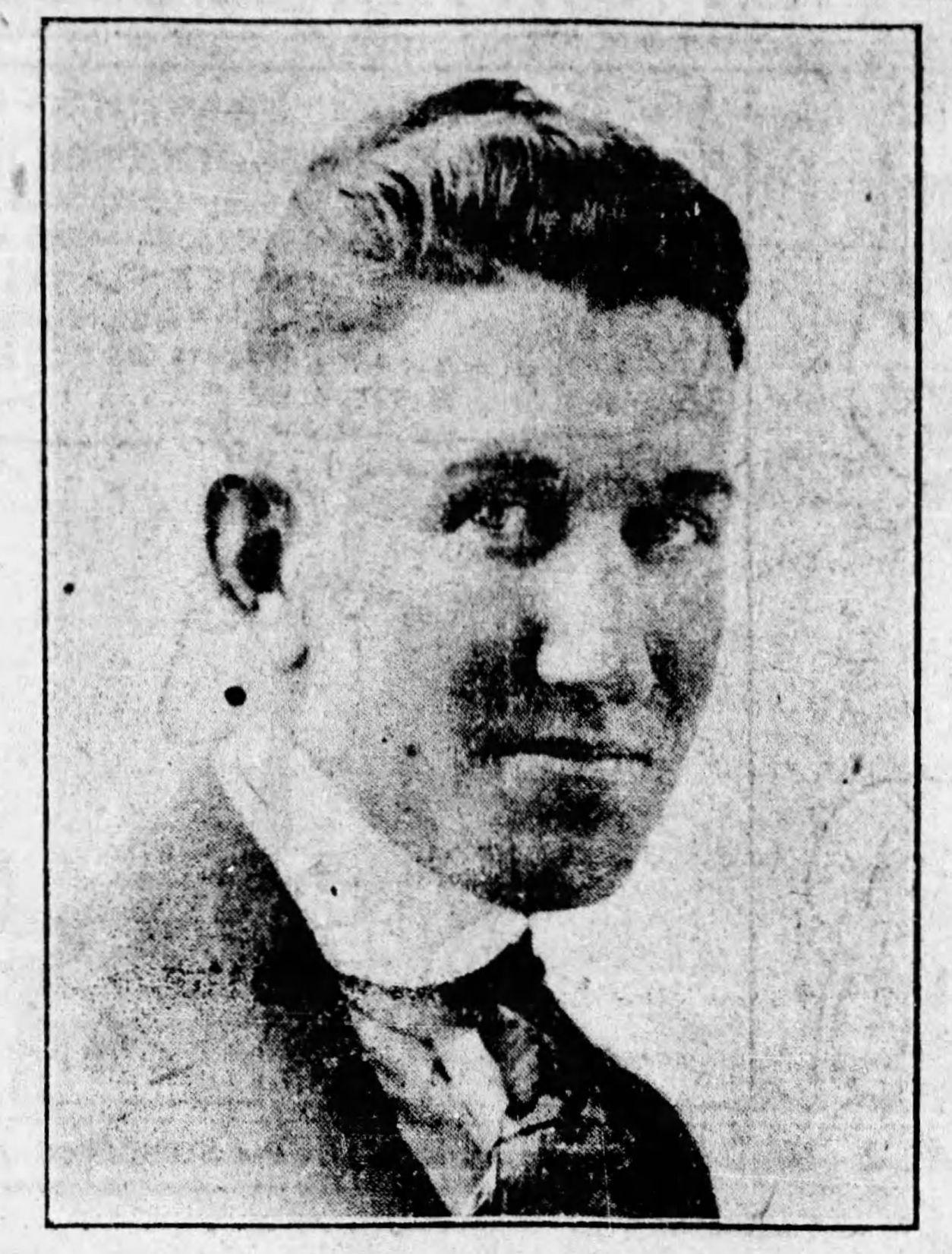
- Pitcher
- Born: June 27, 1900; Tucson, Arizona
- Died: April 21, 1961 (aged 60); Dallas, Texas
- Batted: Left Threw: Left

MLB debut
- May 2, 1921, for the Chicago White Sox

Last MLB appearance
- April 20, 1924, for the Chicago White Sox

MLB statistics
- Win–loss record: 1–4
- Strikeouts: 20
- Earned run average: 7.71
- Stats at Baseball Reference

Teams
- Chicago White Sox (1921–1924)

Joubert Lum Davenport (June 27, 1900 – April 21, 1961) was a Major League Baseball pitcher. He played parts of four seasons in the majors, from 1921 until 1924, for the Chicago White Sox.

== Sources ==
- Career statistics from Baseball Reference · Baseball Reference (Minors) · Retrosheet
