= Charlie Robertson =

American baseball player (1896–1984)

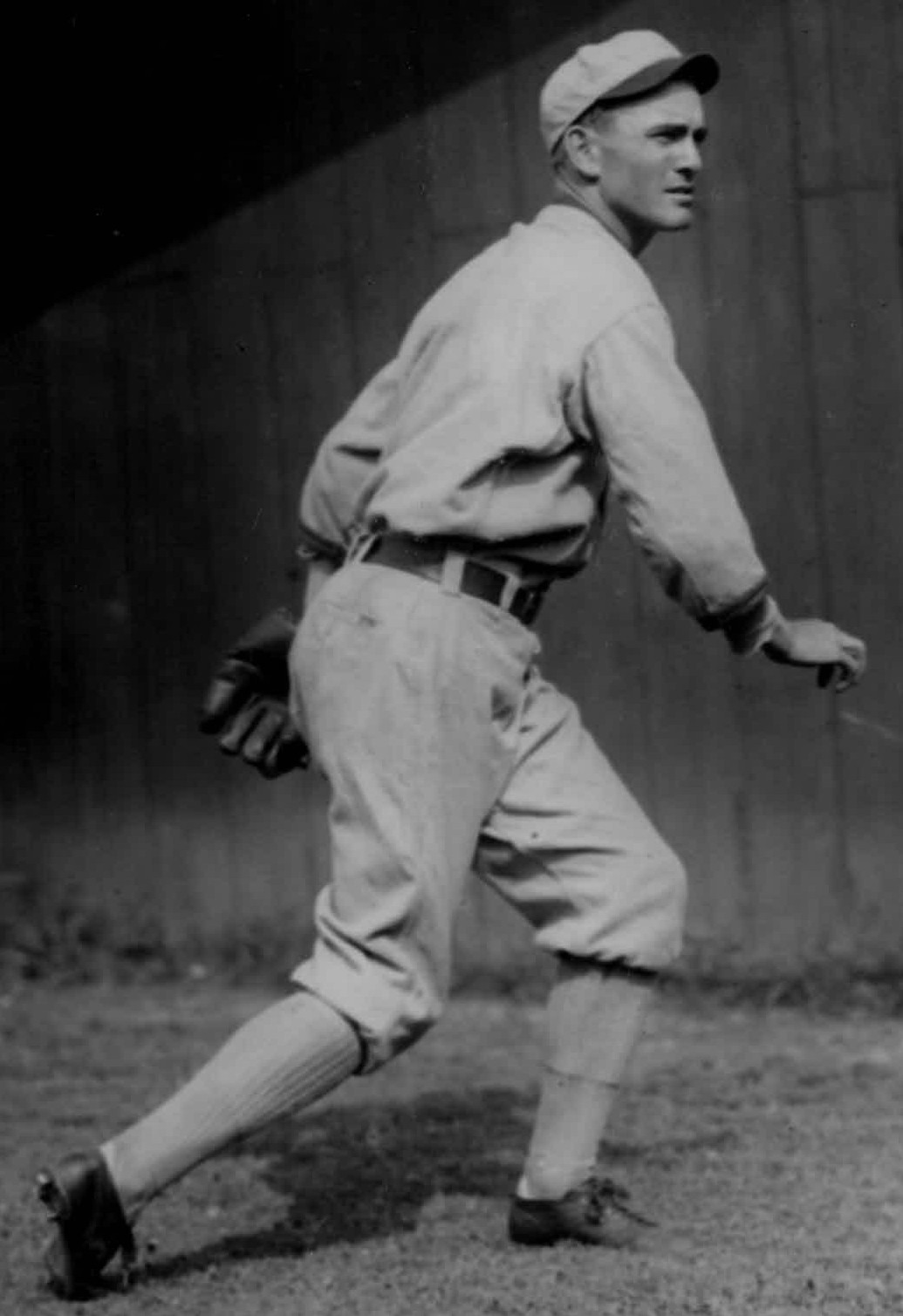
- Pitcher
- Born: January 31, 1896; Dexter, Texas, U.S.
- Died: August 23, 1984 (aged 88); Fort Worth, Texas, U.S.
- Batted: Left Threw: Right

MLB debut
- May 13, 1919, for the Chicago White Sox

Last MLB appearance
- June 18, 1928, for the Boston Braves

MLB statistics
- Win–loss record: 49–80
- Earned run average: 4.44
- Strikeouts: 310
- Stats at Baseball Reference

Teams
- Chicago White Sox (1919, 1922–1925); St. Louis Browns (1926); Boston Braves (1927–1928)

Career highlights and awards
- Pitched a perfect game on April 30, 1922

Charles Culbertson Robertson (January 31, 1896 – August 23, 1984) was an American professional baseball player. He played in Major League Baseball as a pitcher, and is best remembered for throwing a perfect game in 1922.

== Early life and career ==
Robertson was born in Dexter, Texas and grew up in Nocona, Texas. He graduated from Nocona High School in 1915. Charles attended Austin College from 1917 until 1919.

He began his career with the Chicago White Sox in 1919 at the age of 23. Robertson was an average player for most of his career, having a career record of 49–80 and never winning more than he lost during a single season.

His main pitch throughout his career was a slow curveball which he often threw on the first pitch to a batter on any side of the plate, followed by a fastball up in the zone.

== Perfect Game ==
On April 30, 1922, in just his fourth career start, he pitched the fifth perfect game in baseball history against the Detroit Tigers at Navin Field (later known as Tiger Stadium) in Detroit. He became the first pitcher in major league history to throw a perfect game on the road.

The Detroit lineup featured such Hall of Famers as Ty Cobb and Harry Heilmann, who both complained that he was doctoring the ball throughout the game. The Tigers submitted several game balls to American League President Ban Johnson after the game to check for irregularities, but Johnson dismissed the charge.

Robertson's perfect game was the last for 34 years, when Don Larsen pitched one in the 1956 World Series against the Brooklyn Dodgers; the next regular season perfect game would not come until Jim Bunning's perfect game in 1964.

After the perfect game, he suffered arm troubles for the rest of his career. He pitched one season for the St. Louis Browns and two years with the Boston Braves and retired from baseball in 1928.

== Personal life ==
After retiring from baseball, Robertson became a prosperous pecan broker in Fort Worth, Texas. He returned to the limelight after Don Larsen threw a perfect game in the 1956 World Series, the first in the Major Leagues since Robertson's own 34 years earlier. Six days after Larsen's game, Robertson appeared as a contestant on What's My Line?.

Robertson was married to Fay Redus, whom he met when he was first invited to spring training by the Chicago White Sox. He died in 1984 in Fort Worth, Texas, at age 88, and was the last surviving player who played for the 1919 Chicago White Sox. (Note: Robertson only appeared in one game with that team, in May, and was not on team when they played in the World Series.)

== See also ==
- List of Major League Baseball perfect games

Awards and achievements
Preceded by Red Faber	Chicago White Sox Opening Day; Starting pitcher 1924	Succeeded by Sloppy Thurston
Preceded by Addie Joss	Perfect game pitcher April 30, 1922	Succeeded by Don Larsen
Preceded by Walter Johnson	No-hitter pitcher April 30, 1922	Succeeded by Jesse Barnes
