= Ted Blankenship =

American baseball player (1901–1945)

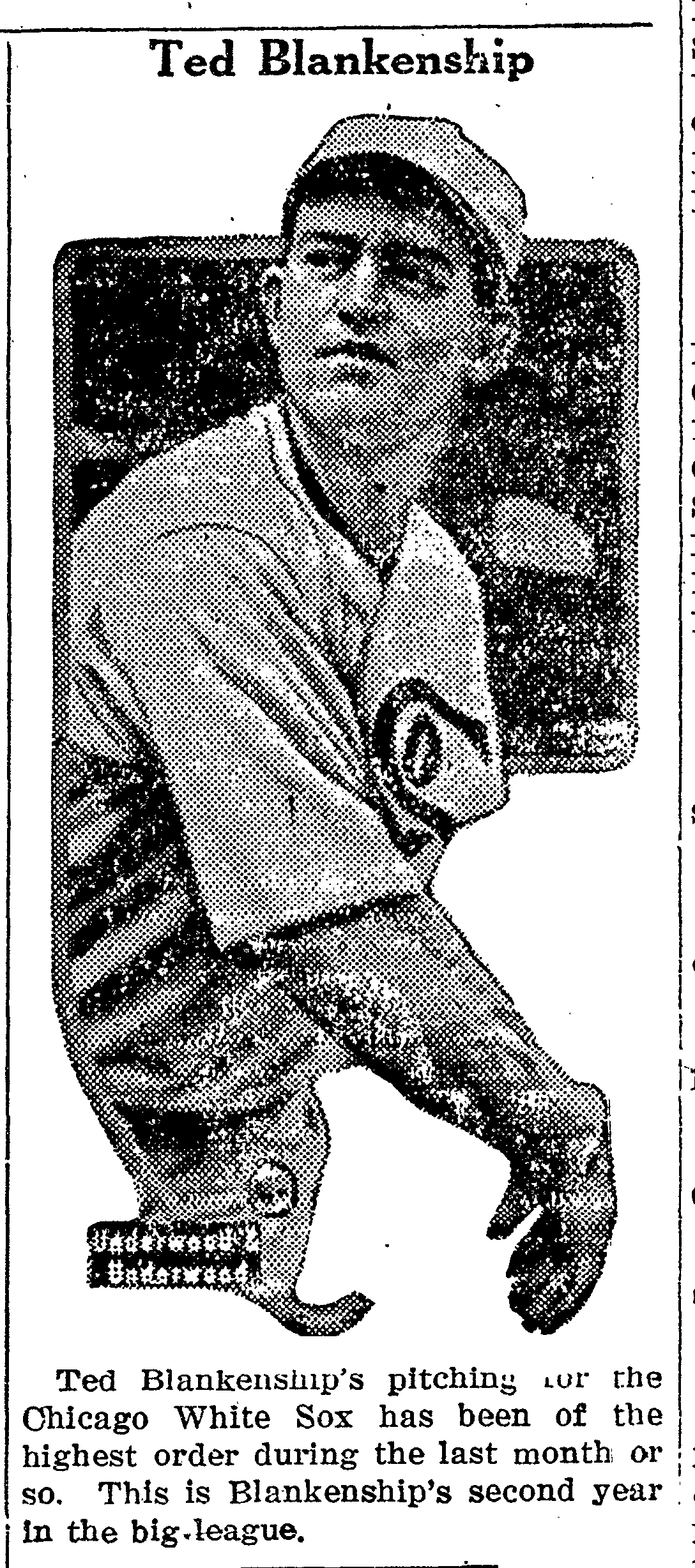
- Pitcher
- Born: May 10, 1901; Bonham, Texas, U.S.
- Died: January 14, 1945 (aged 43); Atoka, Oklahoma, U.S.
- Batted: Right Threw: Right

MLB debut
- July 2, 1922, for the Chicago White Sox

Last MLB appearance
- May 24, 1930, for the Chicago White Sox

MLB statistics
- Win–loss record: 77–79
- Earned run average: 4.29
- Strikeouts: 378
- Stats at Baseball Reference

Teams
- Chicago White Sox (1922–1930)

Theodore Blankenship (May 10, 1901 – January 14, 1945) was an American pitcher in Major League Baseball. He played for the Chicago White Sox from 1922 to 1930. His key pitch was the fastball.

Ted's best season came in 1925 when he won 17 games and lost only eight, posting a 3.03 earned run average. He was also a fairly good hitting pitcher in his major league career, posting a .196 batting average (93-for-475) with 49 runs, 9 home runs and 55 RBI over a nine-year, 242 game career. He was a year older than his brother Homer Blankenship, who pitched briefly in the major leagues in 1922, 1923, and 1928.
