= Eddie Mulligan =

American baseball player (1894–1982)

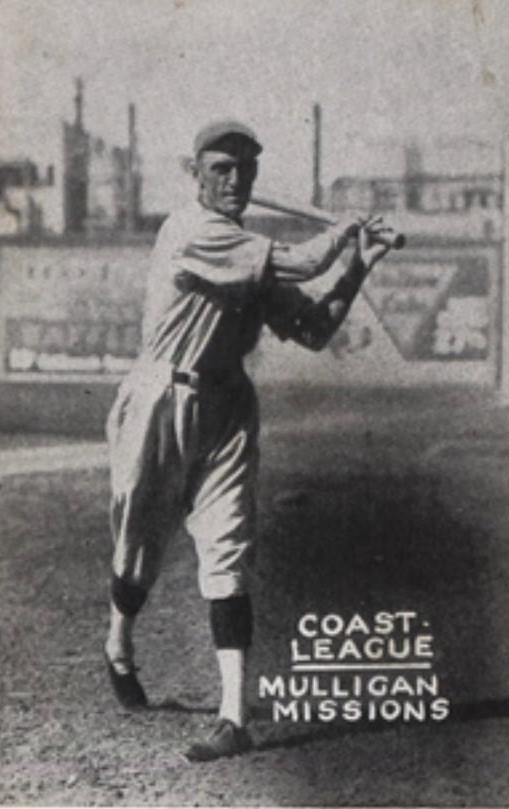
- 1931 baseball card of Mulligan
- Third baseman
- Born: August 27, 1894; St. Louis, Missouri, U.S.
- Died: March 15, 1982 (aged 87); San Rafael, California, U.S.
- Batted: Right Threw: Right

MLB debut
- September 23, 1915, for the Chicago Cubs

Last MLB appearance
- August 20, 1928, for the Pittsburgh Pirates

MLB statistics
- Batting average: .232
- Home runs: 1
- Runs batted in: 88
- Stats at Baseball Reference

Teams
- Chicago Cubs (1915–1916); Chicago White Sox (1921–1922); Pittsburgh Pirates (1928)

Edward Joseph Mulligan (August 27, 1894 – March 15, 1982) was an American professional baseball third baseman from 1914 to 1939. He played in Major League Baseball (MLB) for the Chicago Cubs, Chicago White Sox, and Pittsburgh Pirates. Mulligan also spent many seasons in the minors, mostly in the Pacific Coast League (PCL). After his playing career, he was a team owner and league president in the minors.

== Career ==
Mulligan was born in St. Louis, Missouri, in 1894. He attended Saint Louis University.

Mulligan started his professional baseball career in 1914. In 1915, he played 124 games for the Davenport Blue Sox of the Illinois–Indiana–Iowa League and had a .279 batting average. Mulligan then joined the Chicago Cubs of the National League (NL), making his MLB debut in September. He played 11 games for the Cubs in 1915 and batted .364.

In 1916, Mulligan played 58 games for the Cubs and batted .153. In July, he was traded to the Kansas City Blues of the American Association. In 55 games for the Blues, he batted .238.

Mulligan spent most of 1917 with the Blues. He was then out of professional baseball in 1918.

In 1919, Mulligan returned to professional baseball with the Salt Lake City Bees of the PCL. He batted .269 in 137 games. The following season, he batted .299 in 179 games.

In 1921, Mulligan returned to the majors with the American League's Chicago White Sox. He replaced Buck Weaver, who had been suspended in the Black Sox Scandal, at third base. Mulligan batted .251 in 151 games. The following season, he batted .234 in 103 games. In October 1922, the White Sox traded him to the PCL's San Francisco Seals.

In 1923, Mulligan batted .329 in 155 games. In 1924, he batted .306 in 199 games. In 1925, he batted .286 in 180 games. In 1926, he batted .263 in 182 games. In 1927, he batted .274 in 170 games.

Mulligan was purchased by the NL's Pittsburgh Pirates in March 1928. He batted .233 in 27 games and played his last major league game in August.

Mulligan then joined the PCL's Mission Reds for the 1929 season. He batted .279 in 181 games. In 1930, he batted .300 in 201 games. In 1931, he batted .280 in 94 games.

Mulligan played in the PCL in 1932. In 1933, with the PCL's Portland Beavers, he batted .294 in 177 games. In 1934, with the PCL's Oakland Oaks, he batted .269 in 184 games.

Mulligan played in the PCL in 1935. From 1936 to 1938, he was a coach for the PCL's San Diego Padres and received limited playing time.

From 1939 to 1949, Mulligan was the owner of the Pioneer League's Salt Lake City Bees. He managed the team in 1939 and appeared in three games as a player, which were the final games of his professional baseball career.

In his major league career, Mulligan played 350 games and had 1,390 plate appearances, 287 hits, a .232 batting average, and a 54 OPS+. In his minor league career, he played 2,505 games and had 9,573 plate appearances and 2,710 hits.

Mulligan was part owner of the PCL's Sacramento Solons from 1951 to 1955. From 1956 to 1975, he was the president of the California League. Mulligan was presented with the King of Baseball award in 1964. Since 1976, the Eddie Mulligan Award has been given to the California League's rookie of the year.

Mulligan was elected to the Pacific Coast League Hall of Fame. He died in San Rafael, California, in 1982. He was interred at Holy Cross Cemetery in Colma, California.
