= Homer Blankenship =

American baseball player (1902–1974)

- Pitcher
- Born: August 4, 1902; Bonham, Texas, U.S.
- Died: June 22, 1974 (aged 71); Longview, Texas, U.S.
- Batted: Right Threw: Right

MLB debut
- September 6, 1922, for the Chicago White Sox

Last MLB appearance
- September 27, 1928, for the Pittsburgh Pirates

MLB statistics
- Win–loss record: 1–3
- Earned run average: 5.22
- Strikeouts: 10
- Stats at Baseball Reference

Teams
- Chicago White Sox (1922–1923); Pittsburgh Pirates (1928)

Homer "Si" Blankenship (August 4, 1902 – June 22, 1974) was an American pitcher in Major League Baseball with the Chicago White Sox and Pittsburgh Pirates.

Blankenship, a Cherokee Native American, was born in Bonham, Texas, and attended high school in Ada, Oklahoma. He is a year younger than his brother Ted Blankenship, who pitched in the major leagues for 9 seasons. Homer made his MLB debut for the White Sox in 1922, at the age of 20. He played in Chicago for parts of two seasons. Besides a short stint with the Pirates in 1928, he then pitched in the Texas League from 1926 to 1930. He won a career-high 17 games for the Shreveport Sports in 1926.

Blankenship retired from professional baseball in 1931. He died in 1974 in Longview, Texas.
