= Frank Mack =

American baseball player (1900–1971)

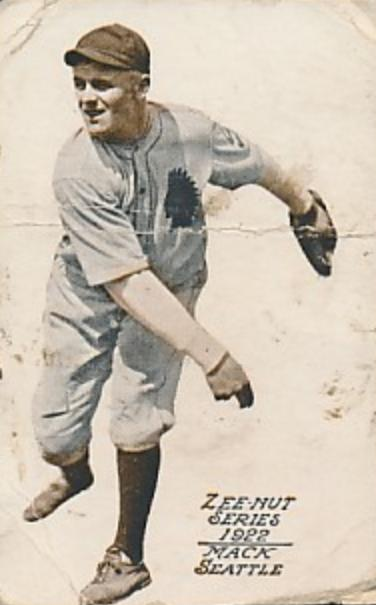
- Pitcher
- Born: February 2, 1900; Oklahoma City, Oklahoma Territory
- Died: July 2, 1971 (aged 71); Clearwater, Florida, U.S.
- Batted: Right Threw: Right

MLB debut
- August 16, 1922, for the Chicago White Sox

Last MLB appearance
- June 15, 1925, for the Chicago White Sox

MLB statistics
- Win–loss record: 2-3
- Earned run average: 4.94
- Strikeouts: 23
- Stats at Baseball Reference

Teams
- Chicago White Sox (1922–1923, 1925)

Frank George Mack (February 2, 1900 – July 2, 1971) was an American pitcher in Major League Baseball. He played for the Chicago White Sox.
