= Dixie Leverett =

American baseball player (1894–1957)

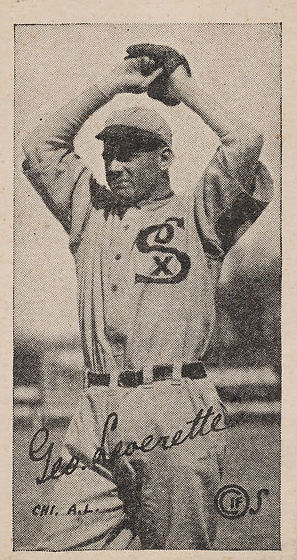
- Pitcher
- Born: March 29, 1894; Georgetown, Texas, U.S.
- Died: February 20, 1957 (aged 62); Beaverton, Oregon, U.S.
- Batted: Right Threw: Right

MLB debut
- May 6, 1922, for the Chicago White Sox

Last MLB appearance
- September 27, 1929, for the Boston Braves

MLB statistics
- Win–loss record: 29–34
- Earned run average: 4.51
- Strikeouts: 193
- Stats at Baseball Reference

Teams
- Chicago White Sox (1922–1924, 1926); Boston Braves (1929)

Gorham Vance "Dixie" Leverett (March 29, 1894 – February 20, 1957) was an American pitcher in Major League Baseball. He played for the Chicago White Sox and Boston Braves.
