= Roy Graham (baseball) =

American baseball player (1895–1933)

- Catcher
- Born: February 22, 1895; San Francisco, California, U.S.
- Died: April 26, 1933 (aged 38); Manila, Philippines
- Batted: Right Threw: Right

MLB debut
- May 28, 1922, for the Chicago White Sox

Last MLB appearance
- October 7, 1923, for the Chicago White Sox

MLB statistics
- Batting average: .188
- Home runs: 0
- Runs batted in: 6
- Stats at Baseball Reference

Teams
- Chicago White Sox (1922–1923)

Roy Vincent Graham (February 22, 1895 – April 26, 1933) was an American catcher in Major League Baseball. He played for the Chicago White Sox.
