= Hervey McClellan =

American baseball player (1894–1925)

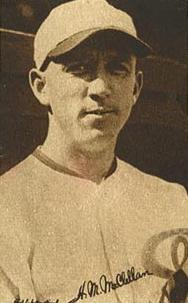
- Infielder
- Born: December 22, 1894; Cynthiana, Kentucky, U.S.
- Died: November 6, 1925 (aged 30); Cynthiana, Kentucky, U.S.
- Batted: Right Threw: Right

MLB debut
- May 31, 1919, for the Chicago White Sox

Last MLB appearance
- September 29, 1924, for the Chicago White Sox

MLB statistics
- Batting average: .221
- Home runs: 4
- Runs batted in: 98
- Stats at Baseball Reference

Teams
- Chicago White Sox (1919–1924)

Hervey McDowell McClellan (December 22, 1894 – November 6, 1925) was an American Major League Baseball infielder.

McClellan started his professional baseball career in 1914. He played two years for the Lexington Colts of the Ohio State League, hitting below .200 both years. Many reporters of the era mistakenly called him Harvey.

McClellan joined the Chicago White Sox in 1919. He sat on the bench during the next few years but got more playing time when the team's stars were suspended in the Black Sox Scandal. In 1922, he was playing third base in a charity exhibition pitting all-star players from the New England and American Leagues against the Boston Red Sox and in the fourth inning pitched a ball to first baseman Elizabeth "Lizzie" Murphy. The historical game was the first time a woman had played against major league players. He was the starting shortstop for one season, 1923.

In 1925, McClellan died in his hometown after a five-month-long illness.
