= Earl Sheely =

American baseball player (1893–1952)

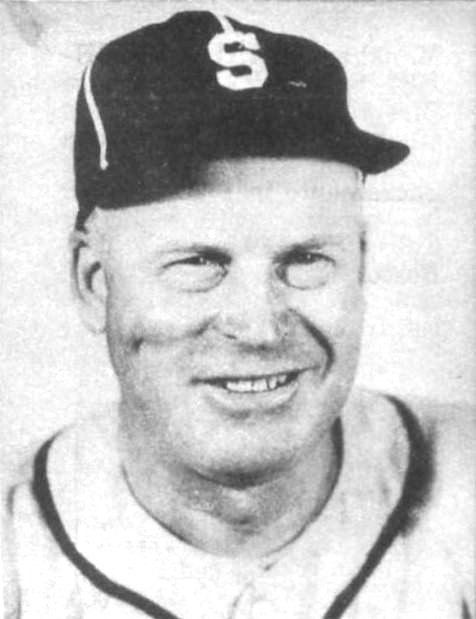
- Sheely in 1946
- First baseman
- Born: February 12, 1893; Bushnell, Illinois, U.S.
- Died: September 16, 1952 (aged 59); Seattle, Washington, U.S.
- Batted: Right Threw: Right

MLB debut
- April 14, 1921, for the Chicago White Sox

Last MLB appearance
- September 27, 1931, for the Boston Braves

MLB statistics
- Batting average: .300
- Home runs: 48
- Runs batted in: 745
- Stats at Baseball Reference

Teams
- Chicago White Sox (1921–1927); Pittsburgh Pirates (1929); Boston Braves (1931)

Earl Homer Sheely (February 12, 1893 – September 16, 1952) was an American professional baseball first baseman. He played in Major League Baseball (MLB) for the Chicago White Sox (1921–27), Pittsburgh Pirates (1929) and Boston Braves (1931).

Sheely finished sixth in voting for the 1925 American League MVP award, playing in 153 games with having 600 at-bats, 93 runs, 189 hits, 43 doubles, 3 triples, 9 home runs, 111 RBI, 3 stolen bases, 68 walks, .315 batting average, .389 on-base percentage, .442 slugging percentage, 265 total bases and 26 sacrifice hits.

He currently ranks 92nd on the MLB list for career sacrifice hits (189).

Over nine seasons, Sheely played in 1,234 games and had 4,471 at-bats, 572 runs, 1,340 hits, 244 doubles, 27 triples, 48 home runs, 745 RBI, 33 stolen bases, 563 walks, .300 batting average, .383 on-base percentage, .399 slugging percentage, 1,782 total bases and 189 sacrifice hits. Defensively, he recorded a .991 fielding percentage at first base.

He also served as a scout for the Boston Red Sox and general manager of the Seattle Rainiers, a Pacific Coast League team.

Sheely is an inductee of the Pacific Coast League Hall of Fame.

He died in Seattle, Washington, at the age of 59.

== Personal life ==
Sheely's son Bud was a catcher for the White Sox from 1951 to 1953.
