= Johnny Mostil =

American baseball player (1896–1970)

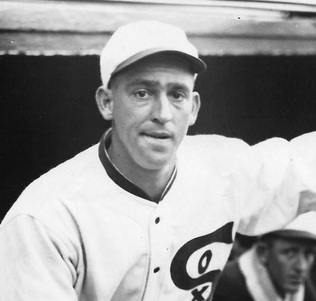
- Mostil in 1927
- Center fielder
- Born: June 1, 1896; Chicago, Illinois, U.S.
- Died: December 10, 1970 (aged 74); Midlothian, Illinois, U.S.
- Batted: Right Threw: Right

MLB debut
- June 20, 1918, for the Chicago White Sox

Last MLB appearance
- May 19, 1929, for the Chicago White Sox

MLB statistics
- Batting average: .301
- Home runs: 23
- Runs batted in: 375
- Stats at Baseball Reference

Teams
- Chicago White Sox (1918, 1921–1929)

Career highlights and awards
- 2× AL stolen base leader (1925, 1926)

John Anthony Mostil (June 1, 1896 – December 10, 1970) was an American professional baseball center fielder. He played for the Chicago White Sox of Major League Baseball (MLB) during the 1920s, and afterwards he worked as a minor league manager and a scout.

== Major league career ==
Mostil was born in Chicago, Illinois, in 1896. He started his professional baseball career in 1918 with the Chicago White Sox of the American League (AL). That season, he appeared in 10 games and had a batting average of .273.

Mostil then spent two seasons with the American Association's Milwaukee Brewers. He batted .268 in 1919 and .318 in 1920.

Mostil returned to the White Sox in 1921 after several of the team's players were suspended from organized baseball in the Black Sox Scandal. Mostil became the White Sox's regular center fielder. He batted .301 in 1921, .303 in 1922, .291 in 1923, and .325 in 1924.

In 1925, Mostil batted .299 and led the AL with 716 plate appearances, 135 runs scored, 43 stolen bases, and 90 walks. In 1926, he had his best season, batting .328 with a 133 OPS+ and leading the AL with 35 stolen bases; he finished second in the AL most valuable player voting.

In March 1927, Mostil attempted suicide by cutting himself multiple times with a pocketknife and a razor. He had been dealing with neuritis, dental problems, and other personal issues. Mostil recovered and appeared in 13 games that season, batting .125.

Mostil played his last full MLB season in 1928, batting .270. In early 1929, he appeared in 12 games, batting .229, before his MLB career ended.

During his MLB career, Mostil appeared in 972 games and had 1,054 hits, 23 home runs, 618 runs scored, 375 runs batted in, 176 stolen bases, a .301 batting average, and a 113 OPS+. He was regarded as a great outfielder. In the 2001 book The New Bill James Historical Baseball Abstract, Bill James ranked Mostil as the 99th greatest center fielder of all-time.

== Later life ==
Mostil was a part-time player in the minor leagues from 1930 to 1932. From 1933 to 1937, he was a player-manager for the Eau Claire Bears of the Northern League. Mostil continued to manage in the minors until 1948 and then was a scout for over a decade. He died in Midlothian, Illinois, in 1970.

== See also ==
- List of Major League Baseball annual runs scored leaders
- List of Major League Baseball annual stolen base leaders
- List of Major League Baseball players who spent their entire career with one franchise
