= 1924 Chicago White Sox season =

1924 Chicago White Sox
- League: American League
- Ballpark: Comiskey Park
- City: Chicago, Illinois
- Record: 66–87 (.431)
- League place: 8th
- Owners: Charles Comiskey
- Managers: Johnny Evers, Ed Walsh, Eddie Collins
- Radio: WMAQ (Hal Totten)

The 1924 Chicago White Sox season was a season in major league baseball. Despite the best efforts of player-manager Eddie Collins, the White Sox finished last in the American League for the first time. This was the last year of the "Chicago Chicken Curse", which would be broken next year by the Chicago Bears.

== Regular season ==
=== Season standings ===
American League
Team	W	L	Pct.	GB	Home	Road
Washington Senators	92	62	.597	—	47‍–‍30	45‍–‍32
New York Yankees	89	63	.586	2	45‍–‍32	44‍–‍31
Detroit Tigers	86	68	.558	6	45‍–‍33	41‍–‍35
St. Louis Browns	74	78	.487	17	41‍–‍36	33‍–‍42
Philadelphia Athletics	71	81	.467	20	36‍–‍39	35‍–‍42
Cleveland Indians	67	86	.438	24½	37‍–‍38	30‍–‍48
Boston Red Sox	67	87	.435	25	41‍–‍36	26‍–‍51
Chicago White Sox	66	87	.431	25½	37‍–‍39	29‍–‍48

=== Record vs. opponents ===
1924 American League record Sources:
Team	BOS	CWS	CLE	DET	NYY	PHA	SLB	WSH
Boston	—	10–12	14–8	6–16	5–17–1	12–10	11–11–1	9–13–1
Chicago	12–10	—	11–11	8–14–1	6–16	11–11	13–8	5–17
Cleveland	8–14	11–11	—	7–15	8–14	11–11	11–10	11–11
Detroit	16–6	14–8–1	15–7	—	13–9	11–11	9–13	8–14–1
New York	17–5–1	16–6	14–8	9–13	—	12–8	12–10	9–13
Philadelphia	10–12	11–11	11–11	11–11	8–12	—	13–9	7–15
St. Louis	11–11–1	8–13	10–11	13–9	10–12	9–13	—	13–9
Washington	13–9–1	17–5	11–11	14–8–1	13–9	15–7	9–13	—

=== Roster ===
1924 Chicago White Sox
Roster
Pitchers: Bob Barnes; Ted Blankenship; Sarge Connally; Mike Cvengros; Lum Davenport; John Dobb; Red Faber; Happy Foreman; Bob Lawrence; Dixie Leverett; Ted Lyons; Leo Mangum; Doug McWeeny; Charlie Robertson; Webb Schultz; Milt Steengrafe; Sloppy Thurston	Catchers: Joe Burns; Buck Crouse; Johnny Grabowski; Ray Schalk; Kettle Wirts; Infielders: Bill Barrett; Bill Black; Bud Clancy; Eddie Collins; Wally Dashiell; Ike Davis; Bernie DeViveiros; Ray French; Willie Kamm; Hervey McClellan; Ray Morehart; Frank Naleway; Earl Sheely	Outfielders: Maurice Archdeacon; Roy Elsh; Bibb Falk; Harry Hooper; Johnny Mostil; Other batters: Amos Strunk	Manager: Eddie Collins; Johnny Evers; Ed Walsh; Coaches: Johnny Evers; Ed Walsh

== Player stats ==
=== Batting ===
==== Starters by position ====
Note: Pos = Position; G = Games played; AB = At bats; H = Hits; Avg. = Batting average; HR = Home runs; RBI = Runs batted in

Pos	Player	G	AB	H	Avg.	HR	RBI
C	Buck Crouse	94	305	79	.259	1	44
1B	Earl Sheely	146	535	171	.320	3	103
2B	Eddie Collins	152	556	194	.349	6	86
SS	Bill Barrett	119	406	110	.271	2	56
3B	Willie Kamm	147	528	134	.254	6	93
OF	Johnny Mostil	118	385	125	.325	4	49
OF	Harry Hooper	130	476	156	.328	10	62
OF	Bibb Falk	138	526	185	.352	6	99

==== Other batters ====
Note: G = Games played; AB = At bats; H = Hits; Avg. = Batting average; HR = Home runs; RBI = Runs batted in

Player	G	AB	H	Avg.	HR	RBI
Maurice Archdeacon	95	288	92	.319	0	25
Ray Schalk	57	153	30	.196	1	11
Roy Elsh	60	147	45	.306	0	11
Ray French	37	112	20	.179	0	11
Ray Morehart	31	100	20	.200	0	8
Hervey McClellan	32	85	15	.176	0	9
Johnny Grabowski	20	56	14	.250	0	3
Bud Clancy	13	35	9	.257	0	6
Ike Davis	10	33	8	.242	0	4
Joe Burns	8	19	2	.105	0	0
Kettle Wirts	6	12	1	.083	0	0
Bill Black	6	5	1	.200	0	0
Frank Naleway	1	2	0	.000	0	0
Wally Dashiell	1	2	0	.000	0	0
Bernie DeViveiros	1	1	0	.000	0	0
Amos Strunk	1	1	0	.000	0	0

=== Pitching ===
==== Starting pitchers ====
Note: G = Games pitched; IP = Innings pitched; W = Wins; L = Losses; ERA = Earned run average; SO = Strikeouts

Player	G	IP	W	L	ERA	SO
Sloppy Thurston	38	291.0	20	14	3.80	37
Red Faber	21	161.1	9	11	3.85	47
Charlie Robertson	17	97.1	4	10	4.99	29

==== Other pitchers ====
Note: G = Games pitched; IP = Innings pitched; W = Wins; L = Losses; ERA = Earned run average; SO = Strikeouts

Player	G	IP	W	L	ERA	SO
Ted Lyons	41	216.1	12	11	4.87	52
Sarge Connally	44	160.0	7	13	4.05	55
Ted Blankenship	25	129.1	7	6	5.01	36
Mike Cvengros	26	105.2	3	12	5.88	36
Dixie Leverett	21	99.0	2	3	5.82	29
Leo Mangum	13	47.0	1	4	7.09	12
Doug McWeeny	13	43.1	1	3	4.57	18

==== Relief pitchers ====
Note: G = Games pitched; W = Wins; L = Losses; SV = Saves; ERA = Earned run average; SO = Strikeouts

Player	G	W	L	SV	ERA	SO
Milt Steengrafe	3	0	0	0	12.71	3
Happy Foreman	3	0	0	0	2.25	1
Bob Barnes	2	0	0	0	19.29	1
John Dobb	2	0	0	0	9.00	2
Lum Davenport	1	0	0	0	0.00	0
Webb Schultz	1	0	0	0	9.00	0
Bob Lawrence	1	0	0	0	9.00	1

== Awards and honors ==
=== League top five finishers ===
Bibb Falk

- #3 in AL in batting average (.352)

Sloppy Thurston

- AL leader in earned runs allowed (123)
- AL leader in hits allowed (330)
- AL leader in home runs allowed (17)
- #3 in AL in wins (20)
