= 1925 Chicago White Sox season =

1925 Chicago White Sox
- League: American League
- Ballpark: Comiskey Park
- City: Chicago, Illinois
- Record: 79–75 (.513)
- League place: 5th
- Owners: Charles Comiskey
- Managers: Eddie Collins
- Radio: WMAQ (Hal Totten)

The 1925 Chicago White Sox season was a season in Major League Baseball. The team finished fifth in the American League with a record of 79–75, 18.5 games behind the pennant-winning Washington Senators.

== Regular season ==
=== Season standings ===
American League
Team	W	L	Pct.	GB	Home	Road
Washington Senators	96	55	.636	—	53‍–‍22	43‍–‍33
Philadelphia Athletics	88	64	.579	8½	51‍–‍26	37‍–‍38
St. Louis Browns	82	71	.536	15	45‍–‍32	37‍–‍39
Detroit Tigers	81	73	.526	16½	43‍–‍34	38‍–‍39
Chicago White Sox	79	75	.513	18½	44‍–‍33	35‍–‍42
Cleveland Indians	70	84	.455	27½	37‍–‍39	33‍–‍45
New York Yankees	69	85	.448	28½	42‍–‍36	27‍–‍49
Boston Red Sox	47	105	.309	49½	28‍–‍47	19‍–‍58

=== Record vs. opponents ===
1925 American League record Sources:
Team	BOS	CWS	CLE	DET	NYY	PHA	SLB	WSH
Boston	—	9–13	7–15	5–17	9–13	5–17	5–16	7–14
Chicago	13–9	—	14–8	13–9	13–9	8–14	9–13	9–13
Cleveland	15–7	8–14	—	11–11–1	10–12	11–11	11–11	4–18
Detroit	17–5	9–13	11–11–1	—	14–8–1	8–14	12–10	10–12
New York	13–9	9–13	12–10	8–14–1	—	9–13	11–11–1	7–15
Philadelphia	17–5	14–8	11–11	14–8	13–9	—	12–10	7–13–1
St. Louis	16–5	13–9	11–11	10–12	11–11–1	10–12	—	11–11
Washington	14–7	13–9	18–4	12–10	15–7	13–7–1	11–11	—

=== Roster ===
1925 Chicago White Sox
Roster
Pitchers: Ken Ash; Chief Bender; Ted Blankenship; Sarge Connally; Mike Cvengros; Jim Joe Edwards; Red Faber; Jake Freeze; Dickey Kerr; Ted Lyons; Frank Mack; Leo Mangum; Tink Riviere; Charlie Robertson; Sloppy Thurston	Catchers: John Bischoff; Buck Crouse; Johnny Grabowski; Ray Schalk; Leo Tankersley; Infielders: Bill Barrett; Eddie Collins; Ike Davis; Willie Kamm; John Kane; Earl Sheely	Outfielders: Maurice Archdeacon; Roy Elsh; Bibb Falk; Spencer Harris; Harry Hooper; Jule Mallonee; Johnny Mostil; Other batters: Bud Clancy	Manager: Eddie Collins; Coaches: Billy Lauder

== Player stats ==
=== Batting ===
==== Starters by position ====
Note: Pos = Position; G = Games played; AB = At bats; H = Hits; Avg. = Batting average; HR = Home runs; RBI = Runs batted in

Pos	Player	G	AB	H	Avg.	HR	RBI
C	Ray Schalk	125	343	94	.274	0	52
1B	Earl Sheely	153	600	189	.315	9	111
2B	Eddie Collins	118	425	147	.346	3	80
SS	Ike Davis	146	562	135	.240	0	61
3B	Willie Kamm	152	509	142	.279	6	83
OF	Johnny Mostil	153	605	181	.299	2	50
OF	Harry Hooper	127	442	117	.265	6	55
OF	Bibb Falk	154	602	181	.301	4	99

==== Other batters ====
Note: G = Games played; AB = At bats; H = Hits; Avg. = Batting average; HR = Home runs; RBI = Runs batted in

Player	G	AB	H	Avg.	HR	RBI
Bill Barrett	81	245	89	.363	3	40
Buck Crouse	54	131	46	.351	2	25
Spence Harris	56	92	26	.283	1	13
John Kane	14	56	10	.179	0	3
Roy Elsh	32	48	9	.188	0	4
Johnny Grabowski	21	46	14	.304	0	10
John Bischoff	7	11	1	.091	0	0
Maurice Archdeacon	10	9	1	.111	0	0
Bud Clancy	4	3	0	.000	0	0
Jule Mallonee	2	3	0	.000	0	0
Leo Tankersley	1	3	0	.000	0	0

=== Pitching ===
==== Starting pitchers ====
Note: G = Games pitched; IP = Innings pitched; W = Wins; L = Losses; ERA = Earned run average; SO = Strikeouts

Player	G	IP	W	L	ERA	SO
Ted Lyons	43	262.2	21	11	3.26	45
Red Faber	34	238.0	12	11	3.78	71
Ted Blankenship	40	232.0	17	8	3.03	81
Sloppy Thurston	36	183.0	10	14	5.95	35
Charlie Robertson	24	137.0	8	12	5.26	27

==== Other pitchers ====
Note: G = Games pitched; IP = Innings pitched; W = Wins; L = Losses; ERA = Earned run average; SO = Strikeouts

Player	G	IP	W	L	ERA	SO
Mike Cvengros	22	104.2	3	9	4.30	32
Jim Joe Edwards	9	45.1	1	2	3.97	20
Dickey Kerr	12	36.2	0	1	5.15	4

==== Relief pitchers ====
Note: G = Games pitched; W = Wins; L = Losses; SV = Saves; ERA = Earned run average; SO = Strikeouts

Player	G	W	L	SV	ERA	SO
Sarge Connally	40	6	7	8	4.64	45
Frank Mack	8	0	0	0	9.45	6
Leo Mangum	7	1	0	0	7.80	6
Tink Riviere	3	0	0	0	13.50	1
Ken Ash	2	0	0	0	9.00	0
Jake Freeze	2	0	0	0	2.45	1
Chief Bender	1	0	0	0	18.00	0
