= 1924 Cleveland Indians season =

1924 Cleveland Indians
- League: American League
- Ballpark: Dunn Field
- City: Cleveland, Ohio
- Owners: Estate of Jim Dunn
- Managers: Tris Speaker

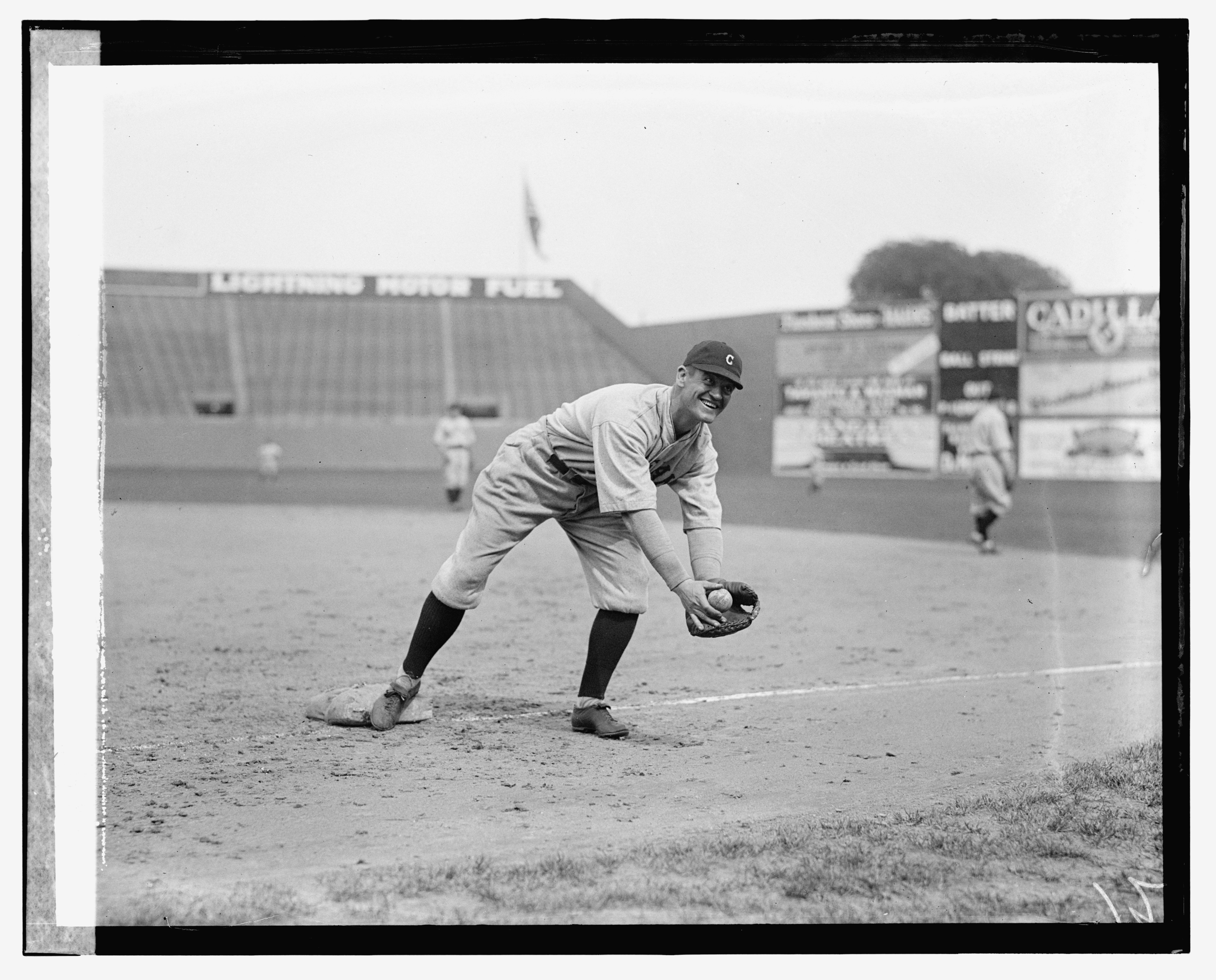

The 1924 Cleveland Indians season was a season in American baseball. The team finished sixth in the American League with a record of 67–86, 24 1/2 games behind the Washington Senators.

== Regular season ==
=== Season standings ===
American League
| Team | W | L | Pct. | GB | Home | Road |
|---|---|---|---|---|---|---|
| Washington Senators | 92 | 62 | .597 | — | 47‍–‍30 | 45‍–‍32 |
| New York Yankees | 89 | 63 | .586 | 2 | 45‍–‍32 | 44‍–‍31 |
| Detroit Tigers | 86 | 68 | .558 | 6 | 45‍–‍33 | 41‍–‍35 |
| St. Louis Browns | 74 | 78 | .487 | 17 | 41‍–‍36 | 33‍–‍42 |
| Philadelphia Athletics | 71 | 81 | .467 | 20 | 36‍–‍39 | 35‍–‍42 |
| Cleveland Indians | 67 | 86 | .438 | 24½ | 37‍–‍38 | 30‍–‍48 |
| Boston Red Sox | 67 | 87 | .435 | 25 | 41‍–‍36 | 26‍–‍51 |
| Chicago White Sox | 66 | 87 | .431 | 25½ | 37‍–‍39 | 29‍–‍48 |

=== Record vs. opponents ===
1924 American League record Sources:
| Team | BOS | CWS | CLE | DET | NYY | PHA | SLB | WSH |
|---|---|---|---|---|---|---|---|---|
| Boston | — | 10–12 | 14–8 | 6–16 | 5–17–1 | 12–10 | 11–11–1 | 9–13–1 |
| Chicago | 12–10 | — | 11–11 | 8–14–1 | 6–16 | 11–11 | 13–8 | 5–17 |
| Cleveland | 8–14 | 11–11 | — | 7–15 | 8–14 | 11–11 | 11–10 | 11–11 |
| Detroit | 16–6 | 14–8–1 | 15–7 | — | 13–9 | 11–11 | 9–13 | 8–14–1 |
| New York | 17–5–1 | 16–6 | 14–8 | 9–13 | — | 12–8 | 12–10 | 9–13 |
| Philadelphia | 10–12 | 11–11 | 11–11 | 11–11 | 8–12 | — | 13–9 | 7–15 |
| St. Louis | 11–11–1 | 8–13 | 10–11 | 13–9 | 10–12 | 9–13 | — | 13–9 |
| Washington | 13–9–1 | 17–5 | 11–11 | 14–8–1 | 13–9 | 15–7 | 9–13 | — |

=== Roster ===
1924 Cleveland Indians
Roster
| Pitchers: Virgil Cheeves; Watty Clark; Stan Coveleski; Joe Dawson; Logan Drake; George Edmondson; Jim Joe Edwards; Paul Fitzke; Bub Kuhn; Dutch Levsen; Jim Lindsey; Bud Messenger; Dewey Metivier; Jake Miller; Guy Morton; Luther Roy; Joe Shaute; Sherry Smith; George Uhle; Frank Wayenberg; Carl Yowell | Catchers: Glenn Myatt; Luke Sewell; Roxy Walters; Infielders: Frank Brower; George Burns; Frank Ellerbe; Chick Fewster; Larry Gardner; Ray Knode; Rube Lutzke; Joe Sewell; Freddy Spurgeon; Riggs Stephenson; Elmer Yoter | Outfielders: Sumpter Clarke; Tom Gulley; Charlie Jamieson; Pat McNulty; Tris Speaker; Homer Summa; Joe Wyatt; Other batters: Kenny Hogan | Manager: Tris Speaker; Coaches: Jack McCallister; Frank Roth |

== Player stats ==
=== Batting ===
==== Starters by position ====
Note: Pos = Position; G = Games played; AB = At bats; H = Hits; Avg. = Batting average; HR = Home runs; RBI = Runs batted in

| Pos | Player | G | AB | H | Avg. | HR | RBI |
|---|---|---|---|---|---|---|---|
| C | Glenn Myatt | 105 | 342 | 117 | .342 | 8 | 73 |
| 1B | George Burns | 129 | 469 | 143 | .310 | 4 | 68 |
| 2B | Chick Fewster | 101 | 322 | 86 | .267 | 0 | 36 |
| SS | Joe Sewell | 153 | 594 | 188 | .316 | 4 | 106 |
| 3B | Rube Lutzke | 106 | 341 | 83 | .243 | 0 | 42 |
| OF | Tris Speaker | 135 | 486 | 167 | .344 | 9 | 65 |
| OF | Homer Summa | 111 | 390 | 113 | .290 | 2 | 38 |
| OF | Charlie Jamieson | 143 | 594 | 213 | .359 | 3 | 54 |

==== Other batters ====
Note: G = Games played; AB = At bats; H = Hits; Avg. = Batting average; HR = Home runs; RBI = Runs batted in

| Player | G | AB | H | Avg. | HR | RBI |
|---|---|---|---|---|---|---|
| Pat McNulty | 101 | 291 | 78 | .268 | 0 | 26 |
| Riggs Stephenson | 71 | 240 | 89 | .371 | 4 | 44 |
| Luke Sewell | 63 | 165 | 48 | .291 | 0 | 17 |
| Frank Ellerbe | 46 | 120 | 31 | .258 | 1 | 14 |
| Frank Brower | 66 | 107 | 30 | .280 | 3 | 20 |
| Sumpter Clarke | 35 | 104 | 24 | .231 | 0 | 11 |
| Roxy Walters | 32 | 74 | 19 | .257 | 0 | 5 |
| Elmer Yoter | 19 | 66 | 18 | .273 | 0 | 7 |
| Larry Gardner | 38 | 50 | 10 | .200 | 0 | 4 |
| Ray Knode | 11 | 37 | 9 | .243 | 0 | 4 |
| Tom Gulley | 8 | 20 | 3 | .150 | 0 | 1 |
| Joe Wyatt | 4 | 12 | 2 | .167 | 0 | 1 |
| Freddy Spurgeon | 3 | 7 | 1 | .143 | 0 | 0 |
| Kenny Hogan | 2 | 1 | 0 | .000 | 0 | 0 |

=== Pitching ===
==== Starting pitchers ====
Note: G = Games pitched; IP = Innings pitched; W = Wins; L = Losses; ERA = Earned run average; SO = Strikeouts

| Player | G | IP | W | L | ERA | SO |
|---|---|---|---|---|---|---|
| Joe Shaute | 46 | 283.0 | 20 | 17 | 3.75 | 68 |
| Sherry Smith | 39 | 247.2 | 12 | 14 | 3.02 | 34 |
| Stan Coveleski | 37 | 240.1 | 15 | 16 | 4.04 | 58 |
| George Uhle | 28 | 196.1 | 9 | 15 | 4.77 | 57 |
| Jim Joe Edwards | 10 | 57.0 | 4 | 3 | 2.84 | 15 |
| Joe Dawson | 4 | 20.1 | 1 | 2 | 6.64 | 7 |
| Jake Miller | 2 | 12.0 | 0 | 1 | 3.00 | 4 |

==== Other pitchers ====
Note: G = Games pitched; IP = Innings pitched; W = Wins; L = Losses; ERA = Earned run average; SO = Strikeouts

| Player | G | IP | W | L | ERA | SO |
|---|---|---|---|---|---|---|
| Dewey Metivier | 26 | 76.1 | 1 | 5 | 5.31 | 14 |
| Luther Roy | 16 | 48.2 | 0 | 5 | 7.77 | 14 |
| Carl Yowell | 4 | 27.0 | 1 | 1 | 6.67 | 8 |
| Bud Messenger | 5 | 25.0 | 2 | 0 | 4.32 | 4 |
| Virgil Cheeves | 8 | 17.1 | 0 | 0 | 7.79 | 2 |
| Dutch Levsen | 4 | 16.1 | 1 | 1 | 4.41 | 3 |
| Logan Drake | 5 | 11.1 | 0 | 1 | 10.32 | 8 |
| George Edmondson | 5 | 8.0 | 0 | 0 | 9.00 | 3 |
| Frank Wayenberg | 2 | 6.2 | 0 | 0 | 5.40 | 3 |

==== Relief pitchers ====
Note: G = Games pitched; W = Wins; L = Losses; SV = Saves; ERA = Earned run average; SO = Strikeouts

| Player | G | W | L | SV | ERA | SO |
|---|---|---|---|---|---|---|
| Watty Clark | 12 | 1 | 3 | 0 | 7.01 | 6 |
| Guy Morton | 10 | 0 | 1 | 0 | 6.57 | 6 |
| Frank Brower | 4 | 0 | 0 | 0 | 0.93 | 0 |
| Jim Lindsey | 3 | 0 | 0 | 0 | 21.00 | 0 |
| Paul Fitzke | 1 | 0 | 0 | 0 | 4.50 | 1 |
| Bub Kuhn | 1 | 0 | 1 | 0 | 27.00 | 0 |
