= 1919 Washington Senators season =

1919 Washington Senators
- League: American League
- Ballpark: National Park
- City: Washington, D.C.
- Record: 56–84 (.400)
- League place: 7th
- Owners: Thomas C. Noyes
- Managers: Clark Griffith

The 1919 Washington Senators won 56 games, lost 84, and finished in seventh place in the American League. They were managed by Clark Griffith and played home games at National Park.

== Regular season ==
=== Season standings ===
American League
Team	W	L	Pct.	GB	Home	Road
Chicago White Sox	88	52	.629	—	48‍–‍22	40‍–‍30
Cleveland Indians	84	55	.604	3½	44‍–‍25	40‍–‍30
New York Yankees	80	59	.576	7½	46‍–‍25	34‍–‍34
Detroit Tigers	80	60	.571	8	46‍–‍24	34‍–‍36
St. Louis Browns	67	72	.482	20½	40‍–‍30	27‍–‍42
Boston Red Sox	66	71	.482	20½	35‍–‍30	31‍–‍41
Washington Senators	56	84	.400	32	32‍–‍40	24‍–‍44
Philadelphia Athletics	36	104	.257	52	21‍–‍49	15‍–‍55

=== Record vs. opponents ===
1919 American League record Sources:
Team	BOS	CWS	CLE	DET	NYY	PHA	SLB	WSH
Boston	—	9–11	4–15	9–11	10–9	14–6	9–10–1	11–9
Chicago	11–9	—	12–8	11–9	12–8	17–3	11–9	14–6
Cleveland	15–4	8–12	—	8–12	13–7	16–4	11–9	13–7
Detroit	11–9	9–11	12–8	—	8–12	14–6	14–6	12–8
New York	9–10	8–12	7–13	12–8	—	18–2	12–8	14–6–2
Philadelphia	6–14	3–17	4–16	6–14	2–18	—	7–13	8–12
St. Louis	10–9–1	9–11	9–11	6–14	8–12	13–7	—	12–8
Washington	9–11	6–14	7–13	8–12	6–14–2	12–8	8–12	—

=== Notable transactions ===
- June 13, 1919: Harry Thompson was traded by the Senators to the Philadelphia Athletics for Roy Grover.

=== Roster ===
1919 Washington Senators
Roster
Pitchers: Nick Altrock; Doc Ayers; Harry Courtney; Molly Craft; Eric Erickson; Clarence Fisher; Ed Gill; Harry Harper; Ed Hovlik; Walter Johnson; Rip Jordan; Dick Robertson; Al Schacht; Jim Shaw; Bill Snyder; Harry Thompson; Charlie Whitehouse; Tom Zachary	Catchers: Sam Agnew; Patsy Gharrity; Val Picinich; Infielders: Jesse Baker; Claude Davidson; Ike Davis; Frank Ellerbe; Eddie Foster; Roy Grover; Bucky Harris; Hal Janvrin; Joe Judge; Joe Leonard; George McBride; Howie Shanks; Danny Silva	Outfielders: Mike Menosky; Clyde Milan; Buzz Murphy; Sam Rice; George Twombly; Other batters: Frank Kelliher	Manager: Clark Griffith

== Player stats ==
=== Batting ===
==== Starters by position ====
Note: Pos = Position; G = Games played; AB = At bats; H = Hits; Avg. = Batting average; HR = Home runs; RBI = Runs batted in

Pos	Player	G	AB	H	Avg.	HR	RBI
C	Val Picinich	80	212	58	.274	3	22
1B	Joe Judge	135	521	150	.288	2	31
2B	Hal Janvrin	61	208	37	.178	1	13
SS	Howie Shanks	135	491	122	.248	1	54
3B	Eddie Foster	120	478	126	.264	0	26
OF	Mike Menosky	116	342	98	.287	6	39
OF	Clyde Milan	88	321	92	.287	0	37
OF	Sam Rice	141	557	179	.321	3	71

==== Other batters ====
Note: G = Games played; AB = At bats; H = Hits; Avg. = Batting average; HR = Home runs; RBI = Runs batted in

Player	G	AB	H	Avg.	HR	RBI
Patsy Gharrity	111	347	94	.271	2	43
Buzz Murphy	79	252	66	.262	0	28
Joe Leonard	71	198	51	.258	2	20
Frank Ellerbe	28	105	29	.276	0	16
Sam Agnew	42	98	23	.235	0	10
Roy Grover	24	75	14	.187	0	7
George McBride	15	40	8	.200	0	4
Bucky Harris	8	28	6	.214	0	4
Ike Davis	8	14	0	.000	0	0
Claude Davidson	2	7	3	.429	0	0
George Twombly	1	4	0	.000	0	0
Danny Silva	1	4	1	.250	0	0
Frank Kelliher	1	1	0	.000	0	0
Jesse Baker	1	0	0	----	0	0

=== Pitching ===
==== Starting pitchers ====
Note: G = Games pitched; IP = Innings pitched; W = Wins; L = Losses; ERA = Earned run average; SO = Strikeouts

Player	G	IP	W	L	ERA	SO
Jim Shaw	45	306.2	17	17	2.73	128
Walter Johnson	39	290.1	20	14	1.49	147
Harry Harper	35	208.0	6	21	3.72	87
Eric Erickson	20	132.0	6	11	3.95	86
Al Schacht	2	15.0	2	0	2.40	4
Rip Jordan	1	4.0	0	0	11.25	2

==== Other pitchers ====
Note: G = Games pitched; IP = Innings pitched; W = Wins; L = Losses; ERA = Earned run average; SO = Strikeouts

Player	G	IP	W	L	ERA	SO
Tom Zachary	17	61.2	1	5	2.92	9
Doc Ayers	11	43.2	0	6	2.89	12
Harry Thompson	12	43.1	0	3	3.53	10
Dick Robertson	7	27.2	0	1	2.28	7
Harry Courtney	4	26.1	3	0	2.73	6
Charlie Whitehouse	6	12.0	0	1	4.50	5
Bill Snyder	2	8.0	0	1	1.13	5

==== Relief pitchers ====
Note: G = Games pitched; W = Wins; L = Losses; SV = Saves; ERA = Earned run average; SO = Strikeouts

Player	G	W	L	SV	ERA	SO
Molly Craft	16	0	3	1	3.88	17
Ed Gill	16	1	1	0	4.82	7
Ed Hovlik	3	0	0	0	12.71	3
Clarence Fisher	2	0	0	0	13.50	1
Nick Altrock	1	0	0	0	inf	0
