= 1925 Cleveland Indians season =

1925 Cleveland Indians
- League: American League
- Ballpark: Dunn Field
- City: Cleveland, Ohio
- Owners: Estate of Jim Dunn
- Managers: Tris Speaker

The 1925 Cleveland Indians season was a season in American baseball. The team finished sixth in the American League with a record of 70–84, 27 1/2 games behind the Washington Senators.

== Regular season ==
- April 14, 1925: The Indians set a record for most runs scored by a team on Opening Day with 21. The Indians beat the St. Louis Browns, 21–14.

=== Season standings ===
American League
Team	W	L	Pct.	GB	Home	Road
Washington Senators	96	55	.636	—	53‍–‍22	43‍–‍33
Philadelphia Athletics	88	64	.579	8½	51‍–‍26	37‍–‍38
St. Louis Browns	82	71	.536	15	45‍–‍32	37‍–‍39
Detroit Tigers	81	73	.526	16½	43‍–‍34	38‍–‍39
Chicago White Sox	79	75	.513	18½	44‍–‍33	35‍–‍42
Cleveland Indians	70	84	.455	27½	37‍–‍39	33‍–‍45
New York Yankees	69	85	.448	28½	42‍–‍36	27‍–‍49
Boston Red Sox	47	105	.309	49½	28‍–‍47	19‍–‍58

=== Record vs. opponents ===
1925 American League record Sources:
Team	BOS	CWS	CLE	DET	NYY	PHA	SLB	WSH
Boston	—	9–13	7–15	5–17	9–13	5–17	5–16	7–14
Chicago	13–9	—	14–8	13–9	13–9	8–14	9–13	9–13
Cleveland	15–7	8–14	—	11–11–1	10–12	11–11	11–11	4–18
Detroit	17–5	9–13	11–11–1	—	14–8–1	8–14	12–10	10–12
New York	13–9	9–13	12–10	8–14–1	—	9–13	11–11–1	7–15
Philadelphia	17–5	14–8	11–11	14–8	13–9	—	12–10	7–13–1
St. Louis	16–5	13–9	11–11	10–12	11–11–1	10–12	—	11–11
Washington	14–7	13–9	18–4	12–10	15–7	13–7–1	11–11	—

=== Roster ===
1925 Cleveland Indians
Roster
Pitchers: Ray Benge; Garland Buckeye; Bert Cole; Jim Joe Edwards; Benn Karr; Dutch Levsen; Jake Miller; Luther Roy; Joe Shaute; Sherry Smith; By Speece; George Uhle; Carl Yowell	Catchers: Frank McCrea; Glenn Myatt; Luke Sewell; Roxy Walters; Infielders: Gene Bedford; George Burns; Chick Fewster; Harvey Hendrick; Johnny Hodapp; Joe Klugmann; Ray Knode; Rube Lutzke; Joe Sewell; Freddy Spurgeon; Chick Tolson; Dutch Ussat	Outfielders: Ike Eichrodt; Charlie Jamieson; Cliff Lee; Pat McNulty; Tris Speaker; Riggs Stephenson; Homer Summa	Manager: Tris Speaker; Coaches: Harry Mathews; Jack McCallister; Frank Roth

== Player stats ==
=== Batting ===
==== Starters by position ====
Note: Pos = Position; G = Games played; AB = At bats; H = Hits; Avg. = Batting average; HR = Home runs; RBI = Runs batted in

Pos	Player	G	AB	H	Avg.	HR	RBI
C	Glenn Myatt	106	358	97	.271	11	54
1B	George Burns	127	488	164	.336	6	79
2B	Chick Fewster	93	294	73	.248	1	38
SS	Joe Sewell	155	608	204	.336	1	98
3B	Rube Lutzke	81	238	52	.218	1	16
OF	Tris Speaker	117	429	167	.389	12	87
OF	Pat McNulty	118	373	117	.314	6	43
OF	Charlie Jamieson	138	557	165	.296	4	42

==== Other batters ====
Note: G = Games played; AB = At bats; H = Hits; Avg. = Batting average; HR = Home runs; RBI = Runs batted in

Player	G	AB	H	Avg.	HR	RBI
Freddy Spurgeon	107	376	108	.287	0	32
Cliff Lee	77	230	74	.322	4	42
Homer Summa	75	224	74	.330	0	25
Luke Sewell	74	220	51	.232	0	18
Johnny Hodapp	37	130	31	.238	0	14
Ray Knode	45	108	27	.250	0	11
Joe Klugmann	38	85	28	.329	0	12
Riggs Stephenson	19	54	16	.296	1	9
Ike Eichrodt	15	52	12	.231	0	4
Harvey Hendrick	25	28	8	.286	0	9
Roxy Walters	5	20	4	.200	0	0
Chick Tolson	3	12	3	.250	0	0
Frank McCrea	1	5	1	.200	0	0
Gene Bedford	2	3	0	.000	0	0
Dutch Ussat	1	1	0	.000	0	0

=== Pitching ===
==== Starting pitchers ====
Note: G = Games pitched; IP = Innings pitched; W = Wins; L = Losses; ERA = Earned run average; SO = Strikeouts

Player	G	IP	W	L	ERA	SO
Sherry Smith	31	237.0	11	14	4.86	30
George Uhle	29	210.2	13	11	4.10	68
Benn Karr	32	197.2	11	12	4.78	41
Jake Miller	32	190.1	10	13	3.31	51
Garland Buckeye	30	153.0	13	8	3.65	49
Joe Shaute	26	131.0	4	12	5.43	34
Dutch Levsen	4	24.1	1	2	5.55	9
Ray Benge	2	11.2	1	0	1.54	3

==== Other pitchers ====
Note: G = Games pitched; IP = Innings pitched; W = Wins; L = Losses; ERA = Earned run average; SO = Strikeouts

Player	G	IP	W	L	ERA	SO
Bert Cole	13	44.0	1	1	6.14	9
Carl Yowell	12	36.1	2	3	4.46	12
Jim Joe Edwards	13	36.0	0	3	8.25	12
Luther Roy	6	10.0	0	0	3.60	1

==== Relief pitchers ====
Note: G = Games pitched; W = Wins; L = Losses; SV = Saves; ERA = Earned run average; SO = Strikeouts

Player	G	W	L	SV	ERA	SO
By Speece	28	3	5	1	4.28	26
