= 1924 St. Louis Browns season =

Major League Baseball season

1924 St. Louis Browns
- League: American League
- Ballpark: Sportsman's Park
- City: St. Louis, Missouri
- Record: 74–78 (.487)
- League place: 4th
- Owners: Phil Ball
- Managers: George Sisler

The 1924 St. Louis Browns season involved the Browns finishing 4th in the American League with a record of 74 wins and 78 losses. This was George Sisler's first season as manager.

== Regular season ==
=== Season standings ===
American League
Team	W	L	Pct.	GB	Home	Road
Washington Senators	92	62	.597	—	47‍–‍30	45‍–‍32
New York Yankees	89	63	.586	2	45‍–‍32	44‍–‍31
Detroit Tigers	86	68	.558	6	45‍–‍33	41‍–‍35
St. Louis Browns	74	78	.487	17	41‍–‍36	33‍–‍42
Philadelphia Athletics	71	81	.467	20	36‍–‍39	35‍–‍42
Cleveland Indians	67	86	.438	24½	37‍–‍38	30‍–‍48
Boston Red Sox	67	87	.435	25	41‍–‍36	26‍–‍51
Chicago White Sox	66	87	.431	25½	37‍–‍39	29‍–‍48

=== Record vs. opponents ===
1924 American League record Sources:
Team	BOS	CWS	CLE	DET	NYY	PHA	SLB	WSH
Boston	—	10–12	14–8	6–16	5–17–1	12–10	11–11–1	9–13–1
Chicago	12–10	—	11–11	8–14–1	6–16	11–11	13–8	5–17
Cleveland	8–14	11–11	—	7–15	8–14	11–11	11–10	11–11
Detroit	16–6	14–8–1	15–7	—	13–9	11–11	9–13	8–14–1
New York	17–5–1	16–6	14–8	9–13	—	12–8	12–10	9–13
Philadelphia	10–12	11–11	11–11	11–11	8–12	—	13–9	7–15
St. Louis	11–11–1	8–13	10–11	13–9	10–12	9–13	—	13–9
Washington	13–9–1	17–5	11–11	14–8–1	13–9	15–7	9–13	—

=== Roster ===
1924 St. Louis Browns
Roster
Pitchers: Edgar Barnhart; Bill Bayne; Boom-Boom Beck; Dave Danforth; Dixie Davis; George Grant; Ray Kolp; Bill Lasley; George Lyons; Hub Pruett; Urban Shocker; Elam Vangilder; Ollie Voigt; Ernie Wingard	Catchers: Pat Collins; Tony Rego; Hank Severeid; Infielders: Pat Burke; Frank Ellerbe; Wally Gerber; Marty McManus; Norm McMillan; Harry Rice; Gene Robertson; Syl Simon; George Sisler	Outfielders: Herschel Bennett; Verdo Elmore; Joe Evans; Baby Doll Jacobson; Jack Tobin; Ken Williams; Other batters: Bill Mizeur	Manager: George Sisler

== Player stats ==
=== Batting ===
==== Starters by position ====
Note: Pos = Position; G = Games played; AB = At bats; H = Hits; Avg. = Batting average; HR = Home runs; RBI = Runs batted in

Pos	Player	G	AB	H	Avg.	HR	RBI
C	Hank Severeid	137	432	133	.308	4	48
1B	George Sisler	151	636	194	.305	9	74
2B	Marty McManus	123	442	147	.333	5	80
SS	Wally Gerber	148	496	135	.272	0	55
3B	Gene Robertson	121	439	140	.319	4	52
OF	Ken Williams	114	398	129	.324	18	84
OF	Jack Tobin	136	569	170	.299	2	48
OF	Baby Doll Jacobson	152	579	184	.318	19	97

==== Other batters ====
Note: G = Games played; AB = At bats; H = Hits; Avg. = Batting average; HR = Home runs; RBI = Runs batted in

Player	G	AB	H	Avg.	HR	RBI
Joe Evans	77	209	53	.254	0	19
Norm McMillan	76	201	56	.279	0	27
Herschel Bennett	41	94	31	.330	1	11
Harry Rice	54	93	26	.280	0	15
Frank Ellerbe	21	61	12	.197	0	2
Tony Rego	24	59	13	.220	0	5
Pat Collins	32	54	17	.315	1	11
Syl Simon	23	32	8	.250	0	6
Verdo Elmore	7	17	3	.176	0	0
Pat Burke	1	3	0	.000	0	1
Bill Mizeur	1	1	0	.000	0	0

=== Pitching ===
==== Starting pitchers ====
Note: G = Games pitched; IP = Innings pitched; W = Wins; L = Losses; ERA = Earned run average; SO = Strikeouts

Player	G	IP	W	L	ERA	SO
Urban Shocker	40	246.1	16	13	4.20	88
Dave Danforth	41	219.2	15	12	4.51	65
Ernie Wingard	36	218.0	13	12	3.51	23
Dixie Davis	29	160.1	11	13	4.10	45

==== Other pitchers ====
Note: G = Games pitched; IP = Innings pitched; W = Wins; L = Losses; ERA = Earned run average; SO = Strikeouts

Player	G	IP	W	L	ERA	SO
Elam Vangilder	43	145.1	5	10	5.64	49
Ray Kolp	25	96.2	5	7	5.68	29
George Lyons	26	77.2	3	2	5.21	25

==== Relief pitchers ====
Note: G = Games pitched; W = Wins; L = Losses; SV = Saves; ERA = Earned run average; SO = Strikeouts

Player	G	W	L	SV	ERA	SO
Hub Pruett	33	3	4	0	4.57	27
George Grant	22	1	2	0	6.31	11
Bill Bayne	22	1	3	0	4.44	20
Ollie Voigt	8	1	0	0	5.51	4
Bill Lasley	2	0	0	0	6.75	0
Boom-Boom Beck	1	0	0	0	0.00	0
Edgar Barnhart	1	0	0	0	0.00	0

== Awards and honors ==
=== League top five finishers ===
Urban Shocker

- #5 strikeouts (88)

Baby Doll Jacobson

- #3 home runs (19)
- #4 slugging percentage (.529)

Ken Williams

- #3 slugging percentage (.533)
- #4 home runs (18)
