= Leo Taylor (baseball) =

American baseball player (1901–1982)

- Pinch runner
- Born: May 13, 1901; Walla Walla, Washington
- Died: May 20, 1982 (aged 81); Seattle, Washington
- Batted: Right Threw: Right

MLB debut
- May 3, 1923, for the Chicago White Sox

Last MLB appearance
- May 3, 1923, for the Chicago White Sox

MLB statistics
- Games played: 1
- At bats: 0
- Stats at Baseball Reference

Teams
- Chicago White Sox (1923)

Leo Thomas Taylor (May 13, 1901 – May 20, 1982) was an American professional baseball player who appeared in one game for the Chicago White Sox of Major League Baseball in 1923. He was used as a pinch runner, and did not get an at bat.

== Biography ==
Taylor made his sole major league appearance with the Chicago White Sox. On May 3, 1923, the White Sox were hosting the St. Louis Browns. In the bottom of the eighth inning, with the Browns holding a 5–2 lead, Chicago starting pitcher Ted Blankenship was removed from the batting order and replaced by back-up catcher Roy Graham. Graham reached base on a hit by pitch from Browns pitcher Dave Danforth. Graham was then replaced by Taylor, who entered the game as a pinch runner. Danforth then proceeded to retire Harry Hooper, Hervey McClellan and Eddie Collins, leaving Taylor stranded at first base. For the top of the ninth inning, Taylor was replaced by Mike Cvengros, who entered the game to pitch. Chicago went on to lose the game, 6–3.

Baseball records for Taylor only list him as playing for one minor league team, the San Francisco Seals of the Pacific Coast League in 1926, when he appeared in 56 games (49 as a shortstop) with a .253 batting average. The Seals team that season featured former White Sox pitcher Dickie Kerr and future major league stars Dolph Camilli and Earl Averill. Newspaper reports from when Taylor joined the Seals, and several years later, mention him playing in the Pacific Northwest, apparently in semi-professional leagues.

Taylor died in Seattle at the age of 81 and was buried at Mount Pleasant Cemetery.
