= Kettle Wirts =

American baseball player (1897–1968)

- Catcher
- Born: October 30, 1897; Forks of the Cosumnes, California, U.S.
- Died: July 12, 1968 (aged 70); Sacramento, California, U.S.
- Batted: Right Threw: Right

MLB debut
- July 20, 1921, for the Chicago Cubs

Last MLB appearance
- July 2, 1924, for the Chicago White Sox

MLB statistics
- Batting average: .163
- Home runs: 1
- Runs batted in: 8
- Stats at Baseball Reference

Teams
- Chicago Cubs (1921–1923); Chicago White Sox (1924)

Elwood Vernon "Kettle" Wirts (October 30, 1897 – July 12, 1968) was an American professional baseball player who spent four seasons in Major League Baseball. In total, Wirts played 17 seasons in professional baseball, beginning his career in 1918 with the minor league Spokane Indians. Over his major league career, Wirts played for the Chicago Cubs and the Chicago White Sox and batted .163 with 14 hits, 2 doubles, 1 home run, and 8 RBIs in 49 games. Wirts also managed the Sacramento Senators for a part of the 1935 season.

== Early life ==
Wirts was born on October 30, 1897 (or 1898) in Forks of the Cosumnes, California. He was the son of James Ambros Wuertz and Mary Jane Simpson. Wirts played sandlot ball with future major leaguer Earl Kunz in Sacramento, California during his youth. Wirts attended Saint Mary's College of California.

== Professional career ==
=== Early minor league career ===
In 1918, Wirts played for the Class-B Spokane Indians along with Cy Neighbors, a former major league player. After a one-year hiatus from professional baseball, Wirts made his return in 1920 with the Class-B Calgary Broncos of the Western Canada League. He batted .335 that season, with 108 hits in 322 at bats. In 1921, Wirts split the season between the Class-A Dallas Submarines of the Texas League, and the Double-A Rochester Colts of the International League. With the Submarines, Wirts batted .213 with 17 hits, 4 doubles, and 1 triple in 34 games. With the Colts, he batted .354 with 4 doubles, 3 triples, and 1 home run in 28 games.

=== Chicago Cubs ===
Wirts made his major league debut with the Chicago Cubs on July 20. In that game, against the Philadelphia Phillies, Wirts did not get a hit in 2 at-bats. On July 26, in a game against the Brooklyn Robins, Wirts got his first major league hit. On the season, Wirts batted .182 with 2 hits, and 1 RBI in 7 games. He played five games at the catcher position and committed no errors in 16 total chances. In 1922, Wirts continued to play for the Cubs. He hit his first major league home run on June 27, against the Pittsburgh Pirates. That season, Wirts batted .172 with 10 hits, 2 doubles, 1 home run, 6 RBIs, and 12 bases on balls in 31 games. Defensively, Wirts played 27 games at the catcher position and committed 2 errors in 63 total chances. In his final season with the Cubs, 1923, Wirts got 1 hit in 5 at-bats. Behind the plate, Wirts caught a total of 3 games and committed no errors in 10 total chances.

=== Chicago White Sox ===
In 1924, Wirts spent his final season in the majors with the Chicago White Sox. He got his first hit with the White Sox on July 2, in a game that would turn out to be the final game of his major league career. On the season, he batted .083 with 1 hit in 12 at-bats. Behind the plate, Wirts caught a total of 5 games and committed no errors in 16 total chances.

=== Later career ===
On July 6, 1924, the Chicago White Sox traded Wirts and teammate Doug McWeeny to the Class-AA Minneapolis Millers of the American Association for Johnny Grabowski and Leo Mangum. Wirts finished out the 1924 season with Minneapolis and batted .271 with 48 hits, 11 doubles, 1 triple, and 4 home runs in 67 games. He also spent part of the 1924 season with the Class-A Beaumont Exporters and batted .321 with 59 hits, 9 doubles, 3 triples, and 2 home runs in 58 games. The next season, 1925, Wirts split the season between the Class-AA Minneapolis Millers, and the Class-A San Antonio Bears. With the Millers, Wirts batted .220 with 35 hits, 7 doubles, and 2 home runs in 60 games. In 41 games with the Bears, Wirts batted .243 with 26 hits, 8 doubles, 3 triples, and 1 home run in 41 games. In 1926, Wirts spent the entire season with the Class-A San Antonio Bears. On the season, he batted .309 with 125 hits, 25 doubles, 10 triples, and 7 home runs in 132 games. Wirts led the Bears in triples, and was second in home runs. Wirts split the 1927 season between Class-A San Antonio and the Class-AA Kansas City Blues. With San Antonio, Wirts batted .244 with 55 hits, 6 doubles, 5 triples, and 1 home run. In 9 games with Kansas City, Wirts batted .289 with 4 hits. The next season, 1928, he continued to play with the Class-AA Kansas City Blues. Wirts batted .244 with 24 runs, 44 hits, 4 doubles, and 1 home run in 71 games. In 1929 season, Wirts played in the Western League with the Class-A Omaha Crickets. That season, he batted .306 with 115 hits, 29 doubles, 6 triples, and 5 home runs.

==== Sacramento Senators ====
In 1930, Wirts began his tenure with the Class-AA Sacramento Senators Pacific Coast League. In his first season, he batted .249 with 76 hits, 9 doubles, 2 triples, and 2 home runs. The next season, 1931, Wirts batted .303 with 118 hits, 15 doubles, 3 triples, and 5 home runs. In 1932, Wirts played 85 games and batted .260 with 75 hits, 12 doubles, 2 triples, and 1 home run. Wirts would continue to catch for the Senators in 1933, and batted .261 with 77 hits, 10 doubles, and 3 home runs in 93 games. In 1934, Wirts would see his numbers dip compared to his previous seasons with the Senators. On the season, he batted .236 with 65 hits, 13 doubles, 4 triples, and 2 home runs in 97 games. In 1935, Wirts was handed the managerial duties, however, after poor performance, he was given his unconditional release. On the season, as a player-manager, he batted .310 with 9 hits, and 2 doubles in 10 games.

== Later life ==
Kettle was Director of a baseball school for young people aged 12 and above in the Sacramento, CA area. By 1960, the school had nearly 800 students. Kettle also worked for himself as a wine distributor, starting his own company "Wirths Distributing Co".
