= Wayenberg =

Wayenberg is a surname. Notable people with the surname include:

- Dirk Wayenberg (1955–2007), Belgian racing cyclist
- Frank Wayenberg (1898–1975), American baseball player
