= Jackie Gallagher (baseball) =

American baseball player (1902–1984)

John Laurence Gallagher (January 28, 1902 Providence, Rhode Island – September 10, 1984 Gladwyne, Pennsylvania) was a Major League Baseball outfielder who played for the Cleveland Indians for one season. He played for one game during the 1923 Cleveland Indians season on August 24, 1923. A single left Gallagher with a rare MLB career batting average of 1.000.
