= Ed Gill =

American baseball player (1895-1995)

- Pitcher
- Born: August 7, 1895; Somerville, Massachusetts, U.S.
- Died: October 10, 1995 (aged 100); Brockton, Massachusetts, U.S.
- Batted: Left Threw: Right

MLB debut
- July 5, 1919, for the Washington Senators

Last MLB appearance
- September 28, 1919, for the Washington Senators

MLB statistics
- Win–loss record: 1-1
- Earned run average: 4.82
- Strikeouts: 7
- Stats at Baseball Reference

Teams
- Washington Senators (1919)

Edward James Gill (August 7, 1895 – October 10, 1995) was an American professional baseball pitcher. He appeared in sixteen Major League Baseball games for the Washington Senators in 1919.

== Biography ==
A native of Somerville, Massachusetts, Gill played college baseball for Holy Cross from 1916 to 1919, where he was coached by Baseball Hall of Famer Jesse Burkett. In 1916 and 1917, he played summer baseball for the Hyannis town team in what is now the Cape Cod Baseball League. At Hyannis, he pitched a no-hit, no-run game where he did not allow a ball to be hit to the outfield.

In Gill's lone season in the big leagues, he started two games and appeared in 16 total for the Senators, tossing 37.1 innings, and posting a 1–1 record with a 4.82 ERA. He made eight plate appearances, earning one base on balls and no hits. His major league debut came on July 5, when he hurled a 1-2-3 inning of relief in Washington's 6–4 loss in the first game of a doubleheader with the New York Yankees at the Polo Grounds. Gill's lone major league victory September 3 against the Philadelphia Athletics at Shibe Park. Gill tossed the first five innings and gave up two runs on four hits. He gave way to Jim Shaw, who went the rest of the way on the mound, and the Senators' Hall of Fame outfielder Sam Rice went 3–for–4 with a double, stolen base and two runs scored in the Senators' 4–3 win.

Gill died in Brockton, Massachusetts in 1995 at the age of 100.
