= Danny Silva (baseball) =

American baseball player (1896–1974)

- Third baseman
- Born: October 5, 1896; Everett, Massachusetts, U.S.
- Died: April 4, 1974 (aged 77); Hyannis, Massachusetts, U.S.
- Batted: Right Threw: Right

MLB debut
- August 11, 1919, for the Washington Senators

Last MLB appearance
- August 11, 1919, for the Washington Senators

MLB statistics
- Games played: 1
- At bats: 4
- Hits: 1
- Stats at Baseball Reference

Teams
- Washington Senators (1919)

Daniel James Silva (October 5, 1896 – April 4, 1974) was an American professional baseball third-baseman. He played one game in Major League Baseball for the Washington Senators in 1919. He was an assistant coach of the Boston Celtics, and was the first modern-era commissioner of the Cape Cod Baseball League.

== Biography ==
A native of Everett, Massachusetts, Silva attended Muhlenberg College and served in World War I. Returning home from war, Silva pursued a career in professional baseball. He appeared in a single game at the major league level for the 1919 Washington Senators. On August 11 of that season, he played third base for the Senators at Griffith Stadium. The Senators' lineup that day featured Baseball Hall of Fame outfielder Sam Rice, and saw the team's Hall of Fame hurler Walter Johnson used as a late-inning pinch hitter. Silva had one hit in four at-bats, a single that came as part of Washington's three-run ninth inning rally. The Senators lost the game, 7–4, to the Chicago White Sox and Shoeless Joe Jackson, a team that would become notorious for the Black Sox Scandal that marred the season's World Series.

Silva split time in 1920 between the Albany Senators and Springfield Ponies of the Eastern League. He returned to Springfield in 1921, and played his final professional season in 1922 with Springfield and the Pittsfield Hillies.

Silva was a player-manager in the Cape Cod Baseball League (CCBL) from 1927 to 1932. He played for and managed Wareham in 1927, Osterville from 1928 to 1930, where he led the team to the 1928 league title, and Barnstable in 1931 and 1932. He became a longtime umpire in the CCBL, and was described as "a jocular soul behind the plate when he is umpiring. He moans out strikes and balls in a sort of hog-caller's bass with all appropriate trimmings." In the early 1960s when a knowledgeable and universally respected figure was needed to unify the newly-reorganized CCBL, Silva was chosen and served as the first commissioner of the league's modern era, a position he held from 1962 to 1968. Silva was inducted into the CCBL Hall of Fame as part of its inaugural class of 2000.

Silva taught physical education and coached in the Everett school system for 24 years, taking a hiatus during World War II to serve as a major in the United States Air Force. From 1946 to 1948, he was assistant coach of the Boston Celtics under head coach Honey Russell.

Silva died in Hyannis, Massachusetts in 1974 at age 77.
