= Bub Kuhn =

American baseball player (1899–1956)

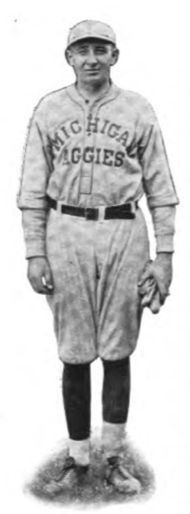
- Kuhn as a college baseball player, c. 1922
- Pitcher
- Born: Bernard Daniel Kuhn; October 12, 1899; Vicksburg, Michigan, US
- Died: November 20, 1956 (aged 57); Detroit, Michigan, US
- Batted: Left Threw: Right

MLB debut
- September 1, 1924, for the Cleveland Indians

Last MLB appearance
- September 1, 1924, for the Cleveland Indians

MLB statistics
- Win–loss record: 0–1
- Earned run average: 27.00
- Strikeouts: 0
- Stats at Baseball Reference

Teams
- Cleveland Indians (1924)

Bernard Daniel "Bub" Kuhn (October 12, 1899 – November 20, 1956) was a baseball pitcher who made a single appearance in Major League Baseball (MLB), playing one inning for the 1924 Cleveland Indians. Listed at 6 feet 1.5 inches (1.867 m) and 182 pounds (83 kg), he threw right-handed and batted left-handed.

== Biography ==
Kuhn was born in 1899 in Vicksburg, Michigan, and attended Michigan Agricultural College (now Michigan State University) where he played college baseball. In his senior season of 1923, he was the team captain.

Detail of Kuhn's minor league baseball career is lacking. He was signed by the Cleveland Indians organization in February 1924, at which time it was noted that he had been playing semi-pro baseball during the prior two years. He attended spring training with the Indians in Hot Springs, Arkansas, prior to the 1924 season. He played much of that season with the Utica Utes of the early New York–Pennsylvania League, compiling a 5–10 win–loss record in 19 games. He then pitched in five games for the Terre Haute Tots in August, registering a 1–3 record. He was transferred to the major league Indians on August 26. (Note: Through games of August 25, Cleveland had a record of 56–66 and were 14 games behind the league-leading New York Yankees and Washington Senators.)

Line score from Kuhn's only major league appearance

On September 1, 1924, Kuhn made his only major league appearance, pitching for Cleveland against the St. Louis Browns in an away game played at Sportsman's Park. Kuhn entered the first game of a doubleheader in the bottom of the eighth inning, with the score tied, 8–8. Cleveland's prior pitcher, reliever Paul Fitzke, had allowed two runs in four innings of work, in what was also Fitzke's only major league appearance. The first batter that Kuhn faced, future hall of famer George Sisler, reached base on an infield single, and the next batter, left fielder Ken Williams, hit a home run. This was followed by a single, sacrifice bunt, single (scoring another run), fly out, and then a ground out to end the inning. Overall, in his one inning of work, Kuhn had faced seven batters and allowed three runs on four hits. As the Indians were unable to score in the top of the ninth inning, Kuhn was the losing pitcher for Cleveland.

It does not appear that Kuhn continued his professional baseball career beyond 1924, as in March 1925 he was back at Michigan Agricultural College, where he would be helping to mentor the team's pitchers. In 1926, he was pitching in a local Michigan league, against opponents such as a team from the Fisher Body company. In 1928, he took a job as a farms crop specialist in Marquette, Michigan; at that time, it was noted that he had been teaching agriculture for three years at the high school in St. Johns, Michigan. (Note: St. Johns, Michigan, is located approximately 20 miles (32 km) north of East Lansing, Michigan, where Kuhn had attended college.)

Kuhn died in 1956 in Detroit, a week after undergoing surgery; he was interred in Lansing, Michigan. He had worked in agriculture since graduating from college, and had been a member of Michigan State's agricultural extension office since 1928. He had also spent two years doing research at the University of the Ryukyus in Japan. Kuhn was married and had one daughter.
