= Banner, Mississippi =

- Unincorporated community
- Location within Mississippi Location within the United States
- Coordinates: 34°05′19″N 89°23′05″W
- Country: United States
- State: Mississippi
- County: Calhoun
- Elevation: 344 ft (105 m)
- Time zone: UTC-6 (Central (CST))
  - Summer (DST): UTC-5 (CDT)
- ZIP code: 38913
- Area code: 662
- GNIS feature ID: 666507

Banner is an unincorporated community in Calhoun County, Mississippi, United States. Banner is located along Mississippi Highway 9W, 7 miles (11 km) north-northwest of Bruce.

== History ==
The population in 1900 was 114. Around that time, the settlement had a money order post office, two churches, and several stores.

A post office first began operation under the name Banner in 1850.

== Notable people ==
- Jim Joe Edwards, professional baseball player from 1922–1928.
- Ula B. Ross, member of the Mississippi House of Representatives from 1916 to 1920
