= John Happenny =

American baseball player (1901–1988)

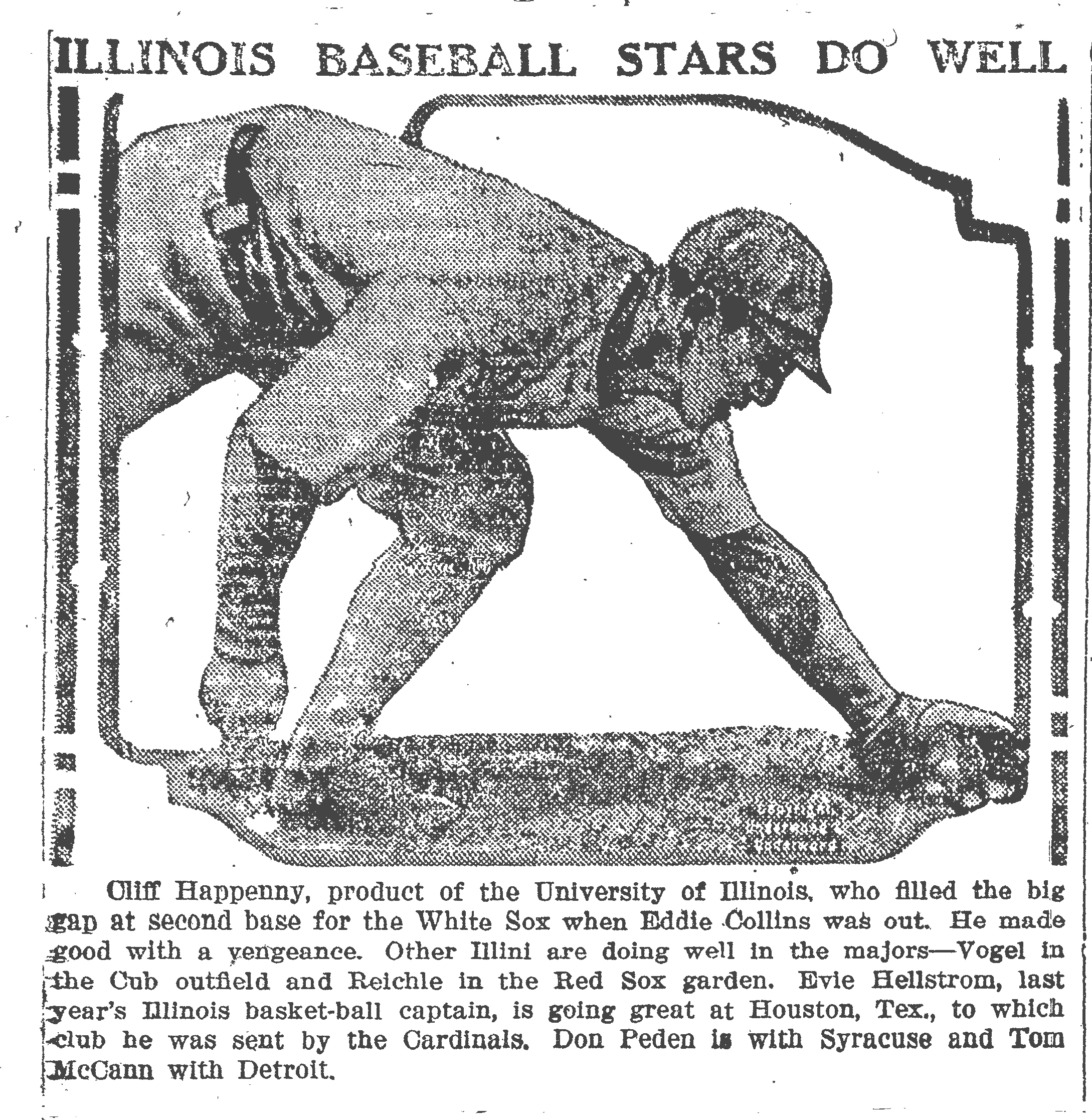
- Infielder
- Born: May 18, 1901; Waltham, Massachusetts, U.S.
- Died: December 29, 1988 (aged 87); Coral Springs, Florida, U.S.
- Batted: Right Threw: Right

MLB debut
- July 2, 1923, for the Chicago White Sox

Last MLB appearance
- October 6, 1923, for the Chicago White Sox

MLB statistics
- Batting average: .221
- Home runs: 0
- Runs batted in: 10
- Stats at Baseball Reference

Teams
- Chicago White Sox (1923)

John Clifford Happenny (May 18, 1901 – December 29, 1988) was an American infielder in Major League Baseball. He played for the Chicago White Sox.
