= Earl Kunz =

American baseball player (1898–1963)

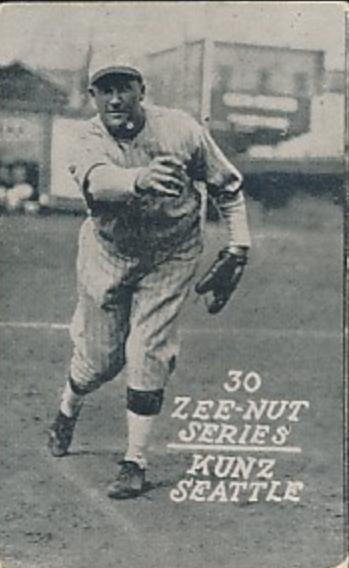
- Pitcher
- Born: December 25, 1898; Sacramento, California, U.S.
- Died: April 14, 1963 (aged 64); Sacramento, California, U.S.
- Batted: Right Threw: Right

MLB debut
- April 19, 1923, for the Pittsburgh Pirates

Last MLB appearance
- July 30, 1923, for the Pittsburgh Pirates

MLB statistics
- Win–loss record: 1–2
- Earned run average: 5.52
- Strikeouts: 12
- Stats at Baseball Reference

Teams
- Pittsburgh Pirates (1923)

Earl Dewey Kunz (December 25, 1898 – April 14, 1963), nicknamed "Pinches", was a professional baseball pitcher who spent one season in Major League Baseball. In total, Kunz spent 13 season in professional baseball, the majority of those in the Pacific Coast League.

== Early life ==
Kunz was born in Sacramento, California on December 25, 1898. Kunz was nicknamed "Pinches" and "Pinch." As a kid, he played sandlot ball with future major leaguer Kettle Wirts.

== Professional career ==
=== Sacramento Senators ===
In 1920, Kunz began his professional career with the Sacramento Senators. That season, he went 3–11 with a 4.78 earned run average (ERA) in 39 games. His second season, Kunz went 14–12 with a 3.79 ERA in 50 games. He led all Senators pitchers in games played (50), and was second in bases on balls (walks) allowed (103).
