= Red Proctor =

American baseball player (1900–1954)

- Pitcher
- Born: October 27, 1900; Williamsburg, Virginia
- Died: December 17, 1954 (aged 54); Richmond, Virginia
- Batted: Right Threw: Right

MLB debut
- August 6, 1923, for the Chicago White Sox

Last MLB appearance
- August 9, 1923, for the Chicago White Sox

MLB statistics
- Games pitched: 2
- Earned run average: 13.50
- Innings pitched: 4.0
- Stats at Baseball Reference

Teams
- Chicago White Sox (1923)

Noah Richard "Red" Proctor (October 27, 1900 – December 17, 1954) was a Major League Baseball pitcher who played for the Chicago White Sox in 1923. He pitched in two games, pitching in 4.0 innings.
