= Jess Cortazzo =

American baseball player (1904–1963)

- Shortstop
- Born: September 26, 1904; Wilmerding, Pennsylvania, U.S.
- Died: March 4, 1963 (aged 58); Pittsburgh, Pennsylvania, U.S.
- Batted: Right Threw: Right

MLB debut
- September 1, 1923, for the Chicago White Sox

Last MLB appearance
- September 1, 1923, for the Chicago White Sox

MLB statistics
- Batting average: .000
- Home runs: 0
- Runs batted in: 0
- Stats at Baseball Reference

Teams
- Chicago White Sox (1923)

John Francis "Jess" Cortazzo (September 26, 1904 – March 4, 1963), also known as "Shine", was an American professional baseball player. He was a shortstop for one season (1923) with the Chicago White Sox. For his career, he appeared in one game and was retired in his only at bat.

He was born in Wilmerding, Pennsylvania and died in Pittsburgh, Pennsylvania at the age of 58.
