= Paul Fitzke =

American athlete and football coach (1900–1950)

- Pitcher
- Born: see note July 30, 1900; La Crosse, Wisconsin, U.S.
- Died: June 30, 1950 (aged 49); Sacramento, California, U.S.
- Batted: Right Threw: Right

MLB debut
- September 1, 1924, for the Cleveland Indians

Last MLB appearance
- September 1, 1924, for the Cleveland Indians

MLB statistics
- Win–loss record: 0–0
- Earned run average: 4.50
- Strikeouts: 1
- Stats at Baseball Reference

Teams
- Cleveland Indians (1924)

Paul Frederick Herman Fitzke (July 30, 1900 – June 30, 1950), also known as Bob Fitzke, was an American professional athlete, who played briefly as a pitcher in Major League Baseball (MLB) during 1924 and as a wingback in the National Football League (NFL) in 1925. He later was a college football head coach at the University of Dubuque.

== Biography ==
Fitzke was a three-sport athlete in college, competing in baseball and football for the University of Wyoming and later the University of Idaho; he also played basketball for Idaho.

=== Baseball ===
Fitzke played college baseball at Wyoming, where he batted .372 in 1921; he later played for Idaho. Fitzke went on to play minor league baseball for parts of 10 seasons during 1924–1943. He pitched in 168 minor league games, compiling a 41–48 win–loss record. He best season, statistically, was in 1926 with the Scranton Miners when he was 16–8 with a 2.74 earned run average (ERA). Listed at 5 feet 11.5 inches (1.816 m) and 185 pounds (84 kg), he threw and batted right-handed.

Line score from Fitzke's only major league appearance

Fitzke appeared in one major league game, with the 1924 Cleveland Indians. On September 1, 1924, Fitzke pitched in relief in the first game of a doubleheader against the St. Louis Browns. He entered the game to pitch in the bottom of the fourth inning, with the Browns leading, 6–2. In four innings of work, he faced 19 batters, allowing two runs on five hits and three walks, while striking out one batter (Browns shortstop Norm McMillan). Fitzke batted once during the game; he was called out on strikes in the sixth inning while facing Browns reliever Ray Kolp. Fitzke was removed in the top of the eighth inning when Glenn Myatt entered the game as a pinch hitter. Cleveland used pitcher Bub Kuhn to pitch the bottom of the eighth inning, taking the loss in what was also Kuhn's only major league appearance. Fitzke's earned run average (ERA) for his one major league appearance was 4.50.

=== Football ===
Fitzke played college football for Wyoming in 1921, before transferring to Idaho where he played two seasons. He played in the National Football League (NFL) for the Frankford Yellow Jackets in 1925, appearing in 16 games (13 starts). The NFL's website lists him as a wingback. Fitzke later coached college football for the Dubuque Spartans in Iowa in 1937 and 1938, and at Carbon College (now Utah State University Eastern) in Price, Utah, circa 1941.

== Personal life ==
Fitzke was born in La Crosse, Wisconsin, and graduated from high school there. After his sports career, he became a chiropractor in Sacramento, California. He died of leukemia in Sacramento on June 30, 1950, and was buried in Boise, Idaho.

Sources are inconsistent about what Fitzke's full name was. Pro-Football-Reference.com and the Society for American Baseball Research (SABR) list it as Paul Frederick Herman Fitzke. Retrosheet lists it as Robert Paul Fitzke né Frederick Herman Fitzke. The Associated Press news article about his death noted it was Paul Robert Fitzke. On draft registration cards, which he signed, it was listed as Paul Frederick Fitzke in March 1942, and as Paul Frederick Fietzke in September 1918.

== Head coaching record ==
College football

Year	Team	Overall	Conference	Standing	Bowl/playoffs
Dubuque Spartans (Iowa Intercollegiate Athletic Conference) (1937–1938)
1937	Dubuque	3–4–1	3–1–1	3rd	
1938	Dubuque	5–1–2	4–1	4th	
Dubuque:		8–5–3	7–2–1		
Total:		8–5–3			
