= Johnson Fry =

American baseball player (1901–1959)

- Pitcher
- Born: November 21, 1901; Huntington, West Virginia, U.S.
- Died: April 7, 1959 (aged 57); Carmi, Illinois, U.S.
- Batted: Right Threw: Right

MLB debut
- August 24, 1923, for the Cleveland Indians

Last MLB appearance
- August 24, 1923, for the Cleveland Indians

MLB statistics
- Win–loss record: 0–0
- Strikeouts: 0
- Earned run average: 12.27
- Stats at Baseball Reference

Teams
- Cleveland Indians (1923)

Johnson Fry (November 21, 1901 – April 7, 1959), nicknamed "Jay", was a professional baseball pitcher who played one game in Major League Baseball (MLB), during the 1923 season with the Cleveland Indians.

== Biography ==
Prior to his brief MLB career, Fry played amateur baseball in the Huntington City League in his hometown of Huntington, West Virginia. He was enrolled at Marshall University there, but he does appear to have played college baseball at Marshall.

During the 1923 Cleveland Indians season, Fry played in a 20–8 loss to the Washington Senators on August 24, 1923, at Dunn Field in Cleveland. He pitched 3 2/3 innings in relief, allowing five runs on six hits. A single in his only at-bat left him with a rare MLB career batting average of 1.000; he had a second plate appearance, which resulted in a hit by pitch.

After his brief baseball career, Fry worked as a deputy in the Cabell County sheriff's office. He was later convicted of embezzling funds from the sheriff's office, resulting in a prison sentence. After being paroled, he eventually worked in a welding shop as a foreman. Married twice, Fry died in 1959 and was buried in Spring Hill Cemetery in his hometown.

== See also ==
- List of baseball players who went directly to Major League Baseball
