= Ula B. Ross =

Mississippi politician

Member of the Mississippi House of Representatives from the Quitman County district
- In office January 1916 – January 1920

Personal details
- Born: March 3, 1869 Banner, Mississippi
- Party: Democrat

Ula Barksdale Ross was a Democratic member of the Mississippi House of Representatives, representing Quitman County, from 1916 to 1920.

== Biography ==
Ula Barksdale Ross was born in Banner, Mississippi, on March 3, 1869. He was the son of George Washington Ross and Sarah Catherine (Gedford) Ross. He attended the public schools of Calhoun County, Mississippi. He was in the real estate and insurance businesses, and was also a farmer. He was a marshal of Banner, Mississippi, and a mayor of Lambert, Mississippi. He represented Quitman County as a Democrat in the Mississippi House of Representatives from 1916 to 1920.

== Personal life ==
Ross married Myrtis McDowell Linder on 27 December 1887. They had three children: Herman Linder Ross, George Lee Ross, and Thelma Vance Ross.
