= George Lyons (baseball) =

American baseball player (1891–1981)

- Pitcher
- Born: January 25, 1891; Bible Grove, Illinois, US
- Died: August 12, 1981 (aged 90); Nevada, Missouri, US
- Batted: Right Threw: Right

MLB debut
- September 6, 1920, for the St. Louis Cardinals

Last MLB appearance
- September 23, 1924, for the St. Louis Browns

MLB statistics
- Win–loss record: 5–3
- Earned run average: 4.72
- Strikeouts: 30
- Stats at Baseball Reference

Teams
- St. Louis Cardinals (1920); St. Louis Browns (1924)

George Tony Lyons (January 25, 1891 – August 12, 1981) was an American professional baseball pitcher who played a total of 33 games in Major League Baseball (MLB) for the 1920 St. Louis Cardinals and the 1924 St. Louis Browns. Listed at 5 feet 11 inches (1.80 m) and 180 pounds (82 kg), he threw and batted right-handed.

== Biography ==
Nicknamed "Smooth", Lyons played minor league baseball from 1914 to 1928, except for 1916 when there is no record of him playing professionally. Lyons played only six games during the 1918 season, due to military service from May 1918 to January 1919. In 13 minor league seasons, he accrued a 124–163 win–loss record for seasons that records are available for.

Lyons' first major league stint came in September 1920 with the St. Louis Cardinals. His best outing was a complete game 4–2 win over the Philadelphia Phillies on September 22. With the Cardinals, Lyons pitched in seven games (two starts) registering a 2–1 record with a 3.09 earned run average (ERA) while striking out five batters in 23 1/3 innings pitched.

Lyons returned to the major leagues in 1924 with the St. Louis Browns, when he pitched in 26 games (six starts). He had two complete game wins in June; one an 11–4 win over the Boston Red Sox, the other a 10–2 win over the Philadelphia Athletics. His record with the Browns was 3–2 with a 5.21 ERA and 25 strikeouts in 77 2/3 innings pitched.

Lyons' major league pitching appearances yielded an overall 5–3 record with a 4.72 ERA in 33 games pitched. As a batter, he accrued a .222 batting average (6-for-27) with four RBIs. Defensively, he committed no errors in 39 total chances for a 1.000 fielding average.

Born in Bible Grove, Illinois, in 1891, Lyons served in the United States Army during World War I. He died at age 90 in Nevada, Missouri, and was interred there. The ballpark in the city of Nevada—used by the local high school and a M.I.N.K. Collegiate Baseball League team—is named Lyons Stadium in his honor.
