= Roxy Snipes =

American baseball player (1896–1941)

- Outfielder
- Born: October 28, 1896; Marion, South Carolina, U.S.
- Died: May 1, 1941 (aged 44); Fayetteville, North Carolina, U.S.
- Batted: Left Threw: Right

MLB debut
- July 15, 1923, for the Chicago White Sox

Last MLB appearance
- July 15, 1923, for the Chicago White Sox

MLB statistics
- Batting average: .000 (0-for-1)
- Home runs: 0
- Runs batted in: 0
- Stats at Baseball Reference

Teams
- Chicago White Sox (1923)

Wyatt Eure "Roxy" Snipes (October 28, 1896 – May 1, 1941) was a professional baseball outfielder. He appeared in one game for the 1923 Chicago White Sox of Major League Baseball (MLB). Listed at 6 feet 0 inches (1.83 m) and 185 pounds (84 kg), he batted left-handed and threw right-handed.

== Biography ==
Box score of Snipes' only major league appearance, as published in The News & Observer of Raleigh, North Carolina, on July 16, 1923

Snipes played in the minor leagues for three seasons—1923, 1925, and 1926—for teams in the Carolinas and Florida. His one major league appearance came for the Chicago White Sox on July 15, 1923. In a home game against the Philadelphia Athletics, he was hitless in one at bat, appearing as a pinch hitter for pitcher Red Faber in the eighth inning.

Snipes was born in Marion, South Carolina. He attended the University of South Carolina, where he played college baseball and college football. He served in the United States Navy during World War I, then returned to college and graduated with a law degree in 1924. Snipes worked as attorney and served in the South Carolina Senate representing Marion County. He died of pneumonia in Fayetteville, North Carolina, at the age of 44 in 1941.
