= Frank McCrea =

American baseball player (1896–1981)

- Catcher
- Born: September 6, 1896; Jersey City, New Jersey, U.S.
- Died: February 25, 1981 (aged 84); Dover, New Jersey, U.S.
- Batted: Right Threw: Right

MLB debut
- September 26, 1925, for the Cleveland Indians

Last MLB appearance
- September 26, 1925, for the Cleveland Indians

MLB statistics
- Games played: 1
- At bats: 5
- Hits: 1
- Stats at Baseball Reference

Teams
- Cleveland Indians (1925)

Francis William McCrea (September 6, 1896 – February 25, 1981) was an American Major League Baseball catcher from Jersey City, New Jersey who played for one season. He played in one game for the Cleveland Indians on September 26 during the 1925 Cleveland Indians season, earning one hit in five at-bats. He died in Dover, New Jersey.
