= Frank Wayenberg =

American baseball player (1898–1975)

- Pitcher
- Born: August 27, 1898; Franklin, Kansas
- Died: April 16, 1975 (aged 76); Zanesville, Ohio
- Batted: Left Threw: Left

MLB debut
- August 25, 1924, for the Cleveland Indians

Last MLB appearance
- August 28, 1924, for the Cleveland Indians

MLB statistics
- Earned run average: 5.40
- Win–loss record: 0-0
- Strikeouts: 3
- Stats at Baseball Reference

Teams
- Cleveland Indians (1924)

Frank Wayenberg (August 27, 1898 – April 16, 1975) was a Major League Baseball pitcher who played for one season. He pitched in two games for the Cleveland Indians during the 1924 Cleveland Indians season.
