= Kenny Hogan =

American baseball player (1902–1980)

- Center fielder
- Born: October 9, 1902; Cleveland, Ohio, U.S.
- Died: January 2, 1980 (aged 77); Cleveland, Ohio, U.S.
- Batted: Left Threw: Right

MLB debut
- October 2, 1921, for the Cincinnati Reds

Last MLB appearance
- May 30, 1924, for the Cleveland Indians

MLB statistics
- Games played: 4
- At bats: 3
- Hits: 0
- Stats at Baseball Reference

Teams
- Cincinnati Reds (1921); Cleveland Indians (1923–1924)

Kenneth Timothy Hogan (October 9, 1902 – January 2, 1980) was an American outfielder in Major League Baseball outfielder who played for the Cincinnati Reds (1921) and the Cleveland Indians (1923–1924).
