= Gene Bedford =

American baseball player (1896–1977)

- Second baseman
- Born: December 2, 1896; Dallas, Texas
- Died: October 6, 1977 (aged 80); San Antonio, Texas
- Batted: Switch Threw: Right

MLB debut
- June 25, 1925, for the Cleveland Indians

Last MLB appearance
- September 16, 1925, for the Cleveland Indians
- Stats at Baseball Reference

Teams
- Cleveland Indians (1925)

William Eugene Bedford (December 2, 1896 – October 6, 1977) was a second baseman for the Cleveland Indians and end for the Rochester Jeffersons. In two games with the Indians, he went 0-for-3 with a run scored.

== Sources ==
- Career statistics from Baseball Reference · Retrosheet · Baseball Almanac
- Career statistics from Pro Football Reference
