= Joe Burns (catcher) =

American baseball player (1900–1986)

- Catcher
- Born: February 25, 1900; Trenton, New Jersey
- Died: January 7, 1986 (aged 85); Trenton, New Jersey
- Batted: Right Threw: Right

MLB debut
- April 18, 1924, for the Chicago White Sox

Last MLB appearance
- June 13, 1924, for the Chicago White Sox

MLB statistics
- Games played: 8
- At bats: 19
- Hits: 2
- Stats at Baseball Reference

Teams
- Chicago White Sox (1924)

Joseph Francis Burns (February 25, 1900 – January 7, 1986) was an American Major League Baseball catcher who played for the Chicago White Sox in 1924.
