= Bob Barnes (baseball) =

American baseball player (1902–1993)

- Pitcher
- Born: January 6, 1902; Washburn, Illinois, U.S.
- Died: December 8, 1993 (aged 91); Peoria, Illinois, U.S.
- Batted: Left Threw: Left

MLB debut
- July 8, 1924, for the Chicago White Sox

Last MLB appearance
- July 10, 1924, for the Chicago White Sox

MLB statistics
- Win–loss record: 0–0
- Earned run average: 19.29
- Strikeouts: 1
- Stats at Baseball Reference

Teams
- Chicago White Sox (1924)

Robert Avery "Lefty" Barnes (January 6, 1902 – December 8, 1993) was an American Major League Baseball pitcher who played in two games for the Chicago White Sox in 1924.
