= Bill Lasley =

American baseball player (1902-1990)

- Pitcher
- Born: July 13, 1902; Gallipolis, Ohio, U.S.
- Died: August 21, 1990 (aged 88); Seattle, Washington, U.S.
- Batted: Right Threw: Right

MLB debut
- September 19, 1924, for the St. Louis Browns

Last MLB appearance
- September 23, 1924, for the St. Louis Browns

MLB statistics
- Win–loss record: 0–0
- Earned run average: 6.75
- Strikeouts: 0
- Stats at Baseball Reference

Teams
- St. Louis Browns (1924)

Willard Almond Lasley (July 13, 1902 – August 21, 1990) was an American Major League Baseball pitcher. Lasley played for the St. Louis Browns in 1924.
