= Milt Steengrafe =

American baseball player (1898–1977)

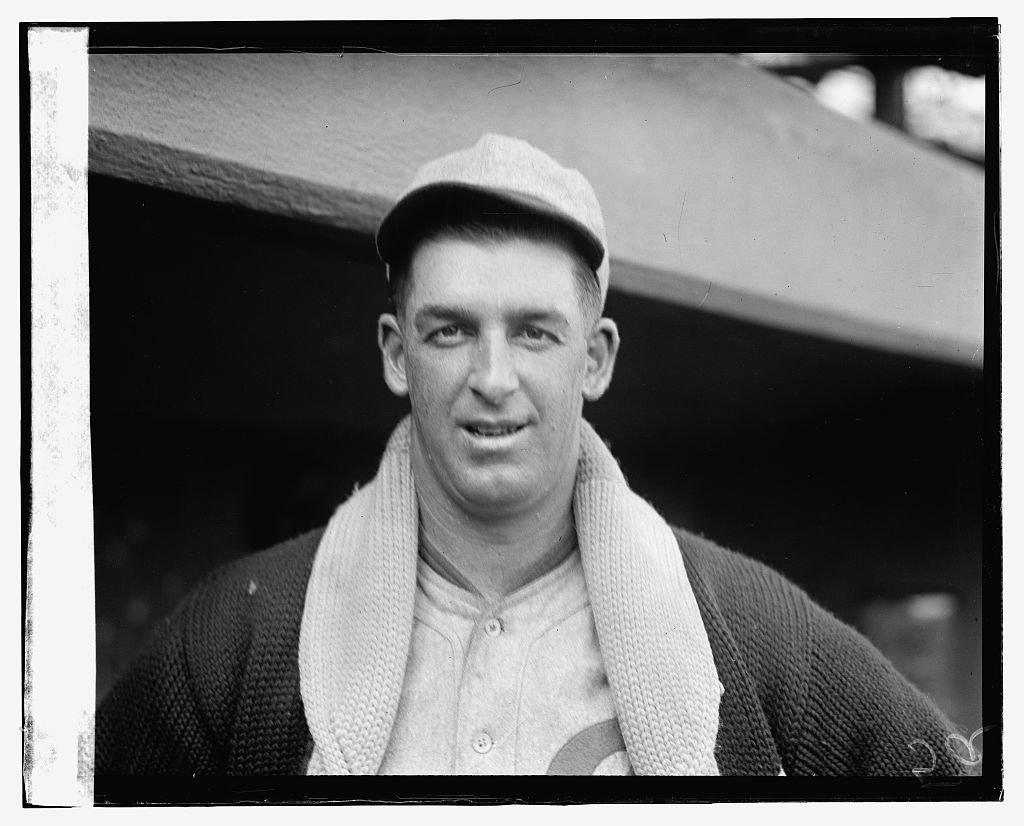
- Pitcher
- Born: April 26, 1898; San Francisco, California
- Died: June 2, 1977 (aged 79); Oklahoma City, Oklahoma
- Batted: Right Threw: Right

MLB debut
- May 5, 1924, for the Chicago White Sox

Last MLB appearance
- August 29, 1926, for the Chicago White Sox

MLB statistics
- Win–loss record: 1–1
- Earned run average: 5.11
- Strikeouts: 23
- Stats at Baseball Reference

Teams
- Chicago White Sox (1924, 1926)

Milton Henry Steengrafe (May 26, 1898 – June 2, 1977), was a Major League Baseball pitcher who played from 1924 and 1926 with the Chicago White Sox. He batted and threw right-handed. Steengrafe had a 1-1 record with a 5.11 ERA, in 16 career games, in his two-year career.

He was born in San Francisco, California and died in Oklahoma City, Oklahoma.
