= Ike Eichrodt =

American baseball player (1903–1965)

- Outfielder
- Born: January 6, 1903; Chicago, Illinois, U.S.
- Died: July 14, 1965 (aged 62); Indianapolis, Indiana, U.S.
- Batted: Right Threw: Right

MLB debut
- September 7, 1925, for the Cleveland Indians

Last MLB appearance
- June 23, 1931, for the Chicago White Sox

MLB statistics
- Batting average: .234
- Home runs: 0
- Runs batted in: 51
- Stats at Baseball Reference

Teams
- Cleveland Indians (1925–1927); Chicago White Sox (1931)

Frederick George "Ike" Eichrodt (January 6, 1903 – July 14, 1965) was an American Major League Baseball outfielder who played for four seasons. He played for the Cleveland Indians from 1925 to 1927 and the Chicago White Sox in 1931.
