= Jake Freeze =

American baseball player (1900–1983)

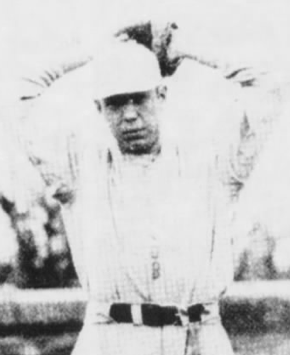
- Freeze, c. 1925
- Pitcher
- Born: April 25, 1900; Huntington, Arkansas, U.S.
- Died: April 9, 1983 (aged 82); San Angelo, Texas, U.S.
- Batted: Right Threw: Right

MLB debut
- July 1, 1925, for the Chicago White Sox

Last MLB appearance
- July 2, 1925, for the Chicago White Sox

MLB statistics
- Games played: 2
- Earned run average: 2.45
- Strikeouts: 1
- Stats at Baseball Reference

Teams
- Chicago White Sox (1925)

Carl Alexander "Jake" Freeze (April 25, 1900 – April 9, 1983) was a professional baseball pitcher who appeared in two games for the Chicago White Sox of Major League Baseball (MLB) in 1925. Listed at 5 feet 8 inches (1.73 m) and 150 pounds (68 kg), he threw and batted right-handed.

== Career ==
From 1923 through 1925, Freeze played college baseball for the Baylor Bears in Waco, Texas. In May 1923, with future Baseball Hall of Fame inductee Ted Lyons as a teammate, Freeze was the winning pitcher in a 5–3 victory over the Texas Longhorns that gave Baylor the Southwest Conference championship. In 1925, Freeze reportedly received offers from four major league teams; he joined the Chicago White Sox in June that year.

Both of Freeze's major league appearances were for the White Sox in road games against the St. Louis Browns at Sportsman's Park. On July 1, 1925, he pitched one inning, retiring all three batters he faced. The next day, he pitched 2 2/3 innings, allowing five hits and seven runs (one earned) while striking out one and walking three. During that game, he struck out in his only major league at bat as a hitter. Notable members of the White Sox at that time included Ted Lyons, Freeze's former teammate at Baylor, and other future Hall of Famers Red Faber, Harry Hooper, Ray Schalk, and player-manager Eddie Collins.

The White Sox released Freeze in mid-July 1925 to the minor league Little Rock Travelers of the Southern Association. While there are contemporary news accounts of him pitching for the Travelers—he had a losing record, but did pitch a two-hitter—Freeze's 1925 minor league statistics are absent from Baseball-Reference.com.

The Chicago Cubs organization acquired Freeze in May 1926. He played for the minor league Waco Cubs in the Texas League through the 1928 season, recording an overall record of 24–30 with 6.18 ERA. In 1929, Freeze's final year in professional baseball, he initially spent time with the Houston Buffaloes of the Texas League, who returned him to Waco, who then released him. Freeze went on to pitch in the Illinois–Indiana–Iowa League (also known as the Three–I League) for the Terre Haute Tots, where he had a 12–15 record with 4.38 ERA. Freeze had a .263 batting average in the minor leagues from 1926 to 1929.

Contemporary news reports mention Freeze pitching for the Abilene Oilers, a semi-pro team based in Abilene, Texas, in 1933. He later became an income tax specialist in San Angelo, Texas. Freeze was inducted to the Baylor Bears Hall of Fame in December 1979. He died on April 9, 1983, after a lengthy illness.
