= John Dobb =

American baseball player (1901–1991)

- Pitcher
- Born: November 15, 1901; Muskegon, Michigan, U.S.
- Died: July 31, 1991 (aged 89); Muskegon, Michigan, U.S.
- Batted: Right Threw: Left

MLB debut
- August 13, 1924, for the Chicago White Sox

Last MLB appearance
- August 30, 1924, for the Chicago White Sox

MLB statistics
- Win–loss record: 0-0
- Earned run average: 9.00
- Strikeouts: 2
- Stats at Baseball Reference

Teams
- Chicago White Sox (1924)

John Kenneth Dobb (November 15, 1901 – July 31, 1991), nicknamed "Lefty", was an American pitcher in Major League Baseball. He played for the Chicago White Sox in 1924.
