= Tom Gulley =

American baseball player (1899–1966)

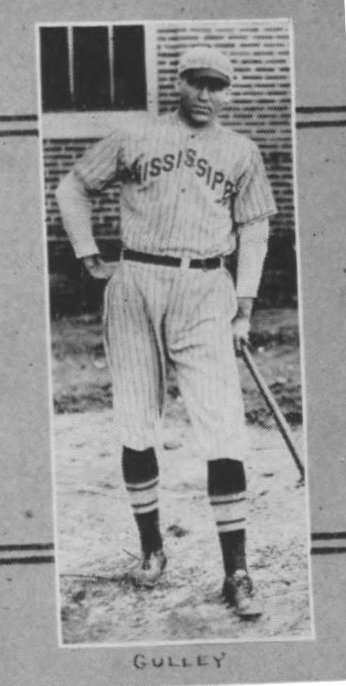
- First Base, Right Fielder, Pinch Hitter
- Born: December 25, 1899; Garner, North Carolina, US
- Died: November 24, 1966 (aged 66); St. Charles, Arkansas, US
- Batted: Left Threw: Right

MLB debut
- August 24, 1923, for the Cleveland Indians

Last MLB appearance
- May 22, 1926, for the Chicago White Sox

MLB statistics
- Batting average: .207
- Home runs: 0
- Runs batted in: 9
- Stats at Baseball Reference

Teams
- Cleveland Indians (1923–1924); Chicago White Sox (1926)

Thomas Jefferson Gulley (December 25, 1899 – November 24, 1966) was a professional baseball right fielder and pinch hitter. He was 5 ft 11 in (1.80 m) and weighed 178 pounds (81 kg). He went to Mississippi College. Gulley played first base for the Little Rock Travelers in the Southern Association for six seasons. He holds the Travelers' highest single-season batting average at .378 in 1925.

He made his major league debut with the Cleveland Indians on August 24, 1923 and remained with the Indians for the 1924 season. Over those two seasons Gulley played in five games. He did not play in the major leagues in 1925. Gulley joined the Chicago White Sox on April 13, 1926, playing in 12 games. Just over a month after joining the team he played his last major league game on May 22, 1926. He returned to the Travelers in 1927.

Gulley became sheriff of Pulaski County, Arkansas, in 1947 and served 12 years. While serving as Pulaski County sheriff, he organized Little Rock's Junior Deputy baseball program in 1947. It was the first youth league organization in the state. His work with the Junior Deputy program was recognized by the community as he was voted first place as the "Little Rockian of the Year" for 1948.

Gulley was sheriff during the events of the Little Rock Nine. He was elected Pulaski County Judge in 1966 but died before taking office.

On November 25, 1966, Gulley died of accidental drowning after his car rolled down a ramp while crossing a ferry. He was on a deer hunting trip near Saint Charles, Arkansas.

Gulley was inducted into the Arkansas Sports Hall of Fame in 1992.
