= George Grant (baseball) =

American baseball player (1903–1986)

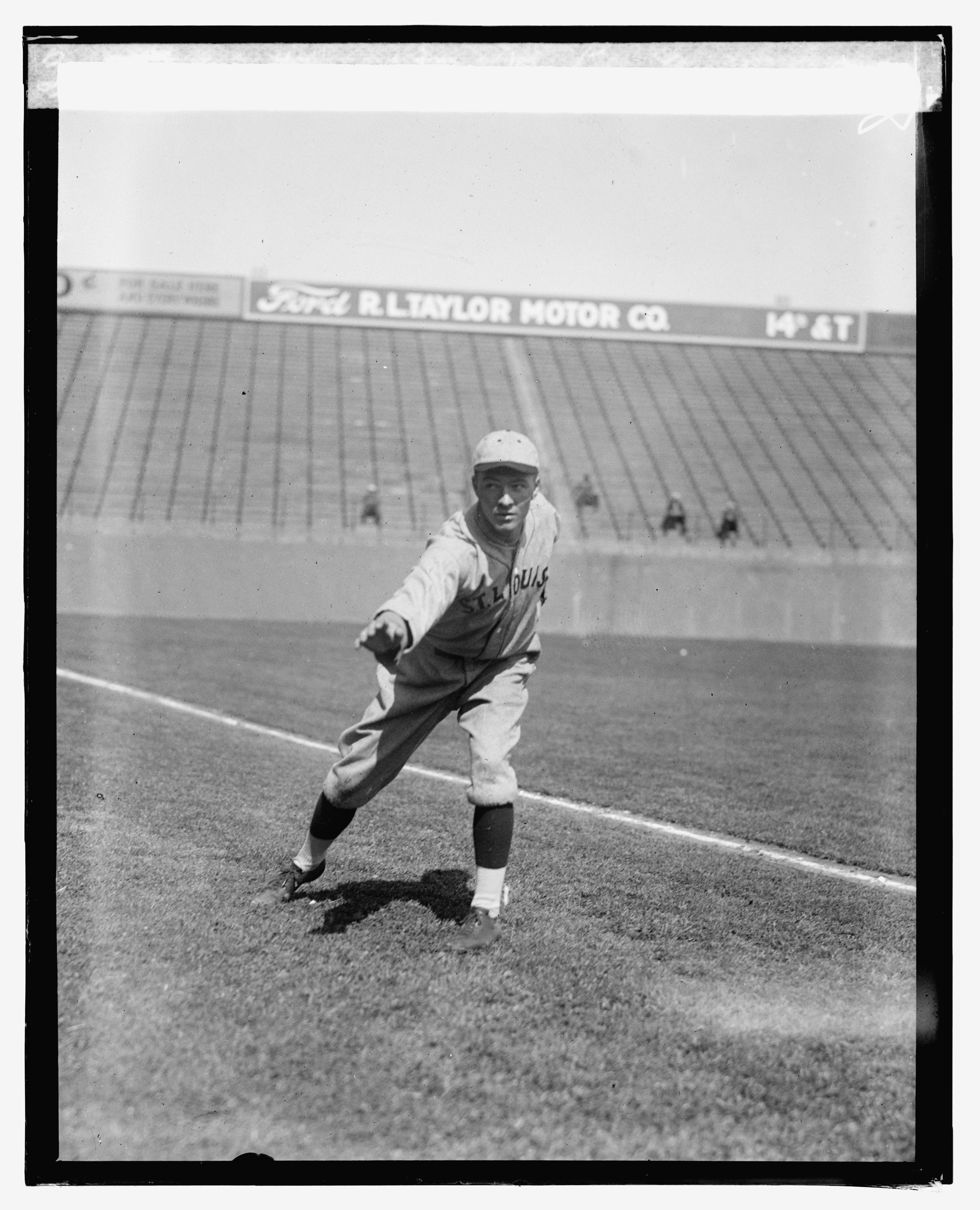
- Pitcher
- Born: January 6, 1903; East Tallassee, Alabama
- Died: March 25, 1986 (aged 83); Montgomery, Alabama
- Batted: Right Threw: Right

MLB debut
- September 17, 1923, for the St. Louis Browns

Last MLB appearance
- July 12, 1931, for the Pittsburgh Pirates

MLB statistics
- Win–loss record: 15–20
- Earned run average: 5.65
- Strikeouts: 89
- Stats at Baseball Reference

Teams
- St. Louis Browns (1923–1925); Cleveland Indians (1927–1929); Pittsburgh Pirates (1931)

George Addison Grant (January 6, 1903 – March 25, 1986) was a Major League Baseball pitcher who played for seven seasons. He played for the St. Louis Browns from 1923 to 1925, the Cleveland Indians from 1927 to 1929, and the Pittsburgh Pirates in 1931.
