= Leo Tankersley =

American baseball player (1901–1980)

- Catcher
- Born: June 8, 1901; Terrell, Texas, U.S.
- Died: September 18, 1980 (aged 79); Dallas, Texas, U.S.
- Batted: Right Threw: Right

MLB debut
- July 2, 1925, for the Chicago White Sox

Last MLB appearance
- July 2, 1925, for the Chicago White Sox

MLB statistics
- Games played: 1
- At bats: 3
- Hits: 0
- Stats at Baseball Reference

Teams
- Chicago White Sox (1925)

Lawrence William "Leo" Tankersley (June 8, 1901 – September 18, 1980) was an American catcher in Major League Baseball. Tankersley was 24 years old when he entered professional baseball. He played for the Chicago White Sox.
