= Edgar Barnhart =

American baseball player (1904-1984)

- Pitcher
- Born: September 16, 1904; Providence, Missouri
- Died: September 14, 1984 (aged 79); Columbia, Missouri
- Batted: Right Threw: Right

MLB debut
- September 23, 1924, for the St. Louis Browns

Last MLB appearance
- September 23, 1924, for the St. Louis Browns

MLB statistics
- Games: 1
- Innings pitched: 1.0
- Batters faced: 5
- Stats at Baseball Reference

Teams
- St. Louis Browns (1924)

Edgar Vernon Barnhart (September 16, 1904 – September 14, 1984) was an American professional baseball pitcher. Barnhart played in one game for the St. Louis Browns on September 23, 1924.
