= Frank Brower (baseball) =

American baseball player (1893–1960)

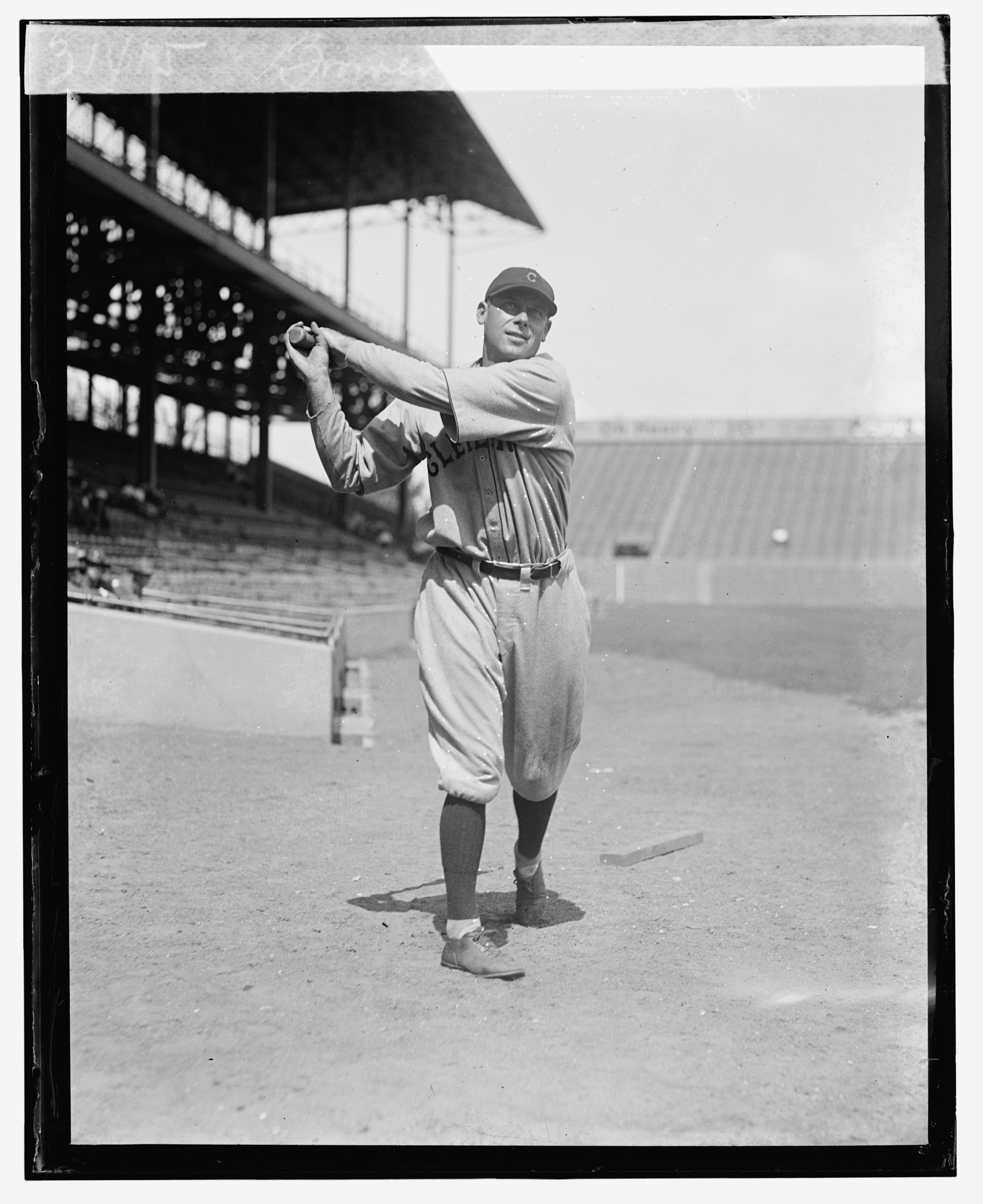
- Brower in 1924
- Right fielder / First baseman
- Born: March 26, 1893; Catharpin, Virginia, U.S.
- Died: November 20, 1960 (aged 67); Baltimore, Maryland, U.S.
- Batted: Left Threw: Right

MLB debut
- August 14, 1920, for the Washington Senators

Last MLB appearance
- September 24, 1924, for the Cleveland Indians

MLB statistics
- Batting average: .286
- Home runs: 30
- Runs batted in: 205
- Stats at Baseball Reference

Teams
- Washington Senators (1920–1922); Cleveland Indians (1923–1924)

Frank Willard "Turkey Foot" Brower (March 26, 1893 – November 20, 1960) was an American Major League Baseball outfielder and first baseman who played for five seasons. He played for the Washington Senators from 1920 to 1922 and the Cleveland Indians from 1923 to 1924.

Despite his short five year career in the big leagues, Brower proved to have a solid bat as well as a great arm. In 1923 with the Senators, he batted .293 with 9 home runs and 71 runs batted in. After being traded to the Indians just 8 days into 1923, Brower would go on to have another great season, hitting 16 home runs. In his final season of 1924, he would bat .280 in just 107 at bats, but also showed off his pitching abilities by appearing in four games out of the bullpen, allowing only one earned run over 9 2/3 innings of relief.

In 450 games over five seasons, Brower posted a .286 batting average (371-for-1297) with 206 runs, 30 home runs, 205 RBI, 168 bases on balls, .379 on-base percentage and a .443 slugging percentage.

Brower died on November 20, 1960 at Johns Hopkins University Hospital in Baltimore, Maryland at the age of 67. His body was interred in Sudlersville.

== See also ==
- List of Major League Baseball single-game hits leaders
