= Yeomet, California =

Former mining town in California, US

Coordinates: 38.5529°N 120.8475°W

Yeomet (also Saratoga and Forks of the Cosumnes) is a former settlement and mining town in Amador County, California, United States. It was located at the confluence of Middle and North Forks of the Cosumnes River, approximately one mile (1.6 km) north of Enterprise. The name, reportedly Native American in origin meaning "rocky falls", reflects the rapids upstream from the place. Other accounts place the namesake waterfalls downstream and claim yomet to mean "sounding rock" for the echoing effects there.

It was first settled by Edwin Beebee, John D. Morrison, and E. M. Simpson in 1850, and the three established and ran a trading post until 1859. There was a hotel and ferry to cross the Cosumnes, both operated by E. P. Bowman. A post office operated at Yeomet from 1854 to 1861. The settlement prospered with gold miners for a number of years before it faded.
