= Ollie Voigt =

American baseball player (1899-1970)

- Pitcher
- Born: January 29, 1899; Wheaton, Illinois, U.S.
- Died: April 7, 1970 (aged 71); Scottsdale, Arizona, U.S.
- Batted: Left Threw: Right

MLB debut
- April 19, 1924, for the St. Louis Browns

Last MLB appearance
- May 31, 1924, for the St. Louis Browns

MLB statistics
- Win–loss record: 1–0
- Earned run average: 5.51
- Strikeouts: 4
- Stats at Baseball Reference

Teams
- St. Louis Browns (1924)

Olen Edward "Ode" Voigt (January 29, 1899 – April 7, 1970) was an American pitcher in Major League Baseball. He was born in Wheaton, Illinois, and played baseball at Wheaton High School and the University of Illinois.

== Career ==
Voigt started his professional baseball career in 1919 with the Rockford Rox of the Illinois–Indiana–Iowa League. The following season, he went 17-17 on the mound with a 2.79 earned run average. He also led the league with 303 innings pitched.

In 1921, Voigt pitched well again and moved up to the class A Texas League, where he struggled. He improved the next season, though. In 1923, he set career-highs with 19 wins and 332 innings pitched and led his Denver Bears team in both categories. That performance earned him a roster spot on the major league St. Louis Browns in the spring of 1924.

Voigt appeared in eight major league games, including one start, and went 1-0 with a 5.51 ERA. His final game was on May 31, after which he returned to the Western League and won 12 games the rest of the year.

Voigt did not play in organized baseball after 1924. He died at the age of 71 in Scottsdale, Arizona.
