= Tink Riviere =

American baseball player (1899–1965)

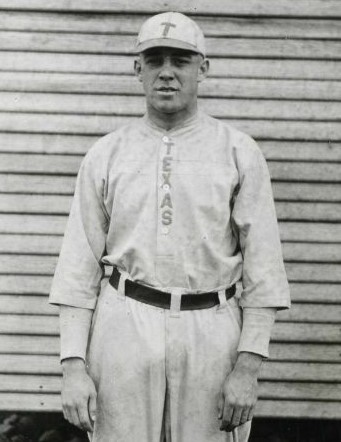
- Pitcher
- Born: August 2, 1899; Liberty, Texas, U.S.
- Died: September 27, 1965 (aged 66); Liberty, Texas, U.S.
- Batted: Right Threw: Right

MLB debut
- April 15, 1921, for the St. Louis Cardinals

Last MLB appearance
- July 16, 1925, for the Chicago White Sox

MLB statistics
- Win–loss record: 1–0
- Earned run average: 6.91
- Strikeouts: 16
- Stats at Baseball Reference

Teams
- St. Louis Cardinals (1921); Chicago White Sox (1925)

Arthur Bernard Riviere (August 2, 1899 – September 27, 1965) was an American Major League Baseball pitcher. He played for the St. Louis Cardinals in 1921 and the Chicago White Sox in 1925.
