= Harry Thompson (baseball) =

American baseball player (1889–1951)

- Pitcher
- Born: September 9, 1889; Nanticoke, Pennsylvania, U.S.
- Died: February 14, 1951 (aged 61); Reno, Nevada, U.S.
- Batted: Left Threw: Left

MLB debut
- April 24, 1919, for the Washington Senators

Last MLB appearance
- June 28, 1919, for the Philadelphia Athletics

MLB statistics
- Win–loss record: 0–4
- Earned run average: 4.23
- Strikeouts: 11
- Stats at Baseball Reference

Teams
- Washington Senators (1919); Philadelphia Athletics (1919)

Harold Thompson (September 9, 1889 – February 14, 1951) was an American Major League Baseball pitcher who played in 1919 with the Washington Senators and the Philadelphia Athletics.
