= Frank Naleway =

American baseball player (1902–1949)

- Shortstop
- Born: July 5, 1902; Chicago, Illinois
- Died: January 28, 1949 (aged 46); Chicago, Illinois
- Batted: Right Threw: Right

MLB debut
- September 16, 1924, for the Chicago White Sox

Last MLB appearance
- September 16, 1924, for the Chicago White Sox

MLB statistics
- Batting average: .000
- At bats: 2
- Hits: 0
- Stats at Baseball Reference

Teams
- Chicago White Sox (1924)

Frank Naleway (July 5, 1902 – January 28, 1949) nicknamed "Chick", was a Major League Baseball player for the Chicago White Sox in 1924. He played in just one game for the White Sox at shortstop, going 0-for-2 at the plate with one walk.

== Sources ==
- Career statistics from Baseball Reference, or Baseball Reference (Minors)
