= Clarence Fisher (baseball) =

American baseball player (1898–1965)

- Pitcher
- Born: August 27, 1898; Letart, West Virginia
- Died: November 2, 1965 (aged 67); Point Pleasant, West Virginia
- Batted: Right Threw: Right

MLB debut
- September 14, 1919, for the Washington Senators

Last MLB appearance
- October 3, 1920, for the Washington Senators

MLB statistics
- Win–loss record: 0-1
- Earned run average: 11.74
- Strikeouts: 1
- Stats at Baseball Reference

Teams
- Washington Senators (1919–1920)

Clarence Henry Fisher (August 27, 1898 – November 2, 1965) was a pitcher in Major League Baseball. He played for the Washington Senators.
