= Pat Burke (baseball) =

American baseball player (1901-1965)

- Third baseman
- Born: May 13, 1901; St. Louis, Missouri
- Died: July 7, 1965 (aged 64); St. Louis, Missouri
- Batted: Right Threw: Right

MLB debut
- September 23, 1924, for the St. Louis Browns

Last MLB appearance
- September 23, 1924, for the St. Louis Browns

MLB statistics
- Games: 1
- At bats: 3
- Hit(s): 0
- Stats at Baseball Reference

Teams
- St. Louis Browns (1924)

Patrick Edward Burke (May 13, 1901 – July 7, 1965) was a Major League Baseball third baseman who played in one game on September 23, 1924 with the St. Louis Browns. In that game, Burke pinch hit for regular third baseman Gene Robertson, and went 0–3 with a run batted in.
