= Frank Kelliher =

American baseball player (1899-1956)

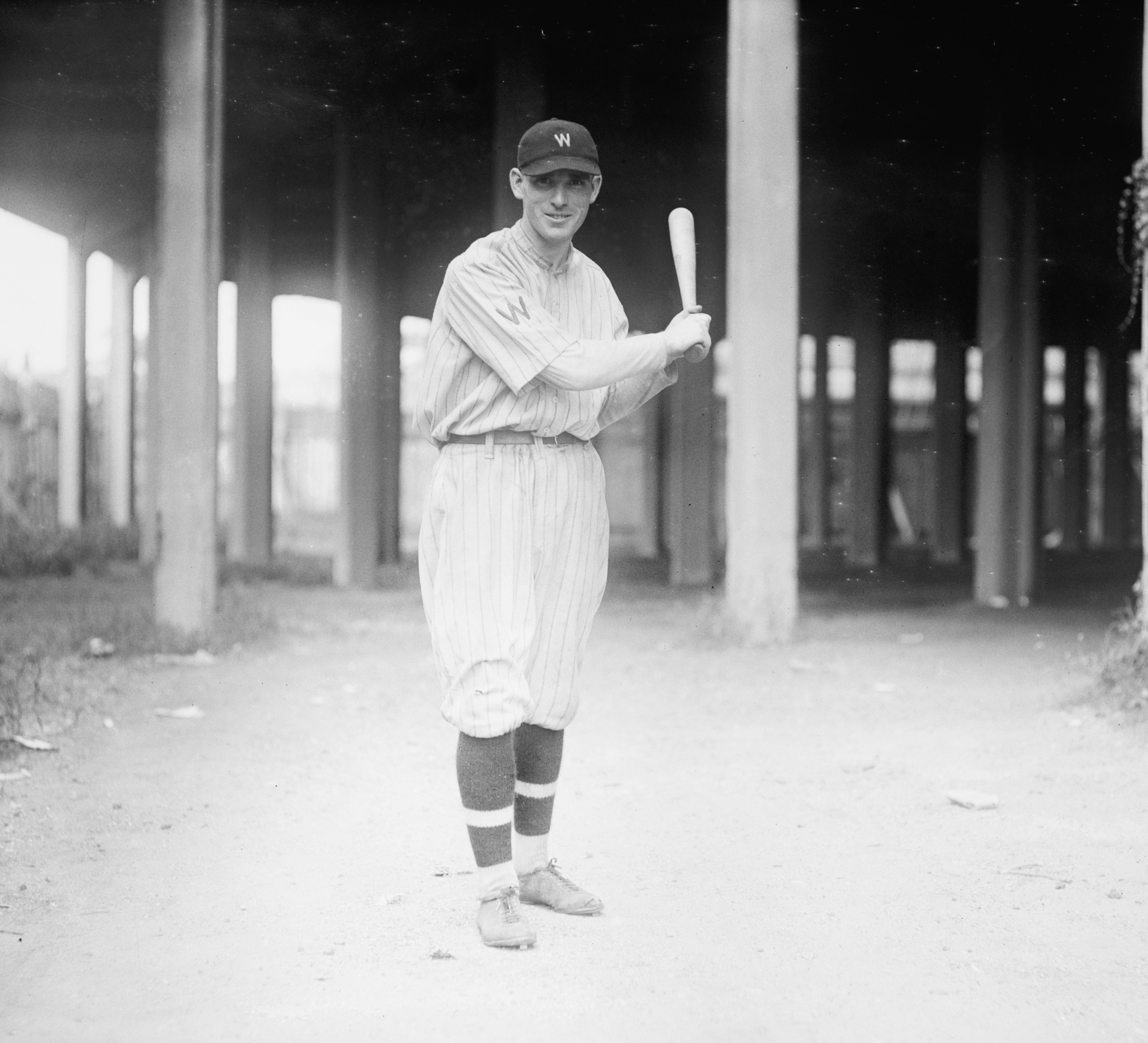
- Pinch hitter
- Born: May 23, 1899; Somerville, Massachusetts, U.S.
- Died: March 4, 1956 (aged 56); Somerville, Massachusetts, U.S.
- Batted: Right Threw: Right

MLB debut
- September 19, 1919, for the Washington Senators

Last MLB appearance
- September 19, 1919, for the Washington Senators

MLB statistics
- Games played: 1
- At bats: 1
- Hits: 0
- Stats at Baseball Reference

Teams
- Washington Senators (1919)

Francis Mortiford Kelliher (May 23, 1899 – March 4, 1956) was an American Major League Baseball player who pinch hit on one game for the Washington Senators on September 19, 1919. He went hitless in his only career at bat.
