= Joe Wyatt =

American baseball player (1900–1970)

- Outfielder
- Born: April 6, 1900; Petersburg, Indiana
- Died: December 5, 1970 (aged 70); Oblong, Illinois
- Batted: Right Threw: Right

MLB debut
- September 11, 1924, for the Cleveland Indians

Last MLB appearance
- September 13, 1924, for the Cleveland Indians

MLB statistics
- Batting average: .167
- Home runs: 0
- Runs batted in: 1
- Stats at Baseball Reference

Teams
- Cleveland Indians (1924)

Loral John Wyatt (April 6, 1900 – December 5, 1970) was a professional baseball player. He appeared in four games in Major League Baseball in 1924 for Cleveland Indians, all as a right fielder. During his brief major league career, he had two hits in 12 at-bats, with one run scored.

Wyatt was born in Petersburg, Indiana and died in Oblong, Illinois.
