= Jule Mallonee =

American baseball player (1900–1934)

- Outfielder
- Born: April 4, 1900; Charlotte, North Carolina
- Died: December 26, 1934 (aged 34); Charlotte, North Carolina
- Batted: Left Threw: Right

MLB debut
- August 4, 1925, for the Chicago White Sox

Last MLB appearance
- August 23, 1925, for the Chicago White Sox

MLB statistics
- Games played: 2
- At bats: 3
- Hits: 0
- Stats at Baseball Reference

Teams
- Chicago White Sox (1925)

Julius Norris Mallonee (April 4, 1900 – December 26, 1934) was an outfielder in Major League Baseball. He played for the Chicago White Sox in 1925.
