= Webb Schultz =

American baseball player (1898–1986)

- Pitcher
- Born: January 31, 1898; Wautoma, Wisconsin
- Died: July 26, 1986 (aged 88); Delavan, Wisconsin
- Batted: Right Threw: Right

MLB debut
- August 3, 1924, for the Chicago White Sox

Last MLB appearance
- August 3, 1924, for the Chicago White Sox

MLB statistics
- Games: 1
- Earned run average: 9.00
- Strikeouts: 0
- Stats at Baseball Reference

Teams
- Chicago White Sox (1924)

Wilbert Carl "Webb" Schultz (January 31, 1898 – July 26, 1986) was a Major League Baseball pitcher. Schultz played for the Chicago White Sox in 1924. In one career game, he had a 0–0 record, going one inning, and giving up one run and one hit. He batted and threw left-handed.

Schultz was born in Wautoma, Wisconsin and died in Delavan, Wisconsin.
