= Jesse Baker (shortstop) =

American baseball player (1895-1976)

- Shortstop
- Born: March 4, 1895; Cleveland, Ohio
- Died: July 29, 1976 (aged 81); West Los Angeles, California
- Batted: Right Threw: Right

MLB debut
- September 14, 1919, for the Washington Senators

Last MLB appearance
- September 14, 1919, for the Washington Senators

MLB statistics
- Games played: 1
- At bats: 0
- Hits: 0
- Stats at Baseball Reference

Teams
- Washington Senators (1919)

Jesse Baker (born Michael Myron Silverman, March 4, 1895 – July 29, 1976) was a professional baseball player who played shortstop in the Major Leagues in 1919 for the Washington Senators. In his only major league game, he was injured when Ty Cobb spiked him when he slid into second base.

He was born in Cleveland, Ohio and died in West Los Angeles, California, and was Jewish.
