= Roy Grover =

American baseball player

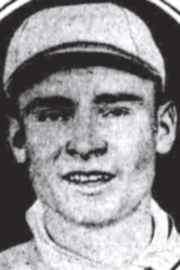
- Second baseman
- Born: January 17, 1892; Snohomish, Washington, U.S.
- Died: February 7, 1978 (aged 86); Milwaukie, Oregon, U.S.
- Batted: Right Threw: Right

MLB debut
- September 13, 1916, for the Philadelphia Athletics

Last MLB appearance
- July 5, 1919, for the Washington Senators

MLB statistics
- Batting average: .226
- Home runs: 0
- Runs batted in: 50
- Stats at Baseball Reference

Teams
- Philadelphia Athletics (1916–1917, 1919); Washington Senators (1919)

Roy Arthur Grover (January 17, 1892 – February 7, 1978) was an American Major League Baseball second baseman. He played all or part of three seasons in the majors, between 1916 and 1919, for the Philadelphia Athletics and Washington Senators.

In 1917, Grover was the Athletics' starting second baseman. That year, he set the all-time Athletics franchise record for sacrifice hits with 43, a record that still stands.

== Sources ==
- Career statistics from Baseball Reference · Baseball Reference (Minors) · Retrosheet · Baseball Almanac
