= Bill Black (second baseman) =

American baseball player (1899–1968)

- Second baseman
- Born: August 12, 1899; Philadelphia, Pennsylvania, U.S.
- Died: January 14, 1968 (aged 68); Philadelphia, Pennsylvania, U.S.
- Batted: Left Threw: Right

MLB debut
- May 4, 1924, for the Chicago White Sox

Last MLB appearance
- May 23, 1924, for the Chicago White Sox

MLB statistics
- Batting average: .200
- Home runs: 0
- Runs batted in: 0
- Stats at Baseball Reference

Teams
- Chicago White Sox (1924)

John William Black (August 12, 1899 – January 14, 1968) was an American professional baseball player. He was a second baseman for one season (1924) with the Chicago White Sox. For his career, he compiled a .200 batting average in 5 at-bats.

He was born and later died in Philadelphia, Pennsylvania, at the age of 68.
