= Luther Roy =

American baseball player (1902–1963)

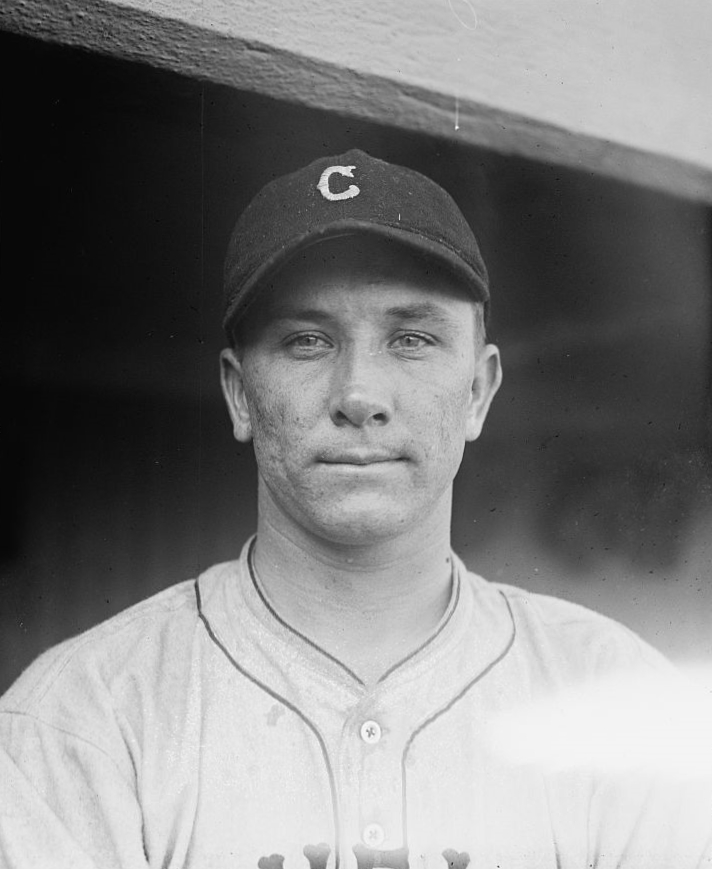
- Pitcher
- Born: July 29, 1902; Ooltewah, Tennessee, U.S.
- Died: July 24, 1963 (aged 60); Grand Rapids, Michigan, U.S.
- Batted: Right Threw: Right

MLB debut
- June 12, 1924, for the Cleveland Indians

Last MLB appearance
- October 5, 1929, for the Brooklyn Robins

MLB statistics
- Win–loss record: 6–12
- Earned run average: 7.17
- Strikeouts: 36
- Stats at Baseball Reference

Teams
- Cleveland Indians (1924–1925); Chicago Cubs (1927); Philadelphia Phillies (1929); Brooklyn Robins (1929)

Luther Franklin Roy (July 29, 1902 – July 24, 1963) was an American pitcher in Major League Baseball.

Roy was born in Ooltewah, Tennessee. He pitched from 1924 to 1929 with four different Major League teams.

Roy died in Grand Rapids, Michigan at age 60.
