= Carl Yowell =

American baseball player (1902–1985)

- Pitcher
- Born: December 20, 1902; Madison, Virginia
- Died: July 27, 1985 (aged 82); Jacksonville, Texas
- Batted: Left Threw: Left

MLB debut
- September 5, 1924, for the Cleveland Indians

Last MLB appearance
- October 1, 1925, for the Cleveland Indians

MLB statistics
- Earned run average: 5.40
- Win–loss record: 3-4
- Strikeouts: 20
- Stats at Baseball Reference

Teams
- Cleveland Indians (1924–1925)

Carl Columbus Yowell (December 20, 1902 – July 27, 1985) was a professional baseball pitcher. He played for two seasons in Major League Baseball for the Cleveland Indians in 1924–25.
