= Roy Elsh =

American baseball player (1891–1978)

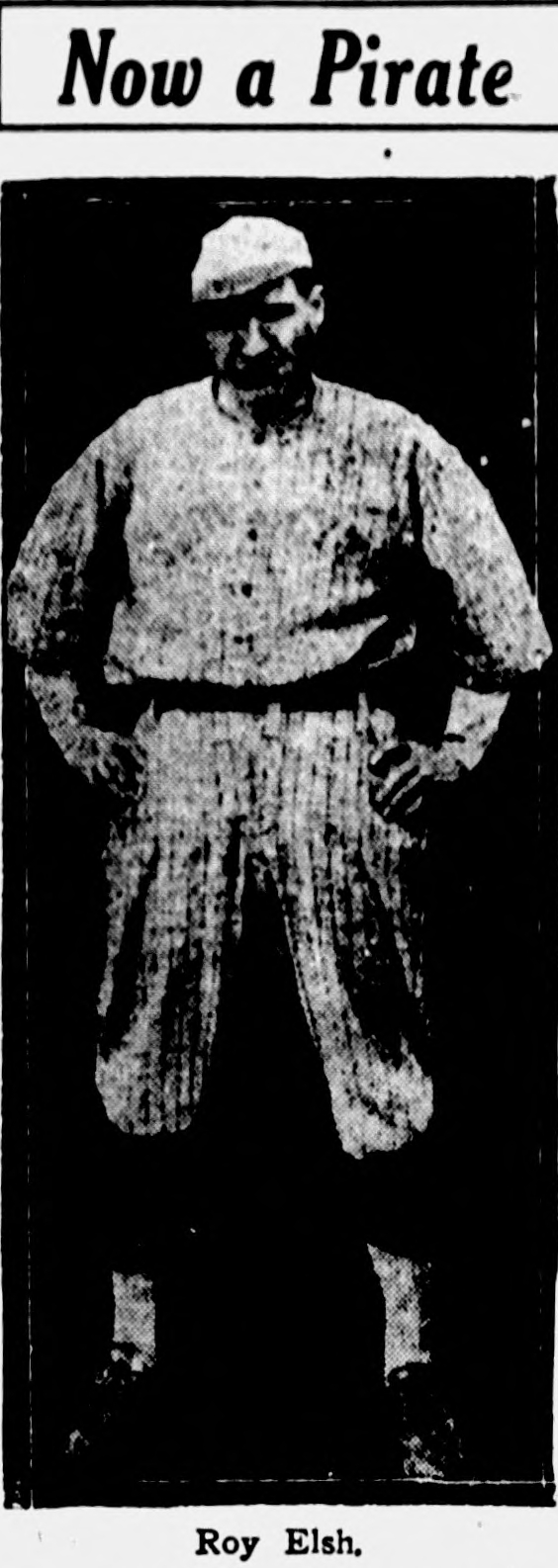
- Outfielder
- Born: March 1, 1891; Penns Grove, New Jersey
- Died: November 12, 1978 (aged 87); Philadelphia, Pennsylvania
- Batted: Right Threw: Right

MLB debut
- April 19, 1923, for the Chicago White Sox

Last MLB appearance
- October 4, 1925, for the Chicago White Sox

MLB statistics
- Batting average: .262
- Home runs: 0
- Runs batted in: 39
- Stats at Baseball Reference

Teams
- Chicago White Sox (1923–1925)

Eugene Raybold "Roy" Elsh (March 1, 1891 – November 12, 1978) was an outfielder in Major League Baseball. He played for the Chicago White Sox.

Born in Penns Grove, New Jersey, Elsh attended Penns Grove High School.
