= Ike Davis (shortstop) =

American baseball player (1895–1984)

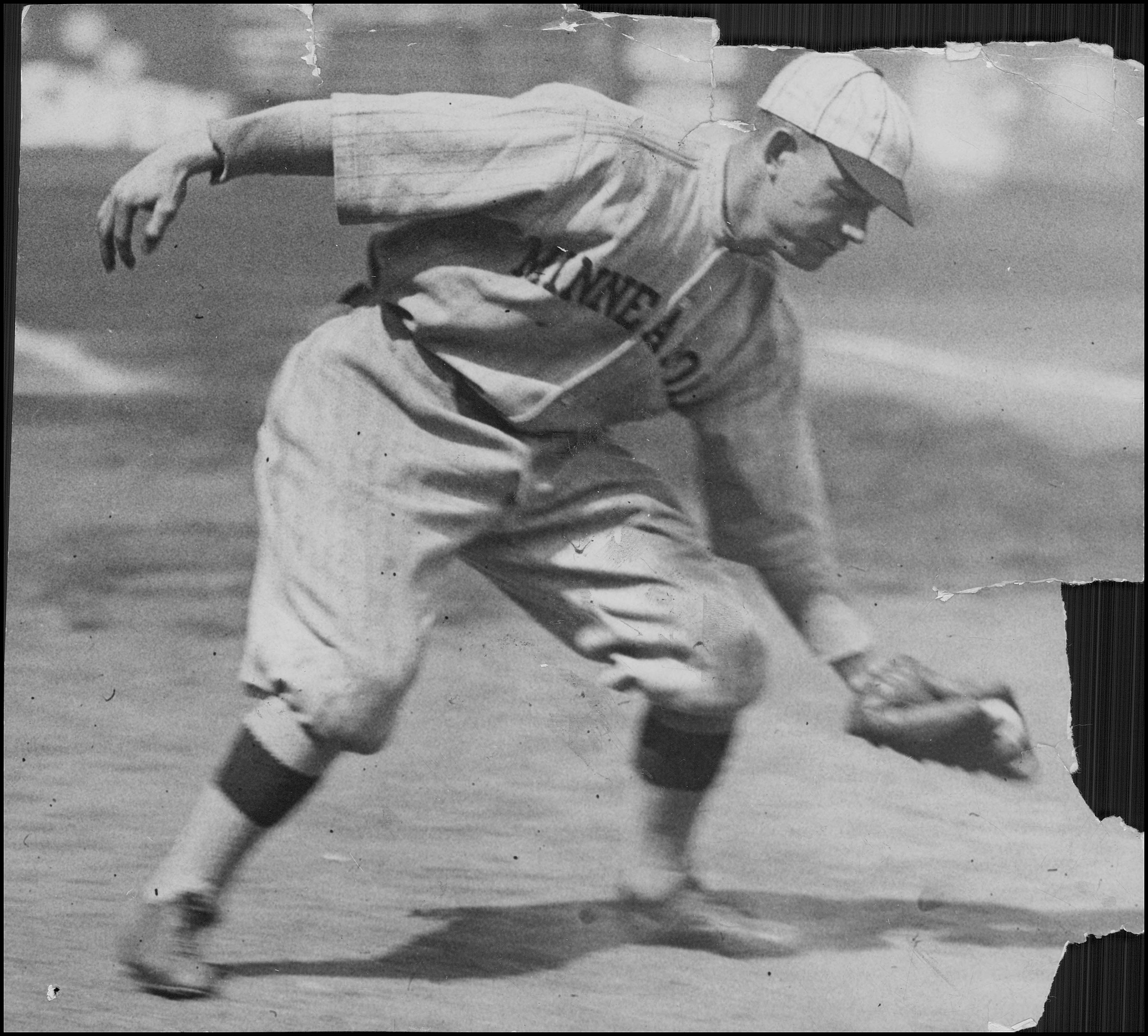
- Shortstop
- Born: June 14, 1895; Pueblo, Colorado, U.S.
- Died: April 2, 1984 (aged 88); Tucson, Arizona, U.S.
- Batted: Right Threw: Right

MLB debut
- April 23, 1919, for the Washington Senators

Last MLB appearance
- October 4, 1925, for the Chicago White Sox

MLB statistics
- Batting average: .235
- Home runs: 0
- Runs batted in: 65
- Stats at Baseball Reference

Teams
- Washington Senators (1919); Chicago White Sox (1924–25)

Isaac Marion Davis (June 14, 1895 – April 2, 1984) was an American Major League Baseball shortstop.

Davis played all or part of three seasons in the majors: 1919 for the Washington Senators, and 1924-1925 for the Chicago White Sox. He was the White Sox' starting shortstop in 1925, playing in 146 games and batting .240, but did he not play in the majors again. He was shipped to the Portland Beavers prior to the 1928 season as part of a trade for Bill Cissell.
