= Leo Mangum =

American baseball player (1896–1974)

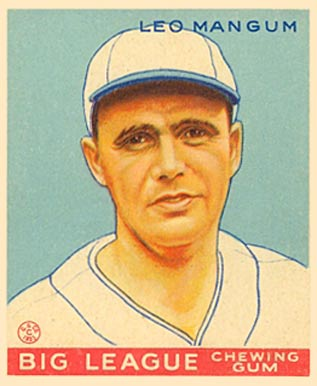
- Mangum 1933 Goudey baseball card
- Pitcher
- Born: May 24, 1896; Durham, North Carolina, U.S.
- Died: July 9, 1974 (aged 78); Lima, Ohio, U.S.
- Batted: Right Threw: Right

MLB debut
- July 11, 1924, for the Chicago White Sox

Last MLB appearance
- May 11, 1935, for the Boston Braves

MLB statistics
- Win–loss record: 11–10
- Earned run average: 5.37
- Strikeouts: 78
- Stats at Baseball Reference

Teams
- Chicago White Sox (1924–1925); New York Giants (1928); Boston Braves (1932–1935)

Leo Allan Mangum (May 24, 1896 – July 9, 1974) was an American professional baseball pitcher. He played all or part of seven seasons in Major League Baseball between 1924 and 1935 with the Chicago White Sox, New York Giants, and Boston Braves. He had a record of 11–10 in his career, pitching mostly in relief.

Mangum died of a stroke on July 9, 1974, at the age of 78.
