= Jim Joe Edwards =

American baseball player (1894–1965)

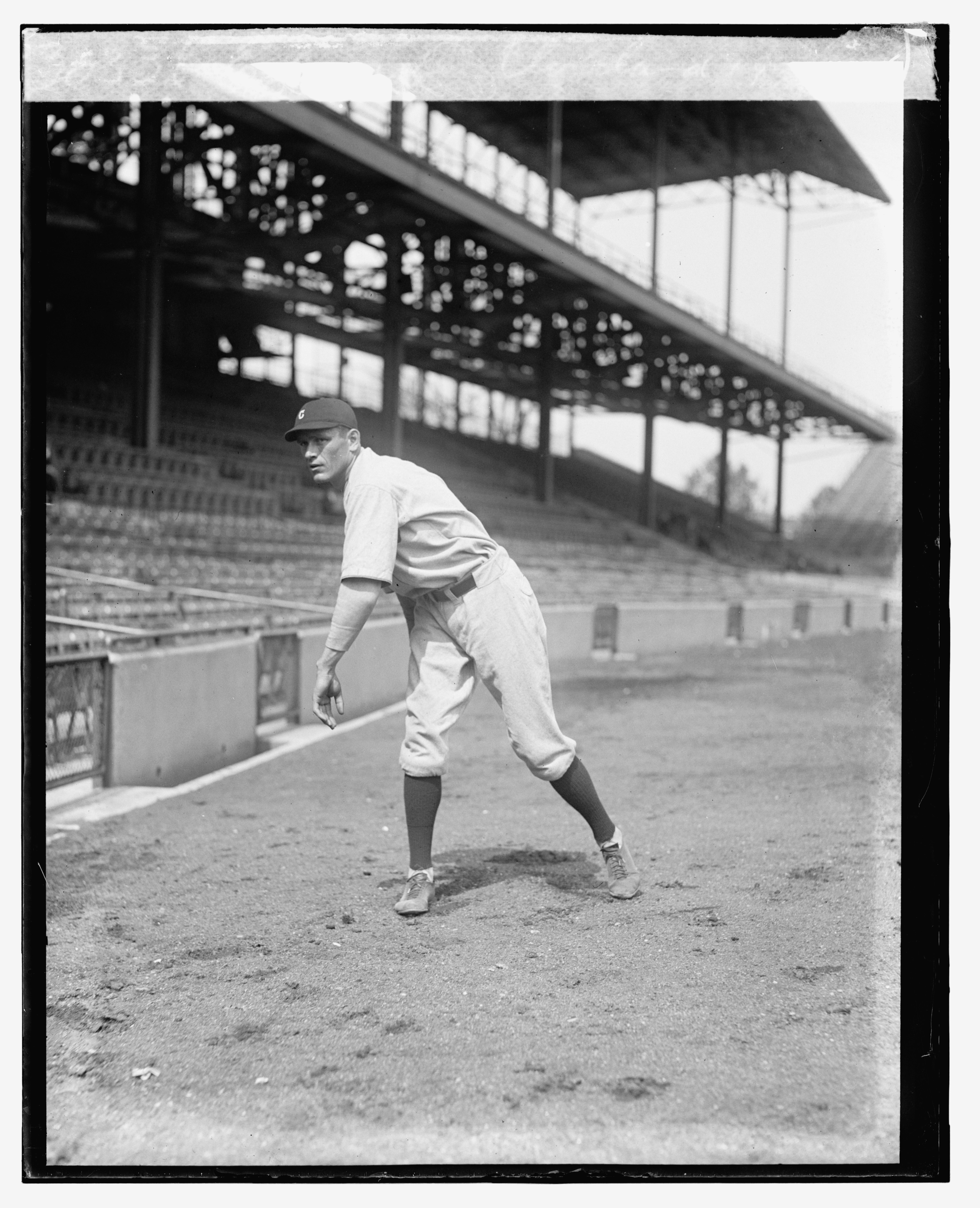
- Edwards in 1924
- Pitcher
- Born: December 14, 1894; Banner, Mississippi, U.S.
- Died: January 19, 1965 (aged 70); Sarepta, Mississippi, U.S.
- Batted: Right Threw: Left

MLB debut
- May 14, 1922, for the Cleveland Indians

Last MLB appearance
- July 19, 1928, for the Cincinnati Reds

MLB statistics
- Win–loss record: 26–37
- Earned run average: 4.37
- Strikeouts: 211
- Stats at Baseball Reference

Teams
- Cleveland Indians (1922–1925); Chicago White Sox (1925–1926); Cincinnati Reds (1928)

James Corbette "Jim Joe" Edwards (December 14, 1894 – January 19, 1965) was an American pitcher in Major League Baseball who played for different teams between the 1922 and 1928 seasons. Listed at 6 ft 2 in (1.88 m), 185 lb., Edwards batted right-handed and threw left-handed. He was inducted into the Mississippi Sports Hall of Fame in 1966.

A native of Banner, Mississippi, Edwards attended Mississippi College and played college baseball there. After graduating in April 1922, the Cleveland Indians signed him to a contract and immediately placed him on the major league roster. He made his debut on May 14, and in 25 games he had a 3–8 win–loss record and a 4.47 earned run average (ERA). In 1923, he spent some time as a starting pitcher and some as a relief pitcher. In 38 games, 21 of them starts, he had a 10–10 record and a 3.71 ERA in 179.1 innings pitched.

In 1924, Edwards pitched in 10 games for the Indians, and had a 4–3 record and a 2.84 ERA. After 13 games and an ERA of 8.25 the following season, he was released and picked up by the Chicago White Sox, pitching in nine games towards the end of the season. Edwards spent the 1926 season with the White Sox, and had a 6–9 record and a 4.18 ERA in 32 games, 16 of them starts. In 1927, he had his first taste of minor league baseball, and spent the year with the Seattle Indians. In 41 games for them, he had a 20–17 record and a 3.36 ERA. The following season he had a 1–8 record and a 3.14 ERA in ten games. The Cincinnati Reds signed him to a contract during part of the 1928 season, and in his last season in the majors, he had a 2–2 record and a 7.59 ERA in 18 appearances. He then spent four more seasons in the minor leagues to end his professional career. In a six-season career, Edwards posted a 26–37 record with 211 strikeouts and a 4.37 ERA in 145 appearances, including 59 starts, 23 complete games, six shutouts, four saves, and 584 1/3 innings of work.

After retiring, Edwards moved to Pontotoc, Mississippi and became a teacher and football coach.

He died in Sarepta, Mississippi, at the age of 70, as the result of an automobile accident.
