= Mike Cvengros =

American baseball player (1900–1970)

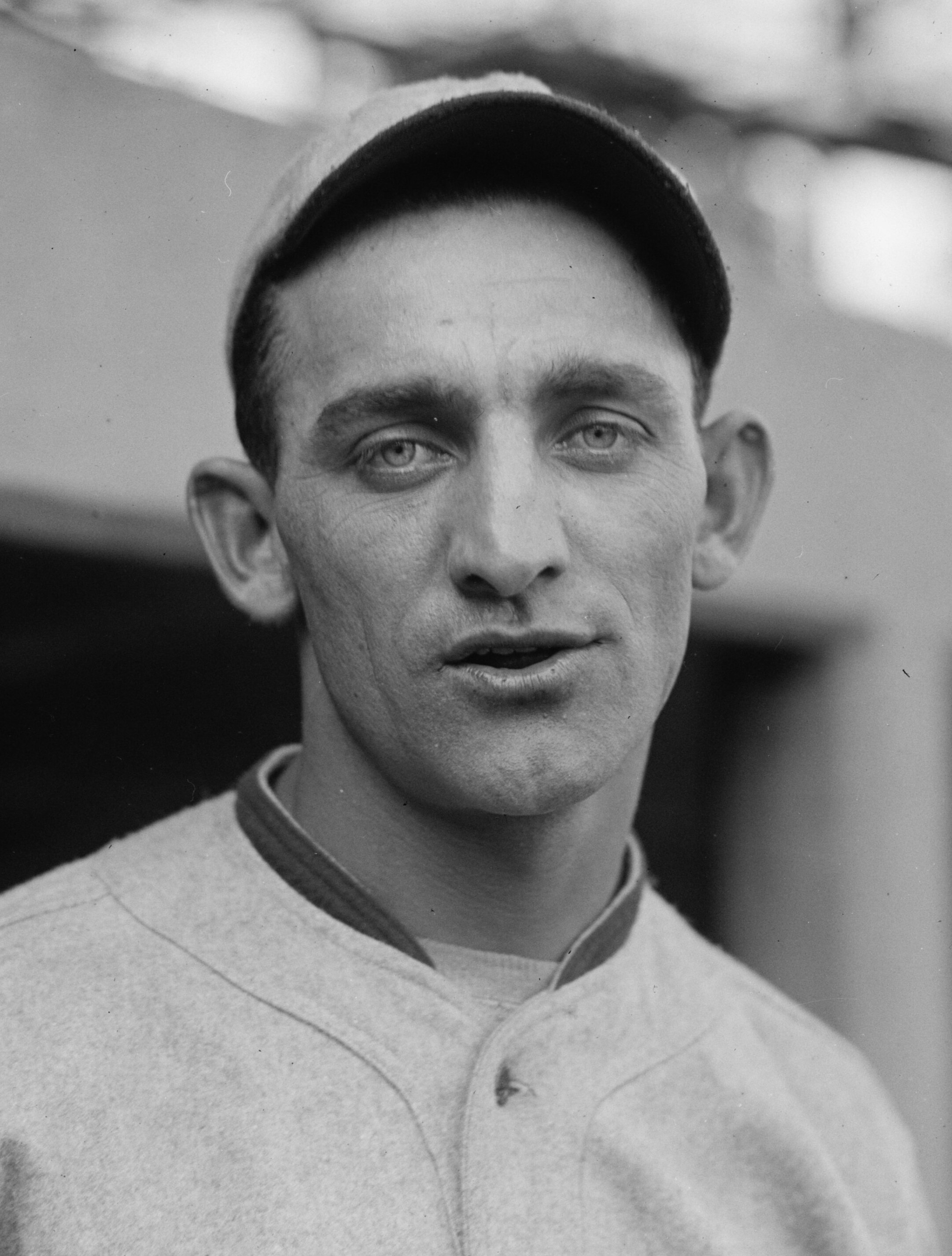
- Cvengros in 1924
- Pitcher
- Born: December 1, 1900; Pana, Illinois, U.S.
- Died: August 2, 1970 (aged 69); Hot Springs, Arkansas, U.S.
- Batted: Left Threw: Left

MLB debut
- September 30, 1922, for the New York Giants

Last MLB appearance
- October 5, 1929, for the Chicago Cubs

MLB statistics
- Win–loss record: 25–40
- Earned run average: 4.59
- Strikeouts: 201
- Stats at Baseball Reference

Teams
- New York Giants (1922); Chicago White Sox (1923–1925); Pittsburgh Pirates (1927); Chicago Cubs (1929)

Michael John Cvengros (December 1, 1900 – August 2, 1970) was an American Major League Baseball pitcher. He played all or part of six seasons in the majors, between 1922 and 1929, for the New York Giants, Chicago White Sox, Pittsburgh Pirates, and Chicago Cubs. After his major league career, he played in the minor leagues until 1937, mostly for the Houston Buffaloes. In that final season, he served part of the year as the Buffaloes' manager.
