= 1920 Boston Red Sox season =

Major League Baseball season

1920 Boston Red Sox
- League: American League
- Ballpark: Fenway Park
- City: Boston, Massachusetts
- Record: 72–81 (.471)
- League place: 5th
- Owners: Harry Frazee
- Managers: Ed Barrow
- Stats: ESPN.com; Baseball Reference

The 1920 Boston Red Sox season was the 20th season in the franchise's Major League Baseball history. The Red Sox finished fifth in the American League (AL) with a record of 72 wins and 81 losses, 25 1/2 games behind the Cleveland Indians, who went on to win the 1920 World Series.

== Offseason ==
On January 5, 1920, news that the Red Sox sold their star pitcher-turned-outfielder Babe Ruth to the Yankees for $125,000 (equivalent to $2,300,000 in 2025) became public, the sub-headline in The New York Times the next day read, "Highest Purchase Price in Baseball History Paid for Game's Greatest Slugger." The trade to the Yankees would live in infamy for generations of Boston red sox fans for nearly 85 years and was one of the worse highlights of that offseason.

== Regular season ==
=== Season standings ===
American League
| Team | W | L | Pct. | GB | Home | Road |
|---|---|---|---|---|---|---|
| Cleveland Indians | 98 | 56 | .636 | — | 51‍–‍27 | 47‍–‍29 |
| Chicago White Sox | 96 | 58 | .623 | 2 | 52‍–‍25 | 44‍–‍33 |
| New York Yankees | 95 | 59 | .617 | 3 | 49‍–‍28 | 46‍–‍31 |
| St. Louis Browns | 76 | 77 | .497 | 21½ | 40‍–‍38 | 36‍–‍39 |
| Boston Red Sox | 72 | 81 | .471 | 25½ | 41‍–‍35 | 31‍–‍46 |
| Washington Senators | 68 | 84 | .447 | 29 | 37‍–‍38 | 31‍–‍46 |
| Detroit Tigers | 61 | 93 | .396 | 37 | 32‍–‍46 | 29‍–‍47 |
| Philadelphia Athletics | 48 | 106 | .312 | 50 | 25‍–‍50 | 23‍–‍56 |

=== Record vs. opponents ===
1920 American League record Sources:
| Team | BOS | CWS | CLE | DET | NYY | PHA | SLB | WSH |
|---|---|---|---|---|---|---|---|---|
| Boston | — | 12–10 | 6–16 | 13–9 | 9–13 | 13–9–1 | 9–13 | 10–11 |
| Chicago | 10–12 | — | 10–12 | 19–3 | 10–12 | 16–6 | 14–8 | 17–5 |
| Cleveland | 16–6 | 12–10 | — | 15–7 | 9–13 | 16–6 | 15–7 | 15–7 |
| Detroit | 9–13 | 3–19 | 7–15 | — | 7–15 | 12–10–1 | 10–12 | 13–9 |
| New York | 13–9 | 12–10 | 13–9 | 15–7 | — | 19–3 | 12–10 | 11–11 |
| Philadelphia | 9–13–1 | 6–16 | 6–16 | 10–12–1 | 3–19 | — | 8–14 | 6–16 |
| St. Louis | 13–9 | 8–14 | 7–15 | 12–10 | 10–12 | 14–8 | — | 12–9–1 |
| Washington | 11–10 | 5–17 | 7–15 | 9–13 | 11–11 | 16–6 | 9–12–1 | — |

=== Opening Day lineup ===
| Harry Hooper | RF |
| Mike McNally | 2B |
| Mike Menosky | LF |
| Tim Hendryx | RF |
| Stuffy McInnis | 1B |
| Eddie Foster | 3B |
| Everett Scott | SS |
| Roxy Walters | C |
| Allen Russell | P |

=== Roster ===
1920 Boston Red Sox
Roster
| Pitchers: Joe Bush; Hal Deviney; Gary Fortune; Harry Harper; Waite Hoyt; Sad Sam Jones; Hack Eibel; Benn Karr; Elmer Myers; Herb Pennock; Allen Russell | Catchers: Ed Chaplin; Mickey Devine; Wally Schang; Paddy Smith; Roxy Walters; Infielders: Cliff Brady; Eddie Foster; Ray Grimes; Hob Hiller; Stuffy McInnis; Mike McNally; Everett Scott; Ossie Vitt | Outfielders: Gene Bailey; Hack Eibel; Tim Hendryx; Harry Hooper; Herb Hunter; Mike Menosky; George Orme; Ben Paschal; Jigger Statz | Manager: Ed Barrow |

== Player stats ==
=== Batting ===
==== Starters by position ====
Note: Pos = Position; G = Games played; AB = At bats; H = Hits; Avg. = Batting average; HR = Home runs; RBI = Runs batted in

| Pos | Player | G | AB | H | Avg. | HR | RBI |
|---|---|---|---|---|---|---|---|
| C | Roxy Walters | 88 | 258 | 51 | .198 | 0 | 28 |
| 1B | Stuffy McInnis | 148 | 559 | 166 | .297 | 2 | 71 |
| 2B | Mike McNally | 93 | 312 | 80 | .256 | 0 | 23 |
| 3B | Eddie Foster | 117 | 386 | 100 | .259 | 0 | 41 |
| SS | Everett Scott | 154 | 569 | 153 | .269 | 4 | 61 |
| OF | Tim Hendryx | 99 | 363 | 119 | .328 | 0 | 73 |
| OF | Mike Menosky | 141 | 532 | 158 | .297 | 3 | 64 |
| OF | Harry Hooper | 139 | 536 | 167 | .312 | 7 | 53 |

==== Other batters ====
Note: G = Games played; AB = At bats; H = Hits; Avg. = Batting average; HR = Home runs; RBI = Runs batted in

| Player | G | AB | H | Avg. | HR | RBI |
|---|---|---|---|---|---|---|
| Wally Schang | 122 | 387 | 118 | .305 | 4 | 51 |
| Ossie Vitt | 87 | 296 | 65 | .220 | 1 | 28 |
| Cliff Brady | 53 | 180 | 41 | .228 | 0 | 12 |
| Gene Bailey | 46 | 135 | 31 | .230 | 0 | 5 |
| Hack Eibel | 29 | 47 | 8 | .186 | 0 | 6 |
| Hob Hiller | 17 | 29 | 5 | .172 | 0 | 2 |
| Ben Paschal | 9 | 28 | 19 | .357 | 0 | 5 |
| Mickey Devine | 8 | 12 | 2 | .167 | 0 | 0 |
| Herb Hunter | 4 | 12 | 1 | .083 | 0 | 0 |
| George Orme | 4 | 6 | 2 | .333 | 0 | 1 |
| Ed Chaplin | 4 | 5 | 1 | .200 | 0 | 0 |
| Ray Grimes | 1 | 4 | 1 | .250 | 0 | 0 |
| Paddy Smith | 2 | 2 | 0 | .000 | 0 | 0 |
| Jigger Statz | 2 | 3 | 0 | .000 | 0 | 0 |

=== Pitching ===
==== Starting pitchers ====
Note: G = Games pitched; IP = Innings pitched; W = Wins; L = Losses; ERA = Earned run average; SO = Strikeouts

| Player | G | IP | W | L | ERA | SO |
|---|---|---|---|---|---|---|
| Sam Jones | 37 | 274.0 | 13 | 16 | 3.94 | 86 |
| Joe Bush | 35 | 243.2 | 15 | 15 | 4.25 | 88 |
| Herb Pennock | 37 | 242.1 | 16 | 13 | 3.68 | 68 |
| Harry Harper | 27 | 162.2 | 5 | 14 | 3.04 | 71 |
| Allen Russell | 16 | 107.2 | 5 | 6 | 3.01 | 53 |
| Elmer Myers | 12 | 97.0 | 9 | 1 | 2.13 | 34 |

==== Other pitchers ====
Note: G = Games pitched; IP = Innings pitched; W = Wins; L = Losses; ERA = Earned run average; SO = Strikeouts

| Player | G | IP | W | L | ERA | SO |
|---|---|---|---|---|---|---|
| Waite Hoyt | 22 | 121.1 | 6 | 6 | 4.38 | 45 |
| Gary Fortune | 14 | 41.2 | 0 | 2 | 5.83 | 10 |

==== Relief pitchers ====
Note: G = Games pitched; W = Wins; L = Losses; SV = Saves; ERA = Earned run average; SO = Strikeouts

| Player | G | W | L | SV | ERA | SO |
|---|---|---|---|---|---|---|
| Benn Karr | 26 | 3 | 8 | 1 | 4.81 | 21 |
| Hack Eibel | 3 | 0 | 0 | 0 | 3.48 | 5 |
| Hal Deviney | 1 | 0 | 0 | 0 | 15.00 | 0 |
