= 1920 Cleveland Indians season =

1920 Cleveland Indians
- World Series champions American League champions
- League: American League
- Ballpark: Dunn Field
- City: Cleveland, Ohio
- Owners: Jim Dunn
- Managers: Tris Speaker

The 1920 Cleveland Indians season was the 20th season in franchise history. The Indians won the American League pennant and proceeded to win their first World Series title in the history of the franchise. Pitchers Jim Bagby, Stan Coveleski and Ray Caldwell combined to win 75 games. Despite the team's success, the season was perhaps more indelibly marked by the death of starting shortstop Ray Chapman, who died after being hit by a pitch on August 16.

== Regular season ==
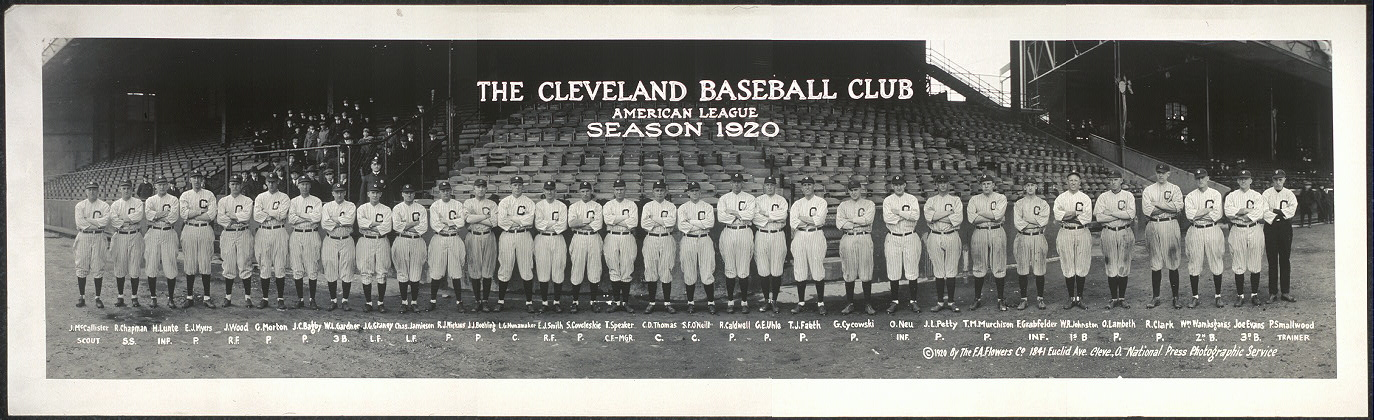
The 1920 Cleveland Indians

During the season, Jim Bagby became the last pitcher to win 30 games in one season for the Indians in the 20th century.

On August 17, shortstop Ray Chapman died after being hit by a pitch in a game against the Yankees, becoming the second of only two Major League Baseball players to have died as a result of an injury received in a game (the first was Mike "Doc" Powers in 1909).

=== Season standings ===
American League
Team	W	L	Pct.	GB	Home	Road
Cleveland Indians	98	56	.636	—	51‍–‍27	47‍–‍29
Chicago White Sox	96	58	.623	2	52‍–‍25	44‍–‍33
New York Yankees	95	59	.617	3	49‍–‍28	46‍–‍31
St. Louis Browns	76	77	.497	21½	40‍–‍38	36‍–‍39
Boston Red Sox	72	81	.471	25½	41‍–‍35	31‍–‍46
Washington Senators	68	84	.447	29	37‍–‍38	31‍–‍46
Detroit Tigers	61	93	.396	37	32‍–‍46	29‍–‍47
Philadelphia Athletics	48	106	.312	50	25‍–‍50	23‍–‍56

=== Record vs. opponents ===
1920 American League record Sources:
Team	BOS	CWS	CLE	DET	NYY	PHA	SLB	WSH
Boston	—	12–10	6–16	13–9	9–13	13–9–1	9–13	10–11
Chicago	10–12	—	10–12	19–3	10–12	16–6	14–8	17–5
Cleveland	16–6	12–10	—	15–7	9–13	16–6	15–7	15–7
Detroit	9–13	3–19	7–15	—	7–15	12–10–1	10–12	13–9
New York	13–9	12–10	13–9	15–7	—	19–3	12–10	11–11
Philadelphia	9–13–1	6–16	6–16	10–12–1	3–19	—	8–14	6–16
St. Louis	13–9	8–14	7–15	12–10	10–12	14–8	—	12–9–1
Washington	11–10	5–17	7–15	9–13	11–11	16–6	9–12–1	—

=== Roster ===
1920 Cleveland Indians
Roster
Pitchers: Jim Bagby; Joe Boehling; Ray Caldwell; Bob Clark; Stan Coveleski; George Ellison; Tony Faeth; Duster Mails; Guy Morton; Tim Murchison; Elmer Myers; Dick Niehaus; George Uhle	Catchers: Les Nunamaker; Steve O'Neill; Pinch Thomas; Infielders: George Burns; Ray Chapman; Larry Gardner; Doc Johnston; Harry Lunte; Joe Sewell; Bill Wambsganss	Outfielders: Joe Evans; Jack Graney; Charlie Jamieson; Elmer Smith; Tris Speaker; Joe Wood	Manager: Tris Speaker; Coaches: Jack McCallister

== Player stats ==
= Indicates team leader

=== Batting ===
==== Starters by position ====
Note: Pos = Position; G = Games played; AB = At bats; H = Hits; Avg. = Batting average; HR = Home runs; RBI = Runs batted in

Pos	Player	G	AB	H	Avg.	HR	RBI
C	Steve O'Neill	149	489	157	.321	3	55
1B	Doc Johnston	147	535	156	.292	2	71
2B	Bill Wambsganss	153	565	138	.244	1	55
3B	Larry Gardner	154	597	185	.310	3	118
SS	Ray Chapman	111	435	132	.303	3	49
LF	Charlie Jamieson	108	370	118	.319	1	40
CF	Tris Speaker	150	552	214	.388	8	107
RF	Elmer Smith	129	456	144	.316	12	103

==== Other batters ====
Note: G = Games played; AB = At bats; H = Hits; Avg. = Batting average; HR = Home runs; RBI = Runs batted in

Player	G	AB	H	Avg.	HR	RBI
Joe Evans	56	172	60	.349	0	23
Jack Graney	62	152	45	.296	0	13
Joe Wood	61	137	37	.270	1	30
Harry Lunte	23	71	14	.197	0	7
Joe Sewell	22	70	23	.329	0	12
George Burns	44	56	15	.268	0	13
Les Nunamaker	34	54	18	.333	0	14
Pinch Thomas	9	9	3	.333	0	0

=== Pitching ===
==== Starting pitchers ====
Note: G = Games pitched; IP = Innings pitched; W = Wins; L = Losses; ERA = Earned run average; SO = Strikeouts

Player	G	IP	W	L	ERA	SO
Jim Bagby	48	339.2	31	12	2.89	73
Stan Coveleski	41	315.0	24	14	2.49	133
Ray Caldwell	34	237.2	20	10	3.86	80
Guy Morton	29	137.0	8	6	4.47	72
Duster Mails	9	63.1	7	0	1.85	25

Note: Guy Morton was team leader in saves with 3.

==== Relief pitchers ====
Note: G = Games pitched; IP = Innings pitched; W = Wins; L = Losses; SV = Saves; ERA = Earned run average; SO = Strikeouts

Player	G	IP	W	L	SV	ERA	SO
George Uhle	27	84.2	4	5	0	5.21	27
Elmer Myers	16	71.2	2	4	0	4.77	16
Bob Clark	11	42.0	1	2	0	3.43	8
Dick Niehaus	19	40.0	1	2	0	3.60	12
Tony Faeth	13	25.0	0	0	0	4.32	14
Joe Boehling	3	13.0	0	1	0	4.85	4
Tim Murchison	2	5.0	0	0	0	0.00	0
Joe Wood	1	2.0	0	0	0	22.50	1
George Ellison	1	1.0	0	0	0	0.00	1

== 1920 World Series ==
On October 10, 1920, which was the fifth game of the World Series, Bill Wambsganss of the Indians executed an unassisted triple play. He caught a line drive, touched second base, and tagged the runner coming from first base. On the same day, Elmer Smith hit the first grand slam in World Series history. During that same game, Indians pitcher Jim Bagby became the first pitcher to hit a home run in World Series history.

AL Cleveland Indians (5) vs. NL Brooklyn Robins (2)

Game	Score	Date	Location	Attendance
1	Indians – 3, Robins – 1	October 5	Ebbets Field	23,759
2	Indians – 0, Robins – 3	October 6	Ebbets Field	22,559
3	Indians – 1, Robins – 2	October 7	Ebbets Field	25,088
4	Robins – 1, Indians – 5	October 9	Dunn Field	25,734
5	Robins – 1, Indians – 8	October 10	Dunn Field	26,884
6	Robins – 0, Indians – 1	October 11	Dunn Field	27,194
7	Robins – 0, Indians – 3	October 12	Dunn Field	27,525

=== Game 1 ===
October 5, 1920, at Ebbets Field in Brooklyn, New York

Team	1	2	3	4	5	6	7	8	9	R	H	E
Cleveland	0	2	0	1	0	0	0	0	0	3	5	0
Brooklyn	0	0	0	0	0	0	1	0	0	1	5	1
W: Stan Coveleski (1–0) L: Rube Marquard (0–1)

=== Game 2 ===
October 6, 1920, at Ebbets Field in Brooklyn, New York

Team	1	2	3	4	5	6	7	8	9	R	H	E
Cleveland	0	0	0	0	0	0	0	0	0	0	7	1
Brooklyn	1	0	1	0	1	0	0	0	x	3	7	0
W: Burleigh Grimes (1–0) L: Jim Bagby (0–1)

=== Game 3 ===
October 7, 1920, at Ebbets Field in Brooklyn, New York

Team	1	2	3	4	5	6	7	8	9	R	H	E
Cleveland	0	0	0	1	0	0	0	0	0	1	3	1
Brooklyn	2	0	0	0	0	0	0	0	x	2	6	1
W: Sherry Smith (1–0) L: Ray Caldwell (0–1)

=== Game 4 ===
October 9, 1920, at Dunn Field in Cleveland, Ohio

Team	1	2	3	4	5	6	7	8	9	R	H	E
Brooklyn	0	0	0	1	0	0	0	0	0	1	5	1
Cleveland	2	0	2	0	0	1	0	0	x	5	12	1
W: Stan Coveleski (2–0) L: Leon Cadore (0–1)

=== Game 5 ===
October 10, 1920, at Dunn Field in Cleveland, Ohio

Team	1	2	3	4	5	6	7	8	9	R	H	E
Brooklyn	0	0	0	0	0	0	0	0	1	1	13	1
Cleveland	4	0	0	3	1	0	0	0	x	8	12	2
W: Jim Bagby (1–1) L: Burleigh Grimes (1–1)
HR: CLE – Elmer Smith (1), Jim Bagby (1)

=== Game 6 ===
October 11, 1920, at Dunn Field in Cleveland, Ohio

Team	1	2	3	4	5	6	7	8	9	R	H	E
Brooklyn	0	0	0	0	0	0	0	0	0	0	3	0
Cleveland	0	0	0	0	1	0	0	0	x	1	7	3
W: Duster Mails (1–0) L: Sherry Smith (1–1)

=== Game 7 ===
October 12, 1920, at Dunn Field in Cleveland, Ohio

Team	1	2	3	4	5	6	7	8	9	R	H	E
Brooklyn	0	0	0	0	0	0	0	0	0	0	5	2
Cleveland	0	0	0	1	1	0	1	0	x	3	7	3
W: Stan Coveleski (3–0) L: Burleigh Grimes (1–2)

== Composite box ==
1920 World Series (5–2): Cleveland Indians (A.L.) over Brooklyn Robins (N.L.)

Team	1	2	3	4	5	6	7	8	9	R	H	E
Cleveland Indians	6	2	2	6	2	2	1	0	0	21	53	12
Brooklyn Robins	3	0	1	1	1	0	1	0	1	8	44	6
Total Attendance: 236,928 Average Attendance: 29,616
Winning Player's Share: – $5,207 Losing Player's Share – $3,254
