= Hob Hiller =

American baseball player (1893–1956)

Harvey Max Hiller
- Third baseman
- Born: May 12, 1893; East Mauch Chunk, Pennsylvania, U.S.
- Died: December 27, 1956 (aged 63); Lehighton, Pennsylvania, U.S.
- Batted: Right Threw: Right

MLB debut
- April 22, 1920, for the Boston Red Sox

Last appearance
- April 14, 1921, for the Boston Red Sox

MLB statistics
- Batting average: .167
- Home runs: 0
- RBI: 2
- Stats at Baseball Reference

Former teams
- Boston Red Sox (1920–1921)

Harvey Max "Hob" Hiller (May 12, 1893 – December 27, 1956) was an American Major League Baseball utility player for the Boston Red Sox in 1920 and 1921. Listed at 5 ft 8 in (1.73 m), 162 lb., Hiller batted and threw right-handed. Although he hit only .167 in the major leagues, Hiller batted .300 or above in several minor league seasons. The Boston Herald described him as a talented but raw fielder.

== Early life and education ==
Hiller was born in East Mauch Chunk, Pennsylvania, on May 12, 1893, to George Hiller, a railroad engineer, and his wife Elizabeth Hiller. The younger Hiller had seven years of education and did not attend high school.

== Professional career ==
=== Minor league career ===
Hiller first played professional baseball in the North Carolina State League with the 1915 Durham Bulls as a third baseman. He had 113 hits (including four home runs) in 468 at bats, producing a .241 batting average. In September, Hiller's contract was sold to the St. Louis Cardinals for $500.

In March 1916, Hiller's contract was sold again, this time to the minor league Winston-Salem Twins. In his second season in the North Carolina State League, he recorded 145 hits in 446 at bats for a .325 batting average. He also stole 28 bases.

Hiller began the 1917 season with the Columbia Comers of the South Atlantic League. In 40 games there, he batted .293, stole 13 bases, and scored 21 runs. In a June 1st game against the Jacksonville Roses, Hiller was struck in the head by a pitch, which put him into a semiconscious state but did not fracture his skull. Later that year, Hiller hit .262 over 17 games with the Scranton Miners of the New York State League. In Scranton, for the first time in his career, Hiller mainly played shortstop.

Hiller did not play professional baseball in 1918 due to World War I, but returned to the game in 1919 with the Petersburg Goobers of the Virginia League, with whom he batted .270 in 110 games.

=== Boston Red Sox: 1920–21 ===
Hiller signed a contract with the Red Sox on January 4, 1920, and joined the team for spring training. He made his major league debut on April 22, 1920, in a game against the Washington Senators as a midgame substitution. He played right field and went 0-for-2 at the plate. Hiller recorded his first major league hit in a May 12, 1920 game against the Cleveland Indians, singling to center in the bottom of the 9th inning against Indians pitcher Guy Morton. However, he went hitless throughout the rest of May and all of June. On July 15, 1920, the Red Sox traded Hiller and catcher Paddy Smith to the Pittsfield Hillies of the Eastern League for Cliff Brady. Hiller played in 69 games for Pittsfield and hit .350. He returned to the Red Sox after the Eastern League season ended. Whereas in the spring Hiller had primarily been used as a substitute shortstop, second baseman, and pinch runner, in September he started several games at third base. During the month of September, Hiller recorded four hits, including a double and a triple, but was also caught stealing three times. Hiller appeared in the last game of the season on September 28, 1920, as a pinch runner, and finished the game in center field. He finished 1920 with a slash line of .172/.226/.276, four runs scored, and two runs batted in.

In 1921, Hiller again participated in spring training with the Red Sox in Hot Springs, Arkansas, and made the team's initial roster. He appeared in the second game of the season, on April 14, 1921, against the Washington Senators, as a pinch hitter, and made an out in his only at bat. It was his only appearance in the major leagues that season, and the last of his career. Boston dealt him to the Rochester Colts of the International League shortly afterward.

=== Later career ===
Hiller hit exactly .300 in 114 games with Rochester in 1921 while playing mainly second base. In 1922, he moved to the San Antonio Bears of the Texas League. As their third baseman, Hiller played in 122 games and got 104 hits, including 18 doubles, three triples, and two home runs, for a batting average of .259 and a slugging percentage of .336. After the 1922 season, Hiller did not participate in professional baseball until 1928, when, at age 35, he was signed by the Beaumont Exporters. In 16 games there, he batted .218 with a .273 slugging percentage.

In 1939, Hiller managed the Hazleton Mountaineers of the Interstate League for part of the season until he was released on June 10.

== Post-playing career ==
While still playing, Hiller worked as a brakeman during the off-season. After his baseball career ended, he continued to work on the railroad until November 6, 1940, when, while working for the Central Railroad of New Jersey, Hiller fell off the top of a caboose and had his right leg amputated. The next year, Hiller was awarded $65,000 as the result of a lawsuit over the incident. Subsequently, he served as the register of deeds and the registrar of wills in Carbon County, Pennsylvania.

== Personal life and death ==
Hiller married Jessie Rebecca Wildoner on March 20, 1913, and had four children with her. He died of a heart attack on December 27, 1956, at a hospital in Lehighton, Pennsylvania.
