= 1920 New York Yankees season =

Season for the Major League Baseball team the New York Yankees

1920 New York Yankees
- League: American League
- Ballpark: Polo Grounds
- City: New York City, New York
- Record: 95–59 (.617)
- League place: 3rd
- Owners: Jacob Ruppert and Tillinghast L'Hommedieu Huston
- Managers: Miller Huggins

The 1920 New York Yankees season was the 18th season for the Yankees. The team finished with a record of 95–59, just 3 games behind the American League champion Cleveland Indians. New York was managed by Miller Huggins. Home games were played at the Polo Grounds. The Yankees of 1920 were the first team in the history of Major League Baseball to have an attendance of more than one million fans.

== Offseason ==
The year started with a bang on January 5, when the Boston Red Sox sold their star pitcher-turned-outfielder Babe Ruth to the Yankees for $125,000 (equivalent to $2,300,000 in 2025). The sub-headline in The New York Times the next day read, "Highest Purchase Price in Baseball History Paid for Game's Greatest Slugger." This deal would live in infamy for generations of Boston fans, and would vault the Yankees from respectability (80 wins in 1919) to pennant contention.

== Regular season ==
Babe Ruth, his wife, and three teammates were in a car accident on July 7, 1920, from which they were lucky to walk away. Ruth was driving the group back to New York from Washington where the Yankees had beaten the Senators the previous day. Nearing Wawa, Pennsylvania at 2:00 AM, Ruth missed a sharp curve, drove into a ditch, and totaled the car where it flipped on top of them. Ruth was able to move the vehicle, and all five made it to a local farmhouse where they were attended to. They were driven that same day to Philadelphia where they boarded a train for New York. Ruth was in the lineup for the next game on July 8, 1920, where he went one for four with a triple against the Detroit Tigers.

The Indians won the pennant despite a horrific incident at the Polo Grounds on August 16. Yankees pitcher Carl Mays, another of several ex-Red Sox players who had come the Yankees' way, used a "submarine" (underhand) pitching style. He threw one up and in on Cleveland shortstop Ray Chapman, who tended to crowd the plate and apparently never saw the ball coming. Chapman suffered a severe skull fracture, and died the following morning. Mays was absolved of any wrongdoing, but the incident would haunt him for the rest of his life. Meanwhile, the Indians rallied around the memory of their shortstop, and won the season.

However, with Ruth leading the Yankees, and with his stunning total of 54 home runs (George Sisler the second place homerun holder that year, only hit 19) nearly doubling his own major league record from just the previous year, New York finished just a game behind the second-place Chicago White Sox and three behind the Indians. Ruth's 54 home runs marked an end to the dead-ball era, and ushered in a new style of play with an emphasis on power hitting. The Yankees had once been the "poor relations of the Polo Grounds", as Lamont Buchanan characterized them in The World Series and Highlights of Baseball. But the Giants had faded a bit in the late 1910s while the Yankees had grown stronger. The Yankees were now poised to take the next step to beginning the greatest dynasty in professional sports.

=== Season standings ===
American League
Team	W	L	Pct.	GB	Home	Road
Cleveland Indians	98	56	.636	—	51‍–‍27	47‍–‍29
Chicago White Sox	96	58	.623	2	52‍–‍25	44‍–‍33
New York Yankees	95	59	.617	3	49‍–‍28	46‍–‍31
St. Louis Browns	76	77	.497	21½	40‍–‍38	36‍–‍39
Boston Red Sox	72	81	.471	25½	41‍–‍35	31‍–‍46
Washington Senators	68	84	.447	29	37‍–‍38	31‍–‍46
Detroit Tigers	61	93	.396	37	32‍–‍46	29‍–‍47
Philadelphia Athletics	48	106	.312	50	25‍–‍50	23‍–‍56

=== Record vs. opponents ===
1920 American League record Sources:
Team	BOS	CWS	CLE	DET	NYY	PHA	SLB	WSH
Boston	—	12–10	6–16	13–9	9–13	13–9–1	9–13	10–11
Chicago	10–12	—	10–12	19–3	10–12	16–6	14–8	17–5
Cleveland	16–6	12–10	—	15–7	9–13	16–6	15–7	15–7
Detroit	9–13	3–19	7–15	—	7–15	12–10–1	10–12	13–9
New York	13–9	12–10	13–9	15–7	—	19–3	12–10	11–11
Philadelphia	9–13–1	6–16	6–16	10–12–1	3–19	—	8–14	6–16
St. Louis	13–9	8–14	7–15	12–10	10–12	14–8	—	12–9–1
Washington	11–10	5–17	7–15	9–13	11–11	16–6	9–12–1	—

=== Roster ===
1920 New York Yankees
Roster
Pitchers: Rip Collins; Carl Mays; Bob McGraw; George Mogridge; Lefty O'Doul; Jack Quinn; Bob Shawkey; Ernie Shore; Hank Thormahlen	Catchers: Truck Hannah; Fred Hofmann; Muddy Ruel; Infielders: Chick Fewster; Ray French; Joe Lucey; Roger Peckinpaugh; Wally Pipp; Del Pratt; Aaron Ward	Outfielders: Ping Bodie; Frank Gleich; Duffy Lewis; Bob Meusel; Babe Ruth; Sammy Vick; Other batters: Tom Connelly	Manager: Miller Huggins

== Player stats ==
= Indicates team leader

= Indicates league leader

=== Batting ===
==== Starters by position ====
Note: Pos = Position; G = Games played; AB = At bats; H = Hits; Avg. = Batting average; HR = Home runs; RBI = Runs batted in

Pos	Player	G	AB	H	Avg.	HR	RBI
C	Truck Hannah	79	259	64	.247	2	25
1B	Wally Pipp	153	610	171	.280	11	76
2B	Del Pratt	154	574	180	.314	4	108
SS	Roger Peckinpaugh	139	534	144	.270	8	54
3B	Aaron Ward	127	496	127	.256	11	56
OF	Ping Bodie	129	471	139	.295	7	77
OF	Duffy Lewis	107	365	99	.271	4	59
OF	Babe Ruth	142	457	172	.376	54	137

==== Other batters ====
Note: G = Games played; AB = At bats; H = Hits; Avg. = Batting average; HR = Home runs; RBI = Runs batted in

Player	G	AB	H	Avg.	HR	RBI
Bob Meusel	119	460	151	.328	11	83
Muddy Ruel	82	261	70	.268	1	14
Sammy Vick	51	118	26	.220	0	11
Frank Gleich	24	41	5	.122	0	4
Fred Hofmann	15	24	7	.292	0	1
Chick Fewster	21	21	6	.286	0	1
Joe Lucey	3	3	0	.000	0	0
Ray French	2	2	0	.000	0	1
Tom Connelly	1	1	0	.000	0	0

=== Pitching ===
==== Starting pitchers ====
Note: G = Games pitched; IP = Innings pitched; W = Wins; L = Losses; ERA = Earned run average; SO = Strikeouts

Player	G	IP	W	L	ERA	SO
Carl Mays	45	312.0	26	11	3.06	92
Bob Shawkey	38	267.2	20	13	2.45	126
Jack Quinn	41	253.1	18	10	3.20	101
Hank Thormahlen	29	143.1	9	6	4.14	35
George Mogridge	26	125.1	5	9	4.31	35
Babe Ruth	1	4.0	1	0	4.50	0

==== Other pitchers ====
Note: G = Games pitched; IP = Innings pitched; W = Wins; L = Losses; ERA = Earned run average; SO = Strikeouts

Player	G	IP	W	L	ERA	SO
Rip Collins	36	187.1	14	8	3.22	66

==== Relief pitchers ====
Note: G = Games pitched; W = Wins; L = Losses; SV = Saves; ERA = Earned run average; SO = Strikeouts

Player	G	W	L	SV	ERA	SO
Ernie Shore	14	2	2	1	4.87	12
Bob McGraw	15	0	0	0	4.67	11
Lefty O'Doul	2	0	0	0	4.91	2

== Awards ==
=== Records ===
- Babe Ruth, 20th century record, Highest slugging average in one season (.847)
