= Spencer Heath (baseball) =

American baseball player (1893–1930)

- Pitcher
- Born: November 5, 1893; Chicago, Illinois, US
- Died: January 25, 1930 (aged 36); Chicago, Illinois, US
- Batted: Both Threw: Right

MLB debut
- May 4, 1920, for the Chicago White Sox

Last MLB appearance
- July 17, 1920, for the Chicago White Sox

MLB statistics
- Win–loss record: 0–0
- Earned run average: 15.43
- Strikeouts: 0
- Stats at Baseball Reference

Teams
- Chicago White Sox (1920)

Spencer Paul Heath (November 5, 1893 – January 25, 1930) was an American relief pitcher who played in four games for the Chicago White Sox during the 1920 season. Listed at 6 feet 0 inches (1.83 m) and 170 pounds (77 kg), Heath was a switch-hitter and threw right-handed.

Heath was born in Chicago, Illinois, where he lived much of his life. After one season of Minor League Baseball with the Winnipeg Maroons in 1919, he joined the White Sox in 1920. Though he was part of their Opening Day roster in April and stayed with the team through July, he only appeared in four games before the team released him. Afterwards, he played semipro baseball and worked for the Chicago Police Department before dying of double lobar pneumonia and influenza in 1930.

== Early life ==
Spencer Paul Heath was born on November 5, 1893, in Chicago, Illinois. His parents were Spencer and Agatha. Well-known around Chicago for his skills in semipro baseball, Heath played for Garden City, the Gunthers, and the Ciceros of the Chicago City League.

During World War I, Heath served his country at the Great Lakes Naval Base, working as an electrician. He also played on the base's baseball team. Heath was discharged following the war.

== Winnipeg Maroons (1919) ==
Heath played one season of minor league baseball for the Winnipeg Maroons of the Western Canada League in 1919. A pitcher, he appeared in 28 games, leading the circuit in wins as he posted an 18–8 record, good for a .692 winning percentage. That August, he was signed by the Chicago White Sox of the American League (AL), though he was not a part of their roster as they won the AL pennant and lost the World Series.

== Chicago White Sox (1920) ==
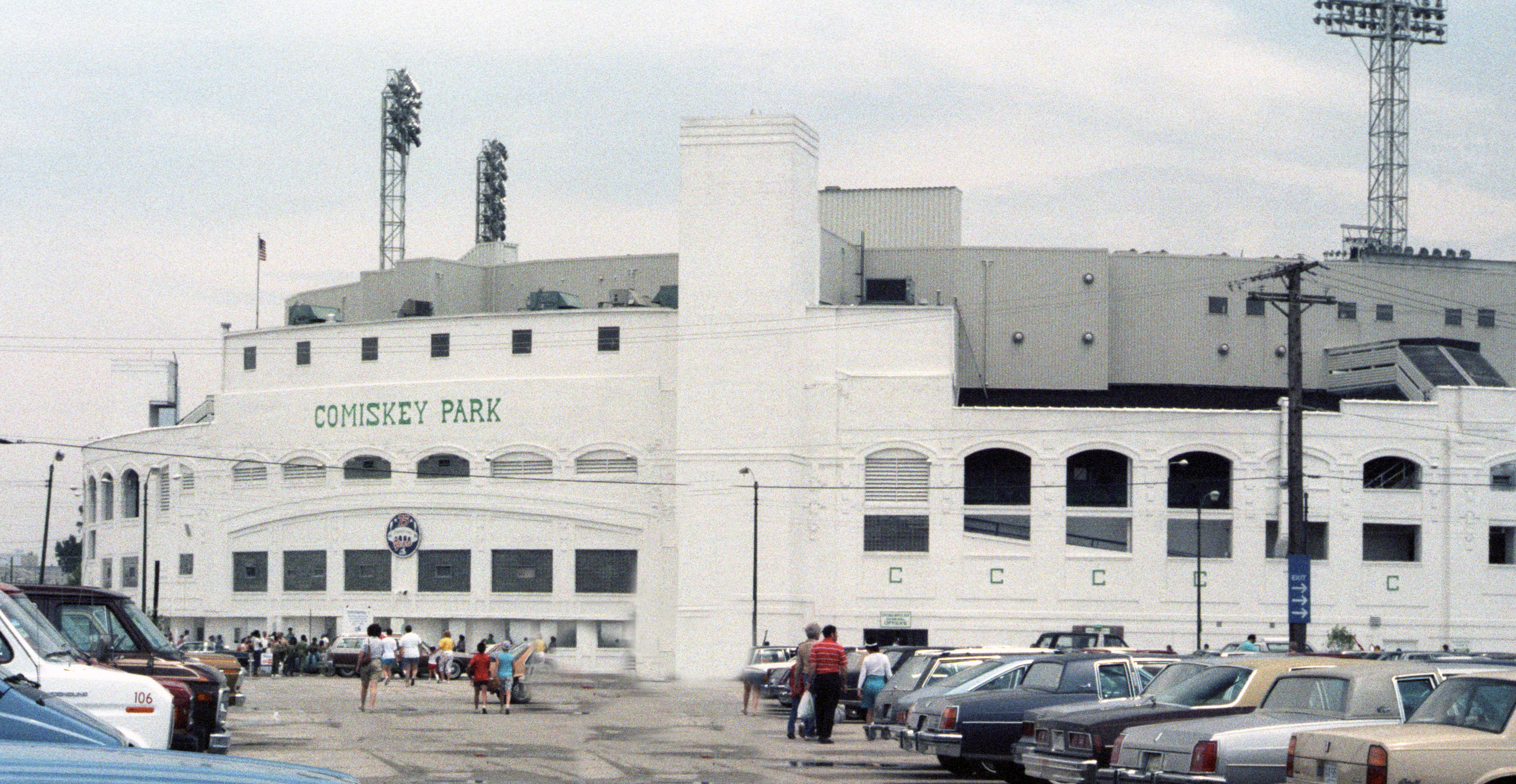
Though all four of his appearances came in away games, Heath's home stadium while with the White Sox was Comiskey Park.

At spring training for the first time with the White Sox in 1920, Heath pitched well enough to be named to the team's Opening Day roster. Baseball historian Frank Russo noted that this was difficult, considering that most of the pitchers on the pennant-winning team from the year before were returning. At 26, Heath was on a Major League Baseball (MLB) roster for the first time.

Heath made his major league debut on May 4, 1920, relieving Dickie Kerr with the bases loaded and Chicago trailing the St. Louis Browns 5–3 in the third inning. He induced Jimmy Austin to hit into a ground out, ending the inning. However, Heath went on to allow seven runs in three innings of work, including a home run to future Hall of Famer George Sisler. The Browns won 12–4 in a game that Russo described as a "debacle" for the White Sox.

The next two appearances for Heath came on back to back days, May 28 and 29, in a series against the Cleveland Indians. Called on to relieve Kerr again on May 28, Heath pitched the seventh and eighth innings. He was the last pitcher used by Chicago because there was no need for the Indians to bat in the ninth, as they were leading 13–6 following Chicago's final opportunity to score. Heath allowed just one run, and it was unearned, though the error was his own.

Heath's appearance on May 29 was the first game of a doubleheader. After White Sox starter Lefty Williams was pinch-hit for in the top of the fourth inning, Heath came on to pitch the bottom of it with his team down 6–1. Doubles by future Hall of Famer Tris Speaker and Larry Gardner led to a run, and another error by Heath ruined a pickoff attempt of Gardner at second base. Heath was replaced by George Payne to start the fourth. The White Sox continued to trail most of the game but scored five runs in the ninth to defeat Cleveland 8–7.

Nearly two months went by before Heath made another appearance on July 17. The White Sox were down 8–2 to the New York Yankees when Heath relieved Eddie Cicotte to start the sixth inning. He allowed three runs and had only recorded one out until Ping Bodie flew out to right field, and future Hall of Famer Babe Ruth was thrown out on his way back to first base to complete an inning-ending double play. Aaron Ward and Muddy Ruel each had hits against him to start the seventh inning, bringing up New York pitcher Carl Mays, who attempted to sacrifice bunt. Heath made another error allowing Mays to reach safely, though, and he was replaced by Payne after giving up a double to Roger Peckinpaugh. Ultimately, Heath would be charged with allowing seven runs (six earned) in one inning as the Yankees won 20–5.

The July 17 contest would be the last of Heath's MLB career, as he was released by the team shortly thereafter. In four relief appearances, Heath posted a 15.43 earned run average (ERA) in 7.0 innings of work, giving up 12 runs on 19 hits and two walks without recording a strikeout or a decision.

== Later years ==
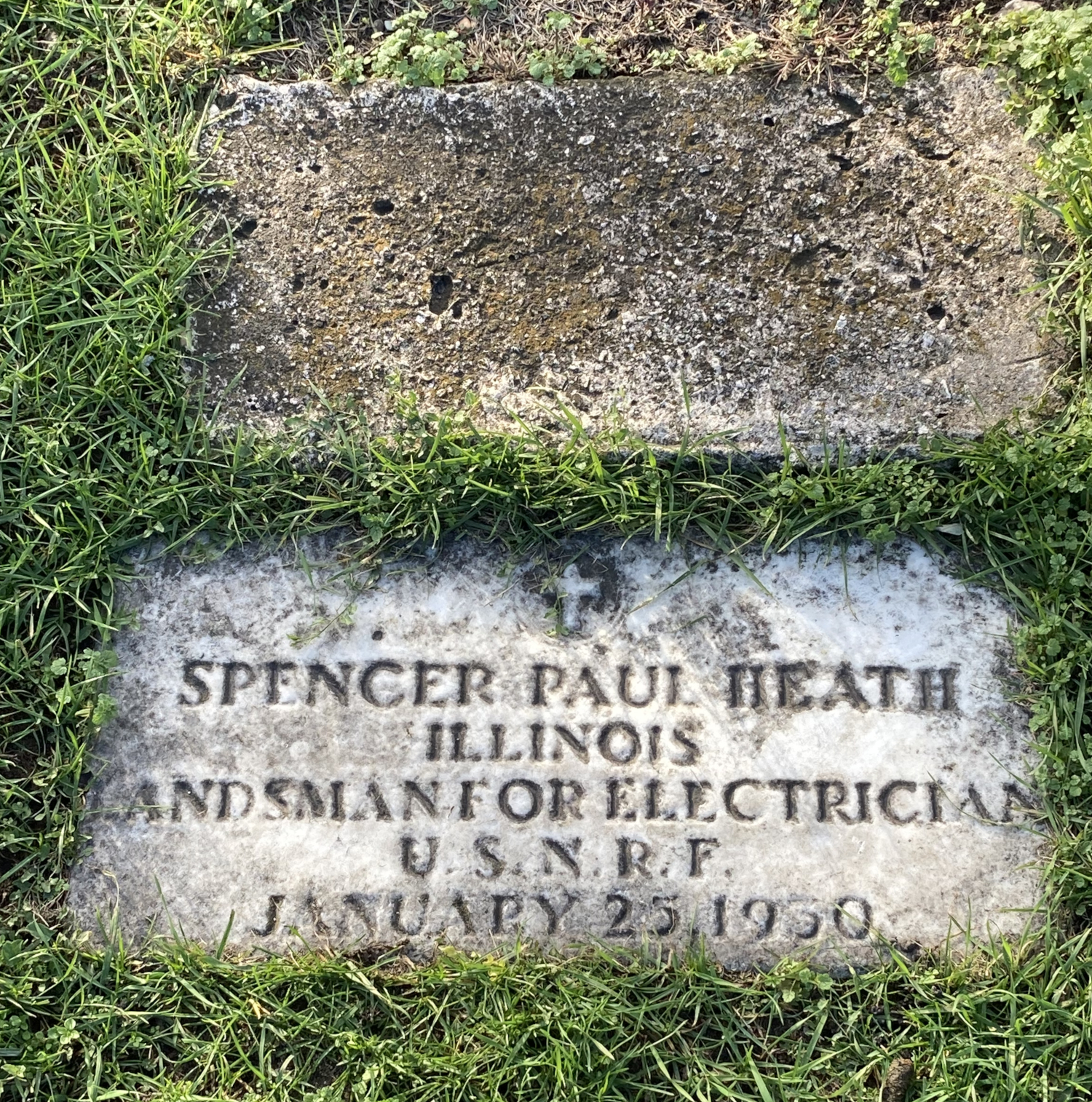
Heath's grave at St. Boniface Cemetery

Heath returned to playing semipro ball after his time with the White Sox. Then, he was hired by the Chicago Police Department. In 1930, an ill Heath was admitted to Edgewater Hospital in Chicago. On January 25, he died of double lobar pneumonia and influenza, which had been made worse by a cerebral hemorrhage. Unmarried at the time of his death, he was buried adjacent to his father at Chicago's St. Boniface Cemetery on January 29.

== See also ==
- 1920 Chicago White Sox season
