= Ernie Shore =

American baseball player (1891–1980)

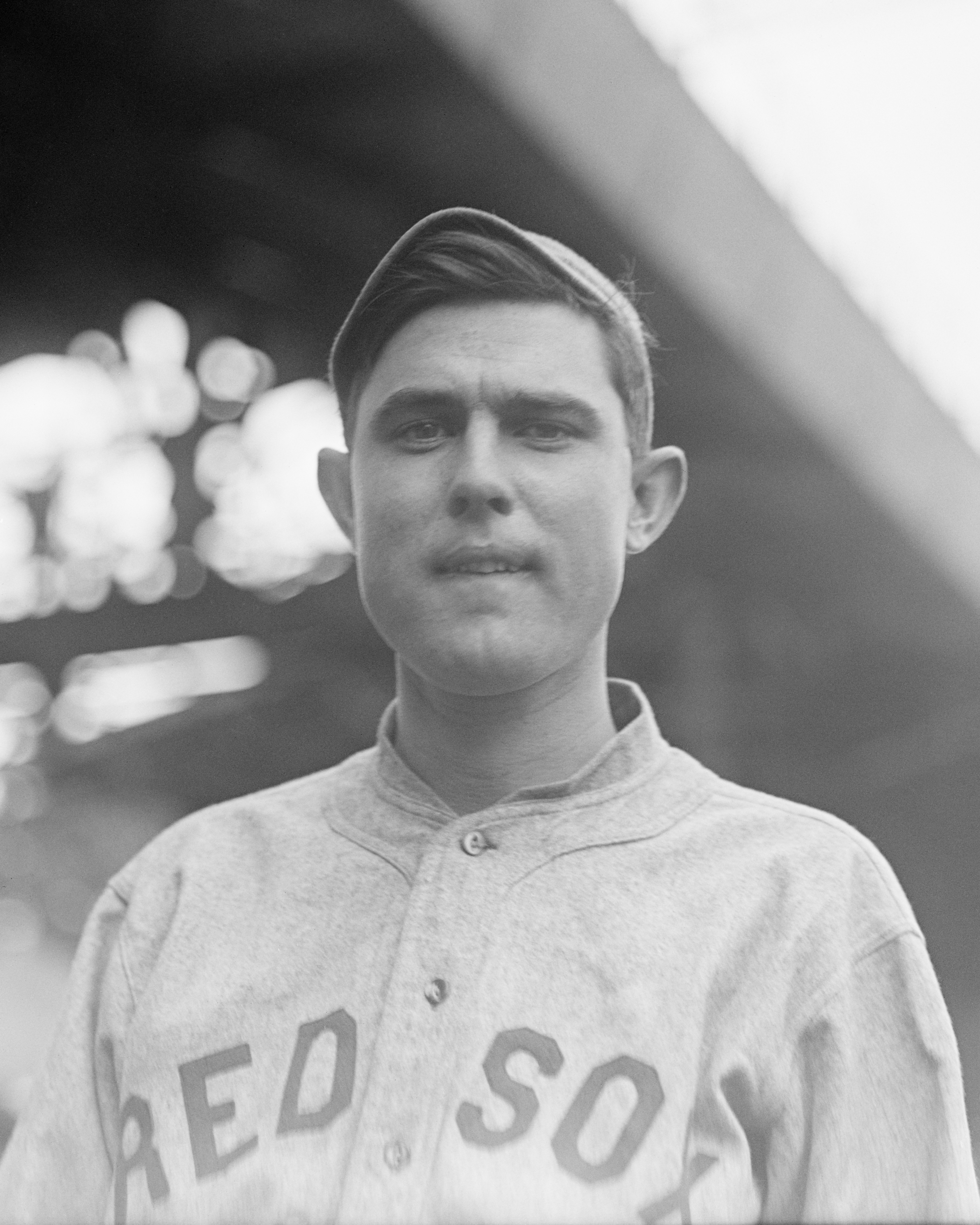
- Shore with the Boston Red Sox in 1915
- Pitcher
- Born: March 24, 1891; East Bend, North Carolina, U.S.
- Died: September 24, 1980 (aged 89); Winston-Salem, North Carolina, U.S.
- Batted: Right Threw: Right

MLB debut
- June 20, 1912, for the New York Giants

Last MLB appearance
- August 22, 1920, for the New York Yankees

MLB statistics
- Win–loss record: 65–43
- Earned run average: 2.47
- Strikeouts: 309
- Stats at Baseball Reference

Teams
- New York Giants (1912); Boston Red Sox (1914–1917); New York Yankees (1919–1920)

Career highlights and awards
- 2× World Series champion (1915, 1916); Pitched a combined no-hitter on June 23, 1917

Ernest Grady Shore (March 24, 1891 – September 24, 1980) was an American professional baseball pitcher. Shore played in Major League Baseball for the New York Giants of the National League in 1912, and in the American League for the Boston Red Sox from 1914 to 1917, and the New York Yankees from 1919 to 1920.

Shore was born and raised on a farm near East Bend, North Carolina, in 1891. He played college baseball for Guilford College when he received a trial with the Giants in 1912. After being released to the minor leagues, the Red Sox purchased Shore in 1914, and he helped them win the World Series in 1915 and 1916. Shore pitched a combined no-hitter with Babe Ruth on June 23, 1917. After missing the 1918 season due to his military service during World War I, the Red Sox traded Shore to the Yankees, but an arm injury he suffered with the Red Sox limited his effectiveness. Shore finished his playing career in the minor leagues during the 1921 season.

After retiring from baseball, Shore went into business in Winston-Salem, North Carolina, as a car salesman and insurance agent. He was elected sheriff of Forsyth County in 1936 and served in the role until 1970. Shore died in Winston-Salem in 1980.

== Early life ==
Ernest Grady Shore was born on March 24, 1891, in Yadkin County, North Carolina, near East Bend. He was the second of five sons born to Henry and Martha Shore. The Shores lived on a farm with over 200 acres (81 ha) of crops, but Ernie did not enjoy farming. Every Saturday, he went into East Bend or Forsyth County to play baseball as an outfielder for a local amateur team.

Shore enrolled at Guilford College in 1910, and he played college baseball for the Guilford Quakers as a pitcher under Chick Doak. He studied to become a civil engineer at Guilford and graduated in 1914. Shore continued to return to Guilford during baseball offseasons to serve as a math professor.

== Baseball career ==
=== Early career ===
In 1912, the New York Giants of the National League obtained Shore for a trial from Guilford. He traveled with the team during the summer, often pitching batting practice to Giants hitters. He made his major league debut on June 20 as a relief pitcher, replacing Hooks Wiltse in a 21–2 blowout against the Boston Braves. Shore allowed ten runs in the ninth inning, though only three were earned runs, as the Giants won 21–12. Giants manager John McGraw attempted to option Shore to the Indianapolis Indians of the Double-A American Association and wanted Shore to report to spring training with the Giants in 1913, but Shore refused and returned to Guilford. McGraw suspended Shore, who had to pay a $25 ($814 in current dollar terms) fine to the National Baseball Commission to be reinstated for the 1913 season.

After his junior year at Guilford, Shore pitched for the Greensboro Patriots of the Class D North Carolina State League in 1913, as Doak served as their manager. Shore had an 11–12 win–loss record and a 3.63 earned run average (ERA) for Greensboro. After the season, the Baltimore Orioles of the Double-A International League drafted Shore from Greensboro. Shore graduated from Guilford in June 1914 and reported to Baltimore on June 4. However, the Federal League, a major league, had debuted in 1914 with the Baltimore Terrapins competing directly with the Orioles; the Orioles struggled financially as they failed to draw fans to their games, forcing them to sell their best players. The Orioles sold Shore, Babe Ruth, and Ben Egan to the Boston Red Sox of the American League on July 9, reportedly for $11,000 ($353,571 in current dollar terms). With Baltimore, Shore won five games and lost three.

=== Boston Red Sox ===
In his Red Sox debut against the Cleveland Naps on July 14, 1914, Shore pitched a complete game, allowing two hits. For the Red Sox in the 1914 season, Shore won ten games and lost five, pitching to a 2.00 ERA. Shore started the Red Sox' Opening Day game in 1915. During the 1915 season, Shore pitched to a 19–8 win–loss record and a 1.64 ERA. The Red Sox won the American League pennant and faced the National League champion Philadelphia Phillies in the 1915 World Series. Shore started Game 1 for the Red Sox against Grover Cleveland Alexander, and lost by a score of 3–1. The Red Sox won the next two games. Shore faced George Chalmers in Game 4, which the Red Sox won by a score of 2–1. The Red Sox won Game 5 to win the series. Shore had a 2.12 ERA in 17 innings pitched in the series.

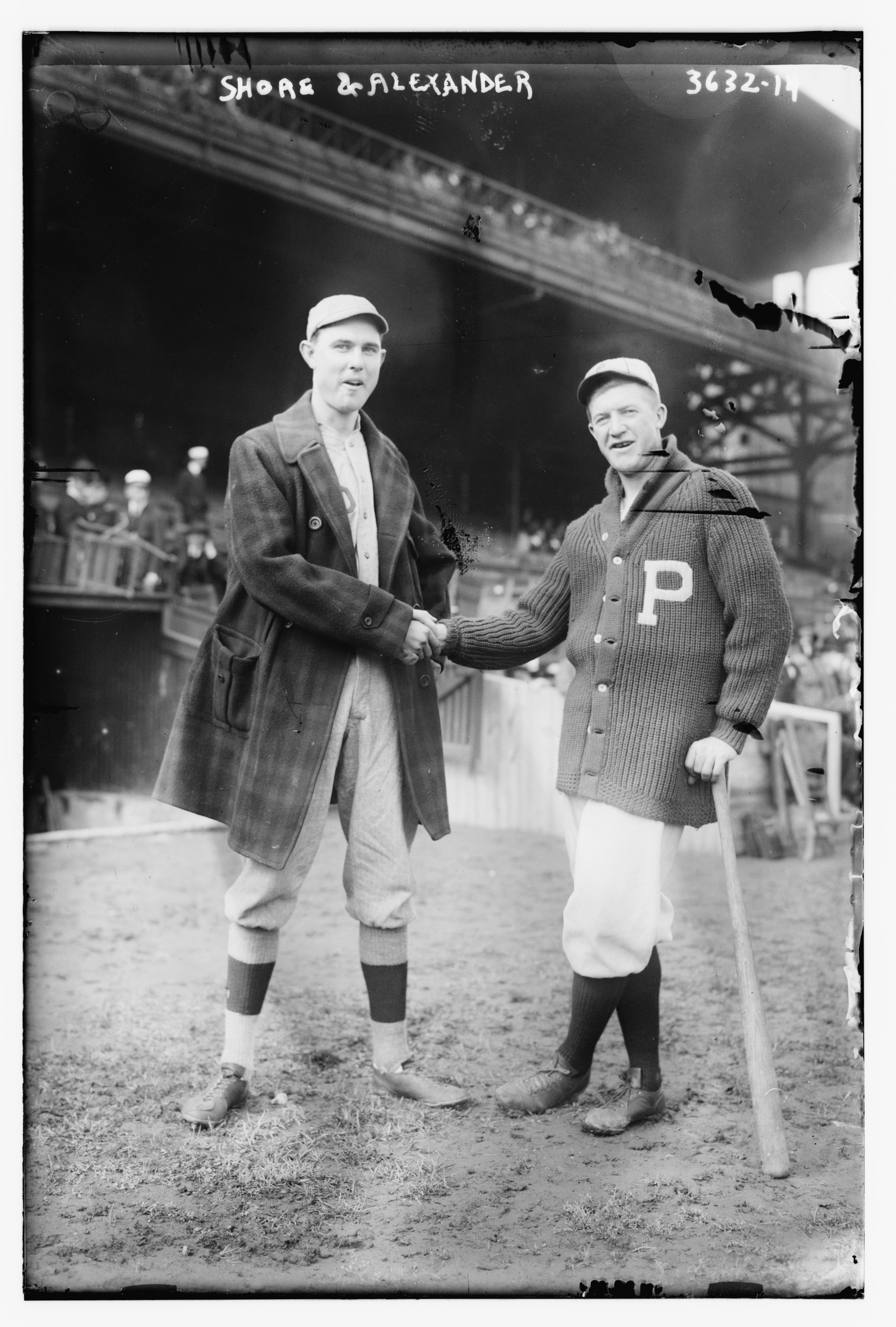
Shore (left) with Grover Cleveland Alexander during the 1915 World Series

In the 1916 season, Shore had a 16–10 win–loss record and a 2.63 ERA. The Red Sox again won the American League pennant and faced the Brooklyn Robins in the 1916 World Series. Shore started Game 1 against Rube Marquard. Leading the Robins by a score of 6–1 going into the ninth inning, Shore allowed three runs and was relieved by Carl Mays, who allowed another run, as the Red Sox held on to win by a score of 6–5. Shore started Game 5 against Jeff Pfeffer and allowed three hits to win the decisive game of the series as the Red Sox repeated as World Series champions. He allowed six runs, though only three of them were earned, in 17 1/3 innings pitched in the 1916 World Series. He recorded nine strikeouts while allowing four walks.

On June 23, 1917, the Red Sox played against the Washington Senators. Ruth was Boston's starting pitcher for the game, and he walked the Senators' first batter, Ray Morgan. As newspaper accounts of the time relate, Ruth argued with home plate umpire Brick Owens, who ejected Ruth from the game; the Red Sox' catcher, Pinch Thomas, was also ejected. Shore was brought in to pitch, coming in after he was allowed to throw only five warmup pitches. With a new pitcher and catcher entering the game, Morgan tried to steal second base and was thrown out by the new catcher, Slam Agnew. Shore then proceeded to retire the remaining 26 Senator batters without allowing a baserunner, completing a 4–0 Red Sox win. Will Harridge, the secretary of the American League, acknowledged Shore's feat as a no-hitter. and for many years, the game was listed in the record books as a perfect game. Debate over whether or not it should be considered a perfect game continued until Fay Vincent, commissioner of the major leagues, headed a committee on statistical accuracy in 1991 that clarified the definitions of a no-hitter and a perfect game. The committee determined that Shore did not pitch a perfect game, crediting the performance as a combined no-hitter. It was the first combined no-hitter in MLB history. Shore's nine innings of no-hit ball in a combined no-hitter is still an MLB record, with it being matched only by Francisco Cordova (who started his game) on July 12, 1997.

Later in the 1917 season, as the Red Sox were again contending for the American League pennant, pitcher Dutch Leonard broke his arm, leading the Red Sox to rely more on Shore in games. With the increased strain from his larger workload, Shore hurt his arm while throwing a curveball during a game in September against Cleveland. He continued to pitch through the injury, but later said that he experienced stabbing pains in his shoulder and that his throwing arm was never the same as it had been before the injury. Shore finished the 1917 season with a 13–10 win–loss record and a 2.22 ERA, and the Red Sox finished the 1917 season in second place in the American League behind the Chicago White Sox.

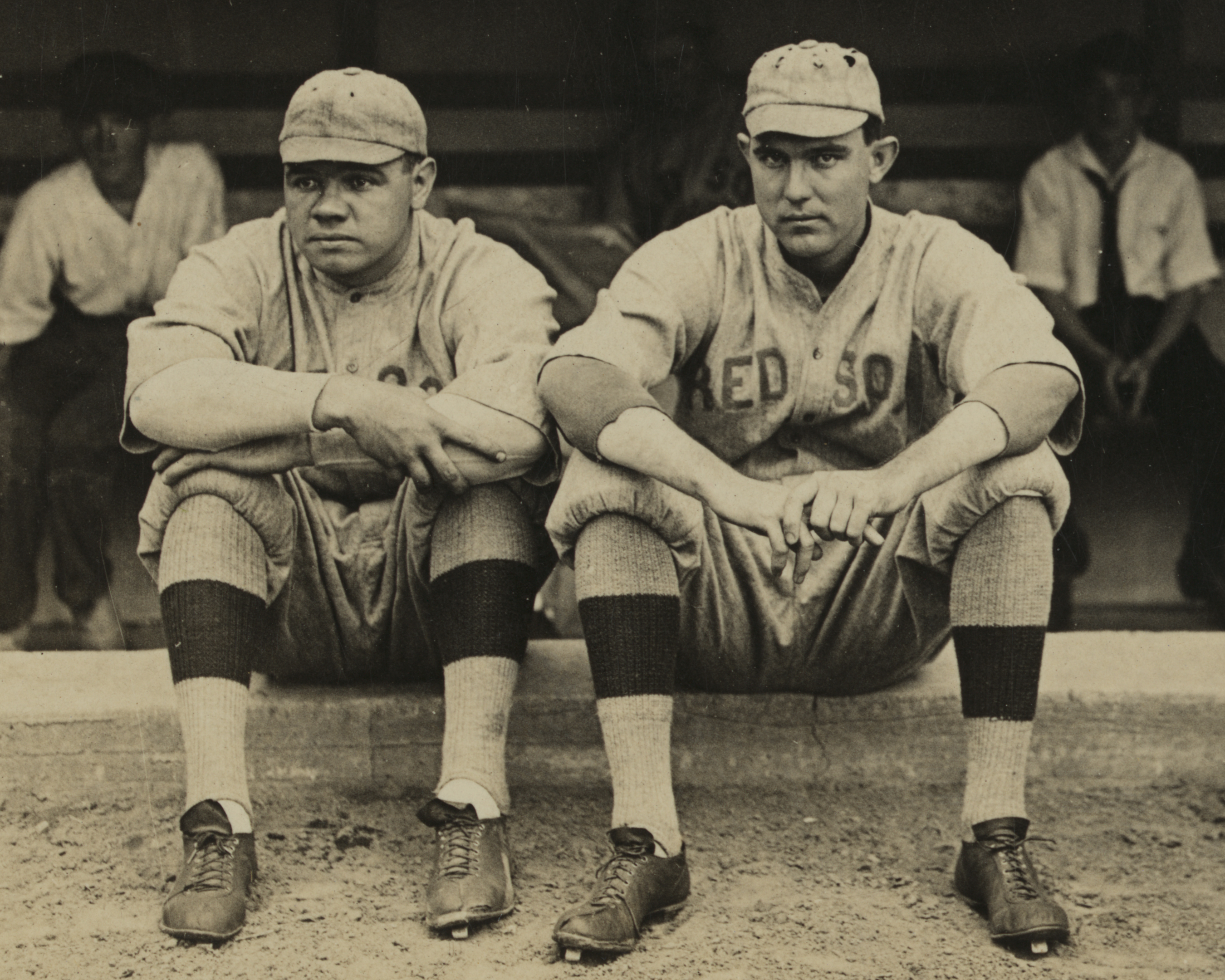
Shore (right) and Babe Ruth with the Red Sox

After the United States joined World War I, Shore enlisted in the United States Naval Reserves in August 1917. He remained with the Red Sox for the completion of the 1917 season and reported to the Navy in October. The Navy assigned Shore to the Boston Navy Yard, where he served as a yeoman in the office of the paymaster and joined other major league players who had enlisted in the Navy, such as Rabbit Maranville, Herb Pennock, Whitey Witt, Jack Barry, and Art Rico, in forming a baseball team that represented the naval yard, playing exhibition games. He did not play for the Red Sox during the 1918 season, as they won the 1918 World Series. After going through the training program at the Officers Material School at Harvard University, Shore was commissioned as an ensign in December 1918, becoming the only major league player who enlisted in the Navy during World War I to receive an officer's commission. As the war had ended, Shore was discharged from the Navy in January 1919.

=== New York Yankees and later career ===
On December 18, 1918, the Red Sox traded Shore, Leonard, and Duffy Lewis to the New York Yankees for Ray Caldwell, Frank Gilhooley, Slim Love, Roxy Walters, and $15,000 ($321,073 in current dollar terms). Shore contracted the mumps from teammate Ping Bodie and did not fully recover until after the season; he pitched to a 5–8 record and a 4.17 ERA for the Yankees during the 1919 season. Hoping to rebound in the 1920 season, Shore had a 2–2 record with a 4.87 ERA.

After the 1920 season, the Yankees sent Shore, Truck Hannah, Bob McGraw, and Ham Hyatt to the Vernon Tigers of the Double-A Pacific Coast League (PCL) in order to acquire Johnny Mitchell. Shore struggled with Vernon, who returned him to the Yankees in May. Rather than accept Shore, the Yankees sold him to the PCL's San Francisco Seals in June. Between Vernon and San Francisco, Shore won two games and lost five. Shore did not attempt to play in 1922. His rights reverted to Vernon, but Shore asked for and received his release from the Tigers. In seven major league seasons, Shore had a 65–43 win–loss record and a 2.47 ERA.

== Later life ==
Shore returned to Winston-Salem and opened a car dealership, selling Studebakers, Pontiacs, and Oakland Motor Car Company cars. He also joined with other citizens of Winston-Salem to purchase the Winston-Salem Twins, the city's minor league baseball team, and served as a director and business manager for the team. Car sales fell during the Great Depression, and Shore closed the dealership in 1931 after he fell into debt, owing approximately $20,000 ($423,414 in current dollar terms). He turned to selling insurance to make ends meet.

Seeking to get out of his debt, Shore ran for sheriff of Forsyth County, North Carolina, as a member of the Democratic Party in the June 1936 primary election. He finished the primary election in a close second place, trailing the incumbent sheriff, Guy Scott, and advanced to a runoff election against Scott in July. Shore defeated Scott in the runoff and won the November general election against the Republican Party candidate, receiving the largest margin of victory for a Democrat against a Republican in Forsyth County in the 1936 elections, including President Franklin D. Roosevelt. The department had six deputies when Shore became sheriff and expanded to 70 deputies by the time he retired. He also acquired the county's first patrol cars and became the first North Carolina sheriff to install two-way radios in their cars. Shore continued to win reelection every four years, with the issue of his age coming up in his 1962 and 1966 reelection campaigns. He won his reelection in 1966 by his smallest margin of victory. Shore chose not to run for reelection as sheriff in 1970, leaving office on December 7.

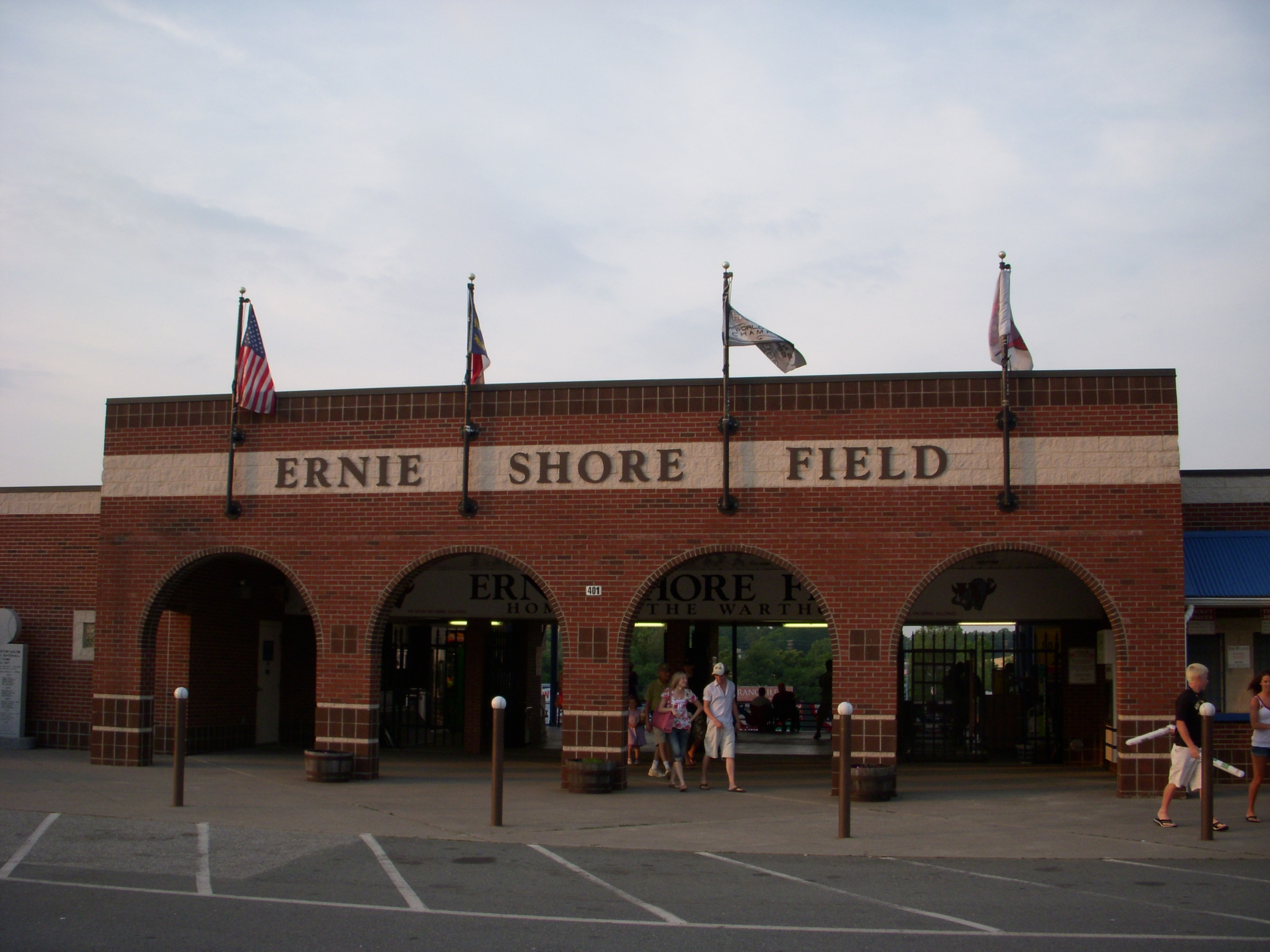
The exterior of Ernie Shore Field in 2008

Community leaders in Winston-Salem became concerned with the conditions of South Side Park, the home stadium of the Winston-Salem Twins, and Shore was appointed to an 18-member commission to look into building a new stadium in 1953. South Side Park was significantly damaged by a fire in 1955, and Shore led the effort to raise money to build a new stadium. His efforts raised $125,000 ($1,502,329 in current dollar terms) of the needed $200,000 ($2,403,727 in current dollar terms). After the remaining funds were raised, a new stadium was built. It was named Ernie Shore Field, and it opened in 1956. Ernie Shore Field remained in use as the professional baseball stadium for Winston-Salem's minor league franchise until 2009, when it was transferred to Wake Forest University and renamed.

In 1925, Shore met Lucille (née Henderson), a teacher from Spartanburg, South Carolina. They married the following year. The Shores had three children. Lucille taught fourth grade at Summit School in the 1960s.

Shore suffered a stroke in 1975 and was in poor health afterwards. Lucille died on June 17, 1980. Ernie died on September 24, 1980, in his home in Winston-Salem, at the age of 89. He was buried in Winston-Salem on September 26. Shore was the last surviving member of the 1915 and 1916 World Series-winning Boston Red Sox.

Achievements
Preceded by Bob Groom	No-hit game June 23, 1917 with Babe Ruth	Succeeded by Dutch Leonard
