= 1920 Chicago White Sox season =

1920 Chicago White Sox
- League: American League
- Ballpark: Comiskey Park
- City: Chicago, Illinois
- Record: 96–58 (.623)
- League place: 2nd
- Owners: Charles Comiskey
- Managers: Kid Gleason

The 1920 Chicago White Sox season was a season in American baseball.

The team was in contention to defend their American League pennant going into the final week of the season. However, for all intents and purposes, the season ended on September 26, when news of the Black Sox Scandal became public. The team finished with a record of 96–58, which was not only the best record during Comiskey's ownership (and the best finish of the Gleason era), but would remain a franchise record for the next 44 years until 1964 when the Sox won 98 games.

== Black Sox Scandal ==
Owner Charles Comiskey suspended the five players who were still active (the sixth, ringleader Chick Gandil, opted to retire after the 1919 season).

At that time, the White Sox were only a half-game behind the Cleveland Indians, but went 2–2 over their last four games to finish two games out.

They would not finish in the first division again until 1936.

== Historic Record in 1920 ==
The 1920 White Sox are one of only two teams in baseball history (The other being the 1971 Baltimore Orioles) to have four 20-game winners: Red Faber, Lefty Williams, Eddie Cicotte, and Dickie Kerr. (The '20 White Sox went one better than the '71 Orioles, in that they had four 21+ game winners.)

== Regular season ==
Shoeless Joe Jackson finished third in AL batting average, and Eddie Collins was fifth. Along with the St. Louis Browns, the team was the first in major league history to have three players with at least 200 hits each: Jackson, Collins, and Buck Weaver.

=== Season standings ===
American League
Team	W	L	Pct.	GB	Home	Road
Cleveland Indians	98	56	.636	—	51‍–‍27	47‍–‍29
Chicago White Sox	96	58	.623	2	52‍–‍25	44‍–‍33
New York Yankees	95	59	.617	3	49‍–‍28	46‍–‍31
St. Louis Browns	76	77	.497	21½	40‍–‍38	36‍–‍39
Boston Red Sox	72	81	.471	25½	41‍–‍35	31‍–‍46
Washington Senators	68	84	.447	29	37‍–‍38	31‍–‍46
Detroit Tigers	61	93	.396	37	32‍–‍46	29‍–‍47
Philadelphia Athletics	48	106	.312	50	25‍–‍50	23‍–‍56

=== Record vs. opponents ===
1920 American League record Sources:
Team	BOS	CWS	CLE	DET	NYY	PHA	SLB	WSH
Boston	—	12–10	6–16	13–9	9–13	13–9–1	9–13	10–11
Chicago	10–12	—	10–12	19–3	10–12	16–6	14–8	17–5
Cleveland	16–6	12–10	—	15–7	9–13	16–6	15–7	15–7
Detroit	9–13	3–19	7–15	—	7–15	12–10–1	10–12	13–9
New York	13–9	12–10	13–9	15–7	—	19–3	12–10	11–11
Philadelphia	9–13–1	6–16	6–16	10–12–1	3–19	—	8–14	6–16
St. Louis	13–9	8–14	7–15	12–10	10–12	14–8	—	12–9–1
Washington	11–10	5–17	7–15	9–13	11–11	16–6	9–12–1	—

=== Roster ===
1920 Chicago White Sox
Roster
Pitchers: Eddie Cicotte; Red Faber; Spencer Heath; Shovel Hodge; Dickey Kerr; Joe Kiefer; Grover Lowdermilk; George Payne; Roy Wilkinson; Lefty Williams	Catchers: Bubber Jonnard; Byrd Lynn; Ray Schalk; Infielders: Eddie Collins; Shano Collins; Ted Jourdan; Hervey McClellan; Fred McMullin; Swede Risberg; Buck Weaver	Outfielders: Bibb Falk; Happy Felsch; Joe Jackson; Nemo Leibold; Eddie Murphy; Amos Strunk	Manager: Kid Gleason

== Player stats ==
=== Batting ===
==== Starters by position ====
Note: Pos = Position; G = Games played; AB = At bats; H = Hits; Avg. = Batting average; HR = Home runs; RBI = Runs batted in

Pos	Player	G	AB	H	Avg.	HR	RBI
C	Ray Schalk	151	485	131	.270	1	61
1B	Shano Collins	133	495	150	.303	1	63
2B	Eddie Collins	153	602	224	.372	3	76
3B	Buck Weaver	151	629	208	.331	2	75
SS	Swede Risberg	126	458	122	.266	2	65
LF	Joe Jackson	146	570	218	.382	12	121
CF	Happy Felsch	142	556	188	.338	14	115
RF	Nemo Leibold	108	413	91	.220	1	28

==== Other batters ====
Note: G = Games played; AB = At bats; H = Hits; Avg. = Batting average; HR = Home runs; RBI = Runs batted in

Player	G	AB	H	Avg.	HR	RBI
Amos Strunk	53	188	45	.239	1	16
Ted Jourdan	48	150	36	.240	0	8
Fred McMullin	46	127	25	.197	0	13
Eddie Murphy	58	118	40	.339	0	19
Byrd Lynn	16	25	8	.320	0	3
Harvey McClellan	10	18	6	.333	0	5
Bibb Falk	17	17	5	.294	0	2
Bubber Jonnard	5	5	0	.000	0	0

=== Pitching ===
==== Starting pitchers ====
Note: G = Games pitched; IP = Innings pitched; W = Wins; L = Losses; ERA = Earned run average; SO = Strikeouts

Player	G	IP	W	L	ERA	SO
Red Faber	40	319.0	23	13	2.99	108
Eddie Cicotte	37	303.1	21	10	3.26	87
Lefty Williams	39	299.0	22	14	3.91	128

==== Other pitchers ====
Note: G = Games pitched; IP = Innings pitched; W = Wins; L = Losses; ERA = Earned run average; SO = Strikeouts

Player	G	IP	W	L	ERA	SO
Dickey Kerr	45	253.2	21	9	3.37	72
Roy Wilkinson	34	145.0	7	9	4.03	30
Shovel Hodge	4	19.2	1	1	2.29	5
Joe Kiefer	2	4.2	0	1	15.43	1

==== Relief pitchers ====
Note: G = Games pitched; W = Wins; L = Losses; SV = Saves; ERA = Earned run average; SO = Strikeouts

Player	G	W	L	SV	ERA	SO
George Payne	12	1	1	0	5.46	7
Spencer Heath	4	0	0	0	15.43	0
Grover Lowdermilk	3	0	0	0	6.75	0

The White Sox became the first team to have four 20-game winners in the same pitching rotation.

== League leaders ==
Happy Felsch

- #4 in AL in home runs (14)

Shoeless Joe Jackson

- #3 in AL in batting average (.382)
- #3 in AL in slugging percentage (.589)
- #4 in AL in runs batted in (121)
- #4 in AL in on-base percentage (.444)

Lefty Williams

- #2 in AL in strikeouts (128)
