= Ray Caldwell =

American baseball player (1888–1967)

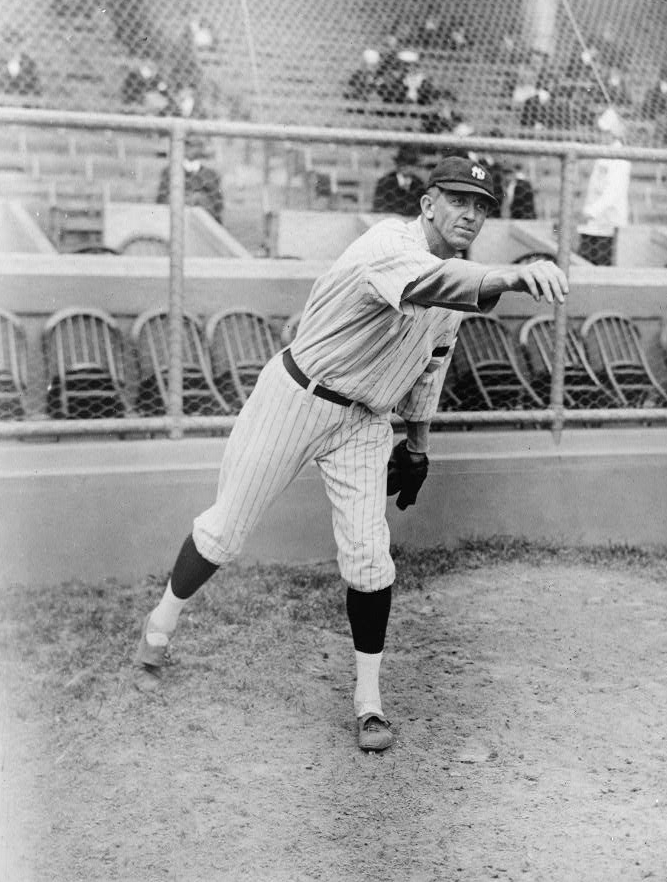
- Caldwell with the New York Yankees in 1918
- Pitcher
- Born: April 26, 1888; Corydon, Pennsylvania, U.S.
- Died: August 17, 1967 (aged 79); Salamanca, New York, U.S.
- Batted: Left Threw: Right

MLB debut
- September 9, 1910, for the New York Yankees

Last MLB appearance
- September 29, 1921, for the Cleveland Indians

MLB statistics
- Win–loss record: 134–120
- Earned run average: 3.22
- Strikeouts: 1,006
- Stats at Baseball Reference

Teams
- New York Highlanders/Yankees (1910–1918); Boston Red Sox (1919); Cleveland Indians (1919–1921)

Career highlights and awards
- World Series champion (1920); Pitched a no-hitter on September 10, 1919

Raymond Benjamin Caldwell (April 26, 1888 – August 17, 1967) was an American professional baseball pitcher who played in Major League Baseball for the New York Yankees, Boston Red Sox, and Cleveland Indians from 1910 to 1921. He was known for throwing the spitball, and he was one of the 17 pitchers allowed to continue throwing the pitch after it was outlawed in 1920.

Caldwell was notorious during his playing career for his addiction to alcohol and partying; he possessed a self-destructive streak that many of his contemporaries believed stopped him from reaching his potential. In 1924, Miller Huggins wrote: "Caldwell was one of the best pitchers that ever lived, but he was one of those characters that keep a manager in a constant worry. If he had possessed a sense of responsibility and balance, Ray Caldwell would have gone down in history as one of the greatest of all pitchers."

== Early life ==
Caldwell was born in the (now mostly abandoned) town of Corydon, Pennsylvania, located just south of the New York state line near Cattaraugus County. He was the son of Anna (née Archer) and Walter Caldwell. The family later moved to Salamanca in the same county where Ray grew up and completed high school.

== Playing career ==
He began his professional career with the McKeesport Tubers of the Ohio–Pennsylvania League in 1910 and recorded 18 wins before being signed by the New York Highlanders in September of that year. In his rookie season he went 14–14 with an earned run average of 3.35, he also recorded a batting average of .272 (during the course of the season he played 11 games in the outfield, and also made numerous appearances as a pinch hitter).

Persistent problems with his throwing arm led to a record of 8–16 and an earned run average of 4.47 in 1912. He regained his form the following year, going 9–8 with 2.41 earned run average for a newly renamed Yankees club that finished 37 games below .500. The 1914 season was the best of his career, going 17–9 with a 1.94 earned run average for another Yankees team that finished well below .500. During the course of the season he had numerous run-ins with manager Frank Chance, resulting in his being fined on several occasions for drunkenness and general poor conduct. Towards the end of the season, Caldwell asked team owner Frank Farrell to rescind his fines—which by that point accounted for a substantial proportion of his annual wages. Farrell, fearing that Caldwell would follow former teammates Russ Ford and Hal Chase in accepting an offer to pitch for the Buffalo Buffeds of the Federal League, agreed to let Caldwell off. As a consequence of this, Frank Chance, feeling that his authority had been irrevocably undermined, handed in his resignation as manager of the Yankees.

In 1915, Caldwell once again posted a winning record—19–16, with an earned run average of 2.89—for a Yankees team that finished 14 games below .500. He also contributed four home runs during the course of the season, enough to finish ninth in the American League in that category, despite having more than 200 fewer at bats than anyone else in the top 10.

The Yankees were a winning team in 1916, but Caldwell had major struggles, both on and off the field. His difficulties on the mound were not helped by his continuing to pitch with a broken patella. By the end of July his record was 5–12, and he had recorded an earned run average of 2.99. It was at this point that Caldwell, whose alcoholism had become increasingly pronounced during the course of the season, went AWOL. Bill Donovan, the Yankees manager—who prior to this had always turned a blind eye to Caldwell's personal problems—issued a fine and suspended him for two weeks. However, Caldwell failed to return to the club after this period had elapsed and he was suspended for the rest of the season.

Caldwell did not return to the Yankees until the following March, more than a week into spring training. His whereabouts during the intervening seven months, although much speculated on, were never revealed. Donovan and the Yankees owner, Til Huston, both of whom had strongly criticized Caldwell during his absence, decided to give him another chance, largely influenced by his apparent good condition. However, once again, his performances on the field were overshadowed somewhat by his actions off it. He finished the year 13–16 with a 2.86 earned run average for yet another Yankees team that finished well short of .500. During the course of the season he again served a team-imposed suspension for getting drunk and failing to report for duty. He was charged with grand larceny half-way through the season for allegedly stealing a ring, and was also taken to court by his wife, who sued for alimony after he abandoned her and their son.

In 1918, Caldwell once again failed to complete a season with the Yankees. Injuries hampered him on the mound, but he still managed to compile a batting average of .291 during 151 at-bats. Prior to leaving the club, Caldwell went 9–8 with an earned run average of 3.06. Caldwell left the Yankees in mid-August to join a shipbuilding firm in order to avoid military service after being picked in the draft. Joining a shipbuilding company was attractive to Caldwell, as it was for others, because it offered him the chance of playing baseball for the company rather than actually working on the assembly line. Despite this, the Yankees had not given Caldwell permission to leave the club mid-season and it was decided that he should be traded. In the winter of that year Caldwell was traded to the Boston Red Sox in a deal that also saw Duffy Lewis and Ernie Shore go the other way.

Caldwell was released by the Red Sox in July 1919 after a poor start to the season, in which he compiled an earned run average of 3.94 (his record, however, was 7–4). Caldwell finished the season with the Indians, managed by player-manager Tris Speaker. When he met Speaker to sign a contract, he was initially confused by the wording, as it did not tell him to avoid alcohol after pitching games. Speaker told him it was intentional, aiming for Caldwell to stick to a specific regimen: pitch, drink, sleep the hangover the next day, then come back for wind sprints two days later and batting practice the day after that. Caldwell was struck by lightning while playing for the Cleveland Indians against the Philadelphia Athletics on August 24, 1919; despite being knocked unconscious, he refused to leave the game, having pitched 8 2/3 innings, and went on to record the final out for the win. For the six starts Caldwell made that year with Cleveland, he went 5–1 with a 1.71 earned run average. This included the game where he was struck by lightning and a no-hitter against his former longtime teammates, the New York Yankees, on September 10.

In his first full season with the Indians, in 1920, Caldwell went 20–10, with a 3.86 earned run average. The Indians went on to win the World Series that year, although Caldwell's contribution to that success proved to be negligible. He started Game 3, but recorded just one out, having given up two hits, a walk, and an earned run, before being lifted by Tris Speaker (the Indians did not come back from this, and Caldwell was charged with the loss).

Caldwell's final season in the majors was in 1921, during which he primarily worked from the bullpen. His record was 6–6, with an earned run average of 4.90. After leaving the Indians, Caldwell went on to spend many years playing for various clubs in the minor leagues, including the Kansas City Blues and the Birmingham Barons. At the age of 43, Caldwell faced 21-year-old Houston Buffaloes star Dizzy Dean in the opening game of the 1931 Dixie Series, which Dean had promised to win. Writer Zipp Newman later dubbed the matchup "the strength of youth versus the guile of the years". Caldwell pitched a shutout and also knocked in the only run to give the Barons a 1–0 victory on the way to winning the series.

Caldwell's long-established reputation dissuaded any major league outfit from giving him another chance. Caldwell originally retired from professional baseball on April 20, 1933, having requested such from the Barons. However, he signed with the Charlotte Hornets in July to attempt a comeback. By September, he had been named manager of the Keokuk Indians of the Mississippi Valley League, replacing Ed Sicking.

Caldwell was a very good hitting pitcher in his career, posting a .248 batting average (289-for-1164) with 138 runs, eight home runs, 114 RBIs and 78 base on balls. He had 10 or more RBI in a season six times, with a career high 20 RBI with the 1915 New York Yankees. He also played at all three outfield positions and first base in the majors.

== Later life ==
Caldwell bought a farm in Frewsburg in 1940 and worked at the train station at Ashville as a telegrapher for the Buffalo, Rochester and Pittsburgh Railway. He later worked as a steward and bartender at the Lakewood Rod & Gun Club, where his fourth wife, Estelle, was a cook.

Gordon Cobbledick, the sports of editor of Cleveland newspaper The Plain Dealer, noted in his "Plain Dealing" column on April 23, 1961 that Caldwell had been suffering from cataracts and did not have the money for surgery to restore his eyesight. After reading the column, executives at the Cleveland Academy of Medicine discussed offering Caldwell the surgery free of charge the next day. The executive committee called Caldwell at his home in Onoville, New York and offered it to him, which he accepted. Caldwell was overcome with emotion on the phone call, wondering how to thank the doctors that would restore his eyesight without cost. Caldwell, who had performed free baseball clinics in 1959 and 1960 in Fremont, Ohio, where one of his children lived, was afraid blindness would prevent him from doing them any further. Dr. Charles Thomas of the Academy and ophthalmology professor at Western Reserve University would be the one performing the surgery in May 1961. Thomas had previous operated on Herb Score after he was hit by a line drive and it damaged his eyesight 1957.

The Randolph, New York branch of Lions Clubs International and Caldwell's neighbors were working to raise money for surgery for Caldwell to have surgery on one eye at the cost of $500, including scheduling a chicken barbecue at the Grange Hall in Randolph on May 7, 1961. With the change of plans, the Lions Club noted that they want to be in a position to pay for all the expenses, noting they would need more than $500 because he would be in the hospital for almost three weeks and dealing with traveling expenses and living expenses attached to the surgery. High ticket demand resulted in having to move the barbecue from the Grange Hall to Randolph High School. Other Lions Club lodges offered to help, knowing their goal was an indeterminate number. In addition to the offer from the Cleveland Academy of Medicine, Cobbledick's column resulted in readers sending checks and cash to his office, which would be forwarded. The money sent to Cobbledick would then be forwarded to the Lions Club in Randolph. A doctor in Dover, Ohio also offered to perform the surgery for free, but the services of the Academy had already been accepted.

The chicken barbecue on May 7 was considered a success, with 300 people attending the dinner and raise money for Caldwell. Caldwell, went to War Memorial Stadium in Buffalo, New York on May 4 to attend the Buffalo Bisons home opener. Despite the cataracts blurring his vision, he felt the festive atmosphere about his upcoming surgery and the offer from the Academy. In addition to the free surgery, the Cleveland Academy of Medicine agreed to have Ray admitted as a "staff patient", meaning the costs of his time in the hospital would be lower than a regular patient. Caldwell expected that he would leave for Cleveland on May 14 for his surgery.

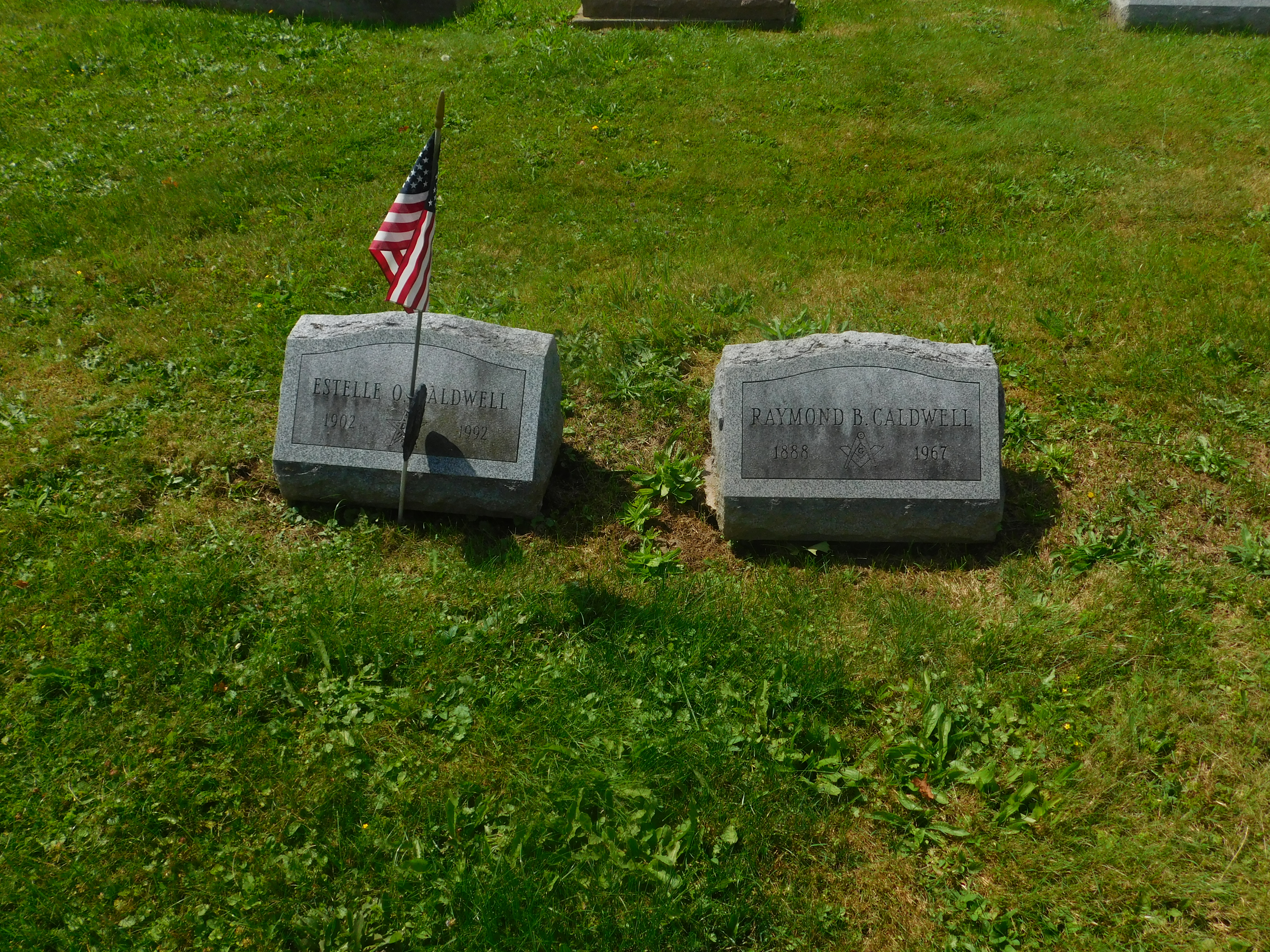
Caldwell's grave in Randolph, New York, with his wife Estelle's on the left in August 2017

Dr. Thomas operated on Caldwell's right eye on May 16 at Lakeside Hospital in Cleveland. One of Caldwell's daughters told The News-Messenger, a newspaper in Fremont, that the operation had been a success and that he had good vision after the surgery was complete. She stated that Caldwell would have a second surgery in ten days time on the left eye, necessitating the 20 days in the hospital. An optical firm in Cleveland also offered to produce new glasses for the retired pitcher, ones designed for his new eyesight. At the time of surgery, Caldwell could only see large objects with his blurred vision. After the surgery, he wore a patch on his right eye, which would be removed for short periods. With a long healing process and fitting of new glasses, Caldwell would not know the full results of the surgery until later on. Caldwell was allowed to check out and spend a weekend with one of his granddaughters, Jean DeFranko of Garfield Heights, who had just gotten married. During his time in the hospital, Bill Wambsganss and George Uhle, teammates on the 1920 Cleveland Indians team, visited him at the hospital. Uhle, Wambsganss and Caldwell talked about how modern players struggled to get past the seventh inning and fall behind batters. He was also given stacks of get-well cards. The surgery on the left eye would be held off until Dr. Thomas deemed it necessary, but he could not leave Cleveland until meeting with Dr. Thomas on May 31. He also called Lefty Grove while in Norwalk, Ohio and asked him to do the baseball clinic in Fremont for 1961 as he would be unable to.

Caldwell returned to Cleveland in September 1961, having surgery on September 29 on his left eye. The results of the surgery on May 16 resulted in 20/25 vision in the right eye. Due to the high publicity around his first surgery, Caldwell also got his old Dixie Series ring from 1931 that had been in possession of a former barnstorming teammate since 1933. The second surgery was also called a success and Caldwell returned to having eyesight in both eyes. He would return to Onoville on the weekend of October 14, 1961 with new eyesight.

Caldwell died on August 17, 1967 at Salamanca District Hospital in Salamanca, New York. He was 79 years old. Caldwell had been ill since May 1967, diagnosed with lung cancer, and had spent three weeks in the hospital prior to his death at Roswell Park Memorial Hospital in Buffalo. He was survived by his wife, Estelle (née Sheppard), a son, four daughters, grandchildren and great-grandchildren. His funeral service was held at Hoitink Mortuary in Randolph, where he would also be buried. He was inducted into the Chautauqua Sports Hall of Fame in 2010.

== See also ==
- List of Major League Baseball no-hitters

== Notes ==
Preceded by Hod Eller	No-hitter pitcher September 10, 1919	Succeeded by Walter Johnson
