= Unionville, Massac County, Illinois =

Unionville, Illinois
- Unincorporated community
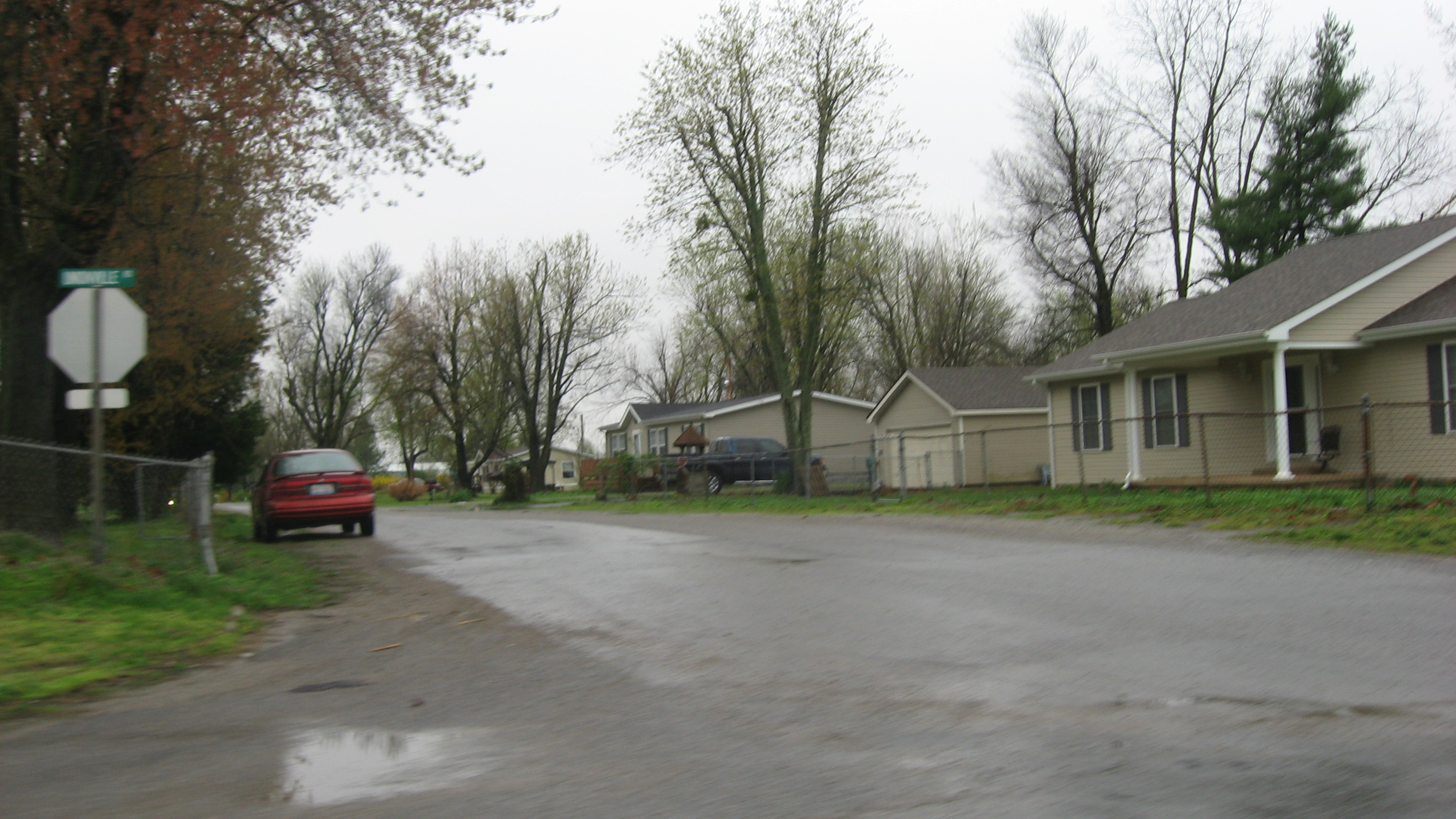
- Houses on Mount Sterling Road

- Location within Illinois Location within the United States
- Coordinates: 37°07′20″N 88°32′48″W
- Country: United States
- State: Illinois
- County: Massac
- Elevation: 371 ft (113 m)
- Time zone: UTC-6 (Central (CST))
  - Summer (DST): UTC-5 (CDT)
- Area code: 618
- GNIS feature ID: 420146

Unionville is an unincorporated community in Massac County, Illinois, United States. Unionville is 4.5 miles (7.2 km) east of Brookport.

A post office named Unionville operated from 1865 to 1929.

== See also ==
- Byrd Lynn
