= Harry Lunte =

American baseball player (1892–1965)

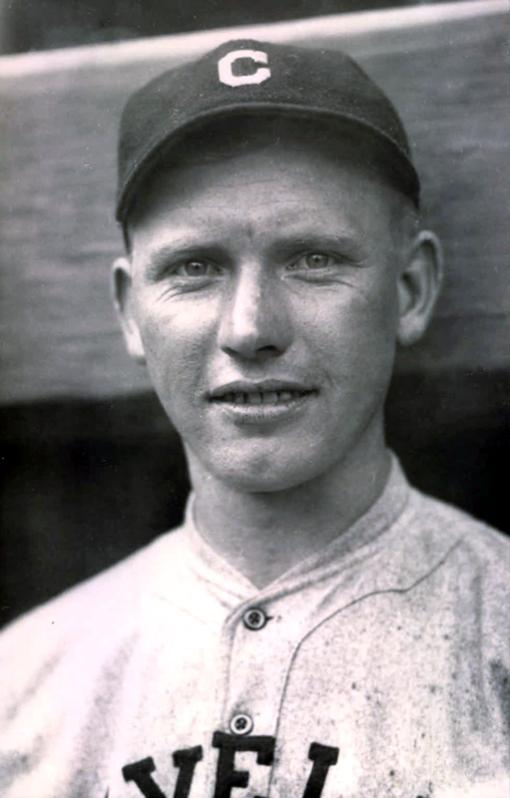
- Shortstop
- Born: September 15, 1892; St. Louis, Missouri, U.S.
- Died: July 27, 1965 (aged 72); St. Louis, Missouri, U.S.
- Batted: Right Threw: Right

MLB debut
- May 19, 1919, for the Cleveland Indians

Last MLB appearance
- September 23, 1920, for the Cleveland Indians

MLB statistics
- Batting average: .196
- Home runs: 0
- Runs batted in: 9
- Stats at Baseball Reference

Teams
- Cleveland Indians (1919–1920)

Career highlights and awards
- World Series champion (1920)

Harry August Lunte (September 15, 1892 – July 27, 1965) was an American Major League Baseball shortstop. Lunte played for the Cleveland Indians in the 1919 and 1920 seasons. In 49 career games, Lunte had 29 hits, nine RBIs, two doubles, and a .196 batting average. Lunte was a member of the 1920 World Series championship team.

Lunte was the pinch runner for shortstop Ray Chapman after Chapman was hit in the head by a pitch thrown by New York Yankees pitcher Carl Mays on August 16, 1920. Chapman died the next day.

Born in St. Louis, Missouri, Lunte died at his home on July 27, 1965 in north St. Louis.
