= Byrd Lynn =

American baseball player (1889–1940)

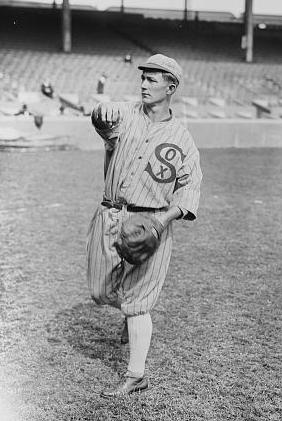
- Lynn in 1919
- Catcher
- Born: March 13, 1889; Unionville, Illinois, U.S.
- Died: February 5, 1940 (aged 50); Napa, California, U.S.
- Batted: Right Threw: Right

MLB debut
- April 16, 1916, for the Chicago White Sox

Last MLB appearance
- October 1, 1920, for the Chicago White Sox

MLB statistics
- Batting average: .237
- Home runs: 0
- Runs batted in: 15
- Stats at Baseball Reference

Teams
- Chicago White Sox (1916–1920)

Career highlights and awards
- World Series champion (1917)

Byrd "Birdie" Lynn (March 13, 1889 – February 5, 1940) was an American Major League Baseball catcher from 1916 to 1920. During that time, he played for the Chicago White Sox and was the back-up to Hall of Fame catcher Ray Schalk.

In 116 career games, Lynn had 211 at-bats, with 50 hits, for a .237 batting average. He won American League pennants with the White Sox in 1917 and 1919. Lynn had just one at-bat in each of those year's World Series and did not get a hit.
