= Hack Eibel =

American baseball player (1893–1945)

- Outfielder / Pitcher
- Born: December 6, 1893; Brooklyn, New York, U.S.
- Died: October 16, 1945 (aged 51); Macon, Georgia, U.S.
- Batted: Left Threw: Left

MLB debut
- June 13, 1912, for the Cleveland Naps

Last MLB appearance
- July 17, 1920, for the Boston Red Sox

MLB statistics
- Batting average: .174
- Home runs: 0
- Runs batted in: 6
- Earned run average: 3.48
- Innings pitched: 10 1/3
- Games Finished: 2
- Stats at Baseball Reference

Teams
- Cleveland Naps (1912); Boston Red Sox (1920)

Henry Hack Eibel (December 6, 1893 – October 16, 1945) was an American utility player in Major League Baseball who played for the Cleveland Naps (1912) and Boston Red Sox (1920). Listed at 5 ft 11 in (1.80 m) and 220 lb., Eibel batted and threw left-handed. He was born in Brooklyn, New York to emigrant parents of German extraction. Eibel first played in the majors at the age of 18.

During his brief major league career, Eibel did almost everything a player was asked to do, appearing in 30 games, as a relief pitcher (3 games), left fielder (3), right fielder (3), first baseman (1), and pinch-hitter or pinch-runner (20).

In a two-season career, Eibel was a .174 hitter (8-for-43) with four runs and six RBI, including two doubles and one stolen base. He did not hit a home run. In three relief appearances, he posted a 3.48 ERA with five strikeouts and three walks in 10⅓ innings and did not have a decision.

Eibel shot himself to death in Macon, Georgia at age 51. Macon was also the town of Eibel's final professional ball club team. Eibel retired from baseball in 1924.

== Sources ==
- Baseball Reference
