= Hal Deviney =

American baseball player (1893–1933)

- Pitcher
- Born: April 11, 1893; Newton, Massachusetts, U.S.
- Died: January 4, 1933 (aged 39); Westwood, Massachusetts, U.S.
- Batted: Right Threw: Right

MLB debut
- July 30, 1920, for the Boston Red Sox

Last MLB appearance
- July 30, 1920, for the Boston Red Sox

MLB statistics
- Win–loss record: 0–0
- Earned run average: 15.00
- Strikeouts: 0
- Stats at Baseball Reference

Teams
- Boston Red Sox (1920)

Harold John Deviney (April 11, 1893 – January 4, 1933) was an American relief pitcher in Major League Baseball who played in one game for the Boston Red Sox during the 1920 season. He batted and threw right-handed.

On July 30, 1920, Deviney posted a 15.00 earned run average with three walks in 3.0 innings of work. He did not have a decision. But Deviney had more luck at the plate, going 2-for-2 with one run and a triple for a perfect 1.000 batting average. He never appeared in a major league game again.

Deviney died in Westwood, Massachusetts at age 39.

== See also ==
- Boston Red Sox all-time roster
