= Tim Hendryx =

American baseball player (1891–1957)

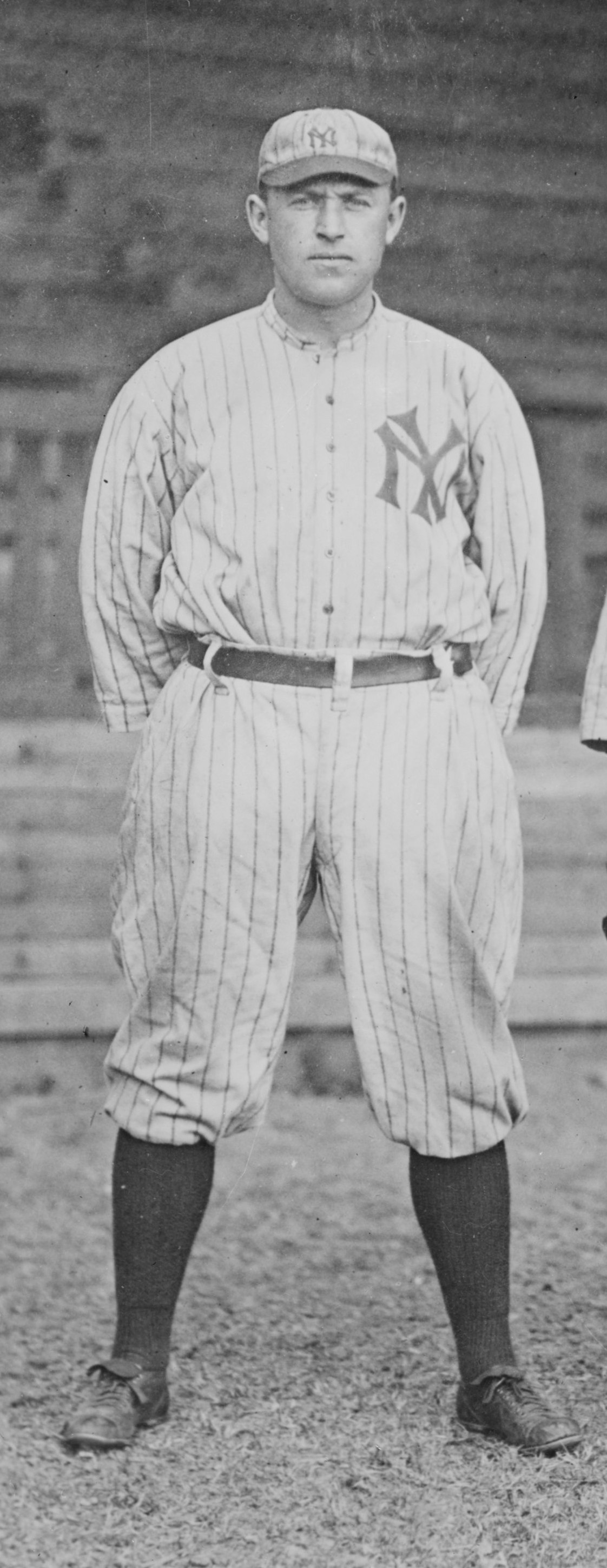
- Outfielder
- Born: January 31, 1891; Le Roy, Illinois, U.S.
- Died: August 14, 1957 (aged 66); Corpus Christi, Texas, U.S.
- Batted: Right Threw: Right

MLB debut
- September 4, 1911, for the Cleveland Naps

Last MLB appearance
- July 26, 1921, for the Boston Red Sox

MLB statistics
- Batting average: .276
- Home runs: 6
- Runs batted in: 192
- Stats at Baseball Reference

Teams
- Cleveland Naps (1911–1912); New York Yankees (1915–1917); St. Louis Browns (1918); Boston Red Sox (1920–1921)

Timothy Green Hendryx (January 31, 1891 – August 14, 1957) was an American professional baseball outfielder. He played in Major League Baseball with four different teams between the 1911 and 1921 seasons. In an eight-season career, Hendryx was a .276 hitter (356-for-1291) with six home runs and 192 RBI in 416 games, including 152 runs, 68 doubles, 22 triples, 26 stolen bases, and a .372 on-base percentage.

== Early life ==
Hendryx was one of six children born to William, a stonecutter, and, Nancy. He was born and raised in Le Roy, Illinois, then moved to Jacksonville, Florida. There, he began his professional baseball career in 1911 with the Yazoo City Zoos of the Cotton States League. He primarily played third base for Yazoo City, but was used as a utility player and gained experience at every position. In August, Cleveland Naps scout Bob Gilks watched him play a few games, and recommended him to owner Charles Somers, who signed him to a contract.

== Cleveland Naps and minor leagues ==
Hendryx made his major league debut on September 4, 1911, for the Naps, playing for them two consecutive years. He played four games for them that season as a third baseman, getting two hits in seven at-bats.

== New York Yankees and St. Louis Browns ==
He before joined the New York Yankees in 1915. In 1917, for the Yankees, he recorded 215 outs and 17 assists in a career-high 125 games.

He later played for the St. Louis Browns (1918).

== Boston Red Sox and later career ==
He also played for the Boston Red Sox (1920–1921). His most productive season came with the 1920 Red Sox, when he posted a .328 batting average with 54 runs and 73 RBI –all career-high numbers, while appearing in 99 games.

== Later life ==
After baseball, Hendryx became a taxi driver and paint contractor. A resident of Corpus Christi, Texas since 1928, Hendryx had been ill for several weeks, leading to August 1957. He died at his home in Corpus Christi on the morning of August 14, 1957 of a heart attack at age 66.
