= Tom Connelly =

American baseball player (1897–1941)

- Outfielder
- Born: October 20, 1897; Chicago, Illinois, U.S.
- Died: February 18, 1941 (aged 43); Hines, Illinois, U.S.
- Batted: Left Threw: Right

MLB debut
- September 24, 1920, for the New York Yankees

Last MLB appearance
- July 21, 1921, for the New York Yankees

MLB statistics
- Batting average: .167
- Home runs: 0
- RBI: 0
- Stats at Baseball Reference

Teams
- New York Yankees (1920–1921)

Thomas Martin Connelly (October 20, 1897 – February 18, 1941) was an American outfielder in Major League Baseball who played five games in 1920 and 1921 for the New York Yankees. He was born in Chicago, Illinois. In his career, he failed to hit any home runs, had no runs batted in, and batted .167. He died at age 43 in Hines, Illinois.
