= Bob Clark (pitcher) =

American baseball player (1897–1944)

- Pitcher
- Born: August 22, 1897; Newport, Pennsylvania, U.S.
- Died: May 18, 1944 (aged 46); Carlsbad, New Mexico, U.S.
- Batted: Right Threw: Right

MLB debut
- May 26, 1920, for the Cleveland Indians

Last MLB appearance
- September 25, 1921, for the Cleveland Indians

MLB statistics
- Win–loss record: 1–2
- Earned run average: 5.44
- Strikeouts: 10
- Stats at Baseball Reference

Teams
- Cleveland Indians (1920–1921)

Robert William Clark (August 22, 1897 – May 18, 1944) was an American Major League Baseball pitcher who played for two seasons. He played for the Cleveland Indians from 1920 to 1921.
