= George Ellison (baseball) =

American baseball player (1897–1978)

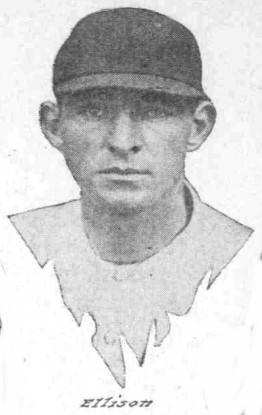
- Pitcher
- Born: January 24, 1897; San Francisco, California
- Died: January 20, 1978 (aged 80); San Francisco, California
- Batted: Right Threw: Right

MLB debut
- August 21, 1920, for the Cleveland Indians

Last MLB appearance
- August 21, 1920, for the Cleveland Indians

MLB statistics
- Win–loss record: 0-0
- Strikeouts: 1
- Earned run average: 0.00
- Stats at Baseball Reference

Teams
- Cleveland Indians (1920)

George Russell Ellison (January 24, 1897 – January 20, 1978) was a Major League Baseball pitcher. He pitched one inning for the Cleveland Indians in 1920. On August 21, he came into a game during a doubleheader against the Boston Red Sox, walking two batters and striking out one without allowing a hit or a run.

== Sources ==
- Career statistics from Baseball Reference, or Baseball Reference (Minors)
