= Roxy Walters =

American baseball player (1892–1956)

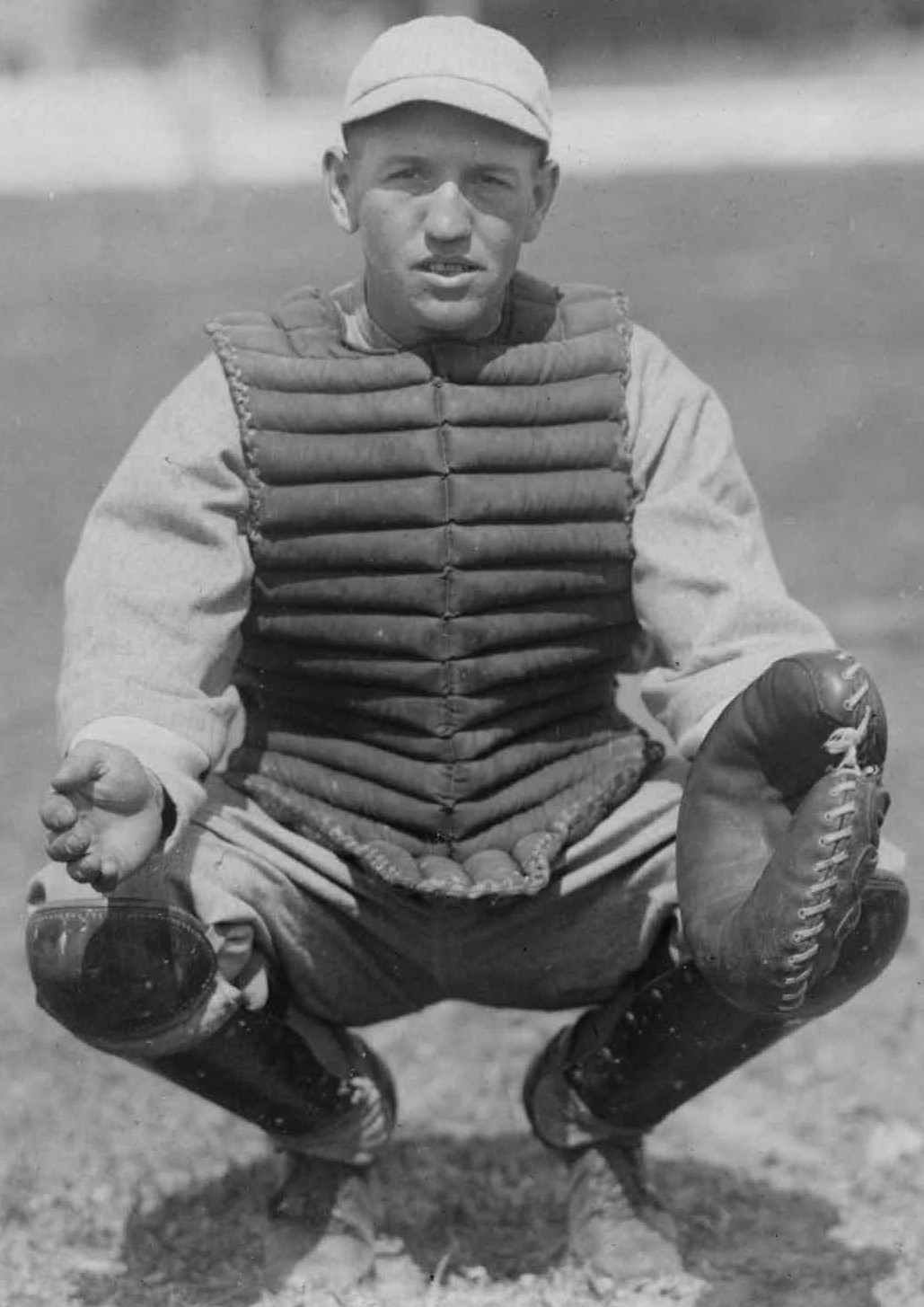
- Catcher
- Born: November 5, 1892; San Francisco, California, U.S.
- Died: June 3, 1956 (aged 63); Alameda, California, U.S.
- Batted: Right Threw: Right

MLB debut
- September 16, 1915, for the New York Yankees

Last MLB appearance
- June 29, 1925, for the Cleveland Indians

MLB statistics
- Batting average: .222
- Home runs: 0
- RBI: 117
- Stats at Baseball Reference

Teams
- New York Yankees (1915–1918); Boston Red Sox (1919–1923); Cleveland Indians (1924–1925)

Alfred John Walters (November 5, 1892 – June 3, 1956) born in San Francisco, California, was an American catcher in Major League Baseball for the New York Yankees (1915–18), Boston Red Sox (1919–23) and Cleveland Indians (1924–25).

== Biography ==
He was born on November 5, 1892, in San Francisco, California.

In 11 seasons, he played in 498 Games, and had 1,426 At Bats, 119 Runs, 317 Hits, 41 Doubles, 6 Triples, 117 RBI, 13 Stolen Bases, 97 Walks, .222 Batting Average, .281 On-base percentage, .259 Slugging Percentage, 370 Total Bases and 58 Sacrifice Hits.

He died on June 3, 1956, in Alameda, California, at the age of 63.

== Sources ==
- Career statistics from Baseball Reference · Baseball Reference (Minors) · Retrosheet · Baseball Almanac
