= Paddy Smith (baseball) =

American baseball player (1894–1990)

- Catcher
- Born: May 16, 1894; Pelham, New York, U.S.
- Died: December 2, 1990 (aged 96); New Rochelle, New York, U.S.
- Batted: Left Threw: Right

MLB debut
- July 6, 1920, for the Boston Red Sox

Last MLB appearance
- July 7, 1920, for the Boston Red Sox

MLB statistics
- Games played: 2
- At bats: 2
- Hits: 0
- Stats at Baseball Reference

Teams
- Boston Red Sox (1920)

Lawrence Patrick "Paddy" Smith (May 16, 1894 – December 2, 1990) was an American baseball player. He was a backup catcher in Major League Baseball and played briefly for the Boston Red Sox during the 1920 season. Listed at 6 ft 0 in (1.83 m), 195 lb., Smith batted left-handed and threw right-handed. A native of Pelham, New York, he attended Fordham University.

Smith appeared in two games for the Red Sox and went hitless in two at bats (.000). He did not have any fielding chances in one catching appearance.

Smith died at the age of 96 in New Rochelle, New York.
