= Cliff Brady =

American baseball player (1897–1974)

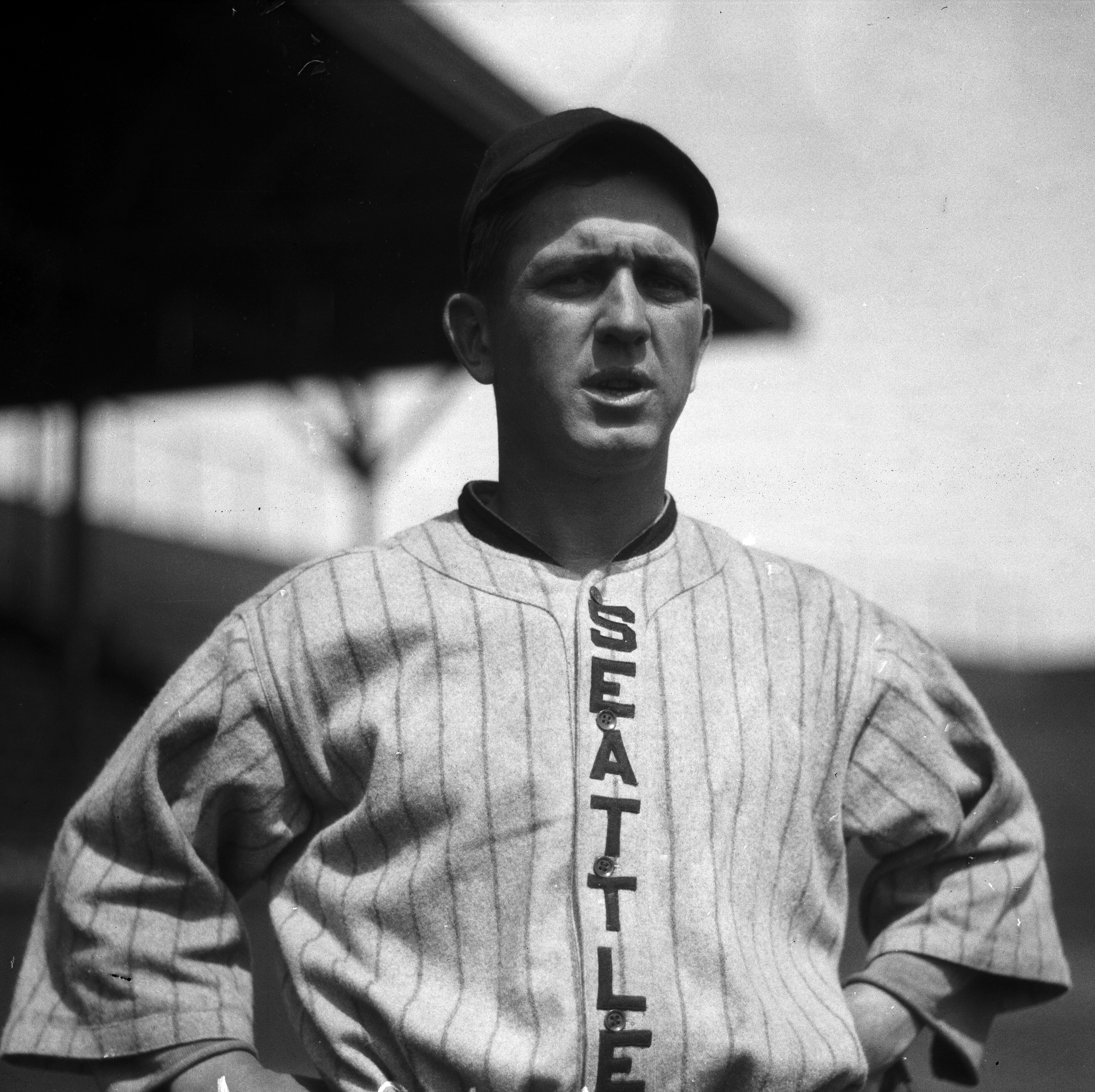
- Brady as a member of the Seattle Indians in 1926
- Second baseman
- Born: March 6, 1897; St. Louis, Missouri
- Died: September 25, 1974 (aged 77); Belleville, Illinois
- Batted: Right Threw: Right

MLB debut
- August 8, 1920, for the Boston Red Sox

Last MLB appearance
- September 28, 1920, for the Boston Red Sox

MLB statistics
- Fielding percentage: .974
- Putouts: 111
- Assists: 193
- Batting average: .228

Teams
- Boston Red Sox (1920)

Clifford Francis Brady (March 6, 1897 – September 25, 1974) was a second baseman in Major League Baseball who played for the Boston Red Sox in the 1920 season. Brady batted and threw right-handed. He was also an outstanding soccer forward in the St. Louis Soccer League. He was born in St. Louis, Missouri.

== Baseball ==
In a 53-game career, Brady posted a .228 batting average (41-for-180) with 16 runs, 12 RBI, five doubles, and one triple without home runs.

Following his major league career, Brady spent 14 seasons in the minors playing and managing.

== Soccer ==
During the winters, Brady played soccer in the St. Louis Soccer League. He was a member of St. Louis Scullin Steel F.C., which won the 1922 National Challenge Cup defeating Todd Shipyard of Brooklyn, 3–2. Allie Schwarz scored two of the Scullin goals and Brady had the other. In the fall of 1922, he suffered an ankle fracture and lost the entire season. He was inducted into the St. Louis Soccer Hall of Fame in 1972.

Brady died in Belleville, Illinois, at the age of 77.
