= Elmer Myers =

American baseball player (1894–1976)

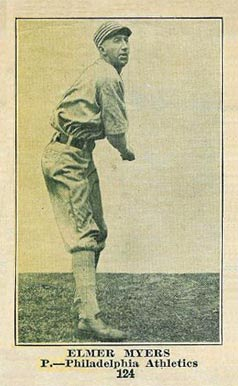
- Pitcher
- Born: March 2, 1894; York Springs, Pennsylvania, U.S.
- Died: July 29, 1976 (aged 82); Collingswood, New Jersey, U.S.
- Batted: Right Threw: Right

MLB debut
- October 6, 1915, for the Philadelphia Athletics

Last MLB appearance
- April 24, 1922, for the Boston Red Sox

MLB statistics
- Win–loss record: 55–72
- Earned run average: 4.06
- Strikeouts: 428
- Stats at Baseball Reference

Teams
- Philadelphia Athletics (1915–1918); Cleveland Indians (1919–1920); Boston Red Sox (1920–1922)

Elmer Glenn Myers (March 2, 1894 – July 29, 1976) was an American professional baseball player who played in the Major Leagues primarily as a pitcher from 1915 to 1922. Myers is notable for being the pitcher that allowed Ty Cobb's 3,000th hit.
