= Guy Morton =

American baseball player (1893–1934)

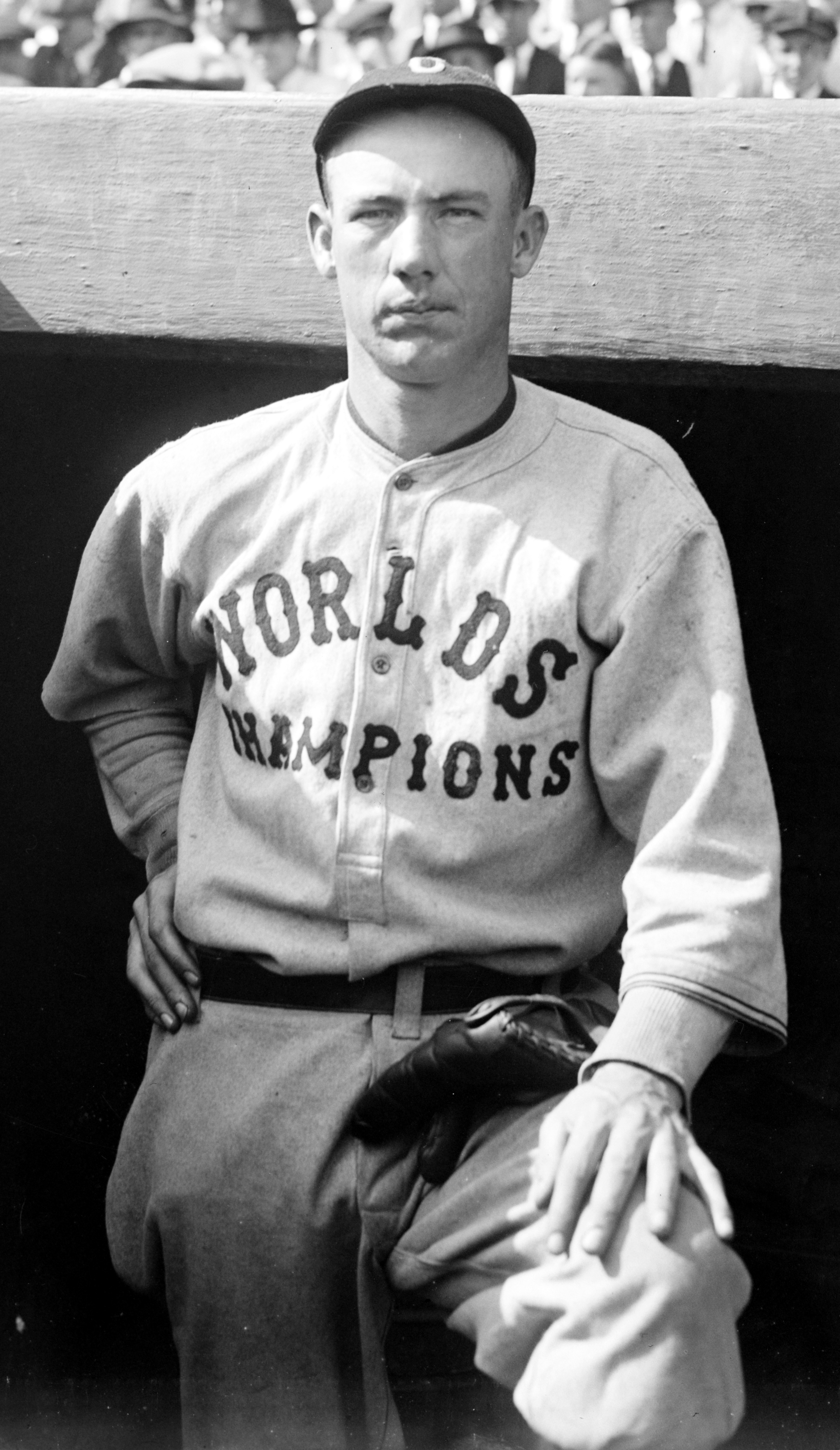
- Pitcher
- Born: June 1, 1893; Vernon, Alabama, U.S.
- Died: October 18, 1934 (aged 41); Sheffield, Alabama, U.S.
- Batted: Right Threw: Right

MLB debut
- June 20, 1914, for the Cleveland Naps

Last MLB appearance
- June 6, 1924, for the Cleveland Indians

MLB statistics
- Win–loss record: 98–88
- Earned run average: 3.13
- Strikeouts: 830
- Stats at Baseball Reference

Teams
- Cleveland Naps / Indians (1914–1924)

Guy Morton, Sr. (June 1, 1893 – October 18, 1934) was an American Major League Baseball pitcher for the Cleveland Indians. Morton was born in Vernon, Alabama.

His best years were from 1915 to 1919, where his ERA was below 3.00 every season, and he won 10 games four times.

Morton died at the age of 41 in Sheffield, AL from a heart attack, and was buried in Vernon City Cemetery in Vernon, AL.

== See also ==
- List of Major League Baseball single-inning strikeout leaders
- List of Major League Baseball players who spent their entire career with one franchise
