= Ping Bodie =

American baseball player (1887–1961)

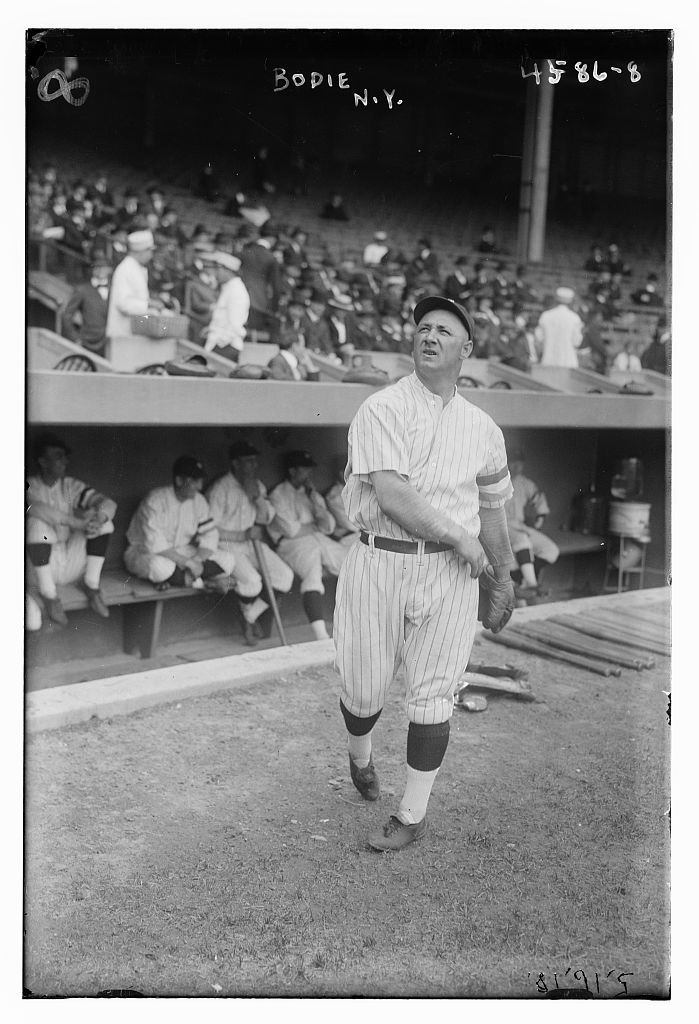
- Bodie in 1918
- Outfielder
- Born: October 8, 1887; San Francisco, California, U.S.
- Died: December 17, 1961 (aged 74); San Francisco, California, U.S.
- Batted: Right Threw: Right

MLB debut
- April 22, 1911, for the Chicago White Sox

Last MLB appearance
- July 24, 1921, for the New York Yankees

MLB statistics
- Batting average: .275
- Home runs: 43
- Runs batted in: 514
- Stats at Baseball Reference

Teams
- Chicago White Sox (1911–1914); Philadelphia Athletics (1917); New York Yankees (1918–1921)

Frank Stephen "Ping" Bodie (October 8, 1887 – December 17, 1961), born Francesco Stephano Pezzolo, was an American center fielder in Major League Baseball who played for the Chicago White Sox (1911–1914), Philadelphia Athletics (1917) and New York Yankees (1919–1921). Bodie batted and threw right-handed. He was born in San Francisco.

Bodie was nicknamed "Ping" for the sound made when his fifty-two-ounce bat crashed into the "dead" ball of his era. Another nickname given to him was "The Wonderful Wop." He took the surname Bodie from the California town he once lived in.

It said that Bodie provided much of the inspiration for Ring Lardner's creation of the famous baseball fictional series You Know Me Al. Appearing originally in the Saturday Evening Post, the piece was written in the form of letters written by a bush league baseball player to a friend back home.

== Career ==
In 1910, playing for the San Francisco Seals of the Pacific Coast League, Bodie hit the then-fantastic total of 30 home runs, and quickly broke into the big leagues with the Chicago White Sox in 1911. In October 1911, Bodie signed to play with the Vallejo Pastimes during the winter offseason [The San Francisco Call, October 30, 1911]. Ping became a regular for four years with Chicago hitting .289 with 97 RBI, .294, .265 and .229. After some clashes with manager Jimmy Callahan in 1914, he was sold back to the San Francisco Seals.

In 1917, Bodie returned to the major leagues with the Philadelphia Athletics. In that season he ranked among the American League top 10 in eight offensive categories: seven home runs (3rd) with 74 RBI (6th), 233 total bases (5th), 46 extra-base hits (5th), 11 triples (8th), 28 doubles (9th), a .418 slugging percentage (6th), and a .774 OPS (10th). He also led AL outfielders with 32 assists.

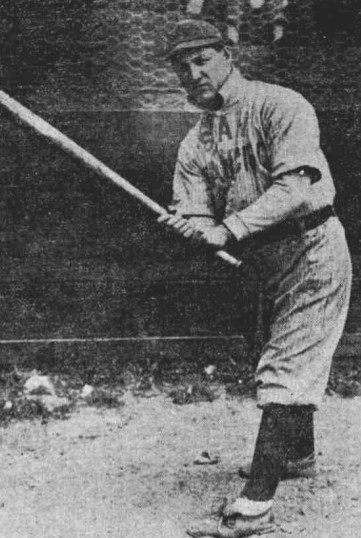
Ping Bodie in 1915

In 1918, the New York Yankees purchased first baseman George Burns from the Detroit Tigers and immediately traded him to the Athletics for Bodie. With the Yankees he batted .256, .278 and .295 in three full seasons. It was during this time that Bodie became Babe Ruth's first Yankee roommate. When asked about rooming with Ruth, Bodie said "Room with him. Why, I room with the big monkey's baggage!"

Noted for a voracious appetite, Bodie competed against a Jacksonville Zoo ostrich named Percy in an eating contest on April 3, 1919, which had been arranged by Yankees co-owner Cap Huston as a publicity stunt. Percy had previously been touted as the "world's greatest eater." The contest was structured similar to a boxing match, with Bodie selecting his favorite dish of spaghetti as the food to be devoured. He was declared the winner after finishing his 11th plate before Percy passed out while starting his.

Bodie was traded to the Boston Red Sox in August 1921. New York went on to win the American League pennant that year. When Bodie asked for a half share of the 1921 World Series money, the Yankees turned him down. After the season was over, he refused to go back to the Red Sox and returned home.

Bodie spent the next seven seasons in the minors playing with the Vernon Tigers and San Francisco Missions in the Pacific Coast League, the Des Moines club in the Western League, and the Wichita Falls and San Antonio Missions in the Texas League.

In a nine-season major league career, Bodie was a .275 hitter with 43 home runs and 514 RBI in 1,050 games.

After his retirement from baseball, Bodie was an electrician for 32 years on Hollywood movie lots and a bit actor, mostly with Universal Studios. He is given credit for inspiring other West Coast Italian American ballplayers who followed him – Tony Lazzeri, Frank Crosetti, and the brothers Joe, Dom and Vince DiMaggio, between others.

Bodie died of cancer in San Francisco, California, at the age of 74. He was buried at Holy Cross Cemetery in Colma. He is a member of the Italian American Sports Hall of Fame.

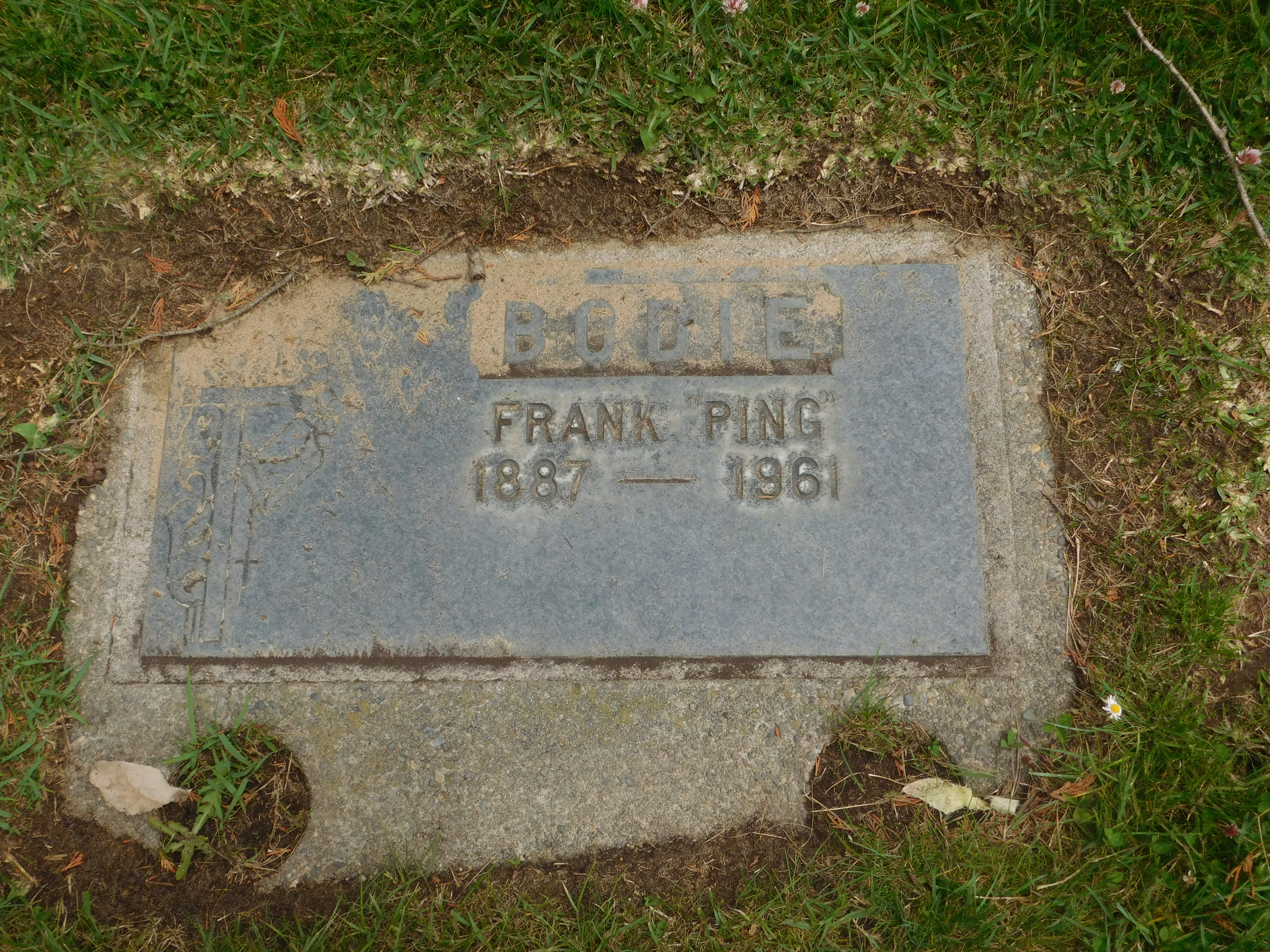
Bodie's grave at Holy Cross Cemetery in Colma, California

== See also ==
- Chicago White Sox all-time roster
