= List of baseball nicknames =

This is a list of nicknames of Major League Baseball teams and players. It includes a complete list of nicknames of players in the Baseball Hall of Fame, a list of nicknames of current players, nicknames of popular players who have played for each major league team, and lists of nicknames grouped into particular categories (e.g., ethnic nicknames, personality trait nicknames etc.). It also includes a list of nicknames of current major league teams. Sports journalists, broadcasters, and fans commonly refer to teams by a wide variety of nicknames. Many of the names are so established that newspapers routinely use the names in headlines.

== Hall of Fame inductees ==
Player	Career	Nickname	Team Inducted As	Ref
Henry Louis Aaron	1954–1976	"Hammer", "Hammerin' Hank" or "Bad Henry"	Milwaukee Braves	
Grover Cleveland Alexander	1911–1930	"Old Pete"	Philadelphia Phillies	
Walter Alston	1954–1976	"Smokey", or "The Quiet Man"	Los Angeles Dodgers	
George Anderson	1970–1995	"Sparky" or "Captain Hook"	Cincinnati Reds	
Adrian Anson	1871–1897	"Cap", "Pop", "Uncle" or "Captain"	Chicago White Stockings	
Luis Aparicio	1956–1973	"Little Louie"	Chicago White Sox	
Luke Appling	1930–1950	"Old Aches & Pains", "Luscious Luke", "Fumblefoot" or "Kid Boots"	Chicago White Sox	
Richie Ashburn	1948–1962	"Putt-Putt", "Whitey", or "The Tilden Flash"	Philadelphia Phillies	
Earl Averill	1929–1941	"Rock" or "Earl of Snohomish"	Cleveland Indians	
Frank Baker	1908–1922	"Home Run"	Philadelphia Athletics	
Dave Bancroft	1915–1930	"Beauty"	Philadelphia Phillies	
Ernie Banks	1953–1971	"Mr. Cub"	Chicago Cubs	
Jake Beckley	1888–1907	"Eagle Eye"	Pittsburgh Pirates	
James Bell	1922–1938, 1942, 1947–1950	"Cool Papa"	St. Louis Stars	
Johnny Bench	1967–1983	"Little General"	Cincinnati Reds	
Charles Bender	1903–1925	"Chief"	Philadelphia Athletics	
Lawrence Peter Berra	1946–1965	"Yogi"	New York Yankees	
Wade Boggs	1982–1999	"Chicken Man"	Boston Red Sox	
Jim Bottomley	1922–1937	"Sunny Jim"	St. Louis Cardinals	
Roger Bresnahan	1897–1915	"The Duke of Tralee"	New York Giants	
Lou Brock	1961–1979	"The Franchise"	St. Louis Cardinals	
Dan Brouthers	1879–1896	"Big Dan" or "Alderman"	Buffalo Bisons	
Mordecai Brown	1903–1916	"Three Finger" or "Miner"	Chicago Cubs	
Willard Brown	1936–1951	"Home Run", "Sonny", or "Ese Hombre"	Kansas City Monarchs	
Jesse Burkett	1890–1905	"Crab"	Cleveland Spiders	
Roy Campanella	1948–1957	"Campy"	Brooklyn Dodgers	
Max Carey	1910–1929	"Scoops"	Pittsburgh Pirates	
Steve Carlton	1965–1988	"Lefty"	Philadelphia Phillies	
Gary Carter	1974–1992	"The Kid"	Montreal Expos	
Orlando Cepeda	1958–1974	"Baby Bull" or "Cha Cha"	San Francisco Giants	
Frank Chance	1898–1914	"Husk", "The Peerless Leader" and part of "Tinker to Evers to Chance"	Chicago Cubs	
Albert Chandler	1945–1951	"Happy"	N/A	
Jack Chesbro	1899–1909	"Happy Jack"	New York Yankees	
Fred Clarke	1897–1915	"Cap"	Pittsburgh Pirates	
Roberto Clemente	1955–1972	"Arriba" or "Bob"	Pittsburgh Pirates	
Ty Cobb	1905–1928	"The Georgia Peach"	Detroit Tigers	
Mickey Cochrane	1925–1937	"Black Mike" or "Mickey"	Detroit Tigers	
Eddie Collins	1906–1930	"Cocky"	Philadelphia Athletics	
Earle Combs	1924–1935	"The Kentucky Colonel"	New York Yankees	
Charlie Comiskey	1882–1894	"Commy" or "The Old Roman"	N/A	
John Conlan	1941–1965	"Jocko"	N/A	
Andy Cooper	1920–1939	"Lefty"	Kansas City Monarchs	
Stan Coveleski	1912–1928	"Covey"	Cleveland Indians	
Sam Crawford	1899–1917	"Wahoo Sam"	Detroit Tigers	
William Cummings	1872–1877	"Candy"	Hartford Dark Blues	
Kiki Cuyler	1921–1938	"Kiki" or "Cuy"	Chicago Cubs	
Jay Dean	1930–1941	"Diz", "Dizzy" or "The Great Man"	St. Louis Cardinals	
Ed Delahanty	1888–1903	"Big Ed"	Philadelphia Phillies	
Martín Dihigo	1923–1945	"El Maestro" or "El Inmortal" (The Immortal)	N/A	
Joe DiMaggio	1936–1951	"The Yankee Clipper" or "Joltin' Joe"	New York Yankees	
Don Drysdale	1956–1969	"Big D"	Los Angeles Dodgers	
Hugh Duffy	1888–1906	"Sir Hugh"	Boston Beaneaters	
Leo Durocher	1925–1973	"The Lip" or "Lippy"	Brooklyn Dodgers	
Dennis Eckersley	1975–1998	"The Eck"	Oakland Athletics	
Johnny Evers	1902–1929	"The Crab", "Trojan," and part of "Tinker to Evers to Chance"	Chicago Cubs	
Buck Ewing	1880–1897	"Buck"	New York Gothams	
Urban Faber	1914–1933	"Red"	Chicago White Sox	
Bob Feller	1936–1956	"Rapid Robert," "Bullet Bob," or "The Heater From Van Meter"	Cleveland Indians	
Rollie Fingers	1968–1985	"Rollie"	Oakland Athletics	
Carlton Fisk	1969–1993	"Pudge"	Boston Red Sox	
Whitey Ford	1950–1967	"Whitey", "The Chairman of the Board", or "Slick"	New York Yankees	
Andrew Foster	1902–1926	"Rube"	Chicago American Giants	
Bud Fowler	N/A	"Bud"	N/A	
Nellie Fox	1947–1965	"Nellie", "Little Nel", or "The Mighty Mite"	Chicago White Sox	
Jimmie Foxx	1925–1945	"Beast" or "Double X"	Boston Red Sox	
Frankie Frisch	1919–1937	"The Fordham Flash"	St. Louis Cardinals	
James Francis Galvin	1875–1892	"Pud", "Gentle Jeems", or "The Little Steam Engine"	Buffalo Bisons	
Lou Gehrig	1923–1939	"The Iron Horse", "Laruppin' Lou", "Buster", or "Biscuit Pants"	New York Yankees	
Charlie Gehringer	1924–1942	"The Mechanical Man" and one of Detroit's "G-Men"	Detroit Tigers	
Bob Gibson	1959–1975	"Hoot" or "Gibby"	St. Louis Cardinals	
Vernon Gomez	1930–1943	"Lefty" or "Goofy"	New York Yankees	
Goose Goslin	1921–1938	"Goose" and one of Detroit's "G-Men"	Washington Senators	
Rich Gossage	1972–1994	"Goose"	New York Yankees	
Hank Greenberg	1930–1947	"Hammerin' Hank", "Hankus Pankus", "The Hebrew Hammer", and one of Detroit's "G-Men"	Detroit Tigers	
Ken Griffey Jr.	1989–2010	"The Kid"	Seattle Mariners	
Clark Griffith	1901–1920	"The Old Fox"	N/A	
Burleigh Grimes	1916–1934	"Ol' Stubblebeard"	Brooklyn Dodgers	
Robert Moses Grove	1925–1941	"Lefty"	Boston Red Sox	
Vladimir Guerrero	1996–2011	"Super Vlad", "Vlad the Impaler" or "Big Daddy Vladdy"	Anaheim Angels	
Tony Gwynn	1982–2001	"Captain Video" or "Mr. Padre"	San Diego Padres	
Charles Hafey	1924–1937	"Chick"	St. Louis Cardinals	
Jesse Haines	1918–1937	"Pop"	St. Louis Cardinals	
Billy Hamilton	1888–1901	"Sliding Billy"	Boston Beaneaters	
Ned Hanlon	1880–1907	"Ned"	Baltimore Orioles (NL)	
Stanley Harris	1919–1956	"Bucky"	Washington Senators	
Charles Hartnett	1922–1941	"Gabby" or "Old Tomato Face"	Chicago Cubs	
Harry Heilmann	1914–1932	"Slug"	Detroit Tigers	
John Preston Hill	1899–1925	"Pete"	N/A	
Harry Hooper	1909–1925	"Hoop"	Boston Red Sox	
Rogers Hornsby	1915–1937	"Rajah"	St. Louis Cardinals	
Waite Hoyt	1918–1938	"Schoolboy"	New York Yankees	
Carl Hubbell	1928–1943	"King Carl" or "The Meal Ticket"	New York Giants	
Catfish Hunter	1965–1979	"Catfish"	N/A	
Monte Irvin	1949–1956	"Mr. Murder Inc."	Newark Eagles	
Reggie Jackson	1967–1987	"Mr. October"	New York Yankees	
Travis Jackson	1922–1936	"Stonewall"	New York Giants	
Ferguson Jenkins	1965–1983	"Fly" or "Fergie"	Chicago Cubs	
Hughie Jennings	1891–1924	"Ee-Yah"	Baltimore Orioles (NL)	
Bancroft Johnson	1900–1927	"Ban"	N/A	
William Julius Johnson	1921–1937	"Judy"	N/A	
Walter Johnson	1907–1927	"The Big Train" or "Barney"	Washington Senators	
Al Kaline	1953–1974	"Salty", "Line", or "Mr. Tiger"	Detroit Tigers	
Tim Keefe	1880–1893	"Smiling Tim" or "Sir Timothy"	New York Giants	
Willie Keeler	1892–1910	"Wee Willie" or "Hit 'Em Where They Ain't"	New York Highlanders	
George Kelly	1915–1932	"Highpockets"	New York Giants	
King Kelly	1878–1893	"Honest Joe" or "King"	Chicago White Stockings	
Harmon Killebrew	1954–1975	"Killer"	Minnesota Twins	
Chuck Klein	1928–1944	"The Hoosier Hammer"	Philadelphia Phillies	
Sandy Koufax	1955–1966	"The Left Arm of God", "Dandy Sandy"	Los Angeles Dodgers	
Napoleon Lajoie	1896–1916	"Larry" or "Poli" or "Nap"	Cleveland Indians	
Tony Lazzeri	1926–1939	"Poosh 'Em Up Tony"	New York Yankees	
Walter Leonard	1933–1950	"Buck"	Homestead Grays	
Freddie Lindstrom	1924–1936	"Lindy"	New York Giants	
John Henry Lloyd	1906–1932	"Pop" or "El Cuchara" (The Shovel)	New York Lincoln Giants	
Ernie Lombardi	1931–1947	"Bocci" or "Schnozz"	Cincinnati Reds	
Ted Lyons	1923–1946	"Sunday Teddy"	Chicago White Sox	
Connie Mack	1894–1950	"Connie", "Mr. Baseball", or "The Tall Tactician"	Philadelphia Athletics	
James Raleigh Mackey	1918–1950	"Biz"	Hilldale Daisies	
Greg Maddux	1986–2008	"Mad Dog" or "The Professor"	N/A	
Mickey Mantle	1951–1968	"The Mick", "The Commerce Comet", or "Muscles"	New York Yankees	
Heinie Manush	1923–1939	"Heinie"	Washington Senators	
Walter Maranville	1912–1935	"Rabbit"	Boston Braves	
Juan Marichal	1960–1975	"Manito", "Mar", or "The Dominican Dandy"	San Francisco Giants	
Rube Marquard	1908–1925	"Rube"	New York Giants	
Christy Mathewson	1900–1916	"Big Six", "Matty", or "The Christian Gentleman"	New York Giants	
Willie Mays	1951–1973	"The Say Hey Kid"	San Francisco Giants	
Bill Mazeroski	1956–1972	"Maz"	Pittsburgh Pirates	
Joe McCarthy	1926–1950	"Marse Joe"	New York Yankees	
Willie McCovey	1959–1980	"Stretch", "Mac", or "Big Mac"	San Francisco Giants	
Joe McGinnity	1899–1908	"Iron Man"	New York Giants	
Bill McGowan	1925–1954	"Little Joe Chest"	N/A	
John McGraw	1899–1932	"Little Napoleon" or "Mugsy"	New York Giants	
Bid McPhee	1882–1899	"Bid"	Cincinnati Red Stockings	
Joe Medwick	1932–1948	"Ducky" or "Ducky Wucky"	St. Louis Cardinals	
José Méndez	1908–1926	"El Diamante Negro" (The Black Diamond)	N/A	
Minnie Miñoso	1946–1980	"Minnie" or "The Cuban Comet"	Chicago White Sox	
Johnny Mize	1936–1953	"The Big Cat"	St. Louis Cardinals	
Paul Molitor	1978–1998	"The Ignitor" or "Molly"	Milwaukee Brewers	
Joe Morgan	1963–1984	"Little Joe"	Cincinnati Reds	
Eddie Murray	1977–1997	"Steady Eddie"	Baltimore Orioles	
Stan Musial	1941–1963	"Stan the Man"	St. Louis Cardinals	
Hal Newhouser	1939–1955	"Prince Hal"	Detroit Tigers	
Kid Nichols	1890–1906	"Kid"	Boston Beaneaters	
Phil Niekro	1964–1987	"Knucksie"	Atlanta Braves	
John Jordan O'Neil	1939–1955	"Buck" or "Nancy"	Kansas City Monarchs (Negro leagues)	
Jim O'Rourke	1872–1904	"Orator Jim"	New York Giants	
David Ortiz	1997-2016	"Big Papi"	Boston Red Sox	
Mel Ott	1926–1947	"Master Melvin"	New York Giants	
Leroy Paige	1948–1953	"Satchel"	Kansas City Monarchs	
Joe Page	1944–1950	"Fireman" or "the Gay Reliever"	New York Yankees	
Jim Palmer	1965–1984	"Cakes"	Baltimore Orioles	
Herb Pennock	1912–1934	"The Knight of Kennett Square"	New York Yankees	
Cumberland Posey	1918–1935	"Cum"	Homestead Grays	
Kirby Puckett	1984–1995	"Puck"	Minnesota Twins	
Charles Radbourn	1881–1891	"Old Hoss"	Providence Grays	
Pee Wee Reese	1940–1958	"Pee Wee" or "The Little Colonel"	Brooklyn Dodgers	
Branch Rickey	1905–1907, 1913–1925	"The Mahatma"	N/A	
Cal Ripken Jr.	1981–2001	"Iron Man"	Baltimore Orioles	
Eppa Rixey	1912–1933	"Jeptha"	Cincinnati Reds	
Phil Rizzuto	1941–1956	"Scooter"	New York Yankees	
Brooks Robinson	1955–1977	"Hoover" or "The Human Vacuum Cleaner"	Baltimore Orioles	
Iván Rodríguez	1991–2011	"Pudge"	Texas Rangers	
Charles Wilber Rogan	1917, 1920–1938	"Bullet" or "Bullet Joe"	Kansas City Monarchs	
Red Ruffing	1924–1947	"Red"	New York Yankees	
Amos Rusie	1889–1901	"The Hoosier Thunderbolt"	New York Giants	
Babe Ruth	1914–1935	"Babe", "The Bambino", "Sultan of Swat" or "Colossus of Clout"	New York Yankees	
Nolan Ryan	1966–1993	"The Ryan Express"	Texas Rangers	
Ryne Sandberg	1981–1997	"Ryno"	Chicago Cubs	
Ray Schalk	1912–1929	"Cracker"	Chicago White Sox	
Mike Schmidt	1972–1989	"Schmidty"	Philadelphia Phillies	
Tom Seaver	1967–1986	"Tom Terrific" or "The Franchise"	New York Mets	
Al Simmons	1924–1944	"Bucketfoot Al"	Philadelphia Athletics	
George Sisler	1915–1930	"Gorgeous George"	St. Louis Browns	
Enos Slaughter	1938–1959	"Country"	St. Louis Cardinals	
Ozzie Smith	1978–1996	"The Wizard of Oz" or "The Wizard"	St. Louis Cardinals	
Duke Snider	1947–1964	"The Silver Fox" or "Duke"	Brooklyn Dodgers	
Tris Speaker	1907–1928	"Tris", "The Grey Eagle" or "Spoke"	Cleveland Indians	
Willie Stargell	1962–1982	"Pops"	Pittsburgh Pirates	
Norman Stearnes	1920–1942, 1945	"Turkey"	Detroit Stars	
Casey Stengel	1912–1925, 1934–1965	"Casey" and "The Ol' Perfessor"	New York Yankees	
George Suttles	1923–1944	"Mule"	Chicago American Giants	
Don Sutton	1966–1988	"Black & Decker"	Los Angeles Dodgers	
Bill Terry	1923–1936	"Memphis Bill"	New York Giants	
Frank Thomas	1990–2008	"The Big Hurt"	Chicago White Sox	
Sam Thompson	1885–1898	"Big Sam"	Philadelphia Phillies	
Harold Traynor	1920–1937	"Pie"	Pittsburgh Pirates	
Charles Vance	1915–1935	"Dazzy"	Brooklyn Dodgers	
Joseph Vaughan	1932–1948	"Arky"	Pittsburgh Pirates	
George Edward Waddell	1897–1910	"Rube"	Philadelphia Athletics	
Honus Wagner	1897–1917	"The Flying Dutchman" or "Honus"	Pittsburgh Pirates	
Lloyd Waner	1927–1945	"Little Poison"	Pittsburgh Pirates	
Paul Waner	1926–1945	"Big Poison"	Pittsburgh Pirates	
John Montgomery Ward	1878–1894	"Monte"	New York Giants	
Earl Weaver	1968–1986	"Doodles"	Baltimore Orioles	
Willie Wells	1923, 1924–1936, 1942, 1944–1948	"El Diablo" (The Devil)	St. Louis Stars	
Zack Wheat	1909–1927	"Buck"	Brooklyn Dodgers	
King Solomon White	1887–1907	"Sol"	N/A	
Billy Williams	1959–1976	"Sweet Swingin' Billy from Whistler"	Chicago Cubs	
Ernest Judson Wilson	1922–1945	"Boojum" or "Jud"	Homestead Grays	
Lewis Robert Wilson	1923–1934	"Hack"	Chicago Cubs	
Joseph Williams	1910–1932	"Smokey Joe" or "Cyclone"	New York Lincoln Giants	
Ted Williams	1939–1960	"The Splendid Splinter", "Teddy Ballgame", "Thumper", or "Kid"	Boston Red Sox	
Dave Winfield	1973–1995	"Winny" or the derogatory "Mr. May"	San Diego Padres	
Early Wynn	1939–1963	"Gus"	Cleveland Indians	
Carl Yastrzemski	1961–1983	"Yaz"	Boston Red Sox	
Denton True Young	1890–1911	"Cy" or "Cyclone"	Cleveland Spiders	
Ross Youngs	1917–1926	"Pep"	New York Giants	

== Common nicknames ==
An analysis undertaken in 1981 by James Skipper for the Society for American Baseball Research revealed the following as the most common nicknames in the history of baseball to that date.

Rank	Nickname	Frequency	Examples (Hall of Fame inductees in bold)
1	Lefty	152	**Lefty Gomez** (1930–43, BHOF), **Lefty Grove** (1925–41, BHOF), **Steve Carlton** (1965–1988, BHOF), Lefty Johnson (1884–92), Lefty Marr (1886–91), Lefty Herring (1899–1904), Lefty Davis (1901–07), Lefty Leifield (1905–20), Lefty Russell (1910–12), Lefty Tyler (1910–21), Lefty George (1911–18), Lefty James (1912–14), Lefty Williams (1913–20), Lefty O'Doul (1919–34), Lefty Weinert (1919–31), Lefty Stewart (1921–35), Lefty Robinson (1924–32), Lefty Thomas (1925–26), Lefty Willis 1925–27), Lefty Bowers (1926–27), Lefty Taber (1926–27), Lefty Holmes (1929–30), Lefty Capers (1930–31), Lefty Calhoun (1932–46), Thornton Lee (1933–48), Lefty Moses (1938–40), Lefty Bowe (1939–40), Lefty Phillips (1939–40), Lefty Boone (1940–44), Lefty Hoerst (1940–47), Lefty Wallace (1942–46), Bill Wight (1946–58)
2	Red	120	**Red Faber** (1914–33, BHOF), **Red Ruffing** (1924–47, BHOF), **Red Schoendienst** (1945–63, BHOF),Red Woodhead (1873–79), Red Ehret (1888–98), Red Owens (1899–1905), Red Dooin (1902–16), Red Ames (1903–19), Red Kleinow (1904–11), Red Murray (1906–17), Red Downs (1907–12), Red Killefer (1907–16), Red Corriden (1910–15), Red Nelson (1910–13), Red Hoff (1911–15), Red Smith (1911–19), Red McKee (1913–16), Red Oldham (1914–26), Red Shannon (1915–26), Red Smyth (1915–18), Red Smith (1917–18), Red Causey (1918–22), Red Shea (1918–22), Red Sheridan (1918–20), Red Lucas (1923–38), Red Ryan (1923–32), Red Charleston (1924–32), Red Rollings (1927–30), Red Peery (1927–30), Red Barnes (1927–30), Red Kress (1927–46), Red Badgro (1929–30), Red McNeal (1930–32), Red Rolfe (1931–42), Red Worthington (1931–34), Red Longley (1932–47), Red Nonnenkamp (1933–40), Red Phillips (1934–36), Red Marion (1935–43), Red Evans (1936–39), Red Moore (1936–40), Red Anderson (1937–41), Red Barkley (1937–43), Red Barrett (1937–49), Red Hale (1937–39), Red Howard (1937–46), Red Hadley (1938–39), Red Lynn (1939–44), Red Embree (1941–49), Red Munger (1943–56), Red Borom (1944–45), Red Hayworth (1944–45), Red Durrett (1944–45), Red Treadway (1944–45), Red Wilson (1951–60), Red Swanson (1955–57), Red Murff (1956–57), Red Witt (1957–62), Red Patterson (2014),
3	Doc	61	Doc Bushong (1875–90), Doc Kennedy (1879–83), Doc Amole (1897–98), Doc Powers (1898–1909), Doc Newton (1900–09), Doc White (1901–13), Doc Smoot (1902–06), Doc Gessler (1903–11), Doc Scanlan (1903–11), Doc Marshall (1904–09), Doc Reisling (1904–10), Doc Crandall (1908–18), Doc Martin (1908–12) Doc Johnston (1909–22), Doc Martell (1909–10), Doc Miller (1910–14), Doc Ayers (1913–21), Doc Cook (1913–16), Doc Lavan (1913–24), Doc Watson (1913–15), Doc Kerr (1914–15), Doc Dudley (192–23), Doc Prothro (1920–26), Doc Sykes (1923–24), Doc Farrell (1925–35), Doc Gautreau (1925–28), Doc Cramer (1929–48), Doc Marshall (1929–32), Doc Dennis (1943–48), Doc Bracken (1946–47), Doc Edwards (1962–70), Dock Ellis (1968–79), Doc Medich (1972–82), Dwight Gooden (1984–2000), Roy Halladay (1998–2013), Dave Roberts (1999–2008)
4	Bud/Buddy	51	Bud Sharpe (1905–19), Buddy Napier (1912–21), Bud Weiser (1915–16), Bud Clancy (1924–34), Buddy Myer (1925–41), Bud Mitchell (1929–35), Buddy Burbage (1929–43), Bud Teachout (1930–32), Bud Thomas (pitcher) (1932–41), Bud Tinning (1932–35), Buddy Armour (1933–47), Bud Hafey (1935–37), Buddy Lewis (1935–49), Bud Barbee (1937–48), Buddy Rosar (1939–51), Buddy Hassett (1936–42), Bud Jones (1940–41), Buddy Gremp (1940–42), Bud Stewart (1941–54), Buddy Blattner (1942–49), Bud Byerly (1943–60), Bud Metheny (1943–46), Buddy Kerr (1943–51), Bud Souchock (1946–55), Buddy Lively (1947–49), Bud Podbielan (1949–59), Bud Sheely (1951–53), Bud Thomas (shortstop) (1951), Bud Black (1952–56), Bud Daley (1955–64), Buddy Peterson (1955–57), Bud Zipfel (1961–62), Bud Bloomfield (1963–64), Bud Harrelson (1965–80), Buddy Booker (1966–68), Buddy Bradford (1966–76), Buddy Harris (1970–71), Buddy Hunter (1971–75), Buddy Bell (1972–89), Buddy Schultz (1975–79), Bud Black (1981–85), Bud Anderson (1982–83), Buddy Biancalana (1982–87), Buddy Groom (1992–2005), Buddy Carlyle (1999–2015), Bud Smith (2001–02), Bud Norris (2009–18), Buddy Boshers (2013–19), Buddy Baumann (2016–18), Buddy Kennedy (2022–24)
5	Dutch	47	Dutch Jordan (1903–04), Dutch Zwilling (1910–16), Dutch Leonard (1913–25), Dutch Ruether (1917–27), Dutch Wetzel (1920–21), Dutch Henry (1921–30), Dutch Ussat (1925–27), Dutch Holland (1932–34), Dutch Leonard (1933–53), Dutch Lieber (1935–36), Dutch Meyer (1937–46), Dutch Dotterer (1957–61)
6	Big	45	**Dan Brouthers** ("Big Dan") (1879–1904, BHOF), **Sam Thompson** ("Big Sam") (1885–1906, BHOF), **Ed Delahanty** ("Big Ed") (1888–1903), **Ed Walsh** ("Big Ed") (1904–17, BHOF), Jim Clinton ("Big Jim") (1872–86), Big Bill Smith (1889–1914), Mike Mahoney ("Big Mike") (1897–98), Bill Dinneen ("Big Bill") (1898–1909), Big Jeff Pfeffer (1905–11), Ed Reulbach ("Big Ed") (1905–17), Bill Abstein ("Big Bill") (1906–10), Bill Gatewood ("Big Bill") (1906–29), Ed Konetchy ("Big Ed") (1907–21), Bill James ("Big Bill") (1911–19), Tom Phillips ("Big Tom") (1915–22), Bill Bagwell ("Big Bill") (1923–25), Jim Roberts ("Big Jim") (1924–25), Jim Weaver ("Big James") (1928–39), Bill Lee ("Big Bill") (1934–47), Bill Voiselle ("Big Bill") (1942–50), Ed Sevens ("Big Ed") (1945–50), George Crowe ("Big George") (1947–61), Jim Fridley ("Big Jim") (1952–58), Bob Lee ("Big Bob") (1964–68)
7	Mickey	27	**Mickey Cochrane** (1925–37, BHOF), Mickey Devine (1918–25), Mickey Heath (1931–32), Mickey Casey (1932–42), Mickey Owen (1937–54), Mickey Livingston (1938–51), Mickey Vernon (1939–60), Mickey Harris (1940–52), Mickey Witek (1940–49), Mickey Haefner (1943–50), Mickey Kreitner (1943–44), Mickey Micelotta (1954–55), Mickey Stanley (1964–78), Mickey Rivers (1970–84), Mickey Scott (1972–77), Mickey Klutts (1976–83), Mickey Moniak (2020–24)
8	Whitey	27	**Whitey Ford** (1950–67, BHOF), Whitey Ritterson (1876), Whitey Alpermann (1906–09), Whitey Witt (1916–26), Whitey Glazner (1920–24), Whitey Wistert (1934), Whitey Moore (1936–42), Whitey Wietelmann (1939–47), Whitey Kurowski (1941–49), Whitey Platt (1942–49), Whitey Lockman (1945–60), Whitey Herzog (1956–63)
9	Chick	26	**Chick Hafey** (1924–37, BHOF), Chick Fraser (1896–1909), Chick Stahl (1897–1906), Chick Robitaille (1904–05), Chick Autry (first baseman) (1907–09), Chick Brandom (1908–15), Chick Evans (1909–10), Chick Gandil (1910–19), Chick Lathers (1910–11), Chick Davies (1914–26), Chick Shorten (1915–24), Chick Fewster (1917–27), Chick Galloway (1919–28), Chick Harper (1920–25), Chick Gagnon (1922–24), Chick Autry (catcher) (1924–30), Chick Fullis (1928–36), Chick King (1954–59)
10	Kid	25	**Kid Nichols** (1890–1906, BHOF), Kid Baldwin (1884–90), Kid Madden (1887–91), Kid Gleason (1888–1912), Kid Carsey (1891–1901), Kid Camp (1892–94), Kid Elberfeld (1898–1914), Kid Lowe (1921–30)
11	Tex	24	Tex Erwin (1907–14), Tex Pruiett (1907–08) Tex Covington (1911–12), Tex McDonald (1912–15), Tex Wisterzil (1914–15), Tex Jeanes (1921–27), Tex Burnett (1922–41), Tex Carleton (1932–40), Tex Hughson (1941–49), Tex Shirley (1941–46), Tex Clevenger (1954–62), Tex Nelson (1955–57)
12	Pop	22	**Jesse Haines** (1918–37, BHOF), Pop Snyder (1873–91), Pop Smith (1880–91), Pop Corkhill (1883–92), Pop Schriver (1886–1901), Pop Williams (1898–1903), Frank Dillon (1899–1904), Ray Prim (1933–46), Shawon Dunston (1985–2002)
13	Babe	22	**Babe Ruth** (1914–35, BHOF), Babe Doty (1890), Babe Borton (1912–16), Babe Adams (1906–26), Babe Ellison (1916–20), Babe Pinelli (1918–27), Babe Twombly (1920–21), Babe Herman (1926–45), Babe Melton (1926–29), Babe Ganzel (1927–28), Babe Phelps (1931–42), Babe Dahlgren (1935–46), Babe Young (1936–48), Babe Barna (1937–43), Babe Davis (1938–40), Babe Martin (1944–53), Babe Birrer (1955–58)
14	Chief	21	**Chief Bender** (1903–25, BHOF), Chief Roseman (1882–90), Chief Zimmer (1884–1903), Chief Wilson (1908–16), Chief Meyers (1909–17), Chief Chouneau (1910), Chief Johnson (1913–15), Chief Youngblood (1922), Mel Harder (1928–47), Chief Hogsett (1929–44)
15	Heinie	21	**Heinie Manush** (1923–49, BHOF), Heinie Kappel (1887–1889), Heinie Peitz (1893–1913), Heinie Reitz (1893–99), Heinie Smith (1897–1903), Heinie Wagner (1902–18), Heinie Berger (1907–10), Heinie Zimmerman (1907–19), Heinie Beckendorf (1909–10), Heinie Heitmuller (1909–10), Heinie Groh (1912–27), Heinie Elder (1913), Heinie Stafford (1916), Heinie Mueller (outfielder) (1920–35), Heinie Meine (1922–34), Heinie Scheer (1922–23), Heinie Sand (1923–28), Heinie Odom (1925), Heinie Schuble (1927–36), Heinie Mueller (second baseman) (1938–1941), Heinie Heltzel (1943–44)
16	Pete	20	**Grover Cleveland Alexander** ("Old Pete", 1911–1930), Pete Browning (1882–94), Pete Dowling (1897–1901), Pete Lamer (1902–07), Pete Compton (1911–18), Pete Henning (1914–15), Pete Scott (1926–28), Pete Center (1942–46), Pete Milne (1948–50), Pete Fox (1933–45), Pete Varney (1973–76)
17	Fritz	19	Fritz Clausen (1892–96), Fritz Buelow (1899–1907), Fritz Maisel (1913–18), Fritz Mollwitz (1913–19), Fritz Coumbe (1914–21), Fritz Scheeren (1914–15), Fritz Von Kolnitz (1914–16), Fred Bratschi (1921–27), Fritz Schulte (1927–37), Fritz Knothe (1932–33), Fritz Ostermueller (1934–48), Fritz Dorish (1947–56), Fritz Brickell (1958–61), Fritz Ackley (1963–64), Fritz Peterson (1966–76), Fritzie Connally (1983–85)
18	Cy	16	**Cy Young** (1890–1911, BHOF), Cyclone Miller (1884–1886), Cyclone Ryan (1887–91), Cy Seymour (1896–1913), Cy Swain (1897–98), Cy Falkenberg (1903–17), Cy Morgan (1903–13), Cy Ferry (1904–05), Cy Barger (1906–15), Cy Slapnicka (1911–18), Cy Williams (1912–30), Cy Pieh (1913–15), Cy Rheam (1914–15), Cy Perkins (1915–34), Cy Warmoth (1916–23), Cy Morgan (1921–22), Cy Moore (1929–34), Cy Blanton (1934–42), Cy Block (1942–46), Cy Acosta (1972–75)
19	Moose	16	Moose McCormick (1904–13), George Earnshaw (1928–36), Moose Solters (1934–43), Walt Dropo (1949–61) Walt Moryn (1954–61), Bill Skowron (1954–67), Moose Haas (1976–87), Mike Mussina (1991–2008), Mike Moustakas (2011–23), Joe Musgrove (2016–24)
20	Deacon	15	**Deacon White** (1871–90, BHOF), Deacon McGuire (1884–1912), Deacon Phillippe (1899–1911), Deacon Meyers (1921–26), Deacon Donahue (1943–44), Deacon Jones (1962–66)
21	Rabbit	14	**Rabbit Maranville** (1912–35, BHOF), Jimmy Slagle (1899–1908), Rabbit Robinson (1903–10), Miller Huggins (1904–16), Otis Lawry (1916–17), Rabbit Whitman, Jackie Tavener (1921–29), Rabbit Warstler (1930–40)
22	Rip	14	Rip Hagerman (1909–16), Rip Jordan (1912–19), Rip Collins (1920–31), Rip Wheeler (1921–24), Rip Sewell (1932–49), Rip Radcliff (1934–43), Rip Russell (1939–47), Rip Repulski (1953–61), Rip Coleman (1955–60)
23	Blackie	13	Frank O'Rourke (1912–31), Leo Mangum (1924–35), Blackie Carter (1925–26), Bill Clarkson (1927–29), Gus Mancuso (1928–45), Joe Kohlman (1937–38), Alvin Dark (1946–60), Sam Dente (1947–55), Jim Derrington (1956–57)
24	Buster	13	Buster Brown (1905–13), Buster Ross (1924–26), Buster Chatham (1930–31), Buster Mills (1934–46), Buster Clarkson (1938–52), Buster Adams (1939–47), Buster Haywood (1940–48), Buster Maynard (1940–46), Buster Narum (1963–67), Buster Posey (2009–21)
25	Dixie	13	Dixie Walker (1909–12), Dixie Davis (1912–26), Dixie Walker (1931–49), Dixie Parsons (1939–43), Dixie Howell (1940–58), Dixie Howell (1947–56)
26	Butch	12	Roy Sanders (1917–18), Butch Henline (1921–31), Butch Weis (1922–25), Ken Keltner (1937–50), Don Kolloway (1940–53), Butch Nieman (1943–45), Butch Davis (1944–49), Bob Heffner (1963–68), Butch Metzger (1974–78), Butch Hobson (1975–82), Butch Wynegar (1976–88), Butch Benton (1978–85), Butch Davis (1983–94), Butch Henry (1992–99), Butch Huskey (1993–2000)
27	Sheriff	12	Del Gainer (1909–22), Sheriff Blake (1920–37); Jim Constable (1956–1958); Norm Charlton (1988–2001); Chris Paddack (2019–2026)
28	Happy	11	Jack Chesbro ("Happy Jack", 1899–1909), Happy Iott (1903), Happy Townsend (1901–06), Happy Smith (1910), Happy Finneran (1912–18), Happy Felsch (1915–20), Happy Foreman (1924–26)
29	King	11	**King Kelly** (1878–93, BHOF), King Bailey (1895), King Brady (1905–12), King Brockett (1907–11), King Cole (1909–15), King Lear (1914–15), Charlie Schmutz (1914–15)
30	Pat	11	Pat Crawford (1929–1934)
31	Jumbo	10	Jumbo Latham (1975–84), Jumbo McGinnis (1882–87), Jumbo Davis (1884–91), Jumbo Schoeneck (1884–89), Jumbo Harting (1886), Jumbo Elliott (1923–34), Jumbo Brown (1925–41), Jumbo Díaz (2014–17)
32	Pinky	10	Pinky Swander (1903–04), Pinky Hargrave (1923–33), Chris Lindsay (1905–06), Pinky Pittenger (1921–29), Pinky Ward (1924–32), Pinky Whitney (1928–39), Pinky Higgins (1930–46), Pinky Jorgensen (1937), Pinky May (1939–43), Pauline Pirok (AAGPBL 1943–48), Pinky Woods (1943–45), Noella Leduc (AAGPBL 1951–54)

Other common baseball nicknames not included in the list compiled by James Skipper are:

Nickname	Examples
Buck/Bucky/Bucko	**Buck Ewing** (1880–97, BHOF), **Zack Wheat** ("Buck") (1909–27, BHOF), **Bucky Harris** (1924–56, BHOF), **Buck Leonard** (1933–50, BHOF), **Buck O'Neil** (1937–55, BHOF), Buck Gladmon (1883–86), Buck Becannon (1884–87), Buck West (1884, 1890), Buck Freeman (1891–1907), Buck Hooker (1902–03), Bucky Veil (1903–04), Buck Washer (1905), Buck Hopkins (1907), Buck Herzog (1908–20), Buck O'Brien (1911–13), Buck Stanley (1911), Buck Weaver (1912–20), Buck Sweeney (1914), Buck Danner (1915), Buck Thrasher (1916–17), Buck Ewing (1920s catcher) (1920–30), Buck Freeman (1921–22), Buck Alexander (1923–26), Buck Crouse (1923–30), Buck Jordan (1927–38), Bucky Williams (1927–36), Buck Redfern (1928–29), Buck Stanton (1931), Bucky Walters (1931–50), Buck Marrow (1932–38), Frank McCormick ("Buck") (1934–48), Buck Rogers (1935), Buck Ross (1936–45), Bucky Jacobs (1937–40), Bucky Johnson (1939), Buck Frierson (1941), Buck Etchison (1943–44), Buck Fausett (1944), Buck Felder (1944–45), Buck Thomas (1944), Buck Varner (1952), Buck Rodgers (1961–69), Grant Jackson ("Buck") (1965–82), Buck Martinez (1969–86), Bucky Dent (1973–84), Buck Coats (2006–08), Buck Farmer (2014–24), Byron Buxton ("Buck") (2015–24), Oliver Drake ("Bucko") (2015–20)
Bugs/Bugsy	Bugs Raymond (1904–11), Bugs Reisigl (1911), Charlie Grover ("Bugs") (1913), Fred Kommers ("Bugs") (1913–14), Harry Eccles ("Bugs") (1915), Bugs Bennett (1918–21), Bill Werle ("Bugs") (1949–54), Brett Butler ("Bugsy") (1981–97)
Bunny	John Godwin (1905–06), Bunny Pearce (1908–09), Bunny Madden (1909–11), Bunny Hearn (1910–20), Bunny Brief (1912–17), Hugh High (1913–18), Bunny Corcoran (1915), Bunny Fabrique (1916–17), Bunny Roser (1922), Bunny Downs (1923–29), Bunny Hearn (1920s pitcher) (1926–29)
Candy	**Candy Cummings** (1866–77, BHOF), Candy Nelson (1867–90), Candy Nelson (1872–90), Candy LaChance (1893–1905), Candy Jim Taylor (1904–48), Candy Harris (1967), John Candelaria ("Candy Man") (1975–93), Candy Maldonado (1981–95), Candy Sierra (1988)
Ducky	**Joe Medwick** (1932–48, BHOF), Ducky Hemp (1887–90), Ducky Holmes (1895–1905), Ducky Holmes (1906), George Hale (1914–18), Ducky Yount (1914), Johnny Tillman (1915), Bob Jones (1917–25), Ducky Detweiler (1942–46)
Dusty	Dusty Miller (1889–99), Dusty Miller (1902), Bob Rhoads (1902–09), Charlie Rhodes (1906–09), Gordon Rhodes (1929–56), Dusty Cooke (1930–38), Dusty Decker (1932–37), Dusty Rhodes (pitcher) (1932), Mel Parnell (1947–56), Dusty Rhodes (outfielder) (1952–59), Dusty Baker (1968–86), Dusty Allen (2000), Dusty Wathan (2002), Dusty Bergman (2004), Dusty Ryan (2008–09),Dusty Brown (2009–11), Dusty Hughes (2009–11), Dusty Coleman (2015–17)
Hack	**Hack Wilson** (1923–34, BHOF), Hack Schumann (1906), Hack Simmons (1910–15), Hack Spencer (1912), Hack Eibel (1912–20), Hack Miller (1916–25), Hack Miller (1944–45)
Hap/Happy	**Jack Chesbro** ("Happy Jack") (1899–1909), Henry Buker ("Happy") (1884), Jack Bellman ("Happy Jack") (1889), Jack Stivetts ("Happy Jack") (1889–99), Pat Hartnett (Happy") (1890), Happy Townsend (1901–06), Happy Iott (1903), Jack Cameron ("Happy Jack") (1906), Hap Myers (1910–15), Happy Smith (1910), Hap Morse (1911), Jack Kibble ("Happy") (1912), Hap Ward (1912), Happy Felsch (1915–20), Emil Huhn ("Hap") (1915–17), Bill Hollahan ("Happy") (1920), Happy Foreman (1924–26), Hap Collard (1927–30), Al Milnar ("Happy") (1936–46), Hap Glenn (1938), Burt Hooton ("Happy") (1971–85)
Hub	Hub Collins (1886–92), Hub Hart (1905–07), Hub Knolls (1906), Hub Northern (1910–12), Hub Pernoll (1910–12), Hub Perdue (1911–15), Hub Pruett (1922–32), Hub Walker (1931–45), Hub Andrews (1947–48)
Nig	Nig Cuppy (1892–1901), Nig Fuller (1902), Frank Smith (1904–15), Nig Clarke (1905–1920), Nig Perrine (1907), Joe Berry (1921–22), Charlie Niebergall (1921–24), Johnny Grabowski (1924–31), Nig Lipscomb (1937), Bobby Bragan (1940–48), Johnny Beazley (1941–49)
Pepper	Josh Clarke (1898–1911), Roy Clark (1902), Andy Oyler (1902), Jimmy Austin (1909–29), Marty Berghammer (1911–15), Hank Griffin (1911–12), Pepper Peploski (1913), Pepper Daniels (1921–35), Pepper Martin (1928–44), John Stone (1928–38), Pepper Bassett (1934–50), Eddie Morgan (1936–37), Pepper Morgan (1937–38), Pepper Sharpe (1943–48), Pepper Paire (AAGPBL 1944–52)
Rocky	Rocky Ellis (1934–40), Ford Garrison ("Rocky") (1943–46), Rocky Stone (1943), Bobby Rhawn ("Rocky") (1947–49), Rocky Krsnich (1949–53), Rocky Nelson (1949–61), Rocky Bridges (1951–61), George Schmees (1952), Rocky Colavito (1955–68), Bob Johnson ("Rocky") (1960–70), Ron Swoboda ("Rocky") (1965–73), Rocky Childress (1985–88), Rocky Coppinger (1996–2001), Rocky Biddle (2000–04), Rocky Cherry (2007–08), Rocky Gale (2015–19)
Rube	**Rube Waddell** (1897–1910, BHOF), **Rube Marquard** (1908–25, BHOF), Rube Kisinger (1902–03), Rube Vickers (1902–09), Rube Ward (1902), Rube Vinson (1904–06), Rube DeGroff (1905–06), Ed Kinsella (1905–10), Rube Oldring (1905–18), Rube Kroh (1906–12), Rube Dessau (1907–10), Rube Manning (1907–10), Rube Ellis (1909–12), Rube Benton (1910–25), Rube Geyer (1910–13), Rube Sellers (1910), Rube Marshall (1912–15), Rube Peters (1912–14), Rube Foster (1913–17), Rube Schauer (1913–17), Dan Adams (1914–15), Rube Bressler (1914–32), Rube Parnham (1916–17), Rube Curry (1920–28), Rube Henderson (1921–22), Rube Yarrison (1922–24), Rube Lutzke (1923–27), Rube Walberg (1923–37), Rube Ehrhardt (1924–29), Rube Chambers (1925–27), Rube Wiggins (1938), Ed Albosta (1941, 1946), Rube Fischer (1941–46), Rube Melton (1941–47), Rube Walker (1948–58), Rube Novotney (1949)
Rusty	Rusty Yarnall (1926), Rusty Saunders (1927), Rusty Peters (1936–47), Rusty Payne (1940), Rusty Staub (1963–85), Rusty Torres (1971–80), Rusty Gerhardt (1974), Rusty Kuntz (1979–83), Rusty Tillman (1982–88), Rusty McNealy (1983), Rusty Richards (1989–90), Rusty Meacham (1991–2001), Rusty Greer (1994–2002), Rusty Ryal (2009–10)
Sad Sam	Sam Gray (1924–33), Sad Sam Jones (1914–35),, Sam Zoldak (1944–52)
Skip/Skippy	Skip Dowd (1910), Skipper Roberts (1913–14), Skippy Roberge (1941–46), Skip Avery (1948), Skip Lockwood (1965–80), Skip Guinn (1968–71), Skip Pitlock (1970–75), Skip Jutze (1972–77), Skip James (1977–78), Skip Schumaker (2005–15)
Smoky	**Smokey Joe Williams** (1907–32, BHOF), **Walter Alston** (1936, BHOF), Smoky Joe Wood (1908–22), Smoky Owens (1939–42), Smoky Burgess (1949–67), Charlie Maxwell (1950–64)
Skeeter	Skeeter Shelton (1915), Carson Bigbee (1916–26), Skeeter Webb (1932–48), Skeeter Newsome (1935–47), Skeeter Scalzi (1939), Skeeter Kell (1952), Lee Tate (1958–59), Clyde Wright (1966–78), Skeeter Barnes (1983–94)
Duke	**Duke Snider**, **Roger Bresnahan** ("Duke of Tralee"), Duke Sims, Duke Maas, Duke Farrell, Duke Carmel, Duke Welker, Duke Esper, Duke Kenworthy, Duke Markell, Duke Kelleher, Duke Reilley, Duke Sedgwick, Duke Shirey, Duke Cleveland, Duke Lattimore, Duke Markham
Cap/Captain	**Cap Anson**, **Sparky Anderson** ("Captain Hook"), **Derek Jeter** ("The Captain"), Cap Peterson, Cap Crowell, Cap Clark, Cap Tyson
Buzz/Buzzy	Buzz Capra, Buzz Arlett, Buzz Boyle, Buzz Stephen, Buzz Dozier, Buzz Murphy, Buzz Wetzel, Steve Busby ("Buzz")
Slim	Slim Sallee, Slim Harriss, Slim Love, Slim McGrew, Slim Harrell, Slim Embry, Slim Berry, Slim Branham, Slim Jones, Slim Vaughan

== Player nicknames ==
=== Major League teams ===
==== Arizona Diamondbacks players nicknames ====
- Luis Gonzalez, 1999–2006: "Gonzo"
- Randy Johnson, 1999–2004: "the Big Unit"

==== Atlanta Braves players nicknames ====
- Hank Aaron, 1954–1974: "Hammerin' Hank"
- Ronald Acuña Jr., 2018–present: "La Bestia"
- Ozzie Albies, 2017–present: "Bolly"
- Felipe Alou, 1958–1974: "Panque"
- Dusty Baker, 1968–1986: "Dusty"
- Steve Bedrosian, 1981–1995: "Bedrock"
- Bruce Benedict, 1978–1989: "Retriever", "Eggs"
- Buzz Capra, 1971–1977: "Buzz"
- Rico Carty, 1963–1979: "Big Boy (Beeg Boy)" or "Rico"
- Chris Chambliss, 1971–1988: "Silent One"
- Darrell Evans, 1969–1989: "Doody", "Howdy", or "Howdy Doody"
- Rafael Furcal, 2000–2014: "El Enano (The Dwarf)"
- Ralph Garr, 1968–1980: "Roadrunner"
- Evan Gattis, 2013–2018: "El Oso Blanco (The White Bear)"
- Tom Glavine 1987–2008 "The Great Glavine" or "Tommy G"
- Eric Hinske: Hinske With His Best Shot
- Bob Horner 1978–1988 "Mr. Ho Mah"
- Andruw Jones, 1996–2012: "The Curaçao Kid"
- Chipper Jones 1993–2012 "Chipper"
- Ryan Klesko: "Rhino"
- Mark Lemke 1988–1998 "Dirt" or "The Lemmer"
- Greg Maddux 1986–2008 "Mad Dog" or "The Professor"
- Rabbit Maranville, 1912–1920: "Rabbit" ,
- Eddie Mathews, 1952–1968: "Eddie Mattress"
- Fred McGriff 1993–1997 "Crime Dog"
- Dale Murphy, 1976–1993: "Murph" or "All-American Boy"
- Phil Niekro, 1964–1987: "Knucksie"
- Rafael Ramírez, 1980–1992: "Raffy"
- John Smoltz, 1988–2009: "Smoltzie", "Marmaduke"
- Warren Spahn, 1942–1965: "The Invincible One"
- Joe Torre, 1960–1977: "El Chino"
- Bob Uecker, 1962–1963: "Uke" or "Mr. Baseball"

==== Baltimore Orioles players nicknames ====
- Don Baylor, 1970–1975: "Groove"
- Mark Belanger, 1965–1982: "The Blade"
- Paul Blair, 1964–1976: "Motormouth" ,
- Al Bumbry, 1972–1984: "The Bee"
- Butch Davis, 1988–1989: "Butch" ,
- Chris Davis, 2008–2020: "Crush"
- Jim Gentile, 1960–1963: "Diamond Jim" ,
- J. J. Hardy, 2011–2017: "JJ"
- Milt Pappas, 1957–1965: "Gimpy"
- Barney Pelty, 1903–1912: "The Yiddish Curver"
- Boog Powell, 1961–1974: "Boog"
- Cal Ripken, 1981–2001: "Iron Man"
- Brooks Robinson, 1955–1977: "Human Vacuum Cleaner"
- Frank Robinson, 1966–1971: "The Judge" ,
- Buck Showalter, 2010–2018 (manager): "Buck"
- Hoyt Wilhelm, 1958–1962: "Old Sarge"

==== Boston Red Sox players nicknames ====
- Bronson Arroyo (2000–2017): "Saturn Nuts", "Smokey", "Tacks", "Dirty", "BroYo" or "Free Love"
- Andrew Benintendi (2016–2020): "Benny Biceps", "Ben Nintendo"
- Xander Bogaerts (2013–2022): "X-Man", "Bogey"
- Dennis Ray Boyd (1982–1989): "Oil Can Boyd"
- Roger Clemens (1984–1996): "Rocket"
- Rafael Devers (2017–2025): "Carita"
- Dom DiMaggio (1940–1953): "The Little Professor"
- Nomar Garciaparra (1996–2004): "Nomah"
- Bill Lee (1969–1978)": "Spaceman"
- David Ortiz (2003–2016): "Big Papi"
- Dustin Pedroia (2006–2019): "The Laser Show"
- Johnny Pesky (1942–1952): "The Needle"
- Dick Stuart (1963–1964): "Stonefingers" (or "Stone Fingers")
- Jason Varitek (1997–2011): "Tek"
- Shane Victorino (2013–2015): "Flyin' Hawaiian"
- Ted Williams (1939–1960): "The Kid", "The Splendid Splinter", "Teddy Ballgame", "The Tunnel"
- Carl Yastrzemski (1961–1983): "Yaz"
- Masataka Yoshida (2023–present): "Macho Man"
- Kevin Youkilis (2004–2012): "Youk" or "The Greek God of Walks"

==== Chicago Cubs players nicknames ====
- Grover Cleveland Alexander: Old Pete
- Ernie Banks: Mr. Cub
- Mordecai Brown: Three-Finger
- Henry Blanco: Hank White
- Ron Cey: Penguin
- Aroldis Chapman: The Cuban Missile
- Andre Dawson: The Hawk
- Leon Durham: Bull
- Carl Edwards Jr.: Stringbean Slinger
- Mark Grace: Gracie
- Ferguson Jenkins: Fergie
- Greg Maddux: Mad Dog
- Fred McGriff: Crime Dawg
- Rich Gossage: Goose
- Dave Kingman: Kong
- Kyle Hendricks: The Professor
- Gary Matthews: Sarge
- Walt Moryn: Moose
- Bill Nicholson: Swish
- Ryne Sandberg: Ryno
- Sammy Sosa: Slammin Sammy
- Mitch Williams: Wild Thing
- Marvell Wynne: Marvelous
- Carlos Zambrano: Big Z
- Don Zimmer: Popeye
- David Ross: Grandpa Rossy
- Addison Russell: Addison Muscle
- Ben Zobrist: Zorilla
- Kris Bryant: KB K-Boom
- Kyle Schwarber: Schwarbs
- Javier Baez: El Mago (The Magician)
- Albert Almora: Tico
- Alex Avila: Parkman
- Jason Heyward: J-Hey
- John Lackey: Big John
- Jose Quintana: Q
- Ian Happ: Happer
- Anthony Rizzo: Tony
- Shota Imanaga: The Throwing Philosopher, Mike Imanaga II

==== Chicago White Sox players nicknames ====
- Jose Abreu: "Pito"
- Dick Allen: "Wampum"
- Sandy Alomar Sr.: "Iron Pony"
- Luis Aparicio: "Little Louie"
- Luke Appling: "Fumblefoot" or "Kid Boots" or "Old Aches & Pains"
- Cuke Barrows, Roland Barrows: "Cuke"
- Bruno Block, James John Blochowicz: "Bruno"
- Ken Boyer: "Cap" or "Captain"
- Smoky Burgess, Forrest Harrill Burgess: "Smoky"
- Iván Calderón: "Ivan The Terrible"
- Norm Cash: "Stormin' Norman"
- Eddie Cicotte: "Knuckles"
- Rocky Colavito, Rocco Colavito: "Rocky"
- Eddie Collins: "Cocky"
- José Contreras: "Commander"
- Joe Crede: "Clutch Norris"
- Bucky Dent, Russell Earl O'Day: "Bucky" or "Bucky 'Fucking' Dent"
- Octavio Dotel: "Ol' Dirty"
- Richard Dotson: "Dot"
- Brian Downing: "Incredible Hulk"
- Red Faber, Urban Clarence Faber: "Red"
- Carlton Fisk: "Pudge"
- Nellie Fox, Jacob Nelson Fox,: "Nellie", "Little Nel", or "The Mighty Mite"
- Freddy García: "Chief"
- Ralph Garr: "Road Runner"
- Kid Gleason, William Gleason: "Kid"
- Goose Gossage, Richard Michael Gossage: "Goose" or "The White Gorilla"
- Craig Grebeck: "The Little Hurt"
- Orlando Hernández: "El Duque"
- Bo Jackson, Vincent Edward Jackson: "Bo"
- Joe Jackson: "Shoeless Joe"
- Bobby Jenks: "Big Bad Bobby Jenks"
- Lance Johnson: "One Dog"
- Ron Karkovice: "The Officer"
- Ted Kluszewski: "Big Klu"
- Paul Konerko: "Paulie"
- Carlos Lee: "El Caballo"
- Ted Lyons: "Sunday Teddy"
- Nick Madrigal: "Nicky Two Strikes"
- Jack McDowell: "Black Jack"
- Catfish Metkovich, George Michael Metkovich: "Catfish"
- Minnie Miñoso, Saturnino Orestes Armas (Arrieta) Miñoso: "Minnie" or "The Cuban Comet"
- Dave Nicholson, "Big Nick"
- Blue Moon Odom, Johnny Lee Odom: "Blue Moon"
- Magglio Ordóñez: "El Caribe Mayor (The Caribbean Mayor)" or "Mags"
- Tom Paciorek: "Wimpy"
- Donn Pall: "The Pope"
- Herbert Perry: "The Milkman"
- Bubba Phillips, John Melvin Phillips: "Bubba"
- Billy Pierce: "Billy the Kid"
- Scott Podsednik: "Pods"
- Carlos Quentin: "TCQ"
- Tim Raines: "Rock"
- Alexei Ramírez: "The Cuban Missile"
- Luis Robert Jr.: "La Pantera"
- Ray Schalk: "The Cracker"
- Tom Seaver: "Tom Terrific"
- Bill Skowron: "Moose"
- Moose Solters, Julius Joseph Soltesz: "Moose" or "Lemons"
- Nick Swisher: "Dirty Thirty"
- Frank Thomas: "The Big Hurt"
- Jim Thome: "Big Jimmy" or "Mr. Incredible"
- Javier Vázquez: "The Silent Assassin"
- Robin Ventura: "Batman"
- Dayán Viciedo: "The Tank"
- Ed Walsh: "Big Ed"
- Skeeter Webb, James Laverne Webb: "Skeeter"
- Hoyt Wilhelm: "Old Sarge"
- Walt Williams: "No Neck"
- Taffy Wright, Taft Shedron Wright:: "Taffy"
- Early Wynn: "Gus"

==== Cincinnati Reds players nicknames ====
- Sparky Anderson (George), 1970–1978 (manager): "Sparky"
- Aristides Aquino, 2019–2022, "The Punisher",
- Bronson Arroyo, 2000–2013, 2017: "Saturn Nuts", "Smokey", "Tacks", "Dirty", "BroYo" or "Free Love",
- Jeff Brantley, 1994–1997: "The Cowboy",
- Tom Browning, 1984–1994:"Mr. Perfect",
- Luis Castillo, 2017–2022: "La Piedra"
- Sean Casey , 1998–2005: "The Mayor"
- Aroldis Chapman, 2010–2015: "The Cuban Missile"
- Francisco Cordero, 2008–2011: "CoCo"
- Johnny Cueto, 2008–2015: "Johnny Beisbol"
- Eric Davis, 1984–1991, 1996: "Eric the Red" or "44 Magnum"
- Adam Dunn, 2001–2008: "Big Donkey"
- Todd Frazier, 2011–2015: "The Toddfather"
- Cesar Geronimo, 1972–1980: "The Chief"
- Ken Griffey Jr., 2000–2008: "Junior"
- Ted Kluszewski, 1947–1957: "Big Klu"
- Ernie Lombardi, 1932–1941: "Schnozz" or "Lumbago"
- Michael Lorenzen, 2015–2021: "Mikey Biceps", "Cowboy" or "Zen Master"
- Lee May, 1965–1971: "The Big Bopper"
- Joe Nuxhall, 1944–1966: "Ol' Lefthander"
- Brandon Phillips, 2002–2016: "Dat Dude"
- Frank Robinson, 1956–1965: "Robby"
- Ron Robinson, 1984–1990: "True Creature"
- Pete Rose, 1963–1978, 1984–1986: "Charlie Hustle"
- Chris Sabo, 1988–1993, 1996: "Spuds"
- Tom Seaver, 1977–1982: "Tom Terrific"
- Joey Votto, 2007–2023: "Vottomatic"
- Dmitri Young, 1998–2001: "Da Meathook"

==== Cleveland Indians/Guardians players nicknames ====
- Gary Bell: "Ding" or "Ding Dong"
- Albert Belle: "Joey", "Mr. Freeze", "Snapper"
- Lou Boudreau: "Old Shufflefoot" or "Handsome Lou"
- Carlos Carrasco: "Cookie"
- Bob Feller: "Rapid Robert", "Bullet Bob", "The Heater from Van Meter"
- Mel Harder: "Chief" or "Wimpy"
- Mike Hargrove: "The Human Rain Delay" or "Grover"
- Jim Hegan: "Shanty"
- Willis Hudlin: "Ace" or "Hud"
- Francisco Lindor: "Mr. Smile"
- Rick Manning: "Archie"
- Sam McDowell: "Sudden Sam"
- Triston McKenzie: "Dr. Sticks"
- Josh Naylor: "Naylz", "Mississauga Masher"
- Jhonkensy Noel: "Big Christmas"
- Chris Perez: "Pure Rage"
- José Ramírez: "Hosey" "J-Ram"
- Al Rosen, Albert Leonard Rosen (1947–1956): "Flip"
- Harry Simpson: "Suitcase"
- Tris Speaker: "The Grey Eagle"
- Andre Thornton: "Thunder"
- Omar Vizquel: "Little O"or "Hands of Silk"

==== Colorado Rockies players nicknames ====
- Ellis Burks, Ellis Rena Burks (1987–2004): "E.B."
- Brian Fuentes, Brian Christopher Fuentes (2001–2012): "T-Rex", "Tito"
- Andrés Galarraga, Andrés Jose Galarraga (1985–2004): "Big Cat"
- Carlos González, Carlos Eduardo Gonzalez (2008–2018): "CarGo" or "Little Pony"
- Todd Helton, Todd Lynn Helton (1997–2013): "T.L." or "The Toddfather"
- Steve Reed, Steven Vincent Reed (1992–2005): "Father Time"
- Wilin Rosario, Wilin Arismendy Rosario (2011–2015): "Baby Bull"
- Troy Tulowitzki, Troy Trevor Tulowitzki (2006–2015): "Tulo"
- Larry Walker, Larry Kenneth Robert Walker (1989–2005): "Booger" or "The Canadian Clubber"
- Charlie Blackmon, Charles Cobb Blackmon (2011–2024): "Charlie" or "Chuck Nazty"
- Nolan Arenado, Nolan James Arenado (2013–Present): "Sandblaster"

==== Detroit Tigers player nicknames ====
- Sparky Anderson, George Lee Anderson (manager, 1979–1995): "Sparky"
- Skeeter Barnes, William Henry Barnes (infield, outfield, 1983–1994): "Skeeter"
- Miguel Cabrera (2003–2023): "Miggy
- Ty Cobb (1905–1926): "The Georgia Peach"
- Mark Fidrych (1976–1980): "The Bird"
- Cecil Fielder (1990–1995) "Big Daddy"
- Hank Greenberg (1930, 1933–1941, 1945–1946): "Hammerin Hank", the "Hebrew Hammer"
- Aurelio Lopez: (1979–1985): "Señor Smoke"
- Charlie Maxwell: (1955–1962): "Paw Paw"
- James McCann (2015–present): "McCannon"
- Schoolboy Rowe, Lynwood Thomas Rowe (1932–1942): "Schoolboy"
- Lou Whitaker (1977–1995): "Sweet Lou"
- Charlie Gehringer (1924–1942): "The Mechanical Man"
- Lance Parrish (1977–1986): "The Big Wheel"
- Sam Crawford (1903–1917): "Wahoo Sam"
- Dizzy Trout (1939–1951): "Dizzy"
- Norm Cash (1960–1974): "Stormin' Norman"
- Mickey Cochrane (1934–1937): "Black Mike"
- Gates Brown (1963–1975): "Gates"

==== Houston Astros players nicknames ====
- Jose Altuve: "El Pequeño Gigante", "El Tramposo", "Tuve"
- Yordan Alvarez: "Air Yordan"
- Spencer Arrighetti: "Spaghetti"
- Jeff Bagwell: "Bags", "Bagpipes"
- Lance Berkman: "Big Puma" or "Fat Elvis"
- Craig Biggio: "Bidge" or "Killer B"
- Michael Brantley: "Dr. Smooth"
- Alex Bregman: "Breggy"
- Enos Cabell: "Big E"
- José Cruz: "Cheo"
- Yuli Gurriel: "Piña"
- Carlos Lee: "El Caballo" (The Horse)
- Martin Maldonado: "Machete"
- Chas McCormick: "Chas Chomp"
- Jake Meyers: "Rake"
- Joe Morgan: "Little Joe"
- Jeremy Peña: "La Tormenta"
- Doug Rader: "The Red Rooster", "Rojo" or "Rooster"
- Nolan Ryan: "The Express"
- Kyle Tucker: "King Tuck"
- Justin Verlander: "The Monarch"
- Bob Watson: "Bull"
- Jimmy Wynn: "The Toy Cannon"

==== Kansas City Royals players nicknames ====
- Willie Aikens, Willie Mays Aikens, 1977–1985: "Ack Ack"
- Kevin Appier, Robert Kevin Appier, 1989–2004: "Ape"
- Steve Balboni, Stephen Charles Balboni (1981–1993): "Bye Bye" or "Bones"
- Buddy Biancalana, Roland Americo Biancalana (1982–1987): "Buddy"
- George Brett, George Howard Brett (1973–1993): "Mullet"
- Billy Butler, William Raymond Butler Jr. (2007–2014): "Country Breakfast"
- Al Cowens, Alfred Edward Cowens Jr. (1974–1986): "A. C."
- Johnny Damon, Johnny David Damon (1995–2012): "The Caveman", "Judas", or "Johnny Cash" (by Red Sox fans)
- Tom Gordon, Thomas Gordon (1988–2009): "Flash"
- Wally Joyner, Wallace Keith Joyner (1986–2001): "Wally World"
- Ed Kirkpatrick, Edgar Leon Kirkpatrick (1962–1977): "Spanky"
- Buck Martinez, John Albert Martinez (1969–1986): "Buck"
- Roger Nelson, Roger Eugene Nelson (1967–1976): "Spider"
- Amos Otis, Amos Joseph Otis (1967–1984): "A.O." or "Famous Amos"
- Freddie Patek, Frederick Joseph Patek (1968–1981): "The Flea" or "Moochie"
- Marty Pattin, Martin William Pattin (1968–1980): "Bulldog" or "Duck"
- Lou Piniella, Louis Victor Piniella (1964–1984): "Sweet Lou"
- Darrell Porter, Darrell Ray Porter (1971–1987): "Double Barrel Darrell"
- Dan Quisenberry, Daniel Raymond Quisenberry (1979–1990): "Quiz" or "Q"
- Joe Randa, Joseph Gregory Randa (1995–2006): "The Joker"
- Bret Saberhagen, Bret William Saberhagen (1984–2001): "Sabes"
- Joakim Soria (2007–2011, 2016–2017) "The Mexicutioner"
- Paul Splittorff (1970–1984) "Splitt"
- Kurt Stillwell, Kurt Andrew Stillwell (1986–1996): "Opie"
- Jeff Suppan, Jeffrey Scot Suppan (1995–2012): "Soup"
- Mac Suzuki, Makoto Suzuki (1996–2002): "Mac"
- John Wathan, John David Wathan (1976–1985): "Duke"
- Zack Greinke, Donald Zackary Greinke (2004–2010, 2022–2023): "B. A. Z."
- Salvador Perez, Salvador Johan Pérez Díaz (2011–present): "El Niño", "Salvy"
- Vinnie Pasquantino, Vincent Joseph Pasquantino (2022–present): "Pasquatch"
- Bobby Witt Jr., Robert Andrew Witt Jr. (2023–present): "Bobby Baseball"

==== Los Angeles Angels of Anaheim players nicknames ====
- Sandy Alomar Sr., Santos (Conde) Alomar Sr. (1964–1978): "Iron Pony"
- Garret Anderson, Garret Joseph Anderson (1994–2008): "G.A."
- Don Baylor, Don Edward Baylor (1970–1988): "Groove" or "The Sneak Thief"
- Robert Belinsky (1962–1964): "Bo"
- Rod Carew, Rodney Cline Carew (1967–1985): "Sir Rodney"
- Chili Davis, Charles Theodore Davis (1981–1999): "Chili" or "Chili Bowl"
- Gary DiSarcina, Gary Thomas DiSarcina (1989–2000): "DiSar"
- Brian Downing, Brian Jay Downing (1973–1992): "Incredible Hulk"
- Wally Joyner, Wallace Keith Joyner (1986–2001): "Wally World"
- John Lackey, John Derran Lackey (2002–2009): "Bender"
- Andy Messersmith, John Alexander Messersmith (1968–1979): "Bluto"
- Shohei Ohtani (2018–2023): "Shotime"
- Lance Parrish, Lance Michael Parrish (1977–1995): "Big Wheel"
- Troy Percival, Troy Eugene Percival (1995–2004): "Percy"
- Luis Polonia, Luis Andrew (Almonte) Polonia (1987–2000): "Catch 22" or "Lapa"
- Mickey Rivers, John Milton Rivers (1970–1984): "Mick The Quick", "Gozzlehead", or "Mickey Mouth"
- Lee Thomas, James Leroy Thomas (1961–1968): "Mad Dog"
- Mike Trout, (2011– ): "The Millville Meteor", "Fishman"
- Clyde Wright (1966–1975): "Skeeter"

==== Los Angeles Dodgers players nicknames ====
- Sandy Koufax, "The Left Arm of God", "Dandy Sandy", "Koo-Foo"
- Roy Campanella, "Campy"
- Ron Cey, "The Penguin"
- Don Drysdale, "Big D"
- Leo Durocher, "The Lip"
- Jim Gilliam, "Junior"
- Tony Gonsolin, "The Cat Man"
- Orel Hershiser, "Bulldog"
- Frank Howard, "Hondo"
- Roki Sasaki, "The Monster of the Reiwa Era"
- Lou Johnson, "Sweet Lou"
- Don Newcombe, "Newk"
- Shohei Ohtani (2024–present): "Shotime"
- Alejandro Peña, "Slow"
- Yasiel Puig, "Wild Horse"
- Phil Regan, "The Vulture"
- Fernando Valenzuela, "El Toro"
- Clayton Kershaw, "The Claw", "Kersh"
- Corey Seager: "Kyle's Brother"
- Duke Snider, "The Duke", "The Duke of Flatbush", "The Silver Fox"
- John Roseboro, "Rosy", "Gabby"

==== Florida/Miami Marlins players nicknames ====
- Sandy Alcántara, "Sandman"
- Miguel Cabrera, "Miggy"
- Wei-Yin Chen, "The Coverman"
- Jeff Conine, "Mr. Marlin"
- José Fernández, "Niño"
- Jesús Luzardo, "The Lizard King", "Zeus"
- Marcell Ozuna, "The Big Bear"
- Hanley Ramírez, "El Trece", "Han-Ram"
- JT Realmuto, "Real"
- Dee Strange-Gordon, "Flash"
- Christian Yelich, "Yeli"

==== Milwaukee Brewers players nicknames ====
- Ryan Braun, "Hebrew Hammer" , "Brauny"
- Corbin Burnes, "Burnsey"
- Chris Capuano, "Cappuccino"
- Jackson Chourio, "K2"
- Scooter Gennett, "Scooty"
- Josh Hader, "Haderade"
- Skip Lockwood, Claude Edward Lockwood Jr.: "Skip"
- Kirk Nieuwenhuis, "Captain Kirk"
- Travis Shaw, "The Mayor of Ding Dong City"
- Devin Williams,"The Airbender"
- Robin Yount,"The Kid"
- George Scott,"Boomer"

==== Minnesota Twins players nicknames ====
- Willians Astudillo: "La Tortuga"
- Tom Brunansky: "Bruno"
- Rod Carew: "Sir Rodney"
- Carlos Correa: "I Am Groot"
- Gary Gaetti: "The Rat" or "G-Man"
- Jim Grant: "Mudcat"
- Kent Hrbek: "Herbie"
- Torii Hunter: "Spiderman", "T-Nuts",
- Harmon Killebrew: "Killer"
- Chuck Knoblauch: "Skippy" or "Knobby"
- Tony Oliva: "Tony-O"
- Kirby Puckett: "Puck"
- Johan Santana: "El Gocho", "Cytana", "Jo-Jo", or "Supernatural"
- Zoilo Versalles: "Zorro"
- Frank Viola: "Sweet Music"
- Byron Buxton: "Byro"
- Nelson Cruz: "Nellie" or "boomstick"
- Joseph Nathan: "Joe"
- Jose Berrios: "La Makina"
- Josh Donaldson: "The Bringer Of Rain"
- Jorge Polanco: "Chulo"

==== Montreal Expos players nicknames ====
- Gary Carter: "The Kid"
- Andre Dawson: "Hawk"
- Andres Galarraga: "The Big Cat"
- Bill Lee: "Spaceman"
- Tim Raines: "Rock"
- Don Stanhouse: "Stan the Man Unusual"
- Rusty Staub: "Le Grand Orange"

==== New York Mets players nicknames ====
- Pete Alonso: "The Polar Bear"
- Jeff McNeil: "The Squirrel""The Flying Squirrel"
- Francisco Lindor: "Mr. Smile"
- Edgardo Alfonzo: "Fonzie"
- Wally Backman, Walter Wayne Backman: "Cabbage Patch", "Finster", or "Wally"
- Gary Carter, Gary Edmund Carter (1974–1992): "The Kid"
- Ed Charles: "The Glider"
- Choo-Choo Coleman, Clarence Coleman: "Choo-Choo"
- David Cone: "Coney"
- Edwin Diaz: "Sugar"
- Duffy Dyer: "Duffy" "Duf"
- Lenny Dykstra: "Nails" or "The Dude"
- Sid Fernandez: "El Sid"
- Dwight Gooden: "Doc" or "Dr. K"
- Matt Harvey "The Real Deal" "The Dark Knight of Gotham""The Dark Knight"
- Bud Harrelson, Derrel McKinley Harrelson: "Bud", or "Mini-Hawk"
- Keith Hernandez: "Mex"
- Howard Johnson: "HoJo"
- Dave Kingman: "Kong", "Sky", "Big Bird" "King Kong", or "Kong Kingman", or "Sky King"
- Jerry Koosman, Jerome Martin Koosman: "Kooz" or "Jerry"
- Ed Kranepool: "Krane", "The Krane", "Easy Ed", "Steady Eddie"
- Dave Magadan: "Mags"
- Steven Matz Iron Matz
- Willie Mays: "The Say-Hey Kid"
- Lee Mazzilli: "The Italian Stallion" or "Maz"
- Kevin McReynolds: "Big Mac"
- Félix Millán, Félix Bernardo (Martinez) Millán: "The Cat"
- John Milner: "The Hammer"
- Mike Pelfrey: "Pelf" or "Big Pelf"
- Mike Piazza: "Pizza Man", "The Monster"
- Francisco Rodríguez: Frankie or K-Rod
- Nolan Ryan: "The Ryan Express"
- Tom Seaver: "Tom Terrific" or "The Franchise"
- Rusty Staub, Daniel Joseph Staub: "Rusty" or "Le Grand Orange"
- John Stearns: "Bad Dude" or "Dude"
- Casey Stengel, Charles Dillon Stengel: "Casey" or "The Old Perfessor"
- Darryl Strawberry: "The Straw Man", "Pulled Muscle Face", "Straw"
- Noah Syndergaard: "Thor"
- Ron Swoboda: "Rocky"
- Marv Throneberry: "Marvelous Marv"
- Billy Wagner: "Billy The Kid", "Wags" or "The Sandman"
- Mookie Wilson: William Hayward Wilson: "The Mookster" or "Mookie"
- Zack Wheeler: The Wheel Deal
- David Wright: "Captain America"
- Anthony Young: 'A.Y."
- Wilmer Flores: "Walk-off Wilmer"

==== New York Yankees nicknames ====
- Ron Blomberg: "Boomer"
- Jim Coates: "The Mummy"
- Joe DiMaggio: "Joltin' Joe", "Joe D", "The Yankee Clipper"
- Jasson Domínguez: "El Marciano" (The Martian)
- Whitey Ford: "The Chairman of the Board"
- Frankie Crosetti: "Crow"
- Bill Dickey: "The Man Nobody Knows"
- Lou Gehrig: "Buster", "The Iron Horse"
- Rich Gossage: "Goose"
- Ron Guidry: "The Louisiana Lightning", "Gator"
- Orlando Hernández: "El Duque"
- Reggie Jackson: "Mr. October"
- Derek Jeter: "The Captain", "Mr. November", "Captain Clutch"
- Mickey Mantle: "The Commerce Comet", "The Mick"
- Jordan Montgomery: "Gumby"
- Didi Gregorius: "Sir Didi"
- Hideki Matsui: "Godzilla"
- Don Mattingly: "Donnie Baseball"
- Thurman Munson: "Tugboat", "Squatty Body", "Squatty", "Pudge", or "The Wall"
- Graig Nettles: "Puff"
- Paul O'Neill: "Paulie", "The Warrior"
- Carl Pavano, "American Idle"
- Willie Randolph: "Little Willie" or "Mickey"
- Phil Rizzuto: "Scooter"
- Alex Rodriguez: "A-Rod"
- Babe Ruth: "The Babe", "Bambino", "The Sultan of Swat"
- Gary Sánchez: "The Kraken"
- Bill Skowron: "Moose"
- Roy White: "Mr. Consistent Yankee"
- Mariano Rivera: "Mo", "Sandman"
- Aaron Judge: "The Judge", "All Rise"

==== Oakland Athletics players nicknames ====
- Grant Balfour: "Balfour Rage"
- Sal Bando, Salvatore Leonard Bando (1966–1981): "Captain Sal" or "Sal"
- Bert Campaneris, Dagoberto (Blanco) Campaneris (1964–1983): "Campy"
- José Canseco, José (Capas) Canseco Jr. (1985–2001): "Parkway Joe" or "The Chemist"
- Eric Chavez, Eric César Chávez (1998– ): "Chavy"
- Khris Davis: "Khrush"
- Dennis Eckersley: "Eck" or "The Eck"
- Mike Epstein: "Superjew"
- Jason Giambi, Jason Gilbert Giambi: "The Giambino"
- Rickey Henderson: "Man of Steal" or "Style Dog"
- Catfish Hunter, James Augustus Hunter (1965–1979): "Catfish"
- Reggie Jackson, Reginald Martinez Jackson (1967–1987): "Mr. October"
- Sean Manaea: "The Throwin' Samoan"
- Mark McGwire, Mark David McGwire (1986–2001): "Big Mac" or "Big Red"
- Mason Miller: "The Reaper"
- Blue Moon Odom, Johnny Lee Odom (1964–1976): "Blue Moon"
- Dave Parker: "Cobra"
- Tony Phillips, Keith Anthony Phillips (1982–1999): "Tony" or "Tony The Tiger" (bestowed by Tigers' announcer Ernie Harwell)
- Rubén Sierra: "El Caballo", "El Indio", "Big Rube", or "Ruben Slam-wich"
- Dave Stewart, David Keith Stewart (1978–1995): "Smoke"
- Miguel Tejada, Miguel Odalis (Martinez) Tejada (1997– ): "The Bus" or "Miggy"
- Frank Thomas, Frank Edward Thomas (1990– ): "Big Hurt"
- Billy Williams, Billy Leo Williams (1959–1976): "Sweet Swingin' Billy from Whistler"

==== Philadelphia Phillies players nicknames ====
- Dick Allen, Richard Anthony Allen (1963–1969): "Wampum", "Richie"
- Morrie Arnovich, Morris Arnovich (1936–1940): "Snooker"
- Richie Ashburn, Donald Richard Ashburn (1948–1959): "Whitey"
- Steve Bedrosian, Stephen Wayne Bedrosian (1986–1989): "Bedrock"
- Larry Bowa, Lawrence Robert Bowa (1970–1981): "Gnat"
- Kitty Bransfield, William Edward Bransfield (1898–1911): "Kitty"
- Pat Burrell, Patrick Brian Burrell (2000–2008): "Pat The Bat", "Patty Baseball"
- Putsy Caballero, Ralph Joseph Caballero (1944–1952): "Putsy"
- Steve Carlton, Steven Norman Carlton (1972–1986): "Lefty"
- Nick Castellanos, Nicholas Alexander Castellanos (2022–Present): "The Grim Reaper"
- Pearce Chiles, Pearce Nuget Chiles (1899–1900): "What's The Use"
- Gavvy Cravath, Clifford Carlton Cravath (1908–1920): "Cactus Gavvy", "Cactus"
- Clay Dalrymple, Clayton Errol Dalrymple (1960–1971): "Dimples"
- Darren Daulton Darren Arthur Daulton (1983–1997): "Dutch"
- Spud Davis, Virgil Lawrence Davis (1928–1945): "Spud"
- Mickey Doolan, Michael Joseph Doolan (1905–1918): "Doc", "Mickey"
- Red Dooin, Charles Sebastian Dooin (1902–1916): "Red"
- Lenny Dykstra, Leonard Kyle Dykstra (1989–1996): "Nails", "Dude"
- Bob Ferguson, Robert Vavasour Ferguson (1871–1884): "Death to Flying Things"
- Chick Fraser, Charles Carrolton Fraser (1896–1909): "Chick"
- Tom Gordon, Thomas Flynn Gordon (2006–2008): "Flash"
- Roy Halladay, Harry Leroy Halladay (2010–2013): "Doc"
- Granny Hamner, Granville Wilbur Hamner: "Granny", or "Ham"
- Von Hayes, Von Francis Hayes (1981–1992): "Purple Hayes", "Five-for-One", "Old 5–4–1"
- Ryan Howard, Ryan James Howard (2004–2016): "The Big Piece"
- Pete Incaviglia, Peter Joseph Incaviglia (1993–1994): "Inky"
- Willie Jones, Willie Edward Jones (1947–1959): "Puddin' Head"
- Otto Knabe, Franz Otto Knabe (1905–1916): "Dutch"
- Brad Lidge, Brad Thomas Lidge (2008–2011): "Lights out Lidge"
- Mike Lieberthal, Michael Scott Lieberthal (1994– ): "Lieby"
- Stan Lopata, Stanley Edward Lopata (1948–1960): "Stash"
- Greg Luzinski, Gregory Michael Luzinski (1970–1980): "The Bull"
- Garry Maddox, Garry Lee Maddox (1975–1986): "The Secretary of Defense"
- Gary Matthews, Gary Nathaniel Mathews (1981–1983): "Sarge"
- Jose Mesa, José Ramón Nova Mesa (2001–2003): "Joe Table"
- Bake McBride, Arnold Ray McBride (1977–1981): "Bake", "Shake and Bake"
- Mickey Morandini, Michael Robert Morandini (1990–2000): "Dandy Little Glove Man"
- Sam Nahem (1942, 1948): "Subway Sam"
- Dode Paskert, George Henry Paskert: "Dode", "Honey Boy"
- Jimmy Rollins, James Calvin Rollins (2000–2015): "J-Roll", "Wishlist",
- Carlos Ruiz, Carlos Joaquín Ruiz (2006–2016): "Chooch"
- Juan Samuel, Juan Milton Samuel (1983–1989): "Sammy"
- Curt Schilling, Curtis Montague Schilling (1992–2000): "Schill"
- Mike Schmidt, Michael Jack Schmidt (1972–1989): "Schmiddy", "Iron Mike"
- Lonnie Smith, Lonnie Smith (1978–1981): "Skates"
- Dick Stuart, Richard Lee Stuart (1965): "Dr. Strangeglove"
- John Titus, John Franklin Titus (1903–1912): "Silent John"
- Chase Utley, Chase Cameron Utley (2013–2015): "The Man"
- Shane Victorino, Shane Patrick Victorino (2005–2012): "The Flyin' Hawaiian"
- Pinky Whitney, Arthur Carter Whitney (1928–1939): "Pinky"
- Cy Williams, Fred Williams: "Cy"
- Luke Williams (2021): "Captain America"
- Mitch Williams (1991–1993): "Wild Thing"
- Jimmie Wilson, James Wilson (1923–1940): "Ace"
- Vance Worley, Vance Richard Worley (2010–2012): "Vanimal"
- 1950 Philadelphia Phillies: "Whiz Kids"
- 1983 Philadelphia Phillies: "Wheez Kids"
- 1993 Philadelphia Phillies: "Macho Row"

==== Pittsburgh Pirates players nicknames ====
- Honus Wagner (1900–1917) "The Flying Dutchman"
- Paul Waner (1926–1940) "Big Poison"
- Lloyd Waner (1927–1941) "Little Poison"
- Elroy Face (1953, 1955–1968) "The Bullpen Baron"
- Bill Mazeroski (1956–1972) "Maz"
- Willie Stargell (1962–1982) "Pops"
- Dave Parker (1973–1983) "The Cobra"
- Kent Tekulve (1974–1985) "Teke"
- John Candelaria (1975–1985) "The Candy Man"
- Bill Madlock (1979–1985) "Mad Dog"
- Andy Van Slyke (1987-1994) "Slick"
- Joel Hanrahan (2009–2012) "The Hammer"
- Andrew McCutchen (2009–2017, 2023–2025) "Cutch"
- Pedro Alvarez (2010–2015) "The Big Bull" or "El Toro"
- Josh Harrison (2011–2018) "J-Hay"
- Jeff Locke (2011–2016) "Robin"
- Jason Grilli (2011-2014) "Grilled Cheese"
- Michael McKenry (2011–2013) "The Fort"
- A. J. Burnett (2012–2013, 2015) "Batman"
- Travis Snider (2012–2014, 2015) "Lunchbox"
- Francisco Liriano (2013–2016, 2019) "Frankie"
- Mark Melancon (2013–2016) "Mark the Shark"
- Gregory Polanco (2014–2021) "El Coffee"
- Kyle Lobstein (2016) "The Lobster"
- Felipe Vázquez (2016–2019) "Nightmare"
- Chris Archer (2018-19) "Flaco Fuerte"
- Bryan Reynolds (2019-present) "B-Rey"
- David Bednar (2021-2025) "The Renegade"
- John Nogowski (2021) "The Big Nogowski"
- Dauri Moreta (2023–2025) "Big Bank"
- Paul Skenes (2024–present) "The Gas Station", "Big Hoss"
- Spencer Horwitz (2025-present) "The Hebrew Hammer"
- Jhostynxon Garcia (2026-present) "The Password"
- Marcell Ozuna (2026) "The Big Bear"
- Esmerlyn Valdez (2026-present) "The Magician"

==== St. Louis Cardinals players nicknames ====
- Harrison Bader: "Tots"
- Daniel Descalso: "Dirty Dan", "Disco Dan"
- Tommy Edman: "Tommy Triples"
- Jim Edmonds: "Jimmy Ballgame", "Jimmy Baseball"
- Jack Flaherty: "JFlare", "Flare"
- Dexter Fowler: "Sexy Dexy"
- Bob Gibson: "Hoot", "Gibby"
- Jim Galloway: "Bad News"
- Al Hrabosky: "The Mad Hungarian"
- Jason Isringhausen: "Izzy"
- Pepper Martin: "Wild Horse of the Osage"
- Joe Medwick: "Ducky"
- Wilmer Mizell: "Vinegar Bend"
- Yadier Molina: "Yadi"
- Stan Musial: "Stan the Man"
- Lars Nootbaar: "Tacchan", "Noot"
- José Oquendo: "The Secret Weapon"
- Albert Pujols: "The Machine"
- Ken Reitz: "Zamboni"
- Skip Schumaker: "Schu" or "Skip"
- Enos Slaughter: "Country"
- Ozzie Smith: "The Wizard"
- Adam Wainwright: "Waino"

==== San Diego Padres players nicknames ====
- Steve Garvey, (1969–1987): "Mr. Clean" or "Senator"
- Dave Winfield, (1973–1995): "The Wave" or "Winnie"
- Garry Templeton, (1976–1991): "Jump Steady"
- Terry Kennedy, (1978–1991): "Orville Moody"
- Doug Gwosdz, (1981–1984): "Eyechart"
- Tony Gwynn, (1982–2001): "Mr. Padre" and "Captain Video"
- Kevin McReynolds, (1983–1994): "Big Mac"
- John Kruk, (1986–1995): "Krukker"
- Andy Benes, (1989–2002): "Rainman"
- Fred McGriff, (1991–1993): "Crime Dog"
- Ryan Klesko, (1992–2007): "Rhino"
- Trevor Hoffman, (1993–2010): "Hoffy"
- Bip Roberts, (1994–1995): "Bip"
- Manny Machado, (2019–present); "El Ministro"
- Fernando Tatis Jr., (2019–present): "El Niño"
- Ha-seong Kim, (2020–present): "Peace Prince"
- Jake Cronenworth, (2020–present): "Crone"
- Xander Bogaerts (2023–present): "X-Man", "Bogey"
- Luis Arraez, 2024–present: "La Regadera"
- Donovan Solano, (2024): "Donnie Barrels"
- Jackson Merrill, (2024–present): "Action Jackson"

==== San Francisco Giants players nicknames ====
- Christy Mathewson (1900–1916): "Big Six," "The Christian Gentleman," "The Gentleman's Hurler"
- Harry Danning (1938–1941): "Harry the Horse"
- Sal Maglie (1945–1955): "The Barber"
- Willie Mays (1951–1972): "The Say Hey Kid"
- Orlando Cepeda (1958–1966): "Peruchin," "Baby Bull"
- Willie McCovey (1959–1973): "Stretch"
- John Montefusco (1974–1980): "The Count"
- Jeffrey Leonard (1977–1990): "Penitentiary Face," "HacMan," "Hackman"
- Will Clark (1986–1993): "Will The Thrill"
- Kirk Rueter (1996–2005): "Woody"
- Tim Lincecum (2007–2015): "The Freak"
- Pablo Sandoval (2008–2014): "Panda"
- Madison Bumgarner (2009–2019): "Mad Bum"
- Buster Posey (2009–2021): "Buster"
- Pat Burrell (2010–2011): "Pat The Bat," "Patty Baseball"
- Cody Ross (2010–2011): "Ross The Boss"
- Javier Lopez (2010–2016): "Night Train"
- Brandon Belt (2011–2022): "Baby Giraffe"
- Hunter Pence (2012–2018, 2020): "The Reverend"
- Jeff Samardzija (2016–2020): "Shark"
- Gregor Blanco (2012–2016, 2018): "White Shark"
- Jung-Hoo Lee (2023–present): "Grandson Of The Wind"

==== Seattle Mariners players nicknames ====
- Jay Buhner: "Bone"
- Julio Cruz: "Juice"
- Nelson Cruz: "Boomstick" and "Nelly"
- Logan Gilbert: "Walter"
- Ken Griffey Jr.: "The Kid" and "Junior"
- Franklin Gutiérrez: "Death to Flying Things"
- Félix Hernández: "King Felix"
- Dave Henderson: "Hendu"
- Randy Johnson: "Big Unit"
- Cal Raleigh: "Big Dumper"
- Julio Rodríguez: "JRod"
- Michael Saunders: "The Condor"

==== Tampa Bay Devil Rays/Rays player nicknames ====
Player	Years	Nickname	Ref
Fred McGriff	1998–2001	"Crime Dog"	
Aubrey Huff	2000–2006	"Huff Daddy"	
Kevin Kiermaier	2013–2024	"The Outlaw"	
Brandon Lowe	2018–present	"Dawg", "Big Dawg", "Bamm-Bamm"	
Mike Zunino	2020–2024	"Z", "Big Z"	
Randy Arozarena	2020–2024	"El Cohete Cubano"	
Shane McClanahan	2020–present	"Sugar Shane"	
Brett Phillips	2020–2022	"Maverick", "The American Shohei Ohtani"	
Nelson Cruz	2021	"Boomstick", "Nelly"	

==== Texas Rangers players nicknames ====
Player	Years	Nickname	Ref
Hanser Alberto		"Radio"	
Antonio Alfonseca		"El Pulpo (The Octopus)"	
Elvis Andrus		"El Comando"	
Len Barker		"Large Lenny"	
Larvell Blanks		"Sugar Bear"	
Hank Blalock		"Hank the Tank"	
Jerry Browne		"The Governor"	
Steve Buechele		"Boo"	
Will Clark		"The Thrill"	
Francisco Cordero		"Coco"	
Nelson Cruz	2006–2013	"Boomstick", "Nelly"	
Danny Darwin		"Bonham Bullet" or Doctor Death"	
Chris Davis	2008–2011	"Crush"	
Delino DeShields Jr.		"Snacks"	
Prince Fielder		"Uncle Phil"	
Jeff Francoeur		"Frenchy"	
Craig Gentry		"Kitten Face"	
Juan González		"Señor Octubre"	
Rusty Greer		"The Red Baron"	
Cole Hamels		"Hollywood"	
Bill Hands		"Froggy"	
Mike Hargrove		"The Human Rain Delay"	
Tom Henke		"Terminator"	
Derek Holland		"The Dutch Oven"	
Frank Howard		"Hondo" or "The Capital Punisher"	
Pete Incaviglia		"Inky"	
Jim Kern		"Amazing Emu"	
Colby Lewis		"Cobra"	
Nomar Mazara		"The Big Chill"	
Kevin Mench		"Shrek"	
Mario Mendoza		"Manos de Seda (Satin Hands)"	
Dale Mohorcic		"The Horse"	
Rougned Odor		"Stinky" or "Roogie"	
Al Oliver		"Scoop"	
Tom Paciorek		"Wimpy"	
Dave Rajsich		"The Blade"	
Mickey Rivers		"Mick the Quick"	
Iván Rodríguez		"Pudge"	
Kenny Rogers		"The Gambler"	
Robbie Ross Jr.		"The Lawnmower"	
Ruben Sierra		"El Caballo"	
Don Slaught		"Sluggo"	
Don Stanhouse		"Stan the Man Unusual" or "Full Pack"	
Dave Stewart		"Smoke"	
Mickey Tettleton		"Froot Loops"	
César Tovar		"Pepito"	
Ugueth Urbina		"Oogie"	
Mitch Williams		"Wild Thing"	

==== Toronto Blue Jays players nicknames ====
Player	Years	Nickname	Ref
Dave Stieb	1979–1992	"Doctor K"	
Joe Carter	1991–1997	"Joe Cool"	
Roberto Alomar	1991–1995	"Robbie"	
José Bautista	2008–2017	"Joey Bats"	
Edwin Encarnación	2009–2016	"E²" / "Edwing"	
Kevin Pillar	2013–2019	"Superman"	
Marcus Stroman	2014–2019	"Stro Show"	
Aaron Sanchez	2014–2019	"Sanchize"	
Josh Donaldson	2015–2018	"Bringer of Rain"	
Vladimir Guerrero Jr.	2019–present	"Vladdy" / "Vladdy Jr."	
Alek Manoah	2021–2025	"Big Puma"	
Kevin Gausman	2022–present	"Gaus" / "Gas Man"	
Chris Bassitt	2023–2025	"C Bass" / "The Hound"	
Kazuma Okamoto	2026–present	"Big Oak"	

==== Washington Nationals players nicknames ====
- Mike Epstein, "Super Jew"
- Bryce Harper, "Bam Bam" and "Mondo"
- Howie Kendrick, "Truck"
- Max Scherzer, "Mad Max"
- Anthony Rendon, "Tony", "Ant", "Rendy", "Tone" or "Tony Two Bags"
- Juan Soto, "Childish Bambino"
- Ryan Zimmerman, "Mr. National" or "Zim"

=== Negro leagues ===
Player	First year	Last year	Nickname(s)	Ref
Herman Andrews	1930	1943	"Jabbo"	
George Britt	1917	1945	"Chippy" or "Public Enemy Number One"	
Darlton Cooper	1923	1940	"Daltie", "Darltie", or "Dolly"	
George Reuben Curry	1920	1932	"Rube"	
Homer Curry	1928	1947	"Goose"	
Lorenzo Davis	1942	1950	"Piper"	
Walter C. Davis	1918	1938	"Steel Arm"	
Elwood DeMoss	1910	1930	"Bingo"	
William Dismukes	1909	1932	"Dizzy"	
Herbert Dixon	1922	1937	"Rap"	
Bill Drake	1920	1927	"Plunk"	
Macajah Eggleston	1919	1934	"Mack"	
Antonio María Garcia	1882	1905	"El Inglés" (The Englishman)	
William Gatewood	1906	1929	"Big Bill"	
Arthur Henderson	1922	1931	"Rats"	
Norman Jackson	1934	1945	"Jelly"	
Clarence Jenkins	1920	1940	"Fats"	
Grant Johnson	1893	1923	"Home Run"	
Mamie Johnson	1953	1955	"Peanut"	
Oscar Johnson	1920	1933	"Heavy"	
Stuart Jones	1932	1938	"Slim"	
Cecil Kaiser	1939	1952	"Aspirin Tablet Man" or "Minute Man"	
Walter Lee Joseph	1922	1940	"Newt"	
William Lowe	1921	1931	"Kid"	
Dave Malarcher	1916	1934	"Gentleman Dave"	
Wilson Martin	1925	1928	"Stack"	
Walter Moore	1920	1926	"Dobie"	
Carroll Mothell	1914	1934	"Dink"	
Grady Orange	1925	1931	"Dip"	
Theodore Radcliffe	1929	1946	"Double Duty" or "Ted"	
Richard Redding	1911	1932	"Cannonball" or "Dick"	
Merven Ryan	1915	1932	"Red"	
James Taylor	1909	1935	"Candy Jim"	
James Thompson	1920	1933	"Sandy"	
Andrew Williams	1909	1928	"String Bean"	
James Winters	1919	1933	"Nip" or "Jesse"	
Burnis Wright	1932	1945	"Wild Bill"	

== See also ==
- List of nicknamed MLB games and plays
- Lists of nicknames – nickname list articles on Wikipedia
- List of athletes by nickname
- List of nicknames in basketball
- List of NFL nicknames
