= Bucco (disambiguation) =

Bucco is a genus of birds.

Bucco may also refer to:

- Fritz Bucco, Swiss footballer in the early 1920s
- Senator Bucco (disambiguation)
  - Anthony M. Bucco (born 1962), American politician
  - Anthony R. Bucco (1938–2019), American politician
- Bucco Bruce, a derogatory nickname for the Tampa Bay Buccaneers
- Buccos, a nickname for the Pittsburgh Pirates baseball team
- the surname of several characters in the television series The Sopranos

== See also ==
- Osso buco, a veal dish that originated in Lombardy, Italy
- Bucca (disambiguation)
- Bucko (disambiguation)
