= Pukka =

Pukka, an adulatory slang adjective, may refer to:

== Arts ==
- Pukka Orchestra, a Canadian new wave band in the 1980s
- Pukka or pucca, a category of Indian vernacular architecture

== Brands ==
- Pukka Pies, a United Kingdom foods manufacturer
- Pukka Herbs, an Ayurvedic herbal remedies company
- Pukka Electric MiniBike, a small, battery-powered vehicle

== Individuals ==
- Erkki Pukka, Finnish 1960s ski jumper
- Mikko Pukka, Finnish ice hockey defenceman
- Pukka, racehorse who won the 1925 Hobart Cup in Tasmania

== See also ==
- Pucca (disambiguation)
- Puka (disambiguation)
- Pukka sahib, an Indian term for British civil servants
