= Skip =

Skip or Skips may refer to:

== Acronyms ==
- INPP5K, an enzyme also called SKIP, short for "Skeletal muscle and kidney enriched inositol phosphatase"
- Simple Key-Management for Internet Protocol
- SKIP of New York (Sick Kids need Involved People), a non-profit agency aiding families with sick or developmentally disabled children
- System of Kanji Indexing by Patterns, an original system for indexing kanji by the Kodansha Kanji Learner's Dictionary

== Business ==
- Skip (transportation company), scooter sharing service
- Skip Ltd., a Japanese video game developer
- SkipTheDishes, food delivery company

== Characters ==
- Skip Ricter, a character in the movie Cars
- the title character of the autobiography My Dog Skip by Willie Morris and the film adaptation of the same name
- Skip, a minor character from the TV series Angel
- Skip, a character from the British children's show Bob the Builder
- Skips, a character on the American animated series Regular Show
- Skips, on Camp Lazlo, an American animated TV series

== Computing ==
- Skip instruction, an instruction that conditionally branches to a predetermine offset from the current instruction based on the results of a test, typically a 3-way compare.

== People ==
- Skip (nickname)
- Ring name of Chris Candido (1972-2005), American professional wrestler

== Storms ==
- Tropical Storm Skip (1982)
- Tropical Storm Skip (1985)

== Other uses ==
- Minecart, also called a skip
- Skip (lawn bowls), the captain of a bowling team
- Skip (container), British English word for large waste container, similar to US dumpster
- Skip (concrete placement), a container in which mixed concrete is carried to the point of pouring
- Skip (curling), the captain of a curling team
- Skip (radio), skywave radio propagation
- Skips (snack)
- Skip (detergent), a detergent brand from Unilever
- "The Skip" (Baddiel's Syndrome), a 2001 television episode
- The Skip, a route run by the Regional Transportation District that runs between North and South Boulder, Colorado
- "Skip" (also "scip"), in-universe slang for contained entities in the SCP Foundation collaborative writing project

== See also ==
- Skep, a type of beehive
- Skip-stop, a public transit service pattern
- Skipper (disambiguation)
- Skipping (disambiguation)
- Skippy (disambiguation)
- Skiptrace, a person being searched for; derived from the idiomatic expression "to skip town"
