= Skeet =

Skeet may refer to:

== Sport ==
- Skeet shooting, a discipline of competitive clay pigeon shooting
  - ISSF Olympic skeet, a variant used at the Olympic Games

== Military ==
- Skeet, a warhead of the BLU-108 submunition
- Curtiss KD2C Skeet, a 1945 American military target drone

== People ==
=== Given name ===
- Skeet Childress (born 1979), American guitar player in the band Look What I Did
- Skeet Quinlan (Volney Ralph Quinlan, 1928–1998), American football player
- Skeet Reese (born 1969), American professional sport fisherman
- Skeet Ulrich (Bryan Ray Trout, born 1970), American actor

=== Surname ===
- Andrew Skeet (born 1969), British musician, composer and music producer
- Brian Skeet (born 1965), English director, writer, producer and cinematographer
- Challen Skeet (1895–1978), English cricketer
- Marcus Skeet (born 2008), English runner
- Trevor Skeet (1918–2004), New Zealand lawyer and British Conservative politician
- William Skeet (1906–1989), New Zealand cricketer

== Other uses ==
- Skeet, slang name for a post and verb for making a post on Bluesky
- Skeet River, in New Zealand's South Island
- Skeet (Newfoundland) a pejorative term in Newfoundland, Canada
- Skeet, a non-standard poker hand
- Skeet (film), a 2024 drama film directed by Nik Sexton

== See also ==
- Skeets (disambiguation)
- Skeeter (disambiguation)
