= Skeets =

Skeets may refer to:

== People ==
- Skeets Gallacher (1925–2013), British boxer
- Richard "Skeets" Gallagher (1891–1955), American actor
- Skeets Herfurt (1911–1992), American jazz saxophonist and clarinetist
- Skeets Martin (1875–1944), American jockey
- Skeets McDonald (1915–1968), American country and rockabilly musician
- William Burke Miller (1904–1983), American newspaper and radio reporter
- Skeets Quinlan (1928–1998), American National Football League player
- Skeets Tolbert (1909–2000), American jazz musician

== Other uses ==
- Skeets (DC Comics), a fictional robot
- Skeets (Sydney Keets), a character in the animated TV series The Little Green Man

== See also ==
- Skeet (disambiguation)
- Skeeter (disambiguation)
