= Pucka =

Pucka can refer to:

- Púca, a creature of Irish folklore
- Alternative spelling of pukka
