= Pucca (disambiguation) =

Pucca may refer to:

- Pucca, a South Korean media franchise with international distribution
  - Pucca (TV series), a Canadian TV show based on the media franchise
- Pucca or pukka, a category of Indian vernacular architecture
  - Pucca housing, residences constructed using that technique
- PuCCa, Turkish writer

== See also ==
- Pukka (disambiguation)
- Pooka (disambiguation)
- Bucca (disambiguation)
- Púca, a mythological creature
