= Skipper =

Skipper or skippers may refer to:

== Rank ==
- Skipper (boating), a person who has command of a vessel
- Skipper (rank), a former warrant rank in the British Royal Naval Reserve
- The leader of a Sea Scouts (Scouting America) troop

== Sports ==
- Another name for a team's manager (baseball), captain (association football), or captain (cricket)
- One who skips using a skipping rope
- Houston Skippers, a minor league ice hockey team based in Houston, Texas, that played in the 1946 season
- Skipper (cannon), the game cannon used by the Virginia Tech Hokies football team

== People ==
- Skipper (surname)
- Skipper Badenhorst (born 1978), South African rugby union player
- Skipper Bowles (1919–1986), American politician and businessman
- Skipper Clement (c. 1484–1536), Danish merchant, captain, privateer and leader of a peasant rebellion
- Francis Gidney (1890–1928), an early leader of the Scouting movement in the United Kingdom
- Thomas Pinckney "Skipper" Heard (1898–1980), longtime athletics director of Louisiana State University
- Skipper Mullins (born c. 1945), American taekwondo 10th degree black belt
- Floyd B. Olson (1891–1936), American politician and lawyer
- Skipper Roberts (baseball) (1888–1963), American Major League Baseball catcher
- Skipper Wise, American singer, songwriter, musician and entrepreneur

== Places ==
- Skippers, Virginia, an unincorporated community
- Skippers Canyon, New Zealand

== Arts and entertainment ==
- The Skipper, a character from the television series Gilligan's Island
- Skipper (Barbie), a doll, Barbie's younger sister
- Skipper (Madagascar), a character in Madagascar and The Penguins of Madagascar
- Kill Cruise (German title: Der Skipper), a 1990 film starring Jürgen Prochnow, Patsy Kensit and Elizabeth Hurley
- Skippers (TV programme), an Irish documentary series
- Skipper Riley, a character in the movie Planes
- "Skipper" (The Bill), 1987 TV episode
- "Skipper" (Red Dwarf), 2017 TV episode

== Animals ==
- Skipper (butterfly), a family of butterflies
- Another name for the European sprat, a fish

== Other uses ==
- AGM-123 Skipper II, a short-range laser-guided missile
- AMT Skipper, a semi-automatic pistol
- USS Skipper, a U.S. Navy minesweeper
- Beechcraft Skipper, a model of aircraft
- Skippers Aviation, a charter airline based in Osborne Park, a suburb of Perth, Australia
- Skippers Seafood & Chowder House, a chain of independently owned and operated restaurants
- Skipper (computer software), a visualization tool and code generator for PHP ORM frameworks
- Skipper, an oil tanker subject to the United States seizure of the oil tanker Skipper

== See also ==
- Skip (disambiguation)
