= Jürgen Knieper =

German composer (born 1941)

- Born: 14 March 1941 (age 85); Karlsruhe, Germany
- Education: State High School of Music
- Occupation: Film score composer
- Awards: German Film Award for Best Music

Jürgen Knieper (born 14 March 1941) is a German film score composer. Born in Karlsruhe, he was educated at Berlin's State High School of Music.

== Career ==
He began working for director Wim Wenders with his 1972 film The Goalkeeper's Fear of the Penalty. For Wenders' 1975 film The Wrong Move, Knieper won the German Film Award for Best Music.

Wenders turned to Knieper again for the music of his 1987 film Wings of Desire. Knieper assumed harps and violins would suffice for a score for a film about angels, until he saw a cut of the film. Seeing the angels were discontent, he wrote a different score employing a choir, voices and whistling. Musicologist Annette Davison argued this score includes elements of Eastern European and Orthodox Christian music.

In 1990, he was nominated for the European Film Award for Best Composer for December Bride.

== Filmography ==
His films include:

- The Goalie's Anxiety at the Penalty Kick (1972)
- The Scarlet Letter (1973)
- The Wrong Move (1975)
- The American Friend (1977)
- Germany, Pale Mother (1980)
- Whitey (1980)
- Christiane F. – We Children from Bahnhof Zoo (1981)
- Room 666 (1984)
- River's Edge (1987)
- Wings of Desire (1987)
- Paint It Black (1989)
- December Bride (1990)
- Lisbon Story (1994)
- Tuvalu (1999)
