= Puka =

Puka may refer to:

== Places ==
- Puka, Estonia, a small borough
  - Puka Parish, a former municipality
- Puka, Lääne-Viru County, Estonia, a village
- Pukë, or Puka, Albania, a town and municipality
- Puka (Peru), a mountain in the Andes

== Plants ==
- Griselinia lucida, an epiphytic plant/tree from New Zealand
- Meryta sinclairii, a threatened tree from New Zealand

== Other uses ==
- Puka shell, a popular form of Hawaiian jewellery
- Puka Nacua (born 2001), American football player
- Puka Temu (born 1954), Papua New Guinean politician
- KF Tërbuni Pukë, an Albanian football club based in Pukë which played under the name Puka in 1949

== See also ==
- Púca, a Celtic, English, and Channel Islands mythological creature
- Pucca (disambiguation)
- Pukka (disambiguation)
- Puka Puka (disambiguation)
- Pūkas, a Lithuanian privately owned commercial broadcasting company
