= Skipper (surname) =

Skipper (or Skippers) is a surname. Notable people with the surname include:

- Dan Skipper (born 1994), American football player
- Elix Skipper (born 1967), American professional wrestler and former professional football player
- George Skipper (1856–1948), English architect
- Harry Skipper (born 1960), Canadian football player
- Howard E. Skipper (1915–2006), American cancer researcher and oncologist
- John Skipper, American television executive, former president of ESPN
- Jim Skipper (born 1949), American football coach
- Katherine Skipper, New Zealand architect
- Kelly Skipper (born 1967), American football coach
- Pat Skipper (born 1958), American actor
- Peter Skipper (1958–2019), English footballer
- Ricardo Skippers (born 1986), South African footballer
- Ryan Skipper (1981–2007), American murder victim
- Spencer Skipper (c. 1848–1903), journalist in South Australia, wrote as "Hugh Kalyptus"
- Susan Skipper (born 1951), British actress
- Svenn Skipper (1947–2021), Danish composer
- Tim Skipper, American vocalist and guitarist in the alternative rock band House of Heroes
- Tim Skipper (American football) (born 1978), American football player and coach
- Tuzar Skipper (born 1995), American football player
- Wayde Skipper (born 1983), Australian rules footballer

== See also ==
- Ricardo Skippers (born 1986), South African footballer
