= Gonzo =

Gonzo may refer to:

== People ==
- Gonzo (nickname), a list of people with the nickname
- Radislav Jovanov Gonzo (born 1964), Croatian music video director Radislav Jovanov, also known as Gonzo
- Matthias Röhr (born 1962), German musician whose stage name is Gonzo
- Gonzo Greg (born 1965), American radio host

== Arts and entertainment ==
=== Characters ===
- Gonzo (Muppet), a Muppet character
- Gonzo Gates, fictional doctor on the television series Trapper John, M.D.
- Gonzo (Breaking Bad), on the television series Breaking Bad

=== Music ===
- Gonzo (album), the fifth studio album by Foxy Shazam
- "Gonzo", a song by the All-American Rejects on their fourth album, Kids in the Street
- "Gonzo", a song by James Booker
- "Gonzo", a song by Ted Nugent on the album Double Live Gonzo!
- "Gonzo", a breakbeat Dance track by Lost and featured on the compilation album Paul Oakenfold Presents 25 Years of Perfecto Records

=== Other ===
- Gonzo: The Life and Work of Dr. Hunter S. Thompson, a 2008 documentary
- Gonzo (show), a television show with Alexa Chung
- Gonzo (magazine), a Belgian Dutch bi-monthly music magazine first published in 1991
- The Gonzo, the Georgetown University student magazine

== Other uses ==
- Gonzo Station, a U.S. Navy acronym for "Gulf of Oman Naval Zone of Operations"
- Gonzo (company), Japanese animation studio
- Gonzo, a configuration of the Bombardier Dash 8 aircraft

== See also ==
- Dr. Gonzo (disambiguation)
- Gonzo journalism, a style of journalism written without claims of objectivity, often including the reporter as part of the story
- Gonzo pornography, a style of pornography
- Gonzoe (1975/1976–2021), American rapper
