= Skippy =

Skippy may refer to:

== People ==
- Skippy (nickname), a list of people

== Arts and entertainment ==
- Skippy (comic strip), an American strip published from 1923 to 1945.
  - Skippy (film), based on the comics strip, released in 1931 and starring Jackie Cooper
  - Skippy (radio series), a 1930s children's radio show based on the comic strip
- Skippy (dog), who portrayed Asta in The Thin Man film series (name changed to Asta after the first movie)
- Irwin "Skippy" Handelman, a recurring character on the American TV series Family Ties
- Skippy, a character and a segment title in Sunday Lovers, a 1980 anthology film
- The title character of Skippy the Bush Kangaroo, a live-action Australian television series
- Skippy: Adventures in Bushtown, animated television series
- Skippy, one of the Fun Girls, recurring characters on the American TV series The Andy Griffith Show
- Daniel "Skippy" Juster, the title character of Skippy Dies, a 2010 tragicomic novel by Paul Murray
- Skippy Squirrel, a character from Animaniacs
- Skippy, a rabbit in Disney's Robin Hood.
- "Skippy" (two versions), on the album Thelonious Monk Blue Note Sessions

== Other uses ==
- Skippy (peanut butter), an American brand
- Skippy (X), in computers a window management tool for X11
- Common name for Pseudocaranx georgianus, a fish found in Australia
- One of the nicknames given to the holotype specimen of Scipionyx

== See also ==
- Standard Commands for Programmable Instruments, often pronounced "skippy"
- Skip (disambiguation)
