= Skipping =

Skipping may refer to:

- Skipping (gait), a rhythmic form of locomotion combining stepping and hopping
- A game or form of exercise using a skipping rope
- Exon skipping, in molecular biology
- Stone skipping, throwing a stone so that it bounces off the surface of water
- String skipping, a guitar-playing technique
- Snowmobile skipping, a sport where drivers hydroplane snowmobiles on lakes or rivers
- British slang for dumpster diving
- an episode of the television series Teletubbies
- a song by the band Associates from their 1982 album Sulk
- Truancy

== See also ==
- Skip (disambiguation)
- Oswald Skippings (born 1953), former Chief Minister of the Turks and Caicos Islands
