= Dr. Gonzo =

Dr. Gonzo may refer to:

- Oscar Zeta Acosta, pseudonym from Hunter S. Thompson's Fear and Loathing in Las Vegas
- John Means (comedian), stand-up comic who used it as a stage name
- Derwyddon Dr Gonzo, a Welsh language band
- Dr Gonzo (album), a 2011 album by Crookers

== See also ==
- Gonzo (disambiguation)
