= Puka Puka =

Puka Puka may refer to:

- Puka Puka (Chumbivilcas), a mountain in the Chumbivilcas Province, Cusco Region, Peru
- Puka Puka (Cochabamba), a mountain in the Cochabamba Department, Bolivia
- Puka Puka (La Paz), a mountain in the La Paz Department, Bolivia
- Puka Puka (Lima), a mountain in the Lima Region, Peru
- Pukapuka, a coral atoll in the northern Cook Islands in Polynesia
- Puka-Puka, a small coral atoll on the north side of the Tuamotus in French Polynesia

== See also ==
- Puka (disambiguation)
