= Skippy (nickname) =

Skippy is the nickname of the following people:

- Skippy Baxter (1919–2012), American figure skater
- Skippy Blair (born 1924), American dance instructor
- David Browning (1931–1956), American diver and 1952 Olympic champion
- Milt Byrnes (1916–1979), American Major League Baseball player
- Skippy Hamahona (born 1975), New Zealand former field hockey player
- Geoff Huegill (born 1979), Australian swimmer
- Scott "Skippy" Jessop (born 1977), American internet personality
- Gregory Messam (born 1973), Jamaican football defender
- Pat Morley (footballer) (born 1965), Irish former footballer
- David Parsons (racing driver) (born 1959), Australian retired racing driver
- Pierre Poilievre (born 1979), Canadian politician
- Skippy Roberge (1917–1993), American Major League Baseball player
- William "Skippy" Rohan (1871–1916), American gangster
- Skippy Smith (1913–2003) American stunt skydiver, and entrepreneur
- Skippy Whitaker (1930–1990), American collegiate basketball player
- Skippy Williams (1916–1994), American jazz saxophonist

== See also ==
- Skippy (disambiguation)
- Skip (nickname)
