= Ricardo Skippers =

South African soccer player

Personal information
- Full name: Ricardo Skippers
- Date of birth: 13 June 1986 (age 40)
- Place of birth: Cape Town, South Africa
- Height: 1.80 m (5 ft 11 in)
- Positions: Left winger; left-back

Team information
- Current team: Engen Santos
- Number: 3

Youth career
- Avendale Athletico

Senior career*
Years	Team	Apps	(Gls)
2005–	Engen Santos	?	(?)
2008–2009	→Vasco Da Gama (loan)	?	(?)
- * Club domestic league appearances and goals as of 1 September 2009 ‡ National team caps and goals as of 1 September 2009

Ricardo Skippers (born 13 June 1986 in Cape Town, Western Cape) is a South African football (soccer) midfielder and defender for Premier Soccer League club Engen Santos.
