= Bucko =

Bucko may refer to:

- Bucko (comics), a webcomic by Jeff Parker and Erika Moen
- Bucko Lake Mine, a nickel mine near Wabowden, Manitoba, Canada

== People ==
- Bucko Kilroy (1921–2007), football player and executive
- Ema Burgić Bucko (born 1992), Bosnian tennis player
- Ivan Bucko (1891–1974), Ukrainian Greek Catholic archbishop
- Karol Bučko, former Slovak football coach
- Michal Piter-Bučko (born 1985), Slovak footballer
- Raymond A. Bucko, Jesuit priest and anthropologist
- Wilfred McDonald (known as Bucko; 1911–1991), Canadian professional hockey and lacrosse player, coach, and politician
- Wes Trainor (known as Bucko; 1922–1991), ice hockey player

== Fictional characters ==
- Bucko (Ninjago), a character in Ninjago

== See also ==
- Bucco (disambiguation)
- Buck (disambiguation)
- Buckow, a town in Märkisch-Oderland, Brandenburg, Germany
