= Pooka (disambiguation) =

Pooka or Púca is a faery creature of Celtic folklore.

Pooka may also refer to

- Pooka (band), British pop duo
- Pooka!, a 2018 film
- Pooka, a race of rabbit-like beings in Odin Sphere
- Pooka, an enemy in Dig Dug
- Pooka, a fictional dog in Anastasia
- Pooka, a kith in Changeling: The Dreaming
- Pooka Williams Jr., American football player
- an invisible rabbit in the
  - 1944 play Harvey by Mary Chase
  - 1950 movie Harvey based on the play
