= Pete (nickname) =

Pete is a nickname of:

- Russell "Pete" Ashbaugh (1921–2009), American football player
- Pedro Pete Astudillo (born 1963), Mexican American songwriter
- Darrel Pete Brewster (1930–2020), American former National Football League player and coach
- Wilson Pete Burness (1904–1969), American animator and animation director, two-time Academy Award winner
- Clarence Pete Carpenter (1914–1987), American jazz trombonist, musical arranger and composer for television shows
- Charles "Pete" Conrad (1930–1999), American naval aviator and astronaut
- Richard Pete Cooper (golfer) (1914–1993), American PGA golfer
- Ulise Joseph Pete Desjardins (1907–1985), American diver, double gold medalist at the 1928 Olympics
- Pietro Pete Domenici (1932–2017), American politician and six-term senator from New Mexico
- Pierre S. du Pont IV (1935–2021), American lawyer, politician and former Governor of Delaware
- Dee Pete Hart (American football) (born 1933), American football player
- Wilbur Pete Henry (1897–1952), American National Football League player and coach
- William J. Knight (1929–2004), American aeronautical engineer, politician, Vietnam War combat pilot, test pilot and astronaut
- Ralph Pierre Pete LaCock, Jr. (born 1952), American former Major League Baseball player
- Warren "Pete" Moore (1938–2017), American singer-songwriter, original bass singer for Motown group The Miracles and record producer
- George Pete Morrison (1890–1973), American silent western film actor
- Linton Pete Muldoon (1887–1929), Canadian hockey coach, first coach of the Chicago Black Hawks
- Peter "Pete" Noyes, American newscaster and reporter
- Charles Pete Orr (racing driver) (1956–2002), American stock car racing driver
- Harding William Pete Peterson (baseball) (1929–2019), American retired Major League Baseball player and general manager
- Pete Rademacher (1928–2021) – American heavyweight boxer, 1956 Olympic gold medalist and world title challenger
- Harold Patrick Pete Reiser (1919–1981), American Major League Baseball player
- Alvin Pete Rozelle (1926–1996), longtime commissioner of the National Football League
- James Pete Runnels (1928–1991), American Major League Baseball player
- Petros Pete Sampras (born 1971), American retired tennis player
- Kenneth Pete Shaw (American football) (born 1954), American former National Football League player
- Alonzo Pete Tillman (1922–1998), American football player and coach
- Pete Wentz (born 1979), American musician and lyricist
- Pete Yorn (born 1974), American musician

== See also ==
- Henry Ole Pete Peterson, American folk legend
