= Senator Bucco =

Senator Bucco may refer to:

- Anthony R. Bucco (1938–2019), New Jersey State Senate
- Anthony M. Bucco (born 1962), New Jersey State Senate
