= Skeeter =

Skeeter may refer to:

- North American slang for mosquito, an insect

== Arts and entertainment ==
=== Fictional characters ===
- Skeeter (Marvel comics), a nickname for Titania
- Skeeter (DC Comics), a vampire from DC Comics
- Skeeter (Muppet), in Muppet Babies
- Skeeter (South Park), in South Park
- one of the title characters of Muggs and Skeeter, an American daily comic strip (1927–1974)
- Skeeter, a recurring Saturday Night Live character
- Skeeter, nickname of Naomi Oates Harper, in Mama's Family
- Skeeter, in Cousin Skeeter
- Skeeter the Paperboy, on-screen persona of Australian TV host James Kemsley
- Skeeter Bronson, in the movie Bedtime Stories
- Skeeter Valentine, in Doug
- Eugenia "Skeeter" Phelan, in the novel and film The Help
- Rita Skeeter, in the Harry Potter series

=== Film ===
- Skeeter (film), a 1993 horror film

== People ==
=== Music ===
- Skeeter Best (1914–1985), American jazz guitarist
- Skeeter Brandon (1948–2008), American blues musician
- Skeeter Bonn (1923–1994), American singer and guitarist
- Skeeter Davis (1931–2004), American singer
- Skeeter Thompson, American punk bassist
- Yung Skeeter, American DJ and recording artist Trevor McFedries (born 1985)

=== Sports ===
- Skeeter Barnes (born 1957), American Major League Baseball player
- Carson Bigbee (1895–1964), American Major League Baseball player
- Kevin Coghlan (footballer) (1929-2002), Australian rules footballer
- Fred Fleiter (1897–1973), Australian rules footballer
- Skeeter Henry (born 1967), American professional basketball player
- Summerfield Johnston III (1954–2007), American businessman and polo player
- Skeeter Kell (1929–2015), American Major League Baseball player
- Skeeter Newsome (1910–1989), American Major League Baseball player
- Skeeter Scalzi (1913–1984), American professional baseball player
- Skeeter Shelton (1888–1954), American collegiate baseball player
- Skeeter Swift (1946–2017), American professional basketball player
- Skeeter Werner Walker (1933–2001), American alpine skier
- Skeeter Webb (1909–1986), American Major League Baseball player
- Clyde Wright (born 1941), American Major League Baseball player

=== Other fields ===
- Skeeter Reece, (1950/1951–), American clown
- Skeeter Skelton (1928–1988), American lawman and writer
- Skeeter Thurston, an American-Canadian rodeo cowboy

== Sports teams ==
- Jersey City Skeeters (1885–1933), an American minor league baseball team
- Newark Skeeters, an American 1920s soccer club
- Rochester Skeeters (1998–2001), an American basketball club
- Sugar Land Skeeters (2012-2021), an American baseball team
- River Vale Skeeters (1939-1942), An American Hockey Club in the EAHL

== Aircraft ==
- Composite Engineering BQM-167 Skeeter, an aerial target drone
- Curtiss-Robertson CR-1 Skeeter, an American 1930s light sports aircraft
- Fisher FP-505 Skeeter, a Canadian kit aircraft
- Saunders-Roe Skeeter, a 1950s–1960s British light helicopter
- Sheffield Skeeter X-1, an American homebuilt aircraft

== See also ==
- Skeets (disambiguation)
- Skeet (disambiguation)
