= Mikko Pukka =

Finnish ice hockey player

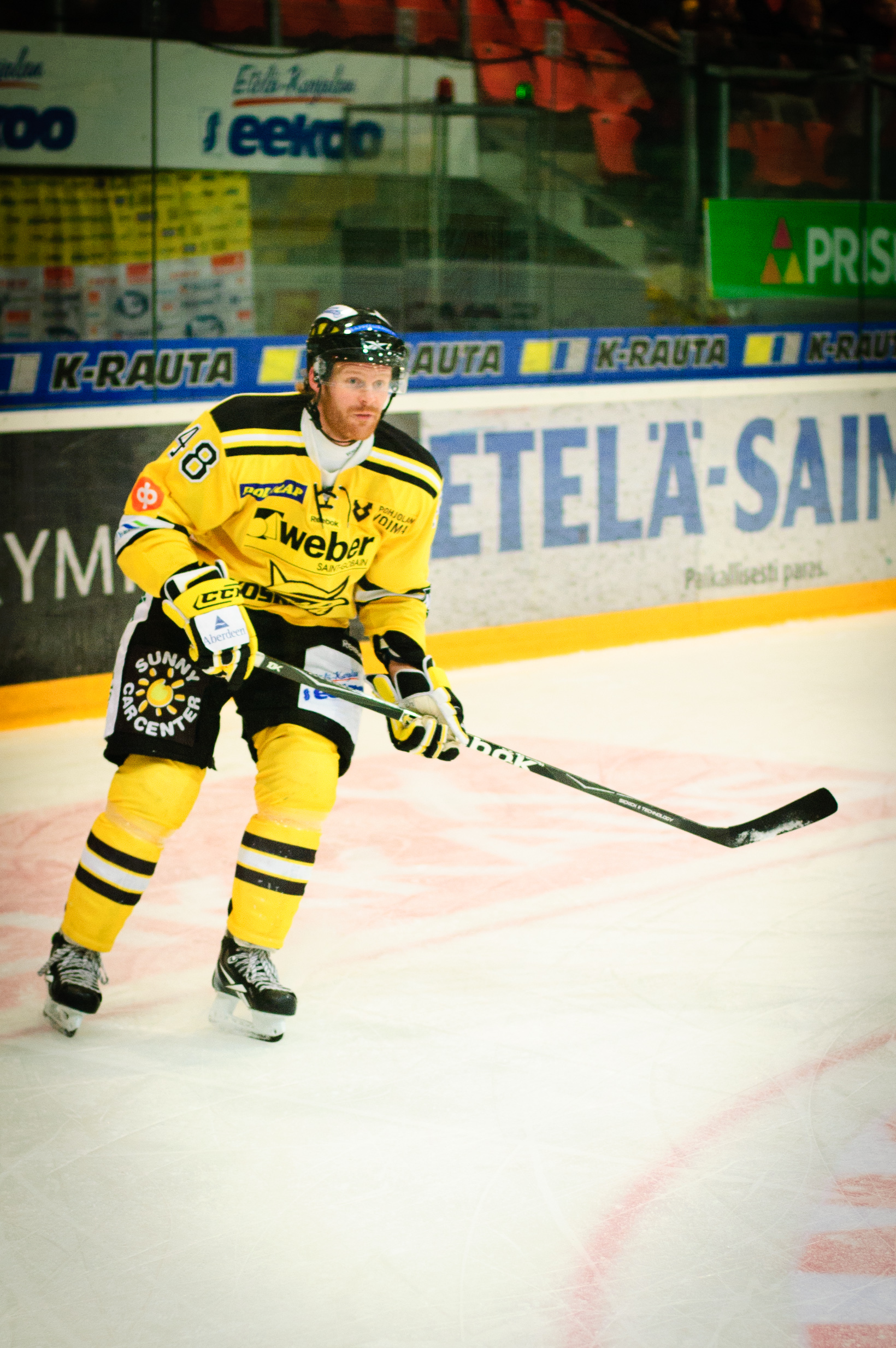
- Born: September 6, 1982 (age 42); Suodenniemi, FIN
- Height: 6 ft 1 in (185 cm)
- Weight: 207 lb (94 kg; 14 st 11 lb)
- Position: Defence
- Shot: Left
- Played for: Tappara; Kokkolan Hermes; KooKoo; Kiekko-Vantaa; FPS; TPS; Luleå HF; Gazovik Tyumen; LeKi; SaiPa; Beibarys Atyrau; Sport; IF Björklöven; KOOVEE; Ilves; HK Dukla Michalovce; DVTK Jegesmedvék
- Playing career: 2000–2021

Mikko Pukka (born September 6, 1982) is a Finnish ice hockey defenceman who currently plays professionally for KOOVEE of Mestis. He previously played in SM-liiga/Liiga for Tappara, TPS, SaiPa and Sport, as well as in Elitserien for Luleå HF.

== Career statistics ==
			Regular season					Playoffs
Season	Team	League	GP	G	A	Pts	PIM	GP	G	A	Pts	PIM
1996–97	Tappara U16	U16 SM-sarja	14	0	6	6	2	4	0	0	0	2
1997–98	Tappara U16	U16 SM-sarja	22	6	7	13	26	6	1	0	1	6
1998–99	Tappara U18	U18 SM-sarja	36	7	16	23	44	—	—	—	—	—
1999–00	Tappara U18	U18 SM-sarja	5	0	2	2	6	—	—	—	—	—
1999–00	Tappara U20	U20 SM-liiga	39	2	7	9	46	10	0	3	3	6
2000–01	Tappara U20	U20 SM-liiga	38	5	11	16	50	6	0	3	3	4
2000–01	Tappara	SM-liiga	19	0	0	0	2	6	0	0	0	2
2001–02	Tappara U20	U20 SM-liiga	14	3	6	9	26	—	—	—	—	—
2001–02	Tappara	SM-liiga	13	0	0	0	8	—	—	—	—	—
2001–02	Kokkolan Hermes	Mestis	19	8	7	15	37	—	—	—	—	—
2002–03	Tappara	SM-liiga	8	0	1	1	4	—	—	—	—	—
2002–03	KooKoo	Mestis	38	12	17	29	34	9	2	2	4	4
2003–04	Tappara	SM-liiga	37	4	2	6	38	—	—	—	—	—
2003–04	Kiekko-Vantaa	Mestis	8	1	3	4	24	—	—	—	—	—
2004–05	Tappara	SM-liiga	46	0	2	2	26	8	0	0	0	4
2004–05	FPS	Mestis	2	0	0	0	4	—	—	—	—	—
2004–05	Kiekko-Vantaa	Mestis	4	0	0	0	0	—	—	—	—	—
2005–06	Tappara	SM-liiga	56	1	3	4	34	6	0	0	0	8
2006–07	Tappara	SM-liiga	1	0	0	0	0	—	—	—	—	—
2006–07	HC TPS	SM-liiga	18	0	1	1	30	—	—	—	—	—
2006–07	Luleå HF	Elitserien	32	0	2	2	46	4	0	0	0	2
2007–08	Luleå HF	Elitserien	48	1	0	1	42	—	—	—	—	—
2008–09	Gazovik Tyumen	Russia2	10	2	0	2	20	—	—	—	—	—
2008–09	Gazovik Tyumen-2	Russia3	6	0	1	1	6	—	—	—	—	—
2008–09	LeKi	Mestis	9	0	2	2	24	—	—	—	—	—
2008–09	SaiPa	SM-liiga	19	0	3	3	22	—	—	—	—	—
2009–10	SaiPa	SM-liiga	52	2	7	9	34	—	—	—	—	—
2010–11	SaiPa	SM-liiga	60	3	5	8	24	—	—	—	—	—
2011–12	SaiPa	SM-liiga	55	1	14	15	68	—	—	—	—	—
2012–13	SaiPa	SM-liiga	41	0	4	4	26	3	0	0	0	0
2013–14	Beibarys Atyrau	Kazakhstan	34	4	8	12	32	—	—	—	—	—
2013–14	SaiPa	Liiga	20	1	2	3	6	3	0	0	0	0
2014–15	Vaasan Sport	Liiga	60	4	4	8	50	—	—	—	—	—
2015–16	Vaasan Sport	Liiga	58	5	8	13	26	2	0	0	0	0
2016–17	Vaasan Sport	Liiga	38	2	3	5	24	—	—	—	—	—
2016–17	IF Björklöven	HockeyAllsvenskan	12	2	4	6	12	—	—	—	—	—
2017–18	IF Björklöven	HockeyAllsvenskan	48	3	9	12	36	—	—	—	—	—
2018–19	IF Björklöven	HockeyAllsvenskan	22	1	3	4	14	—	—	—	—	—
2019–20	KOOVEE	Mestis	29	3	13	16	46	—	—	—	—	—
2019–20	Ilves	Liiga	1	0	2	2	0	—	—	—	—	—
2019–20	Tappara	Liiga	4	1	1	2	8	—	—	—	—	—
2019–20	HK Dukla Michalovce	Slovak	19	4	8	12	12	—	—	—	—	—
2020–21	DVTK Jegesmedvék	Slovak	2	0	0	0	4	—	—	—	—	—
Liiga totals			606	24	62	86	430	28	0	0	0	14
Mestis totals			109	24	42	66	169	9	2	2	4	4
