= Skippers (TV programme) =

Skippers is a reality television programme by Raidió Teilifís Éireann (RTÉ). It follows four Irish fishing trawlers.

== Boats and skippers ==
- Buddy M - C333. Seiner/Pelagic Trawler Skipper:Micheal Meade. Home Port - Crosshaven, Co. Cork
- Tea Rose - S73. Seiner Skipper:Cathal O'Sullivan. Home Port - Castletownbere, Co. Cork
- Ainmire - D536. Vivier Crabber Skipper:Ross Classon. Home Port - Portnoo, Co. Donegal / Ullapool, Scotland
- John B - DA39. Twin-Rig Prawn Trawler Skipper David Price. Home Port - Howth, Co. Dublin

== The skippers ==
Michael Meade: 60 miles off the south coast of Cork is skipper Michael Meade. He's been fishing for the past 25 years and has owned his trawler, the Buddy M, for the past ten years. Alongside Michael are four regular crew members, including Brendan from Cork and Sergey from Warsaw. Michael has seen the fishing industry slowly being eroded and is not hopeful for the future. He fishes out from the small port of Crosshaven in Cork.

Cathal O'Sullivan: The old fishing village of Castletownbere in Co. Cork is where the ambitious and determined Cathal O'Sullivan is based. Cathal has no background in fishing and originally comes from Kenmare in Kerry. He started fishing at 16 and now, at 24, is one of Ireland's youngest skippers in charge of the 80-foot trawler, the Tea Rose. Paddy O'Sullivan owns this €1 million boat and has recently put his faith in Cathal to go it alone.

Cathal leaves behind a young family, and his son gets upset each time he leaves. However, Cathal's duration at sea is getting longer due to the rising price of fuel and the decrease in the value of his catch. He often does three fishing trips in a row, leaving his family for up to 20 days at a time. With every trip comes the pressure of finding a good catch for the crew so that he and his men can earn a decent wage.

Ross Classon: Portnoo in Donegal is home to 42-year-old skipper Ross Classon. He's been fishing since he was 15. However, Ross has no family background in the industry and is the son of a school principal. He went to sea purely because he loved it. This comes with a price to pay as he has less time to spend on shore with his family; when he does come home, it is short before Ross leaves again.

His wife of 25 years, Anna, remembers the strain of raising their sons while Ross was out at sea. Anna has learned to deal with not seeing Ross for weeks at a time; she's learned to cope, but she knows other families who haven't found things so easy. Ross's boat is based in Ullapool, Northern Scotland. He has to make the 430-mile journey by road and sea.

David Price: Howth in North County Dublin is home to the Price fishing family. Youngest son David is carrying on the tradition as an energetic skipper on his father's 60-foot, €2 million trawlers "The John B". David is fishing 80 miles off the east coast of Ireland in search of prawns. Times have changed for David as he has to work twice as hard as he did five years ago when he used to sell his prawns for double what he's getting for them today.

David is frustrated with regulations that need to be clarified. Due to quotas, he has to throw away perfectly good fish. The pressure of costs versus the price he receives for his catch does not add up, and this frustration is sometimes taken out on his crew.

The collapse of the building industry has meant that some Irish are looking at fishing again for work. This trip has brought on board two former construction workers John and Emmet, who both want to make a go of it in the fishing business. For John, it's a significant change from his previous job as a plumber, but he's hoping he won't have to be fishing for too long.

This trip will be make-or-break for the two Irish lads, as David must decide if they are cut out for the hard life at sea.

His training is tough, and they won't get any special treatment.
