= Pukka Electric MiniBike =

The Pukka Electric Mini-bike is a small, battery-powered, two-wheeled electric vehicle formerly manufactured by Pukka USA, LLC. It is capable of carrying a single passenger, weighing a maximum of 220–225 pounds (100–102 kg), to speeds up to 16 miles per hour (26 km/h).

== Components ==
The Pukka is powered by two 12-volt sealed lead–acid batteries contained in a rear compartment, held by the frame behind the seat. It has an electronic motor control board which uses pulse-width modulation, and can provide up to 55 amps when required. It receives low voltage signals from the throttle, which is attached to the right handle bar. The braking system is a drum brake activated through a metal brake cable from a brake handle on the left handle bar. A circuit runs through the brake handle to allow the motor control board to detect when the brake is being used and shut off power to the motor. Thus, the Pukka is designed so that the motor and the brakes cannot be used at the same time.

== Models ==
The Pukka was available in only one model, the GX400C, released in 2002 and quietly discontinued ca. 2007. During its production run it underwent many minor parts changes, including the coulomb valve, kickstand, and internal circuit board or PWM controller. It was sold for approximately $400 through a small, primarily online dealer network. In the midst of significantly declining sales, Pukka USA was acquired by the "blank check" company Sunrise USA in mid-2006. Sales of the GX400C were phased out sometime over the course of the next year.
