= Kid Lowe =

American baseball player

- Third baseman
- Born: July 27, 1900; Mobile, Alabama, U.S.
- Died: November 19, 1988 (aged 88); Memphis, Tennessee, U.S.
- Threw: Right

Negro league baseball debut
- 1921, for the Indianapolis ABCs

Last appearance
- 1931, for the Memphis Red Sox

Teams
- Indianapolis ABCs (1921); Detroit Stars (1922, 1924); Memphis Red Sox (1925–1929); Nashville Elite Giants (1930); Memphis Red Sox (1931)

William McKinley Lowe (July 27, 1900 – November 19, 1988), nicknamed "Kid", was an American Negro league third baseman who played from 1921 to 1931 for the Indianapolis ABCs, Detroit Stars, Memphis Red Sox, and Nashville Elite Giants.

A native of Mobile, Alabama, Lowe coached baseball at Booker T. Washington High School after his playing career had ended. In 1937, he formed his own semi-pro barnstorming team, which featured such notable players as Verdell Mathis.

Lowe died in Memphis, Tennessee in 1988 at age 88.
