= Skip (nickname) =

Skip is a nickname (for example, when a name has skipped a generation), or a short form of the given name Skipper. Notable people with the name include:

== In arts and entertainment ==
- Skip Arnold (born 1957), American contemporary artist
- Skip Battin (1934–2003), American singer-songwriter
- Skip Battaglia (born 1948), American filmmaker
- Skip Blumberg (born 1946), American TV producer
- Skip Bolen (born 1960), American photographer
- Skip Drinkwater, American record producer
- Skip Ewing (born 1964), American country music singer and songwriter
- Henry Louis "Skip" Gates, Jr. (born 1950), American historian and filmmaker
- Skip Groff (1948–2019), American record producer
- Skip Hahn (born 1951), American musician
- Skip Hall (musician) (1909–1980), American musician
- Skip Heitzig (born 1955), American pastor
- Skip Heller (born 1965), American singer-songwriter
- Skip Hinnant (1940–2026), American actor and comedian
- Skip Hollandsworth (born 1957), American author
- Skip Homeier (1930–2017), American actor
- Skip Horack (born 1976), American writer
- Skip James (1902–1969), American singer
- Skip Jensen (born 1967), Canadian singer-songwriter
- Skip Jones, American folk musician
- Skip Kelly (born 1973), American radio personality
- Skip Konte (born 1944), American keyboardist
- Skip Lievsay, American sound editor
- Skip E. Lowe (1929–2014), American actor
- Skip Marley (born 1996), Jamaican singer-songwriter
- Skip Martin (1916–1976), American saxophonist
- Skip Mercier (1954–2021), American costume designer
- Skip Miller (1946–2009), American record executive
- Skip O'Brien (1950–2011), American actor
- Skip Palenik (born 1946), American author
- Skip Prokop (1943–2017), Canadian drummer
- Skip Scarborough (1944–2003), American songwriter
- Skip Sempé (born 1958), American harpsichordist
- Skip Spence (1946–1999), American-Canadian singer
- Skip Stellrecht (born 1959), American actor
- Skip Stephenson (1940–1992), American actor
- Skip Weshner (1927–1995), American disc jockey
- Skip Williams, American game designer
- Skip Williamson (1944–2017), American cartoonist
- Skip Williamson (producer) (born 1964), American producer
- Skip Woods (born 1970), American screenwriter

== In sports ==
- Skip Alexander (1918–1997), American golfer
- Skip Bandini, American football player
- Skip Barber (born 1936), American retired race car driver
- Skip Bayless (born 1951), American sports columnist and TV personality
- Skip Bertman (born 1938), American former college baseball coach and athletic director at Louisiana State University
- Skip Brown (born 1955), American basketball player
- Skip Butler (born 1947), American former National Football League placekicker
- Skip Caray (1939–2008), American sportscaster, son of Harry Caray
- Skip Chappelle, American basketball player
- Skip Cutting (born 1946), American cyclist
- Skip Engblom (born 1948), American skateboarder
- Skip Frye (born 1941), American surfer
- Skip Gilbert (born 1960), American soccer player
- Skip Gougler (1894–1962), American football player
- Skip Guinn (born 1944), American baseball player
- Skip Hall (American football) (born 1944), American football coach
- Skip Hall (martial artist) (born 1948), American mixed martial artist
- Skip Harlicka (born 1946), American basketball player
- Skip Henderson (born 1965), American basketball player
- Skip Hicks (born 1974), American retired National Football League running back
- Skip Holtz (born 1964), head football coach at Louisiana Tech University and former head coach of the University of South Florida
- Skip James (baseball) (born 1949), American professional baseball player
- Skip Johnson (born 1967), American baseball player
- Skip Jutze (born 1946), American former Major League Baseball catcher
- Skip Kendall (born 1964), American golfer
- Skip Kenney (1943–2022), American head coach
- Skip Krake (born 1943), Canadian former National Hockey League player
- Skip Lane (born 1960), American football player
- Skip Lockwood (born 1946), American retired Major League Baseball pitcher
- Skip Manning (born 1945), American former NASCAR driver
- Skip McClendon (born 1964), American football player
- Skip Mills (born 1985), American basketball player
- Skip Minisi (1926–2005), American college and National Football League halfback, member of the College Football Hall of Fame
- Skip Peete (born 1963), American college football player and college and National Football League coach
- Skip Phoenix (born 1948), Canadian driver
- Skip Pitlock (born 1947), American former Major League Baseball pitcher
- Skip Prosser (1950–2007), American college basketball coach
- Skip Roderick (born 1966), American soccer player
- Skip Schumaker (born 1980), American Major League Baseball player
- Skip Seagraves (born 1982), American football player
- Skip Stahley (1908–1992), American college football coach and athletic director
- Skip Stanowski (born 1944), Canadian ice hockey player
- Skip Storch (born 1957), American swimmer
- Skip Sweetser (1936–2020), American rower
- Skip Teal (1933–2006), Canadian professional ice hockey centre
- Skip Thomas (1950–2011), American former National Football League cornerback
- Skip Thoren (born 1943), American basketball player
- Skip Vanderbundt (born 1946), American football player
- Skip Wilson (1929–2022), retired college baseball head coach
- Skip Wise (born 1955), American basketball player
- Skip Wolters (1929–2003), Singaporean water polo player
- Skip Wymard (1890–1970), American football player
- Skip Young (wrestler) (1951–2010), American professional wrestler

== In politics ==
- Skip Bafalis (1929–2023), American politician
- Skip Berrien, American politician
- Skip Brion (born 1948), American politician
- Skip Campbell (1948–2018), American politician
- Skip Cleaver (1944–2022), American politician
- Skip Daly (born 1959), American politician
- Skip Finn (1948–2018), American politician
- Skip Humphrey (born 1942), American former politician, Minnesota attorney general and state senator
- Skip Priest (born 1950), American politician
- Skip Reilly, American politician
- Skip Rimsza (born 1955), American politician
- Skip Rollins, American politician

== Other ==
- Skip Garibaldi, American mathematician
- Skip Holm (born 1944), American fighter, test and racing pilot
- Skip Prichard, American business executive
- Skip Rutherford (born 1950), American non-profit executive and academic administrator
- Skip Stewart (born 1968), American aerobatic and commercial pilot
- Skip Triplett, Canadian former president of Kwantlen Polytechnic University, Vancouver, British Columbia

== See also ==
- Skippy (nickname)
