= Sad Sam =

Sad Sam is the nickname of:

- Sam Gray (baseball) (1897–1953), American Major League Baseball pitcher
- Sad Sam Jones (1892–1966), American Major League Baseball pitcher
- Sam Thompson (pitcher) (1908–1978), American Negro league pitcher
- Sam Zoldak (1918–1966), American Major League Baseball pitcher
