= Gonzo (nickname) =

As a nickname, Gonzo may refer to:

== People with the González last name ==
- Adrián González (born 1982), American Major League Baseball player
- Alex Gonzalez, American former Major League Baseball player
- Fernando González (born 1980), Chilean tennis player
- Jean-Michel Gonzalez (born 1967), French former rugby union footballer and current coach
- Luis Gonzalez (born 1967), American former Major League Baseball player
- Tony Gonzalez (born 1976), National Football League tight end

== Other ==
- Stewart MacLaren (born 1953), Scottish former footballer
- Georgi Ivanov, Bulgarian former footballer
- Gary Pratt (born 1981), English cricketer and footballer
- Braulio Arellano Domínguez, Mexican drug lord known as "El Gonzo"

== See also ==
- Gonzo (disambiguation)
