= Bucca =

Bucca may refer to:

- Bucca (mythological creature), a mythological creature of Cornish origin
- Bucca (founder of Buckingham), seventh-century Anglo-Saxon founder of Buckingham, England
- Bucca, Queensland, a locality in the Bundaberg Region, Queensland, Australia
- Camp Bucca, a U.S. military prison camp in Iraq
- Cheek, Latin term being bucca

== People with the surname ==
- Dorotea Bucca (1360–1436), Italian noblewoman
- Eduardo Bucca (born 1979), Argentine politician
- Leonel Bucca (born 1999), Argentine footballer
- Ronald Paul Bucca (1954–2001), New York City fire marshal killed during the September 11, 2001, terrorist attacks
- Salvador Bucca (1920–2005), Argentine linguist
