= Whitey =

Whitey may refer to:

== People ==
- Whitey Alperman (1879–1942), MLB player
- Richie Ashburn (1927–1997), MLB player and broadcaster
- James Wellwood "Whitey" Basson (born 1946), South African businessman
- Whitey Bimstein (1897–1969), boxer and boxing trainer
- Whitey Bulger (1929–2018), crime boss of organized crime group in the Boston area in the 1970s and 1980s
- Whitey Ford (1928–2020), Major League Baseball (MLB) pitcher
- Whitey Glazner (1893–1989), MLB pitcher
- Roy Grant (1916–2010), of the American country music duo Whitey and Hogan
- Whitey Harrison (1913–1993), American surfer and surf equipment innovator
- Whitey Herzog (1931–2024), MLB player and manager
- Whitey Krakow (died 1941), New York mobster and hitman for Murder, Inc.
- Whitey Kurowski (1919–1999), MLB player
- Whitey Lockman (1926–2009), MLB player, coach, manager and executive
- Whitey Mitchell (1932–2009), American jazz bassist and television writer and producer
- Whitey Moore (1912–1987), MLB pitcher
- Whitey Von Nieda (1922–2023), National Basketball Association player, basketball coach
- Whitey Platt (1920–1970), MLB player
- Sanger D. Shafer (1934–2019), American country music songwriter and musician
- Myer Skoog (1926–2019), National Basketball Association player
- Whitey Thomas (1895–1978), American football player
- Herbert "Whitey" White, leader of Whitey's Lindy Hoppers, the most notable dance troupe of the Lindy Hop Aerials Era
- Whitey Wietelmann (1919–2002), MLB player and coach
- Whitey Wilshere (1912–1985), MLB pitcher
- Whitey Wistert (1912–1985), American football and baseball player, member of the College Football Hall of Fame
- Whitey Witt (1895–1988), MLB player
- Harry Wolfe (baseball) (1888–1971), MLB player
- Whitey Woodin (1894–1974), American football player
- Whitey (musician), born Nathan Joseph White, British electro-rock musician

== Fictional characters ==
- Aelfyre Whitemane, in the Marvel Comics series Power Pack
- Whitey Durham, on the television series One Tree Hill
- Whitey, from Judge Dredd
- Whitey Duvall, from Eight Crazy Nights

== Other uses ==
- Whitey (drugs), a slang term associated with certain forms of recreational drug use
- Whitey (slang), a derogatory term for white people
- Whitey (band), a Denton, Texas funk band
- Whitey: United States of America v. James J. Bulger, a 2014 documentary film
- Whitey (film), a 1980 Belgian movie
- Whitey's Ice Cream, an ice cream manufacturer and line of ice cream shops in the Midwestern United States
- Whitey, an informal name for the White River Monster

== See also ==
- Whity, a 1971 German film
- Whitey tape incident, a 2008 political dirty trick by Larry C. Johnson
