= Skeet Quinlan =

American football player (1928–1998)

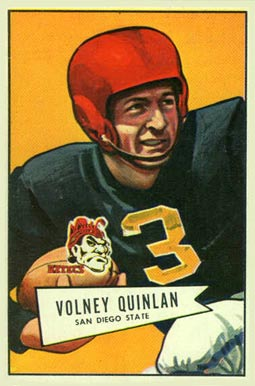
- Quinlan on a 1952 Bowman football card

No. 21, 43
- Position: Halfback

Personal information
- Born: June 22, 1928; San Angelo, Texas, U.S.
- Died: January 18, 1998 (aged 69); Okeechobee, Florida, U.S.
- Listed height: 5 ft 11 in (1.80 m)
- Listed weight: 173 lb (78 kg)

Career information
- High school: Grand Prairie (Grand Prairie, Texas)
- College: TCU (1946); San Diego State (1951)
- NFL draft: 1952: 4th round, 49th overall pick

Career history
- Los Angeles Rams (1952–1956); Cleveland Browns (1956)

Awards and highlights
- Pro Bowl (1954)

Career NFL statistics
- Rushing yards: 1,514
- Rushing average: 5.9
- Receptions: 75
- Receiving yards: 1,181
- Total touchdowns: 16
- Stats at Pro Football Reference

Volney Ralph "Skeet" Quinlan Jr (June 22, 1928 – January 18, 1998) was an American professional football player who was a halfback for five seasons in the National Football League (NFL). He played college football for the TCU Horned Frogs and San Diego State Aztecs. Quinlan played in the NFL for the Los Angeles Rams from 1952 to 1956 and the Cleveland Browns in 1956. He was one of the first star running backs to emerge from Texas.
