= Boston Red Sox all-time roster =

List of baseball players

The following is a list of players, past and present, who have appeared in at least one competitive game for the Boston Red Sox American League franchise (founded in 1908), known previously as the Boston Americans (1901–07).

Players in bold are members of the National Baseball Hall of Fame.

Players in italics have had their numbers retired by the team.

== A ==
- David Aardsma
- Don Aase
- Andy Abad
- Fernando Abad
- Wilyer Abreu
- Alfredo Aceves
- Jerry Adair
- Bob Adams
- Terry Adams
- Doc Adkins
- Benny Agbayani
- Harry Agganis
- Sam Agnew
- Rick Aguilera
- Matt Albers
- Jorge Alcalá
- Izzy Alcántara
- Dale Alexander
- Manny Alexander
- Jorge Alfaro
- Luis Alicea
- Gary Allenson
- Mel Almada
- Abraham Almonte
- Héctor Almonte
- Nick Altrock
- Luis Alvarado
- Abe Alvarez
- Larry Andersen
- Brady Anderson
- Brian Anderson
- Chase Anderson
- Fred Anderson
- Jimmy Anderson
- Lars Anderson
- Ernie Andres
- Kim Andrew
- Ivy Andrews
- Mike Andrews
- Shane Andrews
- Matt Andriese
- Roman Anthony
- **Luis Aparicio**
- Luis Aponte
- Pete Appleton
- Jonathan Araúz
- Frank Arellanes
- Tony Armas
- Charlie Armbruster
- Jonathan Aro
- Rolando Arrojo
- Bronson Arroyo
- Christian Arroyo
- Bob Asbjornson
- Billy Ashley
- Ken Aspromonte
- Pedro Astacio
- Scott Atchison
- James Atkins
- Elden Auker
- Leslie Aulds
- Steve Avery
- Bobby Ávila
- Ramón Avilés
- Mike Avilés
- Joe Azcue

== B ==
- Burke Badenhop
- Lore Bader
- Carlos Baerga
- Jim Bagby
- Andrew Bailey
- Bob Bailey
- Cory Bailey
- Gene Bailey
- Jeff Bailey
- Al Baker
- Floyd Baker
- Jack Baker
- Tracy Baker
- Rocco Baldelli
- Neal Ball
- Scott Bankhead
- Willie Banks
- Walter Barbare
- Frank Barberich
- Daniel Bard
- Josh Bard
- Brian Bark
- Brian Barkley
- Babe Barna
- Matt Barnes
- Steve Barr
- Kyle Barraclough
- Bill Barrett
- Bob Barrett
- Frank Barrett
- Jimmy Barrett
- Marty Barrett
- Tom Barrett
- Ed Barry
- Jack Barry
- Steve Barr
- Aaron Bates
- Frank Baumann
- Jason Bay
- Don Baylor
- Bill Bayne
- Eduard Bazardo
- Pedro Beato
- Rod Beck
- Josh Beckett
- Érik Bédard
- Hugh Bedient
- Jalen Beeks
- Stan Belinda
- Brayan Bello
- Gary Bell
- Juan Bell
- Mark Bellhorn
- Adrián Beltré
- Esteban Beltré
- Andrew Benintendi
- Juan Beníquez
- Mike Benjamin
- Dennis Bennett
- Frank Bennett
- Jake Bennett
- Al Benton
- Todd Benzinger
- Lou Berberet
- Moe Berg
- Boze Berger
- Brennan Bernardino
- Charlie Berry
- Quintin Berry
- Sean Berry
- Damon Berryhill
- Mookie Betts
- Hal Bevan
- Ben Beville
- Jeff Bianchi
- Dante Bichette
- Elliot Bigelow
- Jack Billingham
- Doug Bird
- John Bischoff
- Max Bishop
- Dave Black
- Tim Blackwell
- Richard Bleier
- Clarence Blethen
- Greg Blosser
- Red Bluhm
- Mike Boddicker
- Larry Boerner
- Xander Bogaerts
- **Wade Boggs**
- Bobby Bolin
- Milt Bolling
- Tom Bolton
- Boof Bonser
- Ike Boone
- Ray Boone
- Cam Booser
- Toby Borland
- Tom Borland
- **Lou Boudreau**
- Michael Bowden
- Sam Bowen
- Stew Bowers
- Joe Bowman
- Ted Bowsfield
- Oil Can Boyd
- Blaine Boyer
- Chad Bradford
- Herb Bradley
- Hugh Bradley
- Jackie Bradley Jr.
- Cliff Brady
- King Brady
- Darren Bragg
- Mark Brandenburg
- Bucky Brandon
- Ryan Brasier
- Fred Bratschi
- Alex Bregman
- Brandon Brennan
- Bryce Brentz
- Craig Breslow
- Eddie Bressoud
- Ken Brett
- Colten Brewer
- Tom Brewer
- Austin Brice
- Ralph Brickner
- Jim Brillheart
- Drake Britton
- Dick Brodowski
- Rico Brogna
- Jack Brohamer
- Adrian Brown
- Corey Brown
- Dusty Brown
- Hal Brown
- Jamie Brown
- Kevin Brown
- Lloyd Brown
- Mace Brown
- Mike Brown
- Mike Brumley
- Tom Brunansky
- Jim Bucher
- Clay Buchholz
- Bill Buckner
- Don Buddin
- Walker Buehler
- Damon Buford
- Kirk Bullinger
- Fred Burchell
- Bob Burda
- Nick Burdi
- Tom Burgmeier
- Raymond Burgos
- **Jesse Burkett**
- John Burkett
- Morgan Burkhart
- Ellis Burks
- Rick Burleson
- George Burns
- Mike Burns
- Jim Burton
- Jim Busby
- Bullet Joe Bush
- Jack Bushelman
- Frank Bushey
- Bill Butland
- Dan Butler
- Bud Byerly
- Jim Byrd
- Marlon Byrd
- Paul Byrd

== C ==
- Fernando Cabrera
- Orlando Cabrera
- Hick Cady
- Iván Calderón
- Earl Caldwell
- Ray Caldwell
- Mike Cameron
- Dolph Camilli
- Bill Campbell
- Isaiah Campbell
- Kristian Campbell
- Paul Campbell
- José Canseco
- Chris Capuano
- Bernie Carbo
- Tom Carey
- Walter Carlisle
- Swede Carlstrom
- Cleo Carlyle
- Roy Carlyle
- Chris Carpenter
- Héctor Carrasco
- Bill Carrigan
- Ed Carroll
- Mike Carp
- Chris Carter
- Jerry Casale
- Triston Casas
- Joe Cascarella
- Sean Casey
- Kevin Cash
- Andrew Cashner
- Scott Cassidy
- Carlos Castillo
- Frank Castillo
- Rusney Castillo
- Danny Cater
- Joey Gathright
- Garin Cecchini
- Rex Cecil
- Juan Centeno
- **Orlando Cepeda**
- Rick Cerone
- Yoenis Céspedes
- Chet Chadbourne
- Bob Chakales
- Wes Chamberlain
- Esty Chaney
- Yu Chang
- Ed Chaplin
- Aroldis Chapman
- Ben Chapman
- Pete Charton
- Ken Chase
- Jhoulys Chacin
- Michael Chavis
- Charlie Chech
- Robinson Checo
- Bruce Chen
- Tsung-Che Cheng
- **Jack Chesbro**
- Nelson Chittum
- Jin Ho Cho
- Joe Christopher
- Loyd Christopher
- Joe Cicero
- Eddie Cicotte
- Galen Cisco
- Pedro Ciriaco
- Bill Cissell
- Danny Clark
- Jack Clark
- Otey Clark
- Phil Clark
- Tony Clark
- Royce Clayton
- Mark Clear
- Roger Clemens
- Matt Clement
- Lance Clemons
- Reggie Cleveland
- Tex Clevenger
- Lou Clinton
- Bill Clowers
- George Cochran
- Robert Coello
- Jack Coffey
- Alex Cole
- Dave Coleman
- Michael Coleman
- Lou Collier
- **Jimmy Collins**
- Ray Collins
- Rip Collins
- Shano Collins
- Bartolo Colón
- Merl Combs
- Ralph Comstock
- David Cone
- Bunk Congalton
- Billy Conigliaro
- Tony Conigliaro
- Gene Conley
- Willson Contreras
- Bud Connolly
- Ed Connolly (C)
- Ed Connolly (P)
- Joe Connolly
- Bill Conroy
- Billy Consolo
- Aaron Cook
- Ryan Cook
- Dusty Cooke
- Jimmy Cooney
- Cecil Cooper
- Garrett Cooper
- Guy Cooper
- Scott Cooper
- Alex Cora
- Franchy Cordero
- Wil Cordero
- Bryan Corey
- Rhéal Cormier
- Vic Correll
- Jim Corsi
- Marlan Coughtry
- Fritz Coumbe
- Dylan Covey
- Ted Cox
- Allen Craig
- Doc Cramer
- Gavvy Cravath
- Carl Crawford
- Kutter Crawford
- Paxton Crawford
- Steve Crawford
- Pat Creeden
- Bob Cremins
- César Crespo
- Lou Criger
- Coco Crisp
- Cooper Criswell
- Garrett Crochet
- **Joe Cronin**
- Zach Crouch
- Rich Croushore
- José Cruz Jr.
- William Cuevas
- Leon Culberson
- Ray Culp
- Midre Cummings
- George Cuppy
- Steve Curry
- John Curtis
- Milt Cuyler

== D ==
- Babe Dahlgren
- Bobby Dalbec
- Pete Daley
- Dom Dallessandro
- Johnny Damon
- Tyler Danish
- Babe Danzig
- Chase d'Arnaud
- Bobby Darwin
- Danny Darwin
- Brian Daubach
- Bob Daughters
- Austin Davis
- Jaylin Davis
- Rajai Davis
- **Andre Dawson**
- Alejandro De Aza
- Rubby De La Rosa
- José De La Torre
- José De León
- Cot Deal
- Rob Deer
- Pep Deininger
- Iván DeJesús Jr.
- Manny Delcarmen
- Alex Delgado
- Ike Delock
- Don Demeter
- Ryan Dempster
- Brian Denman
- Sam Dente
- Matt Dermody
- Mike Derrick
- Gene Desautels
- Mel Deutsch
- Rafael Devers
- Mickey Devine
- Hal Deviney
- Al DeVormer
- Bo Díaz
- Jonathan Diaz
- Juan Díaz
- George Dickey
- Emerson Dickman
- Bob Didier
- Jake Diekman
- Steve Dillard
- Dom DiMaggio
- Lenny DiNardo
- Bill Dinneen
- Bob DiPietro
- Hunter Dobbins
- Ray Dobens
- Joe Dobson
- Sam Dodge
- Pat Dodson
- **Bobby Doerr**
- John Doherty
- Andy Dominique
- John Donahue
- Pat Donahue
- Brendan Donnelly
- Chris Donnels
- Pete Donohue
- John Dopson
- Tom Doran
- Harry Dorish
- Jim Dorsey
- Félix Doubront
- Patsy Dougherty
- Tommy Dowd
- Jeter Downs
- Danny Doyle
- Denny Doyle
- Dick Drago
- Clem Dreisewerd
- J. D. Drew
- Stephen Drew
- Walt Dropo
- Jean Dubuc
- Frank Duffy
- Joe Dugan
- Bob Duliba
- George Dumont
- Jarren Duran
- Caleb Durbin
- Ed Durham
- Cedric Durst
- Adam Duvall
- Jim Dwyer

== E ==
- Arnold Earley
- Connelly Early
- Mike Easler
- Nate Eaton
- **Dennis Eckersley**
- Elmer Eggert
- Howard Ehmke
- Hack Eibel
- Roenis Elias
- Jacoby Ellsbury
- Dick Ellsworth
- Steve Ellsworth
- Alan Embree
- Clyde Engle
- Nathan Eovaldi
- Todd Erdos
- Nick Esasky
- Edwin Escobar
- Vaughn Eshelman
- Raynel Espinal
- Al Evans
- Bill Evans
- Dwight Evans
- Carl Everett
- Hoot Evers
- Homer Ezzell

== F ==
- Jeurys Familia
- Carmen Fanzone
- Jake Faria
- Steve Farr
- Doc Farrell
- Duke Farrell
- Jeff Fassero
- Michael Feliz
- Alex Ferguson
- **Rick Ferrell**
- Wes Ferrell
- Hobe Ferris
- Dave Ferriss
- Chick Fewster
- Joel Finch
- Tommy Fine
- Lou Finney
- Gar Finnvold
- Mike Fiore
- Hank Fischer
- **Carlton Fisk**
- Doug Fister
- Richard Fitts
- Howie Fitzgerald
- Ira Flagstead
- John Flaherty
- Al Flair
- Bill Fleming
- Scott Fletcher
- Bryce Florie
- Ben Flowers
- Cliff Floyd
- Chad Fonville
- Frank Foreman
- Happy Foreman
- Mike Fornieles
- Gary Fortune
- Tony Fossas
- Casey Fossum
- Eddie Foster
- Rube Foster
- Bob Fothergill
- Keith Foulke
- Boob Fowler
- Chad Fox
- Matt Fox
- Pete Fox
- **Jimmie Foxx**
- Joe Foy
- Ray Francis
- Buck Freeman
- Hersh Freeman
- John Freeman
- Charlie French
- Bernie Friberg
- Owen Friend
- Todd Frohwirth
- Jeff Frye
- Oscar Fuhr
- Frank Fuller
- Curt Fullerton
- Michael Fulmer

== G ==
- Kason Gabbard
- Gary Gaetti
- Fabian Gaffke
- Phil Gagliano
- Éric Gagné
- Del Gainer
- Rich Gale
- Denny Galehouse
- Ed Gallagher
- Bob Gallagher
- Jim Galvin
- Alec Gamboa
- Bob Garbark
- Rich Garcés
- Jhostynxon Garcia
- Luis García
- Nomar Garciaparra
- Mike Gardiner
- Billy Gardner
- Larry Gardner
- Wes Gardner
- Mike Garman
- Cliff Garrison
- Ford Garrison
- Justin Garza
- Mickey Gasper
- Alex Gaston
- Milt Gaston
- Joey Gathright
- Rich Gedman
- Gary Geiger
- Charlie Gelbert
- Wally Gerber
- Frank German
- Justin Germano
- Dick Gernert
- Doc Gessler
- Chappie Geygan
- Jeremy Giambi
- Joe Giannini
- Norwood Gibson
- Russ Gibson
- Andy Gilbert
- Don Gile
- Frank Gilhooley
- Bernard Gilkey
- Bob Gillespie
- Grant Gillis
- Joe Ginsberg
- Lucas Giolito
- Ralph Glaze
- Harry Gleason
- Joe Glenn
- John Godwin
- Zack Godley
- Chuck Goggin
- Jonny Gomes
- Wayne Gomes
- Mauro Gómez
- Stephen Gonsalves
- Joe Gonzales
- Adrián González
- Álex González
- Enrique González
- Eusebio González
- Geremi González
- Marwin González
- Romy González
- Johnny Gooch
- Billy Goodman
- Tom Gordon
- Jim Gosger
- Tony Graffanino
- Charlie Graham
- Lee Graham
- Skinny Graham
- Dave Gray
- Jeff Gray
- Craig Grebeck
- Lenny Green
- Nick Green
- Pumpsie Green
- Mike Greenwell
- Vean Gregg
- Doug Griffin
- Marty Griffin
- Guido Grilli
- Ray Grimes
- Myron Grimshaw
- Marv Grissom
- Vaughn Grissom
- Kip Gross
- Turkey Gross
- **Lefty Grove**
- Deivy Grullón
- Ken Grundt
- Creighton Gubanich
- Mike Guerra
- Luis Guerrero
- Mario Guerrero
- Tyron Guerrero
- Bobby Guindon
- Randy Gumpert
- Eric Gunderson
- Hy Gunning
- Mark Guthrie
- Jackie Gutiérrez
- Ricky Gutiérrez
- Don Gutteridge

== H ==
- Casey Hageman
- John Halama
- Odell Hale
- Justin Haley
- Raymond Haley
- Bill Hall
- Charley Hall
- Matt Hall
- Caleb Hamilton
- David Hamilton
- Chris Hammond
- Garry Hancock
- Josh Hancock
- Chris Haney
- Fred Haney
- Ryan Hanigan
- Joel Hanrahan
- Devern Hansack
- Craig Hansen
- Erik Hanson
- Carroll Hardy
- Tim Harikkala
- Harry Harper
- Tommy Harper
- Billy Harrell
- Ken Harrelson
- Bill Harris
- Greg Harris
- Joe Harris (1B)
- Joe Harris (P)
- Mickey Harris
- Reggie Harris
- Willie Harris
- Kyle Harrison
- Slim Harriss
- Jack Harshman
- Kyle Hart
- Chuck Hartenstein
- Grover Hartley
- Mike Hartley
- Charlie Hartman
- Chad Harville
- Bill Haselman
- Herb Hash
- Alex Hassan
- Andy Hassler
- Billy Hatcher
- Fred Hatfield
- Scott Hatteberg
- Grady Hatton
- Clem Hausmann
- Jack Hayden
- Frankie Hayes
- Ed Hearne
- Danny Heep
- Bob Heffner
- Randy Heflin
- Fred Heimach
- Tyler Heineman
- Bob Heise
- Tommy Helms
- Heath Hembree
- Charlie Hemphill
- Dave Henderson
- **Rickey Henderson**
- Liam Hendriks
- Tim Hendryx
- Olaf Henriksen
- Bill Henry
- Butch Henry
- Jim Henry
- Dustin Hermanson
- Jeremy Hermida
- Darwinzon Hernández
- Kiké Hernández
- Marco Hernández
- Gorkys Hernández
- Ramón Hernández
- Jonathan Herrera
- Mike Herrera
- Tom Herrin
- Joe Hesketh
- Eric Hetzel
- Joe Heving
- Johnnie Heving
- Charlie Hickman
- Jordan Hicks
- Pinky Higgins
- Aaron Hill
- Rich Hill
- Shea Hillenbrand
- Hob Hiller
- Dave Hillman
- Gordie Hinkle
- Dalier Hinojosa
- Paul Hinrichs
- Eric Hinske
- Paul Hinson
- Harley Hisner
- Billy Hitchcock
- Dick Hoblitzel
- Butch Hobson
- George Hockette
- Johnny Hodapp
- Mel Hoderlein
- Billy Hoeft
- Jack Hoey
- Glenn Hoffman
- Fred Hofmann
- Bryan Holaday
- Ken Holcombe
- Dave Hollins
- Billy Holm
- Brock Holt
- Mike Holtz
- **Harry Hooper**
- Bailey Horn
- Sam Horn
- Tony Horton
- Dwayne Hosey
- Eric Hosmer
- Tommy Hottovy
- Tanner Houck
- Tom House
- Wayne Housie
- Chris Howard
- Elston Howard
- Paul Howard
- Les Howe
- Bob Howry
- Peter Hoy
- **Waite Hoyt**
- Ken Huckaby
- Joe Hudson
- Sid Hudson
- Ed Hughes
- Long Tom Hughes
- Terry Hughes
- Tex Hughson
- Byron Humphrey
- Ben Hunt
- Buddy Hunter
- Herb Hunter
- Tom Hurd
- Bruce Hurst
- Butch Huskey
- Bert Husting
- Adam Hyzdu

== I ==
- José Iglesias
- Daryl Irvine

== J ==
- Conor Jackson
- Damian Jackson
- Ron Jackson
- Baby Doll Jacobson
- Beany Jacobson
- Joe Jacques
- Lefty Jamerson
- Big Bill James
- Chris James
- Hal Janvrin
- Danny Jansen
- Kenley Jansen
- Kevin Jarvis
- Ray Jarvis
- Reggie Jefferson
- **Ferguson Jenkins**
- Tom Jenkins
- Bobby Jenks
- Jackie Jensen
- Marcus Jensen
- Luis Jimenez
- Keith Johns
- Brian Johnson
- Indian Bob Johnson
- Deron Johnson
- Earl Johnson
- Hank Johnson
- Jason Johnson
- John Henry Johnson
- Kelly Johnson
- Rankin Johnson
- Roy Johnson
- Vic Johnson
- Joel Johnston
- Smead Jolley
- Bobby M. Jones
- Charlie Jones
- Dalton Jones
- Hunter Jones
- Jake Jones
- Rick Jones
- Sad Sam Jones
- Todd Jones
- Eddie Joost
- Duane Josephson
- Oscar Judd
- Joe Judge
- Ed Jurak

== K ==
- Ryan Kalish
- Rudy Kallio
- Gabe Kapler
- Ed Karger
- Andy Karl
- Marty Karow
- Benn Karr
- Eddie Kasko
- **George Kell**
- Brad Keller
- Al Kellett
- Red Kellett
- Trevor Kelley
- Win Kellum
- Ed Kelly
- Joe Kelly
- Zack Kelly
- Ken Keltner
- Russ Kemmerer
- Fred Kendall
- Kyle Kendrick
- Bill Kennedy
- John Kennedy
- Marty Keough
- Mike Kickham
- Dana Kiecker
- Joe Kiefer
- Bobby Kielty
- Leo Kiely
- Jack Killilay
- Byung-hyun Kim
- Sun-Woo Kim
- Craig Kimbrel
- Ellis Kinder
- Isiah Kiner-Falefa
- Walt Kinney
- Ian Kinsler
- Bruce Kison
- Billy Klaus
- Red Kleinow
- Bob Kline
- Ron Kline
- Bob Klinger
- Corey Kluber
- Brent Knackert
- John Knight
- Hal Kolstad
- Cal Koonce
- Andy Kosco
- Casey Kotchman
- Mark Kotsay
- George Kottaras
- Jack Kramer
- Lew Krausse Jr.
- Rick Kreuger
- Rube Kroh
- John Kroner
- Marty Krug
- Randy Kutcher

== L ==
- Candy LaChance
- John Lackey
- Kerry Lacy
- Ty LaForest
- Roger LaFrancois
- Joe Lahoud
- Eddie Lake
- Travis Lakins
- Jack Lamabe
- Bill Lamar
- Ryan LaMarre
- Dinelson Lamet
- Dennis Lamp
- Rick Lancellotti
- Bill Landis
- Jim Landis
- Sam Langford
- Carney Lansford
- Mike Lansing
- Frank LaPorte
- Adam LaRoche
- John LaRose
- Lyn Lary
- Ryan Lavarnway
- Tommy Layne
- Johnny Lazor
- Bill Lee
- Dud Lee
- Sang-Hoon Lee
- Bill Lefebvre
- Lou Legett
- Regis Leheny
- Paul Lehner
- Nemo Leibold
- John Leister
- Mark Lemke
- Don Lenhardt
- Sandy Leon
- Dutch Leonard
- Ted Lepcio
- Dutch Lerchen
- Louis Leroy
- Robinson Leyer
- Curtis Leskanic
- Jon Lester
- Darren Lewis
- Duffy Lewis
- Jack Lewis
- Ted Lewis
- Jim Leyritz
- John Lickert
- Pat Light
- Brent Lillibridge
- Derek Lilliquist
- Che-Hsuan Lin
- Tzu-Wei Lin
- Johnny Lipon
- Hod Lisenbee
- Zack Littell
- Dick Littlefield
- Greg Litton
- Mauricio Llovera
- Don Lock
- Skip Lockwood
- George Loepp
- James Lofton
- Tim Lollar
- Steve Lomasney
- Jim Lonborg
- Walter Lonergan
- James Loney
- Brian Looney
- Felipe López
- Jack López
- Javier López
- Javy López
- Harry Lord
- Mark Loretta
- Derek Lowe
- Nathaniel Lowe
- Mike Lowell
- Jed Lowrie
- Johnny Lucas
- Joe Lucey
- Lou Lucier
- Jonathan Lucroy
- Julio Lugo
- Del Lundgren
- Tony Lupien
- Sparky Lyle
- Walt Lynch
- Fred Lynn
- Brandon Lyon
- Steve Lyons

== M ==
- Frank Malzone
- Deven Marrero
- Steven Matz
- Dustin May
- Marcelo Mayer
- Chris Mazza
- Dick McAuliffe
- Tom McBride
- Dick McCabe
- Windy McCall
- Emmett McCann
- Tom McCarthy
- David McCarty
- Tim McCarver
- Amby McConnell
- Mickey McDermott
- Allen McDill
- Darnell McDonald
- Jim McDonald
- John McDonald
- Ed McFarland
- Mike Macfarlane
- Danny MacFayden
- Eddie McGah
- Willie McGee
- Lynn McGlothen
- Art McGovern
- Bob McGraw
- Deacon McGuire
- Reese McGuire
- Alejandro Machado
- Jim McHale
- Marty McHale
- Stuffy McInnis
- Shane Mack
- Archie McKain
- Walt McKeel
- Jud McLaughlin
- Larry McLean
- Billy MacLeod
- Doc McMahon
- Don McMahon
- Marty McManus
- Norm McMillan
- Eric McNair
- Mike McNally
- Gordon McNaughton
- Jeff McNeely
- Norm McNeil
- Keith MacWhorter
- Jean Machi
- Bill McWilliams
- Bunny Madden
- Austin Maddox
- Mike Maddux
- Pete Magrini
- Ron Mahay
- Pat Mahomes
- Chris Mahoney
- Jim Mahoney
- Mark Malaska
- José Malavé
- Jerry Mallett
- Paul Maloy
- Matt Mantei
- Félix Mantilla
- Jeff Manto
- Robert Manuel
- Heinie Manush *
- Josías Manzanillo
- Phil Marchildon
- Johnny Marcum
- **Juan Marichal**
- Ollie Marquardt
- Bill Marshall
- Mike Marshall
- Babe Martin
- Chris Martin
- Kyle Martin
- Anastacio Martínez
- J.D. Martinez
- Michael Martínez
- **Pedro Martínez**
- Ramón Martínez
- Sandy Martínez
- Víctor Martínez
- John Marzano
- Justin Masterson
- Walt Masterson
- Tom Matchick
- Daisuke Matsuzaka
- William Matthews
- Gene Mauch
- Charlie Maxwell
- Wally Mayer
- Chick Maynard
- Carl Mays
- Román Mejías
- Mark Melancon
- Sam Mele
- José Meléndez
- Ski Melillo
- Bob Melvin
- Roman Mendez
- Ramiro Mendoza
- Mike Menosky
- Mike Meola
- Orlando Merced
- Andy Merchant
- Kent Mercker
- Cla Meredith
- Spike Merena
- Lou Merloni
- Jack Merson
- Catfish Metkovich
- Russ Meyer
- John Michaels
- Will Middlebrooks
- Dick Midkiff
- Doug Mientkiewicz
- Dee Miles
- Wade Miley
- Kevin Millar
- Andrew Miller
- Bing Miller
- Corky Miller
- Elmer Miller
- Erik Miller
- Hack Miller
- Mike Miller
- Otto Miller
- Rick Miller
- Trever Miller
- Wade Miller
- Buster Mills
- Dick Mills
- Rudy Minarcin
- Nate Minchey
- Doug Mirabelli
- Charlie Mitchell
- Fred Mitchell
- Johnny Mitchell
- Keith Mitchell
- Kevin Mitchell
- Herb Moford
- Dustan Mohr
- Gustavo Molina
- Vince Molyneaux
- Andruw Monasterio
- Bill Monbouquette
- Yoan Moncada
- Freddie Moncewicz
- Bob Montgomery
- Bill Moore
- Wilcy Moore
- Franklin Morales
- Jovani Morán
- Dave Morehead
- Mitch Moreland
- Roger Moret
- Cy Morgan
- Ed Morgan
- Red Morgan
- Ed Morris
- Frank Morrissey
- Clayton Mortensen
- Guy Morton Jr.
- Kevin Morton
- Earl Moseley
- Walter Moser
- Jerry Moses
- Wally Moses
- Doc Moskiman
- Brandon Moss
- Les Moss
- Taylor Motter
- Jamie Moyer
- Bill Mueller
- Gordie Mueller
- Billy Muffett
- Edward Mujica
- Greg Mulleavy
- Freddie Muller
- Joe Mulligan
- Frank Mulroney
- Bill Mundy
- Yairo Munoz
- Chris Murphy
- David Murphy
- Johnny Murphy
- Rob Murphy
- Tom Murphy
- Walter Murphy
- George Murray
- Matt Murray
- Tony Muser
- Paul Musser
- Alex Mustaikis
- Buddy Myer
- Elmer Myers
- Hap Myers
- Mike Myers

== N ==
- Chris Nabholz
- Tim Naehring
- Judge Nagle
- Mike Nagy
- Mike Napoli
- Bill Narleski
- Carlos Narváez
- Daniel Nava
- Yamaico Navarro
- Blaine Neal
- Ernie Neitzke
- Bry Nelson
- Joe Nelson
- Hal Neubauer
- Sean Newcomb
- Don Newhauser
- Jeff Newman
- Bobo Newsom
- Dick Newsome
- Skeeter Newsome
- Gus Niarhos
- Chet Nichols Jr.
- Reid Nichols
- Al Niemiec
- Harry Niles
- Al Nipper
- Merlin Nippert
- Otis Nixon
- Russ Nixon
- Trot Nixon
- Willard Nixon
- Hideo Nomo
- Red Nonnenkamp
- Chet Nourse
- Les Nunamaker
- Eduardo Nunez
- Jon Nunnally

== O ==
- Mike O'Berry
- Buck O'Brien
- Jack O'Brien
- Syd O'Brien
- Tommy O'Brien
- Lefty O'Doul
- Troy O'Leary
- Bill O'Neill
- Emmett O'Neill
- Tyler O'Neill
- Steve O'Neill
- Frank O'Rourke
- Sean O'Sullivan
- Frank Oberlin
- José Offerman
- Alexi Ogando
- Ben Oglivie
- Tomo Ohka
- Bob Ojeda
- Hideki Okajima
- Len Okrie
- Wyatt Olds
- John Olerud
- Darren Oliver
- Gene Oliver
- Joe Oliver
- Tom Oliver
- Hank Olmsted
- Karl Olson
- Marv Olson
- Ted Olson
- Steve Ontiveros
- George Orme
- Kaleb Ort
- **David Ortiz**
- Luis Ortiz
- Josh Osich
- Dan Osinski
- Harry Ostdiek
- Fritz Ostermueller
- Johnny Ostrowski
- Adam Ottavino
- Marv Owen
- Johan Oviedo
- Mickey Owen
- Spike Owen
- Frank Owens
- Henry Owens
- Chris Owings

== P ==
- Vicente Padilla
- Jim Pagliaroni
- Mike Palm
- Jim Pankovits
- Al Papai
- Larry Pape
- Jonathan Papelbon
- Stan Papi
- Freddy Parent
- Mel Parnell
- Larry Parrish
- Roy Partee
- Stan Partenheimer
- Ben Paschal
- Case Patten
- Eric Patterson
- Hank Patterson
- Marty Pattin
- David Pauley
- Don Pavletich
- James Paxton
- Mike Paxton
- Jay Payton
- Brad Peacock
- Johnny Peacock
- Steve Pearce
- Dustin Pedroia
- Carlos Peguero
- Eddie Pellagrini
- Rudy Pemberton
- Brad Penny
- Alejandro Peña
- Carlos Peña
- Jesús Peña
- Juan Peña
- Tony Peña
- Wily Mo Peña
- Brad Pennington
- **Herb Pennock**
- Zach Penrod
- José Peraza
- Martin Pérez
- **Tony Pérez**
- Matt Perisho
- John Perrin
- Robert Person
- Bill Pertica
- Johnny Pesky
- Roberto Petagine
- Gary Peters
- Bob Peterson
- Rico Petrocelli
- Dan Petry
- Tommy Pham
- Dave Philley
- Brandon Phillips
- Ed Phillips
- Hipólito Pichardo
- Val Picinich
- Calvin Pickering
- Urbane Pickering
- Jeff Pierce
- Bill Piercy
- Jim Piersall
- A. J. Pierzynski
- Kevin Pillar
- Joel Piñeiro
- George Pipgras
- Greg Pirkl
- Pinky Pittenger
- Nick Pivetta
- Juan Pizarro
- Kevin Plawecki
- Phil Plantier
- Herb Plews
- Jeff Plympton
- Scott Podsednik
- Jennings Poindexter
- Dick Pole
- Nick Polly
- Drew Pomeranz
- Ralph Pond
- Tom Poquette
- Rick Porcello
- Dick Porter
- Bob Porterfield
- Mark Portugal
- Nels Potter
- Ken Poulsen
- Bobby Poyner
- Arquimedez Pozo
- Del Pratt
- Larry Pratt
- George Prentiss
- David Price
- Joe Price
- Curtis Pride
- Doc Prothro
- Tex Pruiett
- César Puello
- Bill Pulsipher
- Nick Punto
- Billy Purtell
- Frankie Pytlak

== Q ==
- Paul Quantrill
- Frank Quinn
- Jack Quinn
- Rey Quiñones
- Carlos Quintana
- Guillermo Quiróz

== R ==
- Dick Radatz
- Dave Rader
- Ceddanne Rafaela
- Chuck Rainey
- Erasmo Ramírez
- Hanley Ramírez
- Manny Ramírez
- Noe Ramirez
- Ramón Ramírez
- Yohan Ramírez
- Anthony Ranaudo
- Pat Rapp
- Jeff Reardon
- Johnny Reder
- Josh Reddick
- Addison Reed
- Jerry Reed
- Jody Reed
- Pokey Reese
- Bobby Reeves
- Rob Refsnyder
- Bill Regan
- Wally Rehg
- Dick Reichle
- Mike Remlinger
- Win Remmerswaal
- Jerry Remy
- Tony Renda
- Hunter Renfroe
- Steve Renko
- Bill Renna
- Édgar Rentería
- Jason Repko
- Rip Repulski
- Carlos Reyes
- Dennys Reyes
- Pablo Reyes
- Carl Reynolds
- Gordon Rhodes
- Karl Rhodes
- Hal Rhyne
- **Jim Rice**
- Woody Rich
- Garrett Richards
- Dustin Richardson
- Jeff Richardson
- Al Richter
- Joe Riggert
- Topper Rigney
- Ernest Riles
- Yacksel Ríos
- Allen Ripley
- Walt Ripley
- Pop Rising
- David Riske
- Jay Ritchie
- Luis Rivera
- Carlos Rivero
- Dave Roberts
- Ryan Roberts
- Nick Robertson
- Billy Jo Robidoux
- Aaron Robinson
- Floyd Robinson
- Jack Robinson
- Hansel Robles
- Mike Rochford
- Bill Rodgers
- Carlos Rodríguez
- Eduardo Rodríguez
- Frankie Rodríguez
- Joely Rodríguez
- Steve Rodríguez
- Tony Rodríguez
- Billy Rogell
- Jake Rogers
- Lee Rogers
- Garry Roggenburk
- Billy Rohr
- Red Rollings
- Ed Romero
- J. C. Romero
- Mandy Romero
- Niuman Romero
- Kevin Romine
- Vicente Romo
- Buddy Rosar
- Brian Rose
- Si Rosenthal
- Buster Ross
- Cody Ross
- David Ross
- Robbie Ross Jr.
- Braggo Roth
- Jack Rothrock
- Rich Rowland
- Stan Royer
- Joe Rudi
- Muddy Ruel
- **Red Ruffing**
- Pete Runnels
- Ryan Rupe
- Allan Russell
- Jack Russell
- Jeff Russell
- Rip Russell
- **Babe Ruth**
- Josh Rutledge
- Adley Rutschman
- Jack Ryan (OF)
- Jack Ryan (P)
- Ken Ryan
- Mike Ryan
- Mike Ryba
- Gene Rye

== S ==
- Bret Saberhagen
- Blake Sabol
- Donnie Sadler
- Bob Sadowski
- Ed Sadowski
- Takashi Saito
- Chris Sale
- Jarrod Saltalamacchia
- Tyler Samaniego
- Joe Sambito
- Ali Sánchez
- Angel Sánchez
- Freddy Sánchez
- Rey Sánchez
- Yolmer Sánchez
- Ken Sanders
- Pablo Sandoval
- Danny Santana
- Marino Santana
- José Santiago
- Ángel Santos
- Tom Satriano
- Scott Sauerbeck
- Hirokazu Sawamura
- Dave Sax
- Bill Sayles
- Ray Scarborough
- Russ Scarritt
- Wally Schang
- Charley Schanz
- Bob Scherbarth
- Kyle Schwarber
- Chuck Schilling
- Curt Schilling
- Calvin Schiraldi
- Rudy Schlesinger
- Biff Schlitzer
- George Schmees
- Dave Schmidt
- Johnny Schmitz
- Scott Schoeneweis
- Dick Schofield
- Pete Schourek
- Ossee Schreckengost
- John Schreiber
- Al Schroll
- Don Schwall
- Everett Scott
- George Scott
- Robby Scott
- Tayler Scott
- Marco Scutaro
- Connor Seabold
- Rudy Seánez
- **Tom Seaver**
- Bob Seeds
- Diego Seguí
- Phil Seibel
- Anthony Seigler
- Kip Selbach
- Bill Selby
- Aaron Sele
- Jeff Sellers
- Steve Selsky
- Merle Settlemire
- Wally Shaner
- Howie Shanks
- Red Shannon
- Al Shaw
- Travis Shaw
- Mike Shawaryn
- John Shea
- Merv Shea
- Danny Sheaffer
- Ryan Shealy
- Dave Shean
- Andy Sheets
- Rollie Sheldon
- Keith Shepherd
- Neill Sheridan
- Ryan Sherriff
- Ben Shields
- Jason Shiell
- Strick Shofner
- Kelly Shoppach
- Ernie Shore
- Bill Short
- Zack Short
- Chick Shorten
- Brian Shouse
- Chase Shugart
- Terry Shumpert
- Norm Siebern
- Sonny Siebert
- **Al Simmons**
- Pat Simmons
- Lucas Sims
- Dave Sisler
- Grady Sizemore
- Ted Sizemore
- Camp Skinner
- Craig Skok
- Justin Slaten
- Jack Slattery
- Steve Slayton
- Heathcliff Slocumb
- Charlie Small
- Al Smith
- Aleck Smith
- Bob G. Smith
- Bob W. Smith
- Carson Smith
- Charlie Smith
- Chris Smith
- Dan Smith
- Dominic Smith
- Doug Smith
- Eddie Smith
- Elmer Smith
- Frank Smith
- George Smith (2B)
- George Smith (P)
- John Smith
- Josh Smith
- **Lee Smith**
- Paddy Smith
- Pete Smith
- Reggie Smith
- Zane Smith
- Mike Smithson
- **John Smoltz**
- Wally Snell
- Chris Snopek
- J. T. Snow
- Brandon Snyder
- Earl Snyder
- Kyle Snyder
- Nick Sogard
- Moose Solters
- Rudy Sommers
- Allen Sothoron
- Bill Spanswick
- Tully Sparks
- **Tris Speaker**
- Nate Spears
- Stan Spence
- Tubby Spencer
- Andy Spognardi
- Ed Sprague
- Jack Spring
- Jeffrey Springs
- Bobby Sprowl
- Chick Stahl
- Jake Stahl
- Matt Stairs
- Tracy Stallard
- Jerry Standaert
- Lee Stange
- Rob Stanifer
- Bob Stanley
- Mike Stanley
- Jack Stansbury
- Mike Stanton
- Dave Stapleton
- Jigger Statz
- Elmer Steele
- Ben Steiner
- Red Steiner
- Mike Stenhouse
- Gene Stephens
- Vern Stephens
- Jerry Stephenson
- Adam Stern
- Sammy Stewart
- Zach Stewart
- Dick Stigman
- Carl Stimson
- Chuck Stobbs
- Robert Stock
- Al Stokes
- Dean Stone
- George Stone
- Jeff Stone
- Howie Storie
- Trevor Story
- Matt Strahm
- Lou Stringer
- Amos Strunk
- Dick Stuart
- George Stumpf
- Tom Sturdivant
- Chris Stynes
- Jim Suchecki
- Denny Sullivan
- Frank Sullivan
- Haywood Sullivan
- Marc Sullivan
- Carl Sumner
- Jeff Suppan
- George Susce
- Drew Sutton
- Bill Swanson
- Bill Sweeney
- Ryan Sweeney
- Blake Swihart
- Greg Swindell
- Len Swormstedt

== T ==
- Jim Tabor
- Doug Taitt
- Frank Tanana
- Jesse Tannehill
- Domingo Tapia
- Raimel Tapia
- Arlie Tarbert
- José Tartabull
- La Schelle Tarver
- Willie Tasby
- Bennie Tate
- Jim Tatum
- Ken Tatum
- Jesús Tavárez
- Julián Tavárez
- Ben Taylor
- Harry Taylor
- Josh Taylor
- Scott Taylor
- Junichi Tazawa
- Birdie Tebbetts
- Yank Terry
- Jake Thielman
- Blaine Thomas
- Fred Thomas
- George Thomas
- Justin Thomas
- Lee Thomas
- Pinch Thomas
- Tommy Thomas
- Bobby Thomson
- Jack Thoney
- Hank Thormahlen
- Tyler Thornburg
- Matt Thornton
- Faye Throneberry
- Joe Thurston
- Luis Tiant
- Bob Tillman
- Mike Timlin
- Lee Tinsley
- Jack Tobin
- Johnny Tobin
- Phil Todt
- Kevin Tolar
- Payton Tolle
- Andy Tomberlin
- Tony Tonneman
- Abraham Toro
- Mike Torrez
- Billy Traber
- John Trautwein
- Sam Travis
- Andrew Triggs
- Joe Trimble
- Ricky Trlicek
- Dizzy Trout
- Frank Truesdale
- Mike Trujillo
- John Tudor
- Bob Turley
- Justin Turner

== U ==
- Tyler Uberstine
- Koji Uehara
- Tom Umphlett
- Bob Unglaub
- Ugueth Urbina
- Luis Urías
- Naoyuki Uwasawa

== V ==
- Tex Vache
- Carlos Valdez
- Enmanuel Valdez
- Julio Valdez
- Phillips Valdez
- Sergio Valdez
- Danny Valencia
- John Valentin
- Dave Valle
- Jermaine Van Buren
- Al Van Camp
- Ben Van Dyke
- Tim Van Egmond
- Jonathan Van Every
- Hy Vandenberg
- Jason Varitek
- Anthony Varvaro
- Mo Vaughn
- Christian Vázquez
- Ramón Vázquez
- Bobby Veach
- Bob Veale
- Héctor Velázquez
- Gil Velazquez
- Darío Veras
- Wilton Veras
- Alex Verdugo
- Mickey Vernon
- Sammy Vick
- Shane Victorino
- Brayan Villarreal
- Frank Viola
- Ossie Vitt
- Clyde Vollmer
- Jake Volz
- Joe Vosmik

== W ==
- Michael Wacha
- Jake Wade
- **Billy Wagner**
- Charlie Wagner
- Gary Wagner
- Hal Wagner
- Heinie Wagner
- Tim Wakefield
- Rube Walberg
- Marcus Walden
- Chico Walker
- Tilly Walker
- Todd Walker
- Murray Wall
- Jimmy Walsh
- Brandon Walter
- Bucky Walters
- Fred Walters
- Roxy Walters
- Bill Wambsganss
- Pee-Wee Wanninger
- John Warner
- Rabbit Warstler
- John Wasdin
- Gary Waslewski
- Bob Watson
- Ryan Watson
- Johnny Watwood
- Monte Weaver
- Earl Webb
- Ryan Weber
- Allen Webster
- Lenny Webster
- Ray Webster
- Eric Wedge
- Jemile Weeks
- Bob Weiland
- Kyle Weiland
- Zack Weiss
- Greg Weissert
- Frank Welch
- Herb Welch
- Johnny Welch
- David Wells
- Tony Welzer
- Fred Wenz
- Billy Werber
- Bill Werle
- Vic Wertz
- Jamie Westbrook
- David West
- Eli White
- Dan Wheeler
- Matt White
- Sammy White
- George Whiteman
- Mark Whiten
- Garrett Whitlock
- Ernie Whitt
- Al Widmar
- Bill Wight
- Del Wilber
- Joe Wilhoit
- Dana Williams
- Dave Williams
- Denny Williams
- Dib Williams
- **Dick Williams**
- Ken Williams
- Randy Williams
- Rip Williams
- Stan Williams
- **Ted Williams**
- Scott Williamson
- Jim Willoughby
- Ted Wills
- Alex Wilson
- Archie Wilson
- Duane Wilson
- Earl Wilson
- Gary Wilson
- George F. Wilson
- Jack Wilson
- Jim Wilson
- John Wilson
- Justin Wilson
- Les Wilson
- Hal Wiltse
- Josh Winckowski
- Trey Wingenter
- Ted Wingfield
- George Winn
- Herm Winningham
- Tom Winsett
- George Winter
- Clarence Winters
- Rick Wise
- Johnnie Wittig
- Bob Wolcott
- Larry Wolfe
- Harry Wolter
- Connor Wong
- Joe Wood
- Smoky Joe Wood
- Ken Wood
- Wilbur Wood
- Steve Woodard
- John Woods
- Pinky Woods
- Chris Woodward
- Rob Woodward
- Shawn Wooten
- Brandon Workman
- Hoge Workman
- Al Worthington
- Jim Wright
- Steven Wright
- Tom Wright
- John Wyatt
- Weldon Wyckoff

== Y ==
- **Carl Yastrzemski**
- Steve Yerkes
- Rudy York
- Masataka Yoshida
- Kevin Youkilis
- Chris Young
- **Cy Young**
- Matt Young
- Tim Young

== Z ==
- Paul Zahniser
- Al Zarilla
- Norm Zauchin
- Matt Zeiser
- Brad Ziegler
- Charlie Zink
- Bill Zuber
- Bob Zupcic

== See also ==
- History of the Boston Red Sox
- List of Boston Red Sox managers
- Boston Red Sox coaches
- List of Boston Red Sox captains
- List of Boston Red Sox broadcasters
