= 1911 Boston Red Sox season =

Major League Baseball season

1911 Boston Red Sox
- League: American League
- Ballpark: Huntington Avenue Grounds
- City: Boston, Massachusetts
- Record: 78–75 (.510)
- League place: 4th
- Owners: John I. Taylor
- Managers: Patsy Donovan
- Stats: ESPN.com; Baseball Reference

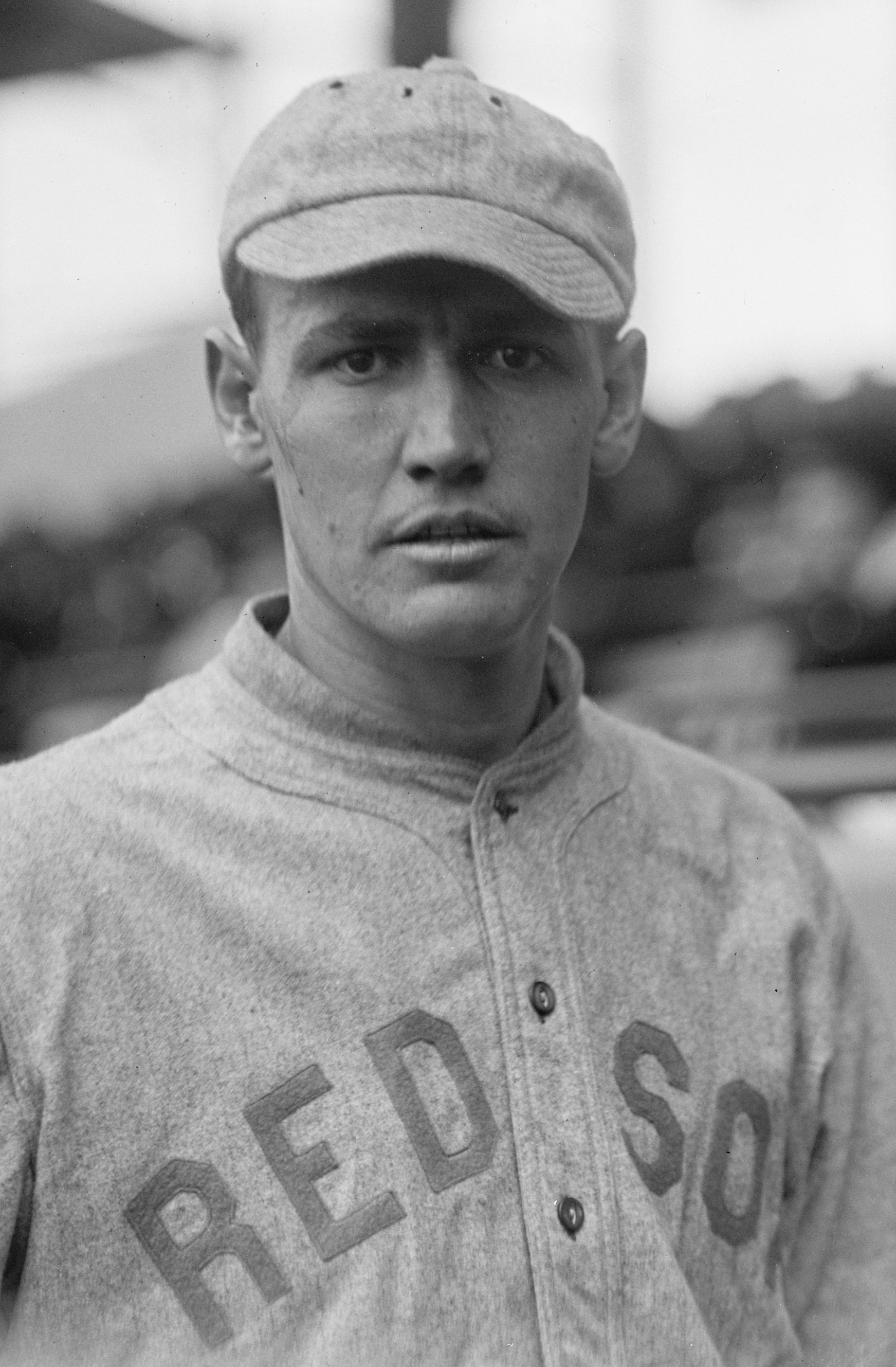
Opening Day pitcher Smoky Joe Wood

The 1911 Boston Red Sox season was the 11th season in the franchise's Major League Baseball history. The Red Sox finished fourth in the American League (AL) with a record of 78 wins and 75 losses, 24 games behind the Philadelphia Athletics, who went on to win the 1911 World Series. This was the final season that the Red Sox played their home games at Huntington Avenue Grounds, before moving to Fenway Park.

== Regular season ==
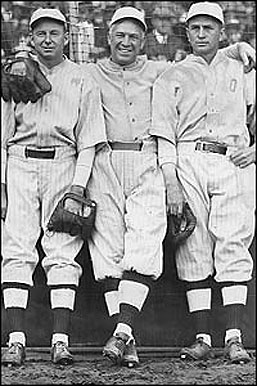
The "Golden Outfield" of (from left) Duffy Lewis, Tris Speaker, and Harry Hooper.

Prior to the regular season, the team held spring training in Redondo Beach, California.

- April 12: The regular season opens with an 8–5 loss to the Washington Senators at Griffith Stadium in Washington, D.C.
- April 21: The team wins its home opener against the Philadelphia Athletics, 13–4.
- July 24: Pitcher Smoky Joe Wood and outfielder Tris Speaker play in the Addie Joss Benefit Game in Cleveland; Wood is the starting pitcher for the all-star squad while Speaker, batting leadoff, has two hits in two at bats.
- August 5: The team releases Red Kleinow.
- September 9: The team's longest losing streak of the season, seven games, ends with a road win over Philadelphia.
- October 7: The regular season ends with an 8–1 home win over Washington; it is the team's sixth consecutive victory, their longest winning streak of the season.

The team's longest games of the season were 12 innings; a May 19 road win at Chicago, and an August 3 home win against Detroit.

=== Statistical leaders ===
The offense was led by center fielder Tris Speaker, who had eight home runs, 70 RBIs, and a .334 batting average. Boston's two regular corner outfielders, Duffy Lewis and Harry Hooper, hit .307 and .311, respectively. Collectively, they were known as the Golden Outfield. The pitching staff was led by Smoky Joe Wood with a 23–17 record, 2.02 ERA, and 231 strikeouts.

=== Season standings ===
American League
Team	W	L	Pct.	GB	Home	Road
Philadelphia Athletics	101	50	.669	—	54‍–‍20	47‍–‍30
Detroit Tigers	89	65	.578	13½	51‍–‍25	38‍–‍40
Cleveland Naps	80	73	.523	22	46‍–‍30	34‍–‍43
Boston Red Sox	78	75	.510	24	39‍–‍37	39‍–‍38
Chicago White Sox	77	74	.510	24	40‍–‍37	37‍–‍37
New York Highlanders	76	76	.500	25½	36‍–‍40	40‍–‍36
Washington Senators	64	90	.416	38½	39‍–‍38	25‍–‍52
St. Louis Browns	45	107	.296	56½	25‍–‍53	20‍–‍54

The team played no games that ended in a tie, for the first time in franchise history.

=== Record vs. opponents ===
1911 American League record Sources:
Team	BOS	CWS	CLE	DET	NYH	PHA	SLB	WSH
Boston	—	11–11	11–11	10–12	12–10	9–13	12–9	13–9
Chicago	11–11	—	6–15–2	8–14	13–9	9–11–1	17–5	13–9
Cleveland	11–11	15–6–2	—	6–16	14–8–1	5–17	15–7	14–8
Detroit	12–10	14–8	16–6	—	7–15	12–10	14–8	14–8
New York	10–12	9–13	8–14–1	15–7	—	6–15	16–5	12–10
Philadelphia	13–9	11–9–1	17–5	10–12	15–6	—	20–2	15–7
St. Louis	9–12	5–17	7–15	8–14	5–16	2–20	—	9–13
Washington	9–13	9–13	8–14	8–14	10–12	7–15	13–9	—

=== Opening Day lineup ===
Larry Gardner	2B
Harry Hooper	RF
Tris Speaker	CF
Duffy Lewis	LF
Heinie Wagner	SS
Rip Williams	1B
Clyde Engle	3B
Red Kleinow	C
Smoky Joe Wood	P

=== Roster ===
1911 Boston Red Sox
Roster
Pitchers: Jack Bushelman; Eddie Cicotte; Ray Collins; Casey Hageman; Charley Hall; Ed Karger; Jack Killilay; Marty McHale; Walter Moser; Judge Nagle; Buck O'Brien; Larry Pape; Charlie Smith; Frank Smith; Blaine Thomas; Smoky Joe Wood	Catchers: Bill Carrigan; Red Kleinow; Bunny Madden; Les Nunamaker; Tony Tonneman; Infielders: Tracy Baker; Hugh Bradley; Swede Carlstrom; Clyde Engle; Larry Gardner; Joe Giannini; Hy Gunning; Hal Janvrin; Jack Lewis; Walter Lonergan; Hap Myers; Billy Purtell; Heinie Wagner; Rip Williams; Steve Yerkes	Outfielders: Olaf Henriksen; Harry Hooper; Duffy Lewis; Joe Riggert; Tris Speaker; Les Wilson; Other batters: Jack Thoney	Manager: Patsy Donovan

== Player stats ==
=== Batting ===
==== Starters by position ====
Note: Pos = Position; G = Games played; AB = At bats; H = Hits; Avg. = Batting average; HR = Home runs; RBI = Runs batted in

Pos	Player	G	AB	H	Avg.	HR	RBI
C	Bill Carrigan	72	232	67	.289	1	30
1B	Clyde Engle	146	514	139	.270	2	48
2B	Heinie Wagner	80	261	67	.257	1	38
SS	Steve Yerkes	142	502	140	.279	1	57
3B	Larry Gardner	138	492	140	.285	4	44
OF	Tris Speaker	141	500	167	.334	8	70
OF	Duffy Lewis	130	469	144	.307	7	86
OF	Harry Hooper	130	524	163	.311	4	45

==== Other batters ====
Note: G = Games played; AB = At bats; H = Hits; Avg = Batting average; HR = Home runs; RBI = Runs batted in

Player	G	AB	H	Avg.	HR	RBI
Rip Williams	95	284	68	.239	0	31
Les Nunamaker	62	183	47	.257	0	19
Joe Riggert	50	146	31	.212	2	13
Olaf Henriksen	27	93	34	.366	0	8
Billy Purtell	27	82	23	.280	0	7
Jack Lewis	18	59	16	.271	0	6
Hugh Bradley	12	41	13	.317	1	4
Hap Myers	13	38	14	.368	0	0
Hal Janvrin	9	27	4	.148	0	1
Walter Lonergan	10	26	7	.269	0	1
Jack Thoney	26	20	5	.250	0	2
Bunny Madden	4	15	3	.200	0	2
Red Kleinow	8	14	3	.214	0	0
Hy Gunning	4	9	1	.111	0	2
Les Wilson	5	7	0	.000	0	0
Swede Carlstrom	2	6	1	.167	0	0
Tony Tonneman	2	5	1	.200	0	3
Joe Giannini	1	2	1	.500	0	0
Tracy Baker	1	0	0	----	0	0

=== Pitching ===
==== Starting pitchers ====
Note: G = Games pitched; IP = Innings pitched; W = Wins; L = Losses; ERA = Earned run average; SO = Strikeouts

Player	G	IP	W	L	ERA	SO
Smoky Joe Wood	44	275 2/3	23	17	2.02	231
Eddie Cicotte	35	220	11	15	2.82	106
Ray Collins	31	194 2/3	11	12	2.40	86
Larry Pape	27	176 1/3	10	8	2.45	49
Ed Karger	25	131	5	8	3.37	57
Buck O'Brien	6	47 2/3	5	1	0.38	31
Casey Hageman	2	17	0	2	2.12	8
Blaine Thomas	2	4 2/3	0	0	0.00	0
Frank Smith	1	2 1/3	0	0	15.43	1
Charlie Smith	1	2	0	0	9.00	0

==== Other pitchers ====
Note: G = Games pitched; IP = Innings pitched; W = Wins; L = Losses; ERA = Earned run average; SO = Strikeouts

Player	G	IP	W	L	ERA	SO
Charley Hall	32	146 1/3	8	7	3.75	83
Jack Killilay	14	61	4	2	3.54	28
Judge Nagle	5	27	1	1	3.33	12
Walter Moser	6	24 2/3	0	1	4.01	11
Jack Bushelman	3	12	0	1	3.00	5
Marty McHale	4	9 1/3	0	0	9.64	3
