= List of Major League Baseball players (G) =

The following is a list of Major League Baseball players, retired or active. As of the end of the 2011 season, there have been 934 players with a last name that begins with G who have been on a major league roster at some point.

== G ==
- Kason Gabbard
- Gabe Gabler
- John Gabler
- Ken Gables
- Len Gabrielson (1B)
- Len Gabrielson (OF)
- John Gaddy
- Eddie Gaedel
- Gary Gaetti
- Fabian Gaffke
- Phil Gagliano
- Ralph Gagliano
- Éric Gagné
- Greg Gagne
- Ed Gagnier
- Eddie Gaillard
- Del Gainer
- Jay Gainer
- Steve Gajkowski
- Augie Galan
- Andrés Galarraga
- Armando Galarraga
- Bob Galasso
- Rich Gale
- Denny Galehouse
- John Gall
- Al Gallagher
- Bob Gallagher
- Dave Gallagher
- Ed Gallagher
- Joe Gallagher
- Sean Gallagher
- Yovani Gallardo
- Mike Gallego
- Bert Gallia
- Phil Gallivan
- Mike Gallo
- Chick Galloway
- Balvino Gálvez
- Jim Galvin
- Lou Galvin
- Pud Galvin β
- Mat Gamel
- Chick Gandil
- Bob Ganley
- Bill Gannon
- Ron Gant
- Jim Gantner
- Oscar Gamble
- Babe Ganzel
- Charlie Ganzel
- John Ganzel
- Eddy Garabito
- Joe Garagiola
- Víctor Gárate
- Bob Garbark
- Mike Garbark
- Gene Garber
- Bárbaro Garbey
- Rich Garcés
- Anderson García
- Carlos García
- Chico García
- Dámaso García
- Danny Garcia (OF)
- Danny Garcia (2B)
- Freddy Garcia (IF)
- Freddy Garcia (P)
- Harvey García
- Jaime García
- Jesse Garcia
- José García
- Karim García
- Kiko Garcia
- Leo Garcia
- Luis García
- Miguel García
- Mike Garcia (AL P)
- Mike Garcia (NL P)
- Pedro García
- Ramón García
- Reynaldo Garcia
- Rosman García
- Nomar Garciaparra
- Danny Gardella
- Ron Gardenhire
- Bill Garfield
- Mike Gardiner
- Alex Gardner
- Billy Gardner
- Brett Gardner
- Gid Gardner
- Glenn Gardner
- Jeff Gardner
- Larry Gardner
- Lee Gardner
- Mark Gardner
- Wes Gardner
- Bob Garibaldi
- Ryan Garko
- Jon Garland
- Wayne Garland
- Mike Garman
- Debs Garms
- Phil Garner
- Ralph Garr
- Scott Garrelts
- Adrian Garrett
- Greg Garrett
- Wayne Garrett
- Gil Garrido
- Cliff Garrison
- Ford Garrison
- Webster Garrison
- Ned Garver
- Steve Garvey
- Jerry Garvin
- Ned Garvin
- Matt Garza
- Harry Gaspar
- Rod Gaspar
- Dave Gassner
- Tom Gastall
- Alex Gaston
- Cito Gaston
- Milt Gaston
- Welcome Gaston
- Hank Gastright
- Brent Gates
- Joe Gates
- Aubrey Gatewood
- Frank Gatins
- Joey Gathright
- Chad Gaudin
- Sid Gautreaux
- Mike Gazella
- Geoff Geary
- Huck Geary
- Elmer Gedeon
- Joe Gedeon
- Rich Gedman
- Count Gedney
- Johnny Gee
- Billy Geer
- Josh Geer
- Charlie Geggus
- Lou Gehrig β
- Charlie Gehringer β
- Gary Geiger
- Dave Geisel
- Bill Geiss
- Emil Geiss
- Vern Geishert
- Charlie Gelbert
- Joe Genewich
- Jim Gentile
- Craig Gentry
- Gary Gentry
- Rufe Gentry
- Chris George (LH P)
- Chris George (RH P)
- Greek George
- Craig Gerber
- Wally Gerber
- Bob Geren
- Joe Gerhardt
- Al Gerheauser
- Steve Gerkin
- Esteban Germán
- Franklyn Germán
- Les German
- Justin Germano
- Dick Gernert
- César Gerónimo
- Jody Gerut
- Doc Gessler
- Al Gettel
- Byron Gettis
- Jake Gettman
- Chris Getz
- Gus Getz
- Charlie Getzien
- Chappie Geygan
- Patsy Gharrity
- Bob Giallombardo
- Jason Giambi
- Jeremy Giambi
- Joe Giannini
- Joe Giard
- Tony Giarratano
- Joe Gibbon
- Jay Gibbons
- John Gibbons
- Jake Gibbs
- Bob Gibson β
- Charlie Gibson (1905)
- Charlie Gibson (1924)
- Frank Gibson
- George Gibson
- Kirk Gibson
- Norwood Gibson
- Paul Gibson
- Robert Gibson
- Russ Gibson
- Sam Gibson
- George Gick
- Brett Gideon
- Floyd Giebell
- Paul Giel
- Dan Giese
- Benji Gil
- Gerónimo Gil
- Gus Gil
- Jerry Gil
- Andy Gilbert
- Billy Gilbert
- Charlie Gilbert
- Jack Gilbert
- John Gilbert
- Larry Gilbert
- Shawn Gilbert
- Tookie Gilbert
- Wally Gilbert
- Rod Gilbreath
- Bill Gilbreth
- Don Gile
- Brian J. Giles
- Brian S. Giles
- Marcus Giles
- Frank Gilhooley
- Bernard Gilkey
- Bob Gilks
- Pit Gilman
- George Gill
- Warren Gill
- Conor Gillaspie
- Carden Gillenwater
- Tom Gilles
- Bob Gillespie
- Jim Gillespie
- Paul Gillespie
- Patrick Gillespie
- Jim Gilliam
- Barney Gilligan
- Grant Gillis
- George Gillpatrick
- Len Gilmore
- Henry Gilroy
- Hal Gilson
- Héctor Giménez
- Joe Ginsberg
- Keith Ginter
- Matt Ginter
- Al Gionfriddo
- Ed Giovanola
- Charles Gipson
- Joe Girardi
- Chris Gissell
- Tony Giuliani
- Dave Giusti
- Dan Gladden
- Fred Gladding
- Fred Glade
- Roland Gladu
- Doug Glanville
- Jack Glasscock
- Troy Glaus
- Tommy Glaviano
- Mike Glavine
- Tom Glavine
- Ralph Glaze
- Bill Gleason (P)
- Bill Gleason (SS)
- Harry Gleason
- Jack Gleason
- Kid Gleason
- Roy Gleason
- Jerry Don Gleaton
- Jim Gleeson
- Frank Gleich
- Ed Glenn (OF)
- Ed Glenn (SS)
- Joe Glenn
- John Glenn (1870s)
- John Glenn (1960s)
- George Glinatsis
- Ross Gload
- Al Glossop
- Gary Glover
- Bill Glynn
- Ed Glynn
- Ryan Glynn
- Jimmy Gobble
- John Gochnaur
- Danny Godby
- Joe Goddard
- Tyrell Godwin
- Jerry Goff
- Chuck Goggin
- Greg Gohr
- Jim Golden
- Mike Golden
- Gordon Goldsberry
- Walt Goldsby
- Fred Goldsmith
- Wally Goldsmith
- Izzy Goldstein
- Lonnie Goldstein
- Purnal Goldy
- Mike Goliat
- Greg Golson
- Dave Goltz
- Jonny Gomes
- Wayne Gomes
- Alexis Gómez
- Carlos Gómez
- Chile Gómez
- Chris Gomez
- Lefty Gomez β
- Leo Gómez
- Luis Gómez
- Preston Gómez
- Randy Gomez
- Ruben Gomez
- Jesse Gonder
- Joe Gonzales
- Larry Gonzales
- Rene Gonzales
- Adrián González
- Alberto González
- Alex S. Gonzalez
- Álex González
- Andy González
- Carlos González
- Denny González
- Édgar Gonzalez (P)
- Edgar Gonzalez (2B)
- Enrique González
- Eusebio González
- Fernando González
- Geremi González
- Germán González
- Jose González
- Juan González
- Julio González
- Luis A. González
- Luis Gonzalez (OF, 1967)
- Luis González (OF, 1995)
- Mike Gonzalez (C)
- Mike González (P)
- Orlando González
- Raúl González
- Tony González
- Wiki González
- Johnny Gooch
- Andrew Good
- Ralph Good
- Wilbur Good
- Herb Goodall
- Dwight Gooden
- Billy Goodman
- Ival Goodman
- Ed Goodson
- Art Goodwin
- Curtis Goodwin
- Danny Goodwin
- Marv Goodwin
- Pep Goodwin
- Tom Goodwin
- Ray Goolsby
- Glen Gorbous
- Ray Gordinier
- Alex Gordon
- Brian Gordon
- Joe Gordon β
- Keith Gordon
- Sid Gordon
- Tom Gordon
- George Gore
- Reid Gorecki
- Rick Gorecki
- Charlie Gorin
- Bob Gorinski
- Herb Gorman
- Tom Gorman (1939)
- Tom Gorman (1950s)
- Tom Gorman (1980s)
- Nick Gorneault
- Hank Gornicki
- Johnny Gorsica
- Johnny Goryl
- Tom Gorzelanny
- Jim Gosger
- Goose Goslin β
- Mike Gosling
- Howie Goss
- Rich "Goose" Gossage β
- Dick Gossett
- Julio Gotay
- Rubén Gotay
- Jim Gott
- Al Gould
- Charlie Gould
- Nick Goulish
- Hank Gowdy
- Larry Gowell
- Mauro Gozzo
- Billy Grabarkewitz
- Rod Graber
- John Grabow
- Jason Grabowski
- Johnny Grabowski
- Earl Grace
- Mark Grace
- Mike Grace
- Franklyn Gracesqui
- John Grady
- Mike Grady
- Milt Graff
- Tony Graffanino
- Bernie Graham
- Charlie Graham
- Jack Graham
- Lee Graham
- Moonlight Graham
- Peaches Graham
- Skinny Graham (OF)
- Skinny Graham (P)
- Wayne Graham
- Joe Grahe
- Alex Graman
- Alex Grammas
- Curtis Granderson
- Jack Graney
- Jeff Granger
- Wayne Granger
- Eddie Grant
- Jim Grant
- Jimmy Grant
- Mark Grant
- Mudcat Grant
- George Grantham
- Rick Grapenthin
- Don Grate
- Beiker Graterol
- Danny Graves
- Dave Gray
- Dick Gray
- Dolly Gray
- Gary Gray
- Jeff Gray (1980s)
- Jeff Gray (2000s)
- Jim Gray
- Lorenzo Gray
- Pete Gray
- Sam Gray
- Ted Gray
- Eli Grba
- John Greason
- Craig Grebeck
- Andy Green
- Dallas Green
- Danny Green
- David Green
- Dick Green
- Fred Green
- Gary Green
- Gene Green
- Harvey Green
- Lenny Green
- Nick Green
- Pumpsie Green
- Scarborough Green
- Sean Green
- Shawn Green
- Steve Green
- Tyler Green
- Adam Greenberg
- Hank Greenberg β
- Al Greene
- Charlie Greene
- Khalil Greene
- Nelson Greene
- Paddy Greene
- Rick Greene
- Todd Greene
- Tommy Greene
- Tyler Greene
- Willie Greene
- Kent Greenfield
- Jim Greengrass
- Mike Greenwell
- Bill Greenwood
- Bob Greenwood
- Brian Greer
- Ed Greer
- Rusty Greer
- Hal Gregg
- Kevin Gregg
- Tommy Gregg
- Vean Gregg
- Tom Gregorio
- Lee Gregory
- Bill Greif
- Zack Greinke
- Seth Greisinger
- Ed Gremminger
- Reddy Grey
- Bobby Grich
- Ben Grieve
- Tom Grieve
- Ken Griffey Jr.
- Ken Griffey Sr.
- Alfredo Griffin
- Doug Griffin
- Ivy Griffin
- John-Ford Griffin
- Marty Griffin
- Mike J. Griffin
- Mike L. Griffin
- Pug Griffin
- Sandy Griffin
- Tom Griffin
- Bert Griffith
- Clark Griffith β
- Derrell Griffith
- Tommy Griffith
- Jeremy Griffiths
- Art Griggs
- Guido Grilli
- Jason Grilli
- Steve Grilli
- Bob Grim
- John Grim
- Burleigh Grimes β
- Oscar Grimes
- Ray Grimes
- Roy Grimes
- Charlie Grimm
- Myron Grimshaw
- Jason Grimsley
- Ross Grimsley
- Dan Griner
- Lee Grissom
- Marquis Grissom
- Marv Grissom
- Dick Groat
- Heinie Groh
- Steve Gromek
- Lee Gronkiewicz
- Bob Groom
- Buddy Groom
- Howdy Groskloss
- Emil Gross
- Gabe Gross
- Greg Gross
- Kevin Gross
- Kip Gross
- Turkey Gross
- Wayne Gross
- Jerry Grote
- Johnny Groth
- Lefty Grove β
- Orval Grove
- Charlie Grover
- Roy Grover
- Johnny Grubb
- Henry Gruber
- Kelly Gruber
- Mark Grudzielanek
- Ken Grundt
- Kevin Gryboski
- Cecilio Guante
- Eddie Guardado
- Creighton Gubanich
- Mark Gubicza
- Marv Gudat
- Mike Guerra
- Mario Guerrero
- Pedro Guerrero
- Vladimir Guerrero
- Wilton Guerrero
- Matt Guerrier
- Lee Guetterman
- Carlos Guevara
- Giomar Guevara
- Ron Guidry
- Aaron Guiel
- Carlos Guillén
- José Guillén
- Ozzie Guillén
- Bobby Guindon
- Ben Guiney
- Skip Guinn
- Mike Gulan
- Brad Gulden
- Don Gullett
- Tom Gulley
- Bill Gullickson
- Ad Gumbert
- Billy Gumbert
- Harry Gumbert
- Randy Gumpert
- Eric Gunderson
- Hy Gunning
- Tom Gunning
- Joe Gunson
- Larry Gura
- Ernie Gust
- Frankie Gustine
- Bucky Guth
- Jeremy Guthrie
- Mark Guthrie
- César Gutiérrez
- Franklin Gutiérrez
- Jackie Gutiérrez
- Juan Gutiérrez
- Ricky Gutiérrez
- Don Gutteridge
- Ángel Guzmán
- Cristian Guzmán
- Domingo Guzmán
- Freddy Guzmán
- Geraldo Guzmán
- Joel Guzmán
- José Guzmán
- Juan Guzman
- Doug Gwosdz
- Marcus Gwyn
- Chris Gwynn
- Tony Gwynn β
- Tony Gwynn Jr.
- Dick Gyselman
