= Marty McHale =

American baseball player (1886–1979)

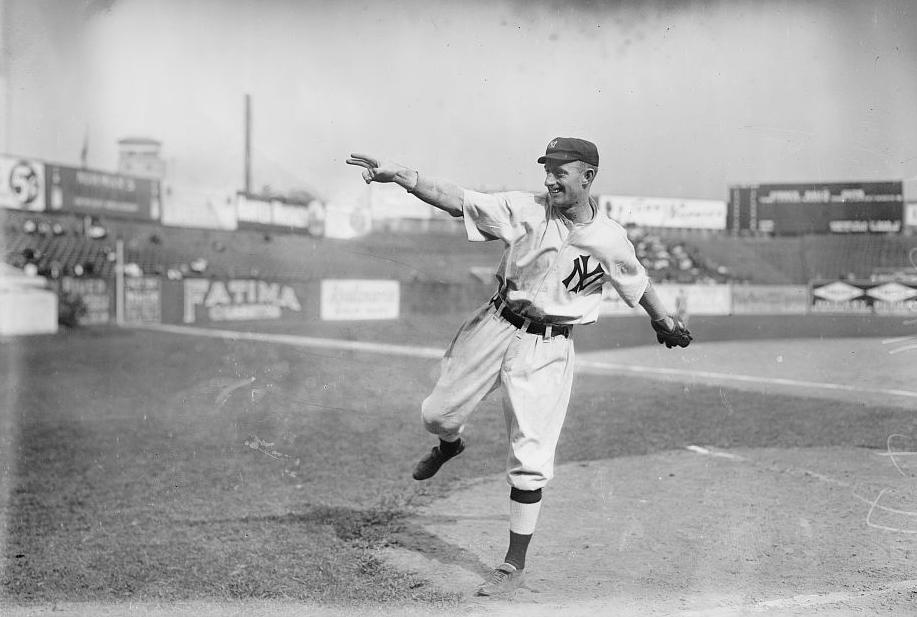
- McHale during the 1913 season
- Pitcher
- Born: October 30, 1886; Stoneham, Massachusetts, U.S.
- Died: May 7, 1979 (aged 92); Hempstead, New York, U.S.
- Batted: Right Threw: Right

MLB debut
- September 28, 1910, for the Boston Red Sox

Last MLB appearance
- May 8, 1916, for the Cleveland Indians

MLB statistics
- Win–loss record: 11–30
- Strikeouts: 131
- Earned run average: 3.57
- Stats at Baseball Reference

Teams
- Boston Red Sox (1910–1911); New York Yankees (1913–1915); Boston Red Sox (1916); Cleveland Indians (1916)

Martin Joseph McHale (October 30, 1886 – May 7, 1979) was an American professional baseball pitcher who played for the Boston Red Sox, New York Yankees and Cleveland Indians in Major League Baseball between 1910 and 1916. He also performed professionally in vaudeville and worked as a stockbroker.

== Baseball career ==
McHale was born in Stoneham, Massachusetts, as the third of five children born to Kate and Patrick McHale. He graduated from Stoneham High School. He attended the University of Maine and he played college baseball, college football, and track and field for the Maine Black Bears. While pitching for the baseball team, he threw three consecutive no-hitters in 1910.

Out of college, McHale received contract offers from a few different Major League Baseball teams, and chose to sign with the Boston Red Sox in May 1910, for a $2,000 signing bonus. He made his professional debut with the Brockton Shoemakers of the Class B New England League. McHale made his major league debut on September 28, 1910. He had a 0–2 win–loss record and a 4.61 earned run average (ERA) in two games started for Boston in 1910, and a 0–0 record and a 9.64 ERA in four games for the Red Sox in 1911. The Red Sox sold McHale to the Jersey City Skeeters of the Class AA International League before the 1912 season, along with Henri Rondeau, Hap Myers, Billy Purtell, Walter Lonergan, Jack Killilay, and Steve White, for Hugh Bedient. He spent the 1912 season with Jersey City.

After beginning the 1913 season with Jersey City, the New York Yankees purchased McHale from the Skeeters for $6,000 in August 1913. He pitched to a 2–4 record and a 2.96 ERA for the Yankees in 1913, and a 6–16 record and a 2.97 ERA in 1914.

McHale began the 1915 season with a 3–7 record and a 4.25 ERA, and the Yankees waived McHale in July 1915. The Yankees sold McHale to the Montreal Royals of the International League. He finished the 1915 season with the Richmond Climbers of the International League. He had a 4–9 record with Montreal and Richmond. The Yankees released McHale after the 1915 season. He signed with Boston in February 1916, and made two appearances for Boston before he was released during the season. He signed with the Cleveland Indians in May 1916, and made five appearances, pitching to a 5.56 ERA for Cleveland, before he was released in July.

== Vaudeville career ==
McHale performed professionally in vaudeville, singing as a tenor. Before he signed with the Red Sox, he performed in minstrel shows and two-act sketch shows in Boston, Wakefield, and Winchester, Massachusetts. When he signed with the Red Sox, he formed the Red Sox Quartette with teammates Buck O'Brien, Hugh Bradley, and Larry Gardner in 1910. Gardner left the group and was replaced by Bill Lyons, who was not a baseball player, but was signed to a contract with the Red Sox "to make the name of the act look proper", according to McHale. They performed in local venues, including Keith's Theatre, during the baseball offseasons. The group disbanded in 1913.

McHale teamed with Mike Donlin, starting in 1914, for an act they titled, "Right Off the Bat". In 1918, McHale enlisted in the United States Army Air Service, serving as a Lieutenant in the 22nd Regiment of Engineers. After Donlin moved to Hollywood to pursue his acting career, McHale continued to perform in a solo act. Variety once referred to McHale as "baseball's [Enrico] Caruso", and Babe Ruth called McHale "the best goddamn singer I ever heard!".

== Later life ==
After retiring from baseball, McHale wrote articles for The Evening Sun, which were sold by the Wheeler Syndicate to newspapers around the country. In 1920, he became a stockbroker. He joined a firm before opening his own, which he operated until he retired in 1972. He resided Hempstead, New York, in his later life.

McHale died in his home on May 7, 1979. His brother, John, served on Hempstead's town council.
