= Esty Chaney =

American baseball player (1891–1952)

- Pitcher
- Born: January 29, 1891; Hadley, Pennsylvania
- Died: February 5, 1952 (aged 61); Cleveland, Ohio
- Batted: Right Threw: Right

MLB debut
- August 2, 1913, for the Boston Red Sox

Last MLB appearance
- May 19, 1914, for the Brooklyn Tip-Tops

MLB statistics
- Win–loss record: 0–0
- Earned run average: 7.20
- Strikeouts: 1
- Stats at Baseball Reference

Teams
- Boston Red Sox (1913); Brooklyn Tip-Tops (1914)

Esty Clyon Chaney (January 29, 1891 – February 5, 1952) was a relief pitcher in Major League Baseball who played briefly for the Boston Red Sox (1913) and Brooklyn Tip-Tops (1914). Listed at 5 ft 11 in (1.80 m), 170 lbs., Chaney batted and threw right-handed. He was born in Hadley, Pennsylvania.

In a two-game career, Chaney posted a 7.20 ERA in 5.0 innings of work, including one strikeout, four walks and eight hits allowed without a decision or saves.

Chaney died at the age of 61 in Cleveland, Ohio.

== Sources ==
- Career statistics from Baseball Reference
