= Kilgore Gushers =

The Kilgore Gushers were a Minor League Baseball team that played in the East Texas League in 1931. The team was the first known professional team to be based in Kilgore, Texas. It was managed by Turkey Gross.

Name originated from the gushing of oil that shoots out of tops of oil wells, also called a blowout

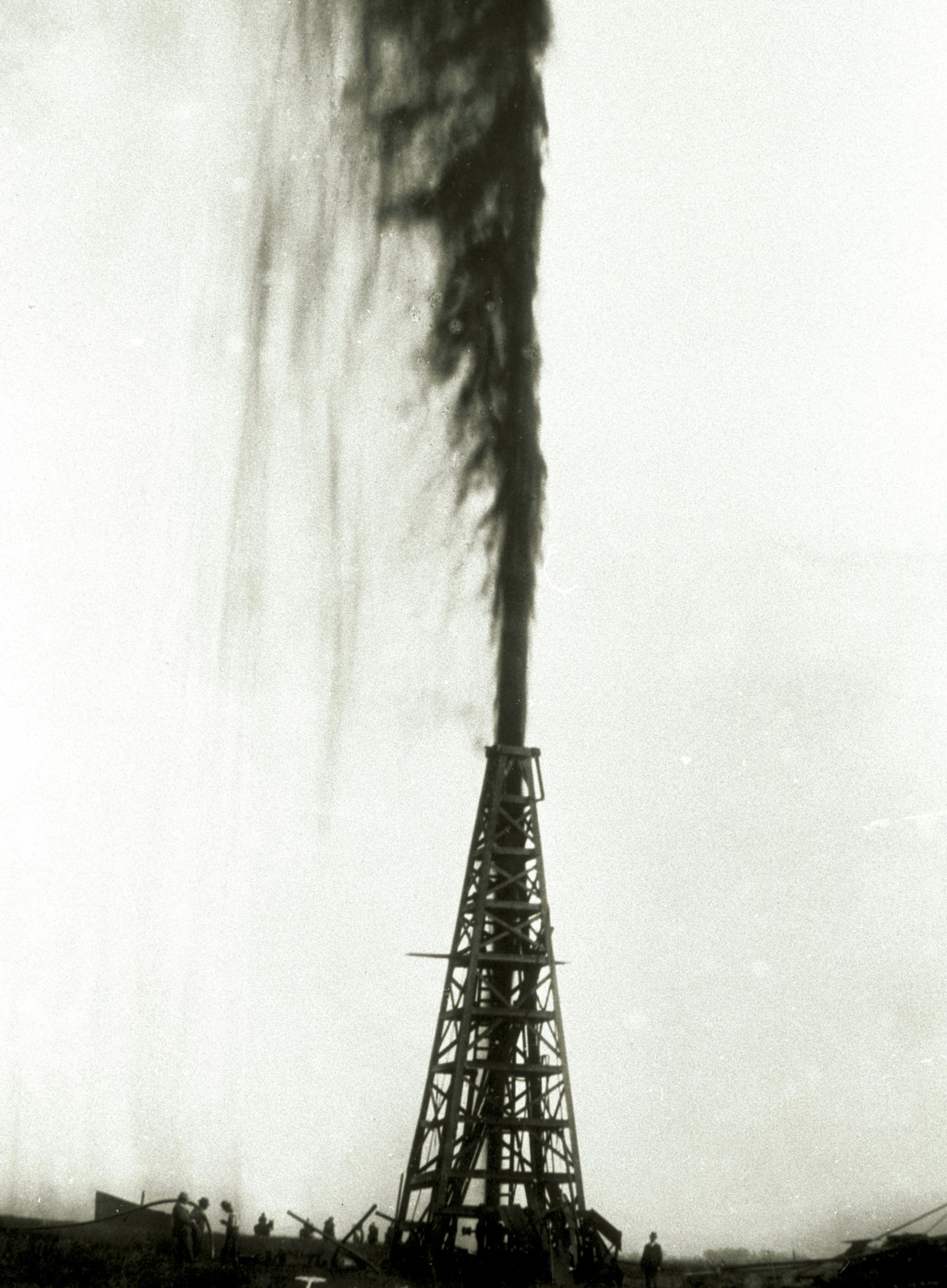
The Lucas Gusher (1901)
