= Jim Galvin (baseball) =

American baseball player (1907–1969)

James Joseph Galvin (August 11, 1907 – September 30, 1969) was an American pinch-hitter in Major League Baseball who played briefly for the Boston Red Sox during the 1930 season. Listed at 5 ft 11.5 in (1.82 m), 180 pounds (82 kg), Galvin batted and threw right-handed. He was born in Somerville, Massachusetts.

In a two-game career, Galvin went hitless in two at-bats for a .000 average. He also served as a catcher for 10 different Minor League clubs during 10 seasons spanning 1929–1939.

Galvin died in Marietta, Georgia, at the age of 62.

== See also ==
- Boston Red Sox all-time roster
