= Turkey Gross =

American baseball player (1896–1936)

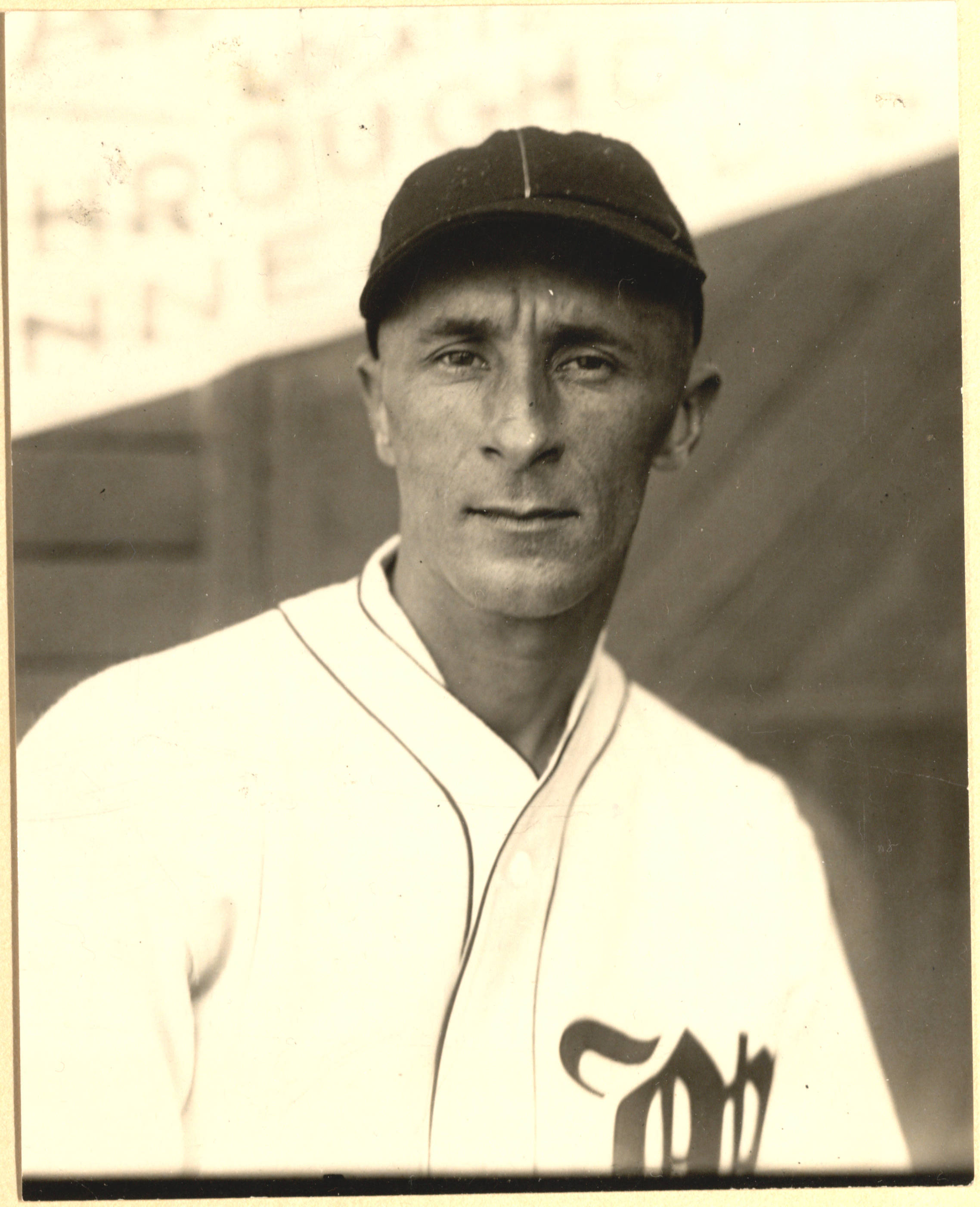
- Shortstop
- Born: February 21, 1896; Mesquite, Texas
- Died: January 11, 1936 (aged 39); Dallas, Texas
- Batted: Right Threw: Right

MLB debut
- April 14, 1925, for the Boston Red Sox

Last MLB appearance
- April 28, 1925, for the Boston Red Sox

MLB statistics
- Batting average: .094
- Hits: 3
- Home runs: 0
- Runs batted in: 2
- Stats at Baseball Reference

Teams
- Boston Red Sox (1925)

Ewell "Turkey" Gross (February 21, 1896 – January 11, 1936) was a shortstop in Major League Baseball who played briefly for the Boston Red Sox during the 1925 season. Listed at 6 ft 0 in (1.83 m), 165 lb., Gross batted and threw right-handed. Ewell "Turkey" Gross once completed an unassisted triple play at third base. He caught the hit, tagged the man coming from second base, and got the man headed for home plate as he attempted to scramble back to third base.

The son of Alfred and Mary Gross, Ewell played for several seasons in the Texas League during the 1920s and later served as manager of the Dallas Steers, Paris (Texas) Colts, and Kilgore Gushers.

He died of a kidney infection in 1936 and is buried in Mesquite Cemetery.

== See also ==
- Boston Red Sox all-time roster
- Kilgore Gushers
- List of baseball nicknames
