= Paul Maloy =

American baseball player (1892–1976)

- Pitcher
- Born: June 4, 1892; Bascom, Ohio, U.S.
- Died: March 18, 1976 (aged 83); Sandusky, Ohio, U.S.
- Batted: Right Threw: Right

MLB debut
- July 11, 1913, for the Boston Red Sox

Last MLB appearance
- July 22, 1913, for the Boston Red Sox

MLB statistics
- Win–loss record: 0–0
- Earned run average: 9.00
- Strikeouts: 0
- Stats at Baseball Reference

Teams
- Boston Red Sox (1913)

Paul Augustus Maloy (June 4, 1892 – March 18, 1976) was an American relief pitcher in Major League Baseball who played briefly for the Boston Red Sox during the 1913 season. Listed at 5 ft 11 in (1.80 m), 185 lb., Maloy batted and threw right-handed. He was born in Bascom, Ohio.

In a two-game career, Maloy, who was nicknamed "Biff", posted a 9.00 ERA with one walk and two hits allowed in 2.0 innings of work. He did not have a decision.

Maloy died in Sandusky, Ohio at age 83.
