= Hadley, Pennsylvania =

Unincorporated community in Pennsylvania, US

- Unincorporated community
- Location within Pennsylvania
- Coordinates: 41°24′50″N 80°13′59″W
- Country: United States
- State: Pennsylvania
- County: Mercer
- Elevation: 1,060 ft (320 m)
- Time zone: UTC-5 (Eastern (EST))
  - Summer (DST): UTC-4 (EDT)
- ZIP code: 16130
- Area codes: 724, 878
- GNIS feature ID: 1199876

Hadley is an unincorporated community in Mercer County, Pennsylvania, United States. The community is situated along Pennsylvania Route 358, 12.9 miles (20.8 km) north of Mercer.

Hadley has a post office, which uses ZIP code 16130.

== History ==
David Luse Hadley (December 9, 1806 – December 2, 1884 (aged 77)) came to Perry Township in 1843. While he was a shoemaker, he took an active part in clearing his lands and building mills. As a result, when the Lake Shore Railroad was built across the township and a station erected on land he donated, the locality was named Hadley in honor of his contributions.

The Hadley post office was established in May 1868, with David Pattison as postmaster. Several years later, the town was platted. A barrel factory was established in 1868, and became an important early industry. Hadley Presbyterian Church was organized in 1875; its building was dedicated the following year. A Methodist church was organized in 1882; its congregation erected a place of worship in 1884.
