= Bill Mundy =

American baseball player (1889–1958)

- First baseman
- Born: June 28, 1889; Salineville, Ohio, U.S.
- Died: September 23, 1958 (aged 69); Kalamazoo, Michigan, U.S.
- Batted: Left Threw: Left

MLB debut
- August 17, 1913, for the Boston Red Sox

Last MLB appearance
- October 4, 1913, for the Boston Red Sox

MLB statistics
- Batting average: .255
- Home runs: 0
- Runs batted in: 4
- Stats at Baseball Reference

Teams
- Boston Red Sox (1913)

William Edward Mundy (June 28, 1889 – September 28, 1958) was an American first baseman in Major League Baseball in 1913. He batted and threw right-handed. Mundy appeared in sixteen games for the Boston Red Sox, recording a .255 batting average with four runs batted in in his only major league season.
