= Eusebio González =

Cuban baseball player (1892–1976)

- Infielder
- Born: July 13, 1892; Havana, Cuba
- Died: February 14, 1976 (aged 83); Havana, Cuba
- Batted: Right Threw: Right

MLB debut
- July 26, 1918, for the Boston Red Sox

Last MLB appearance
- August 6, 1918, for the Boston Red Sox

MLB statistics
- Batting average: .400
- Hits: 2
- Triples: 1
- Stats at Baseball Reference

Teams
- Boston Red Sox (1918)

Eusebio Miguel López González [Papo] (July 13, 1892 – February 14, 1976) was a Cuban infielder who played briefly in Major League Baseball during the 1918 season. Listed at 5' 10", 165 lb., González batted and threw right-handed. He was born in Havana, Cuba.

González has the distinction of being the first Cuban player to play for the Boston Red Sox, and the 11th Cuban major leaguer overall. He appeared in three games with the 1918 American League champions Red Sox but did not play in the World Series. He went 2-for-5, including two runs and a triple, while playing at shortstop (2 games) and second base (1 game).

González died in his home town of Havana, Cuba at age 83.

== See also ==
- List of Major League Baseball players from Cuba
