= Ken Grundt =

American baseball player (born 1969)

- Pitcher
- Born: August 26, 1969 (age 57); Melrose Park, Illinois
- Batted: Left Threw: Left

MLB debut
- August 8, 1996, for the Boston Red Sox

Last MLB appearance
- May 20, 1997, for the Boston Red Sox

MLB statistics
- Games pitched: 3
- Win–loss record: 0–0
- Earned run average: 10.80
- Strikeouts: 0
- Stats at Baseball Reference

Teams
- Boston Red Sox (1996—1997)

Kenneth Allan Grundt (born August 26, 1969) is an American former middle-relief pitcher who played in Major League Baseball. Listed at 6'4", 195 lb., he threw left-handed.

Grundt went to Luther High School North in Chicago. He played college baseball with the Missouri Southern Lions, and got drafted by the San Francisco Giants in the 53rd round of the 1991 MLB June Amateur Draft (1,354th).

He played from 1992 through 1998 for the San Francisco Giants, Colorado Rockies, Boston Red Sox, and Florida Marlins organizations, collecting a 31–19 mark with a 2.58 ERA and 35 saves in 288 appearances.

Grundt entered the majors in 1996 with the Boston Red Sox (first game on August 8, 1996, at Age 26), playing for them until the 1997 midseason. He posted a 10.80 ERA in three games and did not have a decision. His last MLB game was on May 20, 1997.

Following his playing career, Grundt has worked as senior instructor at Frozen Ropes, a baseball instructional center located at Dickson City, Pennsylvania.

Grundt is married to his Wife, Amy, and they have a Son, Adam. They currently reside in Pennsylvania.

Currently, Grundt’s son, Adam, plays baseball for Wilkes University.
