= Dave Gray =

American baseball player (1943–2020)

- Pitcher
- Born: January 7, 1943; Ogden, Utah, U.S.
- Died: July 29, 2020 (aged 77); South Ogden, Utah, U.S.
- Batted: Right Threw: Right

MLB debut
- June 14, 1964, for the Boston Red Sox

Last MLB appearance
- September 14, 1964, for the Boston Red Sox

MLB statistics
- Win–loss record: 0-0
- Earned run average: 9.00
- Strikeouts: 17
- Stats at Baseball Reference

Teams
- Boston Red Sox (1964)

David Alexander Gray (January 7, 1943 – July 29, 2020) was an American pitcher in Major League Baseball who played briefly for the Boston Red Sox during the 1964 season. Listed at 6 ft 1 in (1.85 m) and 190 lb (86 kg), he batted and threw right-handed.

Gray played baseball at Ogden High School in Ogden, Utah, and, according to Gray, did not lose any games as a pitcher.

Gray was signed by the Red Sox out of the Weber State University. After spending his first year in professional baseball, 1963, at the minor league level, Gray was kept on Boston's Major League roster for the entire 1964 campaign to keep him from being drafted by other MLB teams under the terms of the Bonus Rule then in force. In nine Major League appearances, Gray posted a 9.00 ERA with 17 strikeouts and 20 bases on balls in 13 innings of work, allowing 18 hits. He had one starting pitcher assignment and six games finished, and did not register a decision.

Gray was one of only a few dozen major leaguers to have a perfect lifetime 1.000 batting average. On June 20, 1964, he singled off Milt Pappas of the Baltimore Orioles in the seventh inning of the game at Memorial Stadium. According Gray, Orioles catcher Andy Etchebarren told him before the pitch that Pappas would be throwing a fastball. It was Gray's only Major League at bat.

By the time he retired after the 1970 minor league season, Gray said he had lost all of his velocity.

Gray died on July 29, 2020, in South Ogden, Utah.

== Sources ==
- Career statistics from Baseball Reference · Retrosheet · Baseball Almanac
- Retrosheet
