= Red Kleinow =

American baseball player (1877–1929)

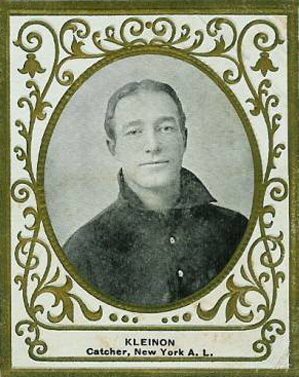
- Catcher
- Born: July 20, 1877; Milwaukee, Wisconsin, U.S.
- Died: October 9, 1929 (aged 52); New York City, U.S.
- Batted: Right Threw: Right

MLB debut
- May 3, 1904, for the New York Highlanders

Last MLB appearance
- September 6, 1911, for the Philadelphia Phillies

MLB statistics
- Batting average: .213
- Home runs: 3
- Runs batted in: 135
- Stats at Baseball Reference

Teams
- New York Highlanders (1904–1910); Boston Red Sox (1910–1911); Philadelphia Phillies (1911)

John Peter Kleinow (July 20, 1877 – October 9, 1929) was a reserve catcher in Major League Baseball who played from 1904 through 1911 for the New York Highlanders (1904–10), Boston Red Sox (1910–11) and Philadelphia Phillies (1911). Listed at 5 ft 10 in (1.78 m), 165 lb., Kleinow batted and threw right-handed. He was born in Milwaukee, Wisconsin.

In an eight-season career, Kleinow was a .213 hitter (354-for-1665) with three home runs and 135 RBI in 584 games, including 146 runs, 45 doubles, 20 triples and 42 stolen bases.

Kleinow died in New York City at age 52.
