= Larry Pape =

American baseball player (1885–1918)

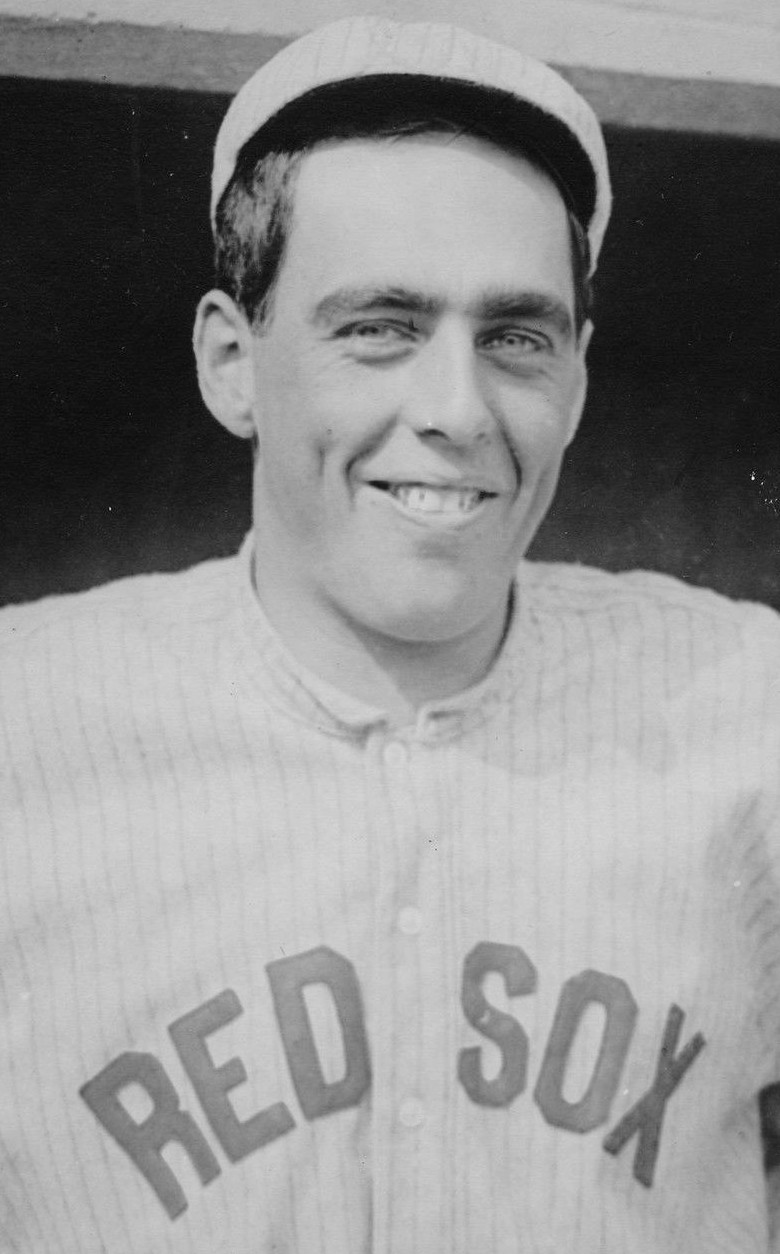
- Pitcher
- Born: July 21, 1885; Norwood, Ohio, U.S.
- Died: July 21, 1918 (aged 33); Swissvale, Pennsylvania, U.S.
- Batted: Right Threw: Right

MLB debut
- July 6, 1909, for the Boston Red Sox

Last MLB appearance
- September 26, 1912, for the Boston Red Sox

MLB statistics
- Win–loss record: 13–9
- Earned run average: 2.81
- Strikeouts: 84
- Stats at Baseball Reference

Teams
- Boston Red Sox (1909, 1911–1912)

Career highlights and awards
- World Series champion (1912)

Laurence Albert Pape (July 21, 1885 – July 21, 1918) was a pitcher in Major League Baseball who played his entire career for the Boston Red Sox between the 1909 and 1912 seasons. Listed at 5 ft 11 in (1.80 m), 175 lb., Pape batted and threw right-handed. He was born in Norwood, Ohio.

Pape began his baseball career with independent teams in a suburb of Cincinnati, before joining the Milwaukee Brewers of the American Association in 1908. He entered the majors in 1909 with the Red Sox, going 2–0 with a 2.01 ERA, appearing in 11 games as a starter, reliever and closer. He was demoted to Brockton a year later, being recalled in 1911 to join a Boston rotation that included Smoky Joe Wood, Ed Cicotte and Ray Collins. Pape responded with a 10–8 mark and a 2.45 ERA. He also was a member of the 1912 American League champion Red Sox, although he did not play in the World Series. The 1913 Reach Guide describes him as being used "mainly as a 'warm-up' pitcher" for the 1912 champions. Boston Globe reporter James O'Leary suggested that the reason he pitched so little in 1912 was that manager Jake Stahl lost confidence in Pape after he made an error in the first game at Fenway Park on May 17 which caused the Red Sox to lose. Sportswriter Hugh Fullerton explained Pape's non-use in the 1912 World Series by writing that although he was a good, effective pitcher," Fullerton felt that the Red Sox opponents, the New York Giants, would be able to hit him. Despite not playing in the World Series, Pape was honored as a champion at the post-victory celebrations.

In a three-season career, Pape posted a 13–9 record with 84 strikeouts and a 2.80 ERA in 51 appearances, including 24 starts, 13 complete games, two shutouts, one save, and 283⅓ innings of work.

After the 1912 season, Pape was sold to the Buffalo Bisons of the International League, after the Red Sox placed him on waivers, the Cincinnati Reds attempted to claim him, and the Red Sox pilled him off of waivers. Sportswriter Joe S. Jackson wrote an article in The Washington Post about the injustice of the situation, as Pape would have earned more if he went to the Reds. Pape never played for the Bisons, and quit baseball when the Bisons were going to send him to a Canadian team. He did not pitch at all in 1913, and was sold to the Portland Beavers after the season for $2000. He pitched ineffectively in nine games for the Beavers and was released during the season.

Pape died on his 33rd birthday in Swissvale, Pennsylvania. His death was reported as being due to complications from an old baseball injury in which he was hit by a ball in the stomach. However, the cause of death listed on his death certificate was glandular cancer.
