= Charlie Smith (pitcher) =

American baseball player (1880–1929)

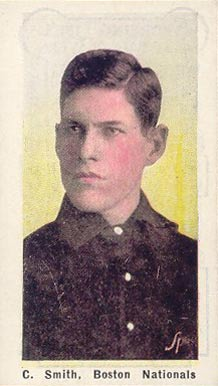
- Pitcher
- Born: April 20, 1880; Cleveland, Ohio, U.S.
- Died: January 3, 1929 (aged 48); Wickliffe, Ohio, U.S.
- Batted: Right Threw: Right

MLB debut
- August 6, 1902, for the Cleveland Bronchos

Last MLB appearance
- September 19, 1914, for the Chicago Cubs

MLB statistics
- Win–loss record: 66–87
- Earned run average: 2.81
- Strikeouts: 570
- Stats at Baseball Reference

Teams
- Cleveland Bronchos (1902); Washington Senators (1906–1909); Boston Red Sox (1909–1911); Chicago Cubs (1911–1914)

Charles Edwin Smith (April 20, 1880 – January 3, 1929) was a pitcher in Major League Baseball who played from 1902 through 1914 for the Cleveland Bronchos (1902), Washington Senators (1906–1909), Boston Red Sox (1909–1911) and Chicago Cubs (1911–1914). Listed at 6 ft 1 in (1.85 m), 185 pounds, Smith batted and threw right-handed. He was born in Cleveland, Ohio. His older brother, Fred Smith, was an infielder in the majors.

== Career ==
Smith always was a bad-luck pitcher either due to injury or playing on a bad baseball team. He had a promising debut for Cleveland on August 6, 1902, defeating future Hall of Famer Rube Waddell and the Philadelphia Athletics, 5–4, at League Park. Then, working with two days' rest, he shut out the Baltimore Orioles, 7–0, ending his rookie season with a 2–1 record in three starts.

He spent three years in the minors before joining the Senators in 1906. In three seasons for Washington, he posted ERAs of 2.91, 2.61 and 2.41, but finished with negative records of 9–16, 10–20 and 6–12. In 1909 he went 6–12 with a 3.27 ERA for Washington, before being traded to the Red Sox for Doc Gessler late in the season. In three starts for Boston he went 3–0 with a 2.16 ERA, and resurfaced in 1910 going 11–6 with a 2.30 ERA. While pitching for the Cubs, he led the National League with six relief wins in 1912.

In a 10-year career, Smith posted a 66–87 record with a 2.81 ERA in 212 appearances, including 148 starts, 87 complete games, 10 shutouts, three saves, and 1349 1/3 innings of work. A fine control pitcher, he collected a 1.62 strikeout-to-walk ratio (570-to-353).

== Death ==
Smith died at the age of 48 in Wickliffe, Ohio.
