= Jack Bushelman =

American baseball player (1885–1955)

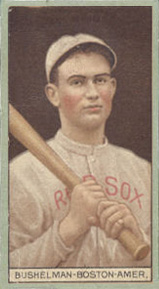
- Pitcher
- Born: August 29, 1885; Cincinnati, Ohio, U.S.
- Died: October 26, 1955 (aged 70); Roanoke, Virginia, U.S.
- Batted: Right Threw: Right

MLB debut
- October 5, 1909, for the Cincinnati Reds

Last MLB appearance
- May 13, 1912, for the Boston Red Sox

MLB statistics
- Win–loss record: 1–2
- Earned run average: 3.38
- Strikeouts: 13
- Stats at Baseball Reference

Teams
- Cincinnati Reds (1909); Boston Red Sox (1911–1912)

John Francis Bushelman (August 29, 1885 – October 26, 1955) was an American Major League Baseball pitcher who played for the Cincinnati Reds and Boston Red Sox. He batted and threw right-handed.

Bushelman attended the University of Cincinnati, Ohio, USA. He started his professional baseball career in 1906 in Winnipeg and made his major league debut late in the 1909 season. He pitched a complete game but lost.

From 1910 to 1914, Bushelman pitched mostly in the New England League. He played in six games for the Red Sox as well, but he did not distinguish himself enough to stick in the majors. In total, Bushelman posted a 1–2 record in 26.2 innings pitched in the major leagues. In 1913, he led the NENL in wins, with 26. He retired after the 1915 season.
