= Les Wilson (baseball) =

American baseball player (1885–1969)

- Outfielder
- Born: July 17, 1885; St. Louis, Michigan, U.S.
- Died: April 4, 1969 (aged 83); Edmonds, Washington, U.S.
- Batted: Left Threw: Right

MLB debut
- July 9, 1911, for the Boston Red Sox

Last MLB appearance
- August 9, 1911, for the Boston Red Sox

MLB statistics
- Batting average: .000
- At bats: 7
- Walks: 2
- Stats at Baseball Reference

Teams
- Boston Red Sox (1911)

Lester Wilbur Wilson (July 17, 1885 – April 4, 1969) was an American professional baseball player. He appeared in five games in Major League Baseball for the Boston Red Sox during the 1911 season. Listed at 5 ft 11 in (1.80 m), 170 lb., Wilson batted left-handed and threw right-handed. He was born in St. Louis, Michigan.

Wilson, who was nicknamed "Tug", went hitless in seven at bats (.000) and received two walks, without scoring or driving in any runs. In three appearances as an outfielder, two in left field and one in right (1), he collected a 1.000 fielding percentage in four chances.

Wilson died at the age of 83 in Edmonds, Washington.
