= Walter Lonergan =

American baseball player (1885–1958)

- Second baseman
- Born: September 22, 1885; Boston, Massachusetts, U.S.
- Died: January 23, 1958 (aged 72); Lexington, Massachusetts, U.S.
- Batted: Right Threw: Right

MLB debut
- August 17, 1911, for the Boston Red Sox

Last MLB appearance
- September 22, 1911, for the Boston Red Sox

MLB statistics
- Batting average: .269
- Home runs: 0
- Runs batted in: 1
- Stats at Baseball Reference

Teams
- Boston Red Sox (1911)

Walter E. Lonergan (September 22, 1885 – January 23, 1958) was an American second baseman in Major League Baseball who played briefly for the Boston Red Sox during the 1911 season. Listed at 5 ft 7 in (1.70 m), 156 lb., Lonergan batted and threw left-handed. He was born in Boston, Massachusetts.

In a 10-game career, Lonergan was a .269 hitter (7-for-26) with two runs, one RBI, and one stolen base. He did not have any extra-base hits. In nine fielding appearances, he committed three errors in 39 chances for a .923 fielding percentage.

Lonergan died in Lexington, Massachusetts, on January 23, 1958 at age 72.

== See also ==
- 1911 Boston Red Sox season
