= Joey Gathright =

American baseball player (born 1981)

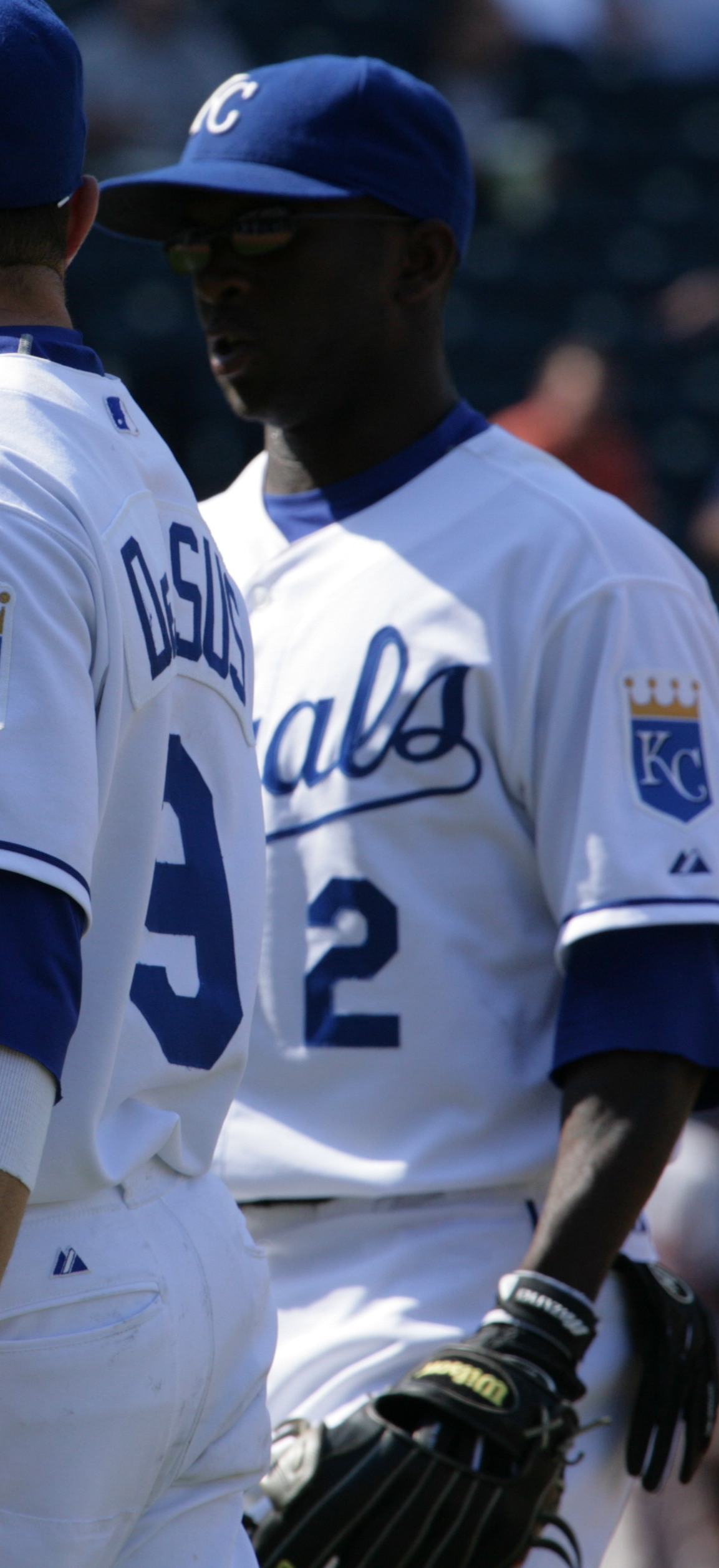
- Gathright with the Kansas City Royals
- Outfielder
- Born: April 27, 1981 (age 45); Columbia, Mississippi, U.S.
- Batted: Left Threw: Right

MLB debut
- June 25, 2004, for the Tampa Bay Devil Rays

Last MLB appearance
- September 28, 2011, for the Boston Red Sox

MLB statistics
- Batting average: .263
- Home runs: 1
- Stolen bases: 96
- Stats at Baseball Reference

Teams
- Tampa Bay Devil Rays (2004–2006); Kansas City Royals (2006–2008); Chicago Cubs (2009); Boston Red Sox (2009, 2011)

Joey Renard Gathright (born April 27, 1981) is an American former professional baseball outfielder. He played in Major League Baseball (MLB) for the Tampa Bay Devil Rays, Kansas City Royals, Chicago Cubs and Boston Red Sox. He was born in Hattiesburg, Mississippi.

== Early life ==
Gathright attended Bonnabel High School in Kenner, Louisiana, where he played baseball and football as a junior and boxed. He was drafted by the Tampa Bay Devil Rays in the 32nd round of the 2001 Major League Baseball draft, and signed in August after playing that summer in a Louisiana Sugar Cane League in Sorrento, Louisiana.

== Major league career ==
=== Tampa Bay Devil Rays (2004–06) ===
He made his major league debut with the Devil Rays on June 25, 2004.

Gathright was arguably one of the fastest players in major league baseball when he made his major league debut, and led all major league outfielders in range factor (3.06) in 2006. He does not hit for power (with only one home run in his MLB career). From 2006 to 2009, he had the lowest slugging average of players with at least 1000 plate appearances at .298. He has a .263 lifetime batting average going into the 2009 season.

Gathright was clocked at 6.1 seconds in the 60-yard dash. While in high school, he jumped over his coach's car. That jumping ability proved useful on the field, as in a 2008 spring training game Gathright jumped over Los Angeles Dodgers pitcher Hiroki Kuroda, who was trying to tag him out en route to first base.

In 2005, he hit .276 in 76 games, and drew 10 walks.

=== Kansas City Royals (2006–08) ===
On June 20, 2006, he was traded to the Kansas City Royals, along with infielder Fernando Cortez, for left-handed pitcher J. P. Howell. In the 2006 season, he batted .238 with a .321 on-base percentage, and a .292 slugging percentage. He hit his first, and to date only, home run on September 16, 2006, against Joel Piñeiro of the Seattle Mariners.

In 2007, Gathright broke up Bobby Jenks's major league record-tying streak of 41 consecutive batters retired. Gathright, who would have been the record 42nd batter, was able to get a hit.

While playing center field, his range factor per nine innings was below average in 2007, 2008, and 2009. In 2008 Gathright saw his range factor fall to 2.53, below all but one center field starter in the league. He also hit .254 with a .311 on-base percentage, and only a .272 slugging percentage—below that of all starting outfielders in the major leagues.

Gathright, while with the Royals, had a tendency to attempt to bunt for base hits in order to use his superior speed to reach base. However, he proved to be an inconsistent bunter, and thus his on-base percentage and batting average suffered.

=== Chicago Cubs (2009) ===
On December 16, 2008, three days after being non-tendered by the Royals, Gathright signed a one-year deal with the Chicago Cubs. and made his debut April 6 against the Houston Astros. In 20 games for the Cubs, he hit .214.

=== Baltimore Orioles (2009) ===
On May 8, 2009, after clearing waivers and being sent outright to the minors, the Cubs traded Gathright to the Baltimore Orioles for Ryan Freel. The Orioles sent him to the AAA Norfolk Tides, where he hit .329 in 80 games.

=== Boston Red Sox (2009) ===
On August 29, 2009, the Boston Red Sox acquired Gathright in exchange for either a player to be named later or cash considerations. He appeared in 17 regular season games, primarily as a pinch runner. He was on the post-season roster, where he made one appearance without an at-bat.

=== 2010: Toronto, Baltimore, Long Island ===
On December 13, 2009, the Toronto Blue Jays signed Gathright to a minor league contract. However, he was released on March 28 before the start of the season.

On March 30, 2010, he signed a minor league contract to return to the Orioles. He was released on July 22, 2010, after 61 games with Norfolk, where he hit only .185

On August 6, 2010, Gathright signed with the Long Island Ducks of the independent Atlantic League. He ended the season hitting .269 with 3 home runs and 19 RBI.

=== 2011: Shreveport-Bossier, Yuma, Boston ===
On April 13, 2011, Gathright signed with the Shreveport-Bossier Captains of the American Association of Independent Professional Baseball. He was released on June 7, 2011, after hitting .190 in 21 games.

He then signed, on June 10, 2011, with the Yuma Scorpions of the North American League, where he hit .347 in 61 games.

His performance got him another chance in the Majors and on August 31, 2011, he returned to the Red Sox. He appeared in 7 late season games with the Red Sox, as either a defensive replacement or pinch runner.

=== 2012 ===
He was signed by the Tigres de Quintana Roo of the Mexican League but later signed with the Bridgeport Bluefish of the Atlantic League of Professional Baseball.

On May 24, the Cincinnati Reds purchased Gathright's contract from the Bridgeport club. He reported to the Louisville Bats, Cincinnati's AAA minor league affiliate. He was released on July 14 after hitting .299 in 40 games.

=== 2013 ===
On July 2, 2013, Joey Gathright signed with the Kansas City T-Bones in the American Association of Independent Professional Baseball.
