= Tracy Baker =

American baseball player (1891–1975)

- First baseman
- Born: November 7, 1891; Pendleton, Oregon
- Died: March 14, 1975 (aged 83); Placerville, California
- Batted: Right Threw: Right

MLB debut
- June 19, 1911, for the Boston Red Sox

Last MLB appearance
- June 19, 1911, for the Boston Red Sox

MLB statistics
- Games played: 1
- At bats: 0
- Sacrifice hits: 1
- Stats at Baseball Reference

Teams
- Boston Red Sox (1911)

Trace Lee "Tracy" Baker (November 7, 1891 – March 14, 1975) was a first baseman in Major League Baseball who played for the Boston Red Sox. Baker batted and threw right-handed. He was born in Pendleton, Oregon, and studied at the University of Washington, where he played college baseball for the Huskies in 1910.

Of the more than 16,000 players in major league history, Baker is also among the 900-plus players on the Elias Sports Bureau registry who got into only one game. He was 19 years old. Baker's one big-league game came on June 19, 1911. In his only plate appearance, he executed a sacrifice bunt. On the field he made four putouts without committing an error.

Baker served in the US Army during World War I and worked in the Kaiser Shipyards during World II. He died in Placerville, California, at the age of 83.
