= Swede Carlstrom =

American baseball player (1886–1935)

- Shortstop
- Born: October 26, 1886; Elizabeth, New Jersey, U.S.
- Died: April 23, 1935 (aged 48); Elizabeth, New Jersey, U.S.
- Batted: Right Threw: Right

MLB debut
- September 12, 1911, for the Boston Red Sox

Last MLB appearance
- September 13, 1911, for the Boston Red Sox

MLB statistics
- Batting Average: .167
- Home Runs: 0
- RBI: 0
- Stats at Baseball Reference

Teams
- Boston Red Sox (1911)

Albin Oscar (Swede) Carlstrom (October 26, 1886 – April 28, 1935) was an American Major League Baseball shortstop. Carlstrom batted and threw right-handed. He was born in Elizabeth, New Jersey.

An American of Swedish heritage, Carlstrom was a combat veteran of World War I whose health was damaged during the armed conflict. He saw action in minor leagues with the Lawrence club of the New England League before joining the Boston Red Sox in the 1911 season. He appeared with Boston in two games on September 13–14 and posted a .167 batting average (1-for-6) without home runs or RBI. As a fielder, he recorded three put-outs with six assists and turned into a double play for a perfect 1.000 fielding percentage.

Carlstrom served with Company G, 346th Infantry, 27th Division in France, where he contracted rheumatism, which ended his baseball career. He died of a cerebral spinal fever in his hometown of Elizabeth, New Jersey, at the age of 48.
