= Harry Gleason =

American baseball player (1875-1961)

- Third baseman
- Born: March 28, 1875; Camden, New Jersey, U.S.
- Died: October 21, 1961 (aged 86); Camden, New Jersey, U.S.
- Batted: Right Threw: Right

MLB debut
- September 27, 1901, for the Boston Americans

Last MLB appearance
- October 8, 1905, for the St. Louis Browns

MLB statistics
- Batting average: .218
- RBI: 90
- Hits: 206
- Stats at Baseball Reference

Teams
- Boston Americans (1901–1903); St. Louis Browns (1904–1905)

Harry Gilbert Gleason (March 28, 1875 – October 21, 1961) was an American infielder and outfielder in Major League Baseball who played from 1901 through 1905 for the Boston Americans (1901–03) and St. Louis Browns (1904–05). Listed at 5' 6", 160 lb., Gleason was a utility player who batted and threw right-handed. He was born in Camden, New Jersey. His older brother, Kid Gleason, also was a major league player.

A line-drive hitter, Gleason delivered a single and stole a base in his first major league at-bat as a pinch-hitter with the Boston Americans. After that, he made 262 fielding appearances as a third baseman (202), shortstop (20) and second baseman (16), as well at center field (16) and left (8). His most productive season came with the 1905 St. Louis Browns, when he played a career-high 150 games including 144 as the team's regular third base, while hitting 17 extrabases with 45 runs and 57 RBI, also career numbers.

In a five-season career, Gleason was a .218 hitter (206-for-944) with three home runs and 90 RBI in 274 games, including 88 runs, 24 doubles, 11 triples, and 31 stolen bases.

Gleason died at his hometown of Camden, New Jersey at age 86.
