= Walter Moser =

American baseball player (1881–1946)

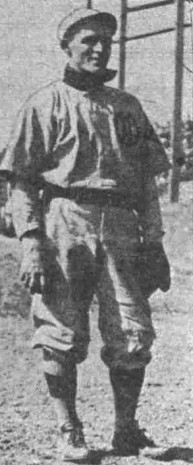
- Pitcher
- Born: February 27, 1881; Concord, North Carolina, U.S.
- Died: December 10, 1946 (aged 65); Philadelphia, Pennsylvania, U.S.
- Batted: Right Threw: Right

MLB debut
- September 3, 1906, for the Philadelphia Phillies

Last MLB appearance
- September 9, 1911, for the St. Louis Browns

MLB statistics
- Win–loss record: 0-7
- Strikeouts: 30
- Earned run average: 4.58
- Stats at Baseball Reference

Teams
- Philadelphia Phillies (1906); Boston Red Sox (1911); St. Louis Browns (1911)

Walter Frederick Moser (February 27, 1881 – December 10, 1946) was an American pitcher in Major League Baseball who played for the Philadelphia Phillies in 1906 and the Boston Red Sox and St. Louis Browns in 1911.

== Early life ==
He was born February 27, 1881, in Concord, North Carolina.

== Career ==
He began his career in 1906 in Minor League Baseball with the Lynchburg Shoemakers of the Virginia League. The Philadelphia Phillies purchased his contract and he went 0-4 that season. He returned to the minor leagues for the next four years and played with the Trenton Tigers; the Providence Grays; Baltimore; Atlanta; the Lancaster Red Roses; back with Lynchburg; and the Oakland Oaks. He had success in the minor leagues with season wins of 24, 14, 19, and 20. In 1910, he had 31 wins and 20 losses with Oakland.

His contract was purchased by the Boston Red Sox from Oakland. He lost one game and had an ERA of 4.01. His contract was sold to the Saint Louis Browns where he had zero wins, two losses, and had an ERA of 21.60.

In his two-season major league baseball career, Moser posted a 0–7 record with 4.58 earned run average in 14 appearances, including nine starts, 30 strikeouts, 30 walk, 97 hits allowed, and 70 2/3 innings of work.

He returned to minor league baseball and played with the Sioux City Packers; Trenton, New Jersey; Atlantic City, New Jersey; and Reading, Pennsylvania.

In 1919, he was the manager of a team in the Delaware River League and in 1922, of a team in Bastrop, Louisiana.

He was living in Philadelphia when he registered for the draft for World War II and was listed as working at Gulf Oil.

Moser died December 10, 1946, in Philadelphia and was interred at West Laurel Hill Cemetery in Bala Cynwyd, Pennsylvania. His death certificate listed him as an executive at Gulf Oil.
