= Joe Gonzales (baseball) =

American baseball player (1915–1996)

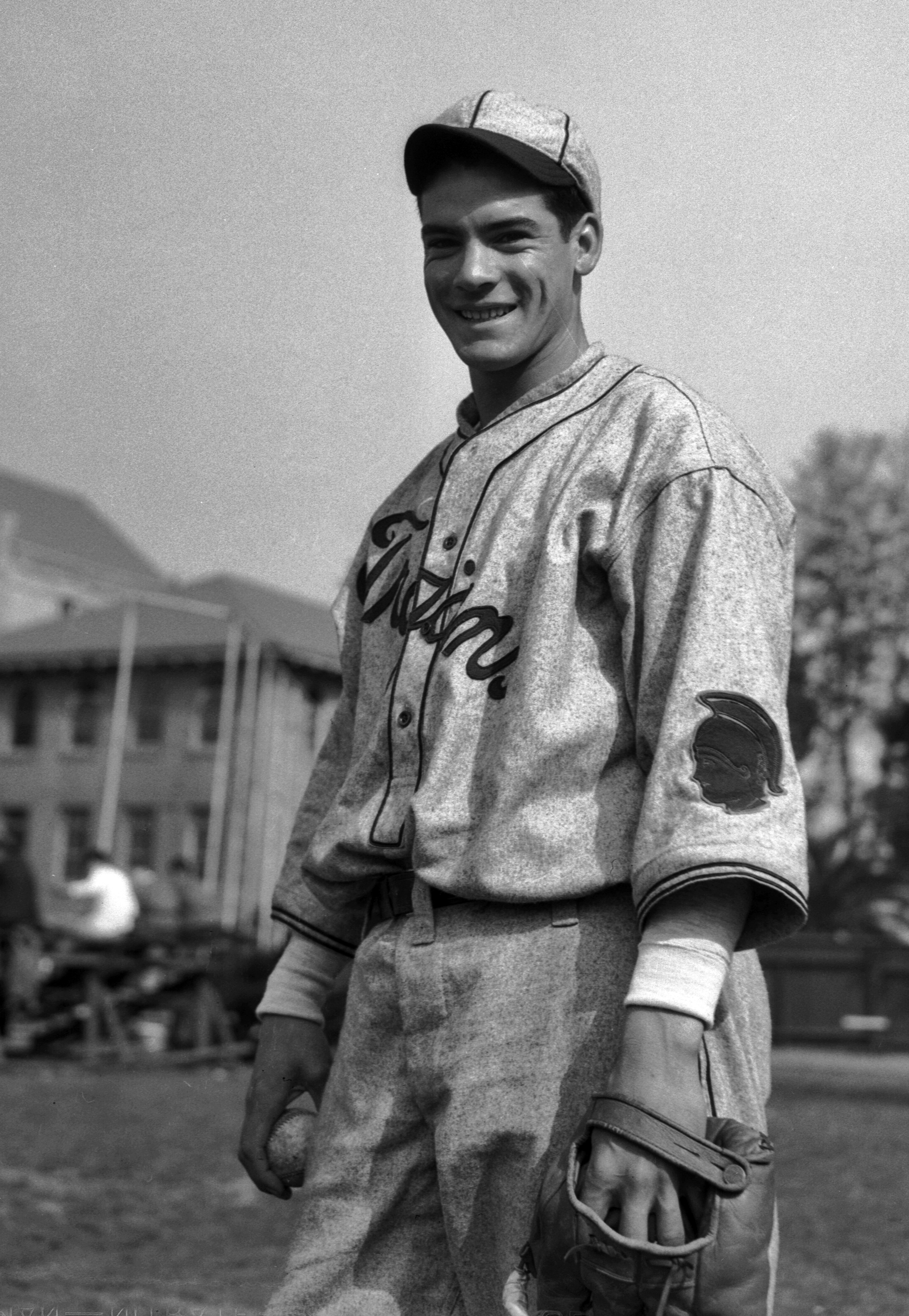
- Gonzales in 1936
- Pitcher
- Born: March 19, 1915; San Francisco, California, U.S.
- Died: November 16, 1996 (aged 81); Torrance, California, U.S.
- Batted: Right Threw: Right

MLB debut
- August 28, 1937, for the Boston Red Sox

Last MLB appearance
- October 3, 1937, for the Boston Red Sox

MLB statistics
- Win–loss record: 1–2
- Earned run average: 4.35
- Strikeouts: 11
- Stats at Baseball Reference

Teams
- Boston Red Sox (1937)

Joe Madrid Gonzales [Smokey] (March 19, 1915 – November 16, 1996) was an American pitcher in Major League Baseball who played briefly for the Boston Red Sox during the 1937 season. Listed at 5 ft 9 in (1.75 m), 175 lb., Gonzales batted and threw right-handed. He was born in San Francisco, California, but moved to Los Angeles as a child.

After graduating from Roosevelt High in 1933, Gonzales entered the University of Southern California, majoring in physical education and compiling a 19-game win streak while pitching for the Trojans baseball team. The Red Sox signed him out of USC and assigned him to the San Diego Padres of the Pacific Coast League, from whom they called him up before the 1937 season was over.

In eight games with the Red Sox, Joe Gonzales posted a 1–2 record with 11 strikeouts and a 4.35 ERA in 31.0 innings of work, including two starts and two complete games. That was the extent of his major league career, as the Red Sox farmed Gonzales out to the Little Rock Travelers of the Southern Association in 1938. He appeared as a pitcher and outfielder for a total of eleven minor league teams, making his last playing appearances while managing the Porterville Packers in the Sunset League in 1950.

After retiring from baseball, Gonzales was a field judge in the National Football League for 21 seasons, wearing number 54. He officiated in Super Bowl III. He also served as a teacher and baseball coach at Westchester High School and as baseball coach at Loyola University.

Gonzales died in Torrance, California, at age 81.
