= Tony Tonneman =

American baseball player (1881–1951)

- Catcher
- Born: September 10, 1881; Chicago, Illinois, U.S.
- Died: August 4, 1951 (aged 69); Prescott, Arizona, U.S.
- Batted: Right Threw: Right

MLB debut
- September 19, 1911, for the Boston Red Sox

Last MLB appearance
- September 22, 1911, for the Boston Red Sox

MLB statistics
- Batting Average: .200
- Home Runs: 0
- RBI: 3

Teams
- Boston Red Sox (1911)

Charles Richard Tonneman (September 10, 1881 – August 4, 1951) was an American reserve catcher in Major League Baseball who played two games for the Boston Red Sox during the 1911 season. Listed at 5 ft 10.5 in (1.79 m), 175 lb, Tonneman batted and threw right-handed. He was born in Chicago, Illinois.

In a two-game career, Tonneman hit a three-RBI double in five at-bats for a .200 batting average. As a catcher, he collected a .990 fielding percentage (two errors in 20 chances).

Tonneman died at the age of 69 in Prescott, Arizona.
