= Blaine Thomas =

American baseball player (1888–1915)

- Pitcher
- Born: August 1888; Glendora, California
- Died: August 21, 1915 (aged 26–27); Payson, Arizona
- Batted: Right Threw: Right

MLB debut
- August 25, 1911, for the Boston Red Sox

Last MLB appearance
- September 5, 1911, for the Boston Red Sox

MLB statistics
- Win–loss record: 0-0
- Strikeouts: 0
- Earned run average: 0.00
- Stats at Baseball Reference

Teams
- Boston Red Sox (1911)

Blaine M. "Baldy" Thomas (August 1888 – August 21, 1915) was a starting pitcher in Major League Baseball who played briefly for the Boston Red Sox during the 1911 season. Listed at 5' 10", 165 lb., Thomas batted and threw right-handed. He was born in Glendora, California.

In his one-season career, Thomas posted a perfect 0.00 earned run average with seven walks and three hits allowed in 4 1/3 innings of work and did not have a decision or strikeouts.

Thomas died at the age of 27 in Payson, Arizona.
