= Bunny Madden =

American baseball player (1882–1954)

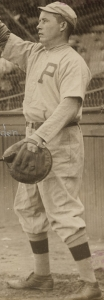
- Catcher
- Born: September 14, 1882; Roxbury, Massachusetts, U.S.
- Died: January 20, 1954 (aged 71); Cambridge, Massachusetts, U.S.
- Batted: Right Threw: Right

MLB debut
- June 3, 1909, for the Boston Red Sox

Last MLB appearance
- September 21, 1911, for the Philadelphia Phillies

MLB statistics
- Batting average: .287
- Home runs: 0
- Runs batted in: 11
- Stats at Baseball Reference

Teams
- Boston Red Sox (1909–11); Philadelphia Phillies (1911)

Thomas Francis "Bunny" Madden (September 14, 1882 – January 20, 1954) was an American backup catcher in Major League Baseball who played from 1909 through 1911 for the Boston Red Sox (1909–1911) and Philadelphia Phillies (1911). Listed at 5 ft 10 in (1.78 m), 190 lb., Madden batted and threw right-handed. A native of Boston, Massachusetts, he studied at Villanova University.

Early in the 1911 season, Boston and Bunny parted ways, and though he had a chance to play for Toledo he refused to go. On June 24, he was selected off waivers by the Philadelphia Phillies. In what remained of the 1911 season, he appeared in 28 games, and he hit .276 and drove in four runs. When the Phillies came to Beantown to play the National League's Boston Rustlers (soon to be the Braves), a sizable welcoming party greeted him with a basket of flowers.

Unfortunately, leaving the Red Sox in 1911 meant that Madden wasn't on the 1912 World Champion Red Sox team. Instead, he was in Louisville, then Montreal, and never appeared in another major-league game – though he played 10 more years in the minors. His final major-league stat line showed him with a .287 average in 150 plate appearances, with 11 RBIs to his credit.

In a three-season career, Madden was a .287 hitter (41-for-143) with 11 RBI in 56 games, including 10 runs four doubles, one triple, and a .329 on-base percentage. He did not hit any home runs. In 45 catching appearances, he committed 18 errors in 277 chances for a .935 fielding percentage.

The rest of his time was all spent playing Double-A baseball (at the time the highest minor league classification)–from 1912 through 1917 with the Montreal Royals, then 1918 and 1919 with the Newark Bears, and 1920 and 1921 with the Syracuse Stars. Over the course of those 10 seasons, he hit for a .251 average in 1,985 at-bats, his best season being the one in which he got into the most games: 1918 with Newark when he batted .297. In 1920, he was the last of four managers who skippered Syracuse in 1920. Busy as manager, he only appeared in 11 games in that final year, 1921, replaced during the season by Frank Shaughnessy.

What he did in 1922 is unclear but a brief report on April 3, 1923, New York Times reported that he had signed with the Springfield, Massachusetts ballclub – then managed by Patsy Donovan, Madden's manager with the Red Sox in 1910 and 1911. He never played for Springfield.

His World War II draft registration form indicated that he was living in Cambridge at 2 Inman Street with Mrs. Helen (Fahey) Madden. He worked for the New England Telephone Company on Harrison Avenue in Boston. By this time he had grey hair, blue eyes, and retained his ruddy complexion.

Tom Madden died in Cambridge, Massachusetts, at the age of 71, from mesenteric thrombosis.
