= Joe Giannini =

American baseball player (1888–1942)

- Shortstop
- Born: September 8, 1888; Drytown, California, U.S.
- Died: September 26, 1942 (aged 54); San Francisco, California, U.S.
- Batted: Left Threw: Right

MLB debut
- August 7, 1911, for the Boston Red Sox

Last MLB appearance
- August 7, 1911, for the Boston Red Sox

MLB statistics
- Batting average: .500
- Home runs: 0
- Runs batted in: 0
- Stats at Baseball Reference

Teams
- Boston Red Sox (1911)

Joseph Francis Giannini (September 8, 1888 – September 26, 1942) was an American shortstop in Major League Baseball who played briefly for the Boston Red Sox during the 1911 season. Listed at 5 ft 8 in (1.73 m), 155 lb., Giannini batted left-handed and threw right-handed. A native of Drytown, California, he was signed by Boston out of the University of San Francisco.

Giannini was a major leaguer whose career, statistically speaking, was only slightly different from that of Eddie Gaedel or Moonlight Graham. He appeared in one game and hit a double in two at-bats for a .500 average, without runs or RBI. As a fielder, he collected two assists and committed two errors for a .909 fielding percentage.

Giannini died in San Francisco, California, at age 54.
