= Hy Gunning =

American baseball player (1888–1975)

- First baseman
- Born: August 6, 1888; Maplewood, New Jersey
- Died: March 28, 1975 (aged 86); Togus, Maine
- Batted: Left Threw: Right

MLB debut
- August 8, 1911, for the Boston Red Sox

Last MLB appearance
- September 23, 1911, for the Boston Red Sox

MLB statistics
- Batting average: .111
- Home runs: 0
- Runs batted in: 2
- Stats at Baseball Reference

Teams
- Boston Red Sox (1911)

Hyland Gunning (August 6, 1888 – March 28, 1975) was a professional baseball player. He appeared in Major League Baseball (MLB) briefly for the Boston Red Sox during the 1911 season. He batted left-handed and threw right-handed. A native of Maplewood, New Jersey, he was signed by Boston out of the Princeton University.

In a four-game major-league career, Gunning had a .111 batting average (1-for-9) with two runs batted in (RBIs). Defensively as a first baseman, he recorded 25 put-outs and no assists, without any errors, for a 1.000 fielding percentage.

Gunning died in Togus, Maine, at age 86.

== Sources ==
- Career statistics from Baseball Reference · Baseball Reference (Minors) · Retrosheet · Baseball Almanac
