= Jack Killilay =

American baseball player (1887–1968)

- Pitcher
- Born: May 24, 1887; Leavenworth, Kansas, U.S.
- Died: October 21, 1968 (aged 81); Tulsa, Oklahoma, U.S.
- Batted: Right Threw: Right

MLB debut
- May 13, 1911, for the Boston Red Sox

Last MLB appearance
- September 22, 1911, for the Boston Red Sox

MLB statistics
- Win–loss record: 4–2
- Earned run average: 3.54
- Strikeouts: 28
- Stats at Baseball Reference

Teams
- Boston Red Sox (1911)

John William Killilay (May 24, 1887 – October 21, 1968) was an American pitcher in Major League Baseball who played for the Boston Red Sox during the 1911 season. Listed at 5 ft 11 in (1.80 m), 165 lb., Killilay batted and threw right-handed. He was born in Leavenworth, Kansas.

Killilay posted a 4-2 with 28 strikeouts and a 3.54 ERA in 14 appearances, including seven starts, one complete game, and 61 innings of work.

Killilay died in Tulsa, Oklahoma at age 81.
