= Billy Purtell =

American baseball player (1886–1962)

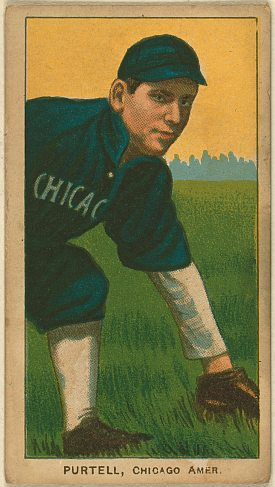
- Third baseman
- Born: January 6, 1886; Columbus, Ohio, U.S.
- Died: March 17, 1962 (aged 76); Bradenton, Florida, U.S.
- Batted: Right Threw: Right

MLB debut
- April 16, 1908, for the Chicago White Sox

Last MLB appearance
- September 22, 1914, for the Detroit Tigers

MLB statistics
- Batting average: .227
- Home runs: 2
- Runs batted in: 104
- Stats at Baseball Reference

Teams
- Chicago White Sox (1908–1910); Boston Red Sox (1910–1911); Detroit Tigers (1914)

William Patrick Purtell (January 6, 1886 – March 17, 1962) was an American professional baseball infielder. He played for 19 seasons between 1904 and 1928, including five seasons in Major League Baseball with the Chicago White Sox from 1908 to 1910, Boston Red Sox from 1910 to 1911, and Detroit Tigers in 1914. Purtell compiled a .227 batting average in 335 major league games.

== Early years ==
Purtell was born in Columbus, Ohio, in 1886. His father Patrick Purtell (born 1849), aka Pere Purtell, was an Irish immigrant who played professional baseball in the late 1860s and early 1870s and later worked as a foreman in a cracker bakery in Columbus. His mother Emma (born 1854) was an Ohio native.

== Professional baseball ==
=== Minor leagues ===
Purtell began playing professional baseball in 1904 at age 18 with the Columbus Senators and Decatur Commodores. He spent the next three seasons from 1905 to 1907, playing for Decatur.

=== Chicago and Boston ===
Purtell made his major league debut in April 1908 with the Chicago White Sox. He appeared in only 28 games with Chicago in 1908, compiling a .130 batting average. He remained with the White Sox in 1909, appearing in 103 games and batting .258.

Purtell had the best season of his career in 1910. He began the season with the White Sox. On May 10, he became the first player in major league history to strike out twice in the same inning, suffering the indignity at the hands of Walter Johnson. On August 9, 1910, Purtell was traded by the Chicago White Sox with Frank Smith to the Boston Red Sox for Harry Lord and Amby McConnell. During the full 1910 season, Purtell appeared in 151 games, 143 as a third baseman. He also led the American League in assists (320) and errors (49) by a third baseman in 1910. Purtell in 1910 also set a major league record for the fewest doubles (six) by a major league player appearing in 150 or more games. He also ranked third in the league with 32 sacrifice hits. He compiled a .210 batting average and collected 51 RBIs in 1910. Purtell remained with Boston in 1911, but appeared in only 27 games, 15 at third base, and compiled a .280 batting average.

=== Jersey City and Detroit ===
Purtell spent the 1912 and 1913 seasons playing for the Jersey City Skeeters in the International League. In 1914, Purtell returned to the major leagues with the Detroit Tigers. He appeared in 28 games, 16 at third base, and compiled a .171 batting average.

=== Minor leagues ===
After playing in the major leagues, Purtell continued to play in the minor leagues through the 1928 season, including stints with the Vernon Tigers of the Pacific Coast League in 1915, the Montreal Royals of the International League in 1917, the Toronto Maple Leafs of the International League in 1918 and 1919, the Toledo Iron Men of the American Association in 1918, the Akron Buckeyes of the International League in 1920, the Vancouver Beavers of the Pacific Coast International League as player-manager in 1921, the Columbia Comers of the South Atlantic League in 1926, and the Hagerstown Hubs of the Blue Ridge League as a player-manager in 1928.

In 1918, he was the starting third baseman for the Toronto Maple Leafs. The 1918 Maple Leafs have been rated as one of the top fifty minor league teams of all time. The team compiled an 88–39 record, and Purtell hit .311 in 101 games.

== Later years ==
After retiring from baseball, Purtell worked as a grip in a motion picture studio in 1920, a bartender at a club in 1930, and later a landscape engineer. In the late 1950s, he moved to Bradenton, Florida. Purtell died in 1962 at age 76 at a rest home in Bradenton. He was buried at Mansion Memorial Park in Ellenton, Florida.
