= Hap Myers =

American baseball player (1887–1967)

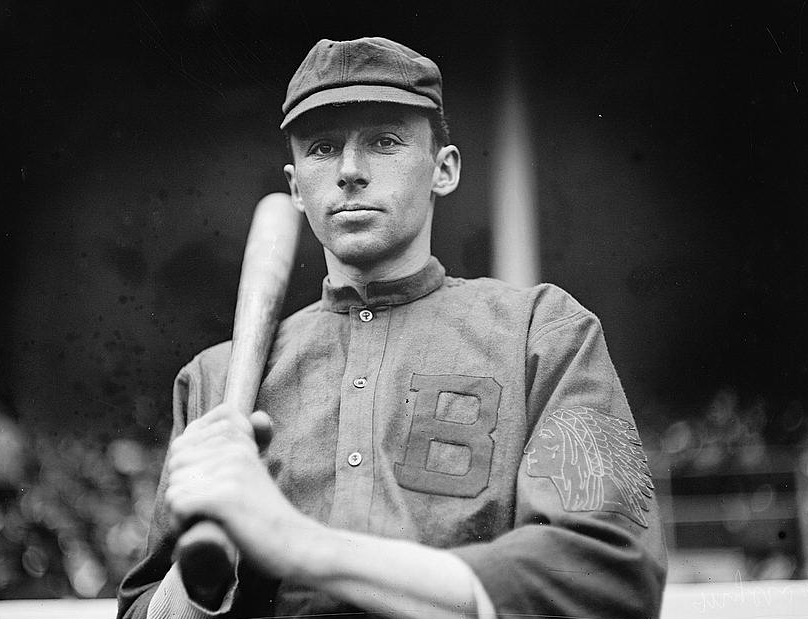
- First baseman
- Born: April 8, 1887; San Francisco, California, U.S.
- Died: June 30, 1967 (aged 80); San Francisco, California, U.S.
- Batted: Right Threw: Right

MLB debut
- April 16, 1910, for the Boston Red Sox

Last MLB appearance
- September 30, 1915, for the Brooklyn Tip-Tops

MLB statistics
- Hits: 335
- Batting average: .268
- Home runs: 4
- Stats at Baseball Reference

Teams
- Boston Red Sox (1910–1911); St. Louis Browns (1911); Boston Braves (1913); Brooklyn Tip-Tops (1914–1915)

Ralph Edward "Hap" Myers (April 8, 1887 – June 30, 1967) was an American Major League Baseball first baseman.

In five seasons, Myers played in 377 games and posted a .268 batting average (335-for-1251) with 203 runs, 4 home runs, 116 RBI, 132 stolen bases and 119 walks. Defensively, he recorded a .987 fielding percentage as a first baseman.
