= 1911 Philadelphia Athletics season =

1911 Philadelphia Athletics
- World Series champions American League champions
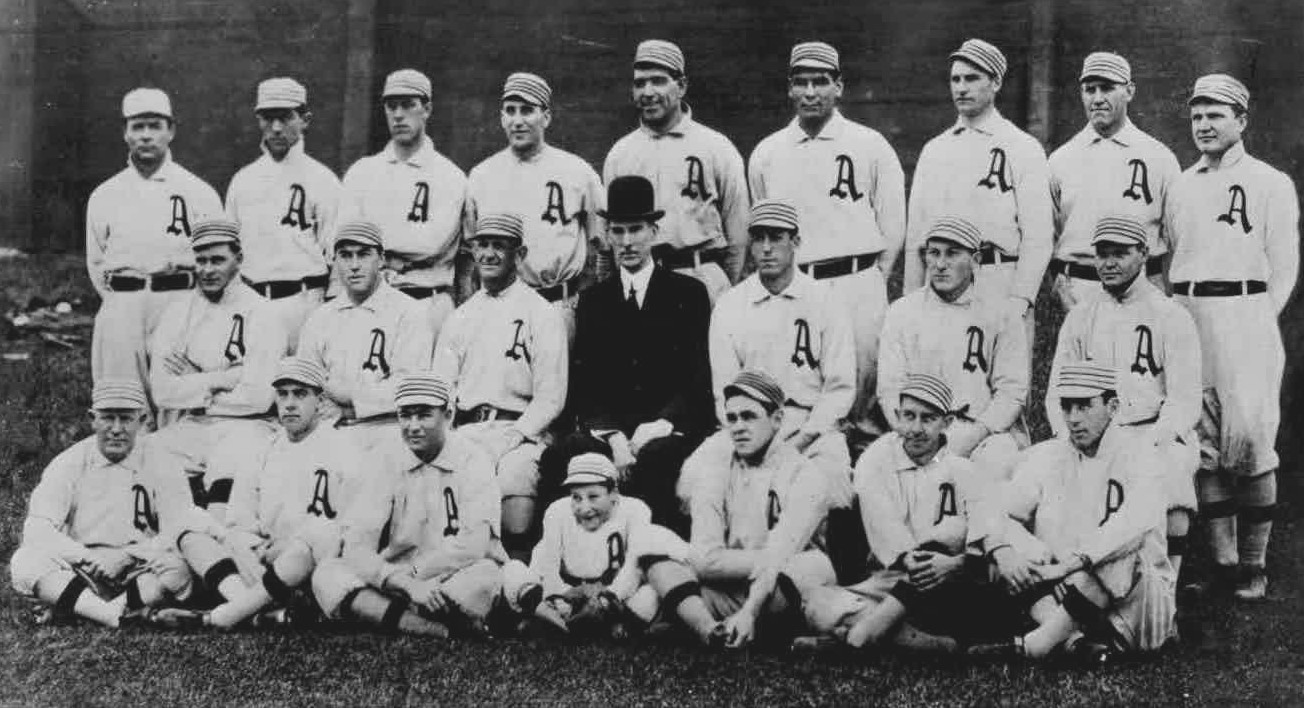
- League: American League
- Ballpark: Shibe Park
- City: Philadelphia
- Record: 101–50 (.669)
- League place: 1st
- Owners: Benjamin Shibe, Tom Shibe, John Shibe, Connie Mack, Sam Jones, Frank Hough
- Managers: Connie Mack

The 1911 Philadelphia Athletics season was a season in American baseball. The A's finished first in the American League with 101 wins and 50 losses. The team then defeated the New York Giants in the 1911 World Series, winning four games to two, and securing their second straight World Championship.

== History ==
Starting in 1911, the team was known for its "$100,000 infield," which consisted of John "Stuffy" McInnis (first base), Eddie Collins (second base), Jack Barry (shortstop), and Frank "Home Run" Baker (third base) as well as pitchers Eddie Plank and Charles "Chief" Bender.

== Regular season ==
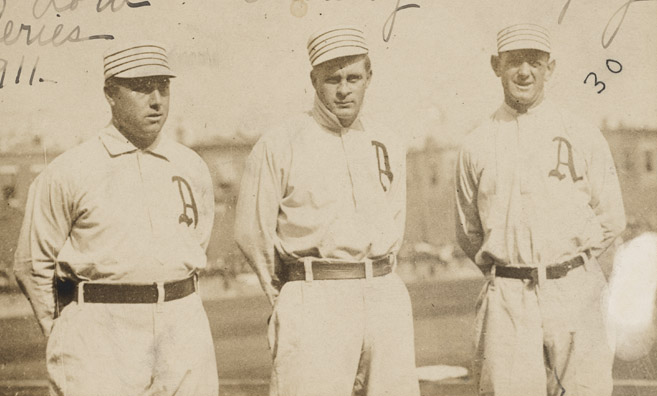
L to R: outfielders Bris Lord, Rube Oldring, and Danny Murphy in 1911.

=== Season standings ===
American League
Team	W	L	Pct.	GB	Home	Road
Philadelphia Athletics	101	50	.669	—	54‍–‍20	47‍–‍30
Detroit Tigers	89	65	.578	13½	51‍–‍25	38‍–‍40
Cleveland Naps	80	73	.523	22	46‍–‍30	34‍–‍43
Boston Red Sox	78	75	.510	24	39‍–‍37	39‍–‍38
Chicago White Sox	77	74	.510	24	40‍–‍37	37‍–‍37
New York Highlanders	76	76	.500	25½	36‍–‍40	40‍–‍36
Washington Senators	64	90	.416	38½	39‍–‍38	25‍–‍52
St. Louis Browns	45	107	.296	56½	25‍–‍53	20‍–‍54

=== Record vs. opponents ===
1911 American League record Sources:
Team	BOS	CWS	CLE	DET	NYH	PHA	SLB	WSH
Boston	—	11–11	11–11	10–12	12–10	9–13	12–9	13–9
Chicago	11–11	—	6–15–2	8–14	13–9	9–11–1	17–5	13–9
Cleveland	11–11	15–6–2	—	6–16	14–8–1	5–17	15–7	14–8
Detroit	12–10	14–8	16–6	—	7–15	12–10	14–8	14–8
New York	10–12	9–13	8–14–1	15–7	—	6–15	16–5	12–10
Philadelphia	13–9	11–9–1	17–5	10–12	15–6	—	20–2	15–7
St. Louis	9–12	5–17	7–15	8–14	5–16	2–20	—	9–13
Washington	9–13	9–13	8–14	8–14	10–12	7–15	13–9	—

=== Roster ===
1911 Philadelphia Athletics
Roster
Pitchers: Howard Armstrong; Chief Bender; Boardwalk Brown; Allan Collamore; Jack Coombs; Dave Danforth; Harry Krause; Elmer Leonard; Lep Long; Doc Martin; Cy Morgan; Eddie Plank; Lefty Russell	Catchers: Jack Lapp; Paddy Livingston; Ira Thomas; Infielders: Frank Baker; Jack Barry; Eddie Collins; Harry Davis; Claud Derrick; Earle Mack; Stuffy McInnis	Outfielders: Chester Emerson; Topsy Hartsel; Willie Hogan; Bris Lord; Danny Murphy; Rube Oldring; Amos Strunk	Manager: Connie Mack

== Player stats ==
=== Batting ===
==== Starters by position ====
Note: Pos = Position; G = Games played; AB = At bats; H = Hits; Avg. = Batting average; HR = Home runs; RBI = Runs batted in

Pos	Player	G	AB	H	Avg.	HR	RBI
C	Ira Thomas	103	297	81	.273	0	39
1B	Stuffy McInnis	126	468	150	.321	3	77
2B	Eddie Collins	132	493	180	.365	3	73
3B	Frank Baker	148	592	198	.334	11	115
SS	Jack Barry	127	442	117	.265	1	63
OF	Bris Lord	134	574	178	.310	3	55
OF	Rube Oldring	121	495	147	.297	3	59
OF	Danny Murphy	141	508	167	.329	6	66

==== Other batters ====
Note: G = Games played; AB = At bats; H = Hits; Avg. = Batting average; HR = Home runs; RBI = Runs batted in

Player	G	AB	H	Avg.	HR	RBI
Amos Strunk	74	215	55	.256	1	21
Harry Davis	57	183	36	.197	1	22
Jack Lapp	68	167	59	.353	1	26
Claud Derrick	36	100	23	.230	0	5
Paddy Livingston	27	71	17	.239	0	8
Topsy Hartsel	25	38	9	.237	0	1
Willie Hogan	7	19	2	.105	0	2
Chester Emerson	7	18	4	.222	0	0
Earle Mack	2	4	0	.000	0	0

=== Pitching ===
==== Starting pitchers ====
Note: G = Games pitched; IP = Innings pitched; W = Wins; L = Losses; ERA = Earned run average; SO = Strikeouts

Player	G	IP	W	L	ERA	SO
Jack Coombs	47	336.2	28	12	3.53	185
Eddie Plank	40	256.2	23	8	2.10	149
Cy Morgan	38	249.2	15	7	2.70	136
Chief Bender	31	216.1	17	5	2.16	114
Harry Krause	27	169.0	11	8	3.04	85

==== Other pitchers ====
Note: G = Games pitched; IP = Innings pitched; W = Wins; L = Losses; ERA = Earned run average; SO = Strikeouts

Player	G	IP	W	L	ERA	SO
Doc Martin	11	38.0	1	1	4.50	21
Dave Danforth	14	33.2	4	1	3.74	21
Lefty Russell	7	31.2	0	3	7.67	7
Elmer Leonard	5	19.0	2	2	2.84	10
Boardwalk Brown	2	12.0	0	1	4.50	6

==== Relief pitchers ====
Note: G = Games pitched; W = Wins; L = Losses; SV = Saves; ERA = Earned run average; SO = Strikeouts

Player	G	W	L	SV	ERA	SO
Dave Danforth	14	4	1	1	3.74	21
Allan Collamore	2	0	1	0	36.00	1
Howard Armstrong	1	0	1	0	0.00	0

== 1911 World Series ==
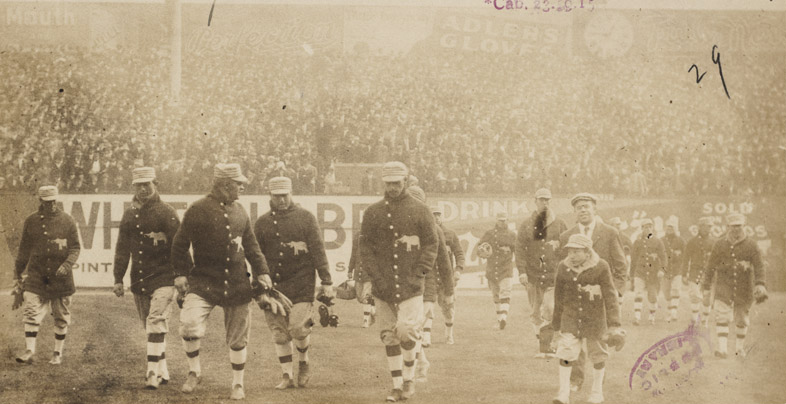
Philadelphia Athletics on field at the Polo Grounds, 1911 World Series

AL Philadelphia Athletics (4) vs. NL New York Giants (2)

Game	Score	Date	Location	Attendance
1	Athletics – 1, Giants – 2	October 14	Polo Grounds	38,281
2	Giants – 1, Athletics – 3	October 16	Shibe Park	26,286
3	Athletics – 3, Giants – 2 (11 innings)	October 17	Polo Grounds	37,216
4	Giants – 2, Athletics – 4	October 24	Shibe Park	24,355
5	Athletics – 3, Giants – 4 (10 innings)	October 25	Polo Grounds	33,228
6	Giants – 2, Athletics – 13	October 26	Shibe Park	20,485
