= 1915 San Francisco Seals season =

1915 San Francisco Seals
- League: Pacific Coast League
- Ballpark: Recreation Park
- City: San Francisco
- Record: 118–89
- League place: 1st
- Managers: Harry Wolverton

The 1915 San Francisco Seals season was the 13th season in the history of the San Francisco Seals baseball team. The team won the Pacific Coast League (PCL) pennant with a 118–89 record. Harry Wolverton was the team's manager, and shortstop Roy Corhan was the team captain. The season ran from March 30 to October 24, 1915.

== Infielders ==
First baseman Harry Heilmann appeared in 98 games and led the team, and ranked second in the PCL, with a .365 batting average. He appeared in only one game after July 26 due to illness. Heilmann later won four American League batting crowns and was inducted into the Baseball Hall of Fame. During Heilmann's illness, Paul "Molly" Meloan played 55 games at first base for the Seals.

Second baseman Red Downs appeared in 182 games and compiled a .282 batting average. Defensively, he led the PCL's second basemen with 519 putouts and ranked fifth with 517 assists and third with 46 errors. Bill Leard also appeared in 67 games at second base for the Seals.

Shortstop Roy Corhan appeared in 185 games and compiled a .276 batting average. Defensively, he led the PCL's shortstops with 433 putouts and 83 errors and ranked third with 715 assists.

Third baseman Bob Jones appeared in 191 games and compiled a .277 batting average. Defensively, he led the PCL's third basemen with 224 putouts, 335 assists, and 48 errors.

Catcher Walter Schmidt appeared in 127 games and compiled a .245 batting average. He was also one of the best defensive catchers in the PCL with 504 putouts, 159 assists, and 12 errors for a .982 fielding percentage. Also sharing the catching duties were Lou Sepulveda (68 games) and George Block (57 games).

== Outfielders ==
Left fielder Biff Schaller appeared in 208 games, compiled a .301 batting average, and led the PCL with 20 home runs. Defensively, he tallied 441 putouts, 20 assists, 21 errors, and a .957 fielding percentage.

Center fielder Ping Bodie appeared in 192 games, compiled a .325 batting average and .485 slugging percentage, led the team with 232 hits and 52 doubles, and ranked second in the PCL with 19 home runs. He was also one of the best defensive outfielders in the PCL with 410 putouts, 29 assists, and 13 errors for a .971 fielding percentage.

Mike Fitzgerald (.321 batting average, .957 fielding percentage in 169 games in the outfield) and Paul Meloan (.285 batting average, .959 fielding in 86 games in the outfield) shared the right field position.

== Pitchers ==
Spider Baum appeared in 55 games and compiled a 30–15 record and 2.45 earned run average (ERA) with 153 strikeouts.

Charles Fanning appeared in 58 games, ranked second in the PCL with 202 strikeouts, and compiled a 25–15 record and 2.65 ERA.

Charlie Smith appeared in 47 games and compiled a 17–8 record with a 3.09 ERA and 66 strikeouts.

== 1915 PCL standings ==
Team	W	L	Pct.	GB
San Francisco Seals	118	89	.570	--
Salt Lake City Bees	108	89	.548	5.0
Los Angeles Angels	110	98	.529	8.5
Venice/Vernon Tigers	102	104	.495	15.5
Oakland Oaks	93	113	.451	24.5
Portland Beavers	78	116	.402	33.5

== Statistics ==
=== Batting ===
Note: Pos = Position; G = Games played; AB = At bats; H = Hits; Avg. = Batting average; HR = Home runs; SLG = Slugging percentage

Pos	Player	G	AB	H	Avg.	HR	SLG
1B	Harry Heilmann	98	371	135	.364	12	.544
CF	Ping Bodie	192	720	234	.325	19	.485
RF	Mike Fitzgerald	169	697	224	.321	9	.426
LF	Biff Schaller	208	770	232	.301	20	.458
1B, RF	Paul Meloan	141	417	119	.285	11	.432
2B	Red Downs	182	642	181	.282	9	.393
3B	Bob Jones	192	674	187	.277	9	.369
SS	Roy Corhan	185	604	167	.276	4	.358
C	Walter Schmidt	127	416	102	.245	2	.293
C	Lou Sepulveda	68	160	38	.238	0	.256
C	George Block	58	164	37	.226	0	.274
2B	Bill Leard	115	324	69	.213	1	.262

=== Pitching ===
Note: G = Games pitched; IP = Innings pitched; W = Wins; L = Losses; PCT = Win percentage; ERA = Earned run average; SO = Strikeouts

Player	G	IP	W	L	PCT	ERA	SO
Spider Baum	55	382.0	30	15	.667	2.45	153
Charles Fanning	58	364.0	25	15	.625	2.65	202
Charlie Smith	47	221.1	17	8	.680	3.09	66
Curly Brown	29	176.2	11	8	.579	2.75	91
Bill Steen	19	122.1	10	5	.667	1.54	64
Johnny Couch	21	91.1	6	5	.545	2.66	34
Pug Cavet	18	94.1	5	6	.455	4.29	28
Bugs Reisigl	27	147.0	4	10	.286	3.80	51
