= 1911 New York Highlanders season =

Baseball team season

1911 New York Highlanders
- League: American League
- Ballpark: Hilltop Park
- City: New York City, New York
- Record: 76–76 (.500)
- League place: 6th
- Owners: William Devery and Frank Farrell
- Managers: Hal Chase

The 1911 New York Highlanders season saw the team finishing with a total of 76 wins and 76 losses, coming in sixth in the American League.

New York was managed by Hal Chase. Home games were played at Hilltop Park. The alternate and equally unofficial nickname, "Yankees", was being used more and more frequently by the press.

== Regular season ==
Relations between the New York Highlanders and the enemy New York Giants seemed to be at a boiling point until a fateful April day when a fire destroyed the main portion of the grandstand at the Polo Grounds, the Giants' home field just a few blocks away (and downhill) from the Hilltop. The Highlanders invited the Giants to play at Hilltop Park for the remainder of the 1911 season. Although the Giants were able to return to their partially rebuilt home two months later, this good deed would be remembered and returned to the Highlanders two years later.

=== Season standings ===
American League
| Team | W | L | Pct. | GB | Home | Road |
|---|---|---|---|---|---|---|
| Philadelphia Athletics | 101 | 50 | .669 | — | 54‍–‍20 | 47‍–‍30 |
| Detroit Tigers | 89 | 65 | .578 | 13½ | 51‍–‍25 | 38‍–‍40 |
| Cleveland Naps | 80 | 73 | .523 | 22 | 46‍–‍30 | 34‍–‍43 |
| Boston Red Sox | 78 | 75 | .510 | 24 | 39‍–‍37 | 39‍–‍38 |
| Chicago White Sox | 77 | 74 | .510 | 24 | 40‍–‍37 | 37‍–‍37 |
| New York Highlanders | 76 | 76 | .500 | 25½ | 36‍–‍40 | 40‍–‍36 |
| Washington Senators | 64 | 90 | .416 | 38½ | 39‍–‍38 | 25‍–‍52 |
| St. Louis Browns | 45 | 107 | .296 | 56½ | 25‍–‍53 | 20‍–‍54 |

=== Record vs. opponents ===
1911 American League record Sources:
| Team | BOS | CWS | CLE | DET | NYH | PHA | SLB | WSH |
|---|---|---|---|---|---|---|---|---|
| Boston | — | 11–11 | 11–11 | 10–12 | 12–10 | 9–13 | 12–9 | 13–9 |
| Chicago | 11–11 | — | 6–15–2 | 8–14 | 13–9 | 9–11–1 | 17–5 | 13–9 |
| Cleveland | 11–11 | 15–6–2 | — | 6–16 | 14–8–1 | 5–17 | 15–7 | 14–8 |
| Detroit | 12–10 | 14–8 | 16–6 | — | 7–15 | 12–10 | 14–8 | 14–8 |
| New York | 10–12 | 9–13 | 8–14–1 | 15–7 | — | 6–15 | 16–5 | 12–10 |
| Philadelphia | 13–9 | 11–9–1 | 17–5 | 10–12 | 15–6 | — | 20–2 | 15–7 |
| St. Louis | 9–12 | 5–17 | 7–15 | 8–14 | 5–16 | 2–20 | — | 9–13 |
| Washington | 9–13 | 9–13 | 8–14 | 8–14 | 10–12 | 7–15 | 13–9 | — |

=== Roster ===
1911 New York Highlanders
Roster
| Pitchers: Harry Ables; King Brockett; Ray Caldwell; Andy Coakley; Ray Fisher; Russ Ford; Chet Hoff; Ed Klepfer; Jack Quinn; Hippo Vaughn; Jack Warhop | Catchers: Walter Blair; Ed Sweeney; Joe Walsh; Bob Williams; Infielders: Hal Chase; Jim Curry; Cozy Dolan; Earle Gardner; Roy Hartzell; Otis Johnson; John Knight; Stubby Magner; Johnny Priest; Roxey Roach | Outfielders: Bill Bailey; Birdie Cree; Bert Daniels; Gene Elliott; Mike Fitzgerald; Mike Handiboe; Charlie Hemphill; Ed Wilkinson; Harry Wolter; Guy Zinn | Manager: Hal Chase; Coaches: Duke Farrell |

== Player stats ==
=== Batting ===
==== Starters by position ====
Note: Pos = Position; G = Games played; AB = At bats; H = Hits; Avg. = Batting average; HR = Home runs; RBI = Runs batted in

| Pos | Player | G | AB | H | Avg. | HR | RBI |
|---|---|---|---|---|---|---|---|
| C | Ed Sweeney | 83 | 229 | 53 | .231 | 0 | 18 |
| 1B | Hal Chase | 133 | 527 | 166 | .315 | 3 | 62 |
| 2B | Earle Gardner | 102 | 357 | 94 | .263 | 0 | 39 |
| SS | John Knight | 132 | 470 | 126 | .268 | 3 | 62 |
| 3B | Roy Hartzell | 144 | 527 | 156 | .296 | 3 | 91 |
| OF | Birdie Cree | 137 | 520 | 181 | .348 | 4 | 88 |
| OF | Bert Daniels | 131 | 462 | 132 | .286 | 2 | 31 |
| OF | Harry Wolter | 122 | 434 | 132 | .304 | 4 | 36 |

==== Other batters ====
Note: G = Games played; AB = At bats; H = Hits; Avg. = Batting average; HR = Home runs; RBI = Runs batted in

| Player | G | AB | H | Avg. | HR | RBI |
|---|---|---|---|---|---|---|
| Walter Blair | 85 | 222 | 43 | .194 | 0 | 26 |
| Otis Johnson | 71 | 209 | 49 | .234 | 3 | 36 |
| Charlie Hemphill | 69 | 201 | 57 | .284 | 1 | 15 |
| Cozy Dolan | 19 | 69 | 21 | .304 | 0 | 6 |
| Bob Williams | 20 | 47 | 9 | .191 | 0 | 8 |
| Roxey Roach | 13 | 40 | 10 | .250 | 0 | 2 |
| Mike Fitzgerald | 16 | 37 | 10 | .270 | 0 | 6 |
| Stubby Magner | 13 | 33 | 7 | .212 | 0 | 4 |
| Guy Zinn | 9 | 27 | 4 | .148 | 0 | 1 |
| Johnny Priest | 8 | 21 | 3 | .143 | 0 | 2 |
| Mike Handiboe | 5 | 15 | 1 | .067 | 0 | 0 |
| Gene Elliott | 5 | 13 | 1 | .077 | 0 | 1 |
| Ed Wilkinson | 10 | 13 | 3 | .231 | 0 | 1 |
| Jim Curry | 4 | 11 | 2 | .182 | 0 | 0 |
| Joe Walsh | 4 | 9 | 2 | .222 | 0 | 0 |
| Bill Bailey | 5 | 9 | 1 | .111 | 0 | 0 |

=== Pitching ===
==== Starting pitchers ====
Note: G = Games pitched; IP = Innings pitched; W = Wins; L = Losses; ERA = Earned run average; SO = Strikeouts

| Player | G | IP | W | L | ERA | SO |
|---|---|---|---|---|---|---|
| Russ Ford | 37 | 281.1 | 22 | 11 | 2.27 | 158 |
| Ray Caldwell | 41 | 255.0 | 14 | 14 | 3.35 | 145 |
| Jack Warhop | 31 | 209.2 | 12 | 13 | 4.16 | 71 |
| Ray Fisher | 29 | 171.2 | 10 | 11 | 3.25 | 99 |
| Hippo Vaughn | 26 | 145.2 | 8 | 10 | 4.39 | 74 |

==== Other pitchers ====
Note: G = Games pitched; IP = Innings pitched; W = Wins; L = Losses; ERA = Earned run average; SO = Strikeouts

| Player | G | IP | W | L | ERA | SO |
|---|---|---|---|---|---|---|
| Jack Quinn | 40 | 174.2 | 8 | 10 | 3.76 | 71 |
| King Brockett | 16 | 75.1 | 2 | 4 | 4.66 | 25 |
| Red Hoff | 5 | 20.2 | 0 | 1 | 2.18 | 10 |
| Andy Coakley | 2 | 11.2 | 0 | 1 | 5.40 | 4 |
| Harry Ables | 3 | 11.0 | 0 | 1 | 9.82 | 6 |

==== Relief pitchers ====
Note: G = Games pitched; W = Wins; L = Losses; SV = Saves; ERA = Earned run average; SO = Strikeouts

| Player | G | W | L | SV | ERA | SO |
|---|---|---|---|---|---|---|
| Ed Klepfer | 2 | 0 | 0 | 0 | 6.75 | 4 |
