= 1911 Detroit Tigers season =

Major League Baseball season

1911 Detroit Tigers
- League: American League
- Ballpark: Bennett Park
- City: Detroit, Michigan
- Record: 89–65 (.578)
- League place: 2nd
- Owners: William H. Yawkey and Frank Navin
- Managers: Hughie Jennings

The 1911 Detroit Tigers had a record of 89–65 and finished in second place in the American League, 13 1/2 games behind the Philadelphia Athletics. They outscored their opponents 831–776, and drew 484,988 fans to Bennett Park (4th of 8 teams in attendance).

== Regular season ==
=== Season summary ===
The 1911 Detroit Tigers opened the season with a phenomenal 21–2 record. The Tigers set the modern record for home wins to start the season, 12–0, and were 51–25 at home but 38–40 on the road. They were in first place in the American League every day except one until August 3, 1911. After going 59–24, the wheels fell off as the team lost 20 of 30 games in July and were 23–43 in the second half. The Tigers lost 20 of 30 games in July and ended up 13 1/2 games behind the Athletics.

The 1911 Tigers had two of the best batters in baseball in Ty Cobb and Sam Crawford. Cobb led both leagues in batting average (.420), RBIs (127), stolen bases (83), slugging (.621), runs (147), hits (248), total bases (367), doubles (47), and extra base hits (79). Crawford was not far behind, ranking in the top three in the AL in batting average (.378), slugging (.438), hits (217), total bases (302), and RBIs (115).

The team ranked second best in the American League in runs scored but the pitching staff's earned run average of 3.73 was the second worst in the league—a full point above the league leading Red Sox' team ERA of 2.74. Playing in Bennett Field, with its 8,500-seat wooden grandstand, their home attendance for the entire season was 484,988.

=== Season standings ===
American League
Team	W	L	Pct.	GB	Home	Road
Philadelphia Athletics	101	50	.669	—	54‍–‍20	47‍–‍30
Detroit Tigers	89	65	.578	13½	51‍–‍25	38‍–‍40
Cleveland Naps	80	73	.523	22	46‍–‍30	34‍–‍43
Boston Red Sox	78	75	.510	24	39‍–‍37	39‍–‍38
Chicago White Sox	77	74	.510	24	40‍–‍37	37‍–‍37
New York Highlanders	76	76	.500	25½	36‍–‍40	40‍–‍36
Washington Senators	64	90	.416	38½	39‍–‍38	25‍–‍52
St. Louis Browns	45	107	.296	56½	25‍–‍53	20‍–‍54

=== Record vs. opponents ===
1911 American League record Sources:
Team	BOS	CWS	CLE	DET	NYH	PHA	SLB	WSH
Boston	—	11–11	11–11	10–12	12–10	9–13	12–9	13–9
Chicago	11–11	—	6–15–2	8–14	13–9	9–11–1	17–5	13–9
Cleveland	11–11	15–6–2	—	6–16	14–8–1	5–17	15–7	14–8
Detroit	12–10	14–8	16–6	—	7–15	12–10	14–8	14–8
New York	10–12	9–13	8–14–1	15–7	—	6–15	16–5	12–10
Philadelphia	13–9	11–9–1	17–5	10–12	15–6	—	20–2	15–7
St. Louis	9–12	5–17	7–15	8–14	5–16	2–20	—	9–13
Washington	9–13	9–13	8–14	8–14	10–12	7–15	13–9	—

=== Roster ===
1911 Detroit Tigers
Roster
Pitchers: Pug Cavet; Tex Covington; Bill Donovan; Ed Lafitte; Jack Lively; Clarence Mitchell; George Mullin; Ed Summers; Wiley Taylor; Ed Willett; Ralph Works	Catchers: Joe Casey; Boss Schmidt; Oscar Stanage; George F. Wilson; Infielders: Paddy Baumann; Donie Bush; Jim Delahanty; Del Gainer; Chick Lathers; George Moriarty; Jack Ness; Charley O'Leary; Guy Tutwiler	Outfielders: Ty Cobb; Sam Crawford; Delos Drake; Davy Jones; Biff Schaller	Manager: Hughie Jennings; Coaches: Deacon McGuire

=== Season chronology ===
- April 13: The Tigers beat the White Sox, 4–2, on Opening Day at Bennett Park. George Mullin was the Opening Day starter for Detroit.
- April 18: The Tigers beat Cleveland, 5–1, as Ty Cobb stole home on a double steal in the first inning. George Mullin won his second game of the year.
- April 20: The Tigers beat the White Sox, 6–3, to open the season with six consecutive wins.
- April 28: The Tigers beat Cleveland, 5–3, for their 12th win against only one defeat to that point in the season.
- May 1: The Tigers beat Cleveland, 14–5. Ty Cobb stole home for the second time in less than a month off Cleveland pitcher George Kahler.
- May 7: The Tigers beat the White Sox, 5–4, as Ty Cobb went 4-for-5.
- May 9: The Tigers beat New York, 10–0, as Ralph Works pitched his second shutout of the season. Off to a scorching hot start, the Tigers were 21–2 at that point.
- May 10: The Tigers lost their first game at Bennett Park in 1911, a 6–2 loss to New York. The Tigers had a 21–2 record and would lead the American League until July 4.
- May 12: The Tigers beat the Yankees, 6–5. Ty Cobb scored a run from first base on a short single to right‚ scored from second base on a wild pitch‚ then doubled home two runs in the 7th inning to tie the game. When New York catcher Ed Sweeney argued the call at the plate‚ the rest of the infield gathered‚ leaving Cobb unattended at second base. With no time out called‚ Cobb strolled to third base‚ and then walked in to observe the continuing argument. When he spotted an opening in the circle of players‚ he slid in with the winning run.
- May 13: After taking a 10–1 lead, the Tigers lost to the Red Sox, 13–11, in 10 innings. Ty Cobb hit the first grand slam of his career in the third inning grand slam.
- May 15: The Tigers beat the Red Sox, 5–4. Ty Cobb drew an intentional walk in the 10th inning, and Jim Delahanty drove him in for the win. Cobb began a 40-game hit streak.
- May 19: The Tigers beat the A's, 9–8. Detroit pitcher Jack Lively was hit in the head with pitch in the second inning, but woozily continued for several innings. Ty Cobb had a triple, scored two runs, and started a double play from center field. Oscar Stanage hit a home run in the 8th inning to win it.
- May 20: The Tigers lost to the A's, 14–12. Ty Cobb went 3-for-4. In the 1st inning, Detroit's promising young first baseman, Del Gainer broke his wrist when he was hit by a pitch. He would not play again until September. His replacement Jack Ness started a 1–6 triple play to Donie Bush.
- May 23: The Tigers beat the Senators and Walter Johnson‚ 9–8. Johnson walked Ty Cobb with the bases loaded in the 8th inning for the winning run. Cobb was 3-for-4 with 3 stolen bases in the game.
- June 3: The Tigers again beat the Senators and Walter Johnson, 7–2. Ty Cobb had three hits, including two triples.
- June 18: After falling behind, 13–1, the Tigers staged the biggest comeback in MLB history, defeating the White Sox, 16–15. Ty Cobb had four hits and five RBIs and scored the game-winning run in the 9th inning on an RBI double by Sam Crawford.
- June 19: The Tigers beat the White Sox, 8–5, as Ty Cobb scored from first on a single and tied the AL record by getting a hit in his 29th straight game.
- June 20: Ty Cobb broke the AL record by getting a hit in his 30th straight game. The Tigers beat Cleveland, 8–3, as Cobb also stole two bases.
- July 1: The Tigers shut out the Browns, 8–0, behind the pitching of Ed Willett. Ty Cobb beat out a ground ball for an infield single to extend his hit streak to 39 games.
- July 2: The Tigers beat Cleveland, 14–6, as Ty Cobb had three hits and three runs to extend his hitting streak to 40 games.
- July 4: Ty Cobb's 40-game hitting streak ended in a 7–3 loss to the White Sox. Cobb hit .491 during his 40-game streak began on May 15.
- July 12: The Tigers shut out the A's, 9–0, behind pitcher "Wild Bill" Donovan. Ty Cobb walked‚ then stole second, third and home on consecutive pitches off Harry Krause. Sam Crawford added a home run in the third inning. After Cobb reached on a fielder's choice in the 3rd‚ Sam Crawford homered. In the 7th inning‚ Cobb walked‚ advanced to second on a bunt‚ and scored on a sacrifice fly‚ knocking the ball out of the hands of catcher Paddy Livingston.
- July 13: The Tigers edged the A's, 8–7, to remain in first place in the AL. With the score tied 7–7, Ty Cobb scored from first in the 9th inning on a single by Jim Delahanty. Cobb ran through Hughie Jennings' hold sign at third base and used his fadeaway slide to elude the tag at the plate.
- August 3: The Tigers lost, 3–2, to the Red Sox. "Wild Bill" Donovan was the losing pitcher. With the loss, the Tigers dropped into second place behind the A's. The Tigers had been in first place all but one day up to that point in the season, but the A's would pull away and win the pennant by 13 points.
- August 10: The Tigers announced plans to build a new $300,000 grandstand in the off-season. At the beginning of the 1912 season, Bennett Park would be renamed Navin Field.
- August 13: Ty Cobb‚ having reportedly concluded that the Tigers could not catch up with the A's in the pennant race, began a vacation.
- August 18: The Tigers beat the Red Sox‚ 9–4. Ty Cobb stole home in the first inning on the front end of a triple steal with Jim Delahanty and Delos Drake.
- August 29: The Tigers bet the A's, 9–8, in 11 innings. Detroit third baseman Jim Delahanty set an MLB record by making an unassisted double play for the second day in a row. Marv Owen was the next to do it, in 1934.
- September 9: The Tigers shut out the White Sox, 1–0, behind pitcher George Mullin. Left fielder Delos Drake started a triple play, making the catch, throwing to Donie Bush who relayed to first baseman Del Gainer.
- September 26: The A's clinched the pennant with an 11–5 win over the Tigers. "Home Run" Baker had a home run and two doubles. The Tigers had led by 12 games in May, but finished in second place, 13 1/2 games behind the A's.
- September 29: Ty Cobb was fined $100 for playing a Sunday game with a semipro club in New York.
- October 4: The Tigers beat Cleveland, 2–0, as George Mullin threw his second shutout in less than a month.
- October 7: The Tigers shut out the Browns, 1–0, behind the pitching of Ralph Works. With inclement weather in St. Louis, the game was played in front of a crowd of 66 fans.
- October 11: With the World Series starting on October 14, the A's played an American League All Star team. Ty Cobb had three hits for the All Stars. On that day, Cobb was also announced as the winner of the first American League Most Valuable Player award. Cobb received a Chalmers automobile for the award.

== Player stats ==
=== Batting ===
==== Starters by position ====
Note: Pos = Position; G = Games played; AB = At bats; H = Hits; Avg. = Batting average; HR = Home runs; RBI = Runs batted in

Pos	Player	G	AB	H	Avg.	HR	RBI
C	Oscar Stanage	141	503	133	.264	3	51
1B	Jim Delahanty	144	542	184	.339	3	94
2B	Charley O'Leary	74	256	68	.266	0	25
3B	George Moriarty	130	478	116	.243	1	60
SS	Donie Bush	150	561	130	.232	1	36
OF	Ty Cobb	146	591	248	.420	8	127
OF	Sam Crawford	146	574	217	.378	7	115
OF	Davy Jones	98	341	93	.273	0	19

==== Other batters ====
Note: G = Games played; AB = At bats; H = Hits; Avg. = Batting average; HR = Home runs; RBI = Runs batted in

Player	G	AB	H	Avg.	HR	RBI
Delos Drake	95	315	88	.279	1	36
Del Gainer	70	248	75	.302	2	25
Paddy Baumann	26	94	24	.255	0	11
Biff Schaller	40	60	8	.133	1	7
Boss Schmidt	28	46	13	.283	0	2
Chick Lathers	29	45	10	.222	0	4
Jack Ness	12	39	6	.154	0	2
Joe Casey	15	33	5	.152	0	3
Guy Tutwiler	13	32	6	.188	0	3
Chick Lathers	5	16	3	.188	0	0

Note: pitchers' batting statistics not included

=== Pitching ===
==== Starting pitchers ====
Note: G = Games pitched; IP = Innings pitched; W = Wins; L = Losses; ERA = Earned run average; SO = Strikeouts

Player	G	IP	W	L	ERA	SO
George Mullin	30	234.1	18	10	3.07	87
Ed Willett	38	231.1	13	14	3.66	86
Ed Summers	30	179.1	11	11	3.66	65
Ed Lafitte	29	172.1	11	8	3.92	63
Bill Donovan	20	168.1	10	9	3.31	81
Jack Lively	18	113.2	7	5	4.59	45
Pug Cavet	1	4.0	0	0	4.50	1

==== Other pitchers ====
Note: G = Games pitched; IP = Innings pitched; W = Wins; L = Losses; ERA = Earned run average; SO = Strikeouts

Player	G	IP	W	L	ERA	SO
Ralph Works	30	167.1	11	5	3.87	68
Tex Covington	17	83.2	7	1	4.09	29
Wiley Taylor	3	19.0	0	2	3.79	9
Clarence Mitchell	5	14.1	1	0	8.16	4

== Awards and honors ==
=== League top five finishers ===
Donie Bush

- AL leader in bases on balls (98)
- AL leader in outs (461)
- #2 in AL in runs scored (126)
- #2 in AL in plate appearances (692)
- #5 in AL in sacrifice hits (30)

Ty Cobb

- MLB batting crown (.420)
- MLB leader in RBIs (127)
- MLB leader in stolen bases (83)
- MLB leader in slugging percentage (.621)
- MLB leader in OPS (1.088)
- MLB leader in runs (147)
- MLB leader in hits (248)
- MLB leader in total bases (367)
- MLB leader in doubles (47)
- MLB leader in extra base hits (79)
- MLB leader in times on base (300)
- MLB leader in singles (169)
- MLB leader in runs created (169)
- AL leader in triples (24)
- #2 in MLB in on-base percentage (.467)
- #2 in AL in home runs (8)
- #2 in Power/Speed Number (14.6)
- #4 in AL in at bats per home run (73.9)

Sam Crawford

- #3 in AL in batting average (.378)
- #4 in AL in on-base percentage (.438)
- #3 in AL in slugging percentage (.526)
- #3 in AL in OPS (.964)
- #4 in AL in runs scored (109)
- #3 in AL in hits (217)
- #3 in AL in total bases (302)
- #3 in AL in home runs (7)
- #2 in AL in RBIs (115)
- #3 in AL in singles (160)
- #3 in AL in runs created (143)
- #4 in AL in extra base hits (57)
- #3 in AL in times on base (278)
- #5 in AL in Power/Speed Number (11.8)

George Mullin

- #5 in AL in complete games (25)
- #4 in AL in home runs allowed (7)

Ed Willett

- #4 in AL in hit batsmen (14)
- #5 in AL in hits allowed (261)
- #5 in AL in earned runs allowed (94)

Ralph Works

- #5 in AL in win percentage (.688)

=== Players ranking among top 100 of all time at position ===
The following members of the 1911 Detroit Tigers are among the Top 100 players of all time at their position, as ranked in The New Bill James Historical Baseball Abstract in 2001:

- Donie Bush: 51st best shortstop of all time
- Ty Cobb: 2nd best center fielder of all time
- Sam Crawford: 10th best right fielder of all time
