= 1911 Chicago White Sox season =

1911 Chicago White Sox
- League: American League
- Ballpark: White Sox Park
- City: Chicago, Illinois
- Record: 77–74 (.510)
- League place: 5th
- Owners: Charles Comiskey
- Managers: Hugh Duffy

== Regular season ==
=== Season standings ===
American League
Team	W	L	Pct.	GB	Home	Road
Philadelphia Athletics	101	50	.669	—	54‍–‍20	47‍–‍30
Detroit Tigers	89	65	.578	13½	51‍–‍25	38‍–‍40
Cleveland Naps	80	73	.523	22	46‍–‍30	34‍–‍43
Boston Red Sox	78	75	.510	24	39‍–‍37	39‍–‍38
Chicago White Sox	77	74	.510	24	40‍–‍37	37‍–‍37
New York Highlanders	76	76	.500	25½	36‍–‍40	40‍–‍36
Washington Senators	64	90	.416	38½	39‍–‍38	25‍–‍52
St. Louis Browns	45	107	.296	56½	25‍–‍53	20‍–‍54

=== Record vs. opponents ===
1911 American League record Sources:
Team	BOS	CWS	CLE	DET	NYH	PHA	SLB	WSH
Boston	—	11–11	11–11	10–12	12–10	9–13	12–9	13–9
Chicago	11–11	—	6–15–2	8–14	13–9	9–11–1	17–5	13–9
Cleveland	11–11	15–6–2	—	6–16	14–8–1	5–17	15–7	14–8
Detroit	12–10	14–8	16–6	—	7–15	12–10	14–8	14–8
New York	10–12	9–13	8–14–1	15–7	—	6–15	16–5	12–10
Philadelphia	13–9	11–9–1	17–5	10–12	15–6	—	20–2	15–7
St. Louis	9–12	5–17	7–15	8–14	5–16	2–20	—	9–13
Washington	9–13	9–13	8–14	8–14	10–12	7–15	13–9	—

=== Roster ===
1911 Chicago White Sox
Roster
Pitchers: Jesse Baker; Joe Benz; Joe Hovlik; Frank Lange; George Mogridge; Fred Olmstead; Jim Scott; Ed Walsh; Doc White; Irv Young	Catchers: Bruno Block; Ralph Kreitz; Wally Mayer; Fred Payne; Billy Sullivan; Infielders: Marty Berghammer; Felix Chouinard; Shano Collins; Roy Corhan; Tex Jones; Harry Lord; Amby McConnell; Charlie Mullen; Freddy Parent; Lee Tannehill; Rollie Zeider	Outfielders: Cuke Barrows; Ping Bodie; Nixey Callahan; Patsy Dougherty; Jimmy Johnston; Matty McIntyre; Paul Meloan; Bobby Messenger	Manager: Hugh Duffy

== Player stats ==
=== Batting ===
==== Starters by position ====
Note: Pos = Position; G = Games played; AB = At bats; H = Hits; Avg. = Batting average; HR = Home runs; RBI = Runs batted in

Pos	Player	G	AB	H	Avg.	HR	RBI
C	Billy Sullivan	89	256	55	.215	0	31
1B	Shano Collins	106	370	97	.262	4	45
2B	Amby McConnell	104	396	111	.280	1	34
SS	Lee Tannehill	141	516	131	.254	0	49
3B	Harry Lord	141	561	180	.321	3	61
OF	Ping Bodie	145	551	159	.289	4	97
OF	Matty McIntyre	146	569	184	.323	1	52
OF	Nixey Callahan	120	466	131	.281	3	60

==== Other batters ====
Note: G = Games played; AB = At bats; H = Hits; Avg. = Batting average; HR = Home runs; RBI = Runs batted in

Player	G	AB	H	Avg.	HR	RBI
Rollie Zeider	73	217	55	.253	2	21
Patsy Dougherty	76	211	61	.289	0	32
Fred Payne	66	133	27	.203	1	19
Roy Corhan	43	131	28	.214	0	8
Bruno Block	39	115	35	.304	1	18
Charlie Mullen	20	59	12	.203	0	5
Cuke Barrows	13	46	9	.196	0	4
Tex Jones	9	31	6	.194	0	4
Bobby Messenger	13	17	2	.118	0	0
Felix Chouinard	14	17	3	.176	0	0
Ralph Kreitz	7	17	4	.235	0	0
Freddy Parent	3	9	4	.444	0	3
Marty Berghammer	2	5	0	.000	0	0
Wally Mayer	1	3	0	.000	0	0
Paul Meloan	1	3	1	.333	0	1
Jimmy Johnston	1	2	0	.000	0	2

=== Pitching ===
==== Starting pitchers ====
Note: G = Games pitched; IP = Innings pitched; W = Wins; L = Losses; ERA = Earned run average; SO = Strikeouts

Player	G	IP	W	L	ERA	SO
Ed Walsh	56	368.2	27	18	2.22	255
Jim Scott	39	222.0	14	11	2.39	128
Doc White	34	214.1	10	14	2.98	72
Frank Lange	29	161.2	8	8	3.23	104

==== Other pitchers ====
Note: G = Games pitched; IP = Innings pitched; W = Wins; L = Losses; ERA = Earned run average; SO = Strikeouts

Player	G	IP	W	L	ERA	SO
Fred Olmstead	25	117.2	6	6	4.21	45
Jesse Baker	22	94.0	2	7	3.93	51
Irv Young	24	92.2	5	6	4.37	40
Joe Benz	12	55.2	3	2	2.26	28
Joe Hovlik	12	47.0	2	0	3.06	24
George Mogridge	4	12.2	0	2	4.97	5
