= Howard Armstrong =

Howard Armstrong may refer to:

- Howard Armstrong (musician) (1909–2003), country blues musician
- Howard Armstrong (baseball) (1889–1926), baseball player
- Howard E. Armstrong (1903–1983), Vermont Secretary of State

== See also ==
- Edwin Howard Armstrong (1890–1954), American inventor
- Ernest Howard Armstrong (1864–1946), Canadian politician and journalist
