= 1911 Washington Senators season =

1911 Washington Senators
- League: American League
- Ballpark: National Park
- City: Washington, D.C.
- Record: 64–90 (.416)
- League place: 7th
- Owners: Thomas C. Noyes
- Managers: Jimmy McAleer

The 1911 Washington Senators won 64 games, lost 90, and finished in seventh place in the American League. They were managed by Jimmy McAleer and played home games at National Park.

== Regular season ==
=== Season standings ===
American League
Team	W	L	Pct.	GB	Home	Road
Philadelphia Athletics	101	50	.669	—	54‍–‍20	47‍–‍30
Detroit Tigers	89	65	.578	13½	51‍–‍25	38‍–‍40
Cleveland Naps	80	73	.523	22	46‍–‍30	34‍–‍43
Boston Red Sox	78	75	.510	24	39‍–‍37	39‍–‍38
Chicago White Sox	77	74	.510	24	40‍–‍37	37‍–‍37
New York Highlanders	76	76	.500	25½	36‍–‍40	40‍–‍36
Washington Senators	64	90	.416	38½	39‍–‍38	25‍–‍52
St. Louis Browns	45	107	.296	56½	25‍–‍53	20‍–‍54

=== Record vs. opponents ===
1911 American League record Sources:
Team	BOS	CWS	CLE	DET	NYH	PHA	SLB	WSH
Boston	—	11–11	11–11	10–12	12–10	9–13	12–9	13–9
Chicago	11–11	—	6–15–2	8–14	13–9	9–11–1	17–5	13–9
Cleveland	11–11	15–6–2	—	6–16	14–8–1	5–17	15–7	14–8
Detroit	12–10	14–8	16–6	—	7–15	12–10	14–8	14–8
New York	10–12	9–13	8–14–1	15–7	—	6–15	16–5	12–10
Philadelphia	13–9	11–9–1	17–5	10–12	15–6	—	20–2	15–7
St. Louis	9–12	5–17	7–15	8–14	5–16	2–20	—	9–13
Washington	9–13	9–13	8–14	8–14	10–12	7–15	13–9	—

=== Roster ===
1911 Washington Senators
Roster
Pitchers: Charlie Becker; Carl Cashion; Dolly Gray; Bob Groom; Walt Herrell; Tom Hughes; Walter Johnson; Bill Otey; Fred Sherry; Dixie Walker	Catchers: Eddie Ainsmith; John Henry; Gabby Street; Infielders: Wid Conroy; Bill Cunningham; Kid Elberfeld; George McBride; Ray Morgan; Germany Schaefer; Jock Somerlott	Outfielders: Charles Conway; Doc Gessler; Jack Lelivelt; Tom Long; Clyde Milan; Warren Miller; Tilly Walker; Other batters: Bull Smith	Manager: Jimmy McAleer

== Player stats ==
=== Batting ===
==== Starters by position ====
Note: Pos = Position; G = Games played; AB = At bats; H = Hits; Avg. = Batting average; HR = Home runs; RBI = Runs batted in

Pos	Player	G	AB	H	Avg.	HR	RBI
C	Gabby Street	72	216	48	.222	0	14
1B	Germany Schaefer	125	440	147	.334	0	45
2B	Bill Cunningham	94	331	63	.190	3	37
SS	George McBride	154	557	131	.235	0	59
3B	Wid Conroy	106	349	81	.232	2	28
OF	Tillie Walker	95	356	99	.278	2	39
OF	Doc Gessler	128	450	127	.282	4	78
OF	Clyde Milan	154	616	194	.315	3	35

==== Other batters ====
Note: G = Games played; AB = At bats; H = Hits; Avg. = Batting average; HR = Home runs; RBI = Runs batted in

Player	G	AB	H	Avg.	HR	RBI
Kid Elberfeld	127	404	110	.272	0	47
John Henry	85	261	53	.203	0	21
Jack Lelivelt	72	225	72	.320	0	22
Eddie Ainsmith	61	149	33	.221	0	14
Ray Morgan	25	89	19	.213	0	5
Tom Long	14	48	11	.229	0	5
Jock Somerlott	13	40	7	.175	0	2
Warren Miller	21	34	5	.147	0	0
Charles Conway	2	3	1	.333	0	0

=== Pitching ===
==== Starting pitchers ====
Note: G = Games pitched; IP = Innings pitched; W = Wins; L = Losses; ERA = Earned run average; SO = Strikeouts

Player	G	IP	W	L	ERA	SO
Walter Johnson	40	322.1	25	13	1.90	207
Bob Groom	37	254.2	13	17	3.82	135
Tom Hughes	34	223.0	11	17	3.47	86
Dixie Walker	32	185.2	8	13	3.39	65
Carl Cashion	11	71.1	1	5	4.16	26

==== Other pitchers ====
Note: G = Games pitched; IP = Innings pitched; W = Wins; L = Losses; ERA = Earned run average; SO = Strikeouts

Player	G	IP	W	L	ERA	SO
Dolly Gray	28	121.0	2	13	5.06	42
Charlie Becker	11	71.1	3	5	4.04	31
Fred Sherry	10	52.1	0	4	4.30	20
Bill Otey	12	49.2	1	3	6.34	16

==== Relief pitchers ====
Note: G = Games pitched; W = Wins; L = Losses; SV = Saves; ERA = Earned run average; SO = Strikeouts

Player	G	W	L	SV	ERA	SO
Walt Herrell	1	0	0	0	18.00	0
