= Charles Conway =

American baseball player (1886-1968)

- Outfielder
- Born: April 28, 1886; Youngstown, Ohio, U.S.
- Died: September 12, 1968 (aged 82); Youngstown, Ohio, U.S.
- Batted: Right Threw: Right

MLB debut
- April 15, 1911, for the Washington Senators

Last MLB appearance
- April 18, 1911, for the Washington Senators

MLB statistics
- Games played: 2
- At bats: 3
- Hits: 1
- Stats at Baseball Reference

Teams
- Washington Senators (1911)

Charles Connell Conway (April 28, 1886 – September 12, 1968) was an American outfielder in Major League Baseball. He played for the Washington Senators in 1911.
