= Coalburg, Alabama =

Unincorporated community in Alabama, United States

- Unincorporated community
- Location within Alabama Location within the United States
- Coordinates: 33°35′37″N 86°51′26″W
- Country: United States
- State: Alabama
- County: Jefferson
- Elevation: 469 ft (143 m)
- Time zone: UTC−6 (Central (CST))
  - Summer (DST): UTC−5 (CDT)
- Area codes: 205, 659
- GNIS feature ID: 116311

Coalburg is an unincorporated community in Jefferson County, Alabama, United States.

== History ==
Coalburg was home to coal mines first developed by John T. Milner, who sold them in May 1883 to the Georgia Pacific Railway. Edward Magruder Tutwiler became the superintendent of the mines. Sloss-Sheffield Iron and Steel Company operated coke ovens at Coalburg during this time. At its peak, the Coalburg mines produced four thousand tons of coal per day. Overall, the Coalburg mines produced over 186,000 tons of coal. Sloss used convict labor to work in the Coalburg mines, with 320 men working in 1889. As the mines grew, the number of convicts used to work in the mines increased. The coal mined at and coke produced in Coalburg was sent to Sloss Furnaces in Birmingham to be turned into pig iron.

In 1890, eleven miners were killed in a mine explosion.

A post office was operated in Coalburg from 1883 until the 1980s.

== Demographics ==
Historical population
Census	Pop.	Note	%±
1890	842		—
U.S. Decennial Census

Coalburg was listed on the 1890 U.S. Census with a population of 842.

== Notable people ==
- Ed Sherling, Major League Baseball pinch hitter and pinch runner who played in 1924 with the Philadelphia Athletics
- Guy Tutwiler, first baseman who played two seasons with the Detroit Tigers (1911, 1913)
