= Ed Wilkinson =

American baseball player (1890-1918)

- Outfielder
- Born: June 20, 1890; Jacksonville, Oregon, U.S.
- Died: April 9, 1918 (aged 27); Tucson, Arizona, U.S.
- Batted: Right Threw: Right

MLB debut
- July 4, 1911, for the New York Highlanders

Last MLB appearance
- September 26, 1911, for the New York Highlanders

MLB statistics
- Batting average: .231
- Home runs: 0
- Runs batted in: 1
- Stats at Baseball Reference

Teams
- New York Highlanders (1911)

Edward Henry Wilkinson (June 20, 1890 – April 9, 1918) was an American Major League Baseball player. He was born in Jacksonville, Oregon and died in Tucson, Arizona. Wilkinson batted and threw right-handed.

Wilkinson played for the New York Highlanders in the 1911 season. In ten games, he had three hits in 13 at-bats, with one RBI, and a .231 batting average. Shortly thereafter, he contracted pulmonary tuberculosis, a condition that ended his career and contributed to his early death at the age of 27.
