= Doc Martin (baseball) =

American baseball player (1887-1935)

- Pitcher
- Born: September 23, 1887; Roxbury, Massachusetts, U.S.
- Died: April 14, 1935 (aged 47); Milton, Massachusetts, U.S.
- Batted: Right Threw: Right

MLB debut
- October 7, 1908, for the Philadelphia Athletics

Last MLB appearance
- June 5, 1912, for the Philadelphia Athletics

MLB statistics
- Win–loss record: 1-2
- Earned run average: 5.48
- Strikeouts: 27
- Stats at Baseball Reference

Teams
- Philadelphia Athletics (1908, 1911–1912)

Harold Winthrop Martin (September 23, 1887 – April 14, 1935) was an American Major League Baseball pitcher. He played for the Philadelphia Athletics during the 1908, 1911 and 1912 seasons. He attended Tufts University and played for the Athletics while still a student at Tufts. In 1911, he joined the Athletics after finishing his college semester in June and then returned to college after the end of the World Series, which the Athletics won although Martin did not pitch in the series. The 1912 Reach Guide described him as a "clever young pitcher" and said that the Athletics were "fortunate" in his "gradual development" in their pursuit of the 1911 league championship. As of the beginning of the 1911he was expected to graduate as a doctor in June 1912. He only pitched in two games for the Athletics in 1912 and never played professionally again.

Martin played semi-pro baseball prior to 1911 for a team in Rockport, Massachusetts, where he was a teammate of future Athletics teammate Stuffy McInnis.
