= Spring Creek raid =

1909 conflict between cattle ranchers and sheepherders in Wyoming

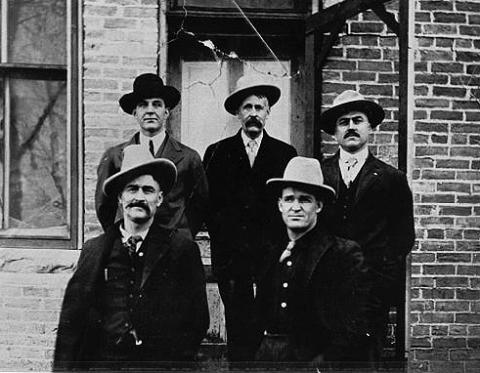
- Defendants in the Spring Creek Raid case. Clockwise from top left: Herbert Brink, Ed Eaton, George Saban, Tommy Dixon and Milton Alexander.
- Date: April 2, 1909
- Location: Near Ten Sleep, Wyoming, USA
- Also known as: Tensleep murders, Tensleep raid
- Outcome: Sheepherders killed
- Deaths: 3

The Spring Creek raid, also known as the Spring Creek massacre, Tensleep Murders or the Tensleep Raid, occurred in 1909 and was the last serious conflict during the Sheep Wars in Wyoming, as well as the deadliest sheep raid in the state's history. On the night of April 2, the sheepherder Joe Allemand and four of his associates were encamped along Spring Creek, near the town of Ten Sleep, when a group of seven masked cattlemen attacked them. It remains uncertain as to whether or not an exchange of gunfire took place between the two parties, but evidence suggests that Allemand and two of his men were executed while the remaining two escaped unharmed. Two sheep wagons were also destroyed by fire and about two dozen head of sheep were shot to death. Seven men were arrested for the crime, two of whom turned state's evidence and were acquitted. The rest were found guilty and sent to prison for sentences ranging from three years to life in prison. The conviction of the Tensleep murderers effectively put an end to the killings on the open range and exemplified the arrival of law and order in a region that still retained its rugged frontier environment after the end of the 19th century. Although there continued to be sheep raids in Wyoming into the 1910s, there were no more deaths.

== Background ==
For decades prior to 1909, sheepmen and cattlemen had been fighting for control of America's vast unsettled grasslands. The conflicts usually began as disputes over grazing rights, but the cattlemen also complained that the sheepmen destroyed the open range and made it unsuitable for cattle. For example, cattlemen claimed that sheepmen let their flocks overgraze, or that the sharp hooves of the sheep were cutting up the grass to a point where it wouldn't grow back. Sheepmen were also said to have polluted the water sources so badly that cattle could not drink from them without becoming sick. Generally, the cattlemen were the stronger of the two factions and they controlled the range by establishing a type of border called "deadlines" and hiring gunmen to prevent sheepherders from crossing them.

Around 1908, the sheep and cattlemen's associations of Wyoming agreed to the establishment of a deadline in Big Horn County. Tensleep Creek made up at least part of the border; west of the creek was cattle country while the area to the east was for the sheepmen. However, not long after the agreement was in effect, the herder Joe Allemand and his partner, Joseph Emge, became some of the first to break it when they began moving their flocks across the deadline to a place near Worland for the winter season. Soon after, other sheepherders followed suit "until the division [deadline] was practically no division, and no range was safe to the cattlemen." Together, Allemand and Emge owned three ranches in the area east of the deadline, all near the mouth of Spring Creek and Tensleep Creek. Emge, a German immigrant, was formerly a cattlemen, but he "abandoned the business, and went over to the enemy" sometime shortly after the turn of the century. According to author George C. Morris, Allemand was well-liked and considered a peaceful man that had been involved in the sheep trade for years, but Emge was more aggressive and probably the one who decided to lead the sheep across cattle country, being that he was the trail master. In this case, Emge was well aware of the consequences of passing through cattle country with a herd of sheep, so, during the first drive, he had a local deputy sheriff accompany him. According to Morris, the deputy prevented the cattlemen from attacking, but when Emge requested assistance for the drive back home he was declined. The sheriff warned Emge to detour around the cattle ranges, but he failed to follow the advice, possibly because taking the detour was a longer journey. Instead of relying on the police, Emge purchased two automatic rifles with 1,000 rounds of ammunition and openly said they were for "running the cattlemen off the range."

== Raid ==
The Allemand-Emge party consisted of five men, including Allemand and Emge, two sheep wagons, several sheep dogs, and between 2,500 and 12,000 head of sheep, depending on varying sources. The other three men were hired hands named Jules Lazier, Allemand's nephew, Pierre Cafferal and Charles "Bounce" Helmer. The herd was divided into two groups, one on each side of Spring Creek, with a wagon and at least one dog attached to each one. For the first thirty miles or so the journey was uneventful, but, on April 2, the party met up with a pair of friends, who lived nearby, and stopped to have dinner with them. Allemand also telephoned his wife sometime during the drive, to tell her that he would be home soon. According to one source, some of Emge's enemies were listening in on the phone call and were able to plan an attack based on the information. When dinner was over it was already dark, so the party decided to camp for the night and continue on in the morning. The location of the camp was about a half day's ride from the deadline and safety, but also near the Keyes Ranch, where the raiders had assembled. The raiders, who were later identified as George Saban, Herbert Brink, Albert Keyes, Charles Farris, Ed Eaton, Tommy Dixon, and Milton Alexander, rode out from the ranch sometime that night and found the sheepherders' camp soon after. At least half of the group were wealthy cattlemen. George Saban, the leader of the group, was the owner of the Bay State Cattle Company, one of the largest in Wyoming, and already known to the public for having led the lynch mob that raided the Big Horn County jail in 1903, where two prisoners and a deputy sheriff were killed.

There were two other cattlemen in the area as well, Porter Lamb and Fred Greet, who were camping in a tent within 400 yards of the Allemand-Emge camp, on land that was part of the Lamb Ranch. According to Morris: "[Lamb and Greet] were awakened by staccato cracks of automatic rifles and the glimmering starlight made indistinctly visible moving shadows stepping swiftly about in the haze, punctured with spitting flame flashes when the weapons spoke. Ultimately the firing ceased, then followed the flare of burning sheep wagons. A chorus of galloping hoofs- then silence." Lamb and Greet were the ones who first discovered the remains of the sheepherders on the following morning. Morris wrote: "When dawn came Lamb and Greet stood aghast at the vendetta vengeance that had been taken. In front of the wagon ruins Allemand lay face upward with bullet holes in his neck and side, to show where deadly soft-nosed missiles took his life. In the charred still-smoking embers were two baked bodies, subsequently identified as Emge, the daring, and Jules Lazier, a herder. 'Bounce' Helmer and Pierre Cafferal, two herders in the wagon on the other side of the creek, escaped through the leniency of the raiders and it is believed their lives were spared because Helmer's father is of the cattlemen and a leader among them." Although some accounts vary, it is generally believed that the group of raiders snuck up to the Allemand-Emge camp, split in two, and then began shooting at the flocks or advancing on the wagons. After that they called on the herders to surrender, but when Allemand came out he was shot down in cold blood. The raiders then fired into the wagons and it was during this time that Emge and Lazier were killed while Cafferal and Helmer were captured and tied up with rope. However, the latter two men were either freed by the raiders later on, as Morris claims, or they were able to untangle the ropes and free themselves, as another source says.

Cafferal and Helmer went straight from the camp to alert the police, who organized a posse, which arrived at the crime scene on the next day. Overall, Allemand, Emge, and Lazier were killed along with two of their dogs and twenty-five sheep. The rest of the herd was scattered and both wagons were burned. Cafferal and Helmer had suspicions about who had attacked their camp, but all of the raiders wore masks and therefore could not be positively identified by the survivors' testimony alone.

== Aftermath ==
The Tensleep Murders shocked the people in the surrounding communities, particularly the sheepmen, so the Wyoming Wool Growers' Association offered a large reward for the capture of the murderers or information that led to it. The Wyoming Wool Growers' put up a bounty $5,000, which was supplemented by $2,000 from the National Wool Growers' Association, $1,000 from Big Horn County, and another $500 from the state of Wyoming. In Morris' words; "the sheepmen played upon the cupidity of men and balanced golden gains in rewards against silence and fear of punishment." Sheep raiders had never been convicted in a Wyoming court before so all of the raiders assumed they had nothing to fear. In the days that followed, Brink and Dixon bragged about committing the murders until one of their friends, William "Billy" Goodrich, informed Sheriff Felix Alston in Basin. Goodrich told the sheriff the identities of all the men involved and he then told either Brink or Dixon that if they wanted to help the rest of the raiders then they had better surrender before the grand jury met later that month. At that point, Keyes and Farris took the advice and surrendered to Sheriff Alston. Then, Alston, Goodrich, Keyes, and Farris had a meeting in Sheridan with Governor Bryant B. Brooks and a few Wyoming attorneys. There, Keyes and Farris made a full confession with the promise that they'd be pardoned and safely escorted out of the state after the trial. None were eligible for the reward. Warrants were issued for the arrest of the other five raiders, Saban, Brink, Eaton, Dixon and Alexander, and they were hastily detained without any trouble on May 3.

Around this time, a man named "Billy" Garrison committed suicide because of his involvement in the case. Like Goodrich, Garrison was one of the men Dixon and Brink bragged to so, instead of testifying against his friends, he rode to a place five miles from his home, the Goodrich Ranch, and shot himself. Garrison's death was officially determined to have been caused by suicide, but there is a possibility that the cattlemen wanted to silence him before a trial could begin. Morris wrote the following: "It was a season of suppressed seething that threatened to boil over at any moment. Feeling was intense when it was known that Farris and Keyes had confessed, for that is one of the unpardonable offenses of the range. In the history of Big Horn County only three grand juries have ever been assembled because of the reluctance or refusal of witnesses summoned to give testimony that would be inadmissible in courts of law. That it went hard against the grain is eloquently verified by the suicide of 'Billy' Garrison. He lived at the Goodrich place and had been told things by Brink and Dixon. He perjured himself loyally before the grand jury, then drove to a ranch some five miles distant from the Goodrich home, put his horse up in the barn and shot himself to death. It was his conception of loyalty. Rather than send his friends to death he went to his own bravely."

The trial was held in Basin. The remaining five raiders quickly gave in and confessed like Keyes and Farris or pleaded guilty. Brink was the first to be tried. The testimony of Keyes, Farris, and Goodrich convinced the jury that he was almost solely responsible for the deaths. Farris' testimony was actually a direct accusation that Brink shot Allemand. Morris quoted the following from the state's records: "I heard Brink shout: 'Show a light and come out,'... A man appeared at the front of the wagon. 'Hands up!' cried Brink. The man's hands were in the air as he came towards us. Then Brink said: 'This is a hell of time o' night to come up with your hands in the air!' There was a shot. Who fired it? Herbert Brink." Brink was sentenced to hang for first degree murder, but it was later reduced to life in prison at the Wyoming State Penitentiary in Rawlins. Saban and Alexander both admitted to second degree murder and were sentenced to twenty-five years in prison while Dixon and Eaton each received three years imprisonment for arson. Morris says that the majority of the people of Wyoming were aligned with the cattlemen so, on November 20, 1909, when the raiders were to begin their sentences, Basin citizens crowded the train station to say goodbye to the raiders and give them gifts, such as blankets. Morris notes that nobody was waiting to greet Farris, Keyes, and Goodrich when they left. All three sold their belongings and headed west with a deputy sheriff, who escorted them to the state border.

As for the five prisoners, Eaton died in state custody, Dixon was paroled in 1912, Saban served as head coach and team captain for the prison's baseball team before escaping in 1913, never to be recaptured, and Brink and Alexander were paroled in 1914. The conviction of the Tensleep Murderers brought some peace to Wyoming's open range. Because the state's government was finally making convictions, cowboys became reluctant to shoot people over grazing rights, knowing that now they could be held accountable for it. One of the prosecutors in the case, Will Metz, summarized the meaning of the verdicts by saying that "it is significant of the beginning of a new era, of a period where lawlessness in any form will be no more tolerated [in Wyoming] than in the more densely settled communities of the east." A monument now marks the site of the raid.

In 1911, the area where the murders occurred became part of Washakie County.

== See also ==
- List of feuds in the United States
