= Otis Johnson (baseball) =

American baseball player (1883–1915)

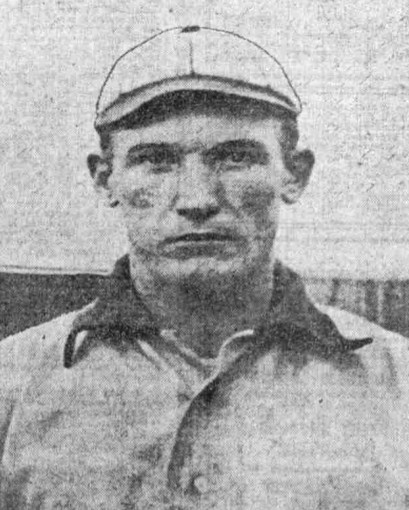
- Shortstop
- Born: November 5, 1883; Fowler, Indiana, U.S.
- Died: November 9, 1915 (aged 32); Johnson City, New York, U.S.
- Batted: Both Threw: Right

MLB debut
- April 12, 1911, for the New York Highlanders

Last MLB appearance
- September 21, 1911, for the New York Highlanders

MLB statistics
- Batting average: .234
- Home runs: 3
- Runs batted in: 36
- Stats at Baseball Reference

Teams
- New York Highlanders (1911)

Otis L. Johnson (November 5, 1883 – November 9, 1915) was an American Major League Baseball shortstop. Johnson played for the New York Highlanders in 1911. In 71 career games, he had 49 hits in 209 at-bats, with 36 RBIs. He batted right and left and threw right-handed.

Johnson was born in Fowler, Indiana, and died in Johnson City, New York. He accidentally shot himself in a hunting accident and died at a hospital.
