= Jack Lively =

American baseball player (1885–1967)

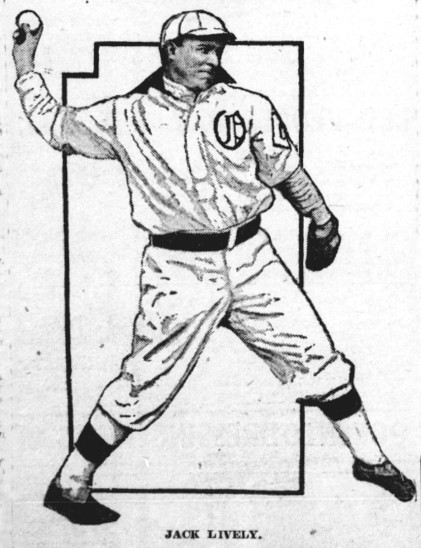
- Pitcher
- Born: May 29, 1885; Joppa, Alabama, U.S.
- Died: December 5, 1967 (aged 82); Arab, Alabama, U.S.
- Batted: Right Threw: Right

MLB debut
- April 16, 1911, for the Detroit Tigers

Last MLB appearance
- October 6, 1911, for the Detroit Tigers

MLB statistics
- Win–loss record: 7–5
- Earned run average: 4.59
- Strikeouts: 45
- Stats at Baseball Reference

Teams
- Detroit Tigers (1911)

Henry Everett "Jack" Lively (May 29, 1885 – December 5, 1967) was an American right-handed baseball pitcher.

A native of Alabama, Lively played professional baseball from 1906 to 1915. In 1908, he won a combined 25 games for two minor league teams, and in 1909 he pitched a no-hitter for the Montgomery Climbers. The following year, he appeared in 52 games for the Oakland Oaks of the Pacific Coast League and compiled a 31–15 record with a 1.44 earned run average (ERA).

In 1911, he made his debut in Major League Baseball for the Detroit Tigers. He appeared in 18 games for the Tigers and compiled a 7–5 record with a 4.59 ERA. After the 1911 season, he played in the minor leagues for three more seasons with the Sacramento Sacts (1913), Montgomery Rebels (1914), and Little Rock Travelers (1915).

== Early years ==
Lively was born in 1885 in Joppa, Alabama.

== Professional baseball ==
=== Gulfport and Montgomery (1906–09) ===
Lively began playing professional baseball in 1906 for the Gulfport team in the Cotton States League. He compiled a 9–3 record in 15 games for Gulfport.

In 1908, Lively began the season with Gulfport, compiling a 20-15 record in 37 games. He was sold in late August to the Montgomery Climbers of the Southern Association and pitched a three-hit shutout in his first game for the club. Lively appeared in seven games for Montgomery in the last month of the 1908 season. He compiled a combined record of 25–17 for Gulfport and Montgomery.

In 1909, Lively returned to Montgomery, compiling an 18–16 record in 38 games. On July 28, 1909, he pitched a no-hitter against Little Rock. The only Little Rock batter to reach first base did so on an error when the center fielder dropped a fly ball. Lively also had a putout and six assists in the game.

=== Oakland Oaks (1910) ===
In 1910, Lively played for the Oakland Oaks of the Pacific Coast League (PCL). He appeared in a career high 52 games and compiled a 31–15 record with a 1.55 ERA. He led the PCL with a .674 winning percentage and gave up only 200 hits out of 1,417 batters faced. Bunny Pearce, who was Oakland's catcher in 1910, attributed Lively's success to his unusual delivery: "Lively takes a long time in winding up. The batter, who times his movement, takes a step forward but Lively hesitates just a moment and then lets the ball come with the result that the batsman is taken off his stride and either fans the pellet or doesn't strike at it at all."

=== Detroit Tigers (1911) ===
In September 1910, the Detroit Tigers purchased Lively from Oakland for the 1911 season. Lively signed with the Tigers in February 1911. He made his major league debut on April 16, and pitched a complete game victory over Cleveland, allowing seven hits and two runs in nine innings. E.A. Batchelor wrote that Lively used his spitball extensively: "There was no mistaking Jack's spitter, for when the batsmen connected with it the spray could be felt in the grandstand. Nothing mean about Jack. When he moistens the ball, the sanitary commission goes into hysterics. Besides the saliva, the ball had a nice break, and it was varied by mixture with a fast one, heaved without hydraulics." He played in 18 games for the 1911 Tigers, compiling a record of 7–5 with 10 complete games and a 4.59 ERA. He had a .256 batting average with two doubles, a triple, and four RBIs. Lively played his last major league game on October 6, 1911.

Though Lively spent only one season with the Tigers, E.A. Batchelor wrote in March 1912: "In his year of service with the Jungle band, Jack probably furnished as much fun and was the butt of as many amusing stories as anyone who ever wore Detroit livery." In one instance, he did 50 cents in damage to a chair in a Philadelphia hotel room and decided to conceal the evidence by breaking the chair into 32 small pieces and hiding them in a closet. The chambermaid discovered the evidence, and Lively was billed $18 for the chair.

=== Sacramento, Montgomery and Little Rock (1913–15) ===
Lively continue to play in the minor leagues until 1915. He appeared in 41 games (235-1/3 innings) with the Sacramento Sacts in 1913, compiling an 11-13 record. In 1914, he returned to his home state, appearing in 25 games (170 innings) for the Montgomery Rebels and compiling a 9-9 record. He wound up his career appearing in five games for the Little Rock Travelers in 1915.

== Family and later years ==
After his baseball career ended, Lively worked for the American Cast Iron Pipe Company in Birmingham, Alabama.

His son, Buddy Lively, was a pitcher for the Cincinnati Reds from 1947 to 1949.

Lively died at age 82 in 1967 at Arab, Alabama. He was buried at the Hebron Church of Christ Cemetery in Arab.
