= Elmer Leonard =

American baseball player (1888-1981)

- Pitcher
- Born: November 12, 1888; Napa, California, U.S.
- Died: May 27, 1981 (aged 92); Napa, California, U.S.
- Batted: Right Threw: Right

MLB debut
- June 22, 1911, for the Philadelphia Athletics

Last MLB appearance
- July 27, 1911, for the Philadelphia Athletics

MLB statistics
- Win–loss record: 2–2
- Earned run average: 2.84
- Strikeouts: 10
- Stats at Baseball Reference

Teams
- Philadelphia Athletics (1911)

Elmer Ellsworth Leonard (November 12, 1888 – May 27, 1981), nicknamed "Tiny", was an American Major League Baseball pitcher. He played for the Philadelphia Athletics during the 1911 season.
