= Gene Elliott =

American baseball player (1889-1976)

- Outfielder
- Born: February 8, 1889; Fayette County, Pennsylvania
- Died: January 5, 1976 (aged 86); Huntingdon, Pennsylvania
- Batted: Left Threw: Right

MLB debut
- April 14, 1911, for the New York Highlanders

Last MLB appearance
- May 14, 1911, for the New York Highlanders

MLB statistics
- Batting average: .077
- Home runs: 0
- Runs batted in: 1
- Stats at Baseball Reference

Teams
- New York Highlanders (1911)

Eugene Birminghouse Elliott (February 8, 1889 – January 5, 1976) was a Major League Baseball outfielder. Ellitott played for the New York Highlanders in the 1911 season. In 5 career games, he had 1 hit, in 13 at-bats, a .077 batting average. He batted left and threw right-handed.

Elloitt was born in Fayette County, Pennsylvania and died in Huntingdon, Pennsylvania.
