= Lep Long =

American baseball player (1888-1958)

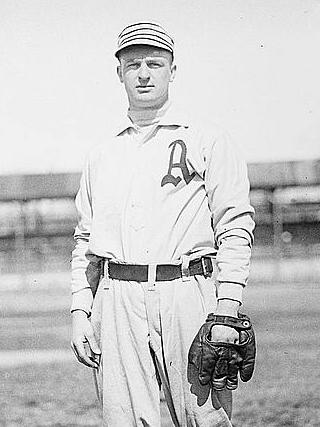
- Pitcher
- Born: July 12, 1888; Summit, New Jersey, U.S.
- Died: October 21, 1958 (aged 70); Birmingham, Alabama, U.S.
- Batted: Right Threw: Right

MLB debut
- June 29, 1911, for the Philadelphia Athletics

Last MLB appearance
- July 17, 1911, for the Philadelphia Athletics

MLB statistics
- Win–loss record: 0–0
- Earned run average: 4.50
- Strikeouts: 4
- Stats at Baseball Reference

Teams
- Philadelphia Athletics (1911)

Lester "Lep" Long (July 12, 1888 – October 21, 1958) was an American Major League Baseball pitcher. He played four games for the Philadelphia Athletics in 1911.
