= Fred Sherry (baseball) =

American baseball player (1889-1975)

- Pitcher
- Born: June 13, 1889; Honesdale, Pennsylvania, U.S.
- Died: July 27, 1975 (aged 86); Honesdale, Pennsylvania, U.S.
- Batted: Right Threw: Right

MLB debut
- April 25, 1911, for the Washington Senators

Last MLB appearance
- June 28, 1911, for the Washington Senators

MLB statistics
- Win–loss record: 0-4
- Earned run average: 4.30
- Strikeouts: 20
- Stats at Baseball Reference

Teams
- Washington Senators (1911)

Fred Peter Sherry (June 13, 1889 – July 27, 1975) was an American Major League Baseball pitcher who played for the Washington Senators in 1911.
