= Buddy Lively =

American baseball player (1925–2015)

- Pitcher
- Born: February 14, 1925; Birmingham, Alabama, U.S.
- Died: July 12, 2015 (aged 90); Huntsville, Alabama, U.S.
- Batted: Right Threw: Right

MLB debut
- April 17, 1947, for the Cincinnati Reds

Last MLB appearance
- September 25, 1949, for the Cincinnati Reds

MLB statistics
- Win–loss record: 8–13
- Earned run average: 4.16
- Strikeouts: 94
- Stats at Baseball Reference

Teams
- Cincinnati Reds (1947–1949)

Everett Adrian Lively (February 14, 1925 – July 12, 2015), nicknamed "Red", was an American professional baseball player. He was a right-handed pitcher over parts of three seasons (1947–49) with the Cincinnati Reds. For his career, he compiled an 8–13 record, with a 4.16 earned run average, and 94 strikeouts in 249 innings pitched. He was born in Birmingham, Alabama and is the son of former Major League Baseball player Jack Lively.

Prior to his entry into Major League Baseball, Lively served in the United States Army with the anti-aircraft battalion part of General George S. Patton's Third Army, fighting in France and Belgium in Europe from 1944–46.

He died in Huntsville, Alabama on July 12, 2015.

== See also ==
- List of second-generation Major League Baseball players
