= Joe Walsh (catcher) =

American baseball player (1886–1967)

- Catcher
- Born: October 14, 1886; Minersville, Pennsylvania
- Died: January 6, 1967 (aged 80); Buffalo, New York
- Batted: Right Threw: Right

MLB debut
- July 7, 1910, for the New York Highlanders

Last MLB appearance
- May 5, 1911, for the New York Highlanders

MLB statistics
- Batting average: .308
- Home runs: 0
- Runs batted in: 2
- Stats at Baseball Reference

Teams
- New York Highlanders (1910–1911)

Joseph Francis Walsh (October 14, 1886 – January 6, 1967), nicknamed "Tweet", was a Major League Baseball catcher. Walsh played for the New York Highlanders in 1910 and 1911. In 5 career games, he had four hits in 13 at-bats, with 2 RBIs. He batted and threw right-handed.

Walsh was born in Minersville, Pennsylvania, and died in Buffalo, New York.
