= Bill Bailey (outfielder) =

American baseball player (1881-1967)

- Outfielder
- Born: November 19, 1881; Shawnee, Ohio, U.S.
- Died: October 27, 1967 (aged 85); Seattle, Washington, U.S.
- Batted: Left Threw: Right

MLB debut
- April 21, 1911, for the New York Highlanders

Last MLB appearance
- May 27, 1911, for the New York Highlanders

MLB statistics
- Batting average: .111
- Home runs: 0
- Runs batted in: 0
- Stats at Baseball Reference

Teams
- New York Highlanders (1911)

Harry Lewis "Bill" Bailey (November 19, 1881 – October 27, 1967) was an American outfielder in Major League Baseball.
