= Chester Emerson =

American baseball player (1889–1971)

- Outfielder
- Born: October 27, 1889; Stow, Maine, U.S.
- Died: July 2, 1971 (aged 81); Augusta, Maine, U.S.
- Batted: Left Threw: Right

MLB debut
- September 27, 1911, for the Philadelphia Athletics

Last MLB appearance
- April 16, 1912, for the Philadelphia Athletics

MLB statistics
- Batting average: .211
- Home runs: 0
- Runs batted in: 0
- Stats at Baseball Reference

Teams
- Philadelphia Athletics (1911–1912)

Chester Arthur Emerson (October 27, 1889 – July 2, 1971) was an American Major League Baseball player. Nicknamed "Chuck", he played parts of two seasons, 1911 and 1912, for the Philadelphia Athletics. He played a total of eight games—seven in the outfield—and had four hits in 19 at bats for a batting average of .211.
