= Wyoming State Penitentiary All Stars =

Inmate baseball team

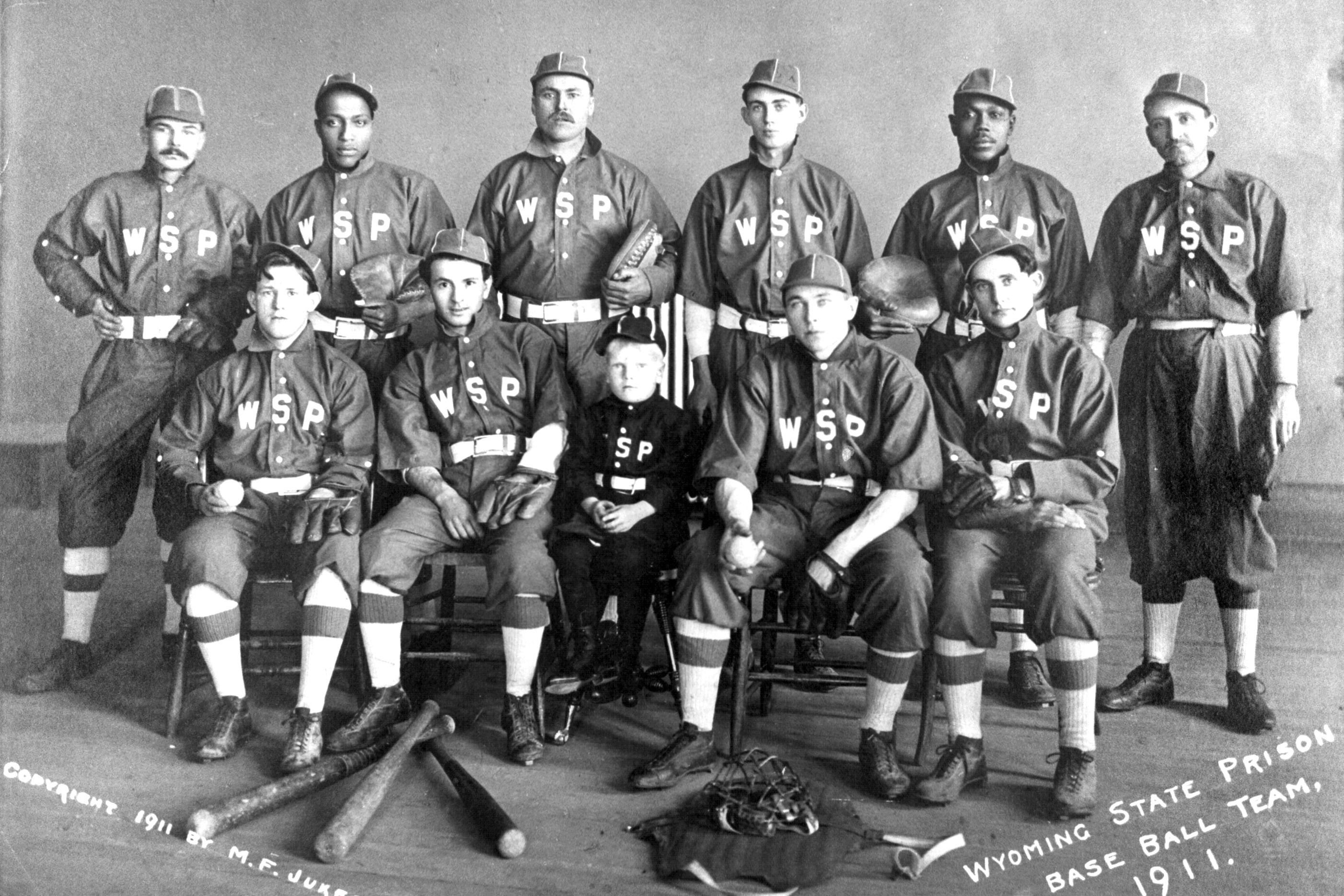
- The All Stars' roster with their mascot, Felix Alston, Jr. (center)
- Nicknames: All Stars, All-Stars, The Cons
- Founded: 1911
- Disbanded: 1911
- Based in: Rawlins
- Ballpark: Wyoming State Penitentiary
- Head coach: George Saban
- Manager: Felix Alston
- Overall record: 4–0
- Mascot: Felix Alston, Jr.

The Wyoming State Penitentiary All Stars (Note: Also spelled All-Stars, and nicknamed "The Cons") were a baseball team known for being made up of prison inmates.

== Founding ==
In April 1911, Felix Alston replaced Otto Gramm as warden of the Wyoming State Penitentiary. Alston then created the All Stars baseball team as an attempt to boost morale. The team consisted of 12 players from ages 18 to 39. Alston chose George Saban, who was convicted of murder in the Spring Creek raid, to be head coach and team captain because of their long-standing friendship; Saban was the Alstons' neighbor and guest at their wedding. Saban did not play as a result of prior finger amputations.

== Games ==
The All Stars only ever played games against the Rawlins Juniors, the company team for the Wyoming Supply Company. The All Stars won all four games they played. The All Stars debuted on July 18, 1911, defeating the Juniors 11–1 at home. Their second game, also at home, was played August 5 and was another 11–1 win. Their third game was played on August 13, the score being 11–4. Their final game was played on August 29 at Overland Park, with a final score of 15–10.

== Disbandment ==
In the days following the All Stars' fourth game, Alston began replacing baseball with education.

== Roster ==
Pos.	Name	Inmate No.	Crime(s)	Fate	Ref.
Coach	Saban, George	1441	Murder	Escaped in Dec 1913	
P	Cameron, Thomas	1596	Sexual assault	Sentence expired in June 1912	
P	Pendergraft, Harry A.	1589	Larceny	Granted parole in Jan 1912	
C, RF	Powell, James	1532	Rape		
1B	Rowan, Eugene	1489	Rape, Breaking and entering	Granted parole in Nov 1913	
2B	Fitzgerald, Frank	1481	Breaking and entering	Released in Dec 1911	
SS	Guzzardo, Joe	1341	Manslaughter	Pardoned in July 1912	
3B	Crottie, John	1569	Grand larceny	Released in Nov 1911	
LF	Carman, Ora	1508	Grand larceny	Sentence expired in Sept 1911	
LF	Stone, Earl	1480	Breaking and entering	Sentence expired in Sept 1911	
CF	Potter, Sidney	1477	Forgery	Sentence expired in June 1912	
RF, C, SS	Seng, Joseph	1612	First-degree murder	Hanged in May 1912	
