= Allan Collamore =

American baseball player (1887–1980)

- Pitcher
- Born: June 5, 1887; Worcester, Massachusetts, U.S.
- Died: August 8, 1980 (aged 93); Battle Creek, Michigan, U.S.
- Batted: Right Threw: Right

MLB debut
- April 15, 1911, for the Philadelphia Athletics

Last MLB appearance
- October 2, 1915, for the Cleveland Indians

MLB statistics
- Win–loss record: 5–13
- Earned run average: 3.30
- Strikeouts: 48
- Stats at Baseball Reference

Teams
- Philadelphia Athletics (1911); Cleveland Naps / Indians (1914–1915)

Allan Edward Collamore (June 5, 1887 – August 8, 1980) was an American professional baseball pitcher who played in Major League Baseball for three seasons with the Philadelphia Athletics (1911) and Cleveland Naps / Indians (1914–1915).
