= Dan McGee =

American baseball player (1911-1991)

- Shortstop
- Born: September 29, 1911; New York City, U.S.
- Died: December 4, 1991 (aged 80); Lakehurst, New Jersey, U.S.
- Batted: Right Threw: Right

MLB debut
- July 14, 1934, for the Boston Braves

Last MLB appearance
- July 20, 1934, for the Boston Braves

MLB statistics
- Batting average: .136
- Home runs: 0
- Runs batted in: 1
- Stats at Baseball Reference

Teams
- Boston Braves (1934)

Daniel Aloysius McGee (September 29, 1911 – December 4, 1991) was an American Major League Baseball player. He played seven games with the Boston Braves between July 14 and July 20, 1934.
