= Howard Armstrong (baseball) =

American baseball player (1889-1926)

- Pitcher
- Born: December 2, 1889; East Claridon, Ohio, U.S.
- Died: March 8, 1926 (aged 36); Canisteo, New York, U.S.
- Batted: Right Threw: Right

MLB debut
- September 30, 1911, for the Philadelphia Athletics

Last MLB appearance
- September 30, 1911, for the Philadelphia Athletics

MLB statistics
- Win–loss record: 0–1
- Earned run average: 0.00
- Strikeouts: 0
- Stats at Baseball Reference

Teams
- Philadelphia Athletics (1911)

Howard Elmer Armstrong (December 2, 1889 – March 8, 1926) was an American Major League Baseball pitcher. He played for the Philadelphia Athletics during the 1911 season

Armstrong married Lucy Irene Douglas (October 15, 1899–1989) of Clarion, Ohio, who met Armstrong while he was boarding with Lucy's mother, Mae Brewster Douglass. They eloped, in 1916 to Hamilton, Ontario. Mae was not happy about the marriage and set Pinkerton after the couple, but they were already married. The couple had three children, Robert, James, and Thomas.

Armstrong played for factory baseball teams in Ohio and Canisteo and was well known locally.

Howard Armstrong died in 1926, most likely of a staph infection. His immediate family remained in the Canisteo area, with seven grandchildren and many great-grandchildren living throughout the country.
