= Jack Ness =

American baseball player (1885–1957)

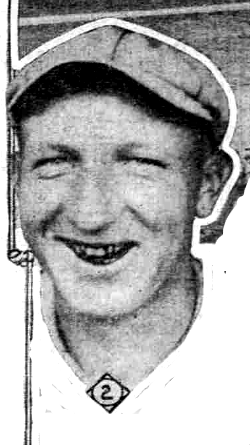
- First baseman
- Born: November 11, 1885; Chicago, Illinois, U.S.
- Died: December 3, 1957 (aged 72); DeLand, Florida, U.S.
- Batted: Right Threw: Right

MLB debut
- May 9, 1911, for the Detroit Tigers

Last MLB appearance
- September 30, 1916, for the Chicago White Sox

MLB statistics
- Batting average: .253
- Home runs: 1
- Runs batted in: 36
- Stats at Baseball Reference

Teams
- Detroit Tigers (1911); Chicago White Sox (1916)

John Charles Ness (November 11, 1885 – December 3, 1957) was an American first baseman in Major League Baseball for the Detroit Tigers and Chicago White Sox.

While playing in the Pacific Coast League in 1915, Ness had a 49-game hitting streak.

== Career ==
Ness was born in Chicago, Illinois. He started his professional baseball career in 1908, with the Northern League's Duluth White Sox. The next season, he moved over to the Wisconsin-Illinois League and batted .301.

In 1910, Ness moved up to the Class B Tri-State League with the Williamsport Millionaires. He batted .315 that season and led the league in hits, with 129. This performance earned him a roster spot on the Detroit Tigers, and he made his major league debut on May 9, 1911. In 12 games for the Tigers, he batted just .154. On June 15, he was traded to the New England League's New Bedford Whalers. He spent two seasons in New Bedford before joining the Oakland Oaks of the Pacific Coast League. In 1913, Ness batted .264, and in 1914, he raised his average to .292. One newspaper wrote that he was "the most popular player in the Coast league, both with players and fans alike."

In the summer of 1915, Ness made baseball history. Starting on Memorial Day and going through until July 22, he hit safely in 49 consecutive games. His streak shattered the previous Pacific Coast League record of 29 games and also broke Willie Keeler's all-time professional baseball record of 44, which was set in 1897. During the 49 games, Ness had 79 hits and batted .457. The streak stood as the PCL record until Joe DiMaggio hit in 61 straight games in 1933.

Ness ended the 1915 season with a .339 batting average and 16 home runs in 186 games. He was then acquired by the Chicago White Sox and had his second stint in the major leagues in 1916. Replacing the poor-fielding Jack Fournier at first base, Ness played 75 games for Chicago. He batted .267 with 1 home run and 34 runs batted in.

Over the winter, Ness received a $500 cut in salary from White Sox owner Charles Comiskey. Ness promptly quit the game, saying, "I can pull down $100 a month playing semi-pro baseball in Chicago. That, added to my salary [as a mechanic], will give me about the same as that offered me to play for the Sox in 1917." The Chicago White Sox would win the American League pennant and World Series in 1917. Ness' replacement at first base, Chick Gandil, would later become the ringleader of the Black Sox Scandal.

Ness never played in organized baseball after 1916. He died in 1957, in DeLand, Florida.
