= Chick Lathers =

American baseball player (1888–1971)

- Chick Lathers in his University of Michigan baseball uniform, c. 1909
- Infielder
- Born: October 22, 1888; Dearborn, Michigan, U.S.
- Died: July 26, 1971 (aged 82); Petoskey, Michigan, U.S.
- Batted: Left Threw: Right

MLB debut
- May 1, 1910, for the Detroit Tigers

Last MLB appearance
- October 8, 1911, for the Detroit Tigers

MLB statistics
- Batting average: .228
- Hits: 29
- Runs batted in: 7
- Stats at Baseball Reference

Teams
- Detroit Tigers (1910–1911)

Charles Ten Eyck "Chick" Lathers (October 22, 1888 – July 26, 1971) was an American baseball player. With a .383 batting average, he was the third baseman and the leading hitter on the 1909 Michigan Wolverines baseball team that finished with a record of 18–3–1. He later played two years of Major League Baseball as an infielder for the Detroit Tigers. After retiring from baseball in 1913, Lathers worked for the Ford Motor Company for several years, served in the U.S. Army during World War I, and operated a dairy farm in northern Michigan from 1925 to 1962. He was also active in local government in northern Michigan.

== Biography ==
=== Early years ===
Lathers was born in Dearborn, Michigan. At age 16, Lathers played for the 1905 Cass club baseball team that won the city championship of Detroit, Michigan. The 1905 Cass club team also included two other future professional players – Bert Lerchen, who played for the Boston Red Sox, and Harvey Bussey, who played eight seasons in the minor leagues.

=== University of Michigan ===
After graduating from high school, Lathers enrolled at the University of Michigan where he played as a third baseman for the Michigan Wolverines baseball team. He was enrolled at Michigan in the engineering program from 1907 to 1910 and was described as "a major contributor" to the success of the 1909 Wolverines baseball team. The 1909 team finished with a record of 18–3–1 and outscored its opponents 140–59. Lathers was the leading hitter on the 1909 team with a batting average of .383. He was described by The Washington Post as the "baseball star of the University of Michigan" and "one of the best throwers ever seen on a Michigan ball field." The Post reported that Lathers had a batting average of more than .400 at Michigan, and noted that, "when he does hit, the ball goes a mile." Lathers was also considered a "sure fielder."

In February 1910, press accounts reported that Lathers had either been "expelled" or "flunked out" at Michigan. The 1910 baseball season at Michigan was the first under new coach Branch Rickey. Because of the expulsion of Lathers, Rickey, who was later inducted into the Baseball Hall of Fame, was deprived of the services of the team's best batsman.

=== Professional baseball ===
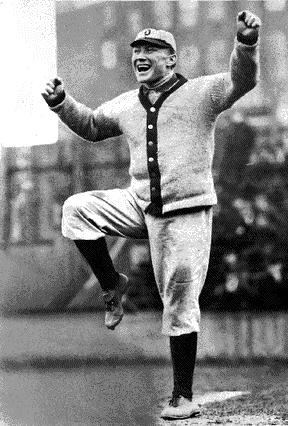
Detroit Tigers coach Hughie Jennings (pictured) signed Lathers upon his expulsion from the University of Michigan.

As soon as Lathers was expelled from Michigan, Detroit Tigers manager Hughie Jennings announced that Detroit had "first claim" on his services. Jenning said that he intended to take Lathers south for spring training and described Lathers as "an unusually promising player" whose "only fault" is base running, a skill at which Jennings was an expert teacher.

After joining the Tigers for spring training, Lathers made the team and had his major league debut on May 1, 1910. Early in the 1910 season, Lathers was touted as a future star. The Washington Post in late May 1910 published Lathers’ photograph with a caption describing him as "'Chick' Lathers, last year's star of the University of Michigan nine." However, with Jim Delahanty, Donie Bush, and George Moriarty holding down the starting jobs at second base, shortstop and third base, Lathers did not find his way into Detroit's starting lineup. As a result, Lathers spent most of the 1910 season, as one newspaper put it, "on the Tiger bench learning the rudiments by observing." Lathers played in 41 games for the 1910 Tigers, playing games at second base, shortstop and third base. He compiled a .230 batting average and .300 on-base percentage in 93 plate appearances during the 1910 season.

In February 1911, Lathers returned to the Tigers for spring training. Press accounts suggested that, if the injured legs of Delahanty and Bush had healed, there was "no chance" of Lathers taking their starting spots. However, one newspaper opined that Lathers "is a much better batter than O'Leary and if he could learn some of the fine points of the game while South, would have the call" at second base. As the spring progressed, Detroit manager Hughie Jennings tried moving Lathers to first base to find a spot for him in the starting lineup. The press reported that Jennings planned to have both a right and left hand batting first baseman, with Del Gainer or Ness getting the start when a left-hander was pitching and Lathers getting the start against right-handers. In the end, Jennings moved Delahanty to first base in 1911, and Lathers saw even less playing time than he had in his rookie season. He played in only 29 games and compiled a batting average of .222 and an on-base percentage of .314 in 53 plate appearances.

In 1912, Lathers tried for a regular position in the Tigers outfield, but failed to make the team. He was then shipped to the minor leagues by the Tigers to play with the Providence Grays in the International League. Lathers was joined in Providence by two other Detroit cast-offs, catcher Boss Schmidt and outfielder Delos Drake. By late July, newspapers reported that the three former Tigers playing in Providence were "fairly burning up the International League with their hitting." At the time, Schmidt was hitting .364 and Drake .330. Lathers spent much of the 1912 season on the "sick list," causing his batting average to slump, but by late July, his batting average had started to climb and stood at .304.

In his two-year major league career, Lathers played in a total of 70 games, all with the Detroit Tigers. He played games at all four infield positions (22 games at 3rd base, 16 games at 2nd base, and 8 games at shortstop). He had a career batting average of .228 with a .305 on-base percentage. His lifetime fielding percentage of .906 was 32 points lower than the league average during his years of play, and his Range factor of 2.94 was 1.66 points lower than the league average of 4.59.

=== Military service and Ford Motor Company ===
In December 1912, Lathers was traded by the Detroit Tigers to the Indianapolis baseball team run by Mike Kelley. In return for Lathers, the Tigers were to have received Charley O'Leary—the same player whose starting job Lathers had sought in 1911. Lathers was expected to play in the outfield for Indianapolis. However, in February 1913, the trade was cancelled after Lathers said he would not play baseball in 1913. It was reported that Lathers had quit baseball permanently to become an automobile salesman. Lathers reported that he was attached to the Kalamazoo, Michigan, store of the Ford Motor Company as a salesman. Lathers said of the new job that he "likes it so well he proposes to stick to it."

Lathers served in U.S. Army as an ordnance officer during World War I. After the war, Lathers returned to work at Ford Motor Company as a branch manager.

=== Dairy farmer and local politics ===
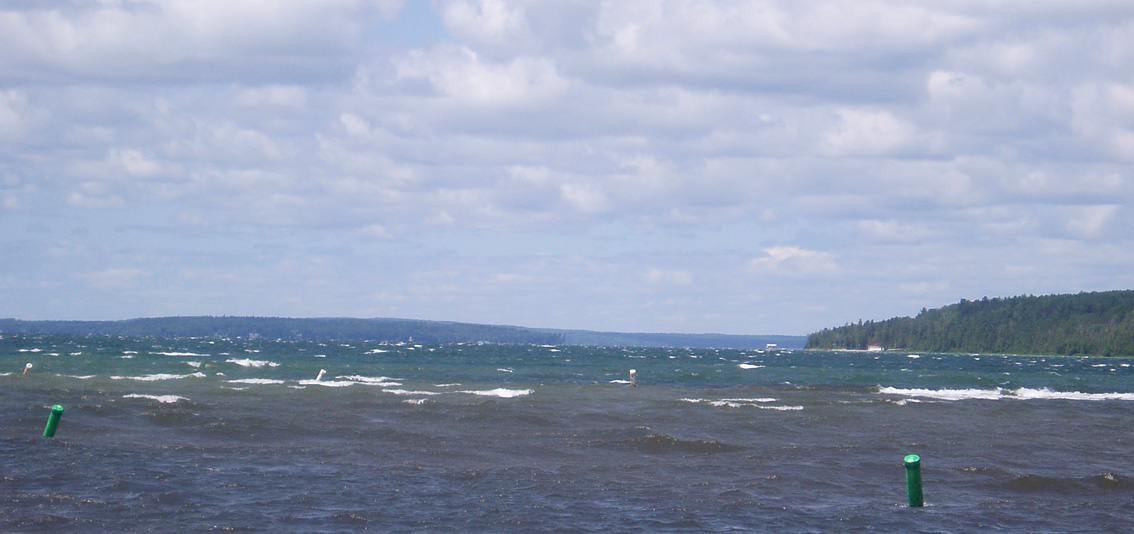
From 1925 to 1962, Lathers operated a dairy farm on the shores of Burt Lake (pictured).

In 1925, Lathers bought property on Burt Lake at Indian Point (also known as Colonial Point). Lathers built a dairy barn, which was still standing in 2006, a sheep barn, chicken coop, icehouse and other buildings. Lathers' farm bottled and sold unpasteurized milk from "his prized Golden Guernseys." He used giant chunks of ice cut from Burt Lake in winter to keep the milk chilled. For many years, Lathers also supplied the iceboxes of area resorters. Lathers continued to operate his dairy farm until 1962.

Lathers was also active in local government. In 1945, Lathers was living in Petoskey, Michigan, and was one of the principal forces pushing a plan to raise $50,000 to partially finance the reconstruction of the inland water route from Cheboygan, Michigan, to Conway, Michigan. Lathers and a group of northern Michigan businessmen formed a non-profit corporation to raise the funds from local residents and tourists. Lathers believed the route, which was known as Michigan's "forgotten water route," would promote tourism in northern Michigan. Lathers was also a longtime member of the Cheboygan County Road Commission. In 1953, he was elected chairman of the commission. He also served for a time as the head of the Michigan Association of Road Commissioners.

=== Later years ===
In 1962, Lathers sold his dairy farm. In his later years, he spent his winters in Ft. Lauderdale, Florida. Lathers died in 1971 at age 82 at Little Traverse Hospital in Petoskey, Michigan. He is buried at Greenwood Cemetery in Petoskey.
