= Ralph Kreitz =

American baseball player (1885–1941)

- Catcher
- Born: November 13, 1885; Plum Creek, Nebraska, U.S.
- Died: July 20, 1941 (aged 55); Portland, Oregon, U.S.
- Batted: Right Threw: Right

MLB debut
- August 1, 1911, for the Chicago White Sox

Last MLB appearance
- October 8, 1911, for the Chicago White Sox

MLB statistics
- Games played: 7
- At bats: 17
- Hits: 4
- Stats at Baseball Reference

Teams
- Chicago White Sox (1911)

Ralph Wesley Kreitz (November 13, 1885 – July 20, 1941) was an American catcher in Major League Baseball. Nicknamed "Red", he played for the Chicago White Sox in 1911.

Kreitz was born in Plum Creek, Nebraska, a town that later became known as Lexington. When he was a child, his family moved to Dayton, Ohio, and he lived there for many years. He appeared in a single minor league game in 1905, and he played at least partial seasons in the minor leagues between 1907 and 1910. Kreitz's minor league batting statistics are incomplete, but they do not show any home runs until 1910. In the second inning of a 1908 game with Class B Spokane, it looked like Kreitz had hit a home run, but he was called out because he failed to touch two of the bases. The opposing pitcher threw a no-hitter that day.

In July 1911, Kreitz had been playing minor league baseball in Dubuque when White Sox owner Charles Comiskey purchased his contract. This was his only major league call-up. He made his debut on August 1, when he got one of his three career major league hits. The White Sox were well-equipped at catcher that season; starting catcher Billy Sullivan led the league's catchers in fielding percentage, and the team also had Fred Payne and Bruno Block ahead of Kreitz on its depth chart. Kreitz appeared in a total of seven major league games, the last one coming on October 8 of that season.

Early in the 1912 season, Sacramento Sacts manager Charlie Graham purchased Kreitz's contract from the White Sox. Kreitz spent 1912 and 1913 in the Pacific Coast League with the Sacts, the Oakland Oaks and the Venice Tigers. After the conclusion of his playing career, Kreitz was the proprietor of a produce business.

Though he did not play professional baseball after the 1913 season, Kreitz died on a baseball field nearly three decades later. An 11-year resident of Hillsboro, Oregon, he was participating in a 1941 "old-timers' game" in his home state when he hit a ball and collapsed while running to first base. A physician came onto the field and pronounced Kreitz dead shortly thereafter. He was survived by his wife Norma and their three children.
