= Roy Corhan =

American baseball player (1887–1958)

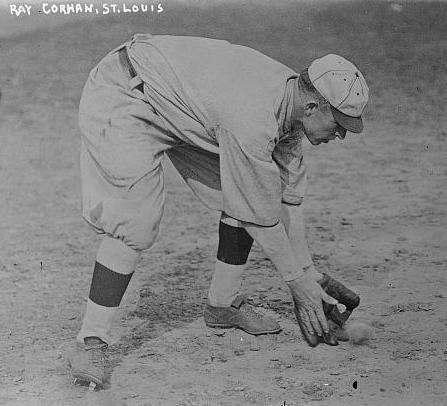
- Shortstop
- Born: October 21, 1887; Indianapolis, Indiana, U.S.
- Died: November 24, 1958 (aged 71); San Francisco, California, U.S.
- Batted: Right Threw: Right

MLB debut
- April 20, 1911, for the Chicago White Sox

Last MLB appearance
- September 2, 1916, for the St. Louis Cardinals

MLB statistics
- Batting average: .211
- Home runs: 0
- Runs batted in: 26
- Stats at Baseball Reference

Teams
- Chicago White Sox (1911); St. Louis Cardinals (1916)

Roy George Corhan (October 21, 1887 – November 24, 1958) was an American shortstop in Major League Baseball. He played for the Chicago White Sox and St. Louis Cardinals.
