= Guy McFadden =

American baseball player (1872–1911)

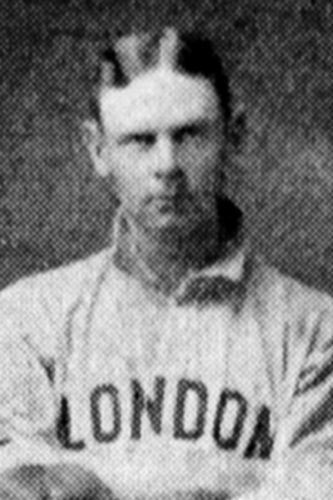
- First baseman
- Born: September 3, 1872; Topeka, Kansas, U.S.
- Died: March 10, 1911 (aged 38); Topeka, Kansas, U.S.
- Batted: Unknown Threw: Unknown

MLB debut
- August 24, 1895, for the St. Louis Browns

Last MLB appearance
- August 28, 1895, for the St. Louis Browns

MLB statistics
- Batting average: .214
- Home runs: 0
- Runs batted in: 2
- Stats at Baseball Reference

Teams
- St. Louis Browns (1895)

Guy G. McFadden (September 3, 1872 – March 10, 1911) was an American first baseman for the St. Louis Browns of the National League in 1895. His professional career also included stops in the Southwest League (1891), Western Association (1893–1894), Western Interstate League (1895), Eastern Iowa League (1895), Southern Association (1896) and Canadian League (1899).
