= Mike Fitzgerald (outfielder) =

American baseball player (1891-1945)

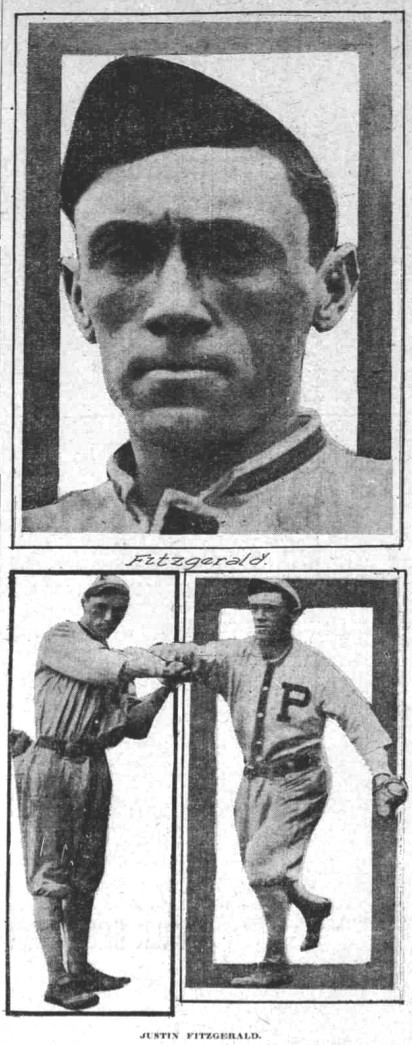
- Outfielder
- Born: June 26, 1891; San Mateo, California, U.S.
- Died: January 17, 1945 (aged 53); San Mateo, California, U.S.
- Batted: Left Threw: Right

MLB debut
- June 20, 1911, for the New York Highlanders

Last MLB appearance
- September 2, 1918, for the Philadelphia Phillies

MLB statistics
- Batting average: .288
- Home runs: 0
- Runs batted in: 12
- Stats at Baseball Reference

Teams
- New York Highlanders (1911); Philadelphia Phillies (1918)

Justin Howard '"Mike"' Fitzgerald (June 26, 1891 – January 17, 1945) was an American Major League Baseball player. Fitzgerald played for the New York Highlanders in 1911 and the Philadelphia Phillies 1918. He batted and threw right-handed.

He was born and died in San Mateo, California.
