= Willie Hogan =

American baseball player

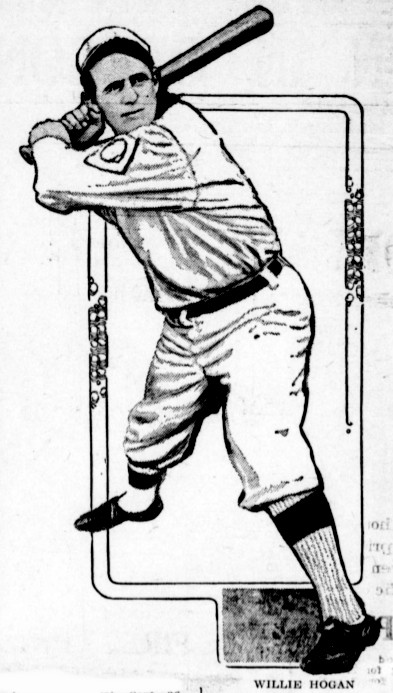
- Outfielder
- Born: September 14, 1884; North San Juan, California, U.S.
- Died: September 28, 1974 (aged 90); San Jose, California, U.S.
- Batted: Left Threw: Right

MLB debut
- April 12, 1911, for the Philadelphia Athletics

Last MLB appearance
- September 22, 1912, for the St. Louis Browns

MLB statistics
- Batting average: .236
- Home runs: 3
- Runs batted in: 100
- Stats at Baseball Reference

Teams
- Philadelphia Athletics (1911); St. Louis Browns (1911–1912)

William Henry Hogan (September 14, 1884 – September 28, 1974) was an American Major League Baseball outfielder. He played for the Philadelphia Athletics during the 1911 season and the St. Louis Browns during the 1911 and 1912 seasons. He also attended Santa Clara University and was the brother of George Hogan.

In 238 games over two seasons, Hogan posted a .236 batting average (194-for-822) with 86 runs, 3 home runs, 100 RBI, 35 stolen bases and 77 bases on balls.
