= Guy Tutwiler =

American baseball player (1888–1930)

George Tutwiler
- First baseman, outfielder
- Born: July 17, 1888; Coalburg, Alabama, US
- Died: August 15, 1930 (aged 42); Anniston, Alabama, US
- Batted: Left Threw: Right

MLB debut
- August 29, 1911, for the Detroit Tigers

Last MLB appearance
- September 6, 1913, for the Detroit Tigers

MLB statistics
- Batting average: .203
- Hits: 16
- Runs batted in: 10
- Stats at Baseball Reference

Teams
- Detroit Tigers (1911, 1913)

Guy Isbel Tutwiler (July 17, 1888 – August 15, 1930), nicknamed "King Tut", was an American baseball player. Between 1910 and 1924, he appeared in more than 1,500 games as professional baseball player, including more than 600 games as an outfielder and more than 125 games as a first baseman. He played in Major League Baseball for 27 of those games with the Detroit Tigers in 1911 and 1913. The bulk of his career was in the minor leagues, including five seasons with the Providence Grays.

== Early years ==
Tutwiler was born in Coalburg, Alabama, in 1888.

== Professional baseball ==
Tutwiler appeared in 27 major league games, including 14 as a first baseman, six as a second baseman, and three as an outfielder. In his major league career, Tutwiler had a batting average of .203 with 16 hits, seven runs scored, 10 runs batted in, six walks, 12 doubles, two stolen bases, and one triple. He also played 13 seasons in the minor leagues, including stints with the Hattiesburg Timberjacks (1910–1911), Chattanooga Lookouts (1912), Providence Grays (1912, 1914–1917), Mobile Bears (1919–1920), Little Rock Travelers (1921), Memphis Chickasaws (1922) and Augusta Tygers (1924). His batting average in the minor leagues was .291. His most productive year as a baseball player was 1913 when he compiled a .345 batting average, .552 slugging percentage and 57 extra base hits in 115 games with the Fort Wayne Champs.

== Family and later years ==
Tutwiler was married to Edna Mae Scruggs, and they had two sons, Guy Tutwiler Jr. and Pickens McQueen Tutwiler. He died in 1930 at age 42 in a train accident in Birmingham, Alabama.
