= Paul Meloan =

American baseball player (1888–1950)

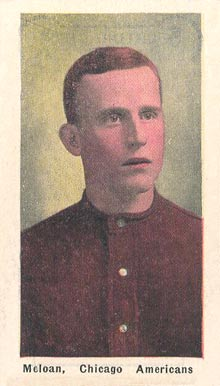
- Right fielder
- Born: August 23, 1888; Paynesville, Missouri, U.S.
- Died: February 11, 1950 (aged 61); Taft, California, U.S.
- Batted: Left Threw: Right

MLB debut
- August 2, 1910, for the Chicago White Sox

Last MLB appearance
- September 12, 1911, for the St. Louis Browns

MLB statistics
- Batting average: .253
- Home runs: 3
- Runs batted in: 38
- Stats at Baseball Reference

Teams
- Chicago White Sox (1910–1911); St. Louis Browns (1911)

Paul B. Meloan (August 23, 1888 – February 11, 1950) was an American Major League Baseball right fielder with the Chicago White Sox and St. Louis Browns. 'Molly', as his teammates dubbed him, batted left-handed and threw right-handed. He attended Washington University in St. Louis, where he played for the Washington University Bears.
