= Biff Schaller =

American baseball player (1889–1939)

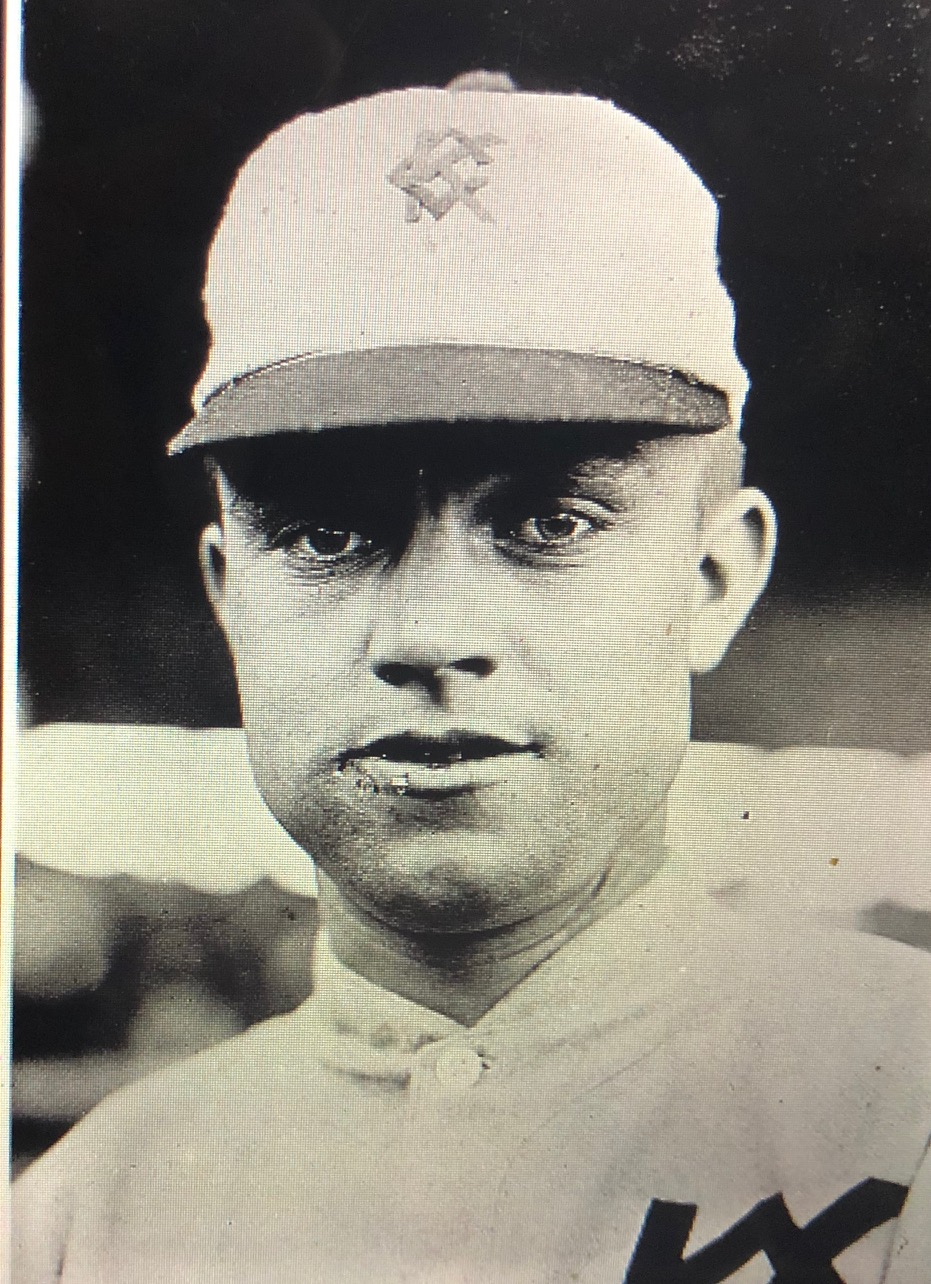
- Schaller with Kansas City, 1912
- Outfielder
- Born: September 23, 1889; Chicago, Illinois
- Died: October 9, 1939 (aged 50); Emeryville, California
- Batted: Left Threw: Right

MLB debut
- April 30, 1911, for the Detroit Tigers

Last MLB appearance
- July 21, 1913, for the Chicago White Sox

MLB statistics
- Batting average: .186
- Hits: 29
- RBIs: 11
- Stats at Baseball Reference

Teams
- Detroit Tigers (1911); Chicago White Sox (1913)

Walter "Biff" Schaller (September 23, 1889 – October 9, 1939) was an American baseball outfielder. He played professional baseball for 11 seasons from 1910 to 1920, including two seasons in Major League Baseball for the Detroit Tigers in 1911 and the Chicago White Sox in 1913 and seven seasons in the Pacific Coast League from 1913 to 1917 and 1919 to 1920.

== Early years ==
Schaller was born in 1889 in Chicago.

== Professional baseball ==
He played professional baseball for 11 seasons from 1910 to 1920, including two seasons in Major League Baseball for the Detroit Tigers in 1911 and the Chicago White Sox in 1913. For Detroit, Schaller appeared in seven games in left field, nine in center field, one at first base, and 23 as a pinch hitter. He had a .133 batting average in 60 at bats for the Tigers, and was released after one season. In 1913, Schaller got a second shot with the White Sox. He hit .219 in 96 at-bats, playing 32 games in the outfield.

He also played two seasons in the American Association for the Kansas City Blues (1911-1912) and seven seasons in the Pacific Coast League for the San Francisco Seals (1913–17, 1919), Seattle Rainiers (1919), and Portland Beavers (1919-1920). Between 1914 and 1917, he appeared in 807 games for the Seals. During this period, he set a Coast League record by appearing in 642 consecutive games.

Schaller was known for his misuse of the English language. He once blamed a batting slump by noting that "the high multitude of Salt Lake City bothers me." He once summarized baseball philosophy as follows: "What's the use to get excited. It's either dis or dat."

== Family and later years ==
Schaller lived in Emeryville, California, for the last 15 years of his life. He operated a bar in the Oakland area. He and his wife, Lucille, had a daughter, Lorraine. In October 1939, Schaller died of a heart attack after eating dinner at his home in Emeryville. He was buried at Mountain View Cemetery in Oakland, California.
