= Pug Cavet =

American baseball player (1889–1966)

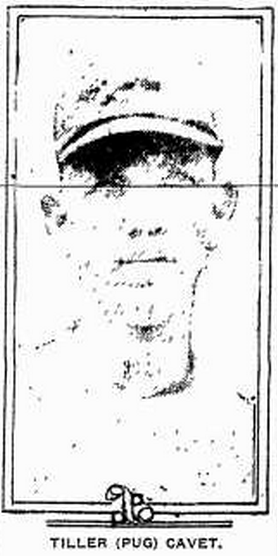
- Pitcher
- Born: December 26, 1889; McGregor, Texas, U.S.
- Died: August 4, 1966 (aged 76); San Luis Obispo, California, U.S.
- Batted: Left Threw: Left

MLB debut
- April 25, 1911, for the Detroit Tigers

Last MLB appearance
- July 10, 1915, for the Detroit Tigers

MLB statistics
- Win–loss record: 11–9
- Earned run average: 2.98
- Strikeouts: 78
- Stats at Baseball Reference

Teams
- Detroit Tigers (1911, 1914–1915)

Tillar H. "Pug" Cavet (December 26, 1889 – August 4, 1966) was an American Major League Baseball pitcher who played three seasons for the Detroit Tigers in 1911, 1914, and 1915. He also played 22 seasons in the minor leagues from 1908 to 1930, compiling a minor league record of 291–243.

== Early years ==
Cavet was born in McGregor, Texas, in December 1889. He was the son of Henry J. Cavet and Emma Earl Cobb. At the time of the 1900 United States census, Cavet was living with his grandparents, parents, three younger brothers, and a younger sister on the family farm in the Justice Precinct of McLennan County, Texas.

== Major League Baseball ==
Cavet appeared in 49 games for the Detroit Tigers, 22 as a starter and 27 as a relief pitcher. He had a career record of 11–9 with eight complete games, one shutout, and an earned run average of 2.98 in 226-1/3 innings. His best year was 1914 when he played in 31 games, pitched 151-1/3 innings and had an ERA of 2.44. He was among the American League leaders in 1914 in both games finished (13) and hit batsmen (9).

On September 15, 1914, Cavet was the pitcher when Nap Lajoie hit his 3,000th hit to become the third player to reach that mark. Honus Wagner and Cap Anson reached the mark before Lajoie. Cavet and the Tigers won the game 2–1.

== Minor League Baseball ==
Cavet also played 22 seasons in the minor leagues from 1908 to 1930. His longest stay was six years with the Indianapolis Indians from 1918 to 1923. He also had his best years at Indianapolis, compiling records of 28–16 in 1919 and 23–16 in 1921. He also had 20-win seasons for the Mobile Sea Gulls in 1913 (23–12) and the Nashville Volunteers in 1917 (21–13). In 22 minor league season, he compiled an overall record of 291–243.

While playing for Indianapolis, he became one of the few pitchers in professional baseball history to record a loss without throwing a pitch. Cavet appeared in relief in the bottom of the ninth inning of a tie game with two outs and a man on third base. The winning run scored when Cavet was called for a balk while winding up to throw his first pitch.

== Family and later years ==
At the time of the 1920 United States census, Cavet was living with his wife, May, in Tulia, Texas. His occupation was listed as professional baseball player.

Cavet died in 1966 at age 76 in San Luis Obispo, California. He is buried at the Odd Fellows Cemetery in San Luis Obispo, California.
