= 1911 in baseball =

The following are the baseball events of the year 1911 throughout the world.

== Champions ==
- World Series: Philadelphia Athletics over New York Giants (4–2)

== Awards and honors ==
- Chalmers Award
  - Ty Cobb, Detroit Tigers, OF
  - Wildfire Schulte, Chicago Cubs, OF

== Statistical leaders ==
	American League		National League	
Stat	Player	Total	Player	Total
AVG	Ty Cobb (DET)	.419	Honus Wagner (PIT)	.334
HR	Home Run Baker (PHA)	11	Frank Schulte (CHC)	21
RBI	Ty Cobb (DET)	127	Frank Schulte (CHC); Owen Wilson (PIT)	107
W	Jack Coombs (PHA)	28	Grover Alexander (PHI)	28
ERA	Vean Gregg (CLE)	1.80	Christy Mathewson (NYG)	1.99
K	Ed Walsh (CWS)	255	Rube Marquard (NYG)	237

== Major league baseball final standings ==
=== American League final standings ===
American League
Team	W	L	Pct.	GB	Home	Road
Philadelphia Athletics	101	50	.669	—	54‍–‍20	47‍–‍30
Detroit Tigers	89	65	.578	13½	51‍–‍25	38‍–‍40
Cleveland Naps	80	73	.523	22	46‍–‍30	34‍–‍43
Boston Red Sox	78	75	.510	24	39‍–‍37	39‍–‍38
Chicago White Sox	77	74	.510	24	40‍–‍37	37‍–‍37
New York Highlanders	76	76	.500	25½	36‍–‍40	40‍–‍36
Washington Senators	64	90	.416	38½	39‍–‍38	25‍–‍52
St. Louis Browns	45	107	.296	56½	25‍–‍53	20‍–‍54

Locations of teams for the 1911 American League season
American League

=== National League final standings ===
National League
Team	W	L	Pct.	GB	Home	Road
New York Giants	99	54	.647	—	49‍–‍25	50‍–‍29
Chicago Cubs	92	62	.597	7½	49‍–‍32	43‍–‍30
Pittsburgh Pirates	85	69	.552	14½	48‍–‍29	37‍–‍40
Philadelphia Phillies	79	73	.520	19½	42‍–‍34	37‍–‍39
St. Louis Cardinals	75	74	.503	22	36‍–‍38	39‍–‍36
Cincinnati Reds	70	83	.458	29	38‍–‍42	32‍–‍41
Brooklyn Trolley Dodgers	64	86	.427	33½	31‍–‍42	33‍–‍44
Boston Rustlers	44	107	.291	54	19‍–‍54	25‍–‍53

Locations of teams for the 1911 National League season
National League

== Events ==
=== April ===
- April 8 – The Cincinnati Reds, in need of pitching help, sign Jesse Tannehill out of retirement. Tannehill pitches one game, coming on in relief of Art Fromme in the Reds 14–0 loss to the Pittsburgh Pirates. Tannehill is released two days later, ending his MLB career.

=== May ===
- May 13:
  - Ty Cobb of the Detroit Tigers hits his first career grand slam. After six innings, Detroit leads the Boston Red Sox, 10–1. Nevertheless, Boston comes back to win the game 13–11 in 10 innings.
  - The New York Giants score a Major League record 10 runs before the St. Louis Cardinals retire the first batter in the first inning. Fred Merkle drives in six of the Giants' 13 runs in the first en route to a 19–5 victory. When Giants manager John McGraw decides to save starting pitcher Christy Mathewson for another day, Rube Marquard enters the game in the second inning and sets a record for relievers (since broken) with 14 strikeouts in his eight-inning relief appearance.
- May 14 – In their first Sunday home game, the Cleveland Naps defeat the New York Highlanders, 16–3, before a crowd of nearly 16,000 spectators. Cleveland's George Stovall leads the offense with 4 hits.
- May 22 – The Philadelphia Phillies are awarded pitcher "Sleepy Bill" Burns off waivers from the Cincinnati Reds.

=== June ===
- June 2 – The Washington Nationals purchase the contract of outfielder Tillie Walker from Spartanburg of the Carolina Association League.
- June 18 – The Detroit Tigers staged the biggest comeback in Major League history after overcoming a 13–1 deficit (after 5½ innings) to defeat the Chicago White Sox by a score of 16–15.
- June 27 – Stuffy McInnis of the Philadelphia Athletics hits a warm-up pitch by Boston Red Sox pitcher Ed Karger for an inside-the-park home run.
- June 28 – The new Polo Grounds, a horseshoe-shaped structure, opens.

=== July ===
- July 12 – Ty Cobb of the Detroit Tigers steals second, third and home on consecutive pitches by Philadelphia Athletics pitcher Harry Krause.
- July 18 – The Wyoming State Penitentiary All Stars play their first game.
- July 19 – Former circus acrobat Walter Carlisle completed an unassisted triple play for the Vernon Tigers of the Pacific Coast League. With the score tied at 3–3 in the sixth inning, and men on first and second base, Carlisle made a spectacular diving catch of a short fly by batter Roy Akin; stepped on second to retire Charlie Moore, and tagged George Metzger coming from first. The Tigers won the game, 5–4. With his heroic feat, the speedy English-born Carlisle entered the records books as the only outfielder ever to make an unassisted triple play in organized baseball.
- July 24 – An American League all-star team – including Walter Johnson, Hal Chase, and Smokey Joe Wood – plays the Cleveland Naps in the Addie Joss Benefit Game and win 5–3. $12,914.60 is raised for the widow of Addie Joss.
- July 29 – In the first game of a doubleheader, Smoky Joe Wood pitches a no-hitter against the St. Louis Browns in a 5–0 Boston Red Sox victory.

=== August ===
- August 11 – The Cleveland Naps release pitcher Cy Young. Young is signed by the Boston Rustlers one week later.
- August 27 – Ed Walsh of the Chicago White Sox pitches a 5–0 no-hitter against the Boston Red Sox.
- August 29 – The Wyoming State Penitentiary All Stars play their final game.

=== September ===
- September 12 – In the nightcap of a game billed as a pitchers' duel, Boston Rustlers' Cy Young and the New York Giants' Christy Mathewson face each other before 10,000 fans, Boston's largest crowd of the year. Young gives up three home runs and nine runs in less than three innings. After the Giants build a 9–0 lead, Giants' manager John McGraw lifts Mathewson, who pitched just two innings, preferring to save his ace for the pennant race against the Chicago Cubs and the Philadelphia Phillies. This is the only time the two future Hall of Fame pitchers ever face each other.
- September 22 – Cy Young of the Boston Rustlers pitches a shutout for the 511th and final victory of his career, in a 1–0 victory over the Pittsburgh Pirates.

=== October ===
- October 7 – In their last game at Huntington Avenue Grounds, the Boston Red Sox defeat the Washington Senators 8-1 in front of just 850 fans. Boston would play the next season at Fenway Park, which remains their home to this day.
- October 22 – The World Series between the New York Giants and the Philadelphia Athletics was resumed after six days of rain, and Chief Bender beat Christy Mathewson, 4–2, to give the Athletics a 3–1 lead.
- October 26 – The Philadelphia Athletics defeat the New York Giants, 13–2, in Game 6 of the World Series to win their second consecutive World Championship title. Philadelphia wins the series, four games to two. The six consecutive days of rain between Games 3 and 4 caused the longest delay between World Series games until the Loma Prieta earthquake interrupted the 1989 Series, which incidentally featured the same two franchises, albeit on the west coast.

=== November ===
- November 10 – Clark Griffith becomes a club owner and president when he joins Philadelphia grain broker William Richardson in buying controlling interest in the Washington Senators for $175,000. Griffith, unable to get financial help from the American League, mortgages his ranch in Montana to raise funds.

=== December ===
- December 1 – Future Hall of Famer Walter Alston is born in Venice, Ohio. Although Alston will come to bat only once during a brief major league career, he will have far greater longevity as the manager of the Dodgers from 1954 to 1976.

== Births ==
=== January ===
- January 1 – Hank Greenberg
- January 4 – Izzy León
- January 5 – Ted Petoskey
- January 9 – Jim Tyack
- January 11 – Roy Hughes
- January 14 – Hank Gornicki
- January 16 – Hank McDonald
- January 17 – Hank Leiber
- January 18 – Pinky May
- January 30 – Bob Katz
- January 30 – Link Wasem

=== February ===
- February 8 – Rae Blaemire
- February 8 – Don Heffner
- February 11 – Yank Terry
- February 13 – Herb Hash
- February 14 – Bill Marshall
- February 22 – Bill Baker
- February 24 – Nig Lipscomb
- February 24 – Johnny Oulliber
- February 25 – Roy Weir
- February 26 – Bill Starr

=== March ===
- March 5 – Earl Browne
- March 7 – Andrew Porter
- March 18 – Al Benton
- March 20 – Charlie Moss
- March 23 – Sig Broskie
- March 24 – Jim Bucher
- March 27 – Walter Stephenson
- March 28 – Clarence Pickrel

=== April ===
- April 1 – Bob Brown
- April 2 – Cotton Pippen
- April 10 – Roger Wolff
- April 13 – Woody Upchurch
- April 22 – Jake Daniel
- April 25 – Bobby Estalella
- April 25 – Connie Marrero

=== May ===
- May 7 – Steve Wylie
- May 10 – Roland Gladu
- May 12 – Archie McKain
- May 15 – Howie Storie
- May 18 – Al Niemiec
- May 19 – Nubs Kleinke
- May 20 – Bert Delmas
- May 21 – Irv Stein

=== June ===
- June 1 – Lou Tost
- June 7 – Ralph Buxton
- June 8 – Van Mungo
- June 9 – Frank McCormick
- June 17 – Byron Humphrey
- June 18 – Russ Hodges
- June 25 – Tony Parisse
- June 28 – Jim Hitchcock

=== July ===
- July 7 – Red Nonnenkamp
- July 11 – Vito Tamulis
- July 14 – Julio Bonetti
- July 22 – Lindsay Brown
- July 28 – Joe Martin
- July 29 – Roy Henshaw

=== August ===
- August 3 – Art Evans
- August 4 – Tuck Stainback
- August 9 – Justin Stein
- August 10 – Taffy Wright
- August 15 – Mort Flohr
- August 16 – Herman Besse
- August 21 – Tom Cafego
- August 22 – Herman Fink
- August 23 – Nels Potter
- August 25 – Fred Frink

=== September ===
- September 3 – Lindsay Deal
- September 4 – Roy Vaughn
- September 5 – Buddy Hassett
- September 6 – Harry Danning
- September 6 – Vallie Eaves
- September 10 – Johnnie Chambers
- September 18 – Tommy de la Cruz
- September 25 – Bill Atwood
- September 27 – Dick Lanahan
- September 29 – Dan McGee

=== October ===
- October 12 – Red Bullock
- October 28 – Lloyd Davenport

=== November ===
- November 1 – Art Parks
- November 2 – Red Jones
- November 3 – John Keane
- November 6 – Frank Gabler
- November 7 – Herb Crompton
- November 9 – Ed Linke
- November 13 – John Mihalic
- November 13 – Buck O'Neil
- November 16 – Clay Bryant
- November 24 – Joe Medwick
- November 28 – Bill DeLancey
- November 28 – Emory Long
- November 29 – Harry Boyles

=== December ===
- December 1 – Walter Alston
- December 1 – Junie Barnes
- December 5 – Stu Flythe
- December 5 – Don Padgett
- December 5 – Dick Stone
- December 7 – Denny Galehouse
- December 7 – Don Johnson
- December 18 – Coaker Triplett
- December 21 – Nino Bongiovanni
- December 21 – Josh Gibson
- December 29 – Bill Knickerbocker

== Deaths ==
=== January–March ===
- January 18 – Dick Scott, 27, pitcher for the 1901 Cincinnati Reds.
- February 5 – Dad Clarkson, 44, pitcher who posted a 39–39 record and a 4.90 ERA for four different teams from 1891 to 1896.
- February 18 – Buttons Briggs, 35, pitcher for the Chicago Colts/Orphans/Cubs 1896–1898, and 1904–1905.
- March 10 – Guy McFadden, 38, first baseman for the 1895 St. Louis Browns of the National League.
- March 12 – Simon Nicholls, 28, shortstop for the Detroit Tigers, Philadelphia Athletics and Cleveland Naps between the 1906 and 1909 seasons.
- March 24 – Stanley Robison, 56, co-owner (with his brother Frank) of the Cleveland Spiders (1897–1899) and St. Louis Cardinals (1899–1908), then sole owner of Cardinals from September 25, 1908 until his death; his niece Helene inherited the Cardinals, to become the first woman to own an MLB franchise.

=== April–June ===
- April 5 – Frank Hankinson, 54, third baseman and pitcher who played from 1878 through 1888 with the White Stockings, Blues, Trojans, Gothams. Metropolitan and Cowboys.
- April 14 – Addie Joss, 31, pitcher for Cleveland who won 20 games four times (1905–1908), led American League in ERA twice with a career 1.89 ERA, including one-hitter in major league debut, one no-hitter and a perfect game.
- April 23 – George Craig, 23, pitcher for the 1907 Philadelphia Athletics.
- April 25 – Jack Rowe, 54, catcher and shortstop for Buffalo and Detroit who batted .300 four times, led NL in triples in 1881; did not strike out in entire 1882 season, later a minor league manager
- May 26 – Billy O'Brien, 51, third baseman for four teams in two different leagues from 1884 to 1890, who topped the Nationel League batters with 19 home runs in 1887.
- June 3 – Dad Clarke, 46, who pitched from 1888 to 1898 for the White Stockings/Solons/Giants/Colonels, going 44–51 with a 4.17 ERA.
- June 23 – John O'Rourke, 59, center fielder who hit .295 in 290 games with the Boston Red Caps (1879–1880) and New York Metropolitans (1883), leading the National League with a .521 slugging in 1879.

=== July–September ===
- July 4 – Jimmy Mathison, 32, third baseman for the 1902 Baltimore Orioles.
- July 26 – John Radcliff, 65, shortstop for five seasons in the National Association.
- August 5 – Bob Caruthers, 47, pitcher who compiled the highest career winning percentage among major leaguers with 250 decisions; led American Association with 40 victories in both 1885 and 1889, pacing St. Louis and Brooklyn to respective pennants; batted .300 twice, later an umpire
- August 8 – Joe Walsh, 46, infielder for the 1881 Baltimore Orioles of the American Association.
- August 10 – Charles Hunt Porter, 68, Massachusetts businessman and politician who was president of the Boston Red Stockings of the National Association, predecessor of the modern Atlanta Braves franchise, in 1873 and 1874.
- August 31 – Will White, 56, pitcher who won over 200 games for Cincinnati teams in 10-year career, led league in wins and strikeouts twice each; first major leaguer to wear eyeglasses, and batterymate of brother Deacon from 1877 to 1879.

=== September–December ===
- October 1 – Leo Hafford, 28, pitcher for the 1906 Cincinnati Reds.
- October 4 – Emil Geiss, 44, infielder/pitcher for the 1887 Chicago White Stockings.
- October 6 – Larry Murphy, 54, Canadian outfielder for the 1891 for the Washington Statesmen.
- October 10 – Bill Parks, 62, pitcher and left fielder for three teams from 1875 to 1876. Managed the 1875 Washington Nationals for eight games in 1875.
- October 19 – Marshall King, 61, outfielder who played from 1867 to 1872 for the Haymakers, White Stockings and Haymakers.
- October 25 – Chris Rickley, 52, shortstop for the 1884 for the Philadelphia Keystones of the Union Association.
- November 4 – Warren Burtis, 63, National League umpire in 1876 and 1877.
- November 8 – Oscar Bielaski, 64, right fielder for five seasons, from 1872 to 1876, who was on the 1876 National League champion Chicago White Stockings.
- November 8 – Frank Gatins, 40, infielder for the Washington Senators (1898) and Brooklyn Superbas (1901).
- November 21 – William Hepburn Russell, 54, co-owner of the Boston Rustlers from December 17, 1910 until his death.
- November 22 – Ed Cermak, 30, outfielder for the 1901 Cleveland Blues of the American League.
- November 6 – John Hamill, 40, pitcher for the 1884 Washington Nationals.
- December 6 – Ed Glenn, 36, National League shortstop who played between 1898 and 1902 with the Washington Senators, New York Giants and Chicago Orphans.
- December 31 – Pete Gilbert, 43, third baseman for the Orioles/Grooms/Colonels American Association teams from 1890 to 1894.
