= 1911 St. Louis Browns season =

Major League Baseball season

1911 St. Louis Browns
- League: American League
- Ballpark: Sportsman's Park
- City: St. Louis, Missouri
- Record: 45–107 (.296)
- League place: 8th
- Owners: Robert Hedges
- Managers: Bobby Wallace

The 1911 St. Louis Browns season involved the Browns finishing 8th in the American League with a record of 45 wins and 107 losses.

== Regular season ==
=== Season standings ===
American League
Team	W	L	Pct.	GB	Home	Road
Philadelphia Athletics	101	50	.669	—	54‍–‍20	47‍–‍30
Detroit Tigers	89	65	.578	13½	51‍–‍25	38‍–‍40
Cleveland Naps	80	73	.523	22	46‍–‍30	34‍–‍43
Boston Red Sox	78	75	.510	24	39‍–‍37	39‍–‍38
Chicago White Sox	77	74	.510	24	40‍–‍37	37‍–‍37
New York Highlanders	76	76	.500	25½	36‍–‍40	40‍–‍36
Washington Senators	64	90	.416	38½	39‍–‍38	25‍–‍52
St. Louis Browns	45	107	.296	56½	25‍–‍53	20‍–‍54

=== Record vs. opponents ===
1911 American League record Sources:
Team	BOS	CWS	CLE	DET	NYH	PHA	SLB	WSH
Boston	—	11–11	11–11	10–12	12–10	9–13	12–9	13–9
Chicago	11–11	—	6–15–2	8–14	13–9	9–11–1	17–5	13–9
Cleveland	11–11	15–6–2	—	6–16	14–8–1	5–17	15–7	14–8
Detroit	12–10	14–8	16–6	—	7–15	12–10	14–8	14–8
New York	10–12	9–13	8–14–1	15–7	—	6–15	16–5	12–10
Philadelphia	13–9	11–9–1	17–5	10–12	15–6	—	20–2	15–7
St. Louis	9–12	5–17	7–15	8–14	5–16	2–20	—	9–13
Washington	9–13	9–13	8–14	8–14	10–12	7–15	13–9	—

=== Notable transactions ===
- June 1911: Joe Willis was purchased from the Browns by the St. Louis Cardinals.

=== Roster ===
1911 St. Louis Browns
Roster
Pitchers: Mack Allison; Bill Bailey; Curly Brown; Elmer Brown; George Curry; Lefty George; Howie Gregory; Earl Hamilton; Bill Harper; Ed Hawk; Joe Lake; Roy Mitchell; Walter Moser; Red Nelson; Barney Pelty; Jeff Pfeffer; Jack Powell; Joe Willis	Catchers: Nig Clarke; Paul Krichell; Clyde Southwick; Jim Stephens; Infielders: Jimmy Austin; John Black; Al Clancy; Dode Criss; Jim Duggan; Ernie Gust; Ed Hallinan; Joe Kutina; Frank LaPorte; Allie Moulton; Hap Myers; Pat Newnam; Dave Rowan; Bobby Wallace	Outfielders: Pete Compton; Danny Hoffman; Willie Hogan; Paul Meloan; Jim Murray; Al Schweitzer; Burt Shotton; Gus Williams; Other batters: Joe Crisp; Frank Truesdale	Manager: Bobby Wallace

== Player stats ==
=== Batting ===
==== Starters by position ====
Note: Pos = Position; G = Games played; AB = At bats; H = Hits; Avg. = Batting average; HR = Home runs; RBI = Runs batted in

Pos	Player	G	AB	H	Avg.	HR	RBI
C	Nig Clarke	82	256	55	.215	0	18
1B	John Black	54	186	28	.151	0	7
2B	Frank LaPorte	136	507	159	.314	2	82
SS	Bobby Wallace	125	410	95	.232	0	31
3B	Jimmy Austin	148	541	141	.261	2	45
OF	Al Schweitzer	76	237	51	.215	0	34
OF	Burt Shotton	139	572	146	.255	0	36
OF	Willie Hogan	123	443	115	.260	2	62

==== Other batters ====
Note: G = Games played; AB = At bats; H = Hits; Avg. = Batting average; HR = Home runs; RBI = Runs batted in

Player	G	AB	H	Avg.	HR	RBI
Jim Stephens	70	212	49	.231	0	17
Paul Meloan	64	206	54	.262	3	14
Ed Hallinan	52	169	35	.207	0	14
Pete Compton	28	107	29	.271	0	5
Jim Murray	31	102	19	.186	3	11
Joe Kutina	26	101	26	.257	3	15
Dode Criss	58	83	21	.253	2	15
Paul Krichell	28	82	19	.232	0	8
Danny Hoffman	24	81	17	.210	0	7
Dave Rowan	18	65	25	.385	0	11
Pat Newnam	20	62	12	.194	0	5
Hap Myers	11	37	11	.297	0	1
Gus Williams	7	26	7	.269	0	4
Allie Moulton	4	15	1	.067	0	1
Clyde Southwick	4	12	3	.250	0	0
Ernie Gust	3	12	0	.000	0	0
Jim Duggan	1	4	0	.000	0	0
Joe Crisp	1	1	1	1.000	0	0
Frank Truesdale	1	0	0	----	0	0

=== Pitching ===
==== Starting pitchers ====
Note: G = Games pitched; IP = Innings pitched; W = Wins; L = Losses; ERA = Earned run average; SO = Strikeouts

Player	G	IP	W	L	ERA	SO
Joe Lake	30	215.1	10	15	3.30	69
Jack Powell	31	207.2	8	19	3.29	52
Barney Pelty	28	197.0	7	15	2.97	59
Red Nelson	16	81.0	3	9	5.22	24
Ed Hawk	5	37.2	0	4	3.35	14
Mack Allison	3	26.1	2	1	2.05	2
George Curry	3	15.2	0	3	7.47	2
Joe Willis	1	7.0	0	1	5.14	0
Walter Moser	2	3.1	0	2	21.60	2

==== Other pitchers ====
Note: G = Games pitched; IP = Innings pitched; W = Wins; L = Losses; ERA = Earned run average; SO = Strikeouts

Player	G	IP	W	L	ERA	SO
Earl Hamilton	32	177.0	5	12	3.97	55
Roy Mitchell	28	133.1	4	8	3.85	40
Lefty George	27	116.1	4	9	4.18	23
Bill Bailey	7	31.2	0	3	4.55	8
Curly Brown	3	23.0	1	2	2.74	8
Dode Criss	4	18.1	0	2	8.35	9
Elmer Brown	5	16.2	1	1	6.48	5
Howie Gregory	3	7.0	0	1	5.14	1

==== Relief pitchers ====
Note: G = Games pitched; W = Wins; L = Losses; SV = Saves; ERA = Earned run average; SO = Strikeouts

Player	G	W	L	SV	ERA	SO
Jeff Pfeffer	2	0	0	0	7.20	4
Bill Harper	2	0	0	0	6.75	6
