= 1951 in baseball =

The following are the baseball events of the year 1951 throughout the world.

== Headline Event of the Year ==
Baseball's Shot Heard 'Round the World gives the New York Giants the National League Pennant in the third game of a best-of-three-games tiebreaker series over the Brooklyn Dodgers.

Although the Negro American League would last until 1960, 1951 was, notably, the last season in which the Negro American League was considered major-league caliber, which was itself the last major Negro league baseball organization.

== Champions ==
=== Major League Baseball ===
- World Series: New York Yankees over New York Giants (4–2)
- All-Star Game, July 10 at Briggs Stadium: National League, 8–3

=== Other champions ===
- All-American Girls Professional Baseball League: South Bend Blue Sox
- Amateur World Series: Puerto Rico
- College World Series: Oklahoma
- Japan Series: Yomiuri Giants over Nankai Hawks (4–2)
- Little League World Series: Stamford, Connecticut
- Pan American Games: Cuba over USA

Winter Leagues

- Caribbean Series: Cangrejeros de Santurce
- Cuban League: Leones del Habana
- Mexican Pacific League: Tacuarineros de Culiacán
- Panamanian League: Spur Cola Colonites
- Puerto Rican League: Cangrejeros de Santurce
- Venezuelan League: Navegantes del Magallanes

== Awards and honors ==
- Baseball Hall of Fame
  - Mel Ott
  - Jimmie Foxx
- Most Valuable Player
  - Roy Campanella (BRO, National)
  - Yogi Berra (NYY, American)
- Rookie of the Year
  - Willie Mays (NYG, National)
  - Gil McDougald (NYY, American)
- The Sporting News Player of the Year Award
  - Stan Musial (STL)
- The Sporting News Pitcher of the Year Award
  - Preacher Roe (BRO, National)
  - Bob Feller (CLE, American)
- The Sporting News Manager of the Year Award
  - Leo Durocher (NYG)

== Statistical leaders ==
Any team shown in small text indicates a previous team a player was on during the season.

	American League		National League	
Stat	Player	Total	Player	Total
AVG	Ferris Fain (PHA)	.344	Stan Musial (STL)	.355
HR	Gus Zernial (PHA/CWS)	33	Ralph Kiner (PIT)	42
RBI	Gus Zernial (PHA/CWS)	129	Monte Irvin (NYG)	121
W	Bob Feller (CLE)	22	Larry Jansen (NYG); Sal Maglie (NYG)	23
ERA	Saul Rogovin (CWS/DET)	2.78	Chet Nichols Jr. (BSN)	2.88
K	Vic Raschi (NYY)	164	Don Newcombe (BRO); Warren Spahn (BSN)	164

== Major league baseball final standings ==
=== American League final standings ===
American League
Team	W	L	Pct.	GB	Home	Road
New York Yankees	98	56	.636	—	56‍–‍22	42‍–‍34
Cleveland Indians	93	61	.604	5	53‍–‍24	40‍–‍37
Boston Red Sox	87	67	.565	11	50‍–‍25	37‍–‍42
Chicago White Sox	81	73	.526	17	39‍–‍38	42‍–‍35
Detroit Tigers	73	81	.474	25	36‍–‍41	37‍–‍40
Philadelphia Athletics	70	84	.455	28	38‍–‍41	32‍–‍43
Washington Senators	62	92	.403	36	32‍–‍44	30‍–‍48
St. Louis Browns	52	102	.338	46	24‍–‍53	28‍–‍49

Locations of teams for the 1942–1953 American League seasons
American League

=== National League final standings ===
National League
Team	W	L	Pct.	GB	Home	Road
New York Giants	98	59	.624	—	50‍–‍28	48‍–‍31
Brooklyn Dodgers	97	60	.618	1	49‍–‍29	48‍–‍31
St. Louis Cardinals	81	73	.526	15½	44‍–‍34	37‍–‍39
Boston Braves	76	78	.494	20½	42‍–‍35	34‍–‍43
Philadelphia Phillies	73	81	.474	23½	38‍–‍39	35‍–‍42
Cincinnati Reds	68	86	.442	28½	35‍–‍42	33‍–‍44
Pittsburgh Pirates	64	90	.416	32½	32‍–‍45	32‍–‍45
Chicago Cubs	62	92	.403	34½	32‍–‍45	30‍–‍47

Locations of teams for the 1943–1952 National League seasons
National League

== All-American Girls Professional Baseball League final standings ==
=== First half ===
Rank	Team	W	L	Pct.	GB
1	Grand Rapids Chicks	40	13	.755	—
2	Fort Wayne Daisies	34	17	.667	5
3	South Bend Blue Sox	38	22	.633	5½
4	Rockford Peaches	31	26	.544	11
5	Peoria Redwings	28	25	.528	12
6	Kenosha Comets	21	36	.368	21
7	Kalamazoo Lassies	19	38	.333	23
8	Battle Creek Belles	11	45	.196	30½

=== Second half ===
Rank	Team	W	L	Pct.	GB
1	South Bend Blue Sox	38	14	.731	—
2	Rockford Peaches	34	15	.694	2½
3	Fort Wayne Daisies	34	18	.654	4
4	Grand Rapids Chicks	31	22	.585	7½
5	Peoria Redwings	21	31	.404	17
6	Battle Creek Belles	19	35	.352	20
7	Kenosha Comets	15	35	.333	22
8	Kalamazoo Lassies	15	37	.288	23

=== Overall ===
Rank	Team	W	L	Pct.	GB
1	South Bend Blue Sox	76	36	.679	—
2	Grand Rapids Chicks	71	35	.670	2
3	Fort Wayne Daisies	68	35	.660	3½
4	Rockford Peaches	65	41	.613	8
5	Peoria Redwings	49	56	.467	23½
6	Kenosha Comets	36	71	.336	37½
7	Kalamazoo Lassies	34	75	.312	40½
8	Battle Creek Belles	30	80	.273	45

== Nippon Professional Baseball final standings ==
=== Central League final standings ===
Central League	G	W	L	T	Pct.	GB
Yomiuri Giants	114	79	29	6	.731	—
Nagoya Dragons	113	62	48	3	.564	18.0
Osaka Tigers	116	61	52	3	.540	20.5
Shochiku Robins	115	53	57	5	.482	27.0
Kokutetsu Swallows	107	46	59	2	.438	31.5
Taiyo Whales	108	40	64	4	.385	37.0
Hiroshima Carp	99	32	64	3	.333	41.0

=== Pacific League final standings ===
Pacific League	G	W	L	T	Pct.	GB
Nankai Hawks	104	72	24	8	.750	—
Nishitetsu Lions	105	53	42	10	.558	18.5
Mainichi Orions	110	54	51	5	.514	22.5
Daiei Stars	101	41	52	8	.441	29.5
Hankyu Braves	96	37	51	8	.420	31.0
Tokyu Flyers	102	38	56	8	.404	33.0
Kintetsu Pearls	98	37	56	5	.398	33.5

== Events ==
=== January ===
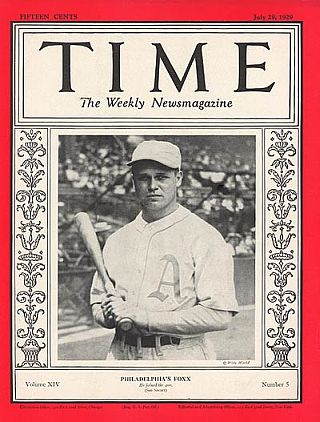
Jimmie Foxx on the cover of TIME, July 29, 1929

- January 23 – Guido Rugo, one of the "Three Little Steam Shovels", the construction magnates who bought the Boston Braves in 1944, sells his interest to majority partner Lou Perini and minority partner Joe Maney.
- January 26 – The BBWAA votes retired sluggers Jimmie Foxx and Mel Ott into the Baseball Hall of Fame. At 534 and 511 career home runs respectively, they are the only men to crack the 500-homer mark—apart from Babe Ruth and his legendary 714 blows.

=== February ===
- February 3 – The 75th birthday of the National League draws 16 of the 23 living members of the Hall of Fame, along with other dignitaries, to a celebration in Manhattan. The attendees include both NL stalwarts such as Fred Clarke, Hugh Duffy, Rogers Hornsby, Carl Hubbell, Kid Nichols, Mel Ott and Pie Traynor, and rival American League stars such as Ty Cobb, Mickey Cochrane, Eddie Collins, Jimmie Foxx, Charlie Gehringer and Tris Speaker—plus Cy Young, whose 511 career wins were composed of 290 in the NL, and 221 in AL. With 1951 also marking the 50th birthday of the "Junior Circuit", both major leagues will commemorate their diamond and golden jubilees with patches stitched to the shirtsleeves of players' uniforms.
- February 5 – California governor Earl Warren dispels the rumor that he is a candidate for the position of Commissioner of Baseball.
- February 26 – At Caracas, Puerto Rico wins the 1951 Caribbean Series as the pitching of Rubén Gómez and two homers from Luis Olmo propel the Cangrejeros de Santurce to their fifth victory in six games. Cuba and the Leones del Habana (4–2) place second. An ecstatic crowd of 40,000 greets the Santurce club at the airport on its return to Puerto Rico.

=== March ===
- March 10 – The owners of the St. Louis Browns reveal plans to mortgage Sportsman's Park and a minor-league facility in San Antonio, Texas, to raise $600,000 to pay off debts, amid rumors the American League club may be sold and moved elsewhere.
- March 12 – For the second time in three months, Commissioner of Baseball Happy Chandler loses his bid for a new contract when he fails to secure the required support of 12 of the 16 MLB owners. The final tally is nine for Chandler, seven against. The former U.S. Senator, who became baseball's second permanent "czar" in April 1945, will serve as "lame duck" commissioner until he steps down July 14.
- March 21 – During spring training, Pittsburgh Pirates left-handed-throwing first baseman Dale Long appears as a catcher in an exhibition game at San Diego, after Pirates general manager Branch Rickey decides to flout tradition. The experiment goes nowhere, with Long appearing almost exclusively as a pinch hitter and playing seven innings at first base before he's sent to the St. Louis Browns on waivers June 1. Long eventually catches catch two innings in 1958 as a member of the Chicago Cubs, using his first baseman's mitt.
- March 30 – Johnny Vander Meer, who had made history as the first and only pitcher in major league history to toss two consecutive no-hitters, is released by the Chicago Cubs. He signs as a free agent with the Cleveland Indians on April 6.

=== April ===
- April 1 – The Cleveland Indians trade third baseman Fred Marsh and $35,000 to the St. Louis Browns for second baseman Snuffy Stirnweiss and shortstop Merl Combs.
- April 17
  - Nineteen-year-old rookie Mickey Mantle makes his MLB debut playing right field and batting third for the New York Yankees in The Bronx against the Boston Red Sox. His sixth-inning single off Bill Wight produces his first-ever hit, RBI and run scored. The Yanks shut out Boston 5–0 behind Vic Raschi.
  - At Shibe Park, the Philadelphia Athletics and the Washington Senators play the first Opening Day night game in American League history. The Senators prevail, 6–1, behind the solid pitching of Cuban 40-year-old Connie Marrero, as his batterymate Mickey Grasso hits a three-run home run. Marrero pitches nine strong innings, allowing one earned run on seven hits and two walks while striking out six batters. Bobby Shantz is the losing pitcher. Marking another milestone, this is the Philadelphia AL franchise's first Opening Day with someone other than legendary Connie Mack at the helm; he had managed the Athletics for 50 years and 7,466 games before his retirement in October 1950 at age 87. Jimmy Dykes, Mack's former stalwart third baseman, runs the Philadelphia bench this season.
  - At Sportsman's Park, the St. Louis Browns are drubbed, 17–3, by the Chicago White Sox in the Brownies' 1951 inaugural. It's a banner day for the last letter of the alphabet, as the ChiSox' Al Zarilla and Gus Zernial each collect four RBIs.
- April 23 – In 16 innings, the Brooklyn Dodgers edge the Boston Braves at Ebbets Field, 2–1.
- April 30 – Three American League clubs combine on a trade, in which the Chicago White Sox obtain future Baseball Hall of Famer Minnie Miñoso from the Cleveland Indians and fellow outfielder Paul Lehner from the Philadelphia Athletics. Simultaneously, the ChiSox send catcher Gus Niarhos and outfielder Dave Philley to Philadelphia, and the Indians obtain pitcher Lou Brissie from the Athletics in exchange for pitcher Sam Zoldak and catcher Ray Murray.

=== May ===
- May 1
  - On Mother's Day, New York Yankees rookie Mickey Mantle hits the first home run of his MLB career off Randy Gumpert in an 8–3 victory over the Chicago White Sox at Comiskey Park. In the same game, Cuban third baseman and former Negro leagues star Minnie Miñoso becomes the first black player in White Sox franchise history. In his first MLB at-bat, Miñoso homers off Yankees' starter Vic Raschi.
  - Umpire Frank Dascoli banishes all 11 players on the Chicago Cubs bench during the fourth inning of the game against the New York Giants, after the Cubs players allegedly call Dascoli "Rabbit Ears". Bill Serena and Smoky Burgess are later allowed to return to the game to pinch hit for the Cubs.
- May 4 – Leading off today's game at the Polo Grounds, Pete Castiglione of the Pittsburgh Pirates triples off Sal Maglie, then scores one out later on a fielder's choice. Castiglione's is the only hit Maglie will allow, as he spins a 5–1 complete-game victory for his New York Giants. Maglie's will be one of 11 one-hitters thrown by MLB hurlers in 1951.
- May 6 – In the second game of a doubleheader at Braves Field, Cliff Chambers pitches a no-hitter, as the Pirates top the Boston Braves, 3–0.
- May 7 – Pitching for the Cleveland Indians, Johnny Vander Meer gives up eight hits and six runs, all of them earned, while striking out two and walking one. Vander Meer, a four-time all star, is relieved by Jerry Fahr after allowing a single to Frank Sacka in Cleveland's 11–10 loss to Washington. It will be Vander Meer's final appearance in the major leagues.
- May 10 – The Cleveland Indians obtain veteran outfielder Sam Chapman from the Philadelphia Athletics for infielder Lou Klein and outfielder Allie Clark.
- May 14 – The New York Yankees trade third baseman Billy Johnson to the St. Louis Cardinals for first baseman Don Bollweg and $15,000. Johnson, 32, has won four World Series rings as a Yankee since 1943.
- May 15
  - The Detroit Tigers trade right-hander Saul Rogovin to the Chicago White Sox for southpaw Bob Cain. On August 19, 1951, Cain will be on the mound at Sportsman's Park during Bill Veeck's most famous promotional stunt.
  - At Fenway Park, the Boston Red Sox celebrate the franchise's 50th anniversary and honor members of the 1901 Boston Americans. Overall, 29 old-timers who played, managed, or umpired in the American League in that first year attend, including Bill Bradley, Tom Connolly, Wid Conroy, Hugh Duffy, Clark Griffith, Dummy Hoy, Connie Mack, Ollie Pickering, Billy Sullivan and Cy Young. Eight of them participated in the first-ever game of the American League, played in Chicago on April 24, 1901. The regular game that follows the ceremony features the 300th career home run of Ted Williams in the fourth inning off Chicago White Sox pitcher Howie Judson. With the game tied at 7–7 in the top of the 11th inning, Nellie Fox hits the first homer of his six-year career, against reliever Ray Scarborough, to give the White Sox and reliever Harry Dorish a 9–7 victory.
- May 16 – The contract of third baseman Bob Dillinger, a speedy .300 hitter and former American League All-Star notorious for lackadaisical play in the field, is sold to the Chicago White Sox by the Pittsburgh Pirates.
- May 17
  - The Boston Red Sox trade pitchers Jim Suchecki and Jim McDonald ("player to be named later"/PTBNL), catcher Matt Batts and $100,000 to the St. Louis Browns for catcher Les Moss.
  - The Pittsburgh Pirates trade shortstop Stan Rojek to the St. Louis Cardinals for first baseman Rocky Nelson and outfielder/infielder/pitcher Erv Dusak.
- May 28
  - After starting his MLB career 0-for-12, rookie New York Giants outfielder Willie Mays gets his first major league hit, a home run off Boston Braves ace Warren Spahn at the Polo Grounds.
  - The Giants sell the contract of second-year outfielder Jack Maguire to the Pittsburgh Pirates. Willie Mays, who was originally issued uniform #14 when he was called up from Minneapolis on May 25, inherits Maguire's #24 and will immortalize the digit for the remainder of his Hall-of-Fame career.
- May 30 – On Memorial Day, the Chicago White Sox sweep the St. Louis Browns in a Comiskey Park doubleheader, 5–2 and 8–1, to extend their winning streak to 14 games dating to May 15. Under first-year manager Paul Richards, the ChiSox are the early surprises of the American League, ending today with a 26–9 (.743) record and a two-game lead over the New York Yankees in the early-season pennant race. In contrast, the 1950 Pale Hose had gone 60–94 and finished sixth.

=== June ===
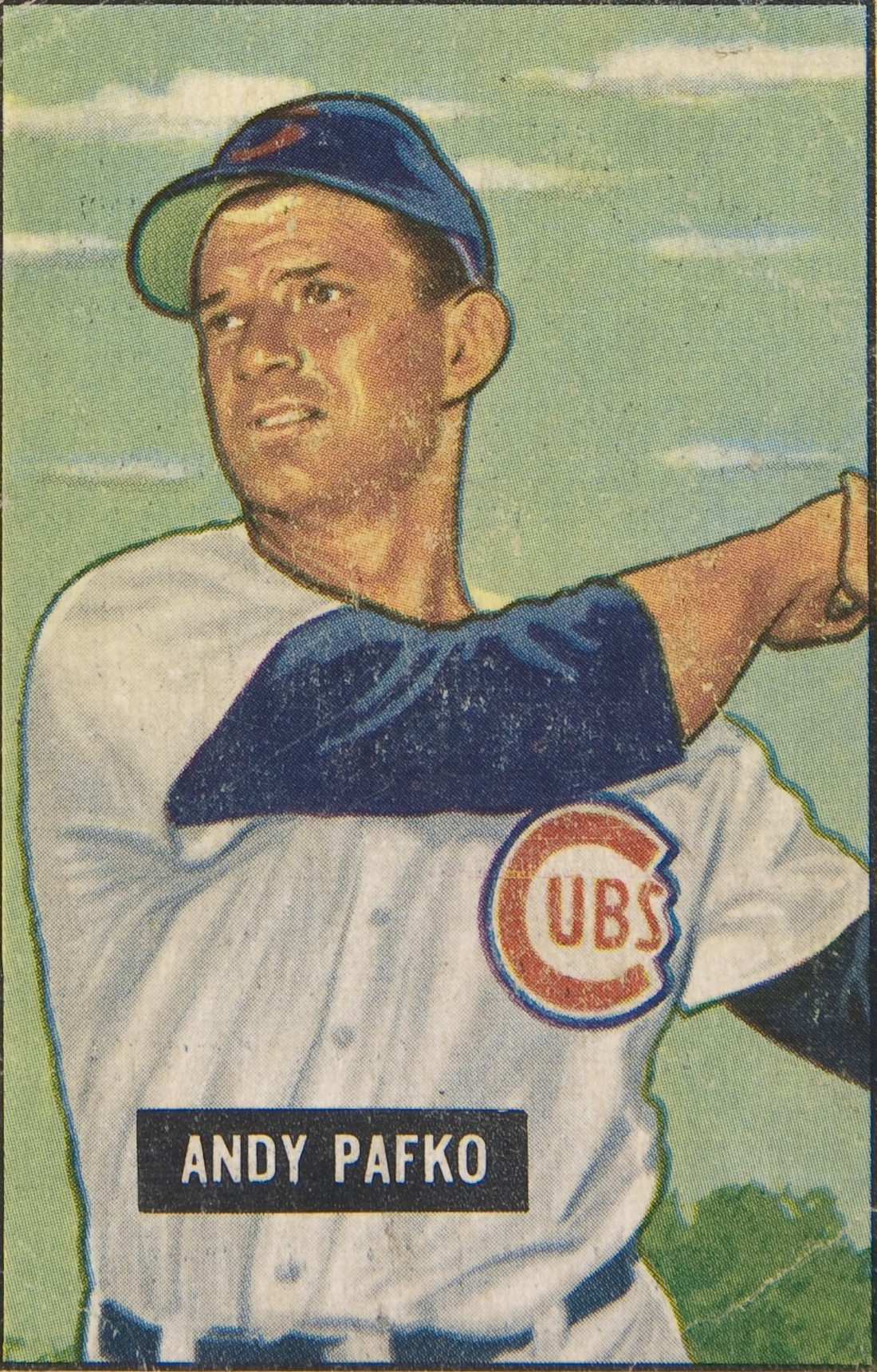
Andy Pafko

- June 4
  - Gus Bell of the Pittsburgh Pirates hits for the cycle, drives in three runs and scores two more, to lead Pittsburgh to a 12–4 victory over the Philadelphia Phillies at Shibe Park. His is the only "cycle" of 1951's NL or AL season.
  - Frank Lane, the prolific trade-maker and general manager of the Chicago White Sox, makes two deals. First, he acquires infielder Kermit Wahl from the Philadelphia Athletics for third baseman Hank Majeski, then he packages Wahl, outfielder Paul Lehner and cash to obtain outfielder Don Lenhardt from the St. Louis Browns.
- June 15
  - At the trading deadline, the Brooklyn Dodgers—already six games in front in the National League standings—get even stronger, acquiring slugging outfielder Andy Pafko from the Chicago Cubs in an eight-player trade. The full transaction sees Brooklyn get five-time All-Star Pafko, pitcher Johnny Schmitz, catcher Rube Walker and infielder Wayne Terwilliger from the Cubs for pitcher Joe Hatten, catcher Bruce Edwards, infielder Eddie Miksis and outfielder Gene Hermanski.
  - The New York Yankees make two deals. They acquire left-hander Bob Kuzava from the Washington Senators for three right-handed hurlers, Tom Ferrick, Bob Porterfield and Fred Sanford. Then the Yankees also obtain southpaw Stubby Overmire from the St. Louis Browns for lefty Tommy Byrne and $25,000.
  - The Pittsburgh Pirates and St. Louis Cardinals make a two for five trade, with the Pirates sending hurler Cliff Chambers and outfielder Wally Westlake to the Cardinals for pitchers Howie Pollet and Ted Wilks, catcher Joe Garagiola, infielder Dick Cole and outfielder Bill Howerton.
- June 19 – Billy Southworth resigns as manager of the Boston Braves with his team tied for fifth place in the National League and 10½ games out of the lead. The Braves promote popular former right fielder Tommy Holmes, 34, from Hartford to replace him. Southworth, 58, retires from managing with a 1,044–704 record over 13 seasons; his .597 winning percentage is fourth-best all-time among pilots with ten seasons of MLB service. He won four NL pennants: three straight (1942–1944) as skipper of the St. Louis Cardinals (along with the 1942 and 1944 World Series); and one with the Braves (in 1948). He will be posthumously elected to the Baseball Hall of Fame in 2008.
- June 22 – Bill Veeck, the flamboyant former owner of the Cleveland Indians, announces that he has purchased controlling interest in the downtrodden St. Louis Browns from owners Bill and Charles DeWitt. Veeck, 37, will complete the transaction July 4 when he acquires additional stock in the Browns to assume 75 percent ownership. He has been out of baseball since 1949, when he sold his share in the Indians during a divorce settlement.
- June 30 – The New York Giants claim utility infielder Hank Schenz on waivers from the Pittsburgh Pirates. Schenz will appear in only eight games while spending the rest of the season on New York's roster; however, decades later, it will be alleged that the spyglass he employs to steal signs will be instrumental in the Giants' white-hot 37–7 late-season winning streak that propels them into the 1951 National League tie-breaker series.

=== July ===
- July 1 – In the first game of a doubleheader, Bob Feller tosses the third no-hitter of his career for the Cleveland Indians in a 2–1 win over the Detroit Tigers.
- July 3 – Former Brooklyn Dodgers ace relief pitcher Hugh Casey, 37, dies from a self-inflicted shotgun blast in his Atlanta hotel room. Despondent over being named in a paternity suit by a Brooklyn woman, he takes his own life while speaking over the telephone to his estranged wife. (See Deaths below.)
- July 4
  - At Ebbets Field, the Dodgers sweep a Fourth of July doubleheader from their archrivals, the New York Giants, 6–5 (11 innings) and 4–2. The twin victories enable the Dodgers (46–26) to widen their National League lead to 6½ games over the second-place Giants (41–34) at the 1951 season's unofficial halfway mark. Meanwhile, in the American League, the Chicago White Sox (46–27) regain a slim, half-game lead when they split a twin bill with the Detroit Tigers, and the onrushing New York Yankees (44–26) are slowed by dropping a doubleheader to the Washington Senators.
  - Ralph Kiner belts two home runs in the second game of a Forbes Field holiday twin bill, enabling his Pittsburgh Pirates to overwhelm the Cincinnati Reds 16–4 in a seven-inning official game halted by rain. The Pirates and Reds split the doubleheader, but Cincinnati manager Luke Sewell protests both contests because Kiner remains in the Bucs' lineup despite being suspended by the National League just before the start of Game 1 for a recent dust-up with umpire Jocko Conlan.
- July 5 – With his estimated $1.5 million purchase completed, Bill Veeck becomes president and 75% owner of the St. Louis Browns. He promises "sweeping changes" for the last-place team, which has also finished last in MLB team attendance for every year since 1946.
- July 7 – In today's 8–6 Cincinnati Reds victory over the Chicago Cubs, every scoring half-inning features two runs.
- July 10 – Exploding for a record four home runs, the National League trounces the American League, 8–3, at the annual All-Star Game, at Briggs Stadium in Detroit. Pittsburgh Pirates' slugger Ralph Kiner hits a home run for the third Midsummer Classic in a row.
- July 12
  - New York Yankees hurler Allie Reynolds pitches a no-hitter against the Cleveland Indians in a 1–0 win.
  - It takes 17 innings to settle a "Battle of the Soxes," but the Boston Red Sox defeat the Chicago White Sox, 5–4, at Comiskey Park. Boston's Ellis Kinder throws ten innings of shutout relief, and Chicago's starting pitcher, Saul Rogovin, goes all 17 innings and ends up with the loss. The win is the Red Sox' seventh straight and gives them a 1½-game lead in the AL standings.
- July 14
  - Although he had vowed to serve out his term "until the last second" when it expires on April 30, 1952, lame-duck Commissioner of Baseball Happy Chandler resigns, leaving the post temporarily vacant. Prominent names such as retired General of the Army Douglas MacArthur are floated as possible successors, but it's quickly reported that MLB owners wish to promote someone from inside the game to replace Kentucky politician Chandler.
  - After pitching for Bill Veeck in Cleveland in 1948–1949, 45-year-old free agent Satchel Paige rejoins him with the St. Louis Browns.
- July 15 – Left-hander Sam Zoldak of the Philadelphia Athletics one-hits the Chicago White Sox, while getting two "knocks" and two RBIs himself. Chico Carrasquel's third-inning single is Chicago's only hit—and Zoldak picks him off first base. The 5–0 win enables the lowly Athletics to sweep the twin bill at Comiskey Park.
- July 19 – Paul Lehner is claimed off waivers by the Cleveland Indians, enabling the veteran outfielder to play for four of the eight American League teams during the 1951 regular season.
- July 21 – The Chicago Cubs (35–45, seventh in the NL) change pilots, replacing former Hall-of-Fame second baseman Frankie Frisch with a player-manager, 35-year-old first baseman Phil Cavarretta. The move signals the end of Frisch's 16-year managing career.
- July 22 – The New York Yankees sweep a Sunday doubleheader from the St. Louis Browns at Sportsman's Park, 9–0 and 7–3, and the Boston Red Sox defeat the Detroit Tigers, 10–9 at Briggs Stadium, in their single game. Coupled with the Chicago White Sox' twin defeats at the hands of the Washington Senators at Griffith Stadium, 7–6 and 11–5, the Yankees pull into a virtual tie for first place with the Red Sox and White Sox.
- July 23 – A "ding-dong" affair at Forbes Field sees the Boston Braves score seven runs in the first inning, and the Pittsburgh Pirates respond with six tallies of their own. The Bucs take the lead 14–11 after six innings, but Boston battles back with four runs in the seventh and eighth, and pulls out a 15–14 win. Of the Braves' 22 hits, the winning blow is an eighth-inning single by Roy Hartsfield.
- July 28
  - The Philadelphia Phillies' starting rotation fires its fourth straight complete-game shutout, all during its mid-summer "Western swing." Today, at Wrigley Field, Russ Meyer spins a seven-hitter to defeat the Chicago Cubs, 1–0. The defending NL champion Phils, who haven't allowed a run since the ninth inning of their July 24 contest against the St. Louis Cardinals, will extend their scoreless-innings-pitched streak to an MLB-season-high 421/3 into tomorrow, when it's broken by Chicago in the sixth frame of the opening game of a doubleheader.
  - Clyde Vollmer, who started the month on the Boston Red Sox' bench, continues his slugging fireworks against the Cleveland Indians. Vollmer singles in the tying run in the 15th inning and then in the 16th hits a grand slam off reliever Bob Feller for an 8–4 Red Sox win. The slam is the latest hit in a game in major-league history. Mickey McDermott pitches all 16 innings for the Sox, striking out 15 and walking one.
  - Billy Evans, general manager of the Detroit Tigers since January 1, 1947, announces his resignation, effective October 1. Charlie Gehringer, the Tigers' Hall of Fame former second baseman, will succeed him.

=== August ===
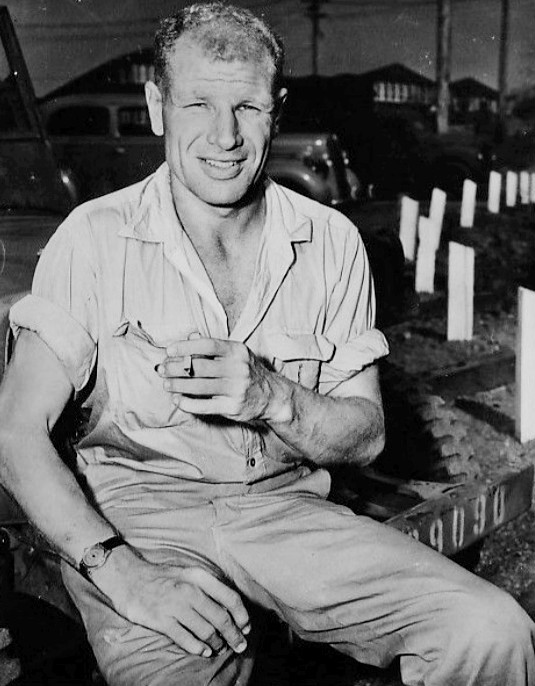
Bill Veeck

- August 1
  - The regular season's penultimate month dawns with the Brooklyn Dodgers (63–32) leading the New York Giants (56–44) by 9½ games (12 in the loss column) in the National League standings. In the American League, the New York Yankees (59–35) lead the second-place Cleveland Indians (58–38) by two lengths and the third-place Boston Red Sox (57–39) by three.
  - Outfielder Bob Cerv makes his major league debut for the Yankees, pinch hitter for shortstop Jerry Coleman in a 9–8 loss to the Detroit Tigers.
- August 7 – Dick Sisler's RBI single in the home half of the 15th gives the Philadelphia Phillies a 1–0 triumph over the Boston Braves. Defending NL champion Philadelphia is 55–51 and, at 13½ games, well out of the 1951 pennant race.
- August 9 – The Brooklyn Dodgers complete a three-game, Ebbets Field series sweep of the second-place New York Giants, 6–5. Roy Campanella bashes two homers, including the game-winner in the seventh inning off Sheldon Jones, and Clyde King picks up his second victory in as many games. The Giants now trail the Dodgers by 121/2 games—15 in the loss column—with 45 games left in the regular season.
- August 11 – Robin Roberts of the Philadelphia Phillies beats the Giants, 4–0, briefly dropping the New Yorkers a season-high 131/2 games behind the first-place Brooklyn Dodgers. However, the Dodgers lose a half-game of their lead when they come up short in the second game of a Saturday doubleheader, 8–4, to the Boston Braves.
- August 12 – The Giants sweep the Phillies in a Polo Grounds Sunday twin bill, 3–2 and 2–1. The victories begin the Giants' 16-game winning streak and a phenomenal 37–7 (.841) stretch run that enables them to tie for the NL pennant on the regular season's final day.
- August 15 – The visiting Cleveland Indians defeat the St. Louis Browns, 9–4, behind Early Wynn for their 13th victory in a row. Cleveland (72–39–1) maintains its 2½-game advantage over the New York Yankees.
- August 18 – The last-place St. Louis Browns set a record for most runs scored by the home side in venerable Sportsman's Park, humbling the visiting Detroit Tigers, 20–9. Hank Arft paces the Brownies with five runs batted in. Detroit pitcher Hank Borowy faces nine hitters: he allows five hits and four walks and does not retire a man. The Browns will be 1951's lowest scoring American League team, and finish 15th of the 16 MLB clubs in that category. When the 57-year-old ball yard closes in May 1966, the Browns' 20 runs will still stand as the most tallied there by any St. Louis-based team—even the powerful Cardinals. But the Browns' feat will be obscured within 24 hours on August 19.
- August 19 – Showman Bill Veeck, the Browns' maverick owner, pulls off one of the greatest stunts in baseball history. In the second game of a doubleheader against the Tigers, Veeck sends Eddie Gaedel to the plate as a pinch-hitter for leadoff man Frank Saucier in the home half of the first. At 3 feet 7 inches (1.09 m) tall, Gaedel becomes the shortest player in baseball annals. Due to his extremely small strike zone, Gaedel walks on four consecutive pitches and is immediately replaced by a pinch-runner. AL president Will Harridge— saying Veeck is making a mockery of the game—voids Gaedel's contract the next day. Detroit goes on to win the game, 6–2.
- August 24 – Just five days after the Gaedel stunt, Veeck stages another headlining promotion, "Grandstand Managers Night," at Sportsman's Park. A select group of 1,000 fans seated in a special section of the ballpark and equipped with YES and NO placards decides game strategy — while the St. Louis Browns' veteran manager, Zack Taylor, sits in a rocking chair, smoking a pipe, in the Brownie dugout. The "grandstand managers" even help Taylor make out his lineup card. The promotion has mixed results: a paltry 3,925 attend the contest, but the 38–81 Browns defeat the 49–75 Philadelphia Athletics, 5–3, with Ned Garver improving to 15–8 on the season.
- August 27 – The New York Giants extend their winning streak to 16 games, sweeping the Chicago Cubs in a Polo Grounds doubleheader, 5–4 (12 innings) and 6–3. The Giants have now shaved the Brooklyn Dodgers' National League lead to five games, six in the loss column.
- August 29
  - With four-plus weeks remaining in the regular season, there is a torrid pennant race in the American League. The Cleveland Indians and New York Yankees have been trading blows all this month; today Cleveland, which held a three-game lead as recently as August 23, falls into a dead heat with the Yankees at 80–47, when they fall to the Philadelphia Athletics, 3–0, and the Yankees overwhelm the St. Louis Browns, 15–2.
  - In an attempt to bolster their pitching staff, the Yankees acquire four-time 20-game winner Johnny Sain from the Boston Braves for rookie right-hander Lew Burdette, who has spent 1951 pitching in Triple-A. The trade helps both clubs: Sain, 33, contributes to three consecutive World Series championships (1951–1953), while Burdette, 24, blossoms into a top hurler who wins 179 games in a Braves' uniform; his three complete-game victories will lift the Milwaukee Braves to the 1957 World Series title over the Yankees themselves.

=== September ===
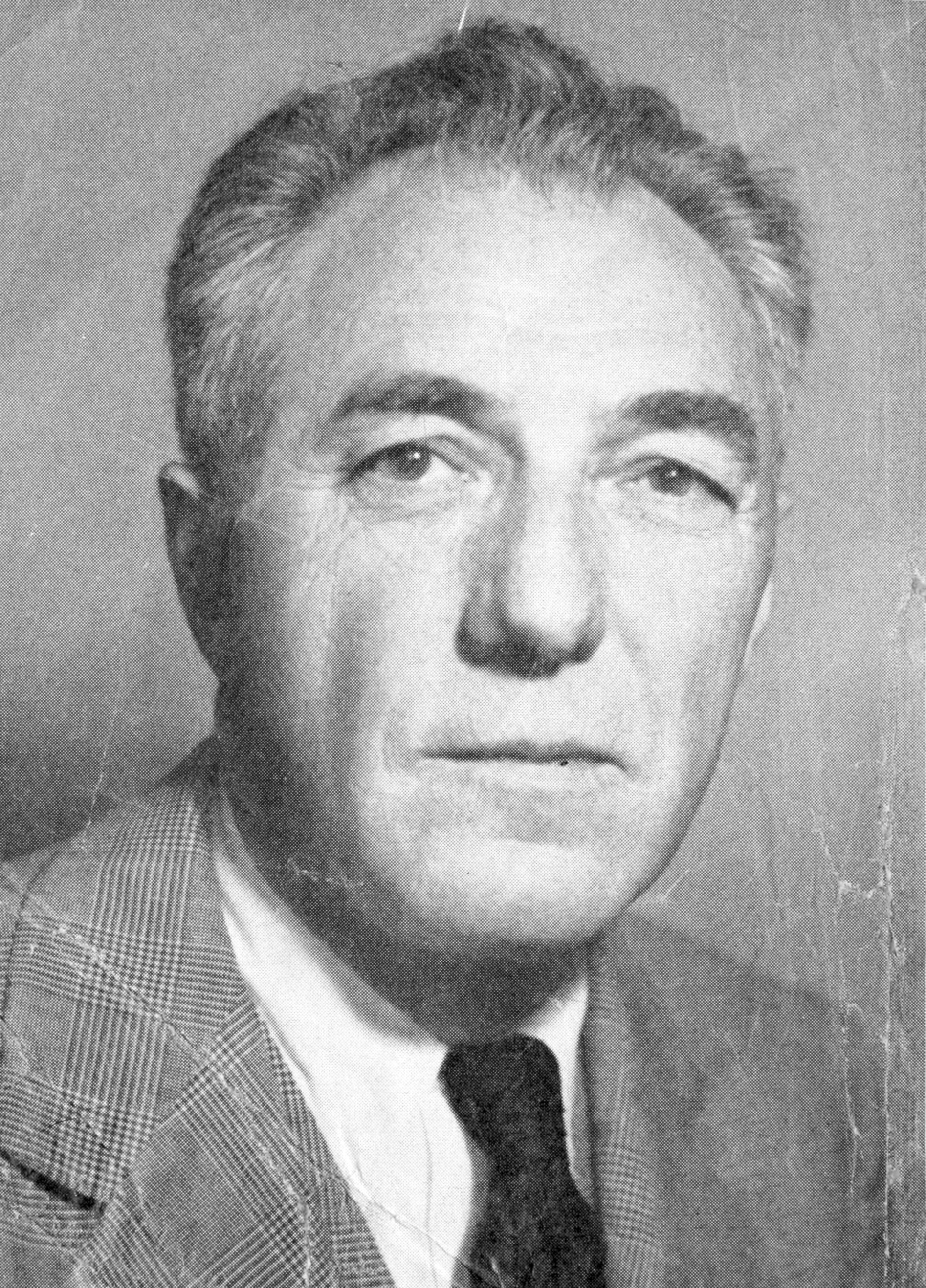
Ford Frick

- September 1 – New York Giants outfielder Don Mueller hits three home runs and drives in five runs in an 8–1 victory over the Brooklyn Dodgers at Polo Grounds. Sal Maglie is the winning pitcher. Dodgers starter Ralph Branca‚ coming off two consecutive shutouts‚ lasts only four innings. The only run for Brooklyn comes on a hit by pitch, when Maglie hits Jackie Robinson with the bases loaded in the third inning. The Giants' Whitey Lockman is plunked twice, by Dodgers relievers Bud Podbielan and Phil Haugstad. In a flashy fielding play, shortstop Alvin Dark and second baseman Eddie Stanky combine in the fifth inning on a triple play off a liner by Dodgers shortstop Pee Wee Reese.
- September 3 – Labor Day doubleheaders see the Dodgers sweep the Boston Braves and the Giants split with the Philadelphia Phillies. Meanwhile, the Cleveland Indians sweep the Chicago White Sox and the New York Yankees split with the Philadelphia Athletics. The standings: in the National League, the Dodgers (84–47) lead the Giants (79–54) by six games; and in the American League, Cleveland (84–49) holds a half-game edge over New York (82–48).
- September 7 – In one of 1951's longest games, the Cincinnati Reds defeat the visiting Chicago Cubs 7–6 in 18 innings. Catcher Dixie Howell's sacrifice fly plates the Reds' winning run.
- September 13 – The St. Louis Cardinals become the first team in modern Major League history to play two different teams on the same day. Due to a rain-out, the Cardinals are forced to play the New York Giants in an afternoon game prior to their scheduled night contest against the Boston Braves.
- September 14 – At Fenway Park, Bob Nieman of the St. Louis Browns becomes the first player in history to hit two home runs in his first two MLB plate appearances. Nieman will be joined by Bert Campaneris (1964), Mark Quinn (1999), J.P. Arencibia (2010) and Trevor Story (2016) in the select group of players who have hit two homers in their debut game.
  - Joshua Báez of the St. Louis Cardinals will shatter their record on August 15, 2026, by slamming home runs in his first three major-league at bats.
- September 17 – A crucial, three-game series between the American League's two top teams in The Bronx concludes, turning the tide of the pennant race. The New York Yankees (now 89–53) defeat the Cleveland Indians, 2–1, when Phil Rizzuto's ninth-inning bunt single scores Joe DiMaggio from third base with the winning run. Eddie Lopat wins his 20th game, defeating Bob Lemon. The Yankees take two out of three from Cleveland (now 90–56) and a one-game lead in the standings. The Indians will go only 3–5 over their final eight games, while the Yankees will finish 9–3, including a humiliating five-game sweep over the visiting, third-place Boston Red Sox to close the season. They will clinch the pennant September 28.
- September 19 – Larry Doby draws five walks in five plate appearances and scores four runs in Cleveland's 15–2 rout of the Red Sox at Fenway Park.
- September 20 – Ford Frick, 56, president of the National League since 1934, is elected the third Commissioner of Baseball and takes office immediately. Cincinnati Reds president/general manager Warren Giles, 55, the runner-up in the balloting, will succeed Frick as the Senior Circuit's chief executive. In Frick, MLB owners choose a baseball insider, unlike the first two Commissioners, a federal judge (Kenesaw Mountain Landis) and a politician (Happy Chandler). Frick and Giles also will swap headquarters, with the Commissioner's office moving from Cincinnati to New York City, and Giles establishing the NL's new offices in Chandler's old suite in Cincinnati's Carew Tower.
- September 25 – Defeating Ralph Branca and Carl Erskine, the fourth-place Boston Braves sweep the Brooklyn Dodgers (93–56) in a Tuesday doubleheader at Braves Field, 6–3 and 14–2. Meanwhile, the New York Giants (93–58) win their single game against the Philadelphia Phillies behind Jim Hearn, 5–1 at Shibe Park. Brooklyn's NL lead shrinks to a single game, two in the loss column.
- September 27 – Gabe Paul, vice president and traveling secretary of the Cincinnati Reds, is promoted to general manager, succeeding long-time mentor Warren Giles, now president of the National League.
- September 28
  - Allie Reynolds turns in the second no-hitter of his career, and his second this season, as the New York Yankees blank the Boston Red Sox, 8–0, in the first game of a doubleheader in The Bronx. Reynolds' no-no clinches a tie for the American League pennant. Then, in Game 2, the Yankees seal their 18th league title with an 11–3 thumping.
  - When the clock strikes midnight on the Friday evening of the 1951 season's final weekend, the National League pennant race is dead even. The Brooklyn Dodgers, only 12–13 so far in September, bow to the host Philadelphia Phillies, 4–3, as Carl Erskine is defeated by the Phillie tandem of starter Karl Drews and reliever Andy Hansen. Willie "Puddin' Head" Jones drives home the winning run in the home half of the ninth inning. The New York Giants, 18–5 so far this month, have an open date. Both teams boast 94–58 records with two games remaining.
- September 29 – The NL race remains a dead heat as both the Dodgers (5–0, behind Don Newcombe) and Giants (3–0, behind Sal Maglie) shut out the Phillies and Boston Braves on the road.
- September 30
  - The New York Giants clinch at least a tie for the 1951 National League pennant by defeating the Boston Braves, 3–2, behind Larry Jansen's 22nd victory of the year. Bobby Thomson jump-starts the Giants' scoring with a second-inning home run.
  - At Shibe Park, the Brooklyn Dodgers overcome an early 6–1 deficit to send their game with the Philadelphia Phillies into extra innings, 8–8. Neither team scores until the top of the 14th when Jackie Robinson—who in the 12th had saved the Dodgers' season with a brilliant, diving catch of Eddie Waitkus' bases-loaded line drive—belts a solo home run off Phillies' ace Robin Roberts, pitching in relief, to give Brooklyn a 9–8 lead. The Dodgers' Bud Podbielan then holds the Phillies off the scoreboard in the bottom of the 14th. The Brooklyn victory sets up the second best-of-three tie-breaker series in the NL's 75-year history.

=== October ===
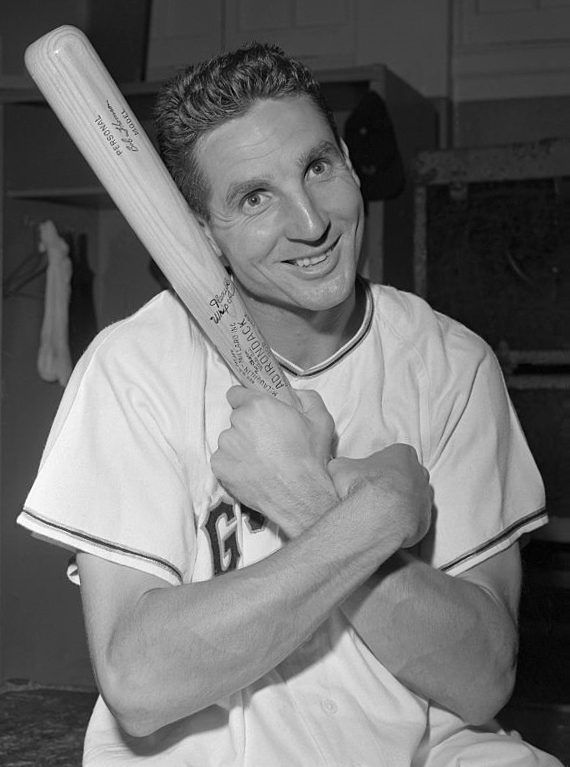
Bobby Thomson in 1951

- October 1–2 – The New York Giants and Brooklyn Dodgers split the first two games of the 1951 National League tie-breaker series. With Jim Hearn tossing a five-hitter and Bobby Thomson bashing a difference-making two-run homer off Ralph Branca, New York takes Game 1 at Ebbets Field, 3–1. The next day, Brooklyn answers with a 10–0 whitewashing behind Clem Labine's six-hit shutout and Jackie Robinson's three hits and three RBI. Game 3 on October 3 will decide the league champion.
- October 3 – The Giants had been 131/2 games behind the National League leading Dodgers in mid-August, but under Leo Durocher's guidance and with the aid of a 16-game winning streak, they complete their improbable comeback. In Game 3 of the NL playoffs at the Polo Grounds, Brooklyn leads 4–2 with one out in the bottom of the ninth inning. With Giants' runners on second and third, New York's Bobby Thomson hits reliever Branca's third pitch for a line-drive home run into the left-field stands to win the game, 5–4. His "shot heard 'round the world" wins the NL pennant in "walk off" style, and WMCA-AM's Russ Hodges' frantic "The Giants win the pennant!", said four times consecutively, becomes one of the most famous home run calls in baseball history.
- October 4 – For the 14 clubs not in the 1951 World Series, the off-season trading period kicks off when the Chicago Cubs deal 24-year-old catcher Smoky Burgess and outfielder Bob Borkowski to the Cincinnati Reds for catcher Johnny Pramesa and outfielder Bob Usher.
- October 8 – In a marriage of opposite personalities, showman owner Bill Veeck names cantankerous former Baseball Hall of Fame second baseman Rogers Hornsby manager of the 1952 St. Louis Browns, replacing Zack Taylor. Upon his appointment, Hornsby promises "no midgets, no gimmicks, just good baseball."
- October 10
  - The New York Yankees defeat the New York Giants, 4–3, in Game 6 of the World Series to win their third consecutive Series championship and 14th overall. The Yanks' Eddie Lopat goes 2–0 (0.50) with two complete games, and Gil McDougald drives in seven runs for the victors, while Monte Irvin (11 hits, .458) and Alvin Dark (ten hits, .417) star in a losing cause. Just before today's game, Giants manager Leo Durocher turns over to newly installed Commissioner Ford Frick a letter that offered the Giants manager a $15,000 bribe "if the Giants managed to lose the next three games".
  - In an all-pitcher, six-player transaction, the independently operated Seattle Rainiers of the Pacific Coast League trade Marv Grissom and Hal Brown to the Chicago White Sox for Jerry Dahlke, Bill Fischer, Marv Rotblatt and minor-leaguer Richard Duffy.
- October 11 – The Boston Braves trade outfielder Bob Addis to the Chicago Cubs for shortstop Jack Cusick.
- October 14 – The Cincinnati Reds trade outfielder Jim Bolger to Buffalo of the Triple-A International League for pitchers Tom Acker and Moe Savransky.
- October 17 – The Yomiuri Giants win the Japan Series over the Nankai Hawks. The Giants went on to win the Central League pennant 19 times in the next 23 years, including nine in succession (1965–73).
- October 22 – The third-place Boston Red Sox, who lost 12 of their last 13 games to finish 87–67 in 1951, replace veteran manager Steve O'Neill with infielder Lou Boudreau, who has just completed his first season in a Red Sox uniform. Boudreau, 34, formerly was the player-manager of the Cleveland Indians from 1942 to 1950, and in his most famous season, 1948, led the Indians to a playoff victory over the Red Sox, and—ultimately—a World Series championship.
- October 24 — The Washington Senators send slick-fielding shortstop Willy Miranda to the Chicago White Sox for veteran infielder Floyd Baker.

=== November ===
- November 1 – Brooklyn Dodgers catcher Roy Campanella is named National League Most Valuable Player, the first of three MVP awards he will receive during his Hall of Fame career. In 1951, Campanella, 29, batted .325, fourth in the NL, with 33 home runs and 108 run batted in in 143 games.
- November 8 – Campanella's opposite number in The Bronx, Yogi Berra, wins the first of his three American League Most Valuable Player Awards. Cooperstown-bound Berra, 26, batted .294 (27 homers, 88 runs batted in) for the AL champion New York Yankees in 1951. In the balloting, he defeats pitcher Ned Garver by 27 points. Right-hander Garver had gone 20–12 with 24 complete games for a St. Louis Browns squad that won only 52 games all season.
- November 10 – In Tokyo, 50,000 fans are on hand as an American All-Star team battles a Japanese Central League All-Star team. Joe DiMaggio hits a 400-foot home run in the eighth inning to tie the game at 1–1, then his younger brother Dom laces an RBI-triple in the ninth and later scores to give the Americans a 3–2 victory. The Americans have won 12 games and tied one.
- November 13 – The Chicago White Sox remain active in the trade market under general manager "Frantic" Frank Lane, dealing pitcher Randy Gumpert and outfielder Don Lenhardt to the Boston Red Sox for left-hander Chuck Stobbs and infielder Mel Hoderlein.
- November 15 – Willie Mays, the brilliant, 20-year-old centerfielder of the New York Giants, and Gil McDougald, 23, versatile infielder of the New York Yankees, win their circuits' respective "Rookie of the Year" awards. For Mays, it is the first major honor in a Hall of Fame career.
- November 23 – The New York Yankees send young catcher Clint Courtney to the St. Louis Browns in exchange for pitcher Jim McDonald. Courtney, a scrapper despite being the first major-league catcher to wear eyeglasses, had appeared in one game for New York. He'll appear in 945 more American League contests through 1961.
- November 24 – The St. Louis Cardinals fire manager Marty Marion after only one season at the team's helm. Eight-time NL All-Star shortstop Marion, 33, led the 1951 Redbirds to an 81–73 mark and third-place finish.
- November 27
  - In an eight-player trade, the St. Louis Browns send catcher Sherm Lollar, pitcher Al Widmar and infielder Tom Upton to the Chicago White Sox in exchange for catcher Gus Niarhos, pitcher Dick Littlefield, first baseman Gordon Goldsberry, shortstop Joe DeMaestri and outfielder Jim Rivera. Rivera, a favorite of Browns' manager Rogers Hornsby, will be traded back to the ChiSox in eight months. Lollar will be Chicago's regular catcher for a decade, and make eight AL All-Star teams.
  - The White Sox also swap shortstops with the Washington Senators, dealing Tom Upton to Washington for Sam Dente.
- November 28 – The Browns trade Niarhos, along with outfielder Ken Wood, to the Boston Red Sox for catcher Les Moss and outfielder Tom Wright. The Browns also sign veteran free-agent shortstop Marty Marion, fired as the St. Louis Cardinals' manager four days earlier, as a player-coach.

=== December ===
- December 5 – The Pittsburgh Pirates reacquire first baseman Dale Long on waivers from the St. Louis Browns. In March, the Pirates and Long had made headlines when he was briefly auditioned as a left-handed-throwing catcher. When that experiment was abandoned, he returned to his original position. Long will spend 1952 through 1954 in the minor leagues before winning the Pirates' first base job in 1955 and setting an MLB record for homers in consecutive games in 1956.
- December 10 – The Cincinnati Reds and Philadelphia Phillies pull off a seven-player trade, with the Reds dealing pitcher Howie Fox, catcher Smoky Burgess and infielder Connie Ryan to the Phils for pitcher Niles Jordan, catcher Andy Seminick, infielder Eddie Pellagrini and outfielder Dick Sisler. Eventually, Burgess and Seminick will again be traded for each other as part of a six-player swap in April 1955.
- December 11
  - Three-time MVP and 13-time All Star center fielder Joe DiMaggio officially retires as a member of the New York Yankees at age 37. In a 13-season career for the club, DiMaggio posted a .325 batting average with 2,214 hits, 361 home runs and 1,537 runs batted in in 1,736 games played. A future Baseball Hall of Famer, his 56-game consecutive-game hitting streak in the 1941 season is the longest in Major League Baseball history and will stand as one of the all-time best diamond achievements.
  - The St. Louis Cardinals and New York Giants conclude weeks of negotiation and rumors, with the Cardinals acquiring pugnacious veteran second baseman Eddie Stanky from the Giants for pitcher Max Lanier and outfielder Chuck Diering. Stanky, 36, immediately signs a two-year contract to succeed Marty Marion as manager of the Redbirds.

== Movies ==
- Rhubarb
- Angels in the Outfield

== Births ==
=== January ===
- January 2:
  - Jim Essian
  - Bill Madlock
  - Royle Stillman
- January 5 – Bob Reece
- January 6:
  - Don Gullett
  - Joe Lovitto
- January 10 – Gary Martz
- January 14 – Derrel Thomas
- January 22 – Leon Roberts
- January 23 – Charlie Spikes
- January 25:
  - Balor Moore
  - Vern Ruhle
- January 27 – Mike Overy
- January 29 – Sergio Ferrer

=== February ===
- February 2 – Leo Foster
- February 3 – Mike Wallace
- February 4 – Stan Papi
- February 7 – Benny Ayala
- February 8 – Steve Dillard
- February 9 – Eddie Solomon
- February 12 – Don Stanhouse
- February 14 – Larry Milbourne
- February 15 – Tommy Cruz
- February 16 – Glenn Abbott
- February 17:
  - Mike Cosgrove
  - Dave Roberts
- February 24 – Frank Ortenzio
- February 25 – César Cedeño
- February 28:
  - Rufino Linares
  - Tom Spencer
  - Jim Wohlford

=== March ===
- March 2 – Mike Johnson
- March 4 – Sam Perlozzo
- March 7 – Jeff Burroughs
- March 20 – Terry McDermott
- March 27 – Dick Ruthven

=== April ===
- April 2 – Tom Johnson
- April 5 – Rennie Stennett
- April 6 – Bert Blyleven
- April 7:
  - Dave Cripe
  - Dave Oliver
- April 11 – Sid Monge
- April 18 – Doug Flynn
- April 21 – Randy Sterling
- April 29 – Rick Burleson

=== May ===
- May 1 – Rudy Meoli
- May 6 – Steve Staggs
- May 8 – Dennis Leonard
- May 9 – Dan Thomas
- May 12 – Joe Nolan
- May 16 – Mike Potter
- May 18:
  - Eric Gregg
  - Jim Sundberg
- May 24 – Dave Machemer

=== June ===
- June 5:
  - Randy Elliott
  - Darryl Jones
- June 9:
  - Billy Baldwin
  - Dave Parker
- June 12 – Dave Skaggs
- June 16 – Stan Wall
- June 22 – Mike Anderson
- June 24:
  - Mike Bruhert
  - Ken Reitz
- June 29:
  - Jimmy Freeman
  - Bruce Kimm

=== July ===
- July 1 – Jim Otten
- July 2 – Keith Marshall
- July 5 – Goose Gossage
- July 8 – Alan Ashby
- July 10 – Bob Bailor
- July 11 – Ed Ott
- July 29:
  - Dan Driessen
  - Ken Kravec
  - Greg Minton
  - Gary Thomasson

=== August ===
- August 1 – Pete Mackanin
- August 4 – Joe McIntosh
- August 5 – Mardie Cornejo
- August 7:
  - Charlie Chant
  - Jim Sadowski
- August 9 – Steve Swisher
- August 11 – Jim Hughes
- August 17 – Butch Hobson
- August 19 – Luis Gómez
- August 21 – John Stearns
- August 22:
  - John Doherty
  - Ike Hampton
- August 27 – Buddy Bell
- August 28 – Joel Youngblood

=== September ===
- September 2 – Dave Criscione
- September 3:
  - Alan Bannister
  - Dave Campbell
- September 8 – Steve Barr
- September 10 – Randy Wiles
- September 13 – Tom McMillan
- September 18 – Tony Scott
- September 19 – Nardi Contreras
- September 27 – Doug Konieczny
- September 28 – Dave Rajsich
- September 29 – John McLaren

=== October ===
- October 1 – Ken Pape
- October 2 – Bob Coluccio
- October 3 – Dave Winfield
- October 4 – Horace Speed
- October 9 – Derek Bryant
- October 13 – Frank LaCorte
- October 15:
  - Mitchell Page
  - Tommy Toms
- October 18:
  - Andy Hassler
  - Rudy Hernández
- October 21 – Ron Pruitt
- October 25:
  - Al Cowens
  - John LaRose
- October 26 – Steve Ontiveros
- October 30 – Tom Poquette
- October 31:
  - Dave Freisleben
  - Dave Trembley

=== November ===
- November 1:
  - Eric Raich
  - Chico Ruiz
- November 3 – Dwight Evans
- November 7 – John Tamargo
- November 10 – Mike Vail
- November 13 – Larry Harlow
- November 15 – Orlando González
- November 16 – Herb Washington
- November 20 – Jackson Todd
- November 23 – Wayne Cage
- November 25 – Bucky Dent
- November 27 – Dan Spillner
- November 29 – Gary Wheelock

=== December ===
- December 2 – Adrian Devine
- December 3 – Lafayette Currence
- December 7 – Paul Dade
- December 12 – Tim McClelland
- December 15 – Jimmy Sexton
- December 16 – Mike Flanagan
- December 18 – Orlando Ramírez
- December 20 – Mike Hart
- December 24 – John D'Acquisto
- December 25 – Luis Quintana
- December 31 – Joe Simpson

== Deaths ==
=== January ===
- January 6 – Harry Camnitz, 66, pitcher who played with the Pittsburgh Pirates in the 1909 season and for the St. Louis Cardinals in 1911.
- January 10 – Tom Delahanty, 78, third baseman for the Philadelphia Phillies, Cleveland Spiders, Pittsburgh Pirates and Louisville Colonels of the National League in a span of three seasons between 1894 and 1897.
- January 11 – Bill Wagner, 57, catcher who played from 1914 through 1918 for the Pittsburgh Pirates and Boston Braves.
- January 13 – Charlie Miller,73, pinch hitter who appeared in just one game for the 1915 Baltimore Terrapins of the Federal League.
- January 16 – Pid Purdy, 46, two-sport athlete who played outfield in four Major League seasons with the Chicago White Sox and Cincinnati Reds from 1927 to 1929, and was a quarterback in the National Football League for the Green Bay Packers in 1926 and 1927.
- January 26 – Bill Barrett, 50, outfielder who played for the Philadelphia Athletics, Chicago White Sox, Boston Red Sox and Washington Senators over nine seasons between 1921 and 1930.

=== February ===
- February 2 – Bill Sowders, 86, pitcher who played from 1888 through 1890 for the Boston Beaneaters and Pittsburgh Alleghenys clubs of the National League.
- February 6 – Gabby Street, 68, who came into prominence as the personal catcher for the legendary pitcher Walter Johnson with the Washington Senators, and as the first man to catch a baseball dropped from the top of Washington Monument; one of the few Major League managers to capture a World Series title in his first attempt, with the St. Louis Cardinals in 1930; managed Cardinals from 1930 to July 23, 1933, and St. Louis Browns for 146 games in 1938; late in his career, popular member of radio broadcast team for both St. Louis teams.
- February 8 – Harry Ables, 67, pitcher who played for the St. Louis Browns, Cleveland Naps and New York Highlanders in part of three seasons spanning 1905–1911.
- February 14 – Harry Thompson, 61, pitcher who split his only big-league season between the Washington Senators and the Philadelphia Athletics in 1919.
- February 20:
  - Steamboat Johnson, 70, National League umpire who ejected 12 men in the 66 games he worked between April 26 and October 5, 1914.
  - Marty Shay, 54, infielder who played with the Chicago Cubs in the 1916 season and for the Boston Braves in 1924.
- February 25 – Smokey Joe Williams, 64, Hall of Fame pitcher and one of the most feared Negro league hurlers in the first half of the 20th century, who would shine for more than two decades for a number of teams, including the Chicago American Giants, New York Lincoln Giants and Homestead Grays, as well as for defeating Hall of Fame pitchers as Grover Alexander, Waite Hoyt, Walter Johnson and Rube Marquard in exhibition competition during his stellar career.

=== March ===
- March 2 – Adam Comorosky, 45, left fielder for the Pittsburgh Pirates and the Cincinnati Reds in a ten-year career from 1926 to 1935, who in 1931 became the only outfielder in National League history to ever perform two unassisted double plays in a single season, joining American League outfielders Tris Speaker (twice), José Cardenal and Socks Seybold.
- March 3 – Dan Bickham, 86, pitcher who played in 1886 for the Cincinnati Red Stockings of the National League.
- March 13 – Joe Hughes, 71, backup outfielder for the 1902 Chicago Orphans of the National League.
- March 20 – Roscoe Coughlin, 83, pitcher who played from 1890 to 1891 for the Chicago Colts and New York Giants.
- March 25:
  - Eddie Collins, 63, Hall of Fame second baseman who played from 1906 through 1930 for the Philadelphia Athletics and Chicago White Sox; won the American League MVP Award in 1914, and is the only AL player to steal six bases in a single game, a feat he accomplished twice in September 1912; led the Athletics to four AL pennants and three World Series championships between 1910 and 1914, as well as the White Sox to the 1917 World Series title; ended his career with a .333 average, .424 on-base percentage, 3,314 hits, and 745 stolen bases in 2,826 games; managed White Sox from May 19 through June 18, 1924, and for all of 1925 and 1926, compiling a 174–160 record and a .521 winning percentage; after returning to the Athletics in 1927, became a coach from 1929 to 1932, serving on two more world champion clubs (1929, 1930); after 1932, moved to Boston Red Sox front office as general manager, working with owner Tom Yawkey to rebuild the club and winning 1946 AL pennant before retiring due to ill health after the 1947 season.
  - Dan Daub, 83, pitcher who played in 1892 with the Cincinnati Reds and for the Brooklyn Grooms and Bridegrooms clubs from 1893 through 1897.
- March 28:
  - Kohly Miller, 77, backup infielder who played for the Washington Senators, St. Louis Browns and Philadelphia Phillies in a span of two seasons between 1892 and 1897.
  - Joe Murphy, 84, pitcher who played from 1886 to 1887 for the Cincinnati Red Stockings, St. Louis Maroons and St. Louis Browns.

=== April ===
- April 5 – Roy Moore, 52, pitcher who played from 1920 to 1923 with the Philadelphia Athletics and Detroit Tigers.
- April 8 – Whitey Guese, 79, pitcher for the 1901 Cincinnati Reds.
- April 13 – Wish Egan, 69, pitcher for the Detroit Tigers and St. Louis Cardinals in part of three seasons from 1902 to 1906, who later became a successful scout in the Tigers system over 40 years, whose discoveries included future Hall of Famers Hal Newhouser and Jim Bunning, and All-Stars like Dizzy Trout, Roy Cullenbine, Hoot Evers, Dick Wakefield, Johnny Lipon, Stubby Overmire, Art Houtteman and Barney McCosky, among others.
- April 14 – Danny Moeller, 66, outfielder for the Pittsburgh Pirates, Washington Senators and Cleveland Indians during seven seasons between 1907 and 1916, who is listed as the first big leaguer of the dead-ball era (before 1950) to have at least five home runs and 100-plus strikeouts in consecutive seasons (1912–1913).
- April 20 – Roy Brashear, 77, backup infielder for the St. Louis Cardinals and Philadelphia Phillies in part of two seasons from 1902 to 1903, who later umpired in the Pacific Coast League for several years.
- April 22 – Ox Eckhardt, 49, right fielder who played with the Boston Braves in the 1932 season and for the Brooklyn Dodgers in 1936.
- April 27 – Bill Eagle, 73, outfielder who played in 1898 for the Washington Senators of the National League.

=== May ===
- May 4 – Charlie Buelow, 74, third baseman for the New York Giants in its 1901 season.
- May 7 – Ezra Lincoln, 82, who pitched for the Cleveland Spiders and Syracuse Stars during the 1890 season.
- May 20 – Frank Olin, 91, outfielder for the Washington Nationals and Toledo Blue Stockings of the American Association in 1884, and the Detroit Wolverines of the National League in 1885, who after graduating from Cornell University founded the Olin Corporation in 1892, formed the Western Cartridge Company in 1898, and acquired the Winchester Repeating Arms Company in 1931, besides being a remarkable philanthropist.
- May 26 – George Winter, 73, pitcher who won 82 games for the Boston Americans and Red Sox from 1901 to 1908, as well as the only member both of the original 1901 and 1908 Boston clubs.

=== June ===
- June 11 – Tom Leahy, 82, backup catcher who played with five different teams in a span of five seasons from 1897 to 1905, mostly for the Washington Senators of the National League between 1897 and 1898.
- June 17 – Bill Harper, 62, pitcher who appeared in two games for the St. Louis Browns of the American League in its 1911 season.
- June 19 – Wally Gerber, 59, a slick shortstop with good hands and a strong throwing arm, who played for the Pittsburgh Pirates, St. Louis Browns and Boston Red Sox over 15 seasons between 1914 and 1929, while setting a Major League record for shortstops with 48 fielding chances in four consecutive games during the 1923 season, and leading the American League in double plays in 1920 and from 1926 to 1927.

=== July ===
- July 3 – Hugh Casey, 37, relief pitching ace for the Brooklyn Dodgers in the 1940s, whose best season came in 1947 when he won 10 games and led the National League with 18 saves, establishing later a World Series record while facing the New York Yankees in six of the seven games of the Series, five consecutively, being credited with a 2–0 record, one save and only one run in 10 1/3 innings of work.
- July 6 – Ted Easterly, 66, catcher for the Cleveland Naps, Chicago White Sox and Kansas City Packers in a span of six seasons from 1909 to 1915, who posted a batting average over .300 over three consecutive seasons with a career-high .324 in 1911, ranking twice among the top ten hitters in the American League and once in the Federal League.
- July 9:
  - Harry Heilmann, 56, Hall of Fame outfielder and Detroit Tigers star, who won four batting titles in the American League between 1921 and 1927, compiling averages of .394, .403, .393 and .398, whose career .342 batting average ranks him 12th in the all-time list; later, a sportscaster and radio play-by-play announcer for the Tigers from 1934 until his death.
  - Huck Wallace, 68, pitcher for the 1912 Philadelphia Phillies.
- July 10 – Bobby Messenger, 67, outfielder who played with the Chicago White Sox and St. Louis Browns in part of four seasons between 1909 and 1914.
- July 14:
  - Dee Cousineau, 52, catcher who played in five total games for the Boston Braves in three seasons from 1923 to 1925.
  - Vance Page, 45, pitcher who spent four seasons with the Chicago Cubs from 1938 through 1941.
- July 18 – Joe Klugmann, 56, second baseman who played for the Chicago Cubs, Brooklyn Robins and Cleveland Indians in part of four seasons between 1921 and 1925.
- July 19 – Sam Agnew, 64, solid catcher for the St. Louis Browns, Boston Red Sox and Washington Senators in span of seven seasons from 1913 to 1918, who was also a member of the 1918 World Series Champion Red Sox.
- July 24 – Ed Fisher, 74, pitcher who appeared in one game for the Detroit Tigers near the end of the 1902 season.

=== August ===
- August 1 – Harry Curtis, 68, catcher for the 1907 New York Giants.
- August 2 – Guy Cooper, 68, pitcher who played from 1914 to 1915 for the New York Yankees and Boston Red Sox.
- August 4 – Tony Tonneman, 69, catcher who played briefly for the 1911 Boston Red Sox.
- August 7:
  - Bill Wynne, 82, who pitched in 1894 with the Washington Senators of the National League.
  - Biff Wysong, 46, pitcher who played from 1930 through 1932 for the Cincinnati Reds.
- August 10 – Win Kellum, 75, Canadian pitcher for the Boston Americans, Cincinnati Reds and St. Louis Cardinals during three seasons 1901 and 1905, who in 1901 became the first Opening Day starting pitcher in Boston American League franchise's history.
- August 12 – Paul McSweeney, 84, backup infielder who appeared in three games for the 1891 St. Louis Browns of the National League.
- August 17:
  - Doc Crandall, 63, pitcher who played with six teams in three different leagues between 1908 and 1918, most prominently for the New York Giants from 1908 to 1913, playing for them in three consecutive World Series from 1911 to 1913 and known also for his hitting, as he was often used as a pinch-hitter by Giants manager John McGraw.
  - Ren Wylie, 89, center fielder who appeared in just one game for the 1882 Pittsburgh Alleghenys.
- August 19 – Ollie Hanson, 55, pitcher who played for the Chicago Cubs in its 1921 season.
- August 28:
  - Billy Lush, 77, very solid center fielder who spent seven seasons in the majors with four teams from 1895 to 1904, enjoying his most productive seasons in 1903 and 1904 with the Detroit Tigers and Cleveland Naps, respectively.
  - Bill Piercy, 55, pitcher who played for the New York Yankees, Boston Red Sox and Chicago Cubs during six seasons between 1917 and 1926, including the Yankees team that won the 1921 American League pennant.

=== September ===
- September 4 – Carl Doyle, 39, pitcher who spent four seasons between 1935 and 1940 with the Philadelphia Athletics, Brooklyn Dodgers and St. Louis Cardinals.
- September 5 – Jim Keesey, 48, first baseman who played with the Philadelphia Athletics in part of two seasons spanning 1925–1930.
- September 9 – Chappie Snodgrass, 81, backup outfielder for the 1901 Baltimore Orioles.
- September 10 – Hank DeBerry, 56, catcher who played for the Cleveland Indians and Brooklyn Robins in a span of eleven seasons from 1916 to 1930.
- September 12 – Lave Winham, 69, who pitched from 1902 to 1903 for the Brooklyn Superbas and Pittsburgh Pirates.
- September 14 – Wally Roettger, 49, outfielder for the St. Louis Cardinals, Cincinnati Reds, New York Giants and Pittsburgh Pirates from 1927 through 1935, who got the first hit and scored the first run in Game 1 of the 1931 World Series for the eventual champion Cardinals; head baseball coach of the University of Illinois from 1935 until his death.
- September 16 – Bill Klem, 77, Hall of Fame umpire known as the Old Arbitrator and the Father of Baseball Umpires, who officiated National League games during a 37-year career from 1905 to 1941 and introduced the inside chest protector, while working in 18 World Series to set a Major League Baseball record for umpires.
- September 23 – Dale Gear, 79, who pitched with the Cleveland Spiders in the 1896 season and for the Washington Senators in 1901.
- September 25 – Nolen Richardson, 48, third baseman for the Detroit Tigers, New York Yankees and Cincinnati Reds during six seasons between 1929 and 1939, who also was the shortstop and captain of the 1937 Newark Bears, which is widely regarded as the best in Minor League Baseball history.

=== October ===
- October 11 – Bob Becker, 76, pitcher for the Philadelphia Phillies in the 1897 and 1898 seasons.
- October 12:
  - Bill Essick, 70, pitcher for the Cincinnati Reds from 1906 to 1907 and later a longtime Minor League manager and New York Yankees scout, who is credited for discovering or signing future Yankees stars Joe DiMaggio, Lefty Gomez, Joe Gordon and Ralph Houk, among others.
  - Pug Griffin, 55, utility outfielder for the Philadelphia Athletics in 1917 and the New York Giants in 1920, who later became a successful manager in the Minor Leagues, guiding the Lincoln Links to the 1943 Nebraska State League title, and the Pueblo Rollers to the Western League championship in 1941.
  - Rube Vinson, 72, outfielder who played from 1904 through 1906 for the Cleveland Naps and Chicago White Sox.
- October 14 – Henry Zeiher, 89, catcher for the 1886 Washington Nationals of the National League.
- October 17 – Al Clancy, 63, third baseman who appeared in three games for the St. Louis Browns in its 1911 season.
- October 19 – Emil Haberer, 73, catcher and corner infielder who played for the Cincinnati Reds in a span of three seasons from 1901 to 1909.
- October 27:
  - Pryor McElveen, 69, third baseman who played for the Brooklyn Superbas and Dodgers teams between 1909 and 1911.
  - John Brock, 55, backup catcher for the St. Louis Cardinals in the 1917 and 1918 seasons.
- October 30 – Walt Woods, 76, valuable utility man who played all positions except catcher and first base, whose career included stints with the Chicago Orphans, Louisville Colonels and Pittsburgh Pirates during three seasons from 1898 to 1900.

=== November ===
- November 1 – Mickey Doolin, 71, slick fielding shortstop who played for the Philadelphia Phillies, Chicago Whales, Chicago Cubs, New York Giants and Brooklyn Robins in a span of 13 seasons between 1905 and 1918, while leading the National League in putouts four times, assists five times, double plays five times, and fielding percentage once.
- November 3 – Joe Hovlik, 67, Hungarian pitcher who played from 1909 to 1911 for the Chicago White Sox and Washington Senators.
- November 5 – George Stovall, 73, who played and managed from 1904 through 1913 for the Cleveland Naps and St. Louis Browns of the American League, and for the Kansas City Packers of the outlaw Federal League in 1914 and 1915.
- November 6 – Carl Husta, 49, shortstop who appeared in six games with the 1925 Philadelphia Athletics.
- November 8 – Claude Ritchey, 78, middle infielder and outfielder over 13 seasons for the Cincinnati Reds, Pittsburgh Pirates, Boston Doves and Louisville Colonels, who helped the Pirates win three consecutive National League pennants from 1901 to 1903.
- November 11 – Jim Neher, 62, pitcher who appeared in just one game for the Cleveland Naps in their 1912 season.
- November 18 – Wally Mayer, 61, catcher who played from 1911 through 1919 for the Chicago White Sox, Boston Red Sox and St. Louis Browns.
- November 19:
  - Marty Griffin, 50, pitcher for the 1928 Boston Red Sox.
  - Crese Heismann, 71, pitcher who played from 1901 to 1902 with the Cincinnati Reds and Baltimore Orioles.
  - Pete Hill, 69, Hall of Fame outfielder whose career from 1889 to the mid-1920s involved some of the pioneer programs of the Negro leagues, being considered to be a great center fielder with a strong arm and excellent glove, while his talents also extended as a consistent line-drive hitter, both for average and power, with outstanding speed on the base paths, closing his career by serving as the player-manager for several teams between 1914 and 1925.
- November 20:
  - Fred Burchell, 72, who pitched with the Philadelphia Phillies during the 1903 season and for the Boston Americans and Red Sox from 1907 to 1909.
  - Joe Rogalski, 39, pitcher who played in 1938 with the Detroit Tigers.

=== December ===
- December 5:
  - Jim Duggan, 66, first baseman who played for the St. Louis Browns in its 1911 season.
  - Shoeless Joe Jackson, 63, left fielder and prominent hitter whose career lasted from 1908 to 1920 with the Philadelphia Athletics, Cleveland Naps and Chicago White Sox, who hit .408 in 1908, the highest batting average ever by a rookie, while hitting a slash line of .408/.468/.590 in 1911 during his first season as a full-time player, and leading the White Sox to the 1917 World Series victory against the New York Giants, ending his career with a .356 average for the third highest in Major League history, before being banished from the sport for his involvement in the Black Sox scandal.
- December 8 – Bobby Lowe, 86, second baseman who joined the Boston Beaneaters in 1890 and remained with them through 1901, winning five National League pennants in that period while completing an outstanding infield that featured Fred Tenney at first, Herman Long at shortstop and Jimmy Collins at third, whose claim to fame came when he became the first player in Major League history to hit four home runs in a single game, which was played on the afternoon of Memorial Day, 1894, against the Cincinnati Reds at Congress Street Grounds.
- December 18:
  - Spencer Abbott, 74, coach for 1935 Washington Senators and longtime minor league player and manager, whose baseball career lasted for 52 years.
  - Joe Ohl, 63, pitcher for the 1909 Senators.
- December 19 – Bob Lindemann, 70, backup outfielder who played for the Philadelphia Athletics in 1901.
- December 27 – Ernie Lindemann, 73, pitcher who appeared in one game for the Boston Doves in 1907.
- December 29 – Hiram Bithorn, 35, pitcher who was the first player born in Puerto Rico to play in the Major Leagues when he made his debut with the Chicago Cubs in its 1942 season, leading the National League pitchers with seven shutouts in 1943, while posting a record of 34–31 and 3.16 ERA in 105 games over four seasons.
- December 30 – Bob Kinsella, 52, outfielder who spent two seasons with the New York Giants from 1919 to 1920.
