= Hallinan =

Hallinan is a surname. Notable people with the surname include:

- Ed Hallinan (1888–1940), American baseball player
- Jimmy Hallinan (1849–1879), Irish baseball player
- Joseph Hallinan, American journalist and author
- Olivia Hallinan (born 1984), English actress
- Paul John Hallinan (1911–1968), American Catholic prelate
- Renae Hallinan (born 1986), Australian netball player
- Terence Hallinan (1936–2020), American attorney and politician from California
- Timothy Hallinan (born 1949), American thriller writer
- Vincent Hallinan (1896–1992), American lawyer and presidential candidate
