= List of Major League Baseball career games played leaders =

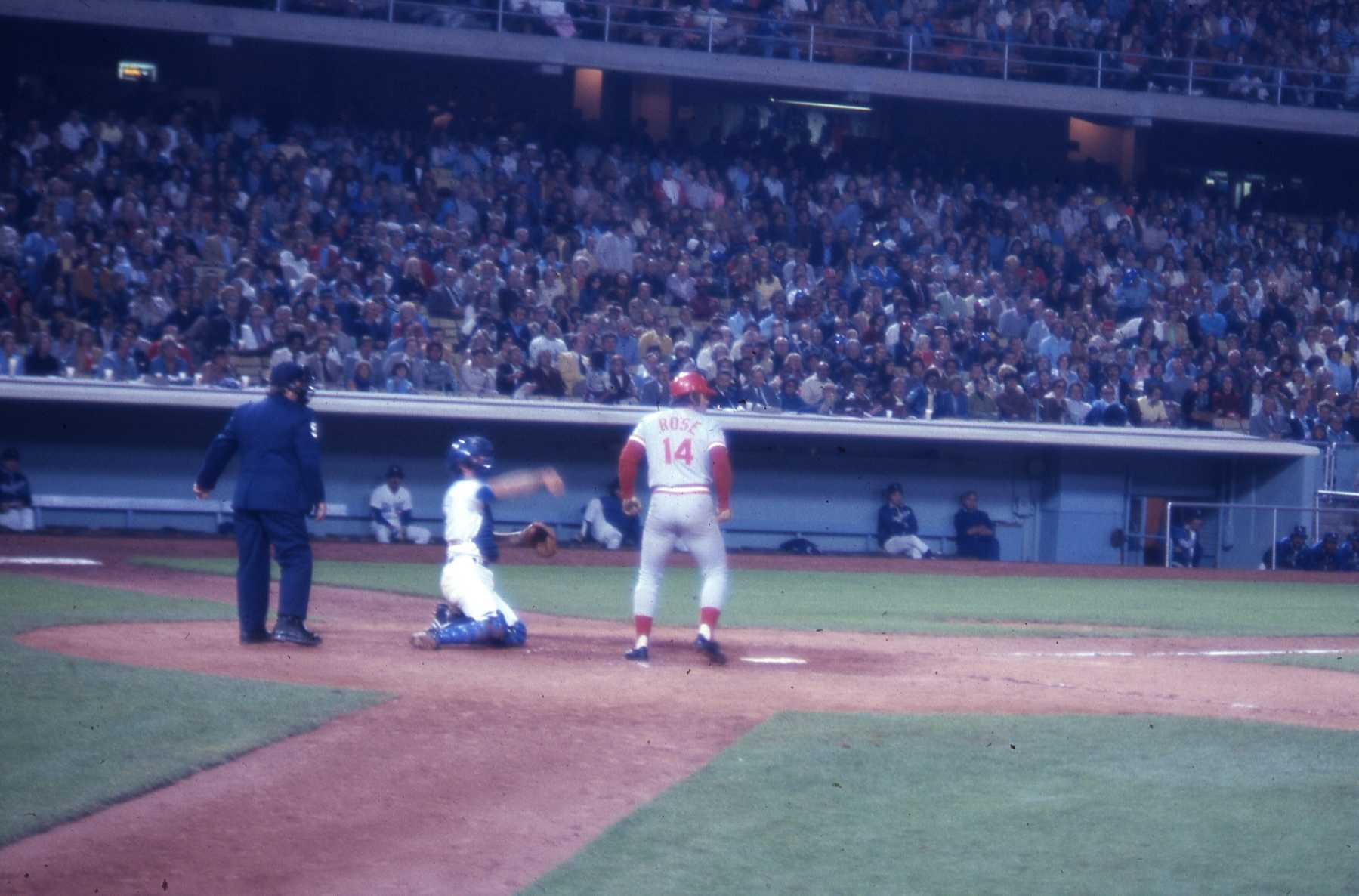
Pete Rose, the all-time leader in games played.

Games played (most often abbreviated as G or GP) is a statistic used in team sports to indicate the total number of games in which a player has participated (in any capacity). In Major League Baseball, this statistic applies to players who appear at any point in a game, either as a starter or as a replacement.

Ty Cobb was the first player to reach 3,000 games played. Cobb's record of 3,035 games played lasted for 46 seasons until Hank Aaron would break the record. Aaron's record was subsequently broken by Carl Yastrzemski in 1983 and finally broken the following season by Pete Rose, who currently holds the record for most games played at 3,562. Rickey Henderson, Eddie Murray, Stan Musial, Albert Pujols, Willie Mays, and Cal Ripken Jr. are the only other players to play in over 3,000 career games. Most of the players that played over 2,000 games were known for their productive hit qualities (all members of the 3,000-hit club are in the top 100 whereas not all hitters with 500 home runs are there); Ron Fairly is the only player in the top 100 of games played to have less than 2,000 hits, having collected 1,913 hits in 2,442 games played.

As of September 27, 2026, no active players are in the top 100 for career games played. The active leader is Freddie Freeman, tied for 105th all-time with 2,332 career games.

== Key ==
**Rank**	Rank amongst leaders in career games played. A blank field indicates a tie.
**Player (2026 Gs)**	Number of games played during the 2026 Major League Baseball season.
**G**	Total career games played.
*	Denotes elected to National Baseball Hall of Fame.
**Bold**	Denotes active player. (Note: A player is considered inactive if he has announced his retirement or has not played for a full season.)

== List ==
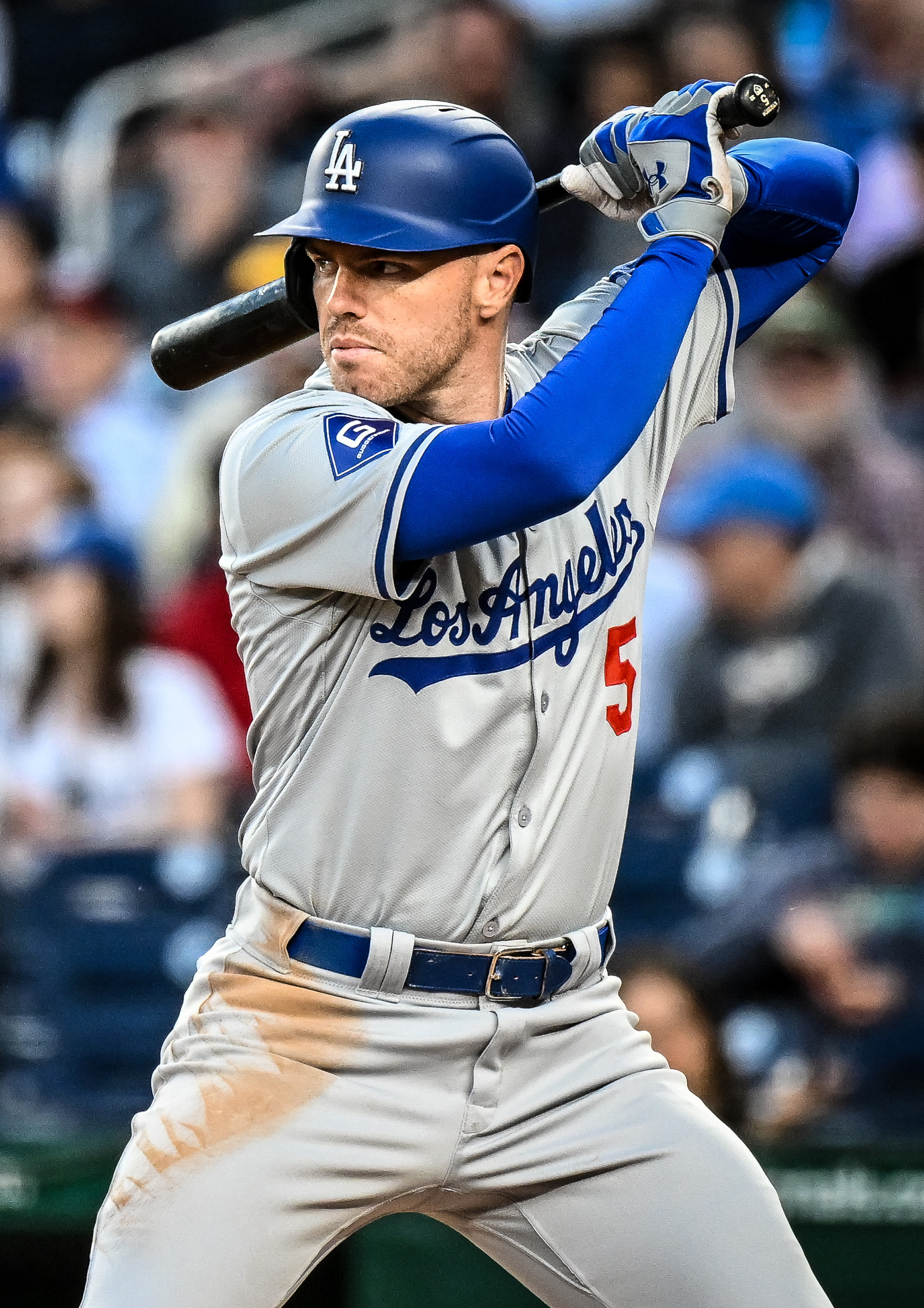
Freddie Freeman, the active leader and tied for 105th all-time in career games played.

- Stats updated as of September 27, 2026.

Rank	Player (2026 Gs)	G
1	Pete Rose	3,562
2	Carl Yastrzemski*	3,308
3	Hank Aaron*	3,298
4	Rickey Henderson*	3,081
5	Albert Pujols	3,080
6	Ty Cobb *	3,035
7	Eddie Murray*	3,026
	Stan Musial*	3,026
9	Willie Mays*	3,005
10	Cal Ripken Jr.*	3,001
11	Barry Bonds	2,986
12	Dave Winfield*	2,973
13	Omar Vizquel	2,968
14	Rusty Staub	2,951
15	Adrián Beltré*	2,933
16	Brooks Robinson*	2,896
17	Robin Yount*	2,856
18	Craig Biggio*	2,850
19	Al Kaline*	2,834
20	Rafael Palmeiro	2,831
21	Harold Baines*	2,830
22	Eddie Collins*	2,826
23	Reggie Jackson*	2,820
24	Frank Robinson*	2,808
25	Miguel Cabrera	2,797
26	Honus Wagner*	2,794
27	Tris Speaker*	2,789
28	Alex Rodriguez	2,784
29	Tony Pérez*	2,777
30	Derek Jeter*	2,747
31	Mel Ott*	2,730
32	George Brett*	2,707
33	Graig Nettles	2,700
34	Darrell Evans	2,687
35	Paul Molitor*	2,683
36	Ken Griffey Jr.*	2,671
37	Rabbit Maranville*	2,670
38	Ichiro Suzuki*	2,653
39	Joe Morgan*	2,649
40	Andre Dawson*	2,627
41	Lou Brock*	2,616
42	Dwight Evans	2,606
43	Luis Aparicio*	2,599
44	Luis Gonzalez	2,591
45	Willie McCovey*	2,588
46	Carlos Beltrán*	2,586
47	Steve Finley	2,583
48	Gary Sheffield	2,576
49	Ozzie Smith*	2,573
50	Paul Waner*	2,549

Rank	Player (2026 Gs)	G
51	Iván Rodríguez*	2,543
	Jim Thome*	2,543
53	Ernie Banks*	2,528
54	Julio Franco	2,527
55	Cap Anson*	2,524
56	Bill Buckner	2,517
	Sam Crawford*	2,517
58	Gary Gaetti	2,507
59	Babe Ruth*	2,503
60	Tim Raines*	2,502
61	Carlton Fisk*	2,499
	Chipper Jones*	2,499
63	Johnny Damon	2,490
64	Dave Concepción	2,488
	Billy Williams*	2,488
66	Nap Lajoie*	2,480
67	Max Carey*	2,476
68	Rod Carew*	2,469
	Vada Pinson	2,469
70	Dave Parker*	2,466
71	Fred McGriff*	2,460
72	Ted Simmons*	2,456
73	Bill Dahlen	2,443
74	Ron Fairly	2,442
75	Tony Gwynn*	2,440
76	Wade Boggs*	2,439
77	Chili Davis	2,436
78	Harmon Killebrew*	2,435
79	Roberto Clemente*	2,433
80	Willie Davis	2,429
81	Bobby Abreu	2,425
82	Luke Appling*	2,422
83	Zack Wheat*	2,410
84	Mickey Vernon	2,409
85	David Ortiz*	2,408
86	Buddy Bell	2,405
87	Sam Rice*	2,404
	Mike Schmidt*	2,404
89	Mickey Mantle*	2,401
90	Jake Beckley*	2,392
91	Eddie Mathews*	2,391
92	Lou Whitaker	2,390
93	Bobby Wallace*	2,383
94	Enos Slaughter*	2,380
95	Roberto Alomar*	2,379
96	Torii Hunter	2,372
97	George Davis*	2,368
	Al Oliver	2,368
99	Nellie Fox*	2,367
100	Willie Stargell*	2,360

== Bibliography ==
- MLB official list
- "Career Leaders & Records for Games Played". Baseball-Reference.com.
