= Bobby Wallace (baseball) =

American baseball player and manager (1873–1960)

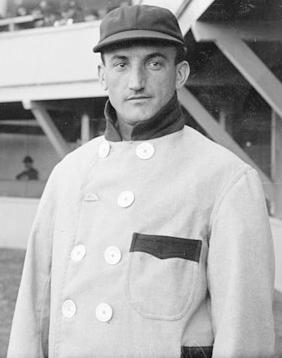
- Wallace with the St. Louis Browns in 1903
- Shortstop / Pitcher / Manager
- Born: November 4, 1873; Pittsburgh, Pennsylvania, U.S.
- Died: November 3, 1960 (aged 86); Torrance, California, U.S.
- Batted: Right Threw: Right

MLB debut
- September 15, 1894, for the Cleveland Spiders

Last MLB appearance
- September 2, 1918, for the St. Louis Cardinals

MLB statistics
- Batting average: .268
- Hits: 2,309
- Home runs: 34
- Runs batted in: 1,121
- Managerial record: 62–154
- Winning %: .287
- Stats at Baseball Reference

Teams
- As player: Cleveland Spiders (1894–1898); St. Louis Perfectos / Cardinals (1899–1901); St. Louis Browns (1902–1916); St. Louis Cardinals (1917–1918); As manager: St. Louis Browns (1911–1912); Cincinnati Reds (1937)

Member of the National

Baseball Hall of Fame
- Induction: 1953
- Election method: Veterans Committee

Roderick John "Bobby" Wallace (November 4, 1873 – November 3, 1960) was an American Major League Baseball infielder, pitcher, manager, umpire, and scout. Wallace claimed to have invented the continuous throwing motion as a shortstop.

== Career ==
Wallace was born in Pittsburgh, Pennsylvania. He made his major league debut in 1894 as a starting pitcher with the Cleveland Spiders. After a 12–14 record in 1895, Wallace played outfield and pitcher in 1896. In 1897, Wallace was an everyday player as he became the team's full-time third baseman, batted .335 and drove in 112 runs.

In 1899, Wallace moved to the St. Louis Perfectos (renamed the Cardinals in 1900) and changed position to shortstop. He hit .295 with 108 RBI and 12 home runs (second in the league behind Buck Freeman's 25). Wallace changed teams again in 1902, when he joined the St. Louis Browns.

His playing time began decreasing a decade later, with his last season as a regular coming in 1912. Wallace played in just 55 games in 1913, and never played that much again for the rest of his career. In July 1917, he returned to the National League and the Cardinals, and played in just eight games that season. After batting .153 in 32 games in 1918, Wallace retired with a .268 career batting average, 1059 runs, 34 home runs, 1121 RBI and 201 stolen bases. He played his last game on September 2, 1918, at the age of 44 years and 312 days, making him the oldest shortstop to play in a regular-season game. The record was broken by Omar Vizquel on May 7, 2012.

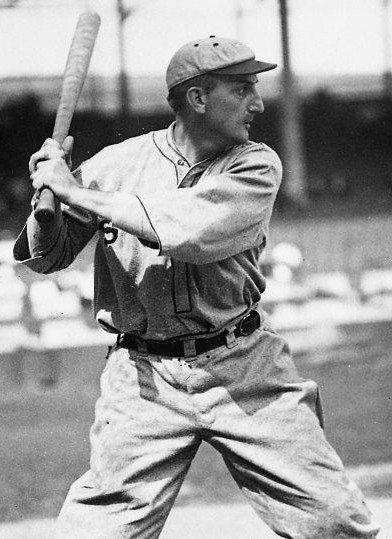
Wallace batting in 1905.

Wallace was generally recognized as the AL's best shortstop from 1902 to 1911, when he served briefly as Browns player-manager. After moving from third to short, Wallace felt he'd found his place in the infield earning the nickname "Mr. Shortstop". He would also claim to have invented the continuous throwing motion, “As more speed afoot was constantly demanded for big league ball, I noticed the many infield bounders which the runner beat to first only by the thinnest fractions of a second.. I also noted that the old-time three-phase movement, fielding a ball, coming erect for a toss and throwing to first wouldn't do on certain hits with fast men...it was plain that the stop and toss had to be combined into a continuous movement.”

He played for 25 seasons, and holds the record for the longest career by a player who never played in a World Series.

When his playing time diminished, Wallace managed and umpired. He managed the St. Louis Browns in 1911 and 1912 and the Cincinnati Reds during part of the 1937 season. He compiled 62 wins and 154 losses for a .287 winning percentage as a major league manager. He also managed the minor league Wichita Witches in 1917. He umpired in the American League in 1915, working 111 games. Upon retiring, he also became a scout.

== Later life ==
Wallace was inducted into the Baseball Hall of Fame in 1953.

Wallace died on November 3, 1960, in Torrance, California, one day shy of his 87th birthday.

== Managerial record ==
Team	Year	Regular season					Postseason			
Team	Year	Games	Won	Lost	Win %	Finish	Won	Lost	Win %	Result
SLB	1911	154	47	107	.305	8th in AL	–	–	–	–
SLB	1912	37	10	27	.270	Fired	–	–	–	–
SLB total		191	57	134	.298		0	0	–	
CIN	1937	25	5	20	.200	8th in NL	–	–	–	–
CIN total		25	5	20	.200		0	0	–	
Total		216	62	154	.287		0	0	–	

== See also ==
- List of Major League Baseball career hits leaders
- List of Major League Baseball career triples leaders
- List of Major League Baseball career runs scored leaders
- List of Major League Baseball career runs batted in leaders
- List of Major League Baseball career stolen bases leaders
- List of Major League Baseball career games played leaders
- List of Major League Baseball player-managers
