= Alton Blues =

- 1917; Alton, Illinois

Minor league affiliations
- Class: Class B (1917)
- League: Three-I League (1917)

Major league affiliations
- Team: None

Minor league titles
- League titles (0): None

Team data
- Name: Alton Blues (1917)
- Ballpark: Sportsman's Park (1917)

The Alton Blues were a minor league baseball team based in Alton, Illinois. In 1917, the Blues played as members of the Class B level Illinois-Indiana-Iowa League, hosting home games at Sportsman's Park. The league folded during the 1917 season with the Blues in last place.

== History ==
Minor league baseball began in Alton, Illinois in 1917, when the Alton "Blues" became members of the eight–team, Class B level Illinois-Indiana-Iowa League. The Blues replaced the Davenport Blue Sox franchise in the league, which was nicknamed the "Three–I League." Alton was joined by the Bloomington Bloomers, Hannibal Mules, Moline Plowboys, Peoria Distillers, Quincy Gems, Rockford Rox and Rock Island Islanders in the beginning league play on May 3, 1917.

The Blues were so named, matching the blue trim on their uniforms.

On July 8, 1917, in the midst of World War I, the Illinois–Indiana–Iowa League received approval to cease play. The Alton Blues were in last place with a record of 18–44, playing under managers Harry Bay and Jim Duggan when the league folded. Eighth place Alton finished 23.0 games behind the first place Peoria Distillers.

Overall, the Alton Blues finished behind Peoria (43–23), Rockford Rox (39–21), Hannibal Mules (39–27), Rock Island Islanders (36–26), Moline Plowboys (27–38), Quincy Gems (27–38) and Bloomington Bloomers (25–37) in the 1917 league standings.

After the Illinois–Indiana–Iowa League shortened the 1917 season, the league did not play in 1918 due to World War I, with many minor leagues folding during the 1918 season. The Illinois–Indiana–Iowa League returned in 1919 as a six–team league, but without an Alton franchise. Hannibal, Quincy and Rock Island franchises were also absent from the 1919 six-team league, consisting of the Bloomington Bloomers, Evansville Evas, Moline Plowboys, Peoria Tractors, Rockford Rox and Terre Haute Browns teams as league members. Alton, Illinois has not hosted another minor league team.

In 2021, organized baseball returned to Alton, Illinois when the Alton River Dragons franchise began play. The River Dragons became members of the Prospect League, a summer collegiate baseball league.

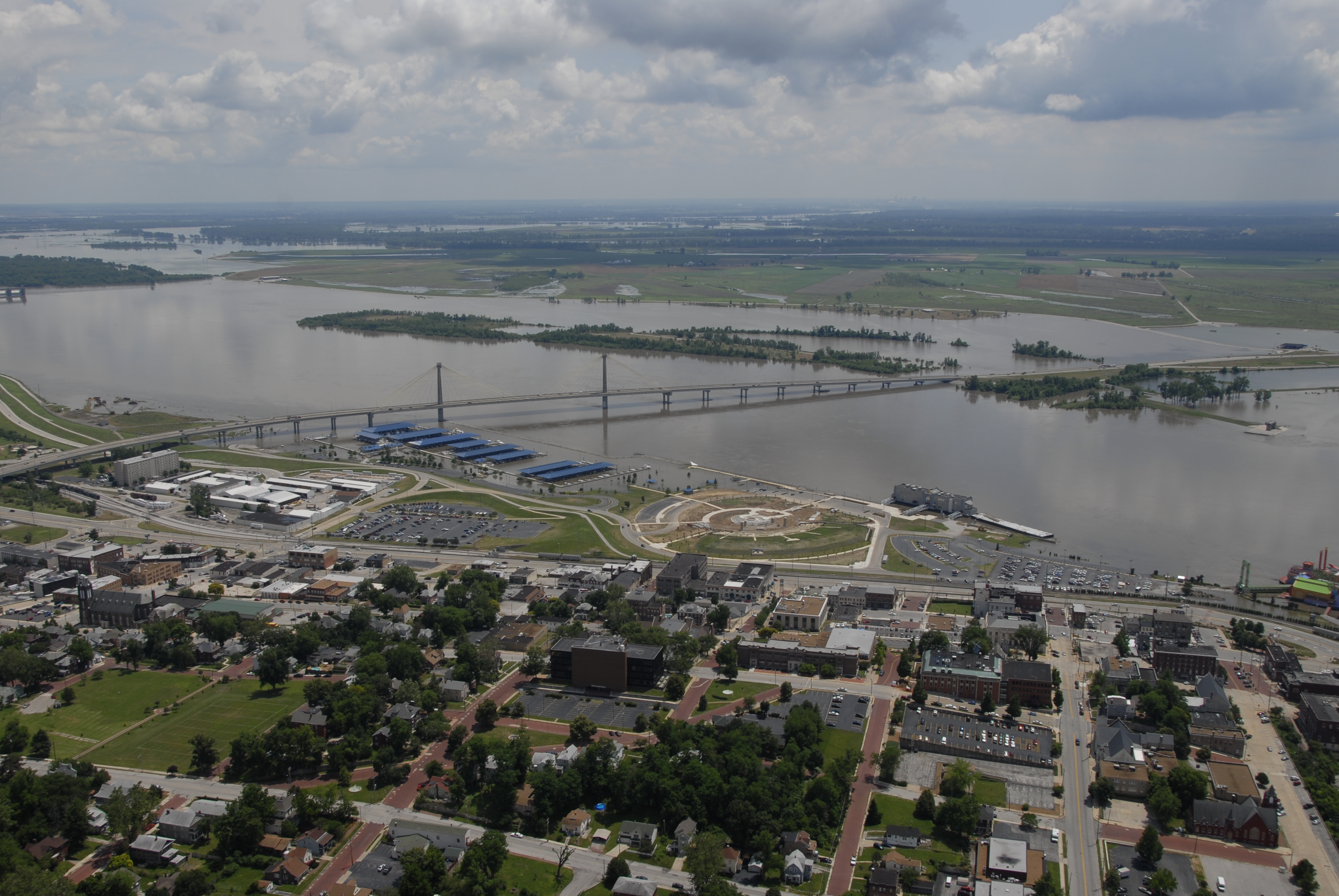
(2008) Mississippi River at Alton, Illinois

== The ballpark ==
The 1917 Alton Blues hosted minor league home games at Sportsman's Park. While the Alton Blues played there, the park was nicknamed "Three-I League Park." The ballpark was built in 1911. Today, the Alton Police Department occupies the site. The location of the police department facility is 1700 East Broadway in Alton, Illinois.

== Year–by–year record ==
Year	Record	Finish	Manager	Playoffs/Notes
1917	18–44	8th	Harry Bay / Jim Duggan	League folded July 8

== Notable alumni ==
- Harry Bay (1917, MGR) 2× AL stolen base leader
- Jim Duggan (1917, MGR)
- Frank Fletcher (1917)
- Bill Cristall (1917)
- Mickey O'Neil (1917)

== See also ==
- Alton Blues players
