= Clyde Southwick =

American baseball player (1886–1961)

- Catcher
- Born: November 3, 1886; Maxwell, Iowa
- Died: October 14, 1961 (aged 74); Freeport, Illinois
- Batted: Left Threw: Right

MLB debut
- August 22, 1911, for the St. Louis Browns

Last MLB appearance
- September 9, 1911, for the St. Louis Browns

MLB statistics
- Games played: 4
- At bats: 12
- Hits: 3
- Stats at Baseball Reference

Teams
- St. Louis Browns (1911)

Clyde Aubra Southwick (November 3, 1886 – October 14, 1961) was a catcher in Major League Baseball. He played for the St. Louis Browns in 1911. He was well known throughout the league by his nickname, "Cheese", and he is even referred to as "Cheese Southwick" on some vintage baseball cards.
