= John Black (baseball) =

American baseball player (1890–1962)

- First baseman
- Born: February 23, 1890; Covington, Kentucky
- Died: March 20, 1962 (aged 72); Rutherford, New Jersey
- Batted: Right Threw: Right

MLB debut
- June 20, 1911, for the St. Louis Browns

Last MLB appearance
- September 12, 1911, for the St. Louis Browns

MLB statistics
- Batting average: .151
- Home runs: 0
- Runs batted in: 7
- Stats at Baseball Reference

Teams
- St. Louis Browns (1911)

John Falconor Black (February 23, 1890 – March 20, 1962), was a Major League Baseball first baseman who played in 1911 with the St. Louis Browns.
