= Joe Willis (baseball) =

American baseball player (1890–1966)

- Pitcher
- Born: April 9, 1890; Coal Grove, Ohio
- Died: December 4, 1966 (aged 76); Ironton, Ohio
- Batted: Right Threw: Left

MLB debut
- May 3, 1911, for the St. Louis Browns

Last MLB appearance
- June 10, 1913, for the St. Louis Cardinals

MLB statistics
- Win–loss record: 4–11
- Strikeouts: 66
- Earned run average: 4.63
- Stats at Baseball Reference

Teams
- St. Louis Browns (1911); St. Louis Cardinals (1911–1913)

Joseph Denk Willis (April 9, 1890 – December 4, 1966) was a Major League Baseball pitcher. He played all or part of three seasons in the majors, from 1911 until 1913, for the St. Louis Browns and St. Louis Cardinals. Following his major league career, he continued to pitch in the minor leagues until 1920.

== Sources ==
- Career statistics from Baseball Reference, or Baseball Reference (Minors)
