= Steamboat Johnson =

American baseball umpire (1880-1951)

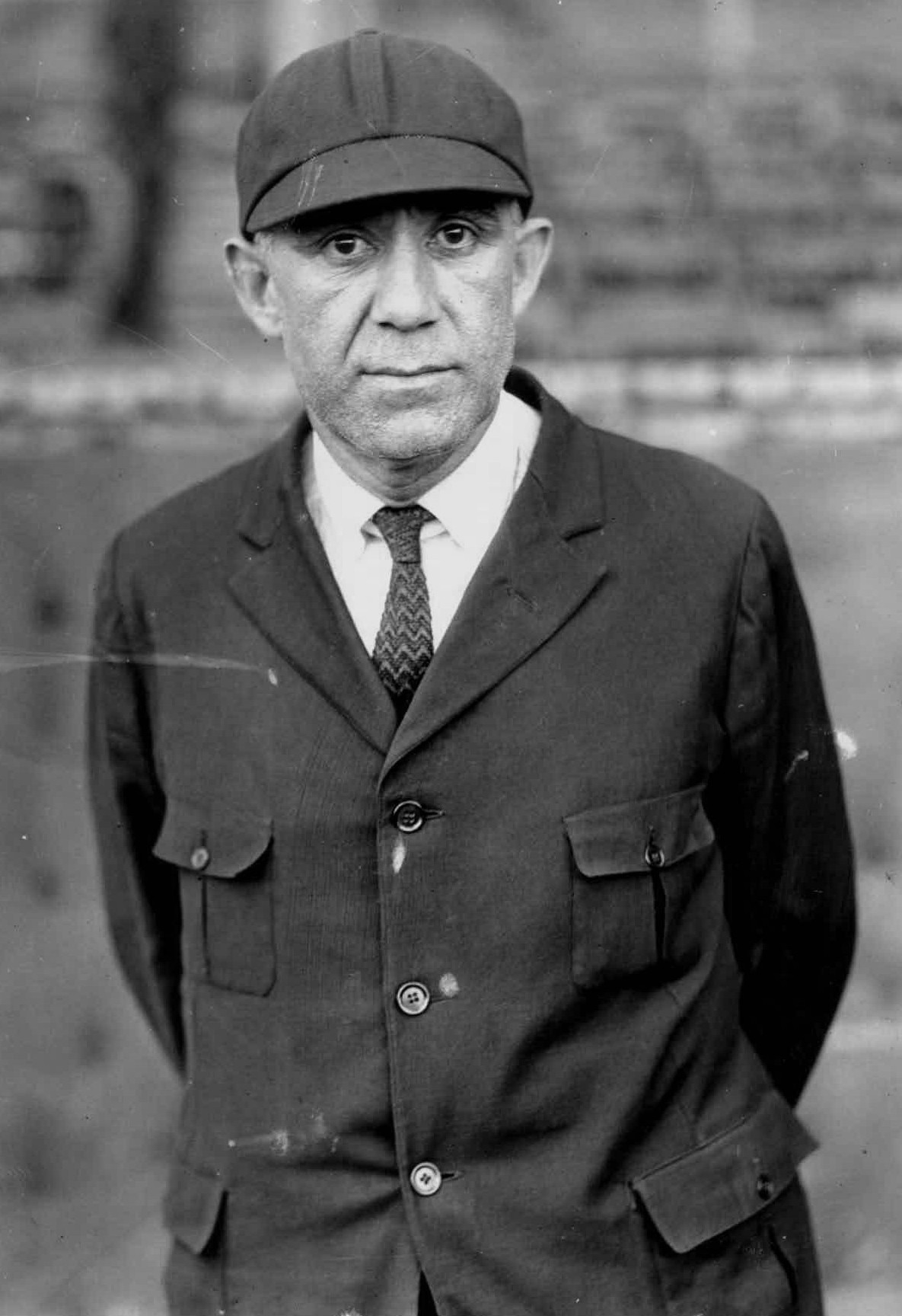
- Johnson in 1920
- Born: Harry Samuel Johnson; March 26, 1880; Pottsville, Pennsylvania, U.S.
- Died: February 20, 1951 (aged 70); Memphis, Tennessee, U.S.
- Resting place: Memphis, Tennessee
- Occupation: Major League Baseball umpire
- Years active: 1914

Harry Samuel "Steamboat" Johnson (March 26, 1880 – February 20, 1951) was an American professional baseball umpire.

Johnson, born in Pennsylvania in 1880, was a long-time umpire in the minor leagues — including the Western League, Three-I League, and Southern Association — who also umpired 66 games in the National League in 1914. He issued 11 ejections during that season, including New York Giants manager John McGraw twice in two days at the end of July.

Johnson's nickname came from a reporter for The Atlanta Georgian, who wrote, "None of us know where John D. Martin (president of the Southern Association) got this Umpire Johnson, but he has a voice like a Mississippi River steamboat. From now he is ‘Steamboat’ Johnson to Atlantans." In 1923, Johnson declared a spring training game a forfeit against the Detroit Tigers, after player-manager Ty Cobb had been ejected by Johnson's fellow umpire but refused to leave the field.

In 1935, Johnson published his memoirs, Standing the Gaff, which is considered a baseball classic. He estimated that he had umpired over 4,000 games and made a million decisions. Johnson never used tobacco or alcohol, and in later life opened an umpiring school. He died in Memphis, Tennessee, in 1951 at age 70.

== Works ==
- Johnson, Harry (2005). Standing the Gaff: The Life and Hard Times of a Minor League Umpire (2nd ed.). University of Alabama Press. ISBN 978-0817352745.

== See also ==
- List of Major League Baseball umpires (disambiguation)
