= Allie Moulton =

American baseball player (1886-1968)

- Second baseman
- Born: January 16, 1886; Medway, Massachusetts, U.S.
- Died: July 10, 1968 (aged 82); Peabody, Massachusetts, U.S.
- Batted: Right Threw: Right

MLB debut
- September 25, 1911, for the St. Louis Browns

Last MLB appearance
- September 30, 1911, for the St. Louis Browns

MLB statistics
- Batting average: .067
- Home runs: 0
- Runs batted in: 1
- Stats at Baseball Reference

Teams
- St. Louis Browns (1911)

Albert Theodore Moulton (January 16, 1886 – July 10, 1968) was an American Major League Baseball second baseman who played in 1911 with the St. Louis Browns.
