= Dave Rowan =

Canadian baseball player (1882-1955)

- First baseman
- Born: December 6, 1882; Elora, Ontario, Canada
- Died: July 30, 1955 (aged 72); Toronto, Ontario, Canada
- Batted: Left Threw: Left

MLB debut
- May 27, 1911, for the St. Louis Browns

Last MLB appearance
- June 22, 1911, for the St. Louis Browns

MLB statistics
- Batting average: .385
- Home runs: 0
- Runs batted in: 11
- Stats at Baseball Reference

Teams
- St. Louis Browns (1911)

David Rowan (born David Drohan, December 6, 1882 – July 30, 1955) was a Canadian Major League Baseball first baseman who played for the St. Louis Browns in 1911. A native of Elora, Ontario, Canada, the 28-year-old rookie stood 5'11" and weighed 175 lbs.

Rowan spent about a month with St. Louis, playing in his first game May 27 and his last on June 22. He appeared in 18 games and hit .385 (25-for-65) with 11 runs batted in and 7 runs scored. He drew 4 walks which pushed his on-base percentage up to .420. At first base he handled 172 out of 182 total chances successfully for a fielding percentage of .945, which was well below the league average at the time.

Rowan's minor league career spanned ten seasons, from 1905 until 1914. He also managed the minor league Peoria Distillers in 1910 and 1911 and the Peterborough Whitecaps in 1912.

Rowan died at the age of 72 in Toronto, Ontario, Canada.
