= Lefty George =

American baseball player (1886–1955)

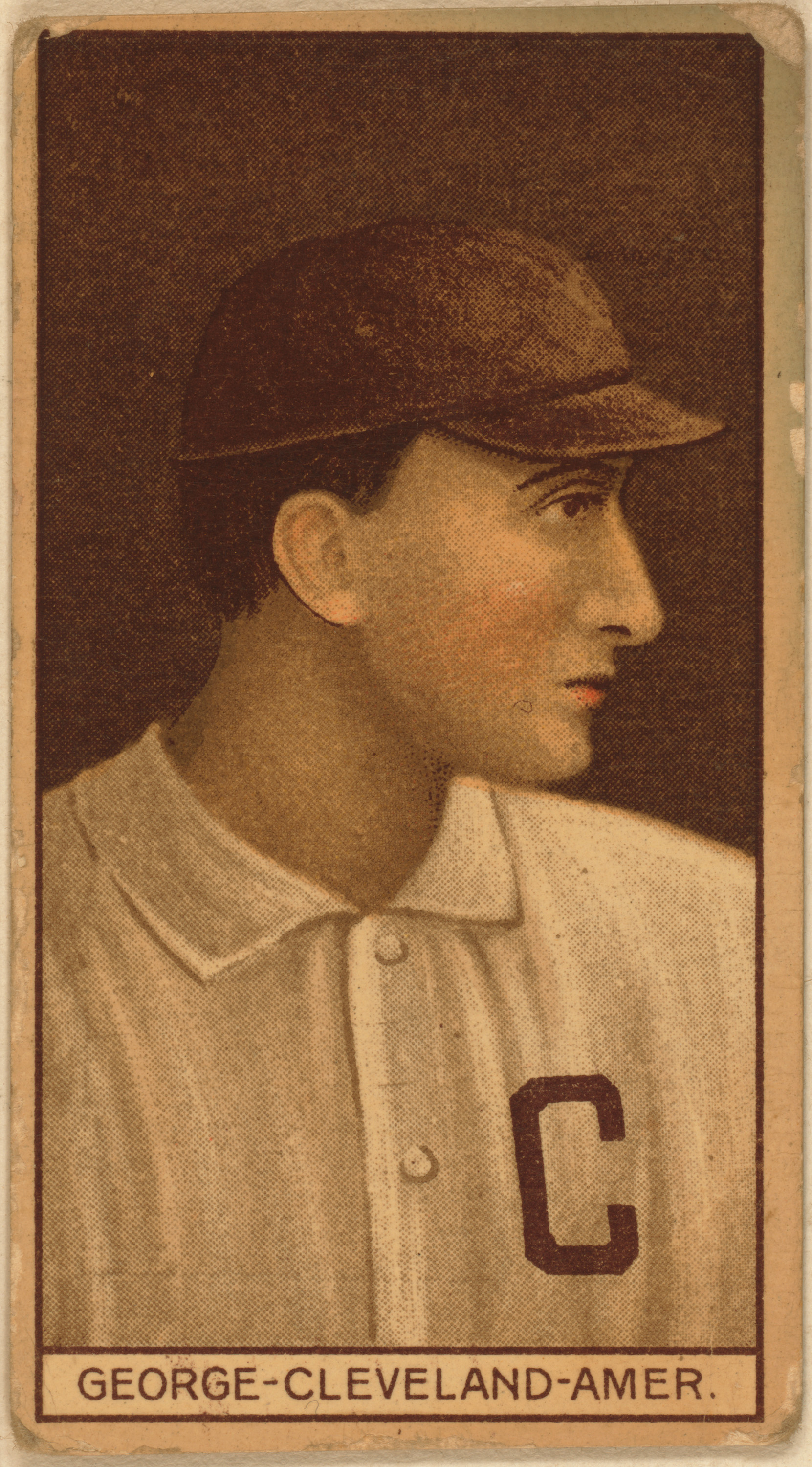
- 1912 baseball card
- Pitcher
- Born: August 13, 1886; Pittsburgh, Pennsylvania, U.S.
- Died: May 13, 1955 (aged 68); York, Pennsylvania, U.S.
- Batted: Left Threw: Left

MLB debut
- April 14, 1911, for the St. Louis Browns

Last MLB appearance
- August 24, 1918, for the Boston Braves

MLB statistics
- Win–loss record: 7-21
- Earned run average: 3.85
- Strikeouts: 74
- Stats at Baseball Reference

Teams
- St. Louis Browns (1911); Cleveland Naps (1912); Cincinnati Reds (1915); Boston Braves (1918)

Thomas Edward "Lefty" George (August 13, 1886 – May 13, 1955) was an American Major League Baseball pitcher who played for four seasons. He played for the St. Louis Browns in 1911, the Cleveland Naps in 1912, the Cincinnati Reds in 1915, and the Boston Braves in 1918.
