= George Curry (baseball) =

American baseball player (1888–1963)

- Pitcher
- Born: December 23, 1888; Bridgeport, Connecticut
- Died: October 5, 1963 (aged 74); West Haven, Connecticut
- Batted: Right Threw: Right

MLB debut
- July 16, 1911, for the St. Louis Browns

Last MLB appearance
- September 7, 1911, for the St. Louis Browns

MLB statistics
- Win–loss record: 0–3
- Earned run average: 7.47
- Strikeouts: 2

Teams
- St. Louis Browns (1911)

George James "Soldier Boy" Curry (December 23, 1888 – October 5, 1963) was a Major League Baseball pitcher. Curry played for the St. Louis Browns in 1911.
