= Jim Duggan (baseball) =

American baseball player (1885–1951)

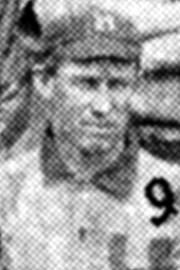
- First baseman
- Born: June 1, 1885; Whiteland, Indiana, U.S.
- Died: December 5, 1951 (aged 66); Indianapolis, Indiana, U.S.
- Batted: Left Threw: Left

MLB debut
- June 29, 1911, for the St. Louis Browns

Last MLB appearance
- June 29, 1911, for the St. Louis Browns

MLB statistics
- Batting average: .000
- Home runs: 0
- Runs batted in: 1
- Stats at Baseball Reference

Teams
- St. Louis Browns (1911)

James Elmer Duggan (June 1, 1885 – December 5, 1951) was an American professional baseball player. Except for one game with St. Louis Browns in 1911, first baseman Duggan spent his entire 11-year professional career in the minor leagues.

== Early life and career ==
Duggan born on Monday, June 1, 1885, in Whiteland, Indiana. He graduated from Whiteland High School and attended Franklin College before entering pro ball with the Atlanta Crackers of the Southern Association in 1906. He was playing for the Holyoke, Massachusetts Papermakers (Connecticut League) in 1911 when the franchise folded on June 20. A few days later, the Browns summoned him to Detroit for a game with the Tigers. Batting seventh, Duggan went hitless in four at bats, drew a walk, drove in a run and scored once in a 6-5 St. Louis victory. It would be his only major league appearance.

== After the majors ==
Duggan's last six professional seasons were spent in the Three-I League. Starting in 1912, he spent four years in Decatur, Illinois, and in 1915 he was the Commodores' playing manager. He split the 1916 season between the Rock Island Islanders. and Davenport Blue Sox. He finished his career in 1917 as a player-manager with the Blues of Alton, Illinois.

In 1918 Duggan entered the army, He was on board a ship bound for Europe when World War I ended.

Johnny Duggan, Jim's brother, was a minor league outfielder.
