= Ed Hallinan =

American baseball player (1888-1940)

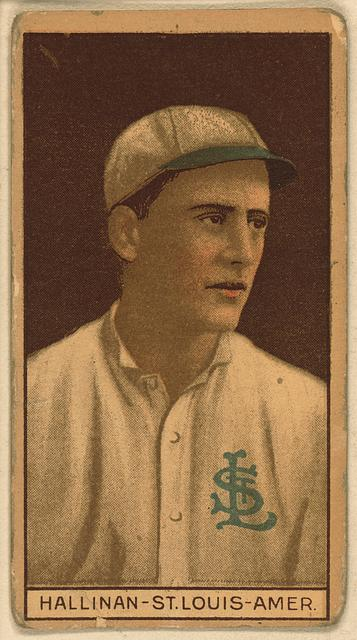
- Shortstop
- Born: August 23, 1888; San Francisco, California, U.S.
- Died: August 24, 1940 (aged 52); San Francisco, California, U.S.
- Batted: Right Threw: Right

MLB debut
- May 13, 1911, for the St. Louis Browns

Last MLB appearance
- August 10, 1912, for the St. Louis Browns

MLB statistics
- Batting average: .212
- Home runs: 0
- Runs batted in: 15
- Stats at Baseball Reference

Teams
- St. Louis Browns (1911–1912)

Edward S. Hallinan (August 23, 1888 – August 24, 1940) was an American shortstop in Major League Baseball. He played for the St. Louis Browns.

== Biography ==
Born in San Francisco, Hallinan spent two years in the major leagues with the St. Louis Browns. He served in World War I and then worked for the San Francisco County Clerk's office for more than 20 years. He died of cancer in 1940.
