= Bill Harper (baseball) =

American baseball player (1889-1951)

- Pitcher
- Born: June 14, 1889; Bertrand, Missouri, U.S.
- Died: June 17, 1951 (aged 62); Somerville, Tennessee, U.S.
- Batted: Switch Threw: Right

MLB debut
- June 10, 1911, for the St. Louis Browns

Last MLB appearance
- June 20, 1911, for the St. Louis Browns

MLB statistics
- Win–loss record: 0-0
- Strikeouts: 6
- Earned run average: 6.75
- Stats at Baseball Reference

Teams
- St. Louis Browns (1911)

William Horner Harper (June 14, 1889 – June 17, 1951) was an American Major League Baseball pitcher. He appeared in two games for the St. Louis Browns in 1911.
