= Al Clancy =

American baseball player (1888-1951)

- Third baseman
- Born: August 14, 1888; Santa Fe, New Mexico
- Died: October 17, 1951 (aged 63); Las Cruces, New Mexico
- Batted: Right Threw: Right

MLB debut
- June 20, 1911, for the St. Louis Browns

Last MLB appearance
- June 25, 1911, for the St. Louis Browns

MLB statistics
- Batting average: .000
- Home runs: 0
- Runs batted in: 0
- Stats at Baseball Reference

Teams
- St. Louis Browns (1911)

Albert Harrison Clancy (August 14, 1888 – October 17, 1951) was a Major League Baseball player. Clancy, a third baseman, was a right-handed batter who threw with his right arm. He had an official listed weight of 175 pounds.

Clancy appeared in three games with the St. Louis Browns in 1911. He was hitless in five at bats, reaching base once on a hit by pitch. He was the first major league player from New Mexico.
