= 1923 Boston Red Sox season =

Major League Baseball season

1923 Boston Red Sox
- League: American League
- Ballpark: Fenway Park
- City: Boston, Massachusetts
- Record: 61–91 (.401)
- League place: 8th
- Owners: J. A. Robert Quinn
- Managers: Frank Chance
- Stats: ESPN.com; Baseball Reference

The 1923 Boston Red Sox season was the 23rd season in the franchise's Major League Baseball history. The Red Sox finished last in the eight-team American League (AL) with a record of 61 wins and 91 losses, 37 games behind the New York Yankees, who went on to win the 1923 World Series.

== Regular season ==
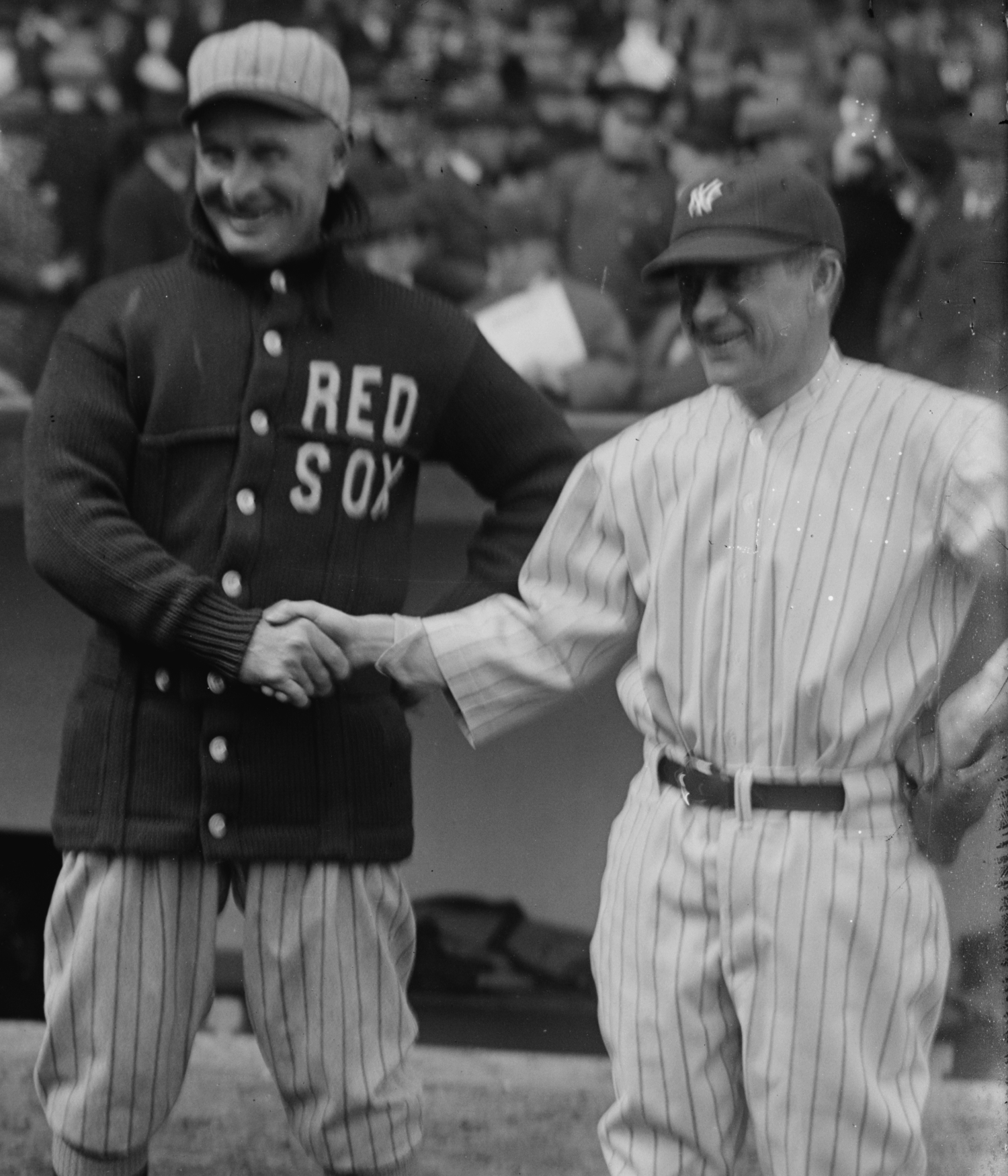
Red Sox manager Frank Chance with New York Yankees manager Miller Huggins on Opening Day at Yankee Stadium

- September 14, 1923: George Burns of the Red Sox executed an unassisted triple play. He caught a line drive, tagged the runner off first base and tagged second base before the runner returned.

=== Season standings ===
American League
Team	W	L	Pct.	GB	Home	Road
New York Yankees	98	54	.645	—	46‍–‍30	52‍–‍24
Detroit Tigers	83	71	.539	16	45‍–‍32	38‍–‍39
Cleveland Indians	82	71	.536	16½	42‍–‍36	40‍–‍35
Washington Senators	75	78	.490	23½	43‍–‍34	32‍–‍44
St. Louis Browns	74	78	.487	24	40‍–‍36	34‍–‍42
Philadelphia Athletics	69	83	.454	29	34‍–‍41	35‍–‍42
Chicago White Sox	69	85	.448	30	30‍–‍45	39‍–‍40
Boston Red Sox	61	91	.401	37	37‍–‍40	24‍–‍51

=== Record vs. opponents ===
1923 American League record Sources:
Team	BOS	CWS	CLE	DET	NYY	PHA	SLB	WSH
Boston	—	9–13	10–12	10–12–1	8–14	13–7	4–18–1	7–15
Chicago	13–9	—	9–13	9–13	7–15	10–12	11–11–1	10–12–1
Cleveland	12–10	13–9	—	9–13	12–10	12–10	14–8	10–11
Detroit	12–10–1	13–9	13–9	—	10–12	12–10	12–10	11–11
New York	14–8	15–7	10–12	12–10	—	16–6	15–5	16–6
Philadelphia	7–13	12–10	10–12	10–12	6–16	—	9–13	15–7–1
St. Louis	18–4–1	11–11–1	8–14	10–12	5–15	13–9	—	9–13
Washington	15–7	12–10–1	11–10	11–11	6–16	7–15–1	13–9	—

=== Opening Day lineup ===
Chick Fewster	SS
Shano Collins	RF
Camp Skinner	CF
Joe Harris	LF
George Burns	1B
Norm McMillan	2B
Howard Shanks	3B
Al DeVormer	C
Howard Ehmke	P

=== Roster ===
1923 Boston Red Sox
Roster
Pitchers: Dave Black; Clarence Blethen; Howard Ehmke; Alex Ferguson; Curt Fullerton; Les Howe; George Murray; Lefty O'Doul; Bill Piercy; Jack Quinn; Carl Stimson	Catchers: Al DeVormer; Val Picinich; Roxy Walters; Infielders: George Burns; Chick Fewster; Frank Fuller; Norm McMillan; Johnny Mitchell; Pinky Pittenger; Howie Shanks	Outfielders: Ike Boone; Shano Collins; John Donahue; Ira Flagstead; Joe Harris; Nemo Leibold; Mike Menosky; Dick Reichle; Camp Skinner	Manager: Frank Chance; Coaches: Jimmy Burke (Pitching); Jack Ryan (Pitching)

== Player stats ==
=== Batting ===
==== Starters by position ====
Note: Pos = Position; G = Games played; AB = At bats; H = Hits; Avg. = Batting average; HR = Home runs; RBI = Runs batted in

Pos	Player	G	AB	H	Avg.	HR	RBI
C	Val Picinich	87	268	74	.276	2	31
1B	George Burns	146	551	181	.328	7	82
2B	Chick Fewster	90	284	67	.236	0	15
SS	Johnny Mitchell	92	347	78	.225	0	19
3B	Howie Shanks	131	464	118	.254	3	57
OF	Dick Reichle	122	361	93	.258	1	39
OF	Joe Harris	142	483	162	.335	13	76
OF	Ira Flagstead	109	382	119	.312	8	53

==== Other batters ====
Note: G = Games played; AB = At bats; H = Hits; Avg. = Batting average; HR = Home runs; RBI = Runs batted in

Player	G	AB	H	Avg.	HR	RBI
Norm McMillan	131	459	116	.253	0	42
Shano Collins	97	342	79	.231	0	18
Al DeVormer	74	209	54	.258	0	18
Mike Menosky	84	188	43	.229	0	25
Pinky Pittenger	60	177	38	.215	0	15
Roxy Walters	40	104	26	.250	0	5
John Donahue	10	36	10	.278	0	1
Frank Fuller	6	21	5	.238	0	0
Nemo Leibold	12	18	2	.111	0	0
Ike Boone	5	15	4	.267	0	2
Camp Skinner	7	13	3	.231	0	1

=== Pitching ===
==== Starting pitchers ====
Note: G = Games pitched; IP = Innings pitched; W = Wins; L = Losses; ERA = Earned run average; SO = Strikeouts

Player	G	IP	W	L	ERA	SO
Howard Ehmke	43	316.2	20	17	3.78	121
Jack Quinn	42	243.0	13	17	3.89	71
Alex Ferguson	34	198.1	9	13	4.04	72
Bill Piercy	30	187.1	8	17	3.41	51

==== Other pitchers ====
Note: G = Games pitched; IP = Innings pitched; W = Wins; L = Losses; ERA = Earned run average; SO = Strikeouts

Player	G	IP	W	L	ERA	SO
George Murray	39	177.2	7	11	4.91	40
Curt Fullerton	37	143.1	2	15	5.09	37
Les Howe	12	30.0	1	0	2.40	7

==== Relief pitchers ====
Note: G = Games pitched; W = Wins; L = Losses; SV = Saves; ERA = Earned run average; SO = Strikeouts

Player	G	W	L	SV	ERA	SO
Lefty O'Doul	23	1	1	0	5.43	10
Clarence Blethen	5	0	0	0	7.13	2
Carl Stimson	2	0	0	0	22.50	1
Dave Black	2	0	0	0	0.00	0
