= 1924 Boston Red Sox season =

Major League Baseball season

1924 Boston Red Sox
- League: American League
- Ballpark: Fenway Park
- City: Boston, Massachusetts
- Record: 67–87 (.435)
- League place: 7th
- Owners: J. A. Robert Quinn
- Managers: Lee Fohl
- Stats: ESPN.com; Baseball Reference

The 1924 Boston Red Sox season was the 24th season in the franchise's Major League Baseball history. The Red Sox finished seventh in the American League (AL) with a record of 67 wins and 87 losses, 25 games behind the Washington Senators, who went on to win the 1924 World Series.

== Regular season ==
=== Season standings ===
American League
Team	W	L	Pct.	GB	Home	Road
Washington Senators	92	62	.597	—	47‍–‍30	45‍–‍32
New York Yankees	89	63	.586	2	45‍–‍32	44‍–‍31
Detroit Tigers	86	68	.558	6	45‍–‍33	41‍–‍35
St. Louis Browns	74	78	.487	17	41‍–‍36	33‍–‍42
Philadelphia Athletics	71	81	.467	20	36‍–‍39	35‍–‍42
Cleveland Indians	67	86	.438	24½	37‍–‍38	30‍–‍48
Boston Red Sox	67	87	.435	25	41‍–‍36	26‍–‍51
Chicago White Sox	66	87	.431	25½	37‍–‍39	29‍–‍48

=== Record vs. opponents ===
1924 American League record Sources:
Team	BOS	CWS	CLE	DET	NYY	PHA	SLB	WSH
Boston	—	10–12	14–8	6–16	5–17–1	12–10	11–11–1	9–13–1
Chicago	12–10	—	11–11	8–14–1	6–16	11–11	13–8	5–17
Cleveland	8–14	11–11	—	7–15	8–14	11–11	11–10	11–11
Detroit	16–6	14–8–1	15–7	—	13–9	11–11	9–13	8–14–1
New York	17–5–1	16–6	14–8	9–13	—	12–8	12–10	9–13
Philadelphia	10–12	11–11	11–11	11–11	8–12	—	13–9	7–15
St. Louis	11–11–1	8–13	10–11	13–9	10–12	9–13	—	13–9
Washington	13–9–1	17–5	11–11	14–8–1	13–9	15–7	9–13	—

=== Opening Day lineup ===
Ira Flagstead	CF
Bill Wambsganss	2B
Bobby Veach	LF
Joe Harris	1B
Ike Boone	RF
Howard Shanks	3B
Dud Lee	SS
Steve O'Neill	C
Howard Ehmke	P

=== Roster ===
1924 Boston Red Sox
Roster
Pitchers: Howard Ehmke; Alex Ferguson; Oscar Fuhr; Curt Fullerton; Les Howe; Lefty Jamerson; Al Kellett; George Murray; Bill Piercy; Jack Quinn; Buster Ross; Red Ruffing; Ted Wingfield; Clarence Winters; John Woods; Hoge Workman	Catchers: Johnnie Heving; Steve O'Neill; Val Picinich; Infielders: Danny Clark; Homer Ezzell; Chappie Geygan; Joe Harris; Dud Lee; Howie Shanks; Phil Todt; Bill Wambsganss	Outfielders: Ike Boone; Shano Collins; Joe Connolly; Ira Flagstead; Bobby Veach; Denny Williams	Manager: Lee Fohl; Coaches: Lefty Leifield; Jack Ryan (Pitching)

== Player stats ==
=== Batting ===
==== Starters by position ====
Note: Pos = Position; G = Games played; AB = At bats; H = Hits; Avg. = Batting average; HR = Home runs; RBI = Runs batted in

Pos	Player	G	AB	H	Avg.	HR	RBI
C	Steve O'Neill	106	307	73	.238	0	38
1B	Joe Harris	133	491	148	.301	3	77
2B	Bill Wambsganss	156	636	174	.274	0	49
SS	Dud Lee	94	288	73	.253	0	29
3B	Danny Clark	104	325	90	.277	2	54
OF	Ike Boone	128	487	164	.337	13	98
OF	Ira Flagstead	149	560	172	.307	5	43
OF	Bobby Veach	142	519	153	.295	5	99

==== Other batters ====
Note: G = Games played; AB = At bats; H = Hits; Avg. = Batting average; HR = Home runs; RBI = Runs batted in

Player	G	AB	H	Avg.	HR	RBI
Homer Ezzell	90	277	75	.271	0	32
Shano Collins	89	240	70	.292	0	28
Howie Shanks	72	193	50	.259	0	25
Val Picinich	69	161	44	.273	1	24
Johnnie Heving	45	109	31	.284	0	11
Phil Todt	52	103	27	.262	1	14
Denny Williams	25	85	31	.365	0	4
Chappie Geygan	33	82	21	.256	0	4
Joe Connolly	14	10	1	.100	0	1

=== Pitching ===
==== Starting pitchers ====
Note: G = Games pitched; IP = Innings pitched; W = Wins; L = Losses; ERA = Earned run average; SO = Strikeouts

Player	G	IP	W	L	ERA	SO
Howard Ehmke	45	315.0	19	17	3.46	119
Alex Ferguson	41	237.2	14	17	3.79	78
Bill Piercy	23	121.0	5	7	5.95	20
Ted Wingfield	4	25.2	0	2	2.45	4

==== Other pitchers ====
Note: G = Games pitched; IP = Innings pitched; W = Wins; L = Losses; ERA = Earned run average; SO = Strikeouts

Player	G	IP	W	L	ERA	SO
Jack Quinn	44	228.2	12	13	3.27	64
Curt Fullerton	33	152.0	7	12	4.32	33
George Murray	28	80.1	2	9	6.72	27
Oscar Fuhr	23	80.1	3	6	5.94	30
Red Ruffing	8	23.0	0	0	6.65	10
Clarence Winters	4	7.0	0	1	20.57	3

==== Relief pitchers ====
Note: G = Games pitched; W = Wins; L = Losses; SV = Saves; ERA = Earned run average; SO = Strikeouts

Player	G	W	L	SV	ERA	SO
Buster Ross	30	4	3	1	3.47	16
Hoge Workman	11	0	0	0	8.50	7
Les Howe	4	1	0	0	7.36	3
Lefty Jamerson	1	0	0	0	18.00	0
John Woods	1	0	0	0	0.00	0
Al Kellett	1	0	0	0	∞	0
