= 1922 Boston Red Sox season =

Major League Baseball season

1922 Boston Red Sox
- League: American League
- Ballpark: Fenway Park
- City: Boston, Massachusetts
- Record: 61–93 (.396)
- League place: 8th
- Owners: Harry Frazee
- Managers: Hugh Duffy
- Stats: ESPN.com; Baseball Reference

The 1922 Boston Red Sox season was the 22nd season in the franchise's Major League Baseball history. The Red Sox finished last in the eight-team American League (AL) with a record of 61 wins and 93 losses, 33 games behind the New York Yankees.

== Regular season ==
=== Season standings ===
American League
Team	W	L	Pct.	GB	Home	Road
New York Yankees	94	60	.610	—	50‍–‍27	44‍–‍33
St. Louis Browns	93	61	.604	1	54‍–‍23	39‍–‍38
Detroit Tigers	79	75	.513	15	43‍–‍34	36‍–‍41
Cleveland Indians	78	76	.506	16	44‍–‍35	34‍–‍41
Chicago White Sox	77	77	.500	17	43‍–‍34	34‍–‍43
Washington Senators	69	85	.448	25	40‍–‍39	29‍–‍46
Philadelphia Athletics	65	89	.422	29	38‍–‍39	27‍–‍50
Boston Red Sox	61	93	.396	33	31‍–‍42	30‍–‍51

=== Record vs. opponents ===
1922 American League record Sources:
Team	BOS	CWS	CLE	DET	NYY	PHA	SLB	WSH
Boston	—	10–12	6–16	5–17	13–9	10–12	7–15	10–12
Chicago	12–10	—	12–10–1	17–5	9–13	12–10	8–14	7–15
Cleveland	16–6	10–12–1	—	15–7	7–15	11–11	6–16	13–9
Detroit	17–5	5–17	7–15	—	11–11	16–6–1	9–13	14–8
New York	9–13	13–9	15–7	11–11	—	17–5	14–8	15–7
Philadelphia	12–10	10–12	11–11	6–16–1	5–17	—	9–13	12–10
St. Louis	15–7	14–8	16–6	13–9	8–14	13–9	—	14–8
Washington	12–10	15–7	9–13	8–14	7–15	10–12	8–14	—

=== Opening Day lineup ===
Mike Menosky	CF
Elmer Smith	RF
Del Pratt	2B
Joe Harris	LF
George Burns	1B
Pinky Pittenger	3B
Frank O'Rourke	SS
Muddy Ruel	C
Jack Quinn	P

=== Roster ===
1922 Boston Red Sox
Roster
Pitchers: Rip Collins; Sam Dodge; Alex Ferguson; Curt Fullerton; Benn Karr; Elmer Myers; Herb Pennock; Bill Piercy; Jack Quinn; Allen Russell	Catchers: Ed Chaplin; Walt Lynch; Muddy Ruel; Roxy Walters; Infielders: George Burns; Joe Dugan; Chick Fewster; Eddie Foster; Chick Maynard; Johnny Mitchell; Frank O'Rourke; Pinky Pittenger; Del Pratt	Outfielders: Shano Collins; Joe Harris; Nemo Leibold; Mike Menosky; Elmer Miller; Dick Reichle; Elmer Smith	Manager: Hugh Duffy; Coaches: Jimmy Burke (Pitching)

== Player stats ==
=== Batting ===
==== Starters by position ====
Note: Pos = Position; G = Games played; AB = At bats; H = Hits; Avg. = Batting average; HR = Home runs; RBI = Runs batted in

Pos	Player	G	AB	H	Avg.	HR	RBI
C	Muddy Ruel	116	361	92	.255	0	28
1B	George Burns	147	558	171	.306	12	73
2B	Del Pratt	154	607	183	.301	6	86
SS	Johnny Mitchell	59	203	51	.251	1	8
3B	Joe Dugan	84	341	98	.287	3	38
OF	Mike Menosky	126	406	115	.283	3	32
OF	Joe Harris	119	408	129	.316	6	54
OF	Shano Collins	135	472	128	.271	1	52

==== Other batters ====
Note: G = Games played; AB = At bats; H = Hits; Avg. = Batting average; HR = Home runs; RBI = Runs batted in

Player	G	AB	H	Avg.	HR	RBI
Nemo Leibold	81	271	70	.258	1	18
Elmer Smith	73	231	66	.286	6	32
Frank O'Rourke	67	216	57	.264	1	17
Pinky Pittenger	66	186	48	.258	0	7
Elmer Miller	44	147	28	.190	4	16
Eddie Foster	48	109	23	.211	0	3
Roxy Walters	38	98	19	.194	0	6
Chick Fewster	23	83	24	.289	0	9
Ed Chaplin	28	69	13	.188	0	6
Chick Maynard	12	24	3	.125	0	0
Dick Reichle	6	24	6	.250	0	0
Walt Lynch	3	2	1	.500	0	0

=== Pitching ===
==== Starting pitchers ====
Note: G = Games pitched; IP = Innings pitched; W = Wins; L = Losses; ERA = Earned run average; SO = Strikeouts

Player	G	IP	W	L	ERA	SO
Jack Quinn	40	256.0	13	16	3.48	67
Rip Collins	32	210.2	14	11	3.76	69
Herb Pennock	32	202.0	10	17	4.32	59
Alex Ferguson	39	198.1	9	16	4.31	44

==== Other pitchers ====
Note: G = Games pitched; IP = Innings pitched; W = Wins; L = Losses; ERA = Earned run average; SO = Strikeouts

Player	G	IP	W	L	ERA	SO
Benn Karr	41	183.1	5	12	4.47	41
Allen Russell	34	125.2	6	7	5.01	34
Bill Piercy	29	121.1	3	9	4.67	24
Elmer Myers	3	5.2	0	1	17.47	1

==== Relief pitchers ====
Note: G = Games pitched; W = Wins; L = Losses; SV = Saves; ERA = Earned run average; SO = Strikeouts

Player	G	W	L	SV	ERA	SO
Curt Fullerton	31	1	4	0	5.46	17
Sam Dodge	3	0	0	0	4.50	3
