= 1922 New York Yankees season =

Season for the Major League Baseball team the New York Yankees

1922 New York Yankees
- American League Champion
- League: American League
- Ballpark: Polo Grounds
- City: New York City, New York
- Record: 94–60 (.610)
- League place: 1st
- Owners: Jacob Ruppert and Tillinghast L'Hommedieu Huston
- General managers: Ed Barrow
- Managers: Miller Huggins

The 1922 New York Yankees season was the 20th season for the Yankees. The team finished with a record of 94 wins and 60 losses, to win their second pennant in franchise history, by a single game over the St. Louis Browns. New York was managed by Miller Huggins. Their home games were played at the Polo Grounds.

In the 1922 World Series, the Yankees again lost to their landlords, the New York Giants, 4 games to none with one tied game. The final game of the Series was also the Yankees' final game as a tenant in the Polo Grounds. During the season, they had begun construction of their new home, Yankee Stadium, which would open in 1923.

== Regular season ==
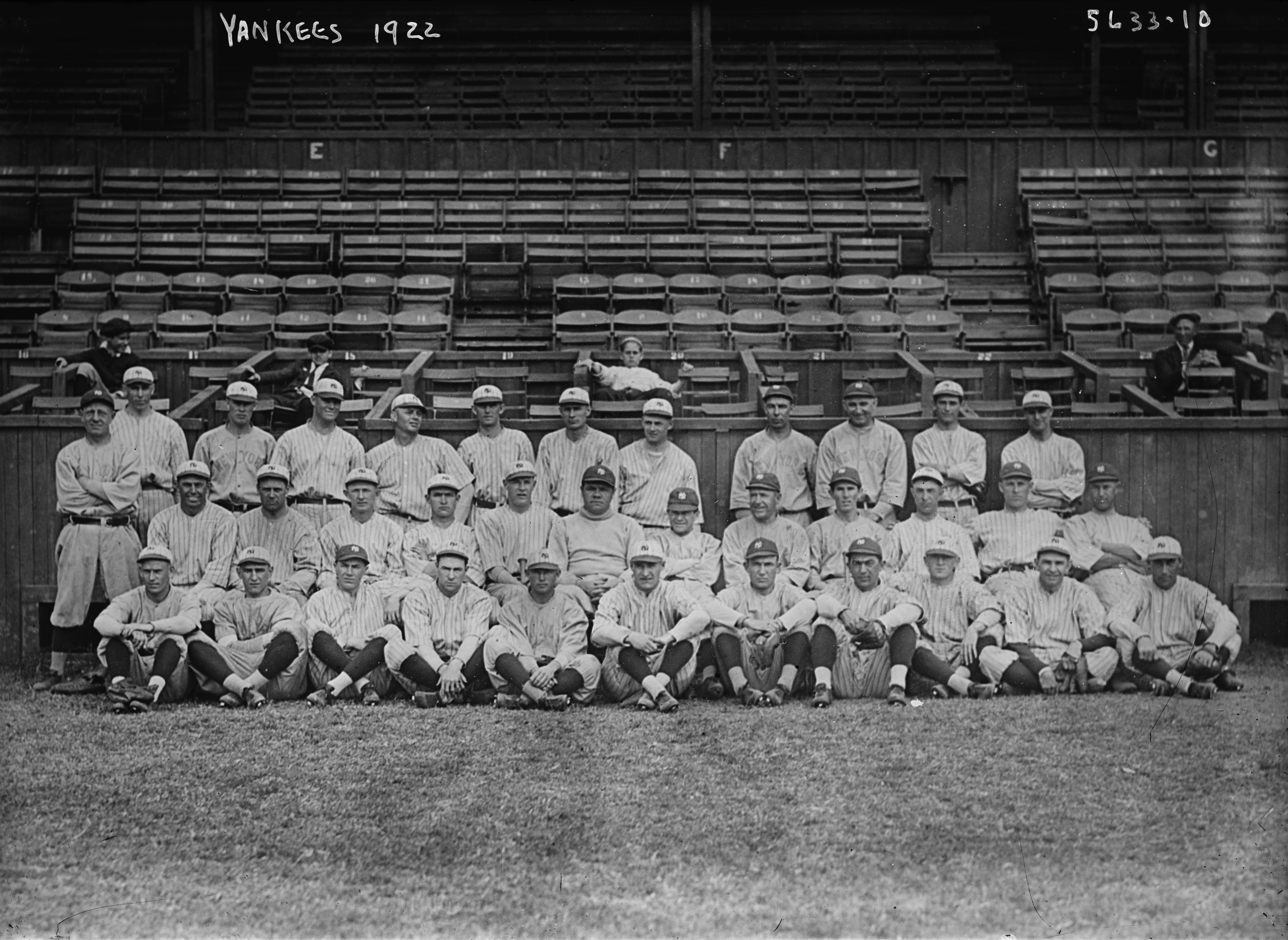
The 1922 New York Yankees

The Yankees started the season without their star, Babe Ruth, who was serving a suspension due to breaking the rule (along with several other Yankees) against World Series participants barnstorming. Although Commissioner Landis refused to back down on his enforcement of the rule, he did repeal the seemingly absurd rule by the end of the 1922 season.

=== Season standings ===
American League
Team	W	L	Pct.	GB	Home	Road
New York Yankees	94	60	.610	—	50‍–‍27	44‍–‍33
St. Louis Browns	93	61	.604	1	54‍–‍23	39‍–‍38
Detroit Tigers	79	75	.513	15	43‍–‍34	36‍–‍41
Cleveland Indians	78	76	.506	16	44‍–‍35	34‍–‍41
Chicago White Sox	77	77	.500	17	43‍–‍34	34‍–‍43
Washington Senators	69	85	.448	25	40‍–‍39	29‍–‍46
Philadelphia Athletics	65	89	.422	29	38‍–‍39	27‍–‍50
Boston Red Sox	61	93	.396	33	31‍–‍42	30‍–‍51

=== Record vs. opponents ===
1922 American League record Sources:
Team	BOS	CWS	CLE	DET	NYY	PHA	SLB	WSH
Boston	—	10–12	6–16	5–17	13–9	10–12	7–15	10–12
Chicago	12–10	—	12–10–1	17–5	9–13	12–10	8–14	7–15
Cleveland	16–6	10–12–1	—	15–7	7–15	11–11	6–16	13–9
Detroit	17–5	5–17	7–15	—	11–11	16–6–1	9–13	14–8
New York	9–13	13–9	15–7	11–11	—	17–5	14–8	15–7
Philadelphia	12–10	10–12	11–11	6–16–1	5–17	—	9–13	12–10
St. Louis	15–7	14–8	16–6	13–9	8–14	13–9	—	14–8
Washington	12–10	15–7	9–13	8–14	7–15	10–12	8–14	—

=== Roster ===
1922 New York Yankees
Roster
Pitchers: Joe Bush; Waite Hoyt; Sam Jones; Clem Llewellyn; Carl Mays; George Murray; Lefty O'Doul; Bob Shawkey	Catchers: Al DeVormer; Fred Hofmann; Wally Schang; Infielders: Frank Baker; Joe Dugan; Mike McNally; Johnny Mitchell; Wally Pipp; Everett Scott; Aaron Ward	Outfielders: Chick Fewster; Norm McMillan; Bob Meusel; Elmer Miller; Babe Ruth; Camp Skinner; Elmer Smith; Whitey Witt	Manager: Miller Huggins; Coaches: Charley O'Leary; Frank Roth

== Player stats ==
=== Batting ===
==== Starters by position ====
Note: Pos = Position; G = Games played; AB = At bats; H = Hits; Avg. = Batting average; HR = Home runs; RBI = Runs batted in

Pos	Player	G	AB	H	Avg.	HR	RBI
C	Wally Schang	124	408	130	.319	1	53
1B	Wally Pipp	152	577	190	.329	9	90
2B	Aaron Ward	154	558	149	.267	7	68
3B	Frank Baker	69	234	65	.278	7	36
SS	Everett Scott	154	557	150	.269	3	45
OF	Bob Meusel	121	473	151	.319	16	84
OF	Babe Ruth	110	406	128	.315	35	99
OF	Whitey Witt	140	528	157	.297	4	40

==== Other batters ====
Note: G = Games played; AB = At bats; H = Hits; Avg. = Batting average; HR = Home runs; RBI = Runs batted in

Player	G	AB	H	Avg.	HR	RBI
Joe Dugan	60	252	72	.286	3	25
Elmer Miller	51	172	46	.267	3	18
Mike McNally	52	143	36	.252	0	18
Chick Fewster	44	132	32	.242	1	19
Fred Hofmann	37	91	27	.297	2	10
Norm McMillan	33	78	20	.256	0	11
Al DeVormer	24	59	12	.203	0	11
Camp Skinner	27	33	6	.182	0	2
Elmer Smith	21	27	5	.185	1	5
Johnny Mitchell	4	4	0	.000	0	0

=== Pitching ===
==== Starting pitchers ====
Note: G = Games pitched; IP = Innings pitched; W = Wins; L = Losses; ERA = Earned run average; SO = Strikeouts

Player	G	IP	W	L	ERA	SO
Bob Shawkey	39	299.2	20	12	2.91	130
Waite Hoyt	37	265.0	19	12	3.43	95
Joe Bush	39	255.1	26	7	3.31	92
Carl Mays	34	240.0	12	14	3.60	41

==== Other pitchers ====
Note: G = Games pitched; IP = Innings pitched; W = Wins; L = Losses; ERA = Earned run average; SO = Strikeouts

Player	G	IP	W	L	ERA	SO
Sam Jones	45	260.0	13	13	3.67	81

==== Relief pitchers ====
Note: G = Games pitched; W = Wins; L = Losses; SV = Saves; ERA = Earned run average; SO = Strikeouts

Player	G	W	L	SV	ERA	SO
George Murray	22	4	2	0	3.97	14
Lefty O'Doul	6	0	0	0	3.38	5
Clem Llewellyn	1	0	0	0	0.00	0

== World series ==
Game	Date	Visitor	Score	Home	Score	Record (NYY-NYG)	Attendance
1	October 4	New York Yankees	2	New York Giants	3	0–1–0	42,479
2	October 5	New York Giants	3	New York Yankees	3	0–1–1	37,020
3	October 6	New York Yankees	0	New York Giants	3	0–2–1	37,620
4	October 7 ‡	New York Giants	4	New York Yankees	3	0–3–1	36,242
5	October 8 ‡	New York Yankees	3	New York Giants	5	0–4–1	38,551
New York Giants win 4–0–1

== Farm system ==
Level	Team	League	Manager
AA	Jersey City Colts	International League	Ben Egan
