= Camp Skinner =

American baseball player (1897–1944)

- Skinner with the New York Yankees, c. 1922
- Outfielder / Pinch hitter
- Born: June 25, 1897; Douglasville, Georgia, U.S.
- Died: August 4, 1944 (aged 47); Douglasville, Georgia, U.S.
- Batted: Left Threw: Right

MLB debut
- May 2, 1922, for the New York Yankees

Last MLB appearance
- May 6, 1923, for the Boston Red Sox

MLB statistics
- Batting average: .196
- Home runs: 0
- Runs batted in: 3
- Stats at Baseball Reference

Teams
- New York Yankees (1922); Boston Red Sox (1923)

Elisha Harrison "Camp" Skinner (Note: Skinner's 1942 draft registration card lists his name as "Elisha Camp Skinner", which he signed as "E. C. Skinner".) (June 25, 1897 – August 4, 1944) was an American professional baseball outfielder. He was a reserve player and pinch hitter for the 1922 New York Yankees and 1923 Boston Red Sox of Major League Baseball (MLB). Listed at 5 feet 11 inches (1.80 m) and 165 pounds (75 kg), he batted left-handed and threw right-handed.

== Biography ==
Skinner's minor league career spanned 1921 to 1928, with gaps, as he did not play professionally in 1925 or 1927.

His major league career consisted of 27 games for the New York Yankees in 1922, and seven games for the Boston Red Sox in 1923. Prior to the 1923 season, he was traded by New York along with infielder Norm McMillan, pitcher George Murray, and cash to Boston in exchange for pitcher Herb Pennock. Overall, Skinner recorded a .196 batting average with no home runs and three RBIs. Most of his appearances were as a pinch hitter, as he only made six defensive appearances in the outfield (four for New York and two for Boston); (Note: Skinner was Boston's starting centerfield on Opening Day of 1923.) he was not charged with any errors.

Skinner was born in Douglasville, Georgia. He died at the age of 47 in his hometown and was buried there.
