= John Woods (baseball) =

American baseball player (1898–1946)

- Pitcher
- Born: January 18, 1898; Princeton, West Virginia
- Died: October 4, 1946 (aged 48); Norfolk, Virginia
- Batted: Right Threw: Right

MLB debut
- September 16, 1924, for the Boston Red Sox

Last MLB appearance
- September 16, 1924, for the Boston Red Sox

MLB statistics
- Earned run average: 0.00
- Innings pitched: 1
- Walks: 3
- Stats at Baseball Reference

Teams
- Boston Red Sox (1924)

John Fulton Woods (January 18, 1898 – October 4, 1946) was a professional baseball pitcher and police officer. He appeared in one game in Major League Baseball (MLB) for the Boston Red Sox during the 1924 season. Listed at 6 feet 0 inches (1.83 m), 175 lb (79 kg). During his career, Woods batted and threw right-handed.

Born in Princeton, West Virginia, Woods played college baseball at West Virginia University for the Mountaineers. After briefly attending law school, he was signed by the Red Sox and pitched one inning in his only MLB game, an 8–4 loss to the Chicago White Sox on September 16, 1924. He gave up no runs but walked three batters. Woods then played minor league baseball before joining the Norfolk Police Department in 1929. He became the chief of the department in 1939, serving in that capacity for the rest of his life until he was killed while responding to an auto accident in 1946.

== Early life ==
John Fulton Woods was born to Judge John Hugh Gordon Woods and Margaret Peck Woods on January 18, 1898, in Princeton, West Virginia. He and his twin brother, Carl, had three older siblings and one younger sister. Raised near the East River, he went to the Knob Street School for eight years and graduated from the East River District High School. In 1970, his widow told the Cleveland Plain Dealer that Woods starred in baseball, basketball, and track and field while in high school.

== College ==
After completing high school, Woods worked as a timekeeper for the Virginian Railway while living in Princeton in 1918, then served briefly in the United States Army through a collaboration with Washington and Lee University. Woods enrolled at West Virginia University in 1920, playing college baseball for the Mountaineers from his freshman year through the 1923 season. His father wanted him to study law, and he began law school but stopped in 1924 in order to pursue a professional baseball career by attending spring training with the Boston Red Sox.

According to Russo, Woods spent most of 1924 pitching for Charleston. The city did not have a minor league baseball team at this time, so the team was likely a semipro team. The Red Sox purchased his contract that September.

== Boston Red Sox ==
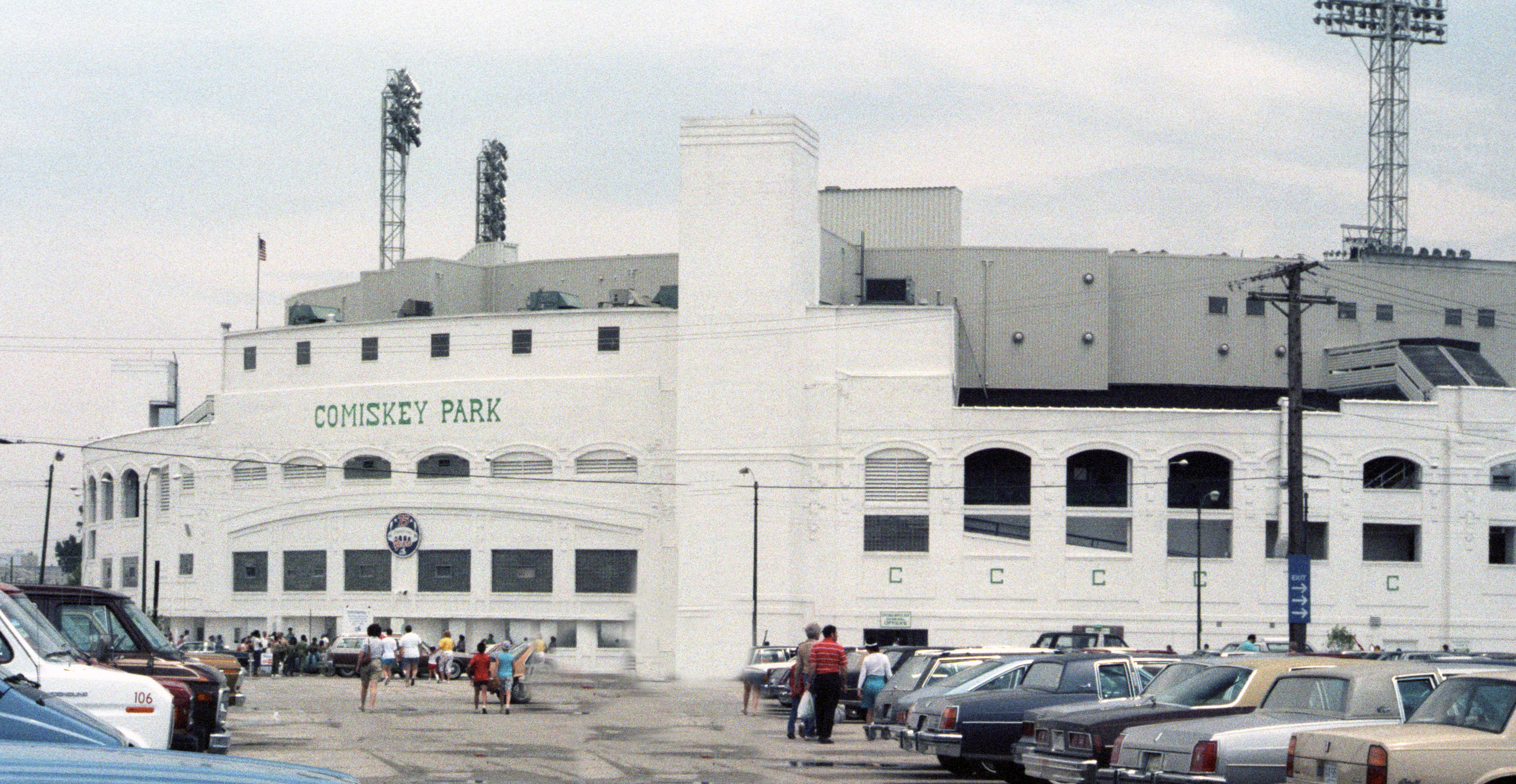
Comiskey Park was the site of Woods's only MLB appearance on September 16, 1924.

Woods's only Major League Baseball (MLB) game came on September 16, 1924, when the Red Sox played the Chicago White Sox at Comiskey Park. It was late in the regular season, and both teams were over 20 games out of first place in the American League. With Boston trailing Chicago 8–4, the right-handed Woods relieved Red Ruffing to begin the eighth inning. He issued a walk to Frank Naleway, then got Buck Crouse to fly out to right fielder Ike Boone. Then, he issued another walk to Ted Blankenship before getting Johnny Mostil to pop out to third baseman Homer Ezzell in foul territory. He issued his third walk of the inning to Harry Hooper, loading the bases, before he induced Eddie Collins to fly out to center fielder Ira Flagstead to end the inning. The Red Sox failed to score in the ninth, losing 8–4. Though Woods allowed three base runners to reach in the game, he never allowed a run, giving him a lifetime earned run average of 0.00. Woods kept a baseball from the game as a souvenir; it was autographed by all of his teammates.

== Minor league career ==
After the 1924 season, the Spartanburg Spartans of the Class C South Atlantic League acquired Woods's contract, then sold it back to the Red Sox on March 20, 1925. Woods would not pitch in the major leagues for Boston again, spending most of 1925 with the Dover Dobbins of the Class D Eastern Shore League. Baseball-Reference.com credits him with 22 appearances for Dover, though the statistics are incomplete. According to baseball historian Frank Russo, Woods also played for the Binghamton Triplets of the Class B New York-Penn League in 1925. He played for the Easton Farmers of the Eastern Shore League in 1927. After tearing tendons and ligaments in his left shoulder while helping move a car out of a ditch, he retired.

== Norfolk Police Department ==
Following his retirement, Woods became a policeman in 1927 and joined the Norfolk Police Department (NPD) in Norfolk, Virginia, in 1929. Part of the reason he was hired was that the department desperately needed a pitcher for its baseball team. Woods progressed through the ranks of the department and attended the FBI National Academy. In 1939, he became the NPD's Chief of Police. He served as the president of the Virginia Association of Chiefs of Police in 1943. The second vice president of the International Chiefs of Police Association, he was in line to take over as the organization's president in 1947.

On October 4, 1946, Woods was responding to a car crash on Cottage Toll Road (now known as Tidewater Drive). When he arrived at the scene at 12:20 AM, he crashed into a parked tow truck. Suffering a broken neck and crushed right side of his chest, he died instantly. Only 48 years old, Woods was buried in Block 9, Lot 19, Space W of the Forest Lawn Cemetery in Norfolk on October 6.

== Personal life ==
Woods married Sarah Elizabeth Charlton, a North Carolina resident, on July 12, 1922. They lived with Sarah's sister, M. Kathleen Wickers, and her children in Norfolk. The Woodses had three children: John Jr., George, and Robert. According to his widow, Woods was "a very capable person, and a fine Christian gentleman". Though Woods was listed at 6 feet 0 inches (1.83 m), 175 pounds (79 kg) during his career, his widow said that he weighed just 150 pounds (68 kg) in later years.
