= Howie Shanks =

American baseball outfielder (1890–1941)

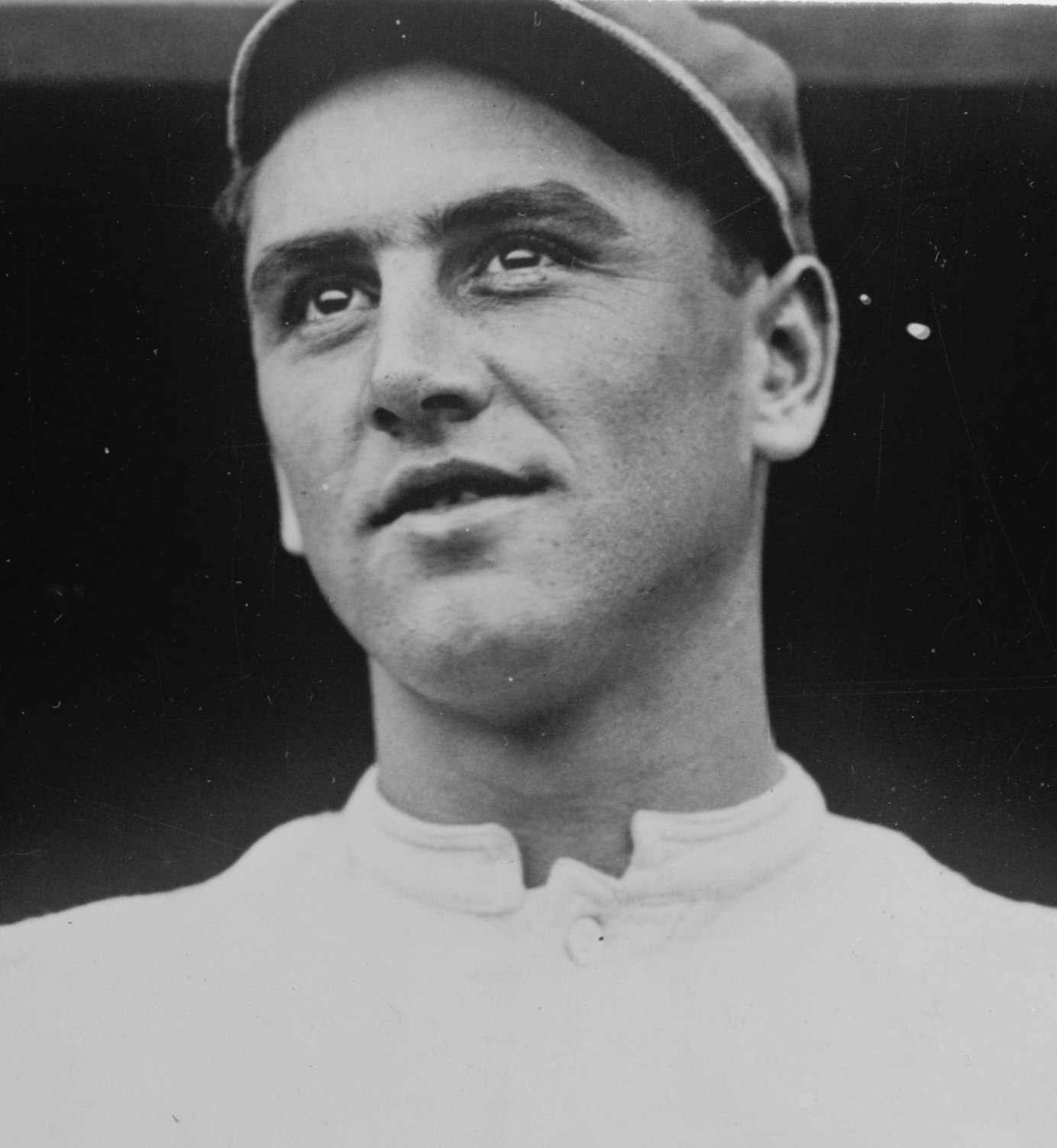
- Shanks in 1913
- Outfielder / Third baseman
- Born: July 21, 1890; Chicago, Illinois, U.S.
- Died: July 30, 1941 (aged 51); Monaca, Pennsylvania, U.S.
- Batted: Right Threw: Right

MLB debut
- May 9, 1912, for the Washington Senators

Last MLB appearance
- October 3, 1925, for the New York Yankees

MLB statistics
- Batting average: .253
- Home runs: 25
- Runs batted in: 620
- Stats at Baseball Reference

Teams
- Washington Senators (1912–1922); Boston Red Sox (1923–1924); New York Yankees (1925)

Howard Samuel Shanks (July 21, 1890 – July 30, 1941) was an American professional baseball outfielder. He played in Major League Baseball (MLB) from 1912 to 1925 for the Washington Senators, Boston Red Sox, and New York Yankees.

Shanks made his professional baseball debut in 1909. The Senators drafted him and he played for them from 1912 until they traded him to the Red Sox after the 1922 season. After two seasons with Boston, he was traded to the Yankees for his final MLB season. Regarded as one of the better defensive players in baseball, Shanks began his MLB career as an outfielder, but he also played as shortstop for Washington and as a utility infielder for Boston and New York. He was considered an "ordinary hitter". After his playing career, Shanks served as a coach for the Cleveland Indians and coached and managed in the minor leagues.

== Early life ==
Shanks was born on July 21, 1890, in Chicago, Illinois. His father, Samuel Shanks, immigrated to the United States from Ireland and lived in Youngstown, Ohio, before moving to Chicago. He was the second oldest of five children born to Samuel and Elizabeth (née Oatey) Shanks. After living in Chicago, the family moved to Monaca, Pennsylvania.

Shanks attended public schools in Monaca, including Monaca High School. In 1907, he began playing semi-professional baseball in Monaca. Shanks played for a semi-professional team in Rochester, Pennsylvania, in 1908 that was run by former Major League Baseball player Tom McCreery.

== Career ==
=== Early career ===
The East Liverpool Potters of the Class C Ohio–Pennsylvania League signed Shanks as a left fielder for the 1909 season on the recommendation of McCreery, and Shanks made his professional baseball debut that year, finishing the season with a .240 batting average. In 1910, he returned to East Liverpool, where he batted .223. After the 1910 season, East Liverpool sold the rights to Shanks and seven other players to the Youngstown Steelmen of the Ohio–Pennsylvania League for the 1911 season.

After the 1910 season, Shanks was diagnosed with tuberculosis and given "a couple of weeks to live." The Pittsburgh Pirates expressed interest in selecting him in the upcoming Rule 5 draft, but after seeing his medical report, they opted not to. Shanks returned to Monaca, where he recovered. He reported to Youngstown in 1911 and regained 40 pounds (18 kg) of lost weight before the end of the season. He batted .291 for Youngstown in the 1911 season. He also had a .990 fielding percentage and committed only three errors.

=== Major league career ===
Jimmy McAleer, manager of the Washington Senators of the American League, scouted Shanks during the 1911 season. On September 1, 1911, Washington selected Shanks from Youngstown in the Rule 5 draft. He competed for a role with the Senators in spring training in 1912 and made their roster as a backup outfielder. Shanks made his major league debut on May 9, 1912. After left fielder Danny Moeller injured his shoulder in a game on May 25, Shanks took over as the regular left fielder. When Moeller returned to the Senators, he played as a right fielder, with Tilly Walker becoming a bench player. Shanks played in 116 games in his first season with the Senators. He led all left fielders in the American League with a .962 fielding percentage. On May 31, 1913, Shanks sprained his right ankle sliding into home plate during a game, and was taken to Georgetown Hospital for treatment. The injury lingered for the remainder of the year. Shanks went to Bonesetter Reese after the season, who fixed Shanks's ankle by resetting a tendon.

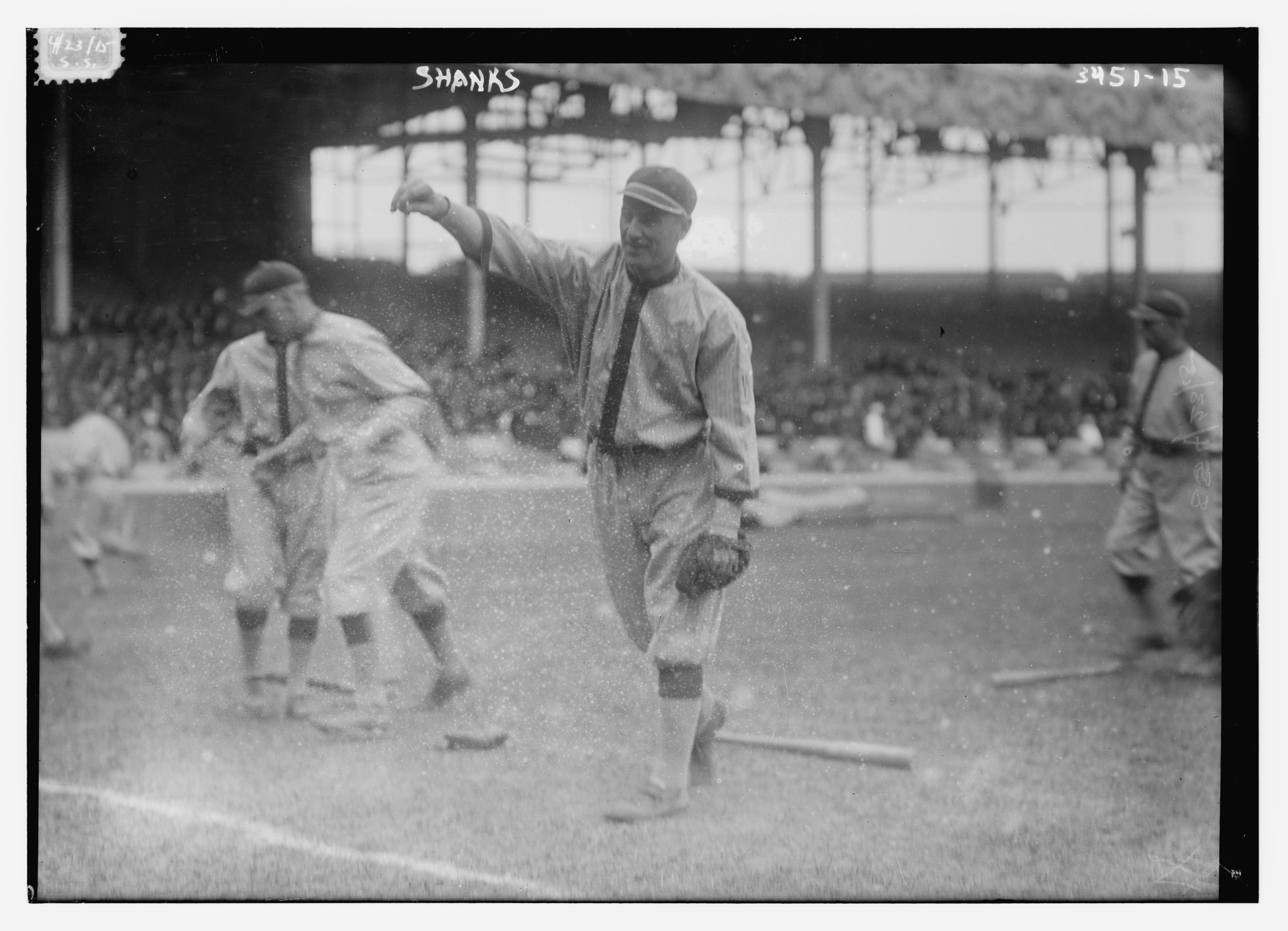
Shanks with the Washington Senators

By the 1914 season, Senators manager Clark Griffith said "Howard Shanks is, in my mind, the greatest fielding outfielder in baseball". He was also considered an "ordinary hitter". In 1915, Griffith brought in Henri Rondeau, Bill Brown, and Red Massey to compete with Shanks for playing time in an attempt to improve the team's offensive output. Rondeau made the Senators roster for the 1915 season and was given a trial in left field, but was sent to the minor leagues in May. By the end of the 1916 season, Griffith experimented with Shanks as a shortstop. Griffith made Shanks his regular shortstop in June 1917. He returned to playing as a left fielder in 1918, and Griffith had him play shortstop again in the 1919 season. In 1920, Shanks set a career high with a .264 average and tied a career high with four home runs. In 1921, Shanks hit .302 and led the American League in triples with 18. He also led all American League third baseman with a .960 fielding percentage.

On April 30, 1922, a line drive hit by Walker, Shanks' former teammate, now playing for the Philadelphia Athletics, broke Shanks' index finger. It was estimated that he would require three weeks to recover. He returned as the starting shortstop, but broke a bone in his left hand. In his time with Washington, Shanks played every outfield and infield position, but did not play as a pitcher or a catcher.

The Senators traded Shanks, Ed Goebel, and Val Picinich to the Boston Red Sox for Muddy Ruel and Allen Russell on February 10, 1923. Shanks opened the 1923 season as an outfielder for the Red Sox, but he played 37 games as a second baseman and 83 games as a third baseman in the 1923 season. In April 1924, the Red Sox dealt third baseman Norm McMillan and played Shanks at third base. He also played second base in the 1924 season.

On December 10, 1924, the Red Sox traded Shanks to the New York Yankees for Mike McNally. He succeeded McNally as the utility infielder for the Yankees during the 1925 season. After the 1925 season, the Yankees released Shanks.

=== Later career ===
Shanks signed a contract with the Louisville Colonels of the Class AA American Association for the 1926 season as their regular third baseman. He returned to Louisville for the 1927 season, but he struggled and was released in June when Louisville signed Ed Sicking. He signed with the Rochester Red Wings of the Class AA International League in July 1927.

Before the 1928 season, Shanks became a coach for the Cleveland Indians of the American League under manager Roger Peckinpaugh. He was charged with coaching the team's infielders and outfielders. Shanks coached for Cleveland until July 1932, when the team transitioned him into their scouting department. Shanks managed the Beaver Falls Browns of the Class D Pennsylvania State Association in 1938. In 1939, he became a coach and scout for the New Orleans Pelicans of the Class A1 Southern Association, which were managed by Peckinpaugh.

== Personal life ==
Shanks married Wilhelmina (née Wagner), a resident of Monaca, on February 24, 1915.

Shanks died of a coronary occlusion at his home in Monaca on July 30, 1941.

== See also ==
- List of Major League Baseball annual triples leaders
