= Walt Lynch =

American baseball player (1897–1976)

- Catcher
- Born: April 15, 1897; Buffalo, New York, U.S.
- Died: December 21, 1976 (aged 79); Daytona Beach, Florida, U.S.
- Batted: Right Threw: Right

MLB debut
- July 8, 1922, for the Boston Red Sox

Last MLB appearance
- July 17, 1922, for the Boston Red Sox

MLB statistics
- Batting average: .500
- Home runs: 0
- Runs scored: 0
- Stats at Baseball Reference

Teams
- Boston Red Sox (1922)

Walter Edward Lynch (April 15, 1897 – December 21, 1976), nicknamed "Jabber", was an American catcher in Major League Baseball who played briefly for the Boston Red Sox during the 1922 season. Listed at 6 ft 0 in (1.83 m), 176 lb., Lynch batted and threw right-handed. A native of Buffalo, New York, he studied at Niagara University and State University of New York College at Cortland.

In a three-game-career, Lynch was .500 hitter (1-for-2) and scored a run. As a catcher, he did not commit an error in two chances for a 1.000 fielding percentage.

Lynch died in Daytona Beach, Florida at age 79.

== See also ==
- 1922 Boston Red Sox season
