= Joe Connolly (1920s outfielder) =

American baseball player (1894–1960)

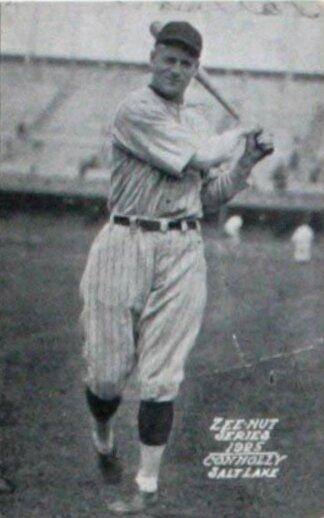
- Outfielder
- Born: June 27, 1894; San Francisco, California, U.S.
- Died: March 30, 1960 (aged 65); San Francisco, California, U.S.
- Batted: Right Threw: Right

MLB debut
- October 1, 1921, for the New York Giants

Last MLB appearance
- July 11, 1924, for the Boston Red Sox

MLB statistics
- Batting average: .268
- Home runs: 3
- Runs batted in: 32
- Stats at Baseball Reference

Teams
- New York Giants (1921); Cleveland Indians (1922–1923); Boston Red Sox (1924)

Joseph George Connolly [Coaster Joe] (June 27, 1894 – March 30, 1960) was an American backup outfielder in Major League Baseball who played for three clubs from 1921 through 1924. Listed at 6 ft 0 in (1.83 m), 170 lb (77 kg), Connolly batted and threw right-handed. He was born in San Francisco, California.

Connolly reached the majors in 1921 with the New York Giants, spending part of the year with them before moving to the Cleveland Indians in 1921. Before the 1924 season, he was sent by Cleveland along with Dan Boone, Steve O'Neill, and Bill Wambsganss to the Boston Red Sox in the same transaction that brought George Burns, Roxy Walters, and Chick Fewster to the Indians. His most productive season came in 1923 with Cleveland, when he hit .303 with three home runs and 25 RBI in 52 games, all career-highs.

In a four-season career, Connolly was a .268 hitter (45-for-168) with three home runs and 32 RBI in 80 games, including 32 runs, 12 doubles, two triples, two stolen bases, and a .349 on-base percentage.

Connolly died in his homeland of San Francisco, California at the age of 65.

== Sources ==
- Baseball Reference
- Retrosheet
