= Norfolk Police Department =

Police Department in Norfolk, Virginia

- Abbreviation: NPD

Agency overview
- Formed: 1797
- Employees: 885
- Annual budget: $63.6 million

Jurisdictional structure
- Operations jurisdiction: Norfolk, Virginia, USA
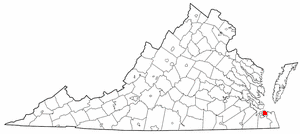
- Map of Norfolk Police Department's jurisdiction
- Area: 96.3 square miles (249 km^{2})
- Population: 242,803
- Governing body: City
- General nature: Local civilian police

Operational structure
- Headquarters: Norfolk, Virginia
- Police Officers: 380
- Civilians: 128
- Agency executive: Mark Talbot, Chief of Police

Facilities
- Stations: 2 Precincts

Website
- www.norfolk.gov/police/

The Norfolk Police Department (NPD) is the primary law enforcement agency servicing 242,803 people within 96.3 square miles (249 km^{2}) of jurisdiction within Norfolk, Virginia.

== Misconduct ==
As a matter of policy, the department does not tell the public what if any disciplinary actions it takes against its officers.

In early 2011, Detective Robert Glenn Ford was sentenced to more than twelve years in prison for taking bribes from criminals. Ford was the detective who questioned the Norfolk 4 who were unjustly imprisoned for twenty years for rape and murder. The men's lawyers said they had been intimidated into confessing by the police.

In January 2014, a woman was mauled by a Norfolk police dog, requiring forty-three stitches. The police chief admitted his officers used excessive force and the city settled for almost $200,000. Four policemen left the department as a result of this attack but were never charged.

On 7 May 2016, Officer Justin Benson was driving at more than seventy miles per hour on city streets when he struck a car, killing its driver. The officer was violating the department's policy on the maximum speed to be used when responding to a call. He was not charged.

In July 2016, the City agreed to pay one and a half million dollars to settle a lawsuit involving a drunk driver who was shot by a policeman. The City did not admit any legal responsibility in the settlement.

In September 2020, police falsified police report to be retaliatory for a past incident with an individual.

== Fallen officers ==
Since the establishment of the Norfolk Police Department, 40 officers have died in the line of duty.

Officer	Date of death	Details
Officer John McNerney	Thursday, September 22, 1904	Gunfire
Officer Rufus A. Hobbs	Friday, July 23, 1909	Animal-related
Officer Stonewall J. Taylor	Tuesday, November 13, 1917	Struck by vehicle
Officer Ashville T. Williamson	Thursday, October 31, 1918	Gunfire
Officer Harvey J. Babb	Tuesday, October 21, 1919	Motorcycle accident
Officer Harry J. Charlton	Tuesday, August 24, 1920	Assault
Officer William L. Sherrod	Thursday, September 9, 1920	Struck by streetcar
Officer Edward J. Vellines	Wednesday, November 5, 1924	Gunfire
Officer Daniel A. Weisbrod	Thursday, December 6, 1928	Gunfire
Officer Joseph E. Johnson	Monday, August 11, 1930	Motorcycle accident
Officer Allen E. Lindsay	Tuesday, August 21, 1934	Motorcycle accident
Sergeant Benjamin H. Butts	Tuesday, January 1, 1935	Gunfire
Officer Jefferson R. Holland	Tuesday, August 17, 1937	Motorcycle accident
Officer John Franklin Harmann	Tuesday, March 29, 1938	Gunfire
Officer Arthur Herbert Barrett	Saturday, April 9, 1938	Heart attack
Officer Michael Aloisio	Tuesday, May 23, 1939	Motorcycle accident
Officer Frank A. Davis	Tuesday, July 13, 1943	Gunfire
Officer Robert F. Dunn	Tuesday, July 13, 1943	Gunfire
Chief of Police John Fulton Woods	Friday, October 4, 1946	Automobile accident
Detective George W. Perkins	Thursday, December 12, 1946	Automobile accident
Officer Daniel E. Hobbs	Sunday, April 27, 1952	Automobile accident
Officer Carlton J. Byrd	Monday, August 25, 1952	Motorcycle accident
Officer William Warren Lassiter	Thursday, May 1, 1958	Struck by vehicle
Officer Louis E. Spry	Saturday, July 26, 1958	Vehicle pursuit
Officer Robert C. Hill	Wednesday, December 9, 1959	Automobile accident
Officer Benjamin E. Myrick	Saturday, February 13, 1960	Motorcycle accident
Detective Robert Courtland Wash	Tuesday, May 16, 1961	Gunfire
Officer William Peterson	Saturday, March 17, 1962	Struck by vehicle
Sergeant Robert J. Bouchard	Friday, September 3, 1971	Gunfire
Officer Lewis Willard Hurst Jr.	Wednesday, May 24, 1972	Gunfire
Officer Stephen Samuel Douros	Saturday, June 21, 1980	Vehicular assault
Officer John C. Thomas III	Wednesday, April 4, 1984	Motorcycle accident
Officer Douglas Eric Drye	Saturday, April 14, 1984	Gunfire
Police Officer William Henry Burtt	Tuesday, February 3, 1998	Gunfire
Police Officer James B. Gilbert	Friday, September 28, 2001	Gunfire
Police Officer Sheila Herring	Thursday, January 16, 2003	Gunfire
Police Officer Stanley Cornell Reaves	Friday, October 28, 2005	Gunfire
Police Officer Seneca Bailey Darden	Sunday, May 21, 2006	Gunfire (accidental)
Police Officer Brian Jones	Friday, May 30, 2014	Gunfire
Detective Maurice "Mo" Joseph	Wednesday, October 9, 2024	9/11-related illness

== See also ==
- List of law enforcement agencies in Virginia
- Police ranks of the United States
