= George Murray (baseball) =

American baseball player (1898–1955)

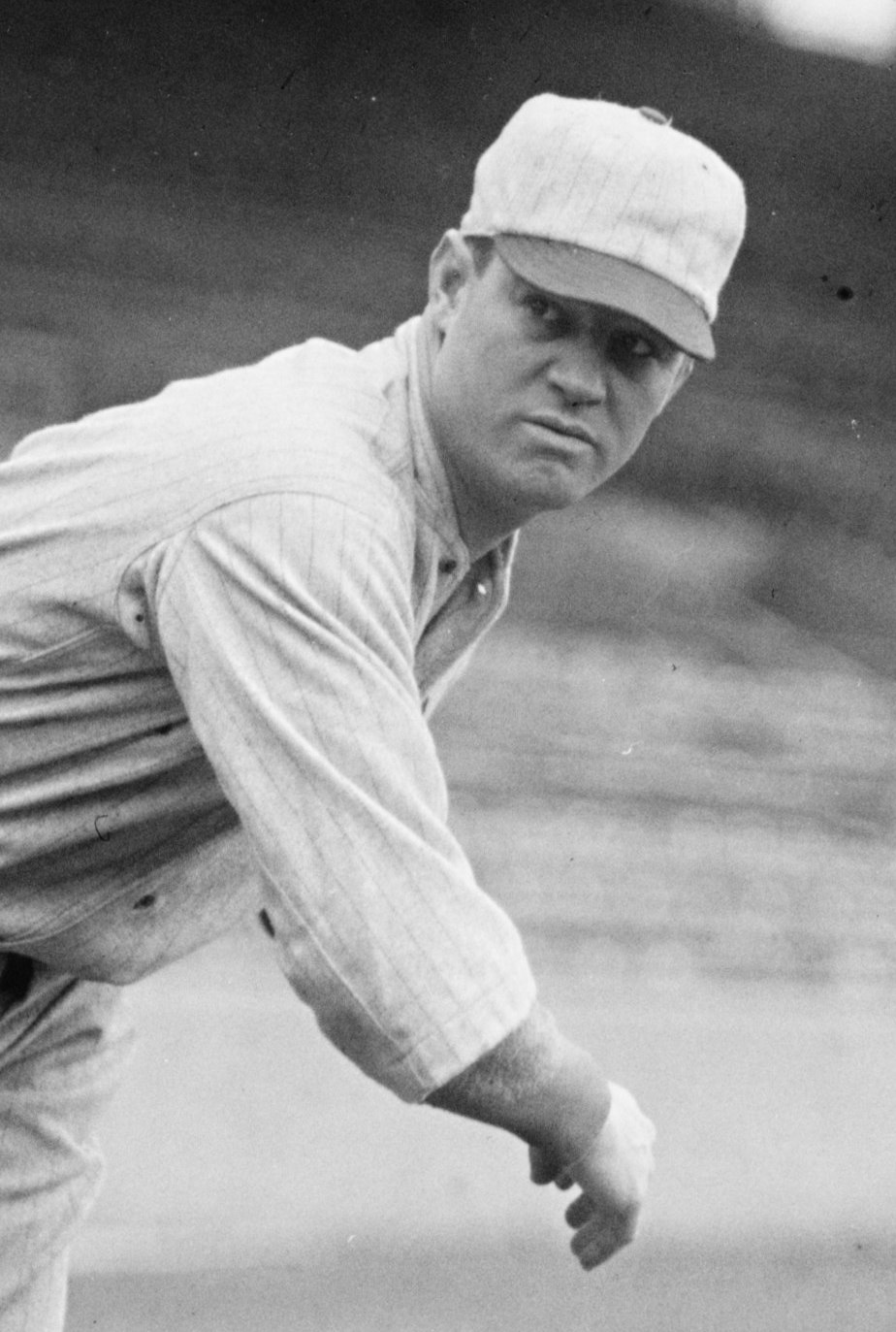
- Pitcher
- Born: September 23, 1898; Charlotte, North Carolina, U.S.
- Died: October 18, 1955 (aged 57); Brownsville, Tennessee, U.S.
- Batted: Right Threw: Right

MLB debut
- May 8, 1922, for the New York Yankees

Last MLB appearance
- May 1, 1933, for the Chicago White Sox

MLB statistics
- Win–loss record: 20–26
- Earned run average: 5.38
- Strikeouts: 114
- Stats at Baseball Reference

Teams
- New York Yankees (1922); Boston Red Sox (1923–1924); Washington Senators (1926–1927); Chicago White Sox (1933)

George King "Smiler" Murray (September 23, 1898 – October 18, 1955) was an American professional baseball pitcher for the New York Yankees, Boston Red Sox, Washington Senators, and Chicago White Sox of Major League Baseball.

== Biography ==
Murray was born on September 23, 1898, in Charlotte, North Carolina.

He attended North Carolina State College, where he played college baseball for the Wolfpack. In 1922, when he was 23, he broke into the Major Leagues on May 8 with the New York Yankees. He was mainly a relief pitcher, although started two games (out of 22 pitched in all). He was 4-2 with a 3.97 ERA.

The next two years Murray spent with the Boston Red Sox On January 30, 1923, Murray was traded to the Red Sox with Camp Skinner and Norm McMillan for star pitcher Herb Pennock and $50,000. In 1923, nearly half of the games he pitched in he started; however, he did worse than he did the year before, going 7-11 with a 4.91 earned run average. His seven wins that season were a career high, though.

In 1924, Murray went back to mainly relief pitching, and did even worse than he did the previous two years. He finished with a record of 2-9 and an earned run average of 6.72; he had one of the worst seasons out of all of the pitchers on the team.

That was the final year he played with the Red Sox. He did not play at all in 1925, and went with the Washington Senators in 1926. He was converted to a starting pitcher, didn't pitch as much, but still had the second best season of his career (behind his rookie season). He finished at 6-3 with a mediocre 5.63 ERA. In twelve games pitched he only gave up one home run, very good for a pitcher.

Murray pitched 1927 with the Senators as well. His amount of pitching time continued to decline, and it turned out that 1926 was his final season as a starting pitcher; 1927 was spent as a little-used relief man.

Murray did not pitch at all for the next five years. He made a comeback with the Chicago White Sox in 1933, but only pitched two games. His final game was played May 1 of that year, and at age 34, that marked the end of his Major League career.

Murray died on October 18, 1955, in Memphis, Tennessee. He was buried in Brownsville, Tennessee.
