= John Donahue (baseball) =

American baseball player (1894–1949)

- Right fielder
- Born: April 19, 1894; Roxbury, Massachusetts, U.S.
- Died: October 3, 1949 (aged 55); Boston, Massachusetts, U.S.
- Batted: Switch Threw: Right

MLB debut
- September 23, 1923, for the Boston Red Sox

Last MLB appearance
- October 7, 1923, for the Boston Red Sox
- Stats at Baseball Reference

Teams
- Boston Red Sox (1923)

John Frederick "Jiggs" Donahue (April 19, 1894 – October 3, 1949) was an American right fielder in Major League Baseball who played briefly for the Boston Red Sox during the 1923 season. Listed at 5 ft 8 in (1.73 m), 170 lb., Donahue was a switch-hitter and threw right-handed. He was born in Roxbury, Massachusetts.

In a 10-game career, Donahue was a .278 hitter (10-for-36) with four doubles, five runs, and one RBI. He did not hit a home run. As a fielder, he collected 21 outs with four assists and did not commit an error in 25 chances for a perfect 1.000 fielding percentage.

Donahue died in Boston, Massachusetts, at age 55.

== See also ==
- Boston Red Sox all-time roster

== Sources ==
- Baseball Reference
- Retrosheet
