= Chick Maynard =

American baseball player (1896–1957)

- Shortstop
- Born: November 2, 1896; Turners Falls, Massachusetts, U.S.
- Died: January 31, 1957 (aged 60); Bangor, Maine, U.S.
- Batted: Left Threw: Right

MLB debut
- June 27, 1922, for the Boston Red Sox

Last MLB appearance
- July 8, 1922, for the Boston Red Sox

MLB statistics
- Batting average: .125
- Home runs: 0
- Runs batted in: 0
- Stats at Baseball Reference

Teams
- Boston Red Sox (1922)

Leroy Evans "Chick" Maynard (November 2, 1896 – January 31, 1957) was an American shortstop in Major League Baseball who played briefly for the Boston Red Sox during the 1922 season. Listed at 5' 9", 150 lb., Maynard batted left-handed and threw right-handed. A native of Turners Falls, Massachusetts, he studied at Dartmouth College.

In a 12-game career, Maynard was a .125 hitter (3-for-24) with one run scored without any home runs. At shortstop, he committed five errors in 39 chances for a .872 fielding percentage.

Maynard died in Bangor, Maine at age 60.
