= Al DeVormer =

American baseball player (1891–1966)

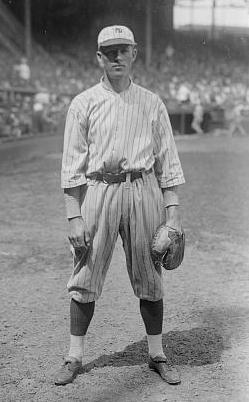
- DeVormer in 1921
- Catcher
- Born: August 19, 1891; Grand Rapids, Michigan, U.S.
- Died: August 29, 1966 (aged 75); Grand Rapids, Michigan, U.S.
- Batted: Right Threw: Right

MLB debut
- August 4, 1918, for the Chicago White Sox

Last MLB appearance
- September 30, 1927, for the New York Giants

MLB statistics
- Batting average: .258
- Home runs: 2
- Runs batted in: 57
- Stats at Baseball Reference

Teams
- Chicago White Sox (1918); New York Yankees (1921–1922); Boston Red Sox (1923); New York Giants (1927)

Albert E. DeVormer (August 19, 1891 – August 29, 1966) was an American professional baseball player. He played as a backup catcher in Major League Baseball for the Chicago White Sox, New York Yankees, Boston Red Sox, and New York Giants. DeVormer batted and threw right-handed. He was born in Grand Rapids, Michigan.

In a five-season career, he hit .258 with two home runs and 57 RBI.

DeVormer died at St. Mary's Hospital in Grand Rapids, Michigan on August 29, 1966.
