= Clem Llewellyn =

American baseball player (1895–1969)

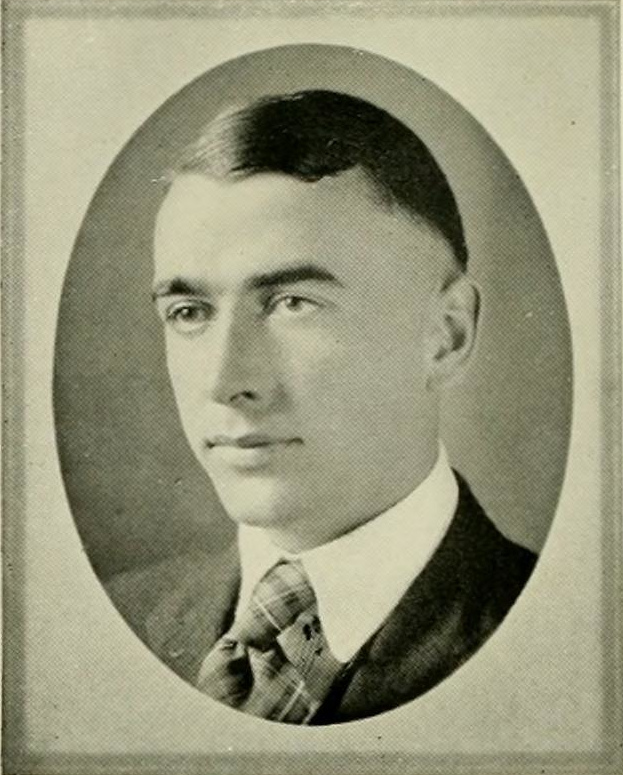
- Pitcher
- Born: August 1, 1895; Dobson, North Carolina, U.S.
- Died: November 27, 1969 (aged 74); Concord, North Carolina, U.S.
- Batted: Left Threw: Right

MLB debut
- June 18, 1922, for the New York Yankees

Last MLB appearance
- June 18, 1922, for the New York Yankees

MLB statistics
- Games: 1
- Earned run average: 0.00
- Strikeouts: 0
- Stats at Baseball Reference

Teams
- New York Yankees (1922)

Clement Manly "Lew" Llewellyn (August 1, 1895 – November 27, 1969) was an American baseball player, judge, and lawyer. He played a single Major League Baseball game with the New York Yankees in 1922. In 1 career game at the Cleveland Indians on June 18, he had a 0–0 record, with a 0.00 earned run average (ERA), pitching in only one inning. He did not get an At bat. The Yankees lost 9–2. He batted left and threw right-handed. The Yankees listed him as being 6 feet 3.5 inches tall and weighing 195 pounds (88 kg). He played baseball at the University of North Carolina at Chapel Hill where he was a member of Theta Chi fraternity.

Llewellyn was born in Dobson, North Carolina to James R. Llewellyn and Lula Waugh (Llewellyn). He married Ruth Spencer Pitchford. He practiced law and was a county judge. He died in Charlotte, North Carolina, and is buried in Oakwood Cemetery in Concord, North Carolina.

== Minor league career ==
Llewellynalso played for the Buffalo Bisons in 1922 with 6 wins and 6 losses and a 6.07 ERA. In 1923 he played for the Greenville Spinners, winning 9 and losing 5 with a 5.00 ERA, and also getting 44 hits in 147 At bats for a .299 batting average and the Atlanta Crackers in 3 games, losing 2, winning none. He returned to the Spinners in 1924 and 1925, in 1924 winning 15 and losing 10 with 4.10 ERA and getting 32 hits in 139 At Bats for a .230 BA, in 1925 winning 10 and losing 13 with 4.87 ERA and getting 14 hits in 88 At bats for a .159 BA.
