= Ira Flagstead =

American baseball player (1893–1940)

- Outfielder
- Born: September 22, 1893; Montague, Michigan, U.S.
- Died: March 13, 1940 (aged 46); Olympia, Washington, U.S.
- Batted: Right Threw: Right

MLB debut
- July 20, 1917, for the Detroit Tigers

Last MLB appearance
- July 29, 1930, for the Pittsburgh Pirates

MLB statistics
- Batting average: .290
- Home runs: 40
- Runs batted in: 456
- Stats at Baseball Reference

Teams
- Detroit Tigers (1917, 1919–1923); Boston Red Sox (1923–1929); Washington Senators (1929); Pittsburgh Pirates (1929–1930)

Career highlights and awards
- Boston Red Sox Hall of Fame

Ira James Flagstead (September 22, 1893 – March 13, 1940), sometimes known as "Pete", was an American baseball player. He played 15 years of professional baseball, principally as an outfielder, including 13 years in Major League Baseball with the Detroit Tigers (1917, 1919–1923), Boston Red Sox (1923–1929), Washington Senators (1929), and Pittsburgh Pirates (1929–1930). In 1,218 major league games, Flagstead compiled a .290 batting average with a .370 on-base percentage.

As a rookie with the Tigers in 1919, Flagstead compiled a .331 batting average, the fifth highest in the American League. However, the Tigers were loaded with outfielders during Flagstead's tenure with the team (including Ty Cobb, Harry Heilmann, Bobby Veach, and Heinie Manush), and Flagstead saw limited action as an outfielder and was converted into a shortstop for the 1921 season.

After being traded to the Boston Red Sox in 1923, Flagstead became one of the leading center fielders in the sport, with a combination of speed, a strong arm and a reliable glove. In 1923, he led all American League outfielders with 31 assists and eight double plays turned, and two years later he led the league's outfielders with a range factor of 3.15 – 0.88 points higher than the league average. He also set an American League record by starting three double plays as an outfielder in a single game, including two runners thrown out at home plate. He was among the leaders in the voting for the American League Most Valuable Player award for five consecutive years, ranking 15th in 1924, seventh in 1925, 23rd in 1926, 18th in 1927, and 14th in 1928.

== Early years ==
Flagstead was born in Montague, Michigan, in 1893. His father was an immigrant from Norway who worked as a sailor on the Great Lakes, and his mother was a German immigrant who worked as a servant for a private family Flagstead grew up across the street from a baseball field and was the catcher for the Montague baseball team at age 16.

As a young man, he moved to the Pacific Northwest, working for two years at a lumber mill in Littlerock, Washington, and then as a mill worker and steam fitter in Olympia, Washington. He played semi-pro baseball as the catcher for the Olympia Senators from 1913 to 1916. With arms and shoulders strengthened from his work as a steam fitter, Flagstead also competed briefly as a lightweight boxer while living in Washington.

== Professional baseball ==
=== Minor leagues ===
Flagstead did not begin playing professional baseball until age 24 when he signed with a team from Tacoma of the Northwest League. He played mostly in left field for Tacoma. By June 1917, he was batting .398 in his first season of professional baseball, had gained national press coverage, and was being hailed as "the batting sensation of the year".

On July 12, 1917, the Tacoma club sold Flagstead to the Detroit Tigers; the sale price was not disclosed but was said to be substantial. Flagstead made his major league debut eight days later on July 20, 1917. He appeared in four games for the Tigers and had no hits in four at bats. The Tigers sent Flagstead to the Chattanooga Lookouts of the Southern Association to gain additional experience. He compiled a .381 batting average in the closing weeks of the 1917 season. Flagstead's season ended early in July 1918 when he was called into the military service. His .381 batting average in 1918 led the Southern Association by 48 points. In October 1918, he was reported to be in training at Camp Custer, a military camp near Battle Creek, Michigan.

=== Detroit Tigers ===
In February 1919, with the war over, Flagstead returned a signed contract to play for the Tigers in 1918. He played in 97 games for the 1919 Tigers, 83 of those games as a right fielder following an injury to Detroit outfielder Chick Shorten. In his rookie season, he ranked among the American League leaders with a .331 batting average (fifth), a .415 on-base percentage (fifth), and a .481 slugging percentage (sixth). Late in the 1919 season, teammate Ty Cobb predicted that Flagstead was "destined to be one of the greatest hitters in the business."

In January 1920, Flagstead signed a contract to return to the Tigers. During the 1920 season, he appeared in 110 games, 77 of them as a right fielder. However, his batting average dropped almost 100 points from .331 to .235, and his slugging percentage dropped almost 150 points from .481 to .338.

In 1921, the Tigers were loaded with outfielders, including 1921 batting champion Harry Heilmann, Ty Cobb, and Bobby Veach. Detroit's new manager Ty Cobb decided to move Flagstead from right field to the infield, playing him in 55 games at shortstop and eight games at second base. Flagstead improved his batting average to .305, as the 1921 Tigers set American League records with 1,724 hits and a .316 team batting average. However, without pitching to match the level of the batters, the team compiled a 71–82 record and finished sixth in American League.

In 1922, the Tigers added shortstop Topper Rigney and outfielder Bob Fothergill, resulting in a further loss of playing time for Flagstead. Flagstead reported in January 1922 that he was considering quitting the game to join his brother in business in Washington. During the 1922 season, Flagstead compiled a .308 batting average with a .411 on-base percentage and .527 slugging percentage, but he appeared in only 44 games, 19 in center field and 11 in right field, and had only 91 at bats.

=== Boston Red Sox ===
Flagstead reported to the Tigers for spring training in March 1923. However, the Tigers roster of hard-hitting outfielders by then included Cobb, Heilmann, Veach, Heinie Manush and Bob Fothergill. Accordingly, Flagstead was placed on the market and appeared in only a portion of one game during the first week of the Tigers' 1923 season. Finally, on April 28, 1923, the Tigers traded Flagstead to the Boston Red Sox in exchange for Ed Goebel.

Flagstead appeared in 109 games for the 1923 Red Sox, 98 of them as the team's starting right fielder, and led all American League outfielders with 31 assists and eight double plays turned. He also compiled a .312 batting average and .380 on-base percentage and hit a career high eight home runs. After the 1923 season, Flagstead received national press coverage for an automobile trip with his wife and brother after picking up a new Buick sedan at the factory in Flint, Michigan, and driving on unpaved, muddy roads to their home in Olympia, Washington.

In 1924, Flagstead was moved to center field and started 143 games at the position. That year, he compiled a .307 batting average and .401 on-base percentage and ranked among the American League leaders with 106 runs scored (sixth), 77 bases on balls (eighth), and 11 times hit by a pitch (third). He finished 15th in the balloting for the 1924 American League Most Valuable Player award.

Flagstead proved to be an excellent center fielder, with speed, a strong arm, and a reliable glove. In 1925, he started 142 games in center field and led all American League outfielders with a range factor of 3.15 (0.88 points higher than the league average) and 24 assists and ranked third with 429 putouts. Flagstead was considered "a jinx" by Babe Ruth who estimated that Flagstead's play in center field cost him 10 home runs a year.

On April 19, 1926 (Patriots' Day in Boston), Flagstead set an American League record, and tied the major league record, by starting three double plays as an outfielder in a single game. He threw out two runners at the plate, began a four-player double play that was scored 8-5-4-2, and also made two catches described as "circus catches".

In 1927, he led all American League outfielders with a .986 fielding percentage. He also continues to rank among the all-time major league leaders with 25 double plays turned from center field (32nd), 95 assists from center field (42nd), and a 2.78 career range factor in center field (20th).

Though he never matched the batting numbers of his rookie season, Flagstead was a solid hitter for the Red Sox. He compiled batting averages and on-base percentages of .312/.380 in 1923, .307/.401 in 1924, .280/.356 in 1925, .299/.363 in 1926, .285/.374 in 1927 and .290/.366 in 1928. He also scored five runs in a game twice in his career with the Red Sox. He accomplished the feat on May 8, 1925, in a 15–7 victory over the Tigers, and again on August 29, 1927, in a 10–2 victory over the Indians. He was also known for his keen batting eye, totaling 335 bases of balls and only 168 strikeouts during his tenure with the Red Sox. To protect his batting eye, Flagstead did not play cards or read during the baseball season.

Flagstead was the most reliable player on the Red Sox teams from 1924 to 1928, and he was voted among the Top 25 in the AL MVP voting in each of those years: #15 in 1924; #7 in 1925; #23 in 1926; #18 in 1927; and #14 in 1928. One newspaper profile described Flagstead's value to the Red Sox as follows:

"Flaggy is more than a mere centerfielder. For several years, he has been flanked by rookie or crude gardeners at Fenway field and it has been Ira's voluntary task to try to instill in them some idea of how to play the outfield without wearing a mask and protector to avoid being hit by misjudged fly balls. In fact, Boston writers often referred to him as the 'Sox outfield'."

On July 21, 1928, the Red Sox held an "Ira Flagstead Day". In a ceremony before 17,000 fans at Fenway Park, the lieutenant governor of Massachusetts presented Flagstead with $1,000 in gold, a new automobile and other gifts for him and his wife.

=== Washington and Pittsburgh ===
On May 25, 1929, Flagstead was claimed off waivers by the Washington Senators. He appeared in only 18 games for Washington, compiling a career low .179 batting average in 39 at bats. He was granted an unconditional release by Washington and signed with the Pittsburgh Pirates on July 8, 1929. Pittsburgh manager Donie Bush played with Flagstead in Detroit. He appeared in 26 game for Pittsburgh in 1929 and 44 in 1930, including 36 games in 1930 as a starter at all three outfield positions. He compiled batting averages of .280 in 1929 and .250 in 1930. He appeared in his last major league game on July 29, 1930, and was given his unconditional release on August 9, 1930.

=== Minor leagues ===
In January 1931, Flagstead signed to play with the Portland Beavers of the Pacific Coast League. He played for Portland until being granted his unconditional release on July 21, 1931. After his release by Portland, he signed with the Seattle Indians, also of the PCL, where he concluded his professional baseball career in the last portion of the 1931 season.

== Family and later years ==
Flagstead was married to Reita Tibbetts, and they had a son, Ira, Flagstead, Jr. During his playing career, Flagstead lived in Olympia, Washington, where he fished for salmon and trout in the off-season and raised game roosters and English call ducks.

After his professional career ended, Flagstead continued to live in Olympia, where he managed a local baseball team that advanced to the Timber League championship playoffs for three consecutive years. After an illness of several months starting in August 1939, Flagstead died at his home in Olympia at age 46 in March 1940.

Flagstead has received numerous posthumous honors including the following:

- In 1991, he was inducted into the Muskegon Area Sports Hall of Fame;
- In 2003, he was inducted into the State of Washington Sports Hall of Fame;
- In 2007, he was selected by a group of Red Sox bloggers as one of the "Top 100 Red Sox" of all time, placing at No. 97. and
- On May 19, 2016, he was inducted into the Boston Red Sox Hall of Fame.
