= Carl Stimson =

American baseball player (1894–1936)

- Pitcher
- Born: July 18, 1894; Hamburg, Iowa
- Died: November 9, 1936 (aged 42); Omaha, Nebraska
- Batted: Both Threw: Right

MLB debut
- June 6, 1923, for the Boston Red Sox

Last MLB appearance
- July 7, 1923, for the Boston Red Sox

MLB statistics
- Win–loss record: 0–0
- Earned run average: 22.50
- Strikeouts: 1
- Stats at Baseball Reference

Teams
- Boston Red Sox (1923)

Carl Remus Stimson (July 18, 1894 – November 9, 1936) was a relief pitcher in Major League Baseball who played briefly for the Boston Red Sox during the 1923 season. Listed at 6 ft 5 in (1.96 m), 190 lb., Stimson was a switch-hitter and threw right-handed. He was born in Hamburg, Iowa.

Stimson posted a 22.50 earned run average in two relief appearances, including one strikeout, five walks, 12 hits allowed and 4.0 innings of work, without a decision or saves.

Stimson died at the age of 42 in Omaha, Nebraska.
