= Val Picinich =

American baseball player (1896–1942)

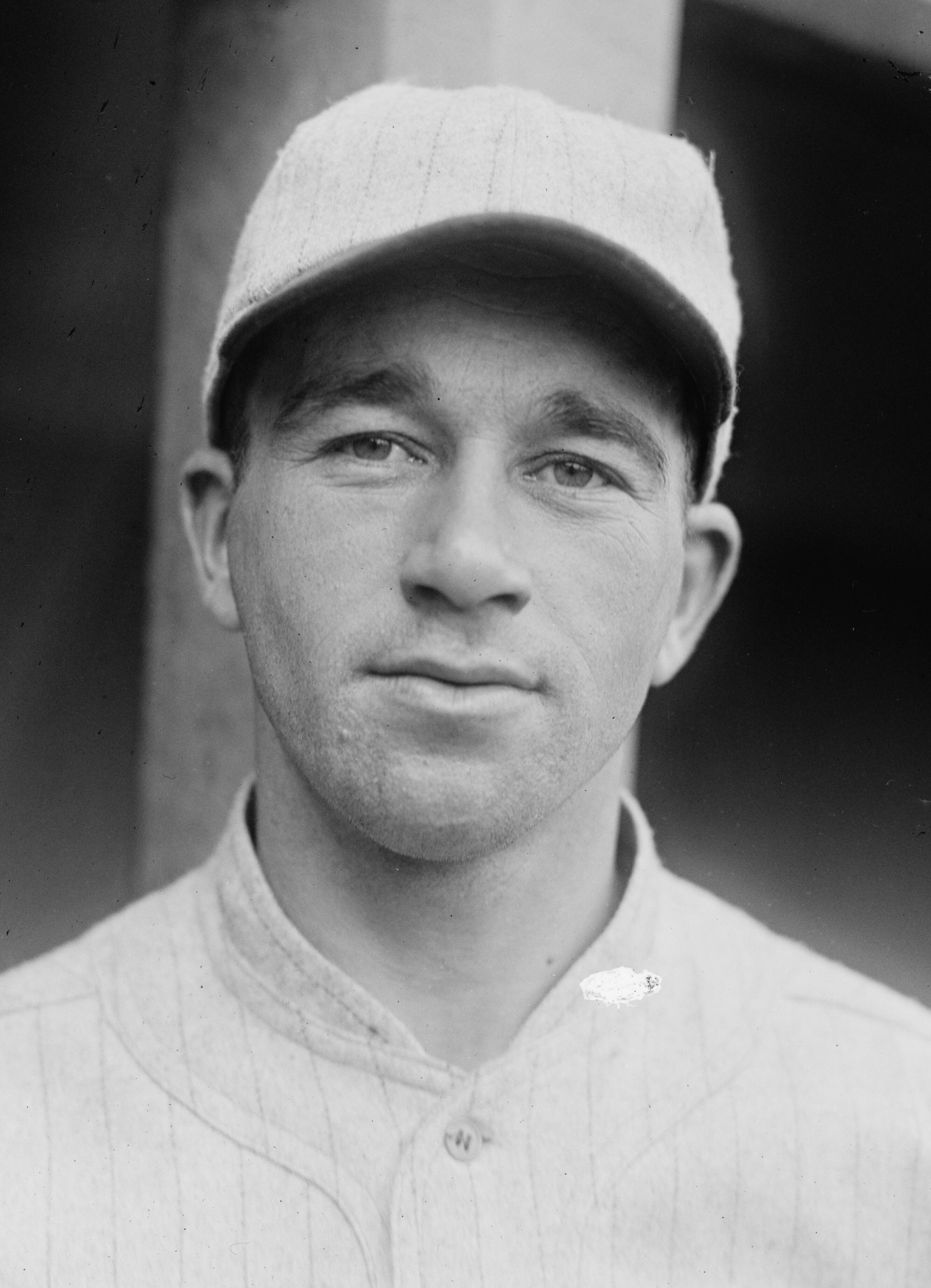
- Picinich, circa 1924
- Catcher
- Born: September 8, 1896; New York, New York, U.S.
- Died: December 5, 1942 (aged 46); Nobleboro, Maine, U.S.
- Batted: Right Threw: Right

MLB debut
- July 25, 1916, for the Philadelphia Athletics

Last MLB appearance
- August 28, 1933, for the Pittsburgh Pirates

MLB statistics
- Batting average: .258
- Home runs: 26
- Runs batted in: 298
- Stats at Baseball Reference

Teams
- Philadelphia Athletics (1916–1917); Washington Senators (1918–1922); Boston Red Sox (1923–1925); Cincinnati Reds (1926–1928); Brooklyn Robins / Dodgers (1929–1933); Pittsburgh Pirates (1933)

Valentine John Picinich (September 8, 1896 – December 5, 1942) was an American professional baseball catcher. He played in Major League Baseball (MLB) from 1916 to 1933 for the Philadelphia Athletics, Washington Senators, Boston Red Sox, Cincinnati Reds, Brooklyn Robins / Dodgers, and Pittsburgh Pirates.

In 18 seasons, Picinich played in 1,037 games and hit .258 with 26 home runs and 298 RBI. He caught three no-hitters in his first eight major league seasons and he was the personal catcher for Walter Johnson for four seasons. Picinich was a minor league manager after his playing career ended. He died of pneumonia in 1942.

== Career ==
After spending one year at Princeton University, Picinich left school to pursue a professional baseball career with the Philadelphia Athletics. He debuted with the Athletics in 1916 and played with the team through 1917. From 1918 to 1922, Picinich played for the Washington Senators and was the personal catcher for Walter Johnson; he only sat out two of Johnson's games during that time. Picinich caught three no-hitters, all early in his career (one by Bullet Joe Bush, 1916; one by Johnson, 1920; and one by Howard Ehmke, 1923).

Picinich may have had his best season for the Cincinnati Reds in 1928. He played in a major league career-high 96 games that year and hit .302. The next year, Picinich appeared in 93 games, but his batting average dropped to .260. He seemed to struggle defensively that year, leading the league in two dubious categories: passed balls (9) and stolen bases allowed (75).

After 1929, Picinich never played in more than 41 major league games in any season. He last appeared in the major leagues with the Pittsburgh Pirates in 1933. In 1934, he wrote to Ford Frick to say that he was creating a baseball school in Brooklyn. Picinich then spent four seasons managing in the minor leagues.

== Later life ==
After leaving baseball, Picinich bought a chicken farm in Maine. He then worked as the personnel service and morale director for Bath Iron Works. In 1942, Picinich contracted bronchial influenza and was diagnosed with pneumonia a few days later. He died in Nobleboro, Maine, at the age of 46. He was survived by his parents, a wife, and a daughter, Barbara.

His daughter was married to Roland L. Bragg, U.S. Army paratrooper and the namesake of Fort Bragg.
