= Ike Boone =

American baseball player (1897–1958)

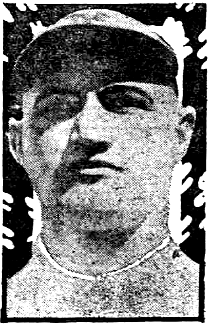
- Outfielder
- Born: February 17, 1897; Samantha, Alabama, U.S.
- Died: August 1, 1958 (aged 61); Northport, Alabama, U.S.
- Batted: Left Threw: Right

MLB debut
- April 22, 1922, for the New York Giants

Last MLB appearance
- May 8, 1932, for the Brooklyn Dodgers

MLB statistics
- Batting average: .321
- Home runs: 26
- Runs batted in: 194
- Stats at Baseball Reference

Teams
- New York Giants (1922); Boston Red Sox (1923–1925); Chicago White Sox (1927); Brooklyn Robins/Dodgers (1930–1932)

Isaac Morgan "Ike" Boone (February 17, 1897 – August 1, 1958) was an American professional baseball player. He played eight seasons as a right fielder in Major League Baseball (MLB) between 1922 and 1932 for the New York Giants, Boston Red Sox, Chicago White Sox, and Brooklyn Robins/Dodgers. His older brother, Dan, also played in the major leagues from 1919 to 1923.

Boone reached the majors in 1922 with the New York Giants, spending one year with them before moving to the Boston Red Sox (1923–25), Chicago White Sox (1927) and Brooklyn Dodgers (1930–32). His most productive season came in 1924 with Boston, when he posted career-highs in batting average (.337), home runs (13), RBI (98), hits (157), runs (79), doubles (34), triples (5), and games played (133). In 1924 and 1925 he was considered for the MVP Award. In an eight-season major league career, Boone was a .321 hitter with 26 home runs and 194 RBI in 356 games.

Boone was one of the greatest minor league hitters of all time. His .370 minor league career batting average set a record which still stands, and in 1929 he set a professional baseball record, collecting 553 total bases while hitting .407 with 55 home runs and 218 RBI in 198 games played with the Mission Reds of the Pacific Coast League. The same season, Boone and his brother Danny (46) combined for 101 home runs. He is the last player to hit .400 or better in the Texas League, with a .402 average in 1923.

As player/manager of the Toronto Maple Leafs, Boone led the team to the International League championship in 1934 and also was named the league MVP, winning the batting title with a .372 batting average. Boone managed the Leafs through the 1936 season.

He was later inducted into the International League Hall of Fame and the Pacific Coast League Hall of Fame.

Boone died in Northport, Alabama, at the age of 61 after suffering from a heart attack while mowing his lawn. He had been planning to fly to Toronto to appear in an old timer's game.
