= Ed Goebel =

American baseball player (1898-1959)

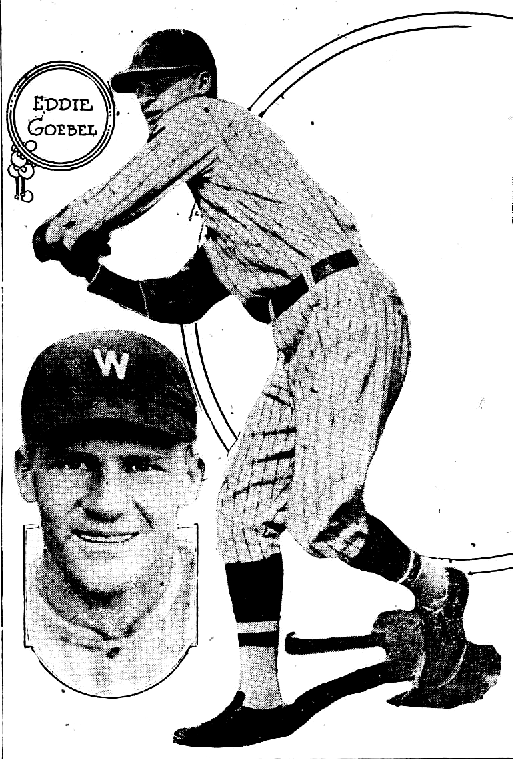
- Pinch hitter/Right fielder
- Born: September 1, 1898; Brooklyn, New York
- Died: August 12, 1959 (aged 60); Brooklyn, New York
- Batted: Right Threw: Right

MLB debut
- May 3, 1922, for the Washington Senators

Last MLB appearance
- September 18, 1922, for the Washington Senators

MLB statistics
- Batting average: .271
- Home runs: 1
- Runs batted in: 3
- Stats at Baseball Reference

Teams
- Washington Senators (1922)

Wilbur Edwin "Ed" Goebel (September 1, 1898 – August 12, 1959) was a Major League Baseball player. He played for the Washington Senators in 1922. He was used as mostly as a pinch hitter, and also as a right fielder.
