= Homer Ezzell =

American baseball player (1896–1976)

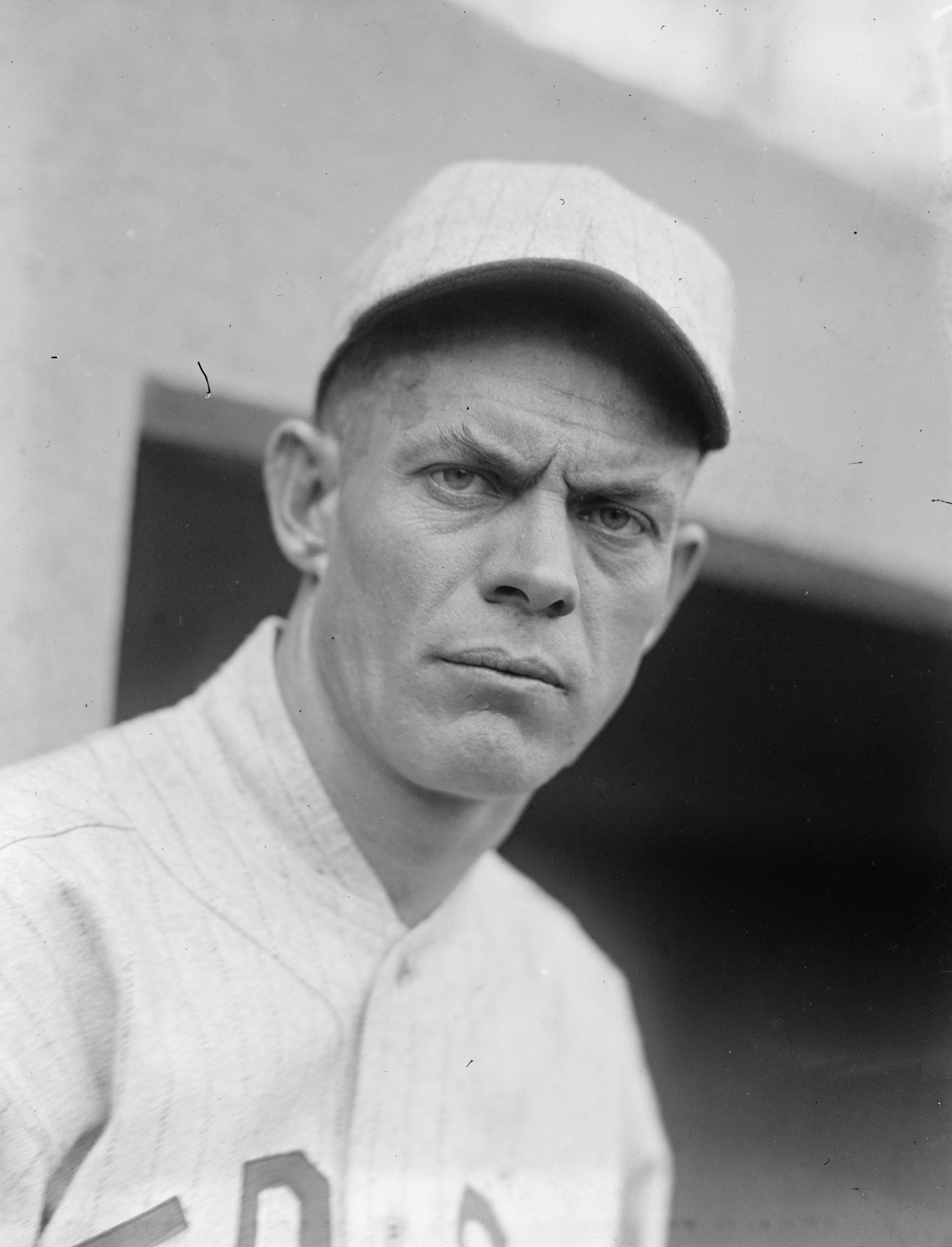
- Third baseman
- Born: February 28, 1896; Victoria, Texas
- Died: August 3, 1976 (aged 80); San Antonio, Texas
- Batted: Right Threw: Right

MLB debut
- April 22, 1923, for the St. Louis Browns

Last MLB appearance
- October 2, 1925, for the Boston Red Sox

MLB statistics
- Batting average: .264
- Home runs: 0
- Runs batted in: 61
- Stats at Baseball Reference

Teams
- St. Louis Browns (1923); Boston Red Sox (1924–1925)

Homer Estell Ezzell (February 28, 1896 – August 3, 1976) was a third baseman in Major League Baseball who played from 1923 through 1925 for the St. Louis Browns (1923) and Boston Red Sox (1924–25). Listed at 5 ft 10 in (1.78 m), 158 lb., Ezzell batted and threw right-handed. He was born in Victoria, Texas.

In a three-season career, Ezzell was a .264 hitter (196-for-236) with 61 RBI in 236 games played, including 106 runs, 20 doubles, eight triples and 25 stolen bases. He did not hit a home run.

Ezzell died in San Antonio, Texas at age 80.
