= Johnny Mitchell (baseball) =

American baseball player (1894–1965)

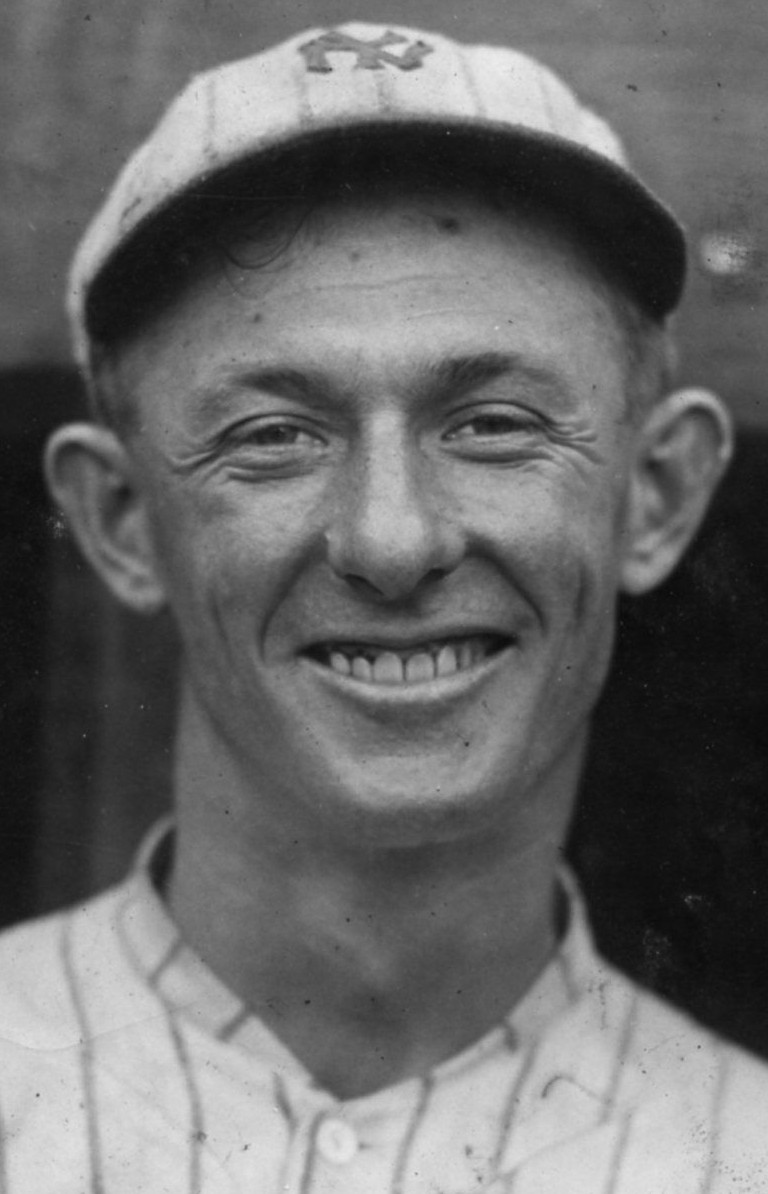
- Shortstop
- Born: August 9, 1894; Detroit, Michigan, U.S.
- Died: November 4, 1965 (aged 71); Birmingham, Michigan, U.S.
- Batted: Switch Threw: Right

MLB debut
- May 21, 1921, for the New York Yankees

Last MLB appearance
- September 23, 1925, for the Brooklyn Robins

MLB statistics
- Batting average: .245
- Home runs: 2
- Runs batted in: 64
- Stats at Baseball Reference

Teams
- New York Yankees (1921–1922); Boston Red Sox (1922–1923); Brooklyn Robins (1924–1925)

John Franklin Mitchell (August 9, 1894 – November 4, 1965) was an American professional baseball shortstop. He played five seasons in Major League Baseball (MLB) between 1921 and 1925 for the New York Yankees, Boston Red Sox, Brooklyn Robins.

In 329 games over five seasons, Mitchell posted a .245 batting average (288-for-1175) with 152 runs, 2 home runs, 64 RBIs and 119 bases on balls. Defensively, he recorded a .953 fielding percentage.

Mitchell married his wife Clara née Pasternacki and they had a daughter, Beatrice. Six years after he retired, Mitchell died of a heart attack at a nursing home on November 4, 1965.
