= Les Howe =

American baseball player (1895–1976)

- Pitcher
- Born: August 24, 1895; Brooklyn, New York, U.S.
- Died: July 26, 1976 (aged 80); Woodmere, New York, U.S.
- Batted: Right Threw: Right

MLB debut
- August 18, 1923, for the Boston Red Sox

Last MLB appearance
- June 6, 1924, for the Boston Red Sox

MLB statistics
- Win–loss record: 2–0
- Earned run average: 3.38
- Strikeouts: 10
- Stats at Baseball Reference

Teams
- Boston Red Sox (1923–1924)

Lester Curtis Howe (August 24, 1895 – July 16, 1976) was an American pitcher in Major League Baseball who played from 1923 through 1924 for the Boston Red Sox. Listed at 5 ft 11.5 in (1.82 m), 170 lb., Howe batted and threw right-handed. He was born in Brooklyn, New York.

In a two-season career, Howe posted a 2–0 record with a 3.38 ERA in 16 appearances, including two starts, 10 strikeouts and nine walks in 37⅓ innings of work.

Howe died in Woodmere, New York at age 80 of natural causes. A World War I veteran, he was buried at Long Island National Cemetery.
