= Pinky Pittenger =

American baseball player (1899–1977)

- Utility player
- Born: February 24, 1899; Hudson, Michigan, U.S.
- Died: November 4, 1977 (aged 78); Fort Lauderdale, Florida, U.S.
- Batted: Right Threw: Right

MLB debut
- April 15, 1921, for the Boston Red Sox

Last MLB appearance
- September 22, 1929, for the Cincinnati Reds

MLB statistics
- Batting average: .263
- Home runs: 1
- Runs batted in: 83
- Stats at Baseball Reference

Teams
- Boston Red Sox (1921–1923); Chicago Cubs (1925); Cincinnati Reds (1927–1929)

Clarke Alonzo "Pinky" Pittenger (February 24, 1899 – November 4, 1977) was a reserve infielder/outfielder in Major League Baseball, playing mainly at shortstop for three different teams between the 1921 and 1929 seasons. Listed at 5 ft 10 in (1.78 m), 160 lb., Pittenger batted and threw right-handed. He was born in Hudson, Michigan.

A valuable utility man, Pittenger was 22 years old when he entered the majors in 1921 with the Boston Red Sox, playing for them through 1923 before joining the Chicago Cubs (1925) and Cincinnati Reds (1927–1929). His most productive season came with the 1929 Reds, when he posted career-numbers in games (77), runs (31) and RBI (27), while hitting a .295 batting average, also a career-high.

In a seven-season career, Pittenger was a .263 hitter (252-for-373) with one home run and 83 RBI in 373 games, including 118 runs, 32 doubles, three triples and 27 stolen bases. He made 284 infield appearances at shortstop (136), third base (77) and second (71), and also played 21 games at left field (18), center (4) and right (4) .

Pittenger died at the age of 78 in Fort Lauderdale, Florida.
