= Bill Piercy =

American baseball player (1896–1951)

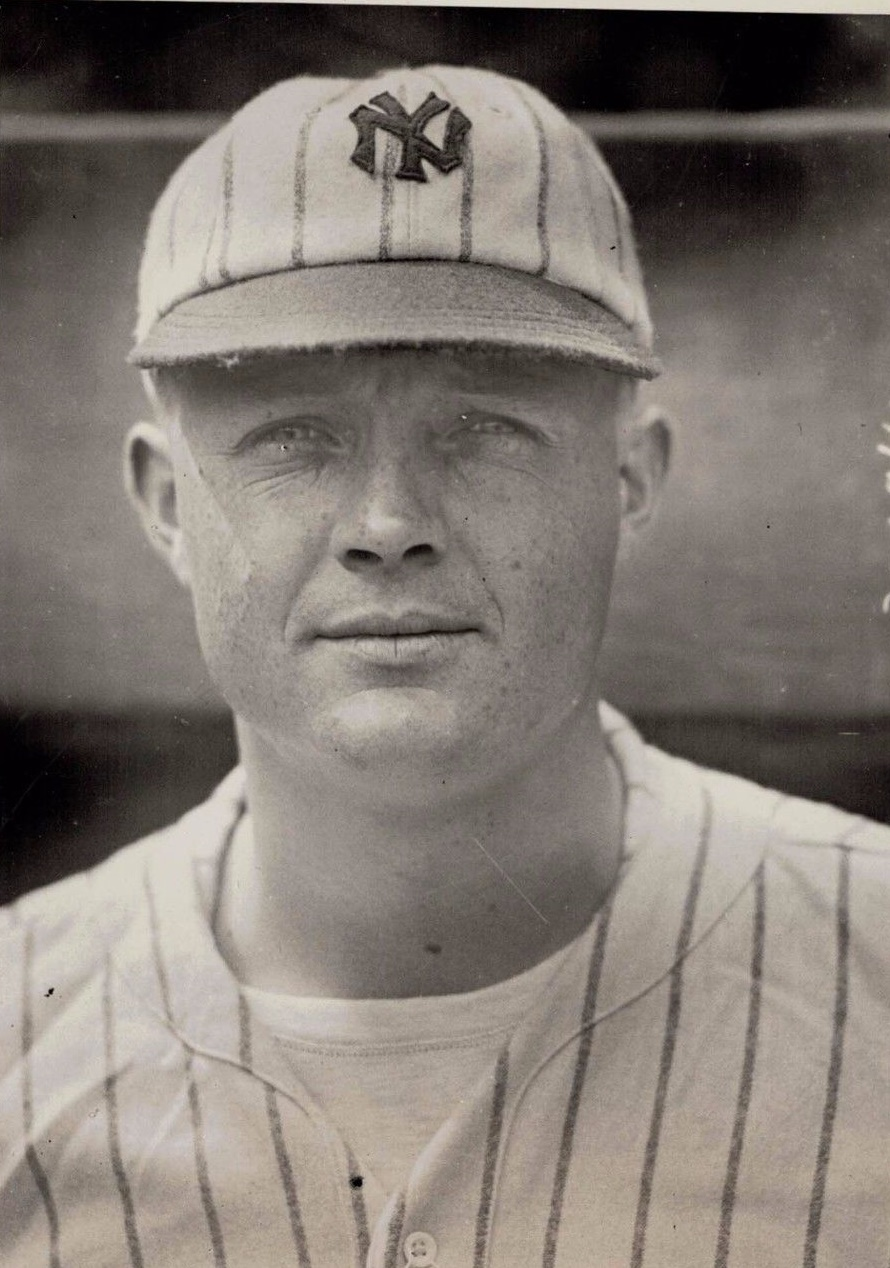
- Pitcher
- Born: May 2, 1896; El Monte, California, U.S.
- Died: August 28, 1951 (aged 55); Long Beach, California, U.S.
- Batted: Right Threw: Right

MLB debut
- October 3, 1917, for the New York Yankees

Last MLB appearance
- September 6, 1926, for the Chicago Cubs

MLB statistics
- Win–loss record: 27-43
- Earned run average: 4.26
- Strikeouts: 165
- Stats at Baseball Reference

Teams
- New York Yankees (1917, 1921); Boston Red Sox (1922–1924); Chicago Cubs (1926)

William Benton Piercy (May 2, 1896 – August 28, 1951), born in El Monte, California, was an American pitcher for the New York Yankees (1917 and 1921), Boston Red Sox (1922–24) and Chicago Cubs (1926).

Piercy helped the Yankees win the 1921 American League pennant.

In 6 seasons, he had a 27–43 win–loss record, 116 games (70 started), 28 complete games, 2 shutouts, 30 games finished, 610 2/3 innings pitched, 676 hits allowed, 362 runs allowed, 289 earned runs allowed, 16 home runs allowed, 268 walks allowed, 165 strikeouts, 43 hit batsmen, 21 wild pitches, 2180 batters faced, 1 balk, and a 4.26 ERA.

He died at a hospital in Long Beach, California after suffering a heart attack, at the age of 55.
