= Alex Ferguson (baseball) =

American baseball player (1897–1976)

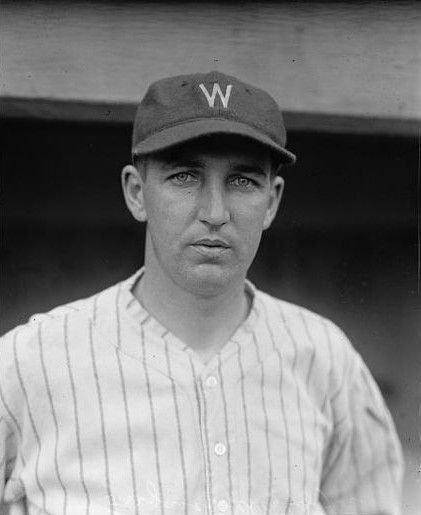
- Pitcher
- Born: February 16, 1897; Montclair, New Jersey, U.S.
- Died: April 26, 1976 (aged 79); Sepulveda, California, U.S.
- Batted: Right Threw: Right

MLB debut
- August 16, 1918, for the New York Yankees

Last MLB appearance
- May 18, 1929, for the Brooklyn Robins

MLB statistics
- Win–loss record: 61–85
- Earned run average: 4.89
- Strikeouts: 397
- Stats at Baseball Reference

Teams
- New York Yankees (1918, 1921); Boston Red Sox (1922–1925); New York Yankees (1925); Washington Senators (1925–1926); Philadelphia Phillies (1927–1929); Brooklyn Robins (1929)

James Alexander Ferguson (February 16, 1897 – April 26, 1976) was an American pitcher in Major League Baseball who played for five different teams between 1918 and 1929. Listed at 6 ft 0 in (1.83 m), 180 lb., Ferguson batted and threw right-handed.

Born in Montclair, New Jersey, Ferguson was raised in nearby Bloomfield. Ferguson died at West Los Angeles VA Medical Center on April 26, 1976 after suffering an illness for two months. His funeral was held in Camarillo, California on April 30.

== Professional career ==
Ferguson was one of the first forkball specialists in major league history. He entered the majors in 1918 with the New York Yankees, playing for them two years (1918, 1921) before joining the Boston Red Sox (1922–1925), Washington Senators (1925–1926), again the Yankees (1925), and with the Philadelphia Phillies (1927–1929) and Brooklyn Robins (1925). He enjoyed his highest win season in 1924 with the seventh-place Red Sox, when he won 14 games while losing an American League-high 17. In 1925 he divided his playing time with Boston, New York and Washington, ending with a 5–1 mark and a 3.25 ERA in seven games for the Senators AL champion team. During the World Series, he pitched well against the Pittsburgh Pirates, going 1–1 with a 3.21 ERA in two starts.

In a 10-season career, Ferguson posted a 61–85 record with 397 strikeouts and a 4.89 ERA in 257 appearances, including 166 starts, 62 complete games, two shutouts, 10 saves, and 1241 2/3 innings of work.

In 1926 Ferguson set a major league record for the highest ERA during a regular season by a pitcher who started a postseason game the same year. Ferguson collected a combined 6.18 ERA while pitching with the Red Sox, Yankees and Senators. The mark was broken in 2006 by Óliver Pérez of the New York Mets, who posted a 6.55 ERA during the regular season before starting Game 4 of the NL Championship Series.

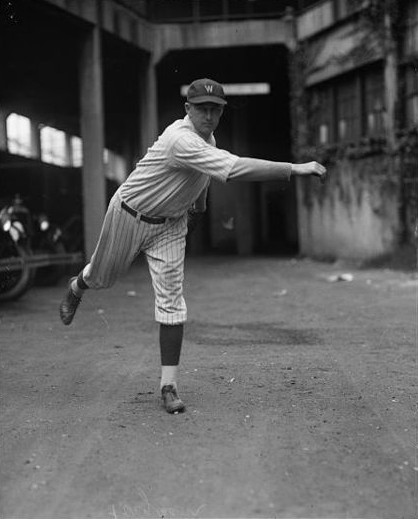
Alex Ferguson, 1925
