= Curt Fullerton =

American baseball player (1898–1975)

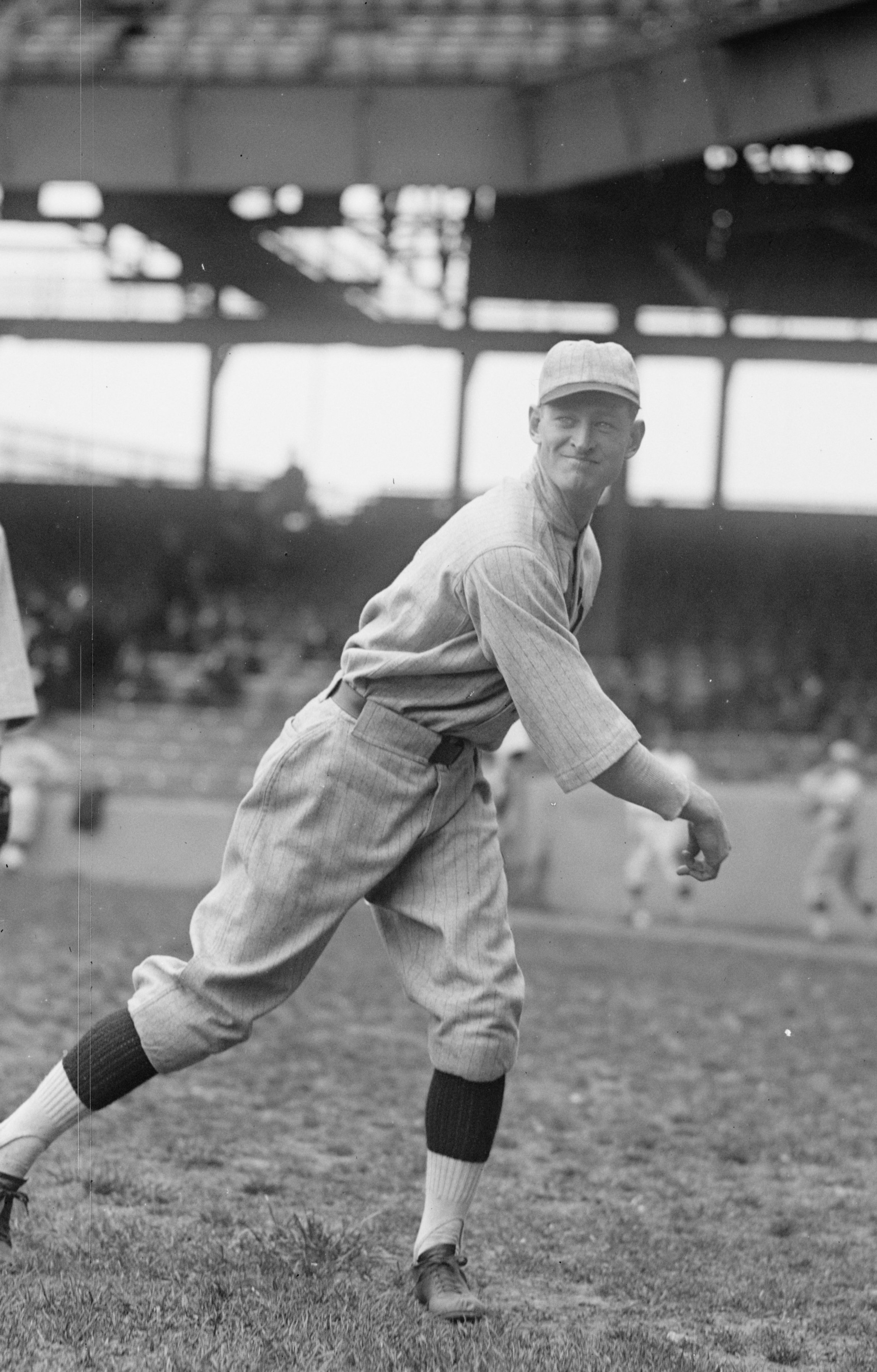
- Pitcher
- Born: September 13, 1898; Ellsworth, Maine, U.S.
- Died: January 9, 1975 (aged 76); Winthrop, Massachusetts, U.S.
- Batted: Left Threw: Right

MLB debut
- April 14, 1921, for the Boston Red Sox

Last MLB appearance
- September 23, 1933, for the Boston Red Sox

MLB statistics
- Win–loss record: 10–37
- Earned run average: 5.11
- Strikeouts: 104
- Stats at Baseball Reference

Teams
- Boston Red Sox (1921–1925, 1933)

Curtis Hooper Fullerton (September 13, 1898 – January 9, 1975) was an American professional baseball pitcher with the Boston Red Sox of Major League Baseball. Fullerton played for the Red Sox from 1921 to 1925 and again in 1933. He was signed by the New York Yankees in 1925, but never played for the club. Instead, he was released to the Hollywood Stars in the Pacific Coast League where he played from 1926 to 1928. Following that, he played two seasons with the Portland Beavers from 1929 to 1930. He was traded to the Jersey City Skeeters in 1931. In 1933, he was re-signed to the Red Sox only to be released again in 1934 to Kansas City. He pitched in the Texas League for the Dallas Steers from 1936 to 1937. In 1938, he pitched his last stint in organized baseball for the Monroe White Sox in the Class C Cotton States League.

In the six seasons of his Major League career, Fullerton posted a 10–37 record with 104 strikeouts and a 5.11 ERA in 115 appearances, including 43 starts, 18 complete games, three saves, 45 games finished, 211 walks, and 423.0 innings of work.

Listed at 6 ft 0 in (1.83 m), 162 lb., Fullerton batted left-handed and threw right-handed. He was born in Ellsworth, Maine on September 13, 1898, to Charles L. Fullerton, a sea captain, and Marian Letitia (Hooper) Fullerton. In October 1934 he married Mary Mildred McGilvery. After his career in baseball, Fullerton returned to the Boston Naval Shipyard, where he worked as an electrician and welder. Fullerton died in Winthrop, Massachusetts at age 76.

He is the great-uncle of game designer Tracy Fullerton and comic book and video game writer Charlotte Fullerton.

== Sources ==
- Career statistics from Baseball Reference · Retrosheet · Baseball Almanac
- Retrosheet
- Society for American Baseball Research
