= Chick Fewster =

American baseball player (1896–1945)

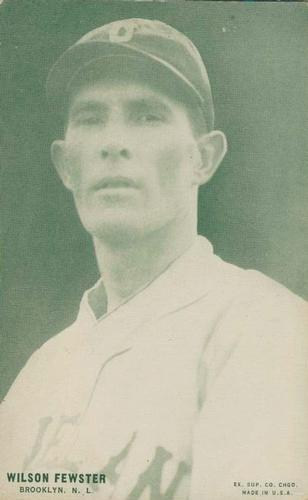
- Second baseman
- Born: November 10, 1896; Baltimore, Maryland, U.S.
- Died: April 16, 1945 (aged 48); Baltimore, Maryland, U.S.
- Batted: Right Threw: Right

MLB debut
- September 19, 1917, for the New York Yankees

Last MLB appearance
- May 1, 1927, for the Brooklyn Robins

MLB statistics
- Batting average: .258
- Home runs: 6
- Runs batted in: 167
- Stats at Baseball Reference

Teams
- New York Yankees (1917–1922); Boston Red Sox (1922–1923); Cleveland Indians (1924–1925); Brooklyn Robins (1926–1927)

Wilson Lloyd "Chick" Fewster (November 10, 1896 – April 16, 1945) was an American professional baseball second baseman. He played eleven seasons in Major League Baseball (MLB) between 1917 and 1927 for the New York Yankees, Boston Red Sox, Cleveland Indians, and Brooklyn Robins. In his career, Fewster hit six home runs and drove in 167 RBI. He died of coronary occlusion at age 49.

Fewster played for the Yankees in the 1921 World Series. He was the first player to bat at Yankee Stadium.

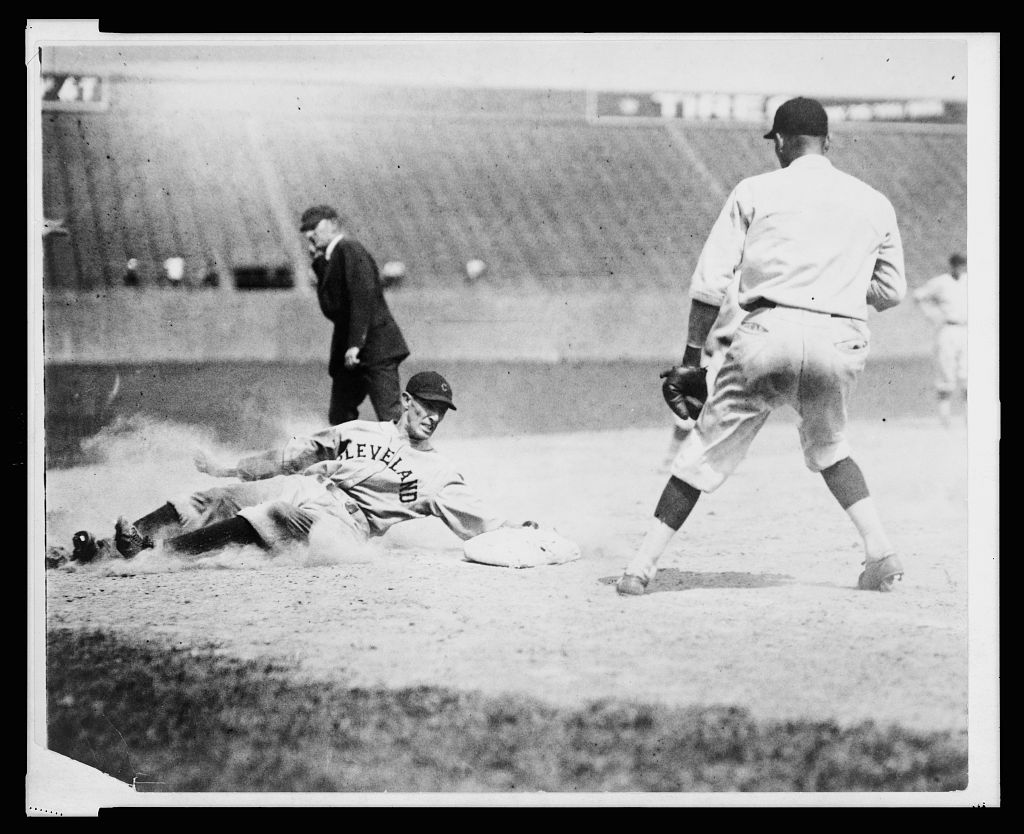
Fewster slides into third base during a game in 1924, as a member of the Cleveland Indians

On March 25, 1920 while at bat in the top of the first inning during an exhibition game against the Brooklyn Robins, Fewster was struck in the temple by a pitch from Robins right-hander Jeff Pfeffer knocking him unconscious for approximately ten minutes. Fewster suffered a fractured skull and concussion which was complicated by internal hemorrhaging. He temporarily lost his ability to speak and underwent an operation at Johns Hopkins Hospital on March 31 to remove skull fragments and a blood clot, and to have a silver plate placed in to his skull. He rejoined the team on July 5 of that year and appeared in 21 games.

Fewster is perhaps best known for being a part of one of the most famous flubs in baseball history, the "three men on third" incident that occurred during the 1926 season. Fewster was on first and future Hall of Famer Dazzy Vance was on second when teammate Babe Herman hit a long ball and began racing around the bases. As Herman rounded second, the third base coach yelled at him to go back, since Fewster had not yet passed third. Vance, having rounded third, misunderstood and thought the instructions to reverse course were for him. Thus, Vance returned to third at the same time Fewster arrived there. Meanwhile, Herman ignored the instruction to go back and also arrived at third at the same time. The third baseman tagged out Herman and Fewster; Vance was declared safe by rule.
