= Norm McMillan =

American baseball player (1895–1969)

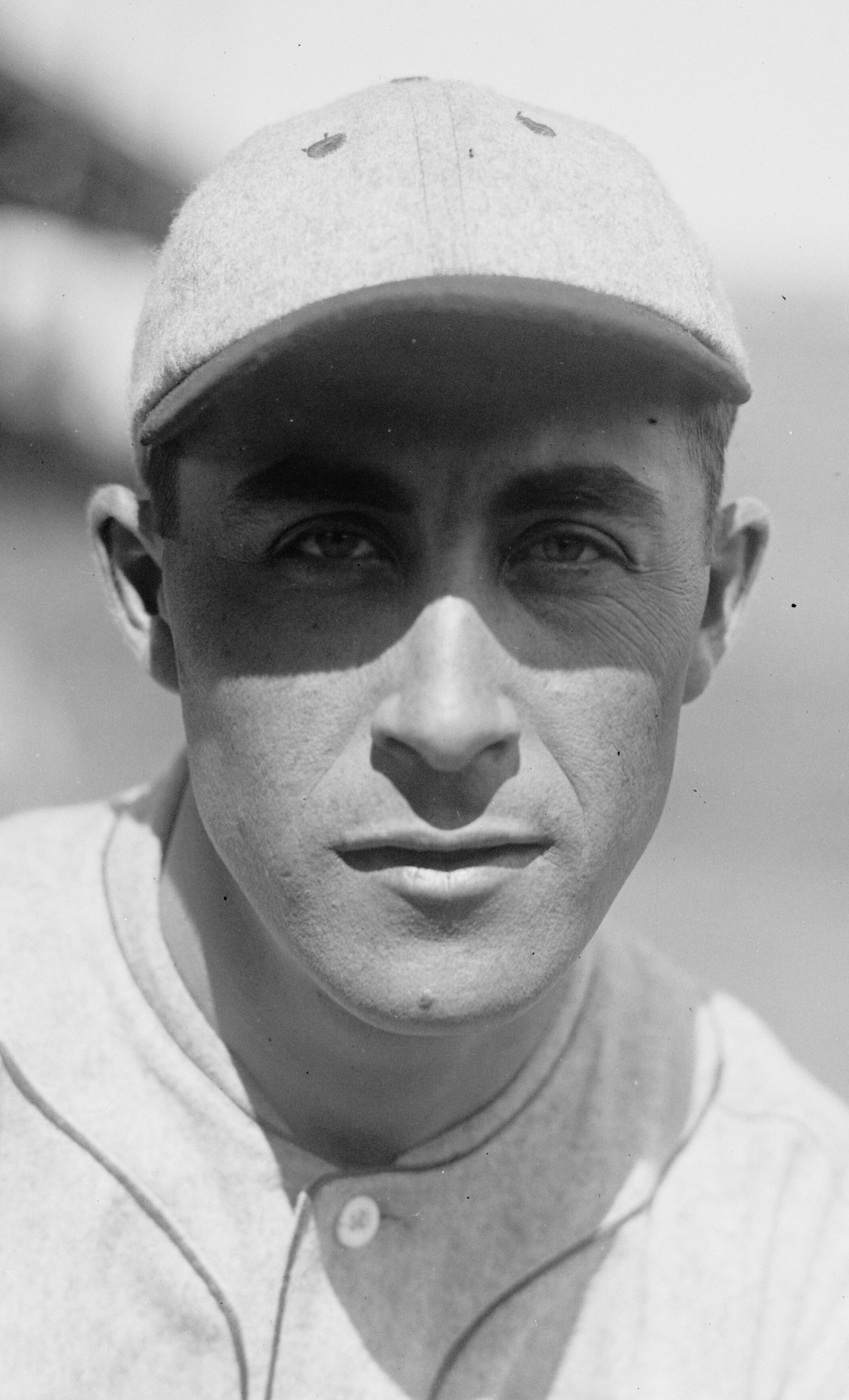
- McMillan, circa 1924
- Infielder
- Born: October 5, 1895; Latta, South Carolina, U.S.
- Died: September 28, 1969 (aged 73); Marion, South Carolina, U.S.
- Batted: Right Threw: Right

MLB debut
- April 12, 1922, for the New York Yankees

Last MLB appearance
- October 6, 1929, for the Chicago Cubs

MLB statistics
- Batting average: .260
- Home runs: 6
- Runs batted in: 147
- Stats at Baseball Reference

Teams
- New York Yankees (1922); Boston Red Sox (1923); St. Louis Browns (1924); Chicago Cubs (1928–1929)

Norman Alexis "Bub" McMillan (October 5, 1895 – September 28, 1969) was an American Major League Baseball shortstop, third baseman and second baseman with the New York Yankees, Boston Red Sox, St. Louis Browns and the Chicago Cubs between 1922 and 1929. He batted and threw right-handed.

McMillan was born in Latta, South Carolina and died in Marion, South Carolina at age 73.
