= 1922 Major League Baseball season =

1922 MLB season
- League: American League (AL); National League (NL)
- Sport: Baseball
- Duration: Regular season: April 12 – October 1, 1922; World Series: October 4–8, 1922
- Games: 154
- Teams: 16 (8 per league)

Regular Season
- Season MVP: AL: George Sisler (SLB)
- AL champions: New York Yankees
- AL runners-up: St. Louis Browns
- NL champions: New York Giants
- NL runners-up: Cincinnati Reds

World Series
- Champions: New York Giants
- Runners-up: New York Yankees

MLB seasons
- ← 1921 1923 →

Locations of teams for the 1915–1922 American League seasons
American League
Locations of teams for the 1920–1931 National League seasons
National League

The 1922 major league baseball season began on April 12, 1922. The regular season ended on October 1, with the New York Giants and New York Yankees were the regular season champions of the National League and American League, respectively. In a rematch of the previous season, the postseason began with Game 1 of the 19th World Series on October 4 and ended with Game 5 on October 8. In the second consecutive iteration of the Subway Series, the Giants defeated the Yankees, four games to zero (with one tie), capturing their third championship in franchise history, and the fourth team to win back-to-back World Series. This was the second World Series between the two teams.

This was the first of eight seasons that "League Awards", a precursor to the Major League Baseball Most Valuable Player Award (introduced in 1931), were issued. Only an American League award was given in 1922.

== Schedule ==
The 1922 schedule consisted of 154 games for all teams in the American League and National League, each of which had eight teams. Each team was scheduled to play 22 games against the other seven teams of their respective league. This continued the format put in place since the 1904 season (except for 1919) and would be used until 1961 in the American League and 1962 in the National League.

Opening Day, April 13, featured all sixteen teams, for the first time since 1917. The final day of the regular season was on October 1. The World Series took place between October 4 and October 8.

== Rule change ==
In June, a 1911 rule regarding barnstorming by World Series players was upheld by the National League, though the American League amended the rule to say that no barnstorming could go on past October 31.

== Teams ==
League	Team	City	Ballpark	Capacity	Manager
American League	Boston Red Sox	Boston, Massachusetts	Fenway Park	27,000	Hugh Duffy
American League	Chicago White Sox	Chicago, Illinois	Comiskey Park	28,000	Kid Gleason
American League	Cleveland Indians	Cleveland, Ohio	Dunn Field	21,414	Tris Speaker
American League	Detroit Tigers	Detroit, Michigan	Navin Field	23,000	Ty Cobb
American League	New York Yankees	New York, New York	Polo Grounds	38,000	Miller Huggins
American League	Philadelphia Athletics	Philadelphia, Pennsylvania	Shibe Park	23,000	Connie Mack
American League	St. Louis Browns	St. Louis, Missouri	Sportsman's Park	24,040	Lee Fohl
American League	Washington Senators	Washington, D.C.	National Park	27,000	Clyde Milan
National League	Boston Braves	Boston, Massachusetts	Braves Field	40,000	Fred Mitchell
National League	Brooklyn Robins	New York, New York	Ebbets Field	30,000	Wilbert Robinson
National League	Chicago Cubs	Chicago, Illinois	Cubs Park	15,000	Bill Killefer
National League	Cincinnati Reds	Cincinnati, Ohio	Redland Field	20,696	Pat Moran
National League	New York Giants	New York, New York	Polo Grounds	38,000	John McGraw
National League	Philadelphia Phillies	Philadelphia, Pennsylvania	National League Park	18,000	Kaiser Wilhelm
National League	Pittsburgh Pirates	Pittsburgh, Pennsylvania	Forbes Field	25,000	George Gibson
National League	Pittsburgh Pirates	Pittsburgh, Pennsylvania	Forbes Field	25,000	Bill McKechnie
National League	St. Louis Cardinals	St. Louis, Missouri	Sportsman's Park	24,040	Branch Rickey

== Standings ==
=== American League ===
American League
Team	W	L	Pct.	GB	Home	Road
New York Yankees	94	60	.610	—	50‍–‍27	44‍–‍33
St. Louis Browns	93	61	.604	1	54‍–‍23	39‍–‍38
Detroit Tigers	79	75	.513	15	43‍–‍34	36‍–‍41
Cleveland Indians	78	76	.506	16	44‍–‍35	34‍–‍41
Chicago White Sox	77	77	.500	17	43‍–‍34	34‍–‍43
Washington Senators	69	85	.448	25	40‍–‍39	29‍–‍46
Philadelphia Athletics	65	89	.422	29	38‍–‍39	27‍–‍50
Boston Red Sox	61	93	.396	33	31‍–‍42	30‍–‍51

=== National League ===
National League
Team	W	L	Pct.	GB	Home	Road
New York Giants	93	61	.604	—	51‍–‍27	42‍–‍34
Cincinnati Reds	86	68	.558	7	48‍–‍29	38‍–‍39
St. Louis Cardinals	85	69	.552	8	42‍–‍35	43‍–‍34
Pittsburgh Pirates	85	69	.552	8	45‍–‍33	40‍–‍36
Chicago Cubs	80	74	.519	13	39‍–‍37	41‍–‍37
Brooklyn Robins	76	78	.494	17	44‍–‍34	32‍–‍44
Philadelphia Phillies	57	96	.373	35½	35‍–‍41	22‍–‍55
Boston Braves	53	100	.346	39½	32‍–‍43	21‍–‍57

=== Tie games ===
7 tie games (2 in AL, 5 in NL), which are not factored into winning percentage or games behind (and were often replayed again) occurred throughout the season.

==== American League ====
- Chicago White Sox, 1
- Cleveland Indians, 1
- Detroit Tigers, 1
- Philadelphia Athletics, 1

==== National League ====
- Boston Braves, 1
- Brooklyn Robins, 1
- Chicago Cubs, 2
- Cincinnati Reds, 2
- New York Giants, 2
- Philadelphia Phillies, 1
- Pittsburgh Pirates, 1

== Postseason ==
The postseason began on October 4 and ended on October 8 with the New York Giants sweeping the New York Yankees in the 1922 World Series in four games.

=== Bracket ===
World Series
AL	New York Yankees	0
NL	New York Giants	4

== Managerial changes ==
=== Off-season ===
Team	Former Manager	New Manager
Washington Senators	George McBride	Clyde Milan

=== In-season ===
Team	Former Manager	New Manager
Pittsburgh Pirates	George Gibson	Bill McKechnie

== League leaders ==
=== American League ===
Hitting leaders
Stat	Player	Total
AVG	George Sisler (SLB)	.420
OPS	Babe Ruth (NYY)	1.106
HR	Ken Williams (SLB)	39
RBI	Ken Williams (SLB)	155
R	George Sisler (SLB)	134
H	George Sisler (SLB)	246
SB	George Sisler (SLB)	51

Pitching leaders
Stat	Player	Total
W	Eddie Rommel (PHA)	27
L	Slim Harriss (PHA)	20
ERA	Red Faber (CWS)	2.81
K	Urban Shocker (SLB)	149
IP	Red Faber (CWS)	352.0
SV	Sad Sam Jones (NYY)	8
WHIP	Red Faber (CWS)	1.185

=== National League ===
Hitting leaders
Stat	Player	Total
AVG	Rogers Hornsby^{1} (STL)	.401
OPS	Rogers Hornsby (STL)	1.181
HR	Rogers Hornsby^{1} (STL)	42
RBI	Rogers Hornsby^{1} (STL)	152
R	Rogers Hornsby (STL)	141
H	Rogers Hornsby (STL)	250
SB	Max Carey (PIT)	51

^{1} National League Triple Crown batting winner

Pitching leaders
Stat	Player	Total
W	Eppa Rixey (CIN)	25
L	Dolf Luque (CIN)	23
ERA	Phil Douglas (NYG)	2.63
K	Dazzy Vance (BRO)	134
IP	Eppa Rixey (CIN)	313.1
SV	Clyde Barfoot (STL); Lou North (STL)	6
WHIP	Phil Douglas (NYG)	1.199

== Milestones ==
=== Batters ===
==== Cycles ====
- Ross Youngs (NYG):
  - Youngs hit for his first cycle and seventh in franchise history, on April 29 against the Boston Braves.
- Jimmy Johnston (BRO):
  - Johnston hit for his first cycle and second in franchise history, in game one of a doubleheader on May 25 against the Philadelphia Phillies.
- Ray Schalk (CWS):
  - Schalk hit for his first cycle and first in franchise history, on June 27 against the Detroit Tigers.
- Bob Meusel (NYY):
  - Meusel hit for his second cycle and third in franchise history, on July 3 against the Philadelphia Athletics.

==== Other batting accomplishments ====
- Max Carey (PIT):
  - Recorded his 500th career stolen base in the seventh inning against the Chicago Cubs on June 28. He became the 19th player to reach this mark.
- Eddie Collins (CWS):
  - Recorded his 600th career stolen base in the first inning against the Detroit Tigers on July 1. He became the seventh player to reach this mark.
- Ken Williams (SLB):
  - Set a Major League record by hitting home runs in six consecutive games between July 28 and August 2.

=== Pitchers ===
==== Perfect games ====
- Charlie Robertson (CWS):
  - Pitched the fifth perfect game in major league history and the first in franchise history on April 30 against the Detroit Tigers. Joss threw 90 pitches and struck out six in the 2–0 victory.

==== No-hitters ====
- Jesse Barnes (NYG):
  - Barnes threw his first career no-hitter and the seventh no-hitter in franchise history, by defeating the Philadelphia Phillies 6–0 on May 7. Barnes walked one and struck out five.

=== Miscellaneous ===
- Chicago Cubs:
  - Set a modern (1900–present) major league record for most runs scored in the fourth inning, by scoring 14 runs against the Philadelphia Phillies on August 25.

== Awards and honors ==
- League Award: George Sisler (SLB)

== Home field attendance ==
Team name	Wins	%±	Home attendance	%±	Per game
New York Yankees	94	-4.1%	1,026,134	-16.6%	13,326
New York Giants	93	-1.1%	945,809	-2.8%	11,972
Detroit Tigers	79	11.3%	861,206	30.2%	11,184
St. Louis Browns	93	14.8%	712,918	100.3%	9,259
Chicago White Sox	77	24.2%	602,860	10.9%	7,829
Chicago Cubs	80	25.0%	542,283	32.2%	7,135
St. Louis Cardinals	85	-2.3%	536,998	39.6%	6,974
Cleveland Indians	78	-17.0%	528,145	-29.5%	6,602
Pittsburgh Pirates	85	-5.6%	523,675	-25.4%	6,714
Brooklyn Robins	76	-1.3%	498,865	-18.7%	6,396
Cincinnati Reds	86	22.9%	493,754	58.6%	6,250
Washington Senators	69	-13.8%	458,552	0.5%	5,804
Philadelphia Athletics	65	22.6%	425,356	23.5%	5,453
Boston Red Sox	61	-18.7%	259,184	-7.2%	3,550
Philadelphia Phillies	57	11.8%	232,471	-15.1%	3,019
Boston Braves	53	-32.9%	167,965	-47.3%	2,210

== See also ==
- 1922 in baseball (Events, Births, Deaths)
