= Minnesota Twins all-time roster =

List of baseball players

The following is a list of players, both past and current, who appeared at least in one game for the Minnesota Twins American League franchise (1961–present), also known previously as the Washington Senators (1901–1960).

== A ==
- Fernando Abad
- Paul Abbott
- Mick Abel
- Brent Abernathy
- Ted Abernathy
- A. J. Achter
- José Acosta
- Merito Acosta
- Austin Adams
- Glenn Adams
- Mike Adams
- Rick Adams
- Spencer Adams
- Travis Adams
- Morrie Aderholt
- Dewey Adkins
- Ehire Adrianza
- Joe Agler
- Sam Agnew
- Juan Agosto
- Rick Aguilera
- Eddie Ainsmith
- Jerry Akers
- Joe Albanese
- Andrew Albers
- Vic Albury
- Jorge Alcala
- Scott Aldred
- Bernie Allen
- Chad Allen
- Bob Allison
- Mel Almada
- Dave Altizer
- Joe Altobelli
- Nick Altrock
- Ossie Álvarez
- Brant Alyea
- Allan Anderson
- John Anderson
- Red Anderson
- Shaun Anderson
- Bill Andrus
- Pete Appleton
- Chris Archer
- George Archie
- Oswaldo Arcia
- Danny Ardoin
- Orville Armbrust
- Luis Arráez
- Gerry Arrigo
- Fernando Arroyo
- Ken Aspromonte
- Willians Astudillo
- Keith Atherton
- Lefty Atkinson
- Jake Atz
- Tyler Austin
- Alex Avila
- Luis Ayala
- Doc Ayers

== B ==
- Wally Backman
- Mike Bacsik
- Harrison Bader
- Homer Bailey
- Chuck Baker
- Doug Baker
- Floyd Baker
- Jesse Baker
- Scott Baker
- Jordan Balazovic
- James Baldwin
- Grant Balfour
- Pelham Ballenger
- Win Ballou
- Eddie Bane
- George Banks
- Willie Banks
- Travis Baptist
- Red Barbary
- Steve Barber
- Turner Barber
- Bruce Barmes
- Charlie Barnes
- John Barnes
- Red Barnes
- Kyle Barraclough
- Bill Barrett
- Frank Barron
- Jason Bartlett
- Brian Bass
- Dick Bass
- Randy Bass
- Tony Batista
- Earl Battey
- Don Baylor
- Walter Beall
- Belve Bean
- Billy Beane
- Gene Bearden
- Heinie Beckendorf
- Charlie Becker
- Rich Becker
- Julio Bécquer
- Steve Bedrosian
- Joe Beimel
- Matt Belisle
- Josh Bell
- Erik Bennett
- Allen Benson
- Joe Benson
- Jack Bentley
- Lou Berberet
- Juan Berenguer
- James Beresford
- Moe Berg
- Johnny Berger
- Sean Bergman
- Bob Berman
- Doug Bernier
- José Berríos
- Reno Bertoia
- Karl Best
- Bill Bethea
- Lou Bevil
- Harry Biemiller
- George Binks
- Red Bird
- Jeff Bittiger
- Joe Black
- Nick Blackburn
- Casey Blake
- Henry Blanco
- Travis Blankenhorn
- Cliff Blankenship
- Scott Blewett
- Bruno Block
- Jimmy Bloodworth
- Bud Bloomfield
- Ossie Bluege
- Bert Blyleven
- Joe Boehling
- Bob Boken
- Joe Bokina
- Ed Boland
- Milt Bolling
- Cliff Bolton
- Walt Bond
- Joe Bonikowski
- Gus Bono
- Boof Bonser
- Zeke Bonura
- Greg Booker
- Al Bool
- Bret Boone
- Pat Borders
- Glenn Borgmann
- Paul Boris
- Buddy Boshers
- Harley Boss
- Lyman Bostock
- Dave Boswell
- Pat Bourque
- Caleb Boushley
- Rob Bowen
- Shane Bowers
- Elmer Bowman
- Matt Bowman
- Travis Bowyer
- Blaine Boyer
- Taj Bradley
- George Bradshaw
- Bucky Brandon
- Steve Braun
- Garland Braxton
- Brent Brede
- Ad Brennan
- Craig Breslow
- Ken Brett
- Jonah Bride
- Rocky Bridges
- Johnny Briggs
- Jim Brillheart
- Bernardo Brito
- Dick Brodowski
- Tony Brottem
- Frank Brower
- Alton Brown
- Darrell Brown
- Jarvis Brown
- Lloyd Brown
- Mark Brown
- George Browne
- Fred Bruckbauer
- J. T. Bruett
- Greg Brummett
- Tom Brunansky
- Steve Brye
- Brian Buchanan
- Garland Buckeye
- Bud Bulling
- Eric Bullock
- Dylan Bundy
- Tom Burgmeier
- Bobby Burke
- Alex Burnett
- Bill Burns
- Sean Burroughs
- Beau Burrows
- Jared Burton
- Dennis Burtt
- Jim Busby
- Brian Buscher
- Alan Busenitz
- Donie Bush
- Joe Bush
- Randy Bush
- John Butcher
- Drew Butera
- Sal Butera
- Ed Butka
- Bill Butler
- Byron Buxton
- Bud Byerly
- Tommy Byrne

== C ==
- Génesis Cabrera
- Orlando Cabrera
- Carmen Cali
- Paul Calvert
- Jack Calvo
- Jair Camargo
- Archie Campbell
- Bill Campbell
- Bruce Campbell
- John Campbell
- Kevin Campbell
- Sal Campisi
- Frank Campos
- John Candelaria
- Milo Candini
- Jay Canizaro
- Yennier Canó
- Matt Capps
- Leo Cárdenas
- Rod Carew
- Scoops Carey
- Víctor Caratini
- Leon Carlson
- Steve Carlton
- Roy Carlyle
- Lew Carpenter
- Héctor Carrasco
- Alex Carrasquel
- Bill Carrick
- Don Carrithers
- Jamey Carroll
- Matt Carson
- Scott Cary
- Joe Cascarella
- George Case
- Joe Casey
- Carl Cashion
- Larry Casian
- Alexi Casilla
- Harry Cassady
- Joe Cassidy
- Bobby Castillo
- Carmen Castillo
- Diego Castillo (infielder)
- Diego Castillo (pitcher)
- Luis Castillo
- John Castino
- Jason Castro
- Juan Castro
- Willi Castro
- Eli Cates
- Hardin Cathey
- Jake Cave
- Gilberto Celestino
- Juan Centeno
- Bob Chakales
- Dean Chance
- Ben Chapman
- Ed Chapman
- J. T. Chargois
- Mike Chartak
- Ken Chase
- Harry Child
- Rich Chiles
- Walt Chipple
- Neil Chrisley
- John Christensen
- Mark Christman
- Al Cicotte
- Pete Cimino
- Jeff Cirillo
- Howie Clark
- Jerald Clark
- Jim Clark
- Ron Clark
- Boileryard Clarke
- Webbo Clarke
- Ellis Clary
- Joe Cleary
- Kody Clemens
- Tex Clevenger
- Harlond Clift
- Billy Clingman
- Tyler Clippard
- Otis Clymer
- Gil Coan
- Dick Coffman
- Syd Cohen
- Chris Colabello
- Greg Colbrunn
- Alex Cole
- Edwar Colina
- Orth Collins
- Jackie Collum
- Alex Colomé
- Bartolo Colón
- Merl Combs
- Keith Comstock
- Tom Connolly
- Bill Conroy
- Wid Conroy
- Billy Consolo
- Jim Constable
- Sandy Consuegra
- Mark Contreras
- Charlie Conway
- Jerry Conway
- Mike Cook
- Ron Coomer
- Cal Cooper
- Don Cooper
- Henry Coppola
- Doug Corbett
- Ray Corbin
- Tim Corcoran
- Marty Cordova
- Carlos Correa
- Kevin Correia
- Jharel Cotton
- Neal Cotts
- Bill Coughlin
- Danny Coulombe
- Clint Courtney
- Harry Courtney
- Stan Coveleski
- Molly Craft
- Jesse Crain
- Doc Cramer
- Sam Crane
- Gavvy Cravath
- Joe Crede
- Jack Cressend
- Jerry Crider
- Herb Crompton
- C. J. Cron
- Joe Cronin
- Tom Crooke
- Lave Cross
- Frank Croucher
- Alvin Crowder
- Ed Crowley
- Nelson Cruz
- Mike Cubbage
- Michael Cuddyer
- Bert Cueto
- Leon Culberson
- Roy Cullenbine
- Nick Cullop
- Kaelen Culpepper
- Midre Cummings
- Bill Cunningham
- Bill Currie
- Vern Curtis
- John Curtiss

== D ==
- Bill Dailey
- Logan Darnell
- Bobby Darwin
- Yo-Yo Davalillo
- Andre David
- Claude Davidson
- Cleatus Davidson
- Mark Davidson
- Chili Davis
- Ike Davis
- Noah Davis
- Ron Davis
- Chase De Jong
- José De León
- Harry Dean
- Pat Dean
- Buddy Dear
- Joe Decker
- Samuel Deduno
- Ed Delahanty
- Jim Delahanty
- Rob Delaney
- Juan Delis
- Gene DeMontreville
- Rick Dempsey
- Sam Dente
- Julio DePaula
- Jim Deshaies
- Jimmie DeShong
- Cole De Vries
- Scott Diamond
- R. A. Dickey
- Bill Dietrich
- Roy Dietzel
- Jay Difani
- Reese Diggs
- Brian Dinkelman
- Sonny Dixon
- Dan Dobbek
- Randy Dobnak
- Jiggs Donahue
- Tim Donahue
- Josh Donaldson
- Jim Donohue
- Patsy Donovan
- Gary Dotter
- Ryan Doumit
- Jack Doyle
- Brian Dozier
- Buzz Dozier
- Larry Drake
- Oliver Drake
- Lew Drill
- Tom Drohan
- Tim Drummond
- Daniel Duarte
- Brian Duensing
- Pat Duff
- Tyler Duffey
- Gus Dugas
- Zach Duke
- Phil Dumatrait
- George Dumont
- Sam Dungan
- Davey Dunkle
- Steve Dunn
- Jhoan Durán
- Mike Durant
- J. D. Durbin
- Bull Durham
- Mike Duvall
- Jim Dwyer
- Mike Dyer
- Sam Dyson

== E ==
- Ryan Eades
- Jake Early
- Carl East
- Ed Edelen
- Tom Edens
- Bob Edmundson
- Sam Edmonston
- Bruce Edwards
- Dave Edwards
- Jim Eisenreich
- Kid Elberfeld
- Frank Ellerbe
- Bones Ely
- Joe Engel
- Dave Engle
- Russ Ennis
- Dietrich Enns
- Eric Erickson
- Roger Erickson
- Scott Erickson
- Cal Ermer
- Eduardo Escobar
- Álvaro Espinoza
- Bobby Estalella
- Frank Eufemia
- Al Evans
- Joe Evans
- Adam Everett
- Bill Everitt
- Willie Eyre

== F ==
- Lenny Faedo
- Cy Falkenberg
- Kyle Farmer
- Luke Farrell
- John Farrell
- Terry Felton
- Alex Ferguson
- Rick Ferrell
- Wes Ferrell
- Sergio Ferrer
- Tom Ferrick
- David Festa
- Mike Fetters
- Johnny Field
- Casey Fien
- Danny Fife
- Mark Filley
- Pete Filson
- Tony Fiore
- Bill Fischer
- Carl Fischer
- Clarence Fisher
- Showboat Fisher
- Ed Fitz Gerald
- Ryan Fitzgerald
- Ira Flagstead
- Ángel Fleitas
- Randy Flores
- Pedro Florimón
- Dylan Floro
- John Flynn
- Ray Fontenot
- Dan Ford
- Lew Ford
- Bill Forman
- Mike Fornieles
- Logan Forsythe
- Jerry Fosnow
- George Foss
- Eddie Foster
- Pop Foster
- Matt Fox
- Ty France
- Ray Francis
- George Frazier
- Kevin Frederick
- Jerry Freeman
- Skipper Friday
- Bob Friedrichs
- Eric Fryer
- Brian Fuentes
- Sam Fuld
- Aaron Fultz
- Kody Funderburk
- Mark Funderburk

== G ==
- Armando Gabino
- Gary Gaetti
- Greg Gagne
- Chick Gagnon
- Nemo Gaines
- Stan Galle
- Bert Gallia
- Joey Gallo
- Chick Gandil
- Bob Ganley
- John Gant
- Babe Ganzel
- Keith Garagozzo
- Rich Garcés
- Édgar García
- Jaime Garcia
- Ramón García
- Billy Gardner
- Kyle Garlick
- Mitch Garver
- Matt Garza
- Ralph Garza
- Mickey Gasper
- Dave Gassner
- Milt Gaston
- Brent Gates
- Dale Gear
- Cory Gearrin
- Bob Gebhard
- Elmer Gedeon
- Joe Gedeon
- Dillon Gee
- Henry Gehring
- Charlie Gelbert
- George Genovese
- Doc Gessler
- Al Gettel
- Patsy Gharrity
- Ian Gibaut
- Kyle Gibson
- Paul Giel
- Ed Gill
- Johnny Gill
- Carden Gillenwater
- Grant Gillis
- Chris Gimenez
- Tony Giuliani
- Dan Gladden
- Joe Gleason
- Woo-suk Go
- José Godoy
- Ed Goebel
- Dave Goltz
- Carlos Gómez
- Chile Gómez
- Chris Gomez
- Lefty Gomez
- Luis Gómez
- Preston Gómez
- Rubén Gómez
- Yoendrys Gómez
- Stephen Gonsalves
- Vince Gonzales
- Chi Chi González
- Gabriel González
- Germán González
- Julio González
- Marwin González
- Charlie Gooch
- Clyde Goodwin
- Danny Goodwin
- Marv Goodwin
- Ray Goolsby
- Nick Gordon
- Bob Gorinski
- Johnny Goryl
- Goose Goslin
- Mauro Gozzo
- Joe Grace
- Mike Grady
- Dan Graham
- J. R. Graham
- Oscar Graham
- Wayne Granger
- Zack Granite
- Mudcat Grant
- Mickey Grasso
- Brusdar Graterol
- Dolly Gray
- Jeff Gray
- Milt Gray
- Sonny Gray
- Tristan Gray
- Lenny Green
- Vean Gregg
- Seth Greisinger
- Bert Griffith
- Clark Griffith
- Hal Griggs
- Connie Grob
- Bob Groom
- Harley Grossman
- Robbie Grossman
- Johnny Groth
- Roy Grover
- Joe Grzenda
- Eddie Guardado
- Mike Guerra
- Matt Guerrier
- Randy Gumpert
- Bucky Guth
- Mark Guthrie
- Cristian Guzmán

== H ==
- Eric Hacker
- Bump Hadley
- Mickey Haefner
- Dick Hahn
- Chip Hale
- David Hale
- Justin Haley
- Jimmie Hall
- Tom Hall
- Billy Hamilton
- Caleb Hamilton
- Ian Hamilton
- Pete Hamm
- Bill Hands
- Greg Hansell
- Roy Hansen
- J. A. Happ
- Carroll Hardy
- Harry Hardy
- J. J. Hardy
- Jack Hardy
- Pinky Hargrave
- Brian Harper
- Harry Harper
- Ryne Harper
- Brendan Harris
- Bucky Harris
- Dave Harris
- Greg Harris
- Joe Harris
- Lum Harris
- Mickey Harris
- Spencer Harris
- Roric Harrison
- Earl Harrist
- Mike Hart
- Mike Hartley
- Paul Hartzell
- Thomas Hatch
- Mickey Hatcher
- Brad Havens
- Roy Hawes
- LaTroy Hawkins
- Hal Haydel
- Jackie Hayes
- Jim Hayes
- Joe Haynes
- Brent Headrick
- Jeff Heath
- Neal Heaton
- Harry Hedgpeth
- Chris Heintz
- Jim Heise
- Michael Helman
- Frank Hemphill
- Jack Hendricks
- Liam Hendriks
- Sean Henn
- Ronny Henriquez
- John Henry
- Ron Henry
- Phil Hensiek
- Evelio Hernández
- Jackie Hernández
- Liván Hernández
- Pedro Hernández
- Rudy Hernández
- Tom Herr
- Walt Herrell
- Herb Herring
- Lefty Herring
- Chris Herrmann
- Whitey Herzog
- Chris Heston
- Mike Heydon
- Charlie Hickman
- Aaron Hicks
- Trevor Hildenberger
- Donnie Hill
- Herman Hill
- Hunter Hill
- Jesse Hill
- Rich Hill
- Dutch Hinrichs
- Larry Hisle
- Billy Hitchcock
- Lloyd Hittle
- John Hobbs
- Denny Hocking
- Mel Hoderlein
- Ed Hodge
- Jim Hoey
- Izzy Hoffman
- Jeff Hoffman
- Ray Hoffman
- Shanty Hogan
- Elon Hogsett
- Wally Holborow
- Sammy Holbrook
- Bill Hollahan
- Bill Holland
- Al Hollingsworth
- Bonnie Hollingsworth
- Dave Hollins
- Jeff Holly
- Steve Holm
- Ducky Holmes
- Jim Holt
- Paul Hopkins
- Bill Hopper
- Vince Horsman
- Ed Hovlik
- Joe Hovlik
- Dave Howard
- Steve Howe
- Kent Hrbek
- Justin Huber
- Willis Hudlin
- Orlando Hudson
- Sid Hudson
- Frank Huelsman
- Dusty Hughes
- Jim Hughes
- Luke Hughes
- Phil Hughes
- Tom Hughes
- Philip Humber
- Randy Hundley
- Torii Hunter
- Butch Huskey
- Dick Hyde

== I ==
- Riccardo Ingram
- Cole Irvin
- Hank Izquierdo

== J ==
- Darrell Jackson
- Darrin Jackson
- Jay Jackson
- Mike Jackson
- Ron Jackson
- Roy Lee Jackson
- Bucky Jacobs
- Jake Jacobs
- Beany Jacobson
- Chuck James
- Charlie Jamieson
- Hal Janvrin
- Kevin Jarvis
- Griffin Jax
- Tex Jeanes
- Ryan Jeffers
- Walker Jenkins
- Jackie Jensen
- Marcus Jensen
- Kevin Jepsen
- Houston Jiménez
- Adam Johnson
- Bob Johnson
- Dave Johnson
- Don Johnson
- Ed Johnson
- Kris Johnson
- Randy Johnson
- Tom Johnson
- Walter Johnson
- Greg Johnston
- Charlie Jones
- Dick Jones
- Garrett Jones
- Jacque Jones
- Sam Jones
- Todd Jones
- Buck Jordan
- Rip Jordan
- Tim Jordan
- Felix Jorge
- Ryan Jorgensen
- Terry Jorgensen
- Ralph Judd
- Joe Judge
- Edouard Julien

== K ==
- Jim Kaat
- Mike Kahoe
- Alex Kampouris
- Bill Kay
- Luke Keaschall
- Burt Keeley
- DaShawn Keirsey Jr.
- Bill Keister
- Hal Keller
- Ron Keller
- Harry Kelley
- Frank Kelliher
- Pat Kelly
- Roberto Kelly
- Speed Kelly
- Tom Kelly
- Russ Kemmerer
- Eddie Kenna
- Bill Kennedy
- Vern Kennedy
- Bill Kenworthy
- Max Kepler
- Bobby Keppel
- Gus Keriazakos
- John Kerr
- Dallas Keuchel
- Bobby Kielty
- Harmon Killebrew
- Red Killefer
- Dick Kimble
- Jerry Kindall
- Wes Kingdon
- Tyler Kinley
- Matt Kinney
- Mike Kinnunen
- Brandon Kintzler
- Bob Kipper
- Alex Kirilloff
- Frank Kitson
- Malachi Kittridge
- Tom Klawitter
- John Klein
- Ed Klieman
- Bob Kline
- Bobby Kline
- Ron Kline
- Scott Klingenbeck
- Joe Klink
- Johnny Klippstein
- Elmer Klumpp
- Clyde Kluttz
- Lou Knerr
- John Knight
- Chuck Knoblauch
- Punch Knoll
- Joe Kohlman
- Erik Komatsu
- Jerry Koosman
- Merlin Kopp
- Steve Korcheck
- Bobby Korecky
- Andy Kosco
- Corey Koskie
- Frank Kostro
- Al Kozar
- Joe Krakauskas
- Jack Kralick
- Mike Kreevich
- Red Kress
- Brooks Kriske
- Bill Krueger
- Jason Kubel
- Joe Kuhel
- Rusty Kuntz
- Craig Kusick
- Bob Kuzava
- Al Kvasnak

== L ==
- Al LaMacchia
- Ryan LaMarre
- David Lamb
- Mike Lamb
- Bobby LaMotte
- Dick Lanahan
- Doc Land
- Ken Landreaux
- Jerry Lane
- Sam Lanford
- Pete Lapan
- Frank LaPorte
- Gene Larkin
- Trevor Larnach
- Dave LaRoche
- Lyn Lary
- Fred Lasher
- Bill Latham
- Chris Latham
- Tim Laudner
- Doc Lavan
- Derek Law
- Matt Lawton
- Cody Laweryson
- Justin Lawrence
- Hillis Layne
- Charlie Lea
- Terry Leach
- Matthew LeCroy
- Brooks Lee
- Derek Lee
- Don Lee
- Watty Lee
- Bill Lefebvre
- Wade Lefler
- Nemo Leibold
- Ed Leip
- Scott Leius
- Jack Lelivelt
- Jim Lemon
- Dutch Leonard
- Joe Leonard
- Ted Lepcio
- Charlie Letchas
- Jesse Levan
- Buddy Lewis
- Duffy Lewis
- Jim Lewis
- Royce Lewis
- Pat Light
- Tzu-Wei Lin
- Mike Lincoln
- Ed Linke
- Francisco Liriano
- Nelson Liriano
- Joe Lis
- Hod Lisenbee
- Ad Liska
- Zack Littell
- Jeff Little
- Mickey Livingston
- Bob Loane
- George Loepp
- Frank Loftus
- Kyle Lohse
- Steve Lombardozzi
- Tom Long
- Bruce Look
- Jorge López
- Pablo López
- Slim Love
- Dwight Lowry
- Steve Luebber
- Ralph Lumenti
- Tom Lundstedt
- Jordan Luplow
- Charlie Luskey
- Lyle Luttrell
- Jim Lyle
- Jerry Lynn
- Lance Lynn
- Ed Lyons
- Rick Lysander

== M ==
- Kevin Maas
- Danny MacFayden
- Shane Mack
- Pete Mackanin
- Felix Mackiewicz
- Matt Macri
- Kenta Maeda
- Héctor Maestri
- Matt Magill
- Ron Mahay
- Tyler Mahle
- Pat Mahomes
- Mike Maksudian
- Bobby Malkmus
- Jim Mallory
- Matt Maloney
- Frank Mancuso
- Jim Manning
- Fred Manrique
- Jeff Manship
- Charlie Manuel
- Moxie Manuel
- Heinie Manush
- Howard Maple
- Georges Maranda
- Firpo Marberry
- Manuel Margot
- Red Marion
- Jason Marquis
- Connie Marrero
- Fred Marsh
- Mike Marshall
- Austin Martin
- Billy Martin
- Joe Martin
- Joe Martina
- Marty Martínez
- Rogelio Martínez
- Tippy Martinez
- Del Mason
- Mike Mason
- Dan Masteller
- Walt Masters
- Walt Masterson
- Darin Mastroianni
- Eddie Matteson
- Wid Matthews
- Zebby Matthews
- Joe Mauer
- Carmen Mauro
- Jason Maxwell
- Trevor May
- Sam Mayer
- Joe Mays
- Bill McAfee
- Tom McAvoy
- George McBride
- Tom McBride
- Joe McCabe
- David McCarty
- Darren McCaughan
- Alex McColl
- Barry McCormick
- Mike McCormick
- Quinton McCracken
- Paul McCullough
- Phil McCullough
- Carson McCusker
- Mickey McDermott
- Danny McDevitt
- Darnell McDonald
- John McDonald
- Howie McFarland
- Frank McGee
- Slim McGrew
- Vance McIlree
- Dave McKay
- Al McLean
- Jim McLeod
- Hugh McMullen
- Mike McNally
- George McNamara
- Earl McNeely
- Pat Meares
- Sammy Meeks
- Trevor Megill
- Dave Meier
- Adalberto Mejia
- Sam Mele
- Minnie Mendoza
- Mike Menosky
- Orlando Mercado
- Win Mercer
- Orlando Merced
- Brett Merriman
- Jim Merritt
- Jim Mertz
- Matt Merullo
- Irish Meusel
- Alex Meyer
- Cass Michaels
- Doug Mientkiewicz
- John Mihalic
- José Mijares
- Clyde Milan
- Horace Milan
- Larry Milbourne
- Mike Milchin
- Dee Miles
- Bing Miller
- Bob Miller
- Corky Miller
- Damian Miller
- Ian Miller
- Jason Miller
- Ox Miller
- Ralph Miller (3B)
- Ralph Miller (LHP)
- Ronny Miller
- Travis Miller
- Warren Miller
- Wally Millies
- John Milligan
- Tommy Milone
- Eric Milton
- Juan Minaya
- Don Mincher
- Don Minnick
- José Miranda
- Willy Miranda
- Anthony Misiewicz
- Bobby Mitchell
- Mike Mitchell
- Monroe Mitchell
- George Mitterwald
- Chad Moeller
- Danny Moeller
- George Mogridge
- Dustan Mohr
- Paul Molitor
- Craig Monroe
- René Monteagudo
- Dan Monzon
- Carlos Moore
- Gene Moore
- Ray Moore
- José Morales (DH/1B)
- José Morales (C)
- Kendrys Morales
- Charles Moran
- Jovani Morán
- Roy Moran
- Julio Moreno
- Mike Morgan
- Ray Morgan
- Tom Morgan
- Juan Morillo
- Mike Morin
- Bill Morley
- Justin Morneau
- Bill Morrell
- Andrew Morris
- Danny Morris
- Jack Morris
- Warren Morris
- Logan Morrison
- John Moses
- Danny Mota
- Taylor Motter
- Gabriel Moya
- Ed Moyer
- Terry Mulholland
- Jim Mullen
- Dick Mulligan
- George Mullin
- Kevin Mulvey
- Oscar Múñoz
- Pedro Muñoz
- Buzz Murphy
- John Ryan Murphy
- Bill Murray
- Bobby Murray
- George Murray
- Danny Musser
- Paul Musser
- George Myatt
- Buddy Myer
- Greg Myers

== N ==
- Steve Nagy
- Mike Nakamura
- Hal Naragon
- Cotton Nash
- Joe Nathan
- Dan Naulty
- Denny Neagle
- Doug Neff
- Mel Nelson
- Pat Neshek
- Graig Nettles
- Jim Nettles
- Phil Nevin
- Al Newman
- Bobo Newsom
- Joe Niekro
- Randy Niemann
- Chuck Nieson
- Tom Nieto
- Johnny Niggeling
- Rabbit Nill
- Tsuyoshi Nishioka
- Otis Nixon
- Russ Nixon
- Ricky Nolasco
- Irv Noren
- Tom Norton
- Willie Norwood
- Joe Nossek
- Eduardo Núñez

== O ==
- Bailey Ober
- Frank Oberlin
- Jack O'Brien
- Pete O'Brien
- Tommy O'Brien
- Alex Ochoa
- Jack O'Connor
- Jake Odorizzi
- Bryan Oelkers
- José Offerman
- Curly Ogden
- Joe Ohl
- Pierson Ohl
- Augie Ojeda
- Steven Okert
- Len Okrie
- Bob Oldis
- Tony Oliva
- Francisco Oliveras
- Lester Oliveros
- Jim Ollom
- Greg Olson
- Gregg Olson
- Karl Olson
- Mickey O'Neil
- Bill O'Neill
- Jim O'Neill
- Eddie Onslow
- Ernie Oravetz
- Jesse Orosco
- Frank O'Rourke
- Ryan O'Rourke
- Oliver Ortega
- Al Orth
- Baby Ortiz
- David Ortiz
- Junior Ortiz
- Ramón Ortiz
- Roberto Ortiz
- Champ Osteen
- Johnny Ostrowski
- Bill Otey
- James Outman

== P ==
- John Pacella
- Chris Paddack
- Tom Padden
- Emilio Pagán
- Mike Pagliarulo
- Jermaine Palacios
- Mike Palagyi
- Emilio Palmero
- Ed Palmquist
- Byung-ho Park
- Blake Parker
- Derek Parks
- Chris Parmelee
- José Parra
- Camilo Pascual
- Carlos Pascual
- Larry Pashnick
- Frank Pastore
- Case Patten
- Carlos Paula
- Carl Pavano
- Mike Pazik
- Jim Pearce
- Albie Pearson
- Roger Peckinpaugh
- Les Peden
- Mike Pelfrey
- Barney Pelty
- Luis Perdomo
- Jhonny Pereda
- Martín Pérez
- Dan Perkins
- Glen Perkins
- Sam Perlozzo
- Ron Perranoski
- Nig Perrine
- Jim Perry
- Stan Perzanowski
- Johnny Pesky
- Gregorio Petit
- Jay Pettibone
- Leon Pettit
- Bill Phebus
- Babe Phelps
- Eddie Phillips
- Tom Phillips
- Val Picinich
- Charlie Pick
- Ollie Pickering
- Marino Pieretti
- A. J. Pierzynski
- Michael Pineda
- Yohan Pino
- Josmil Pinto
- Alex Pitko
- Chris Pittaro
- Bill Pleis
- Herb Plews
- Trevor Plouffe
- Mike Poepping
- Jimmy Pofahl
- Jorge Polanco
- Sidney Ponson
- Sean Poppen
- Dan Porter
- Jay Porter
- Bob Porterfield
- Mark Portugal
- Wally Post
- Squire Potter
- Hosken Powell
- Jake Powell
- Paul Powell
- Vic Power
- Ryan Pressly
- Bob Prichard
- Jerry Priddy
- Jason Pridie
- Connor Prielipp
- Alex Prieto
- Ray Prim
- Tom Prince
- Jake Propst
- Doc Prothro
- Kirby Puckett
- Carlos Pulido
- Spencer Pumpelly
- Nick Punto
- Pat Putnam
- Ewald Pyle

== Q ==
- Hal Quick
- Frank Quilici
- Tom Quinlan
- Joe Quinn
- Luis Quiñones

== R ==
- Brian Raabe
- Josh Rabe
- Brad Radke
- Rob Radlosky
- Frank Ragland
- Doc Ralston
- Erasmo Ramírez
- Neil Ramirez
- Wilkin Ramírez
- Pedro Ramos
- Wilson Ramos
- Bob Randall
- Earl Rapp
- Gary Rath
- Paul Ratliff
- Jon Rauch
- Shane Rawley
- Jeff Reardon
- Jeff Reboulet
- Pete Redfern
- Mark Redman
- Jack Redmond
- Mike Redmond
- Addison Reed
- Darren Reed
- Jeff Reed
- Rick Reed
- Stan Rees
- Rich Reese
- Bobby Reeves
- Rob Refsnyder
- Herman Reich
- Doc Reisling
- Rick Renick
- Bob Repass
- Jason Repko
- Michael Restovich
- Ben Revere
- Dennys Reyes
- Carl Reynolds
- Harry Rice
- Sam Rice
- Trevor Richards
- J. T. Riddle
- Johnny Riddle
- Topper Rigney
- Jim Riley
- Juan Rincón
- Todd Ritchie
- Luis Rivas
- Bombo Rivera
- René Rivera
- Joe Roa
- Roxie Roach
- Red Roberts
- Dick Robertson
- Rich Robertson
- Sherry Robertson
- Tyler Robertson
- Eddie Robinson
- Rabbit Robinson
- Shane Robinson
- Hansel Robles
- Armando Roche
- Alan Roden
- Fernando Rodney
- Dereck Rodríguez
- Frank Rodriguez
- José Rodríguez
- Luis Rodríguez
- Vic Rodriguez
- Clay Roe
- Josh Roenicke
- Buck Rogers
- Kenny Rogers
- Taylor Rogers
- Garry Roggenburk
- Tony Roig
- Kendry Rojas
- Jim Roland
- Rich Rollins
- Fernando Romero
- J. C. Romero
- Jhon Romero
- Sergio Romo
- John Romonosky
- Henri Rondeau
- Phil Roof
- Brent Rooker
- Ben Rortvedt
- Eddie Rosario
- Randy Rosario
- John Roseboro
- Bob Ross
- Braggo Roth
- Claude Rothgeb
- Drew Rucinski
- Muddy Ruel
- Dutch Ruether
- Randy Ruiz
- Pete Runnels
- Allen Russell
- Jack Russell
- Jack Ryan
- Jason Ryan
- Jimmy Ryan
- Joe Ryan
- Michael Ryan

== S ==
- Aaron Sabato
- Alex Sabo
- Frank Sacka
- Ted Sadowski
- Mark Salas
- Ron Samford
- Benj Sampson
- Aaron Sanchez
- Alejandro Sánchez
- Gary Sánchez
- Raúl Sánchez
- Ken Sanders
- Cole Sands
- Fred Sanford
- Jack Sanford
- Mo Sanford
- Miguel Sano
- Carlos Santana
- Danny Santana
- Ervin Santana
- Johan Santana
- Hector Santiago
- Jack Savage
- Don Savidge
- Carl Sawyer
- Ray Scarborough
- Mac Scarce
- Al Schacht
- Germany Schaefer
- Jordan Schafer
- Logan Schafer
- Johnny Schaive
- Dan Schatzeder
- Owen Scheetz
- Lefty Schegg
- Fred Schemanske
- Larry Schlafly
- Johnny Schmitz
- Jerry Schoonmaker
- Jonathan Schoop
- Al Schroll
- Ken Schrom
- Ron Schueler
- Erik Schullstrom
- Art Schult
- Frank Schulte
- Fred Schulte
- Everett Scott
- Todd Sears
- Jimmy Sebring
- Duke Sedgwick
- Kip Selbach
- Dan Serafini
- Gary Serum
- John Sevcik
- Hank Severeid
- Luke Sewell
- Warren Shanabrook
- Howie Shanks
- Owen Shannon
- Red Shannon
- Shag Shaughnessy
- Jon Shave
- Jim Shaw
- Spec Shea
- Jim Shellenback
- Bert Shepard
- Fred Sherry
- Steve Shields
- Garland Shifflett
- Bill Shipke
- Art Shires
- Duke Shirey
- Mule Shirley
- Matt Shoemaker
- Burt Shotton
- Dwight Siebler
- Rubén Sierra
- Roy Sievers
- Carlos Silva
- Danny Silva
- Al Sima
- Al Simmons
- Andrelton Simmons
- John Simmons
- Bill Singer
- Elmer Singleton
- Fred Sington
- George Sisler
- Anthony Slama
- Jack Slattery
- Lou Sleater
- Aaron Slegers
- Kevin Slowey
- Roy Smalley
- Devin Smeltzer
- John Smiley
- Bull Smith
- Carr Smith
- Charlie Smith
- Earl Smith
- Elmer Smith
- Joe Smith
- Mike Smith
- Ray Smith
- Roy Smith
- Tony Smith
- Wally Smith
- Mike Smithson
- Bill Snyder
- Jerry Snyder
- Jim Snyder
- Eric Soderholm
- Rick Sofield
- Donovan Solano
- Jock Somerlott
- Paul Sorrento
- Dick Spalding
- Denard Span
- Tris Speaker
- By Speece
- Chris Speier
- Stan Spence
- Ben Spencer
- Roy Spencer
- Jack Spring
- Randy St. Claire
- Jake Stahl
- Scott Stahoviak
- Kevin Stanfield
- Lee Stange
- Joe Stanley
- Con Starkel
- Bill Starr
- Dick Starr
- Cody Stashak
- Tim Stauffer
- Josh Staumont
- Terry Steinbach
- Mike Stenhouse
- Buzz Stephen
- Dave Stevens
- Jim Stevens
- Andrew Stevenson
- Brock Stewart
- Bud Stewart
- Bunky Stewart
- Kohl Stewart
- Lefty Stewart
- Shannon Stewart
- Stuffy Stewart
- Dick Stigman
- Chuck Stobbs
- Dean Stone
- Dick Stone
- John Stone
- Les Straker
- Alan Strange
- Gabby Street
- Jim Strickland
- Luis Suárez
- Willie Sudhoff
- Denny Sullivan
- Frank Sullivan
- John Sullivan
- Steve Sundra
- Pete Susko
- Dizzy Sutherland
- John Sutton
- Kurt Suzuki
- Anthony Swarzak
- Greg Swindell

== T ==
- Jesse Tannehill
- Kevin Tapani
- Bennie Tate
- Hughie Tate
- Walt Tauscher
- Danny Taylor
- Fred Taylor
- Michael A. Taylor
- Tommy Taylor
- Nick Tepesch
- Jerry Terrell
- Wayne Terwilliger
- Dick Tettelbach
- Tim Teufel
- Bob Tewksbury
- Greg Thayer
- Jug Thesenga
- Caleb Thielbar
- Brad Thomas
- Bud Thomas
- Claude Thomas
- Clete Thomas
- Fred Thomas
- George Thomas
- Kite Thomas
- Lefty Thomas
- Myles Thomas
- Tommy Thomas
- Jim Thome
- Aaron Thompson
- Danny Thompson
- Forrest Thompson
- Harry Thompson
- Jack Thoney
- Paul Thormodsgard
- Tyler Thornburg
- Lewis Thorpe
- Faye Throneberry
- Lou Thuman
- Sloppy Thurston
- Luis Tiant
- Terry Tiffee
- Joe Tipton
- Tom Tischinski
- Jack Tobin
- Hal Toenes
- Matt Tolbert
- Freddie Toliver
- Doc Tonkin
- Michael Tonkin
- Justin Topa
- Gil Torres
- Ricardo Torres
- Ronald Torreyes
- Kelvin Torve
- Rene Tosoni
- César Tovar
- Happy Townsend
- Cecil Travis
- Ray Treadaway
- Frank Trechock
- Mike Trombley
- Bill Trotter
- George Tsamis
- Ollie Tucker
- Lee Tunnell
- Lucas Turk
- Nik Turley
- Bill Tuttle
- George Twombly
- Jason Tyner

== U ==
- Jimmy Uchrinscko
- Ted Uhlaender
- Scott Ullger
- Sandy Ullrich
- Tom Umphlett
- Bob Unglaub
- Tom Upton
- José Ureña
- Gio Urshela
- Bob Usher

== V ==
- Roy Valdés
- Sandy Valdespino
- José Valdivielso
- Danny Valencia
- Javier Valentín
- Vito Valentinetti
- Elmer Valo
- Clay Van Alstyne
- Louis Varland
- Ildemaro Vargas
- Kennys Vargas
- Buck Varner
- Andrew Vasquez
- Esmerling Vásquez
- Fred Vaughn
- Hippo Vaughn
- Christian Vázquez
- Bobby Veach
- Jesús Vega
- Vince Ventura
- Gene Verble
- John Verhoeven
- Mickey Vernon
- Zoilo Versalles
- Bob Veselic
- Nick Vincent
- Frank Viola
- Clyde Vollmer
- Cy Vorhees
- Joe Vosmik

== W ==
- Brandon Waddell
- Jake Wade
- LaMonte Wade Jr.
- Rip Wade
- Howard Wakefield
- Matt Walbeck
- Doc Waldbauer
- Irv Waldron
- Kyle Waldrop
- Dixie Walker (P)
- Gee Walker
- Tilly Walker
- Todd Walker
- Murray Wall
- Matt Wallner
- Charley Walters
- Mike Walters
- P. J. Walters
- Danny Walton
- Gary Ward
- Jay Ward
- Curt Wardle
- Cy Warmoth
- John Warner
- Jimmy Wasdell
- Ron Washington
- Scott Watkins
- Tommy Watkins
- Allie Watt
- Gary Wayne
- Jim Weaver
- Monte Weaver
- Lenny Webster
- Ralph Weigel
- Dick Weik
- Johnny Welaj
- Bob Wells
- Greg Wells
- Dick Welteroth
- Joey Wentz
- Vic Wertz
- David West
- Sam West
- Jason Wheeler
- Pete Whisenant
- Bill Whitby
- Rondell White
- Steve White
- Aaron Whitefield
- Earl Whitehill
- Charlie Whitehouse
- Len Whitehouse
- Bob Wiesler
- Mark Wiley
- Rob Wilfong
- Adam Wilk
- Albert Williams
- Don Williams
- Glenn Williams
- Mutt Williams
- Otto Williams
- Rip Williams
- Stan Williams
- Josh Willingham
- Carl Willis
- Archie Wilson
- Bobby Wilson
- Highball Wilson
- Jack Wilson
- John Wilson
- Max Wilson
- Tack Wilson
- Tom Wilson
- Willy Wilson
- Alex Wimmers
- Josh Winder
- Ed Wineapple
- Dave Winfield
- Ted Wingfield
- Jim Winn
- Matt Wisler
- Roy Witherup
- Barney Wolfe
- Larry Wolfe
- Roger Wolff
- Harry Wolverton
- Ken Wood
- Hal Woodeshick
- Alvis Woods
- Simeon Woods Richardson
- Dick Woodson
- Frank Woodward
- Junior Wooten
- Vance Worley
- Al Worthington
- Taffy Wright
- Tom Wright
- Butch Wynegar
- Early Wynn
- Hank Wyse

== Y ==
- Rich Yett
- Earl Yingling
- Bill Yohe
- Eddie Yost
- Delmon Young
- Chief Youngblood

== Z ==
- Tom Zachary
- Geoff Zahn
- Paul Zahniser
- José Zardón
- Norm Zauchin
- Bill Zepp
- Jerry Zimmerman
- Bill Zinser
- Bill Zuber

== See also ==
- Category:Minnesota Twins players
- Category:Washington Senators (1901–1960) players
