= 1923 Washington Senators season =

1923 Washington Senators
- League: American League
- Ballpark: Griffith Stadium
- City: Washington, D.C.
- Record: 75–78 (.490)
- League place: 4th
- Owners: Clark Griffith and William Richardson
- Managers: Donie Bush

The 1923 Washington Senators won 75 games, lost 78, and finished in fourth place in the American League. They were managed by Donie Bush and played home games at Griffith Stadium.

== Regular season ==
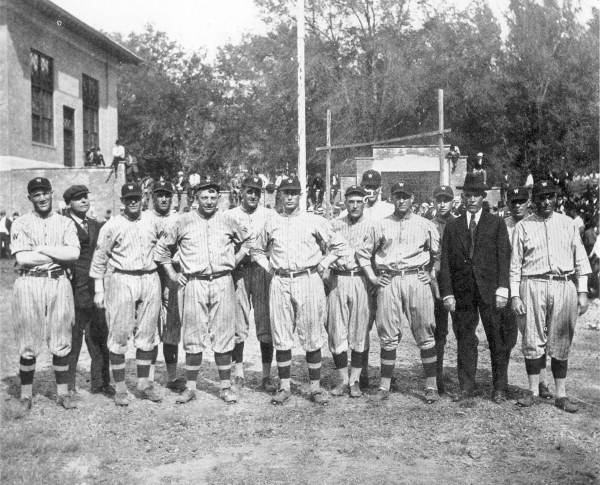
The 1923 Washington Senators team at Spring Training in DeLand, Florida.

=== Season standings ===
American League
Team	W	L	Pct.	GB	Home	Road
New York Yankees	98	54	.645	—	46‍–‍30	52‍–‍24
Detroit Tigers	83	71	.539	16	45‍–‍32	38‍–‍39
Cleveland Indians	82	71	.536	16½	42‍–‍36	40‍–‍35
Washington Senators	75	78	.490	23½	43‍–‍34	32‍–‍44
St. Louis Browns	74	78	.487	24	40‍–‍36	34‍–‍42
Philadelphia Athletics	69	83	.454	29	34‍–‍41	35‍–‍42
Chicago White Sox	69	85	.448	30	30‍–‍45	39‍–‍40
Boston Red Sox	61	91	.401	37	37‍–‍40	24‍–‍51

=== Record vs. opponents ===
1923 American League record Sources:
Team	BOS	CWS	CLE	DET	NYY	PHA	SLB	WSH
Boston	—	9–13	10–12	10–12–1	8–14	13–7	4–18–1	7–15
Chicago	13–9	—	9–13	9–13	7–15	10–12	11–11–1	10–12–1
Cleveland	12–10	13–9	—	9–13	12–10	12–10	14–8	10–11
Detroit	12–10–1	13–9	13–9	—	10–12	12–10	12–10	11–11
New York	14–8	15–7	10–12	12–10	—	16–6	15–5	16–6
Philadelphia	7–13	12–10	10–12	10–12	6–16	—	9–13	15–7–1
St. Louis	18–4–1	11–11–1	8–14	10–12	5–15	13–9	—	9–13
Washington	15–7	12–10–1	11–10	11–11	6–16	7–15–1	13–9	—

=== Roster ===
1923 Washington Senators
Roster
Pitchers: Jim Brillheart; Skipper Friday; Bonnie Hollingsworth; Walter Johnson; Firpo Marberry; Slim McGrew; Monroe Mitchell; George Mogridge; Squire Potter; Clay Roe; Allen Russell; Fred Schemanske; Duke Sedgwick; Cy Warmoth; Ted Wingfield; Tom Zachary; Paul Zahniser	Catchers: Patsy Gharrity; Muddy Ruel; Infielders: Ossie Bluege; Donie Bush; Bill Conroy; Pinky Hargrave; Bucky Harris; Joe Judge; Bobby Murray; Jim O'Neill; Roger Peckinpaugh; Doc Prothro; Jim Riley	Outfielders: Joe Evans; Showboat Fisher; Goose Goslin; Nemo Leibold; Sam Rice; Carr Smith; Rip Wade; Other batters: Pete Lapan; Jake Propst	Manager: Donie Bush

== Player stats ==
=== Batting ===
==== Starters by position ====
Note: Pos = Position; G = Games played; AB = At bats; H = Hits; Avg. = Batting average; HR = Home runs; RBI = Runs batted in

Pos	Player	G	AB	H	Avg.	HR	RBI
C	Muddy Ruel	136	449	142	.316	0	54
1B	Joe Judge	113	405	127	.314	2	63
2B	Bucky Harris	145	532	150	.282	2	70
SS	Roger Peckinpaugh	154	568	150	.264	2	62
3B	Ossie Bluege	109	379	93	.245	2	42
OF	Goose Goslin	150	600	180	.300	9	99
OF	Nemo Leibold	95	315	96	.305	1	22
OF	Sam Rice	148	595	188	.316	3	75

==== Other batters ====
Note: G = Games played; AB = At bats; H = Hits; Avg. = Batting average; HR = Home runs; RBI = Runs batted in

Player	G	AB	H	Avg.	HR	RBI
Joe Evans	106	372	98	.263	0	38
Patsy Gharrity	93	251	52	.207	3	33
Rip Wade	33	69	16	.232	2	14
Bill Conroy	18	60	8	.133	0	2
Pinky Hargrave	33	59	17	.288	0	8
Bobby Murray	10	37	7	.189	0	2
Jim O'Neill	23	33	9	.273	0	3
Showboat Fisher	13	23	6	.261	0	2
Donie Bush	10	22	9	.409	0	0
Carr Smith	5	9	1	.111	0	1
Doc Prothro	6	8	2	.250	0	3
Jim Riley	2	3	0	.000	0	0
Pete Lapan	2	2	0	.000	0	0
Jake Propst	1	1	0	.000	0	0

=== Pitching ===
==== Starting pitchers ====
Note: G = Games pitched; IP = Innings pitched; W = Wins; L = Losses; ERA = Earned run average; SO = Strikeouts

Player	G	IP	W	L	ERA	SO
Walter Johnson	42	261.0	17	12	3.48	130
George Mogridge	33	211.0	13	13	3.11	62
Tom Zachary	35	204.1	10	16	4.49	40
Clay Roe	1	1.2	0	1	0.00	2

==== Other pitchers ====
Note: G = Games pitched; IP = Innings pitched; W = Wins; L = Losses; ERA = Earned run average; SO = Strikeouts

Player	G	IP	W	L	ERA	SO
Paul Zahniser	33	177.0	9	10	3.86	52
Cy Warmoth	21	105.0	7	5	4.29	45
Bonnie Hollingsworth	17	72.2	3	7	4.09	26
Firpo Marberry	11	44.2	4	0	2.82	18
Monroe Mitchell	10	41.2	2	4	6.48	8
Skipper Friday	7	30.0	0	1	6.90	9
Duke Sedgwick	5	16.0	0	1	7.88	4

==== Relief pitchers ====
Note: G = Games pitched; W = Wins; L = Losses; SV = Saves; ERA = Earned run average; SO = Strikeouts

Player	G	W	L	SV	ERA	SO
Allen Russell	52	10	7	9	3.03	67
Jim Brillheart	12	0	1	0	7.00	8
Slim McGrew	3	0	0	0	12.60	1
Squire Potter	1	0	0	0	21.00	1
Ted Wingfield	1	0	0	0	0.00	1
Fred Schemanske	1	0	0	0	27.00	0
