= 1922 Washington Senators season =

1922 Washington Senators
- League: American League
- Ballpark: Griffith Stadium
- City: Washington, D.C.
- Record: 69–85 (.448)
- League place: 6th
- Owners: Clark Griffith and William Richardson
- Managers: Clyde Milan

The 1922 Washington Senators won 69 games, lost 85, and finished in sixth place in the American League. They were managed by Clyde Milan and played home games at Griffith Stadium.

== Regular season ==
=== Season standings ===
American League
Team	W	L	Pct.	GB	Home	Road
New York Yankees	94	60	.610	—	50‍–‍27	44‍–‍33
St. Louis Browns	93	61	.604	1	54‍–‍23	39‍–‍38
Detroit Tigers	79	75	.513	15	43‍–‍34	36‍–‍41
Cleveland Indians	78	76	.506	16	44‍–‍35	34‍–‍41
Chicago White Sox	77	77	.500	17	43‍–‍34	34‍–‍43
Washington Senators	69	85	.448	25	40‍–‍39	29‍–‍46
Philadelphia Athletics	65	89	.422	29	38‍–‍39	27‍–‍50
Boston Red Sox	61	93	.396	33	31‍–‍42	30‍–‍51

=== Record vs. opponents ===
1922 American League record Sources:
Team	BOS	CWS	CLE	DET	NYY	PHA	SLB	WSH
Boston	—	10–12	6–16	5–17	13–9	10–12	7–15	10–12
Chicago	12–10	—	12–10–1	17–5	9–13	12–10	8–14	7–15
Cleveland	16–6	10–12–1	—	15–7	7–15	11–11	6–16	13–9
Detroit	17–5	5–17	7–15	—	11–11	16–6–1	9–13	14–8
New York	9–13	13–9	15–7	11–11	—	17–5	14–8	15–7
Philadelphia	12–10	10–12	11–11	6–16–1	5–17	—	9–13	12–10
St. Louis	15–7	14–8	16–6	13–9	8–14	13–9	—	14–8
Washington	12–10	15–7	9–13	8–14	7–15	10–12	8–14	—

=== Roster ===
1922 Washington Senators
Roster
Pitchers: Jim Brillheart; Harry Courtney; Eric Erickson; Ray Francis; Joe Gleason; Walter Johnson; Slim McGrew; George Mogridge; Tom Phillips; Lucas Turk; Cy Warmoth; Frank Woodward; Chief Youngblood; Tom Zachary	Catchers: Patsy Gharrity; Pete Lapan; Val Picinich; Ricardo Torres; Infielders: Ossie Bluege; Donie Bush; Bucky Harris; Joe Judge; Bobby LaMotte; Roger Peckinpaugh; Howie Shanks	Outfielders: Frank Brower; Ed Goebel; Goose Goslin; George McNamara; Clyde Milan; Sam Rice; Earl Smith	Manager: Clyde Milan

== Player stats ==
=== Batting ===
==== Starters by position ====
Note: Pos = Position; G = Games played; AB = At bats; H = Hits; Avg. = Batting average; HR = Home runs; RBI = Runs batted in

Pos	Player	G	AB	H	Avg.	HR	RBI
C	Patsy Gharrity	96	273	70	.256	5	45
1B	Joe Judge	148	591	174	.294	10	81
2B	Bucky Harris	154	602	162	.269	2	40
SS	Roger Peckinpaugh	147	520	132	.254	2	48
3B	Bobby LaMotte	68	214	54	.252	1	23
OF	Goose Goslin	101	358	116	.324	3	53
OF	Frank Brower	139	471	138	.293	9	71
OF	Sam Rice	154	633	187	.295	6	69

==== Other batters ====
Note: G = Games played; AB = At bats; H = Hits; Avg. = Batting average; HR = Home runs; RBI = Runs batted in

Player	G	AB	H	Avg.	HR	RBI
Howie Shanks	84	272	77	.283	1	32
Val Picinich	76	210	48	.229	0	19
Earl Smith	65	205	53	.259	1	23
Donie Bush	41	134	32	.239	0	7
Clyde Milan	42	74	17	.230	0	5
Ossie Bluege	19	61	12	.197	0	2
Ed Goebel	37	59	16	.271	1	3
Pete Lapan	11	34	11	.324	1	6
George McNamara	3	11	3	.273	0	1
Ricardo Torres	4	4	0	.000	0	0

=== Pitching ===
==== Starting pitchers ====
Note: G = Games pitched; IP = Innings pitched; W = Wins; L = Losses; ERA = Earned run average; SO = Strikeouts

Player	G	IP	W	L	ERA	SO
Walter Johnson	41	280.0	15	16	2.99	105
George Mogridge	34	251.2	18	13	3.58	61
Ray Francis	39	225.0	7	18	4.28	64
Tom Zachary	32	184.2	15	10	3.12	37

==== Other pitchers ====
Note: G = Games pitched; IP = Innings pitched; W = Wins; L = Losses; ERA = Earned run average; SO = Strikeouts

Player	G	IP	W	L	ERA	SO
Eric Erickson	30	141.2	4	12	4.96	61
Jim Brillheart	31	119.2	4	6	3.61	47
Tom Phillips	17	70.0	3	7	4.89	19
Joe Gleason	8	40.2	2	3	4.65	12
Cy Warmoth	5	19.0	1	0	1.42	8

==== Relief pitchers ====
Note: G = Games pitched; W = Wins; L = Losses; SV = Saves; ERA = Earned run average; SO = Strikeouts

Player	G	W	L	SV	ERA	SO
Lucas Turk	5	0	0	0	6.94	1
Harry Courtney	5	0	1	0	3.60	4
Chief Youngblood	2	0	0	0	14.54	0
Frank Woodward	1	0	0	0	11.57	2
Slim McGrew	1	0	0	0	10.80	1
