= Jon Shave =

Jon Shave may refer to:

- Jon Shave (baseball)
- Jon Shave (musician)
