= Bobby Murray =

Bobby Murray may refer to:

- Bobby Murray (baseball) (1898–1979), baseball player
- Bobby Murray (musician) (1953–2026), American electric blues guitarist, songwriter and record producer
