= Roy Dietzel =

American baseball player (1931–2018)

- Second baseman
- Born: January 9, 1931; Baltimore, Maryland, U.S.
- Died: February 3, 2018 (aged 87); Charlotte, North Carolina, U.S.
- Batted: Right Threw: Right

MLB debut
- September 2, 1954, for the Washington Senators

Last MLB appearance
- September 24, 1954, for the Washington Senators

MLB statistics
- At bats: 21
- RBI: 1
- Batting average: .238
- Stats at Baseball Reference

Teams
- Washington Senators (1954)

Leroy Louis Dietzel (January 9, 1931 – February 3, 2018) was an American professional baseball player who played nine Major League games in 1954. A second baseman and third baseman, Dietzel was listed at 6 feet (1.8 m) tall and 190 pounds (86 kg), and threw and batted right-handed. He was born in Baltimore, Maryland.

Signed as an amateur free agent in 1950, Dietzel spent five seasons in the minor leagues prior to playing his first MLB game with the Washington Senators.

In his debut, Dietzel started at second base and collected two hits with an RBI in four at bats, as the Senators defeated the Detroit Tigers, 16–6.

Overall, Dietzel went 5-for-21 in nine games, driving in one run and scoring one without extrabases. Afterwards, he returned to the minors for two more seasons before retiring in 1956.

Dietzel died in 2018 in Charlotte, North Carolina, at the age of 87.
