= Steve Korcheck =

American baseball player (1932–2016)

- Catcher
- Born: August 11, 1932; Fayette County, Pennsylvania, U.S.
- Died: August 26, 2016 (aged 84); Bradenton, Florida, U.S.
- Batted: Right Threw: Right

MLB debut
- September 6, 1954, for the Washington Senators

Last MLB appearance
- September 27, 1959, for the Washington Senators

MLB statistics
- Batting average: .159
- Home runs: 0
- Runs batted in: 7
- Stats at Baseball Reference

Teams
- Washington Senators (1954–1955, 1958–1959)

Stephen Joseph Korcheck (August 11, 1932 – August 26, 2016) was an American professional baseball player. A catcher, he appeared in 58 games over four seasons (1954–1955; 1958–59) for the Washington Senators of Major League Baseball. Korcheck batted and threw right-handed, stood 6 feet 1 inch (1.85 m) tall and weighed 205 pounds (93 kg).

He joined the Senators from nearby George Washington University, where he starred in baseball and football. Drafted by the San Francisco 49ers of the National Football League in 1954 (third round, 35th overall selection), he chose a career in baseball instead. Interrupted by military service that cost him the 1956 and 1957 seasons, that career lasted for five seasons, concluding in 1960. All told, Korcheck batted .159 in 153 MLB at bats, with 23 hits, including six doubles and one triple.

From 1980 to 1997, Korcheck served as president of State College of Florida, Manatee–Sarasota.

He received a distinguished alumni achievement award from GWU in 1993.

== See also ==
- 1954 National Football League Draft
