= George McNamara (baseball) =

American baseball player (1901-1990)

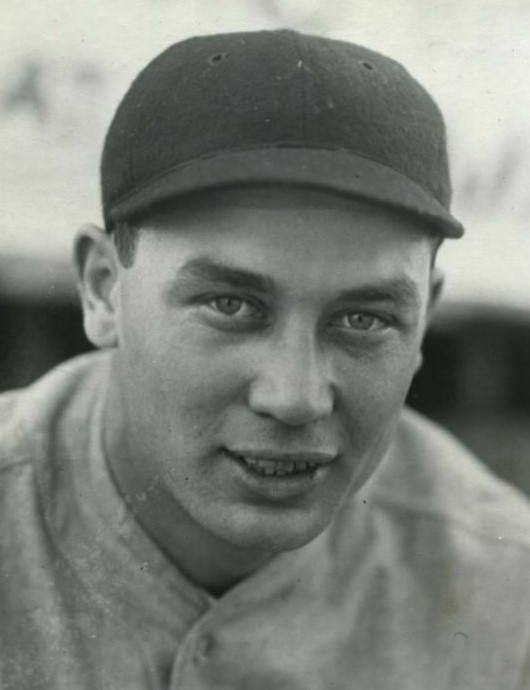
- Outfielder
- Born: January 11, 1901; Chicago, Illinois
- Died: June 12, 1990 (aged 89); Hinsdale, Illinois
- Batted: Left Threw: Right

MLB debut
- September 28, 1922, for the Washington Senators

Last MLB appearance
- September 29, 1922, for the Washington Senators

MLB statistics
- Games played: 3
- At bats: 11
- Hits: 3

Teams
- Washington Senators (1922)

George Francis McNamara (January 11, 1901 – June 12, 1990) was a backup right fielder in Major League Baseball who played briefly for the Washington Senators during the 1922 season. Listed at 6' 0", 175 lb., McNamara batted left-handed and threw right-handed. He was born in Chicago.

In a three-game career, McNamara was a .273 batting average hitter (3-for-11) with one RBI and a .333 on-base percentage. As an outfielder, he posted a 1.000 fielding percentage in three errorless chances.

McNamara died in Hinsdale, Illinois, at the age of 89.

== See also ==
- 1922 Washington Senators season
