= Herman Hill =

American baseball player (1945–1970)

- Center fielder/Pinch runner
- Born: October 12, 1945; Tuskegee, Alabama, U.S.
- Died: December 14, 1970 (aged 25); Puerto Cabello, Venezuela
- Batted: Left Threw: Right

MLB debut
- September 2, 1969, for the Minnesota Twins

Last MLB appearance
- October 1, 1970, for the Minnesota Twins

MLB statistics
- Batting average: .083
- Runs scored: 12
- Hits: 2
- Stats at Baseball Reference

Teams
- Minnesota Twins (1969–1970)

Herman Alexander Hill (October 12, 1945 – December 14, 1970) was an American professional baseball player, an outfielder who appeared in 43 Major League games for the 1969–1970 Minnesota Twins. Hill drowned while swimming in the Caribbean Sea off the coast of Venezuela during the 1970 winter baseball season.

Born to Charles and Milobelia Hill in Tuskegee, Alabama, Hill was one of the couple's 15 children. He grew up in Farmingdale, New Jersey, and graduated from Southern Freehold High School (since renamed as Howell High School).

Hill threw right-handed, batted left-handed, stood 6 feet 2 inches (1.88 m) tall and weighed 190 pounds (86 kg). Scouted by future major league manager and executive Jack McKeon, he signed with the Twins in 1966 and rose through their farm system. Hill was described in March 1969 by Baseball Digest as a "Good prospect. Has hustle, desire, determination. Speedy baserunner and hits with power." After batting .300 with 31 stolen bases in 1969 for the Denver Bears of the Triple-A American Association, Hill was recalled that September. He served as a pinch runner in his first 11 MLB appearances before Twins' manager Billy Martin used him as a pinch hitter and backup center fielder. He went hitless in two at bats and scored four runs.

In 1970, he split the season between the Triple-A Evansville Triplets and Minnesota, appearing in 27 MLB games in June, July and September. On June 29 at Metropolitan Stadium, Hill started in center field and collected his first two Major League hits, both singles off Dick Drago of the Kansas City Royals. Hill also scored two runs in a 5–4 Minnesota victory. Hill started again the next day, but was hitless in five at bats and the remainder of his MLB career was a pinch runner, pinch hitter or late-inning defensive replacement. During his Minnesota career, Hill batted 24 times with two hits (both on June 29, 1970), no runs batted in, one stolen base and two caught stealings. He scored 12 runs.

After being traded to the St. Louis Cardinals in October 1970, Hill played winter baseball in Venezuela. He drowned while swimming near Puerto Cabello at age 25.

== See also ==
- List of baseball players who died during their careers
