= Ed Fitz Gerald =

American baseball player and coach (1924–2020)

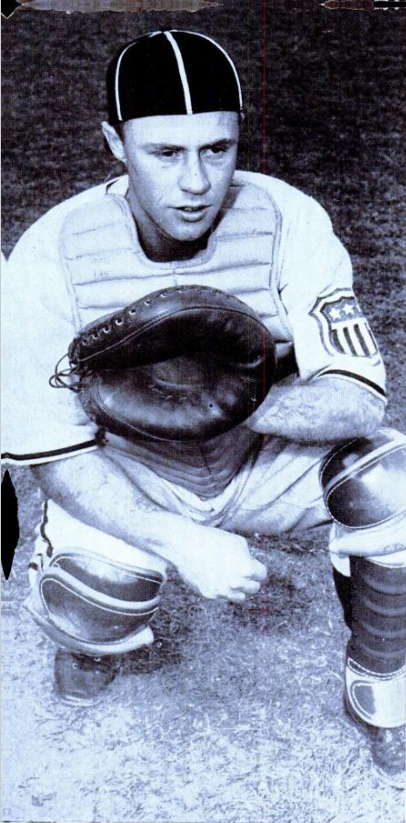
- Fitz Gerald in 1948
- Catcher
- Born: May 21, 1924; Santa Ynez, California, U.S.
- Died: June 14, 2020 (aged 96); Citrus Heights, California, U.S.
- Batted: Right Threw: Right

MLB debut
- April 19, 1948, for the Pittsburgh Pirates

Last MLB appearance
- September 15, 1959, for the Cleveland Indians

MLB statistics
- Batting average: .260
- Home runs: 19
- Runs batted in: 217
- Stats at Baseball Reference

Teams
- Pittsburgh Pirates (1948–1953); Washington Senators (1953–1959); Cleveland Indians (1959)

Edward Raymond Fitz Gerald (May 21, 1924 – June 14, 2020) was an American professional baseball player and coach. A former catcher, he appeared in 807 games played in Major League Baseball over 12 seasons (1948–1959) for the Pittsburgh Pirates, Washington Senators and Cleveland Indians. Fitz Gerald attended Saint Mary's College of California and served in the United States Army in the European Theater of Operations in World War II before beginning his professional career in 1946.

Fitz Gerald threw and batted right-handed, stood 6 feet (1.8 m) tall and weighed 170 pounds (77 kg) during his playing days. Used primarily in a backup role throughout his career, he exceeded 100 games played as a rookie with the 1948 Pirates (102 games), and again with the 1954 Senators (115). Fitz Gerald ended his career with a .260 batting average, 82 doubles, ten triples, 19 home runs, 217 runs batted in and 542 hits.

While with the Pirates, Fitz Gerald caught Cliff Chambers' no-hitter on May 6, 1951. As a Washington Senator, he also broke up Chicago White Sox pitcher Billy Pierce's bid for a perfect game on June 27, 1958 by doubling with two out in the ninth.

Following his retirement as an active player, Fitz Gerald coached in the American League from 1960–1964 for the Indians, Kansas City Athletics and Minnesota Twins, and briefly managed the Fresno Giants of the Class A California League.

He died on June 14, 2020.
