= Doc Prothro =

American baseball player and manager (1893–1971)

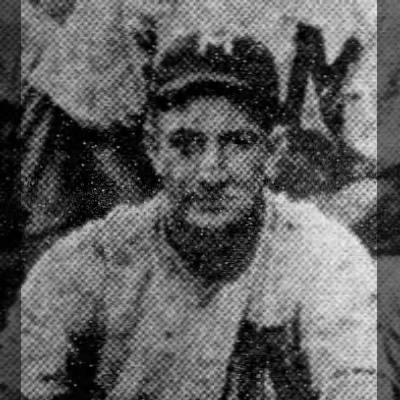
- Prothro with the Memphis Chicks in 1924
- Third baseman / Manager
- Born: July 16, 1893; Memphis, Tennessee, U.S.
- Died: October 14, 1971 (aged 78); Memphis, Tennessee, U.S.
- Batted: Right Threw: Right

MLB debut
- September 26, 1920, for the Washington Senators

Last MLB appearance
- September 24, 1926, for the Cincinnati Reds

MLB statistics
- Batting average: .318
- Home runs: 0
- Runs batted in: 81
- Managerial record: 138–320
- Winning %: .301
- Stats at Baseball Reference

Teams
- As player: Washington Senators (1920, 1923–1924); Boston Red Sox (1925); Cincinnati Reds (1926); As manager: Philadelphia Phillies (1939–1941)

James Thompson "Doc" Prothro Sr. (July 16, 1893 – October 14, 1971) was an American infielder and manager in Major League Baseball (MLB). Prothro was so nicknamed because he was a practicing dentist before signing his first professional baseball contract at age 26. After playing five seasons in MLB, Prothro became a manager, compiling what remains the worst career winning percentage among major league managers.

== Career ==
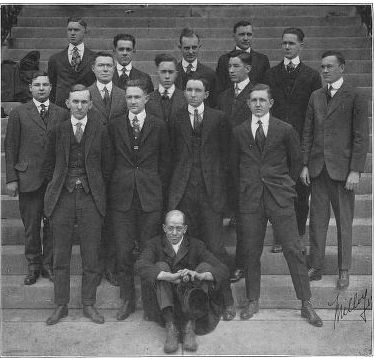
University of Tennessee Junior Dental class, 1917. Prothro is listed, but not identified, as being in the photo.

As a player, Prothro was discovered by baseball promoter Joe Engel, who managed the Chattanooga Lookouts at Engel Stadium. Prothro played in the major leagues as a right-handed hitting third baseman and shortstop for the Washington Senators, Boston Red Sox and Cincinnati Reds (1920; 1923–26), batting .318 with no home runs and 81 RBI in 180 games.

In 1928, Prothro became a manager in the Southern Association (SA), then one of the higher-level minor leagues, leading the Memphis Chicks and Little Rock Travelers to four SA pennants through 1938.

In 1939, Prothro replaced Jimmie Wilson as manager of the Philadelphia Phillies. In his three full seasons (1939–1941) at the helm of the Phillies, the club remained locked in the National League cellar — losers of 106, 103 and 111 games. Prothro's career mark of 138–320 has the lowest managerial winning percentage, .301, in major league history. (Note: The rankings include persons who managed at least 315 major league games.)

Prothro was fired after the 1941 season and replaced by Hans Lobert and thereafter returned to the Southern Association, where he piloted the Chicks from 1942 to 1947. After he retired as Memphis' manager, he remained active as a co-owner of the club.

== Personal life ==
A native of Memphis, Tennessee, Prothro attended the University of Tennessee Health Science Center. He died in Memphis in 1971 at the age of 78. His son, Tommy Prothro, became a successful coach in college football (at Oregon State University and UCLA) and, during the 1970s, led the Los Angeles Rams and San Diego Chargers of the National Football League.
