= Bill Conroy (infielder) =

American baseball player (1899-1970)

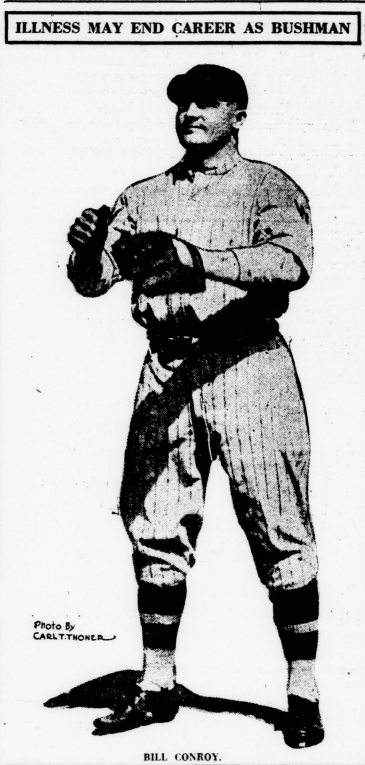
- Third baseman / First baseman
- Born: January 9, 1899; Chicago, Illinois, U.S.
- Died: January 23, 1970 (aged 71); Chicago, Illinois, U.S.
- Batted: Right Threw: Right

MLB debut
- April 18, 1923, for the Washington Senators

Last MLB appearance
- July 2, 1923, for the Washington Senators

MLB statistics
- Batting average: .133
- Home runs: 0
- Runs batted in: 2
- Stats at Baseball Reference

Teams
- Washington Senators (1923)

William Frederick Conroy (January 9, 1899 – January 23, 1970), nicknamed "Pep", was an American professional baseball player. He was an infielder for one season (1923) with the Washington Senators. For his career, he compiled a .133 batting average in 60 at-bats, with two runs batted in.

He was born and later died in Chicago at the age of 71.

Conroy was treated for an abscess or tumor at the base of his brain, first experienced in 1922. "The ruddy-faced, stockily built youngster reported to the training camp apparently in the best of health, said he felt well and showed sufficient ability in the exhibition games to earn the berth as regular at the far corner." He admitted to having headaches in spring training, but was eager to play in 1923.
