= Travis Baptist =

American baseball player (born 1971)

- Pitcher
- Born: December 30, 1971 (age 54); Forest Grove, Oregon, U.S.
- Batted: Left Threw: Left

MLB debut
- August 1, 1998, for the Minnesota Twins

Last MLB appearance
- September 23, 1998, for the Minnesota Twins

MLB statistics
- Win–loss record: 0–1
- Earned run average: 5.67
- Strikeouts: 11

CPBL statistics
- Win–loss record: 0–2
- Earned run average: 9.35
- Strikeouts: 6
- Stats at Baseball Reference

Teams
- Minnesota Twins (1998); Brother Elephants (2004)

Travis Steven Baptist (born December 30, 1971) is an American former professional baseball pitcher. He played in Major League Baseball (MLB) for the Minnesota Twins, and in the Chinese Professional Baseball League (CPBL) for the Brother Elephants.

== Career ==
Baptist was drafted by the Toronto Blue Jays in the 45th round of the 1990 Major League Baseball draft, and he played his first professional season with their Rookie league Medicine Hat Blue Jays in 1991. On December 9, 1996, he was drafted by the Minnesota Twins from the Blue Jays organization in the minor league portion of the 1996 Rule 5 draft. While Baptist was a member of the Salt Lake Buzz in 1998, he was chosen as the starting pitcher for the Pacific Coast League team in the Triple-A All Star game.

Baptist went on to later play his only season at the major league level with the Twins in 1998. He played his last season in affiliated ball in 2001 for the Chicago White Sox's Double-A Birmingham Barons and Triple-A Charlotte Knights, and his last professional season with the independent Central Baseball League's Rio Grande Valley WhiteWings in 2003.
