= Rip Wade =

American baseball player (1898–1957)

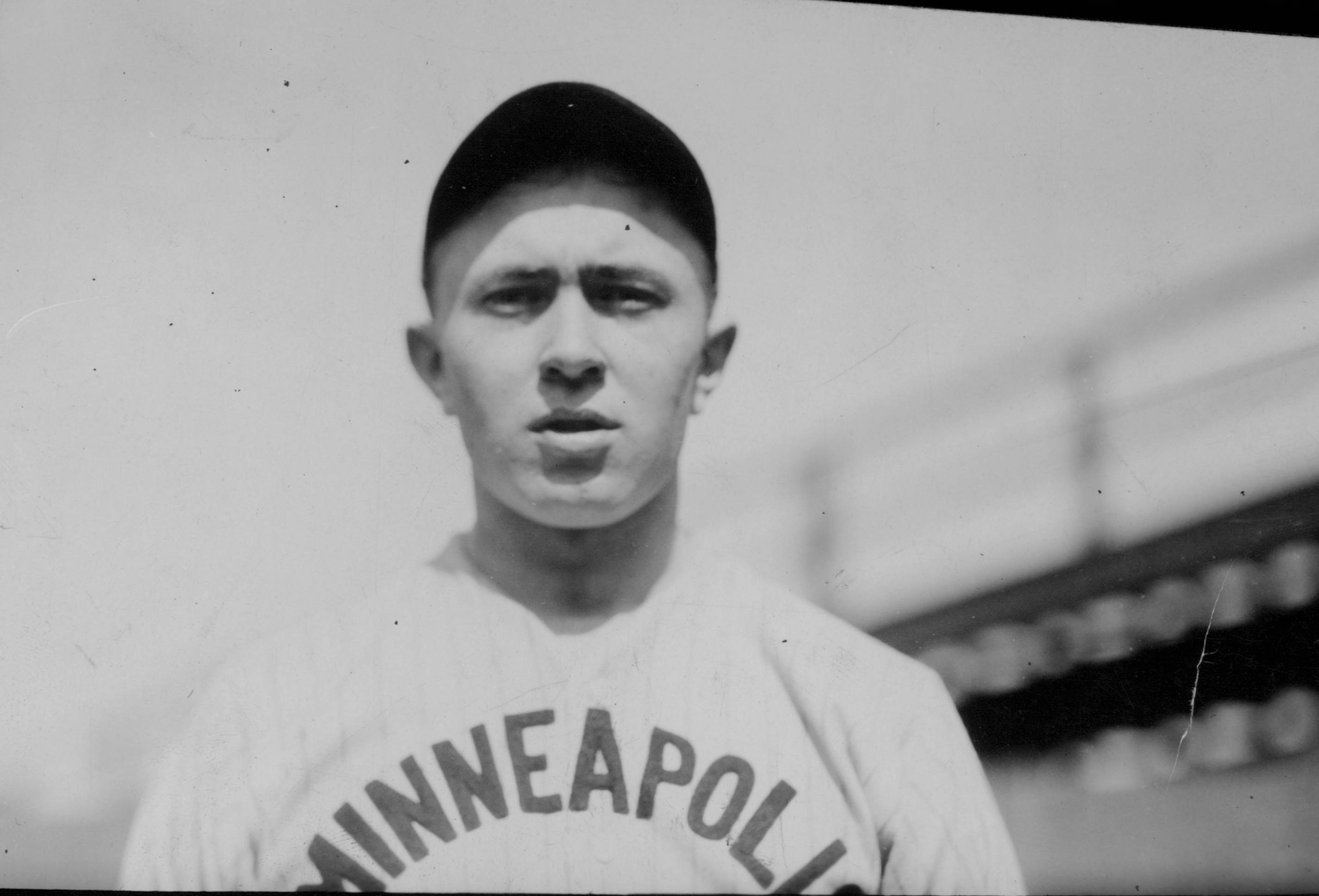
- Outfielder
- Born: January 12, 1898; Duluth, Minnesota, U.S.
- Died: June 15, 1957 (aged 59); Duluth, Minnesota, U.S.
- Batted: Left Threw: Right

MLB debut
- April 19, 1923, for the Washington Senators

Last MLB appearance
- October 4, 1923, for the Washington Senators

MLB statistics
- Batting average: .232
- Home runs: 2
- RBI: 14
- Stats at Baseball Reference

Teams
- Washington Senators (1923)

Richard Frank "Rip" Wade (January 12, 1898 – June 15, 1957) was an American professional baseball player for the Washington Senators in 1923 when he was 25 years of age. He batted left-handed and threw right-handed. He was 5' 11" in height and weighed 174 lb. He made his major league debut on April 19, 1923. His final game was on October 4, 1923.
