= Hal Haydel =

American baseball player (1944-2018)

- Pitcher
- Born: July 9, 1944; Houma, Louisiana, U.S.
- Died: September 12, 2018 (aged 74); Houma, Louisiana, U.S.
- Batted: Right Threw: Right

MLB debut
- September 7, 1970, for the Minnesota Twins

Last MLB appearance
- September 28, 1971, for the Minnesota Twins

MLB statistics
- Win–loss record: 6-2
- Earned run average: 4.04
- Strikeouts: 33
- Saves: 1
- Stats at Baseball Reference

Teams
- Minnesota Twins (1970–1971)

John Harold Haydel (July 9, 1944 - September 12, 2018) was an American professional baseball player who was a pitcher in Major League Baseball (MLB). Haydel signed with the Milwaukee Braves as a free agent in 1962. Later that year, he was drafted in the First-Year player draft by the Houston Colt .45s. The following year, he was traded along with Dick LeMay and Merritt Ranew to the Chicago Cubs for Dave Gerard and Danny Murphy. In 1966, Haydel was selected in the Minor League Draft by the San Francisco Giants. Three years later, he was drafted in the Rule 5 draft by the Minnesota Twins. During his time with the Twins, Haydel played at the Major League level in 1970 and 1971.

Haydel died September 12, 2018.
