= Jon Shave (baseball) =

American baseball player (born 1967)

- Infielder
- Born: November 4, 1967 (age 58); Waycross, Georgia, U.S.
- Batted: Right Threw: Right

MLB debut
- May 15, 1993, for the Texas Rangers

Last MLB appearance
- October 3, 1999, for the Texas Rangers

MLB statistics
- Batting average: .288
- Home runs: 1
- Runs batted in: 21
- Stats at Baseball Reference

Teams
- Texas Rangers (1993, 1999); Minnesota Twins (1998)

Jonathan Taylor Shave (born November 4, 1967) is an American former Major League infielder who played for the Texas Rangers and the Minnesota Twins.

Shave attended Mississippi State University. In 1989 he played collegiate summer baseball with the Falmouth Commodores of the Cape Cod Baseball League and was named a league all-star. He was selected by Texas in the 5th round of the 1990 MLB draft.
