= Jake Propst =

American baseball player (1895-1967)

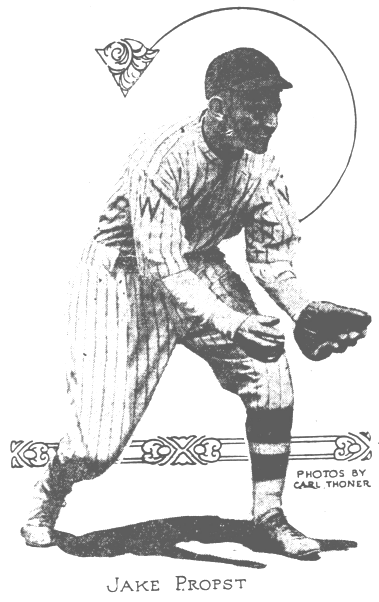
- Pinch hitter
- Born: March 10, 1895; Kennedy, Alabama
- Died: February 24, 1967 (aged 71); Columbus, Mississippi
- Batted: Left Threw: Right

MLB debut
- August 7, 1923, for the Washington Senators

Last MLB appearance
- August 7, 1923, for the Washington Senators

MLB statistics
- Games played: 1
- At bats: 1
- Hits: 0
- Stats at Baseball Reference

Teams
- Washington Senators (1923)

William Jacob Propst (March 10, 1895 – February 24, 1967) was a pinch hitter in Major League Baseball. He played for the Washington Senators.
