= Ray Francis =

American baseball player (1893–1934)

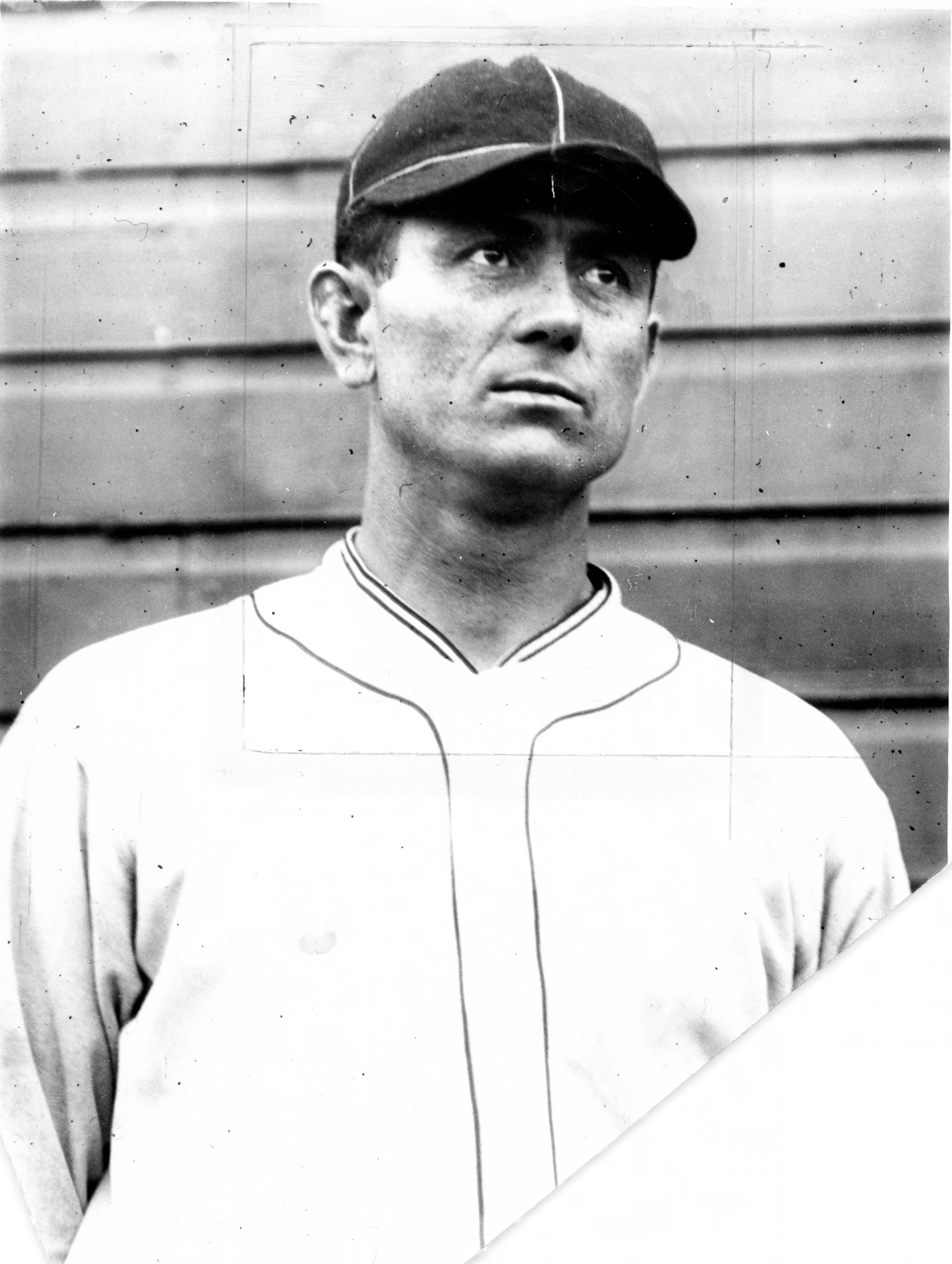
- Pitcher
- Born: March 8, 1893; Sherman, Texas, U.S.
- Died: July 6, 1934 (aged 41); Atlanta, Georgia, U.S.
- Batted: Left Threw: Left

MLB debut
- April 18, 1922, for the Washington Senators

Last MLB appearance
- June 10, 1925, for the Boston Red Sox

MLB statistics
- Win–loss record: 12–28
- Earned run average: 4.65
- Strikeouts: 96
- Stats at Baseball Reference

Teams
- Washington Senators (1922); Detroit Tigers (1923); New York Yankees (1925); Boston Red Sox (1925)

Ray James Francis (March 8, 1893 – July 6, 1934) was an American pitcher in Major League Baseball who played for the Washington Senators, Detroit Tigers, New York Yankees and Boston Red Sox in parts of three seasons spanning 1922–1925. Listed at 6 ft 1.5 in (1.87 m), 182 lb., Francis batted and threw left-handed. He was born in Sherman, Texas.

Francis worked for the Wells Fargo in Oklahoma before deciding to play baseball. He changed his name from Roy to Ray after a local sportswriter made a typo in a local newspaper.

Besides his major league stint, Francis played for several minor league clubs in many cities and different leagues, including the Beaumont Oilers, San Antonio Bronchos (TL, 1917), Seattle Rainiers (PCL, 1920–1921), Atlanta Crackers (SOUA, 1924; 1926–1928; 1930) Minneapolis Millers (AA, 1925–1926), Birmingham Barons (SOUA, 1928–1930), and Raleigh Capitals (PIED, 1931–1932).

Francis posted a 12–28 record and a 4.65 earned run average in 82 major league appearances (36 starts), including 15 complete games, two shutouts and 25 games finished, striking out 96 batters while walking 110 in 337.0 innings of work. In a 10-year minor league career, he went 109–87 with a 3.49 ERA in 298 games.

After retirement, Francis worked for the police department of Atlanta and was shot on duty. He died of a heart attack in 1934, at the age of 41, while breaking up a fight on duty. He is buried in Atlanta.
