= Pete Lapan =

American baseball player (1891–1953)

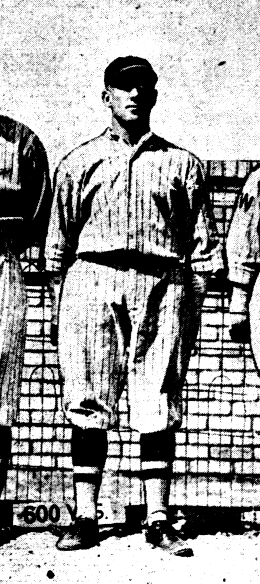
- Catcher
- Born: June 25, 1891; Easthampton, Massachusetts, U.S.
- Died: January 5, 1953 (aged 61); Norwalk, California, U.S.
- Batted: Right Threw: Right

MLB debut
- September 16, 1922, for the Washington Senators

Last MLB appearance
- May 3, 1923, for the Washington Senators

MLB statistics
- Batting average: .306
- Home runs: 1
- Runs batted in: 6
- Stats at Baseball Reference

Teams
- Washington Senators (1922–1923)

Peter Nelson Lapan (June 25, 1891 – January 5, 1953) was an American professional baseball player. He was a catcher over parts of two seasons (1922–23) with the Washington Senators. For his career, he compiled a .306 batting average and one home run in 40 at-bats, with six runs batted in.

He was born in Easthampton, Massachusetts and died in Norwalk, California at the age of 61.
