= Squire Potter =

American baseball player (1902–1983)

- Pitcher
- Born: March 18, 1902; Flatwoods, Kentucky, U.S.
- Died: January 27, 1983 (aged 80); Ashland, Kentucky, U.S.
- Batted: Right Threw: Right

MLB debut
- August 7, 1923, for the Washington Senators

Last MLB appearance
- August 7, 1923, for the Washington Senators

MLB statistics
- Games pitched: 1
- Innings pitched: 3
- Win–loss record: 0–0
- Earned run average: 21.00
- Strikeouts: 1
- Stats at Baseball Reference

Teams
- Washington Senators (1923)

Robert "Squire" Potter (March 18, 1902 – January 27, 1983) was an American Major League Baseball pitcher. Potter played in one game for the Washington Senators on August 7, 1923.

Entering the game in the 7th inning with the Senators trailing 3–1, Potter's first eight pitches were called balls, and he eventually finished the game yielding nine runs on eleven hits, four walks and a wild pitch in three innings of relief. The Senators lost the game 22–2. According to reporters covering the game, three Indians baserunners allowed themselves to be caught stealing, and one batter stretched a double into an out at third base.

Potter's brother, Dykes Potter, pitched for the Brooklyn Dodgers for 2 games in 1938.
