= Ted Wingfield =

American baseball player (1899–1975)

- Pitcher
- Born: August 7, 1899; Bedford, Virginia, U.S.
- Died: July 18, 1975 (aged 75); Johnson City, Tennessee, U.S.
- Batted: Right Threw: Right

MLB debut
- September 23, 1923, for the Washington Senators

Last MLB appearance
- August 27, 1927, for the Boston Red Sox

MLB statistics
- Win–loss record: 24–44
- Earned run average: 4.18
- Strikeouts: 68
- Stats at Baseball Reference

Teams
- Washington Senators (1923–1924); Boston Red Sox (1924–1927)

Frederick Davis "Ted" Wingfield (August 7, 1899 – July 18, 1975) was an American professional baseball pitcher. He played all or part of five seasons in Major League Baseball from 1923 through 1927 for the Washington Senators (1923–24) and Boston Red Sox (1924–27). Listed at 5 ft 11 in (1.80 m), 168 lb., Wingfield batted and threw right-handed. He was born in Bedford, Virginia.

In a five-season career, Wingfield posted a 24–44 record with a 4.18 ERA in 113 appearances, including 57 starts, 31 complete games, three shutouts, five saves, and 553.1 innings pitched. His best season statistically was 1925, when he posted career bests in wins (12), strikeouts (30), and innings pitched (254.1) while having an ERA of 3.96.

Wingfield was notable for an especially low rate of strikeouts as a pitcher. In 553 1/3 innings, he struck out only 68 batters, or 1.1 per 9 innings. In his final season, over 74 2/3 innings, he struck out a grand total of one batter. He struck out Chick Galloway, a good contact hitter, in a game in which Wingfield pitched poorly, allowing seven runs in three innings.

Wingfield died at the age of 75 in Johnson City, Tennessee.
