= Paul Zahniser =

American baseball player (1896–1964)

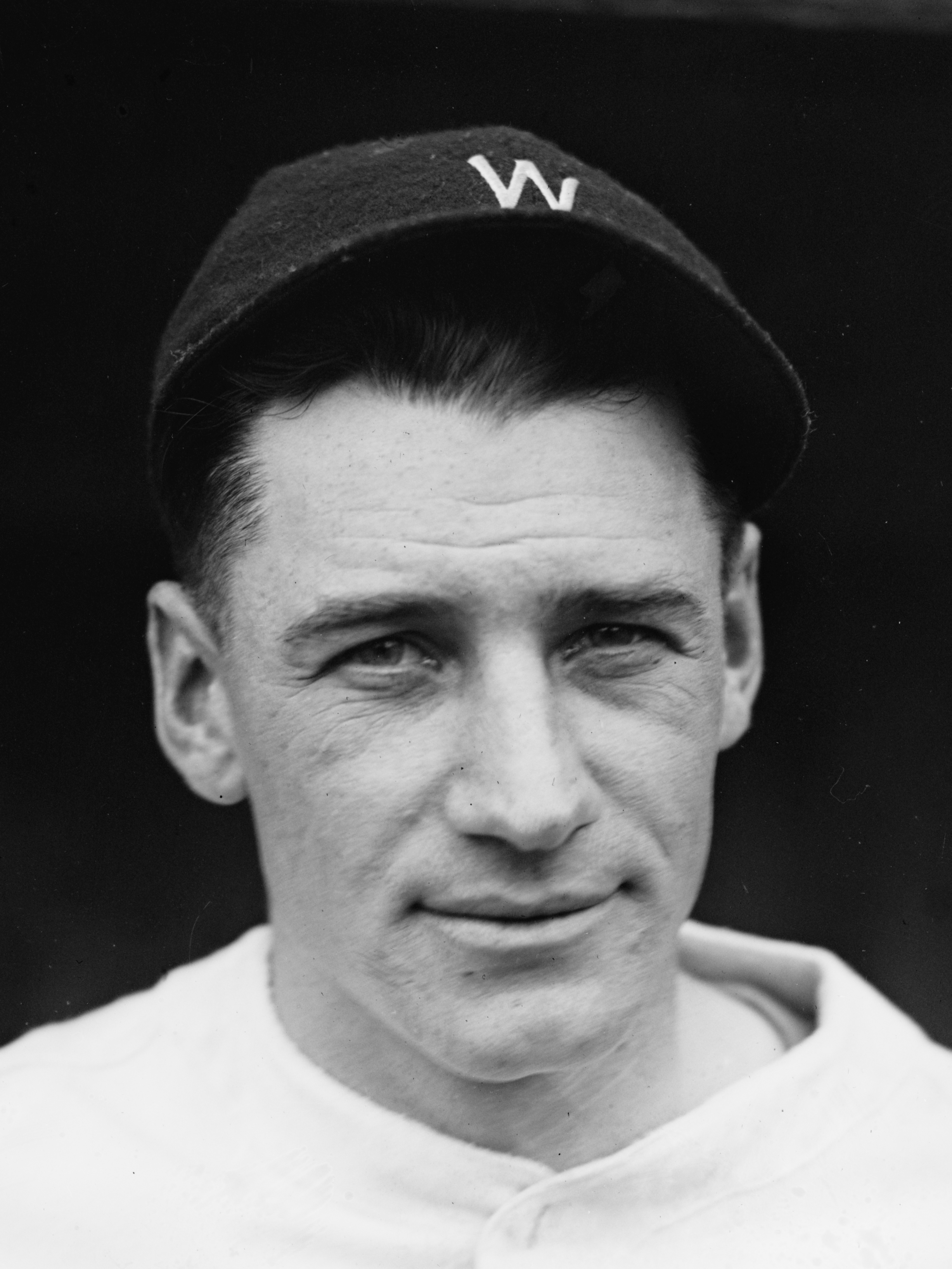
- Pitcher
- Born: September 6, 1896; Sac City, Iowa, U.S.
- Died: September 26, 1964 (aged 68); Klamath Falls, Oregon, U.S.
- Batted: Right Threw: Right

MLB debut
- May 18, 1923, for the Washington Senators

Last MLB appearance
- April 19, 1929, for the Cincinnati Reds

MLB statistics
- Win–loss record: 25–47
- Earned run average: 4.66
- Strikeouts: 145
- Stats at Baseball Reference

Teams
- Washington Senators (1923–1924); Boston Red Sox (1925–1926); Cincinnati Reds (1929)

Career highlights and awards
- World Series champion (1924)

Paul Vernon Zahniser (September 6, 1896 – September 26, 1964) was an American professional baseball pitcher. He played for three different teams over his five-season Major League Baseball career, which spanned from 1923 to 1929.

== Career ==
Born in Sac City, Iowa, Zahniser started his professional career in 1918 with the Toledo Iron Men, and later he consistently won 20 or more games while pitching in the Southern Association, including 15 straight during one stretch.

He made his major league debut with the Washington Senators in 1923, and pitched as both a starting pitcher and in relief. He had a 9–10 win–loss record that first season in 33 games pitched, with ten complete games in 21 games started. The following season, Zahniser's numbers were not nearly as good, but the Senators went on to claim the 1924 World Series title. He did not play in the World Series, and was traded before the 1925 season, along with Roy Carlyle, to the Boston Red Sox for Joe Harris.

Over the next two seasons for the Red Sox, his effectiveness consistently worsened. His ERA's were 5.15 and 4.97, and he led the American League in losses with 18 in 1926. An explanation of his inneffectiveness was offered by Babe Ruth in his book Babe Ruth's Own Book of Baseball. Ruth explained that Zahniser unknowingly altered his delivery, depending on which pitch he was going to throw, so the hitters knew which one was he was going to throw. Zahniser made a one-game re-appearance in the majors with the Cincinnati Reds, pitched one inning, and gave up three earned runs. He finished the season with the Toledo Mud Hens.

== Post-career ==
Zahniser died at the age of 68 of a self-inflicted gunshot in Klamath Falls, Oregon, and is interred at Oakland Cemetery in his hometown of Sac City.
