= Bobby Murray (baseball) =

American baseball player (1898-1979)

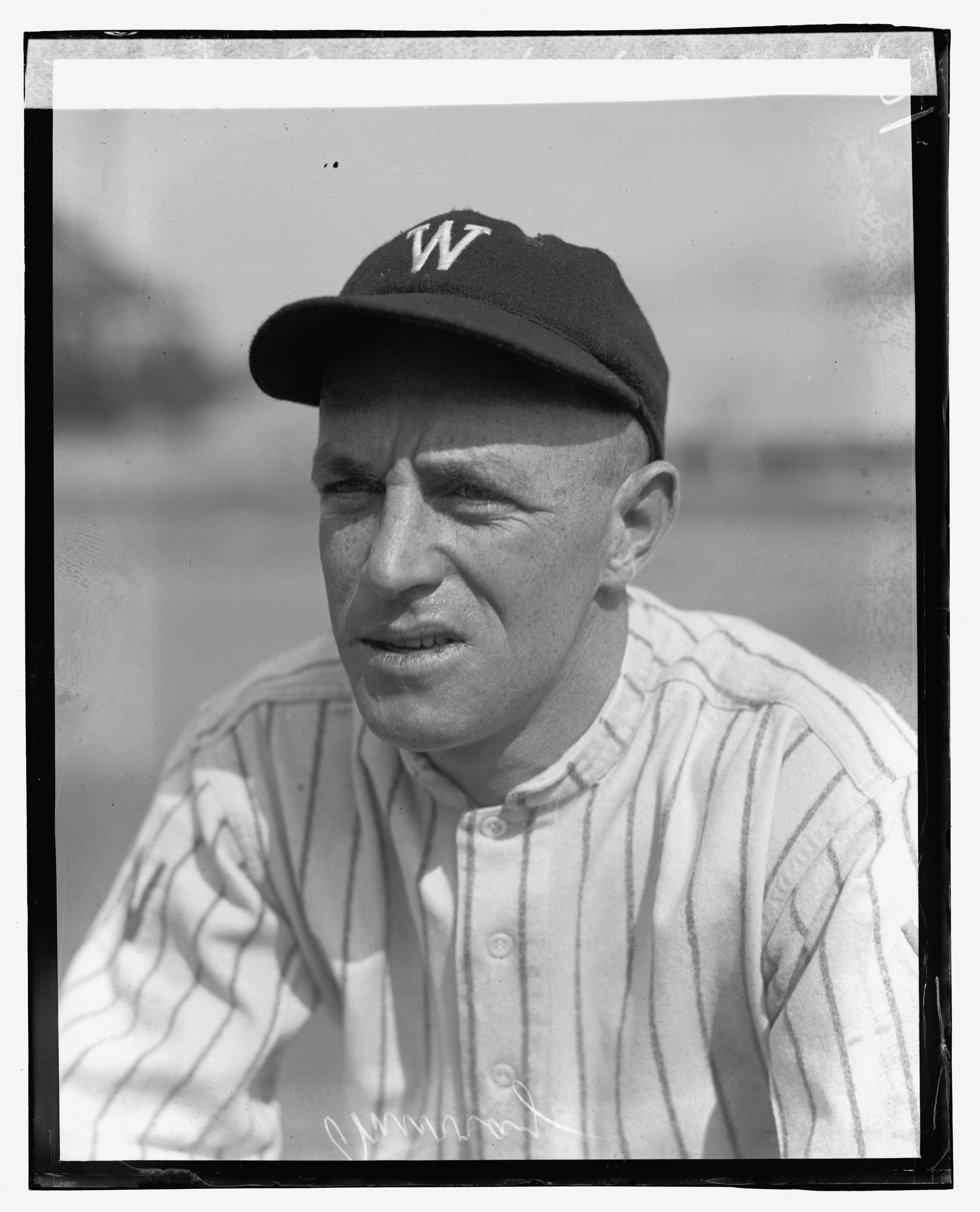
- Third baseman
- Born: April 4, 1898; St. Albans, Vermont, U.S.
- Died: January 4, 1979 (aged 80); Nashua, New Hampshire, U.S.
- Batted: Left Threw: Right

MLB debut
- September 24, 1923, for the Washington Senators

Last MLB appearance
- October 7, 1923, for the Washington Senators

MLB statistics
- Batting average: .189
- Home runs: 0
- Runs batted in: 2
- Stats at Baseball Reference

Teams
- Washington Senators (1923)

Robert Hayes Murray (July 4, 1898 – January 1, 1979) was an American professional baseball player. He was a third baseman for one season (1923) with the Washington Senators. For his career, he compiled a .189 batting average in 37 at-bats, with two runs batted in.

An alumnus of Norwich University, he was born in St. Albans, Vermont and later died in Nashua, New Hampshire at the age of 80.
