= Clay Roe =

American baseball player (1904-1956)

- Pitcher
- Born: January 7, 1904; Greenbrier, Tennessee
- Died: April 4, 1956 (aged 52); Cleveland, Mississippi
- Batted: Left Threw: Left

MLB debut
- October 3, 1923, for the Washington Senators

Last MLB appearance
- October 3, 1923, for the Washington Senators

MLB statistics
- Record: 0–1
- Earned run average: 0.00
- Strikeouts: 2

Teams
- Washington Senators (1923)

James Clay Roe (January 7, 1904 – April 4, 1956), nicknamed "Shad", was a Major League Baseball pitcher. Roe played for the Washington Senators in 1923. He batted and threw left-handed.

He was born in Greenbrier, Tennessee and died in Cleveland, Mississippi.
