= Fred Schemanske =

American baseball player (1903-1960)

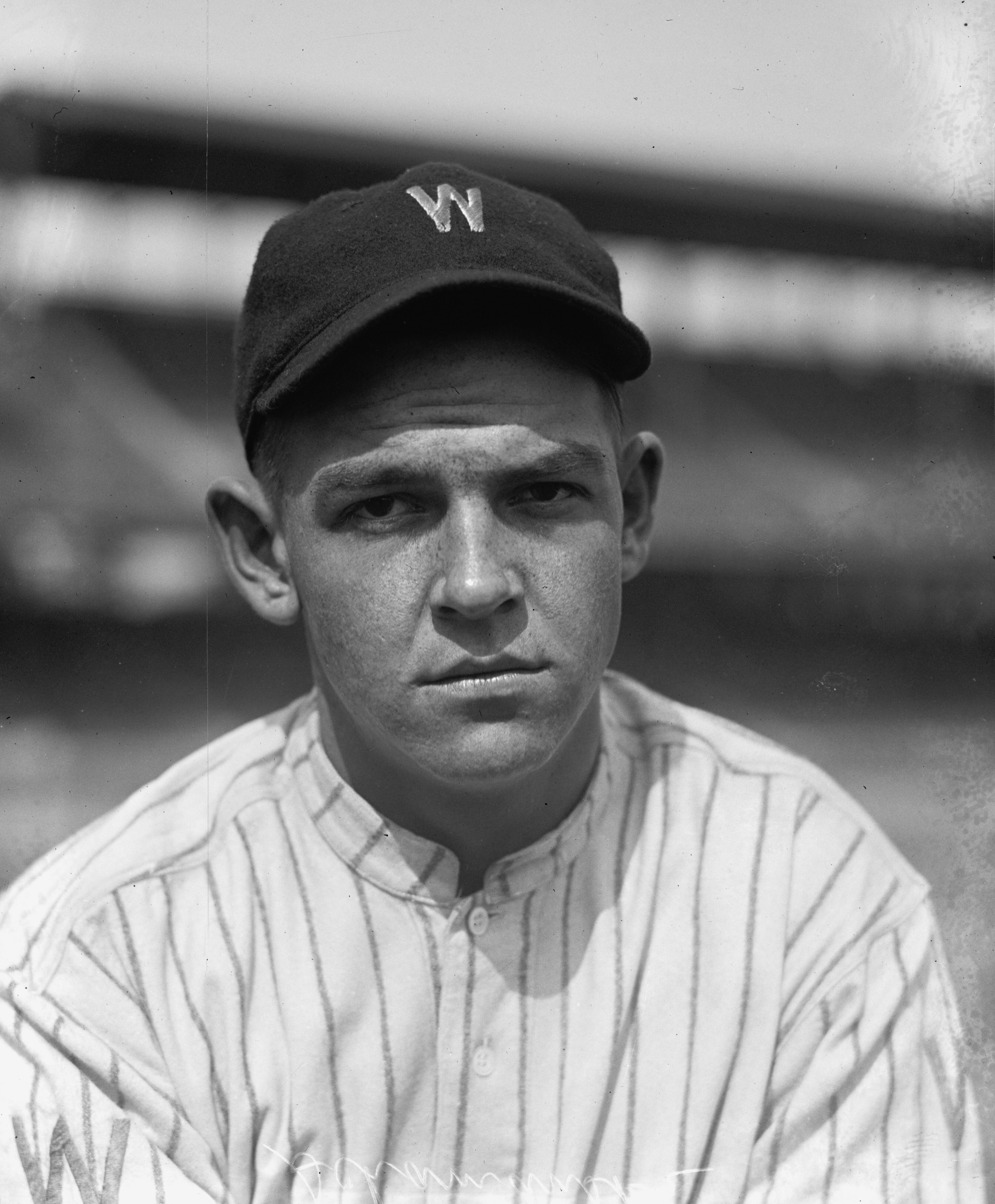
- Pitcher / Pinch hitter
- Born: April 28, 1903; Detroit, Michigan, U.S.
- Died: February 18, 1960 (aged 56); Detroit, Michigan, U.S.
- Batted: Right Threw: Right

MLB debut
- September 15, 1923, for the Washington Senators

Last MLB appearance
- October 3, 1923, for the Washington Senators

MLB statistics
- At bats: 2
- Hits: 2
- Earned run average: 27.00
- Stats at Baseball Reference

Teams
- Washington Senators (1923)

Frederick George Schemanske (April 28, 1903 – February 18, 1960), nicknamed "Buck", was an American Major League Baseball player who played for the Washington Senators in 1923. He played in two games, one as a pitcher and one as a pinch hitter.

Singles in his only two at-bats left Schemanske with a rare MLB career batting average of 1.000.
