= Skipper Friday =

American baseball player (1897–1962)

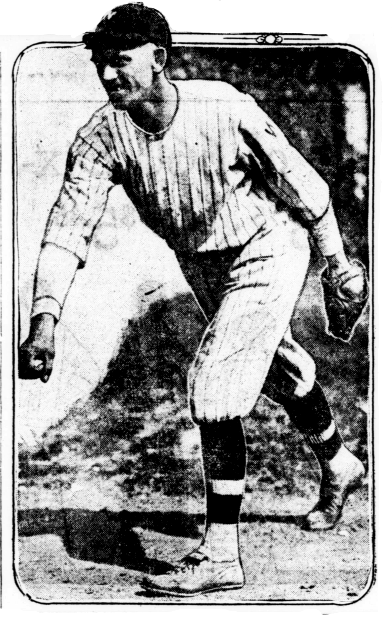
- Pitcher
- Born: October 26, 1897; Gastonia, North Carolina, U.S.
- Died: August 25, 1962 (aged 64); Gastonia, North Carolina, U.S.
- Batted: Right Threw: Right

MLB debut
- June 17, 1923, for the Washington Senators

Last MLB appearance
- August 7, 1923, for the Washington Senators

MLB statistics
- Win–loss record: 0-1
- Earned run average: 6.90
- Strikeouts: 9
- Stats at Baseball Reference

Teams
- Washington Senators (1923)

Grier William "Skipper" Friday (October 26, 1897 – August 25, 1962) was an American Major League Baseball pitcher who played for the Washington Senators in 1923.
