= Carr Smith =

American baseball player (1901-1989)

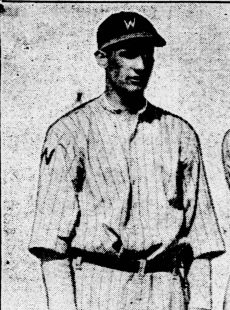
- Outfielder
- Born: April 8, 1901; Kernersville, North Carolina, U.S.
- Died: April 14, 1989 (aged 88); Miami, Florida, U.S.
- Batted: Right Threw: Right

MLB debut
- September 23, 1923, for the Washington Senators

Last MLB appearance
- June 9, 1924, for the Washington Senators

MLB statistics
- Games played: 10
- At bats: 19
- Hits: 3
- Stats at Baseball Reference

Teams
- Washington Senators (1923–24)

Emanuel Carr Smith (April 8, 1901 – April 14, 1989) was an American outfielder for the 1923 and 1924 Washington Senators.
