= Lucas Turk =

American baseball player (1898-1994)

- Pitcher
- Born: May 2, 1898; Homer, Georgia, U.S.
- Died: January 11, 1994 (aged 95); Homer, Georgia, U.S.
- Batted: Right Threw: Right

MLB debut
- June 7, 1922, for the Washington Senators

Last MLB appearance
- September 29, 1922, for the Washington Senators

MLB statistics
- Games played: 5
- Earned run average: 6.94
- Strikeouts: 1
- Stats at Baseball Reference

Teams
- Washington Senators (1922)

Lucas Newton "Chief" Turk (May 2, 1898 – January 11, 1994) was an American pitcher in Major League Baseball. He played for the Washington Senators in 1922.
