= Monroe Mitchell =

American baseball player (1901-1976)

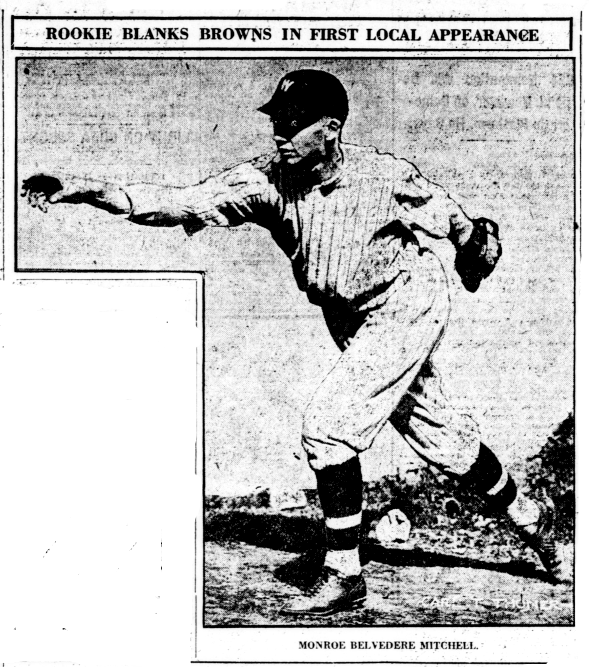
- Pitcher
- Born: September 11, 1901; Starkville, Mississippi
- Died: September 4, 1976 (aged 74); Valdosta, Georgia
- Batted: Right Threw: Left

MLB debut
- July 11, 1923, for the Washington Senators

Last MLB appearance
- August 29, 1923, for the Washington Senators

MLB statistics
- Win–loss record: 2–4
- Strikeouts: 8
- Earned run average: 6.48
- Stats at Baseball Reference

Teams
- Washington Senators (1923)

Monroe Barr Mitchell (September 11, 1901 in Starkville, Mississippi – September 4, 1976 in Valdosta, Georgia), was an American Major League Baseball pitcher. He appeared in 10 games for the Washington Senators in 1923.
