= Duke Sedgwick =

American baseball player (1898-1982)

- Pitcher
- Born: June 1, 1898; Martins Ferry, Ohio, U.S.
- Died: December 4, 1982 (aged 84); Clearwater, Florida, U.S.
- Batted: Right Threw: Right

MLB debut
- July 12, 1921, for the Philadelphia Phillies

Last MLB appearance
- July 31, 1923, for the Washington Senators

MLB statistics
- Win–loss record: 1-4
- Earned run average: 5.46
- Strikeouts: 25
- Stats at Baseball Reference

Teams
- Philadelphia Phillies (1921); Washington Senators (1923)

Henry Kenneth "Duke" Sedgwick (June 1, 1898 – December 4, 1982) was an American professional baseball player. He was a pitcher in Major League Baseball. He played for the Philadelphia Phillies and Washington Senators in the 1920s.

Sedgwick signed with the Phillies in July 1921 after being discovered playing amateur baseball in Washington, D.C.
