= Chief Youngblood =

American baseball player (1900-1968)

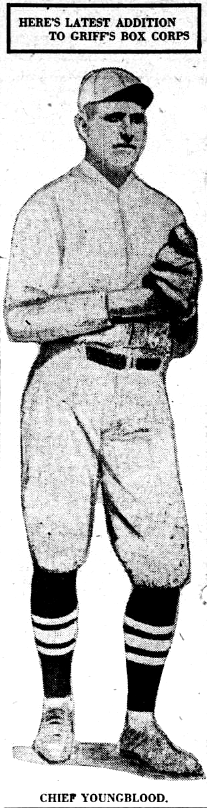
- Pitcher
- Born: June 13, 1900; Hillsboro, Texas
- Died: July 6, 1968 (aged 68); Amarillo, Texas
- Batted: Left Threw: Right

MLB debut
- June 16, 1922, for the Washington Senators

Last MLB appearance
- July 31, 1922, for the Washington Senators

MLB statistics
- Win–loss record: 0-0
- Earned run average: 14.54
- Strikeouts: 0
- Stats at Baseball Reference

Teams
- Washington Senators (1922)

Albert Clyde "Chief" Youngblood (June 13, 1900—July 6, 1968) was an American professional baseball player. A right-handed pitcher, his two-week career in Major League Baseball in 1922 lasted from July 16 to July 31. He batted left-handed.

A native of Hillsboro, Texas, Youngblood was nicknamed "Chief", an appellation used throughout his brief career. He was signed by the Washington Senators and remained with the team for 16 days. He later played minor league baseball from 1924 to 1926.

Youngblood died in Amarillo, Texas three weeks past his 68th birthday.
