= Cy Warmoth =

American baseball player (1893–1957)

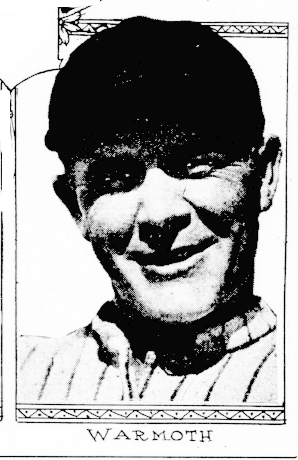
- Pitcher
- Born: February 2, 1893; Bone Gap, Illinois, U.S.
- Died: June 20, 1957 (aged 64); Mt. Carmel, Illinois, U.S.
- Batted: Left Threw: Left

MLB debut
- August 31, 1916, for the St. Louis Cardinals

Last MLB appearance
- October 3, 1923, for the Washington Senators

MLB statistics
- Win–loss record: 8–5
- Strikeouts: 54
- Earned run average: 4.26
- Stats at Baseball Reference

Teams
- St. Louis Cardinals (1916); Washington Senators (1922–1923)

Wallace Walter "Cy" Warmoth (February 2, 1893 – June 20, 1957) was an American Major League Baseball pitcher. He pitched parts of three seasons in the majors. Warmoth debuted in 1916 for the St. Louis Cardinals, then returned to the majors six years later for the Washington Senators, for whom he pitched in 1922 and 1923.

== Sources ==
- Career statistics from Baseball Reference · Baseball Reference (Minors) · Retrosheet · Baseball Almanac
