= Slim McGrew =

American baseball player

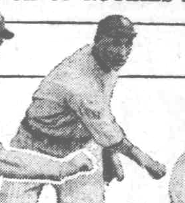
- Pitcher
- Born: August 5, 1899; Yoakum, Texas
- Died: August 21, 1967 (aged 68); Houston, Texas
- Batted: Right Threw: Right

MLB debut
- April 18, 1922, for the Washington Senators

Last MLB appearance
- June 8, 1924, for the Washington Senators

MLB statistics
- Win–loss record: 0–1
- Earned run average: 6.60
- Strikeouts: 10
- Stats at Baseball Reference

Teams
- Washington Senators (1922–1924)

Walter Howard "Slim" McGrew (August 5, 1899 – August 21, 1967) was a Major League Baseball pitcher. He played for the Washington Senators from 1922 to 1924.
