= Jim Brillheart =

American baseball player (1903–1972)

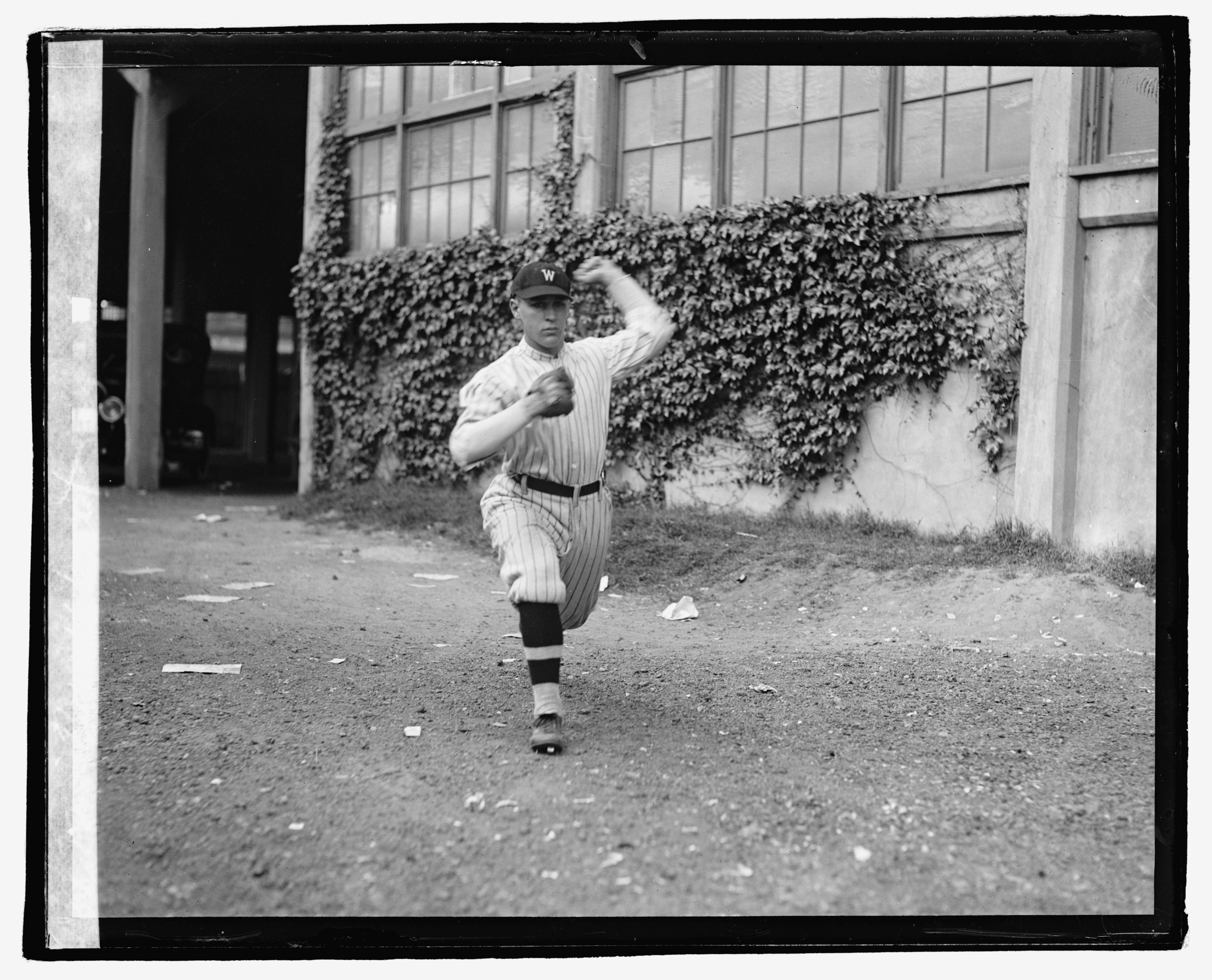
- Pitcher
- Born: September 28, 1903; Dublin, Virginia, U.S.
- Died: September 2, 1972 (aged 68); Radford, Virginia, U.S.
- Batted: Right Threw: Left

MLB debut
- April 17, 1922, for the Washington Senators

Last MLB appearance
- June 3, 1931, for the Boston Red Sox

MLB statistics
- Win–loss record: 8–9
- Earned run average: 4.19
- Strikeouts: 98
- Stats at Baseball Reference

Teams
- Washington Senators (1922–1923); Chicago Cubs (1927); Boston Red Sox (1931)

James Benson Brillheart (September 28, 1903 – September 2, 1972) was an American pitcher in Major League Baseball who played between 1922 and 1931 for the Washington Senators (1922–23), Chicago Cubs (1927) and Boston Red Sox (1931). He was also known as 'Buck', 'Lefty', or 'Benson'. Brillheart batted right-handed and threw left-handed.

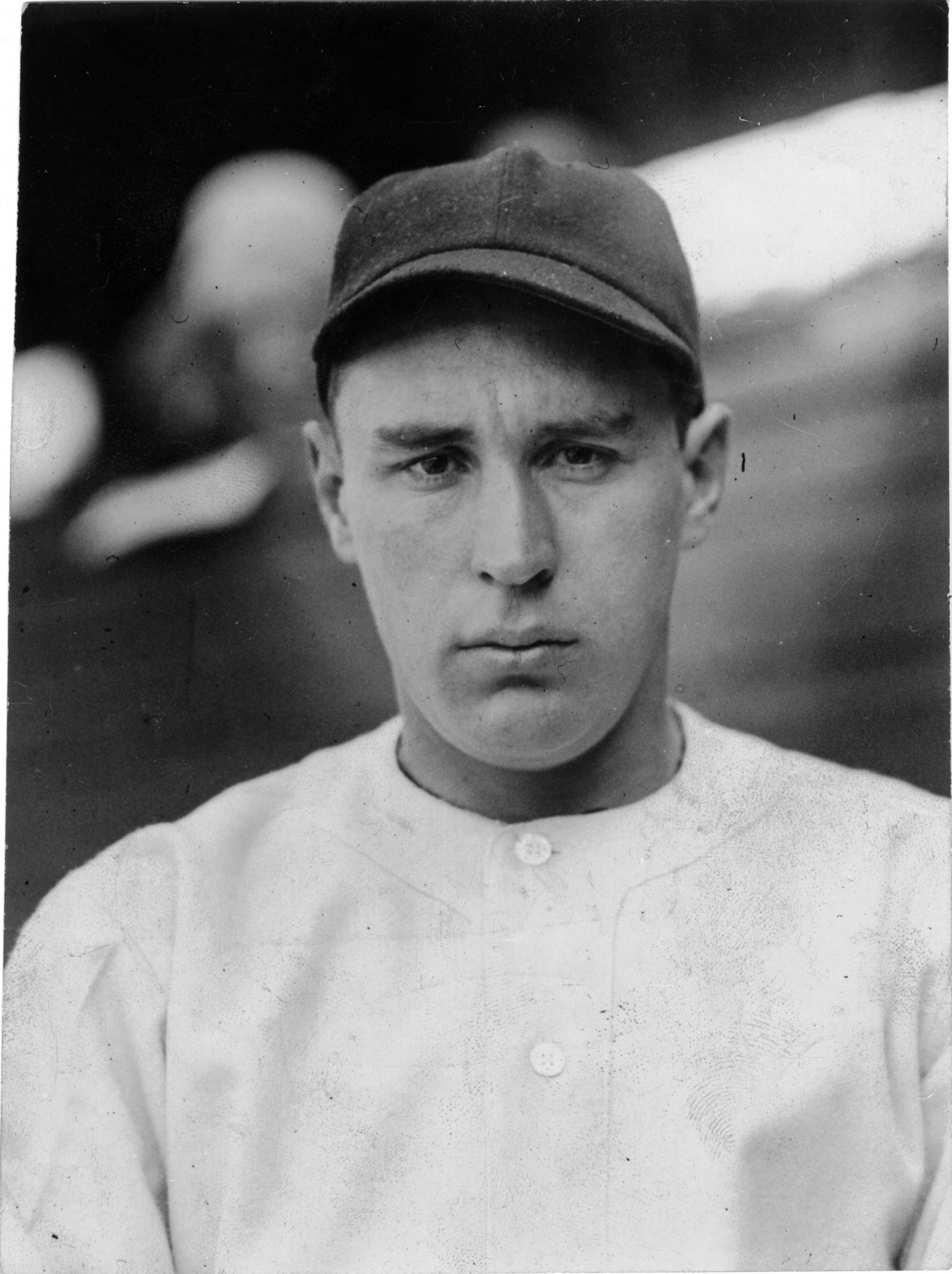
Jim Brillheart

Brillheart is one of the few pitchers in baseball history to appear in over 1,000 games, compiling 956 in the minor leagues and 86 in the major leagues, during a career which lasted from 1921 to 1951. He was 18 years old when he reached the majors in 1922, and was the youngest player in the major leagues that season, pitching in 31 games for the Senators. He played for three different teams in part of four seasons, in which he posted an 8–9 record with 98 strikeouts and a 4.19 ERA in 286 innings pitched. His minor league career continued through 1951, when he pitched in 3 games for Tacoma of the Western International League.

Brillheart was the first Pulaski County, Virginia-born player to reach the major leagues. He was inducted into the Pulaski County Baseball Hall Of Fame in 2009. Brillheart married the former Gertie Lake Lester on November 3, 1923, and they had one son, James Benson Brilheart Jr. An extensive biography of Brillheart was written by John F. Green for the Society for American Baseball Research. Brillheart died in Radford, Virginia at the age of 68.
