= Batting average (baseball) =

Baseball player's batting statistics

In baseball, batting average (BA) is determined by dividing a player's hits by their total at-bats. It is usually rounded to three decimal places and read without the decimal: A player with a batting average of .300 is said to be "batting three hundred". If necessary to break ties, batting averages could be taken beyond the .001 measurement. In this context, .001 is considered a "point", such that a .235 batter is five points higher than a .230 batter.

== History ==
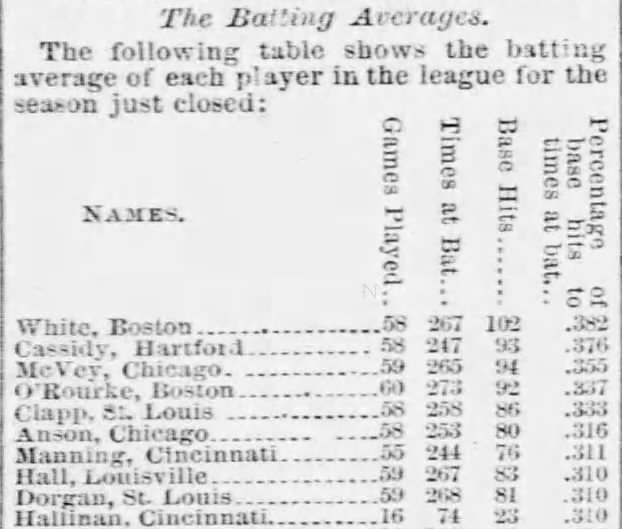
Top batting averages for the 1877 season, as published in The Buffalo Sunday Morning News— Deacon White led the league

Henry Chadwick, an English statistician raised on cricket, was an influential figure in the early history of baseball. He is credited with creating the modern box score, in 1859, and the practice of denoting a strikeout with a "K". Chadwick wrote in 1869: "In making up a score at the close of the match the record should be as follows:–Name of player, total number of times the first base was made by clean hits, total bases so made, left on bases after clean hits, and the number of times the first base has been made on errors..." This led to the recording of "clean" hits—times a batter reached base without benefit of an error. In 1869, another early baseball proponent, Alfred Wright, published an end-of-season summary that included the average number of times a batter had "clean" hits on a per game basis. In 1871, a writer for the New York Clipper, Hervie Dobson, proposed that a batter's "average is found by dividing his total 'times first base on clean hits' by his total number of times he went to the bat"—hits divided by at bats. By 1874, some teams were calculating batting averages, and by 1876, it was being calculated by all teams of the National League.

== Values ==
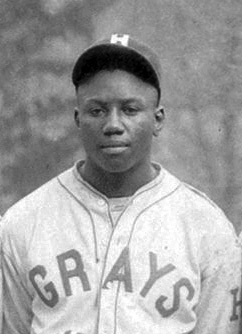
Josh Gibson has the highest major-league career batting average (.371). He is also the most recent player to hit .400 in a season (1943).

Hugh Duffy had a .440 average for the 1894 season.

In modern times, a season batting average of .300 or higher is considered to be excellent, and an average higher than .400 is a nearly unachievable goal. The last Major League Baseball (MLB) player to do so, with enough plate appearances to qualify for the batting championship, was Ted Williams of the Boston Red Sox, who hit .406 in 1941.

Note that batting averages are rounded; entering the final day of the 1941 season, Williams was at 179-for-448, which is .39955 and would have been recorded as .400 via rounding. However, Williams played in both games of a doubleheader, went 6-for-8, and ended the season 185-for-456, which is .40570 and becomes .406 when rounded.

Since 1941, no American League or National League player has hit .400 or above—the highest single-season average in those leagues has been .394 by Tony Gwynn of the San Diego Padres in 1994. Wade Boggs hit .401 over a 162-game span with Boston from June 9, 1985, to June 6, 1986, but never hit above .368 for an MLB season. There have been numerous attempts to explain the disappearance of the .400 hitter, with one of the more rigorous discussions of this question appearing in Stephen Jay Gould's 1996 book Full House. Josh Gibson hit .466 in 1943 while playing for the Homestead Grays of the Negro National League, one of several leagues within Negro league baseball that are now recognized by MLB.

Gibson holds the record for highest major-league career batting average at .371, four points higher than Ty Cobb, who has the second-highest career average at .367. (Note: Different sources of baseball records present somewhat differing lists of career batting average leaders. See also List of Major League Baseball career batting average leaders.) The record for lowest career batting average for a player with more than 2,500 at-bats belongs to Bill Bergen, a catcher who played from 1901 to 1911 and recorded a .170 average in 3,028 career at-bats.

Hugh Duffy, who played from 1888 to 1906, is credited with the highest single-season batting average, having hit .440 in 1894. The modern-era (post-1900) record for highest batting average for a season is held by Nap Lajoie, who hit .426 in 1901, the first year of play for the American League. The modern-era record for the lowest batting average for a player that qualified for the batting title is held by Chris Davis, who hit .168 in 2018. While finishing six plate appearances short of qualifying for the batting title, Adam Dunn of the Chicago White Sox hit .159 for the 2011 season, nine points lower than the record. The highest batting average for a rookie was .408 in 1911 by Shoeless Joe Jackson.

The league batting average in MLB for the 2018 season was .248, with the highest modern-era MLB average being .296 in 1930, and the lowest being .237 in 1968. For non-pitchers, a batting average below .230 is often considered poor, and one below .200 is usually unacceptable. This latter level is sometimes referred to as "The Mendoza Line", named for Mario Mendoza—a lifetime .215 hitter but a good defensive shortstop.

Sabermetrics, the study of baseball statistics, considers batting average a weak measure of performance because it does not correlate as well as other measures to runs scored, thereby causing it to have little predictive value. Batting average does not take into account bases on balls (walks) or power, whereas other statistics such as on-base percentage and slugging percentage have been specifically designed to measure such concepts. Adding these statistics together form a player's on-base plus slugging or "OPS". This is commonly seen as a much better, though not perfect, indicator of a player's overall batting ability as it is a measure of hitting for average, hitting for power, and drawing walks.

=== Anomalies ===
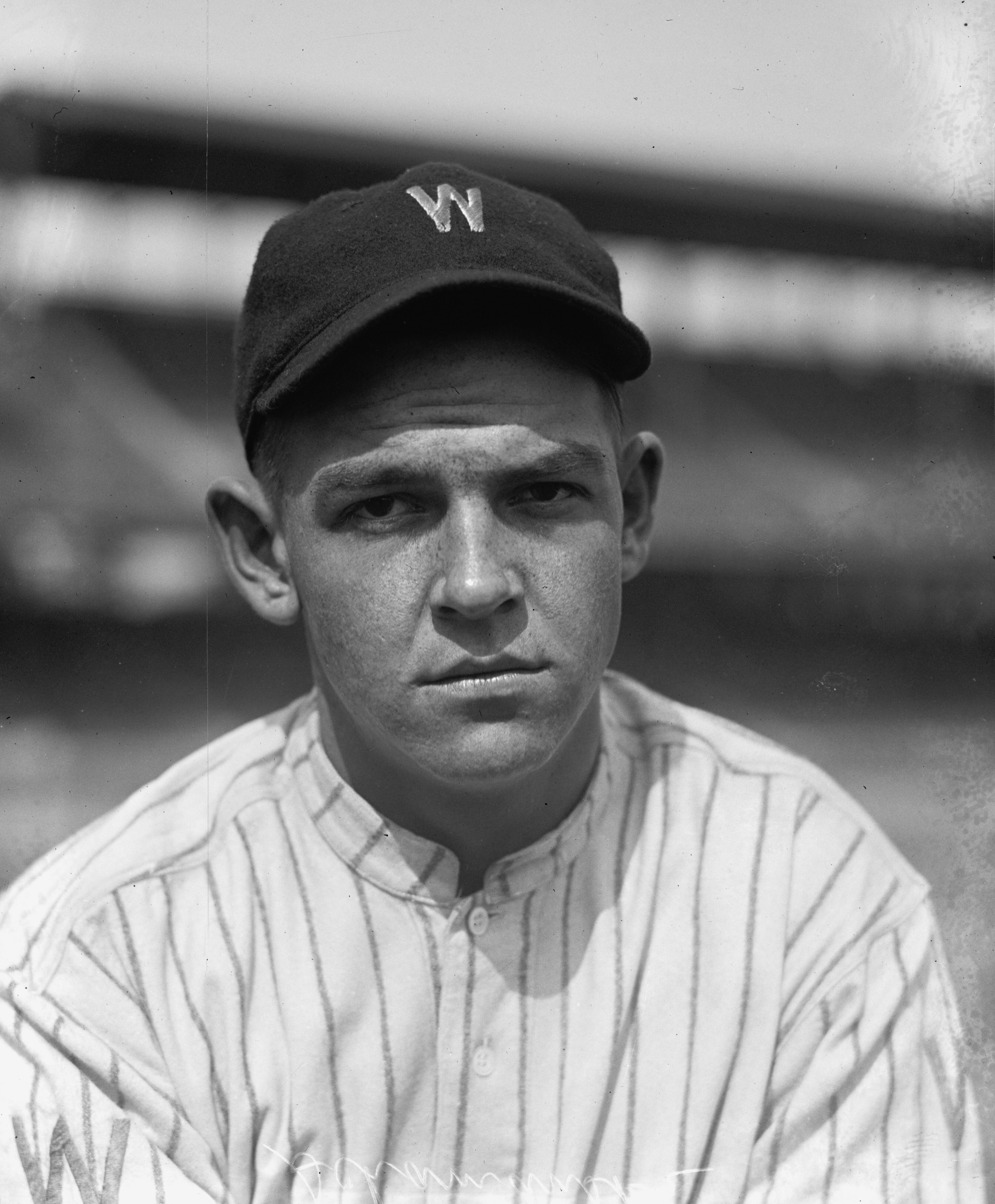
Fred Schemanske finished his brief major-league career with a 1.000 batting average.

In 1887, bases on balls (walks) were counted as hits by the major leagues in existence at the time. This inflated batting averages, with 11 players batting .400 or better, and the experiment was abandoned the following season. Historical statistics for the season were later revised, such that "Bases on balls shall always be treated as neither a time at bat nor a hit for the batter."

==== 1.000 career average ====
In rare instances, players have concluded their careers with a perfect batting average of 1.000—through the 2021 season, there were 94 such players in major-league history, 83 of whom recorded exactly one hit in one at bat. Only one player with a 1.000 average has had three hits—outfielder John Paciorek (1963), who had three hits in three at bats; he also had two walks, and scored four runs. Players who had two hits in their only two at bats include: pitcher Frank O'Connor (1893), catcher Mike Hopkins (1902), pitcher Doc Tonkin (1907), pitcher Hal Deviney (1920), pitcher Fred Schemanske (1923), pitcher Chet Kehn (1942), second baseman Steve Biras (1944), and pitcher Jason Roach (2003). Pitcher Esteban Yan, who played in 472 major-league games from 1996 to 2006, mainly in the American League (where pitchers have rarely batted since the introduction of the designated hitter in 1973), also had two hits in his only two at bats, one a home run.

== Qualifications for the batting title ==
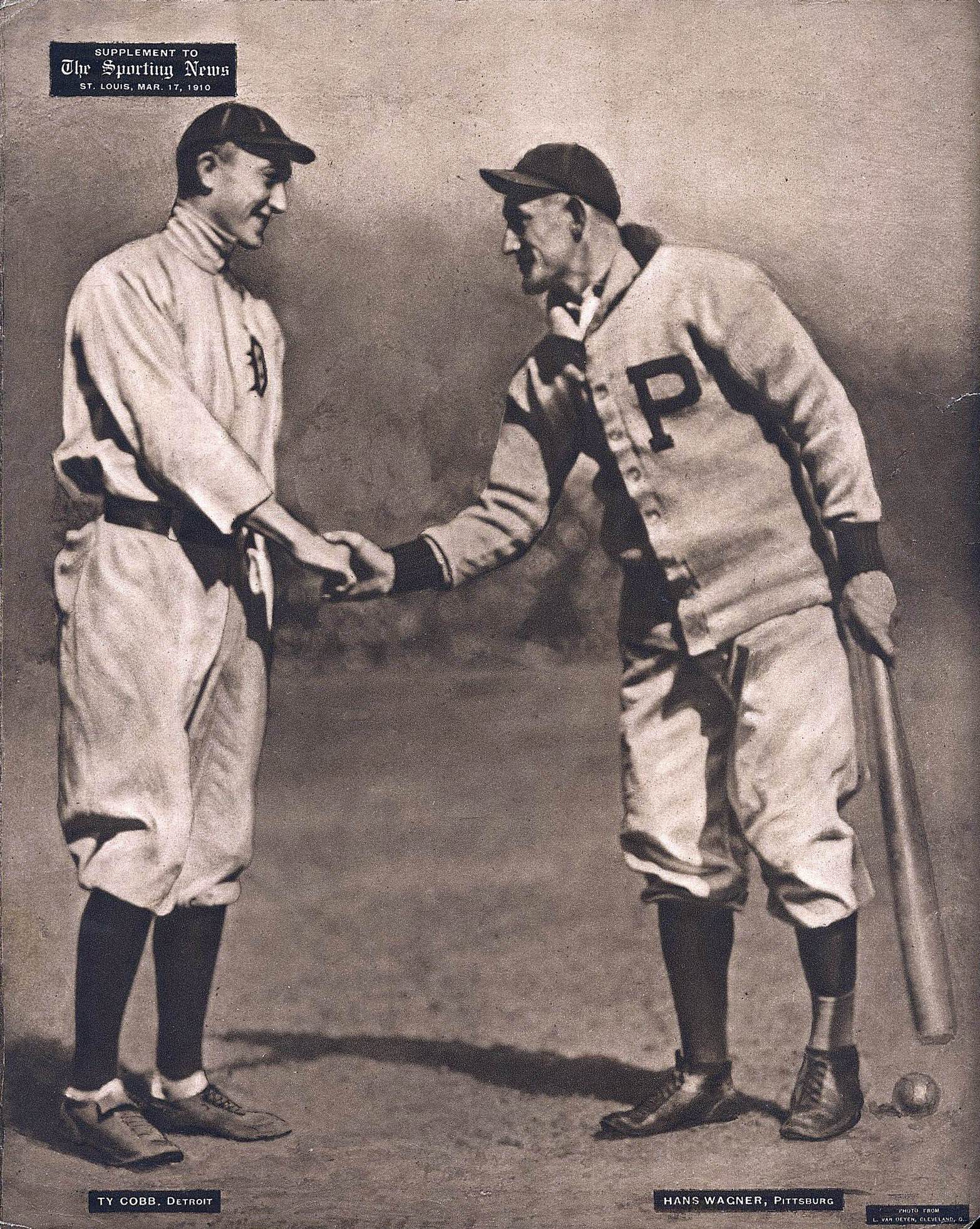
Ty Cobb (left) and Honus Wagner in 1909

The MLB batting averages championships (often referred to as "the batting title") are awarded annually to the player in each league with the highest batting average. Ty Cobb holds the MLB and American League (AL) record for most batting titles, officially winning 11 in his career. The National League (NL) record of eight batting titles is shared by Honus Wagner and Tony Gwynn. Most of Cobb's career and all of Wagner's career occurred during the dead-ball era, which was characterized by higher batting averages by star players (although the overall league batting average was historically at its lowest during that era) and much less power, whereas Gwynn's career took place in the live-ball era.

To determine which players are eligible to win the batting title, the following conditions have been used over the sport's history:

- Pre-1920 – A player is required to appear in at least 100 games when the schedule was 154 games, and 90 games when the schedule was 140 games. An exception to the rule was made for Ty Cobb in 1914, who appeared in 98 games but had a big lead and was also a favorite of American League President Ban Johnson.
- 1920–1949 – A player had to appear in 100 games to qualify in the NL; the AL used 100 games from 1920 to 1935, and 400 at-bats from 1936 to 1949. The NL was advised to adopt 400 at-bats for the 1945 season, but National League President Ford Frick refused, feeling that 100 games should stand for the benefit of catchers and injured players. (Taffy Wright is often erroneously said to have been cheated out of the 1938 batting title; he batted .350 in exactly 100 games, with 263 ABs. Jimmie Foxx hit .349, in 149 games and 565 AB. But since the AL requirement that year was 400 at-bats, Foxx's batting title is undisputed.)
- 1950–1956 – A player needed 2.6 at-bats per team game originally scheduled. (With the 154-game schedule of the time, that meant a rounded-off 400 at-bats.) From 1951 to 1954, if the player with the highest average in a league failed to meet the minimum at-bat requirement, the remaining at-bats until qualification (e.g., five at-bats, if the player finished the season with 395 at-bats) were hypothetically considered hitless at-bats; if his recalculated batting average still topped the league, he was awarded the title. This standard was applied in the AL from 1936 to 1956.
- 1957 to the present – A player has needed 3.1 plate appearances per team game originally scheduled; thus, players were no longer penalized for walking so frequently or benefitted from walking so rarely. (In 1954, for example, Ted Williams batted .345 but had only 386 ABs, while topping the AL with 136 walks. Williams thus lost the batting title to Cleveland's Bobby Ávila, who hit .341 in 555 ABs.) In the 154-game schedule, the required number of plate appearances was 477, and since the era of the 162-game schedule, the requisite number of plate appearances has been 502. Adjustments to this figure were made during strike-shortened seasons, such as 1972, 1981, 1994, and 1995.

From 1967 to the present, if the player with the highest average in a league does not meet the minimum plate-appearance requirement, the remaining at-bats until qualification (e.g., five at-bats, if the player finished the season with 497 plate appearances) are hypothetically considered hitless at-bats; if his recalculated batting average still tops the league, he is awarded the title. This is officially Rule 10.22(a), but it is also known as the "Tony Gwynn rule" because the Padres' player won the batting crown in 1996 with a .353 average on just 498 plate appearances (i.e., he was four short). Gwynn was awarded the title since he would have led the league even if he had gone 0-for-4 in those missing plate appearances. His average would have dropped to .349, five points better than second-place Ellis Burks' .344. In 2012, a one-time amendment to the rule was made to disqualify Melky Cabrera from the title. Cabrera requested that he be disqualified after serving a suspension that season for a positive testosterone test. He had batted .346 with 501 plate appearances, and the original rule would have awarded him the title over San Francisco Giants teammate Buster Posey, who won batting .336.

== All-time leaders ==
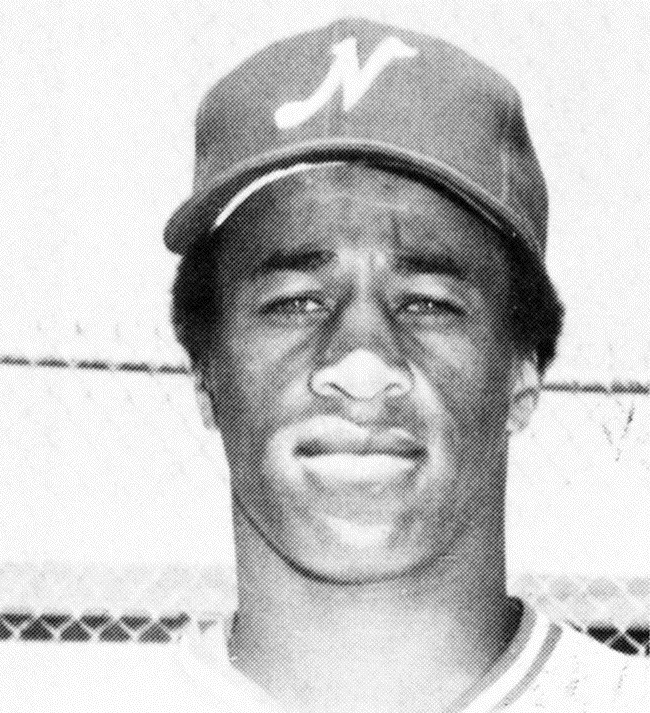
Gary Redus batted .462 during the 1978 minor-league season.

=== Minor League Baseball ===
The highest recorded single-season batting average in Minor League Baseball is .462, accomplished by Gary Redus in 1978, when he played for the Billings Mustangs, an affiliate of the Cincinnati Reds in the Rookie Advanced-level Pioneer League. Redus was 117-for-253 in 68 games, as the Pioneer League only plays from June to early September. Redus went on to play in MLB from 1982 through 1994, batting .252 during his MLB career.

=== Nippon Professional Baseball ===
In Nippon Professional Baseball (NPB), the leader in career batting average is Isao Harimoto, a member of the Japanese Baseball Hall of Fame, who hit .319 in his NPB career. Ichiro Suzuki batted .353 in NPB, but does not have enough NPB career at-bats to qualify for the league's title. Sadaharu Oh had a batting average of .355 in 1973 season. Randy Bass had a batting average of .389 in 1986 season.

=== KBO League ===
In KBO League (KBO), the leader in career batting average is Jung-hoo Lee, who hit .340 in his KBO career and is currently an active player. Baek In-chun had a batting average of .412 in 1982 season. This is the highest batting average of one season in KBO League.

== See also ==
- Batting average (cricket)
