= 1915 Washington Senators season =

1915 Washington Senators
- League: American League
- Ballpark: National Park
- City: Washington, D.C.
- Record: 85–68 (.556)
- League place: 4th
- Owners: Thomas C. Noyes
- Managers: Clark Griffith

The 1915 Washington Senators won 85 games, lost 68, and finished in fourth place in the American League. They were managed by Clark Griffith and played home games at National Park.

== Regular season ==
=== Season standings ===
American League
Team	W	L	Pct.	GB	Home	Road
Boston Red Sox	101	50	.669	—	55‍–‍20	46‍–‍30
Detroit Tigers	100	54	.649	2½	51‍–‍26	49‍–‍28
Chicago White Sox	93	61	.604	9½	54‍–‍24	39‍–‍37
Washington Senators	85	68	.556	17	50‍–‍29	35‍–‍39
New York Yankees	69	83	.454	32½	37‍–‍43	32‍–‍40
St. Louis Browns	63	91	.409	39½	35‍–‍38	28‍–‍53
Cleveland Indians	57	95	.375	44½	27‍–‍50	30‍–‍45
Philadelphia Athletics	43	109	.283	58½	19‍–‍53	24‍–‍56

=== Record vs. opponents ===
1915 American League record Sources:
Team	BOS	CWS	CLE	DET	NYY	PHA	SLB	WSH
Boston	—	12–10	16–4	14–8	10–12	17–5–1	17–5–2	15–6–1
Chicago	10–12	—	16–6	7–15	15–7	19–3	18–4	8–14–1
Cleveland	4–16	6–16	—	5–17	9–13–1	15–7–1	12–10	6–16
Detroit	8–14	15–7	17–5	—	17–5	17–5	13–9–2	13–9
New York	12–10	7–15	13–9–1	5–17	—	11–9	12–10–1	9–13
Philadelphia	5–17–1	3–19	7–15–1	5–17	9–11	—	6–16	8–14
St. Louis	5–17–2	4–18	10–12	9–13–2	10–12–1	16–6	—	9–13
Washington	6–15–1	14–8–1	16–6	9–13	13–9	14–8	13–9	—

=== Notable transactions ===
- July 29, 1915: Merlin Kopp was purchased by the Senators from the St. Thomas Saints.

=== Roster ===
1915 Washington Senators
Roster
Pitchers: Nick Altrock; Doc Ayers; Jack Bentley; Joe Boehling; George Dumont; Joe Engel; Bert Gallia; Harry Harper; Bill Hopper; Walter Johnson; Sam Rice; Jim Shaw	Catchers: Eddie Ainsmith; John Henry; Rip Williams; Infielders: Tom Connolly; Eddie Foster; Chick Gandil; Joe Judge; George McBride; Ray Morgan; Doug Neff; Carl Sawyer	Outfielders: Merito Acosta; Turner Barber; Charlie Jamieson; Merlin Kopp; Sam Mayer; Clyde Milan; Horace Milan; Danny Moeller; Henri Rondeau; Howie Shanks; Other batters: Charlie Pick	Manager: Clark Griffith

== Player stats ==
=== Batting ===
==== Starters by position ====
Note: Pos = Position; G = Games played; AB = At bats; H = Hits; Avg. = Batting average; HR = Home runs; RBI = Runs batted in

Pos	Player	G	AB	H	Avg.	HR	RBI
C	John Henry	95	277	61	.220	1	22
1B	Chick Gandil	136	485	141	.291	2	64
2B	Ray Morgan	62	193	45	.233	0	21
SS	George McBride	146	476	97	.204	1	30
3B	Eddie Foster	154	618	170	.275	0	52
OF	Clyde Milan	153	573	165	.288	2	66
OF	Danny Moeller	118	438	99	.226	2	23
OF	Howie Shanks	141	492	123	.250	0	47

==== Other batters ====
Note: G = Games played; AB = At bats; H = Hits; Avg. = Batting average; HR = Home runs; RBI = Runs batted in

Player	G	AB	H	Avg.	HR	RBI
Rip Williams	91	197	48	.244	0	31
Merito Acosta	72	163	34	.209	0	18
Tom Connolly	50	141	26	.184	0	7
Eddie Ainsmith	47	120	24	.200	0	6
Charlie Jamieson	17	68	19	.279	0	7
Doug Neff	30	60	10	.167	0	4
Turner Barber	20	53	16	.302	0	6
Joe Judge	12	41	17	.415	0	9
Henri Rondeau	14	40	7	.175	0	4
Merlin Kopp	16	32	8	.250	0	0
Carl Sawyer	10	32	8	.250	0	3
Sam Mayer	11	29	7	.241	1	4
Horace Milan	11	27	11	.407	0	7
Charlie Pick	3	2	0	.000	0	0

=== Pitching ===
==== Starting pitchers ====
Note: G = Games pitched; IP = Innings pitched; W = Wins; L = Losses; ERA = Earned run average; SO = Strikeouts

Player	G	IP	W	L	ERA	SO
Walter Johnson	47	336.2	27	13	1.55	203
Bert Gallia	43	259.2	17	11	2.29	130
Joe Boehling	40	229.1	14	13	3.22	108
Jim Shaw	25	133.0	6	11	2.50	78
George Dumont	6	40.0	2	1	2.03	18

==== Other pitchers ====
Note: G = Games pitched; IP = Innings pitched; W = Wins; L = Losses; ERA = Earned run average; SO = Strikeouts

Player	G	IP	W	L	ERA	SO
Doc Ayers	40	211.1	14	9	2.21	96
Harry Harper	19	86.1	4	4	1.77	54
Joe Engel	11	33.2	0	3	3.21	9
Sam Rice	4	18.0	1	0	2.00	9
Jack Bentley	4	11.1	0	2	0.79	0

==== Relief pitchers ====
Note: G = Games pitched; W = Wins; L = Losses; SV = Saves; ERA = Earned run average; SO = Strikeouts

Player	G	W	L	SV	ERA	SO
Bill Hopper	13	0	1	1	4.60	8
Nick Altrock	1	0	0	1	9.00	2
Sam Mayer	1	0	0	0	----	0
