= 1916 Washington Senators season =

1916 Washington Senators
- League: American League
- Ballpark: National Park
- City: Washington, D.C.
- Record: 76–77 (.497)
- League place: 7th
- Owners: Thomas C. Noyes
- Managers: Clark Griffith

The 1916 Washington Senators won 76 games, lost 77, and finished in seventh place in the American League. They were managed by Clark Griffith and played home games at National Park.

== Regular season ==
=== Season standings ===
American League
Team	W	L	Pct.	GB	Home	Road
Boston Red Sox	91	63	.591	—	49‍–‍28	42‍–‍35
Chicago White Sox	89	65	.578	2	49‍–‍28	40‍–‍37
Detroit Tigers	87	67	.565	4	49‍–‍28	38‍–‍39
New York Yankees	80	74	.519	11	46‍–‍31	34‍–‍43
St. Louis Browns	79	75	.513	12	45‍–‍32	34‍–‍43
Cleveland Indians	77	77	.500	14	44‍–‍33	33‍–‍44
Washington Senators	76	77	.497	14½	49‍–‍28	27‍–‍49
Philadelphia Athletics	36	117	.235	54½	23‍–‍53	13‍–‍64

=== Record vs. opponents ===
1916 American League record Sources:
Team	BOS	CWS	CLE	DET	NYY	PHA	SLB	WSH
Boston	—	14–8	15–7	14–8	11–11	16–6	10–12–1	11–11–1
Chicago	8–14	—	13–9	13–9	10–12	18–4	15–7	12–10–1
Cleveland	7–15	9–13	—	11–11	12–10	18–4	11–11–2	9–13–1
Detroit	8–14	9–13	11–11	—	14–8–1	18–4	13–9	14–8
New York	11–11	12–10	10–12	8–14–1	—	15–7	9–13	15–7–1
Philadelphia	6–16	4–18	4–18	4–18	7–15	—	5–17	6–15–1
St. Louis	12–10–1	7–15	11–11–2	9–13	13–9	17–5	—	10–12–1
Washington	11–11–1	10–12–1	13–9–1	8–14	7–15–1	15–6–1	12–10–1	—

=== Roster ===
1916 Washington Senators
Roster
Pitchers: Doc Ayers; Jack Bentley; Joe Boehling; Molly Craft; George Dumont; Bert Gallia; Marv Goodwin; Harry Harper; Walter Johnson; Jim Shaw; Claude Thomas	Catchers: Eddie Ainsmith; Patsy Gharrity; John Henry; Infielders: Eddie Foster; Joe Judge; Joe Leonard; George McBride; Ray Morgan; Carl Sawyer; Rip Williams	Outfielders: Merito Acosta; Turner Barber; Charlie Jamieson; Mike Menosky; Clyde Milan; Danny Moeller; Sam Rice; Henri Rondeau; Howie Shanks; Elmer Smith	Manager: Clark Griffith

== Player stats ==
=== Batting ===
==== Starters by position ====
Note: Pos = Position; G = Games played; AB = At bats; H = Hits; Avg. = Batting average; HR = Home runs; RBI = Runs batted in

Pos	Player	G	AB	H	Avg.	HR	RBI
C	John Henry	117	305	76	.249	0	46
1B	Joe Judge	103	336	74	.220	0	28
2B	Ray Morgan	99	315	84	.267	1	29
SS	George McBride	139	466	106	.227	1	36
3B	Eddie Foster	158	606	153	.252	1	44
OF	Danny Moeller	78	240	59	.246	1	23
OF	Howie Shanks	140	471	119	.253	1	48
OF	Clyde Milan	150	565	154	.273	1	45

==== Other batters ====
Note: G = Games played; AB = At bats; H = Hits; Avg. = Batting average; HR = Home runs; RBI = Runs batted in

Player	G	AB	H	Avg.	HR	RBI
Rip Williams	76	202	54	.267	0	20
Sam Rice	58	197	59	.299	1	17
Elmer Smith	45	168	36	.214	2	27
Joe Leonard	42	168	46	.274	0	14
Henri Rondeau	50	162	36	.222	1	28
Charlie Jamieson	64	145	36	.248	0	13
Eddie Ainsmith	51	100	17	.170	0	8
Patsy Gharrity	39	92	21	.228	0	9
Mike Menosky	11	37	6	.162	0	3
Turner Barber	15	33	7	.212	1	5
Carl Sawyer	16	31	6	.194	0	2
Merito Acosta	5	8	1	.125	0	0

=== Pitching ===
==== Starting pitchers ====
Note: G = Games pitched; IP = Innings pitched; W = Wins; L = Losses; ERA = Earned run average; SO = Strikeouts

Player	G	IP	W	L	ERA	SO
Walter Johnson	48	369.2	25	20	1.90	228
Bert Gallia	49	283.2	17	13	2.76	120
Harry Harper	36	249.2	14	10	2.45	149
Joe Boehling	27	139.2	9	11	3.09	52

==== Other pitchers ====
Note: G = Games pitched; IP = Innings pitched; W = Wins; L = Losses; ERA = Earned run average; SO = Strikeouts

Player	G	IP	W	L	ERA	SO
Doc Ayers	43	157.0	5	8	3.78	69
Jim Shaw	26	106.1	3	8	2.62	44
George Dumont	17	53.0	2	3	3.06	21
Claude Thomas	7	28.1	1	2	4.13	7
Sam Rice	5	21.1	0	1	2.95	3
Molly Craft	2	11.0	0	1	3.27	9

==== Relief pitchers ====
Note: G = Games pitched; W = Wins; L = Losses; SV = Saves; ERA = Earned run average; SO = Strikeouts

Player	G	W	L	SV	ERA	SO
Marv Goodwin	3	0	0	0	3.18	1
Jack Bentley	2	0	0	0	0.00	1
Charlie Jamieson	1	0	0	0	4.50	2
