= 1913 Washington Senators season =

1913 Washington Senators
- League: American League
- Ballpark: National Park
- City: Washington, D.C.
- Record: 90–64 (.584)
- League place: 2nd
- Owners: Thomas C. Noyes
- Managers: Clark Griffith

The 1913 Washington Senators won 90 games, lost 64, and finished in second place in the American League. They were managed by Clark Griffith and played home games at National Park.

== Regular season ==
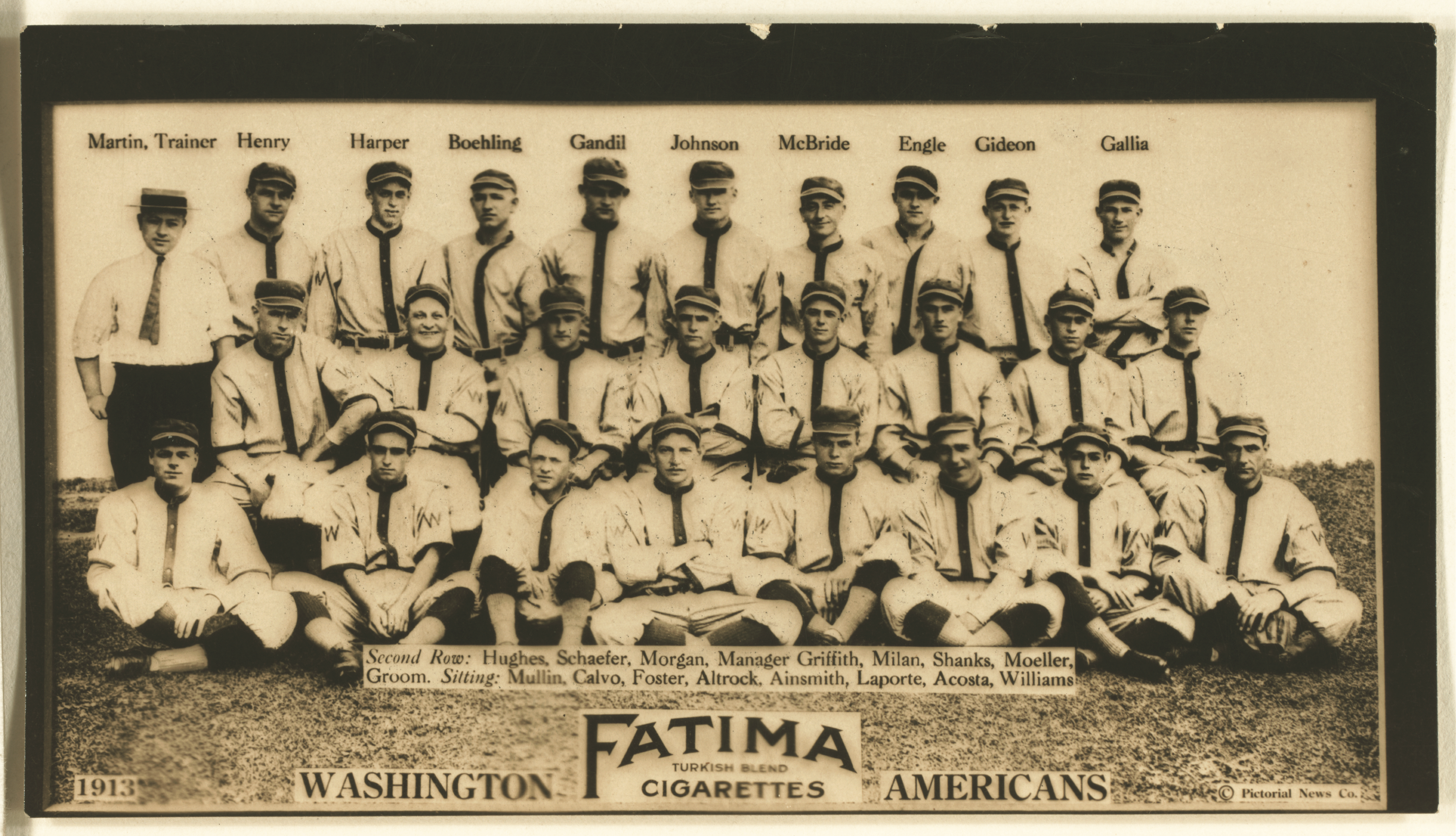
The 1913 Washington Senators team photo.

This was a good season for a team that was considered perennial losers. The nucleus was still pitcher Walter Johnson. He won each category of the pitching triple crown and was voted league MVP. Clyde Milan, Johnson's friend, set a modern-day stolen base record, with 75. The offense was led by future Black Sox ringleader Chick Gandil, who hit .318 and drove in a team-leading 72 runs. Eccentric Germany Schaefer hit .320 in limited action.

=== Season standings ===
American League
Team	W	L	Pct.	GB	Home	Road
Philadelphia Athletics	96	57	.627	—	50‍–‍26	46‍–‍31
Washington Senators	90	64	.584	6½	42‍–‍35	48‍–‍29
Cleveland Naps	86	66	.566	9½	45‍–‍32	41‍–‍34
Boston Red Sox	79	71	.527	15½	41‍–‍34	38‍–‍37
Chicago White Sox	78	74	.513	17½	40‍–‍37	38‍–‍37
Detroit Tigers	66	87	.431	30	34‍–‍42	32‍–‍45
New York Yankees	57	94	.377	38	27‍–‍47	30‍–‍47
St. Louis Browns	57	96	.373	39	31‍–‍46	26‍–‍50

=== Record vs. opponents ===
1913 American League record Sources:
Team	BOS	CWS	CLE	DET	NYY	PHA	SLB	WSH
Boston	—	10–11	8–13	13–9	14–6–1	11–11	17–5	6–16
Chicago	11–10	—	9–13–1	13–9	11–10	11–11	12–10	11–11
Cleveland	13–8	13–9–1	—	14–7	14–8–1	9–13	16–6–1	7–15
Detroit	9–13	9–13	7–14	—	11–11	7–15	11–11	12–10
New York	6–14–1	10–11	8–14–1	11–11	—	5–17	11–11	6–16
Philadelphia	11–11	11–11	13–9	15–7	17–5	—	15–6	14–8
St. Louis	5–17	10–12	6–16–1	11–11	11–11	6–15	—	8–14–1
Washington	16–6	11–11	15–7	10–12	16–6	8–14	14–8–1	—

=== Roster ===
1913 Washington Senators
Roster
Pitchers: Nick Altrock; Doc Ayers; Jack Bentley; Joe Boehling; Carl Cashion; Rex Dawson; Tom Drohan; Joe Engel; Bert Gallia; Clark Griffith; Bob Groom; Harry Harper; Harry Hedgpeth; Tom Hughes; Walter Johnson; Slim Love; George Mullin; Jim Shaw; Mutt Williams; John Wilson	Catchers: Eddie Ainsmith; John Henry; Jack Ryan; Rip Williams; Infielders: Eddie Foster; Chick Gandil; Frank LaPorte; George McBride; Ray Morgan; Bill Morley; Germany Schaefer	Outfielders: Merito Acosta; Jack Calvo; Joe Gedeon; Clyde Milan; Danny Moeller; Howie Shanks; Ben Spencer	Manager: Clark Griffith

== Player stats ==
=== Batting ===
==== Starters by position ====
Note: Pos = Position; G = Games played; AB = At bats; H = Hits; Avg. = Batting average; HR = Home runs; RBI = Runs batted in

Pos	Player	G	AB	H	Avg.	HR	RBI
C	John Henry	96	273	61	.223	1	26
1B	Chick Gandil	148	550	175	.318	1	72
2B	Ray Morgan	138	481	131	.272	0	57
SS	George McBride	150	499	107	.214	1	52
3B	Eddie Foster	106	409	101	.247	1	41
OF	Clyde Milan	154	579	174	.301	3	54
OF	Danny Moeller	153	589	139	.236	5	42
OF	Howie Shanks	109	390	99	.254	1	37

==== Other batters ====
Note: G = Games played; AB = At bats; H = Hits; Avg. = Batting average; HR = Home runs; RBI = Runs batted in

Player	G	AB	H	Avg.	HR	RBI
Eddie Ainsmith	79	242	61	.252	0	18
Rip Williams	66	106	30	.283	1	12
Germany Schaefer	54	100	32	.320	0	7
Joe Gedeon	29	71	13	.183	0	6
Jack Calvo	17	33	8	.242	1	2
Ben Spencer	8	21	6	.286	0	2
Merito Acosta	12	20	6	.300	0	1
Carl Cashion	7	12	3	.250	0	2
Bill Morley	2	3	0	.000	0	0
Clark Griffith	1	1	1	1.000	0	1
Jack Ryan	1	1	0	.000	0	0

=== Pitching ===
==== Starting pitchers ====
Note: G = Games pitched; IP = Innings pitched; W = Wins; L = Losses; ERA = Earned run average; SO = Strikeouts

Player	G	IP	W	L	ERA	SO
Walter Johnson	48	346.0	36	7	1.14	243
Bob Groom	37	264.1	16	16	3.23	156
Joe Boehling	38	235.1	17	7	2.14	110
George Mullin	11	57.1	3	5	5.02	14
Mutt Williams	1	4.0	1	0	4.50	1

==== Other pitchers ====
Note: G = Games pitched; IP = Innings pitched; W = Wins; L = Losses; ERA = Earned run average; SO = Strikeouts

Player	G	IP	W	L	ERA	SO
Joe Engel	36	164.2	8	9	3.06	70
Tom Hughes	36	129.2	4	12	4.30	59
Doc Ayers	4	17.2	1	1	1.53	17
Slim Love	5	16.2	1	0	1.62	5
Jim Shaw	2	13.0	0	1	2.08	14
Jack Bentley	3	11.0	1	0	0.00	5
Carl Cashion	4	9.0	1	1	6.00	3

==== Relief pitchers ====
Note: G = Games pitched; W = Wins; L = Losses; SV = Saves; ERA = Earned run average; SO = Strikeouts

Player	G	W	L	SV	ERA	SO
Bert Gallia	31	1	5	3	4.13	46
Harry Harper	4	0	0	0	3.55	9
Nick Altrock	4	0	0	0	5.00	2
John Wilson	3	0	0	0	4.50	1
Tom Drohan	2	0	0	0	9.00	2
Clark Griffith	1	0	0	0	0.00	0
Rex Dawson	1	0	0	0	0.00	1
Harry Hedgpeth	1	0	0	1	0.00	0
Eddie Ainsmith	1	0	0	0	54.00	0
Germany Schaefer	1	0	0	0	54.00	0
Joe Gedeon	1	0	0	1	0.00	0

== Awards and honors ==
=== League awards ===
Walter Johnson

- AL Most Valuable Player

=== League top five finishers ===
Walter Johnson

- MLB leader in wins (36)
- MLB leader in ERA (1.14)
- MLB leader in strikeouts (243)
- MLB leader in shutouts (11)

Clyde Milan

- MLB leader in stolen bases (75)

Danny Moeller

- #2 in AL in stolen bases (62)
