= 1912 Washington Senators season =

1912 Washington Senators
- League: American League
- Ballpark: National Park
- City: Washington, D.C.
- Record: 91–61 (.599)
- League place: 2nd
- Owners: Thomas C. Noyes
- Managers: Clark Griffith

The 1912 Washington Senators won 91 games, lost 61, and finished in second place in the American League. They were managed by Clark Griffith and played their home games at National Park.

== Regular season ==
=== Season standings ===
American League
Team	W	L	Pct.	GB	Home	Road
Boston Red Sox	105	47	.691	—	57‍–‍20	48‍–‍27
Washington Senators	91	61	.599	14	45‍–‍32	46‍–‍29
Philadelphia Athletics	90	62	.592	15	45‍–‍31	45‍–‍31
Chicago White Sox	78	76	.506	28	34‍–‍43	44‍–‍33
Cleveland Naps	75	78	.490	30½	41‍–‍35	34‍–‍43
Detroit Tigers	69	84	.451	36½	37‍–‍39	32‍–‍45
St. Louis Browns	53	101	.344	53	27‍–‍50	26‍–‍51
New York Highlanders	50	102	.329	55	31‍–‍44	19‍–‍58

=== Record vs. opponents ===
1912 American League record Sources:
Team	BOS	CWS	CLE	DET	NYH	PHA	SLB	WSH
Boston	—	16–6–1	11–11–1	15–6	19–2	15–7	17–5	12–10
Chicago	6–16–1	—	11–11	14–8–1	13–9	12–10	13–9–2	9–13
Cleveland	11–11–1	11–11	—	13–9	13–8–1	8–14	15–7	4–18
Detroit	6–15	8–14–1	9–13	—	16–6	9–13	13–9	8–14
New York	2–19	9–13	8–13–1	6–16	—	5–17	13–9	7–15
Philadelphia	7–15	10–12	14–8	13–9	17–5	—	16–6	13–7–1
St. Louis	5–17	9–13–2	7–15	9–13	9–13	6–16	—	8–14–1
Washington	10–12	13–9	18–4	14–8	15–7	7–13–1	14–8–1	—

=== Notable transactions ===
- August 23, 1912: Tilly Walker and Hippo Vaughn were traded by the Senators to the Kansas City Blues for Bill Kenworthy and Bert Gallia.
- August 23, 1912: Joe Agler was purchased by the Senators from the Atlanta Crackers.
- September 16, 1912: Bill Morley was drafted by the Senators from the Knoxville Reds in the 1912 rule 5 draft.

=== Roster ===
1912 Washington Senators
Roster
Pitchers: Jerry Akers; Nick Altrock; Charlie Becker; Joe Boehling; Carl Cashion; Joe Engel; Bert Gallia; Clark Griffith; Bob Groom; Herb Herring; Tom Hughes; Walter Johnson; Paul Musser; Barney Pelty; Lefty Schegg; Hippo Vaughn; Dixie Walker; Steve White	Catchers: Eddie Ainsmith; John Henry; Rip Williams; Infielders: Joe Agler; Bill Cunningham; John Flynn; Eddie Foster; Chick Gandil; John Knight; Frank LaPorte; George McBride; Ray Morgan; Roxey Roach; Jack Ryan	Outfielders: Bill Kenworthy; Clyde Milan; Danny Moeller; Roy Moran; Germany Schaefer; Howie Shanks; Tilly Walker; Other batters: Dave Howard; Tom Long	Manager: Clark Griffith

== Player stats ==
=== Batting ===
==== Starters by position ====
Note: Pos = Position; G = Games played; AB = At bats; H = Hits; Avg. = Batting average; HR = Home runs; RBI = Runs batted in

Pos	Player	G	AB	H	Avg.	HR	RBI
C	John Henry	66	191	37	.194	0	9
1B	Chick Gandil	117	443	135	.305	2	81
2B	Ray Morgan	81	273	65	.238	1	30
SS	George McBride	152	521	118	.226	1	52
3B	Eddie Foster	154	618	176	.285	2	70
OF	Clyde Milan	154	601	184	.306	1	79
OF	Danny Moeller	132	519	143	.276	6	46
OF	Howie Shanks	116	399	92	.231	1	48

==== Other batters ====
Note: G = Games played; AB = At bats; H = Hits; Avg. = Batting average; HR = Home runs; RBI = Runs batted in

Player	G	AB	H	Avg.	HR	RBI
Eddie Ainsmith	61	186	42	.226	0	22
Germany Schaefer	60	166	41	.247	0	19
Rip Williams	60	157	50	.318	0	22
Frank LaPorte	40	136	42	.309	0	17
Tilly Walker	39	110	30	.273	0	9
John Knight	32	93	15	.161	0	9
John Flynn	20	71	12	.169	0	5
Bill Kenworthy	12	38	9	.237	0	2
Bill Cunningham	8	27	5	.185	1	8
Roy Moran	7	13	2	.154	0	0
Roxey Roach	2	2	1	.500	1	1
Joe Agler	2	1	0	.000	0	0
Nick Altrock	1	1	0	.000	0	0
Clark Griffith	1	1	0	.000	0	0
Tom Long	1	1	0	.000	0	0
Jack Ryan	1	1	0	.000	0	0
Dave Howard	1	0	0	----	0	0

=== Pitching ===
==== Starting pitchers ====
Note: G = Games pitched; IP = Innings pitched; W = Wins; L = Losses; ERA = Earned run average; SO = Strikeouts

Player	G	IP	W	L	ERA	SO
Walter Johnson	50	369.0	33	12	1.39	303
Bob Groom	43	316.0	24	13	2.62	179
Tom Hughes	31	196.0	13	10	2.94	108
Carl Cashion	26	170.1	10	6	3.17	84
Hippo Vaughn	12	81.0	4	3	2.89	49
Dixie Walker	9	60.0	3	6	5.25	29

==== Other pitchers ====
Note: G = Games pitched; IP = Innings pitched; W = Wins; L = Losses; ERA = Earned run average; SO = Strikeouts

Player	G	IP	W	L	ERA	SO
Joe Engel	17	75.0	2	5	3.96	29
Barney Pelty	11	43.2	1	4	3.30	15
Paul Musser	7	20.2	0	0	2.61	10
Jerry Akers	5	20.1	1	1	4.87	11
Lefty Schegg	2	5.1	0	0	3.38	3

==== Relief pitchers ====
Note: G = Games pitched; W = Wins; L = Losses; SV = Saves; ERA = Earned run average; SO = Strikeouts

Player	G	W	L	SV	ERA	SO
Charlie Becker	4	0	0	0	3.00	5
Joe Boehling	3	0	0	0	7.20	2
Bert Gallia	2	0	0	0	0.00	0
Nick Altrock	1	0	1	0	18.00	0
Herb Herring	1	0	0	0	0.00	0
Germany Schaefer	1	0	0	0	0.00	0
Steve White	1	0	0	0	0.00	1
Clark Griffith	1	0	0	0	inf	0
