= 1921 Boston Red Sox season =

Major League Baseball season

1921 Boston Red Sox
- League: American League
- Ballpark: Fenway Park
- City: Boston, Massachusetts
- Record: 75–79 (.487)
- League place: 5th
- Owners: Harry Frazee
- Managers: Hugh Duffy
- Stats: ESPN.com; Baseball Reference

The 1921 Boston Red Sox season was the 21st season in the franchise's Major League Baseball history. The Red Sox finished fifth in the American League (AL) with a record of 75 wins and 79 losses, 23 1/2 games behind the New York Yankees.

== Regular season ==
=== Season standings ===
American League
| Team | W | L | Pct. | GB | Home | Road |
|---|---|---|---|---|---|---|
| New York Yankees | 98 | 55 | .641 | — | 53‍–‍25 | 45‍–‍30 |
| Cleveland Indians | 94 | 60 | .610 | 4½ | 51‍–‍26 | 43‍–‍34 |
| St. Louis Browns | 81 | 73 | .526 | 17½ | 43‍–‍34 | 38‍–‍39 |
| Washington Senators | 80 | 73 | .523 | 18 | 46‍–‍30 | 34‍–‍43 |
| Boston Red Sox | 75 | 79 | .487 | 23½ | 41‍–‍36 | 34‍–‍43 |
| Detroit Tigers | 71 | 82 | .464 | 27 | 37‍–‍40 | 34‍–‍42 |
| Chicago White Sox | 62 | 92 | .403 | 36½ | 37‍–‍40 | 25‍–‍52 |
| Philadelphia Athletics | 53 | 100 | .346 | 45 | 28‍–‍47 | 25‍–‍53 |

=== Record vs. opponents ===
1921 American League record Sources:
| Team | BOS | CWS | CLE | DET | NYY | PHA | SLB | WSH |
|---|---|---|---|---|---|---|---|---|
| Boston | — | 15–7 | 8–14 | 15–7 | 7–15 | 12–10 | 9–13 | 9–13 |
| Chicago | 7–15 | — | 7–15 | 8–14 | 13–9 | 14–8 | 7–15 | 6–16 |
| Cleveland | 14–8 | 15–7 | — | 13–9 | 8–14 | 15–7 | 17–5 | 12–10 |
| Detroit | 7–15 | 14–8 | 9–13 | — | 5–17 | 14–7–1 | 12–10 | 10–12 |
| New York | 15–7 | 9–13 | 14–8 | 17–5 | — | 17–5 | 13–9 | 13–8 |
| Philadelphia | 10–12 | 8–14 | 7–15 | 7–14–1 | 5–17 | — | 5–17 | 11–11–1 |
| St. Louis | 13–9 | 15–7 | 5–17 | 10–12 | 9–13 | 17–5 | — | 12–10 |
| Washington | 13–9 | 16–6 | 10–12 | 12–10 | 8–13 | 11–11–1 | 10–12 | — |

=== Opening Day lineup ===
| Ossie Vitt | 3B |
| Eddie Foster | 2B |
| Mike Menosky | LF |
| Tim Hendryx | RF |
| Stuffy McInnis | 1B |
| Shano Collins | CF |
| Everett Scott | SS |
| Muddy Ruel | C |
| Sad Sam Jones | P |

=== Roster ===
1921 Boston Red Sox
Roster
| Pitchers: Joe Bush; Sam Dodge; Curt Fullerton; Sad Sam Jones; Benn Karr; Elmer Myers; Herb Pennock; Allen Russell; Allen Sothoron; Hank Thormahlen | Catchers: Ed Chaplin; Muddy Ruel; Roxy Walters; Infielders: Eddie Foster; Stuffy McInnis; Del Pratt; Everett Scott; Ossie Vitt | Outfielders: Shano Collins; Tim Hendryx; Nemo Leibold; Mike Menosky; Ernie Neitzke; John Perrin; Pinky Pittenger; Sammy Vick; Other batters: Hob Hiller | Manager: Hugh Duffy; Coaches: Jimmy Burke (Pitching) |

== Player stats ==
=== Batting ===
==== Starters by position ====
Note: Pos = Position; G = Games played; AB = At bats; H = Hits; Avg. = Batting average; HR = Home runs; RBI = Runs batted in

| Pos | Player | G | AB | H | Avg. | HR | RBI |
|---|---|---|---|---|---|---|---|
| C | Muddy Ruel | 113 | 358 | 99 | .277 | 1 | 45 |
| 1B | Stuffy McInnis | 152 | 584 | 179 | .307 | 0 | 76 |
| 2B | Del Pratt | 135 | 521 | 169 | .324 | 5 | 102 |
| SS | Everett Scott | 154 | 576 | 151 | .262 | 1 | 62 |
| 3B | Eddie Foster | 120 | 412 | 117 | .284 | 0 | 35 |
| OF | Nemo Leibold | 123 | 467 | 143 | .306 | 0 | 31 |
| OF | Mike Menosky | 133 | 477 | 143 | .300 | 3 | 45 |
| OF | Shano Collins | 141 | 542 | 155 | .286 | 4 | 69 |

==== Other batters ====
Note: G = Games played; AB = At bats; H = Hits; Avg. = Batting average; HR = Home runs; RBI = Runs batted in

| Player | G | AB | H | Avg. | HR | RBI |
|---|---|---|---|---|---|---|
| Ossie Vitt | 78 | 232 | 44 | .190 | 0 | 13 |
| Roxy Walters | 54 | 169 | 34 | .201 | 0 | 14 |
| Tim Hendryx | 49 | 137 | 33 | .241 | 0 | 22 |
| Pinky Pittenger | 40 | 91 | 18 | .198 | 0 | 5 |
| Sammy Vick | 44 | 77 | 20 | .260 | 0 | 9 |
| Ernie Neitzke | 11 | 25 | 6 | .240 | 0 | 2 |
| John Perrin | 4 | 13 | 3 | .231 | 0 | 1 |
| Ed Chaplin | 3 | 2 | 0 | .000 | 0 | 0 |
| Hob Hiller | 1 | 1 | 0 | .000 | 0 | 0 |

=== Pitching ===
==== Starting pitchers ====
Note: G = Games pitched; IP = Innings pitched; W = Wins; L = Losses; ERA = Earned run average; SO = Strikeouts

| Player | G | IP | W | L | ERA | SO |
|---|---|---|---|---|---|---|
| Sam Jones | 40 | 298.2 | 23 | 16 | 3.22 | 98 |
| Joe Bush | 37 | 235.1 | 16 | 9 | 3.50 | 96 |
| Herb Pennock | 32 | 222.2 | 13 | 14 | 4.04 | 91 |
| Elmer Myers | 30 | 172.0 | 8 | 12 | 4.87 | 40 |
| Allan Sothoron | 2 | 6.0 | 0 | 2 | 13.50 | 2 |

==== Other pitchers ====
Note: G = Games pitched; IP = Innings pitched; W = Wins; L = Losses; ERA = Earned run average; SO = Strikeouts

| Player | G | IP | W | L | ERA | SO |
|---|---|---|---|---|---|---|
| Allen Russell | 39 | 173.0 | 6 | 11 | 4.11 | 60 |
| Benn Karr | 26 | 117.2 | 8 | 7 | 3.67 | 37 |
| Hank Thormahlen | 23 | 96.1 | 1 | 7 | 4.48 | 17 |
| Curt Fullerton | 4 | 15.1 | 0 | 1 | 8.80 | 4 |

==== Relief pitchers ====
Note: G = Games pitched; W = Wins; L = Losses; SV = Saves; ERA = Earned run average; SO = Strikeouts

| Player | G | W | L | SV | ERA | SO |
|---|---|---|---|---|---|---|
| Ernie Neitzke | 2 | 0 | 0 | 0 | 6.14 | 1 |
| Sam Dodge | 1 | 0 | 0 | 0 | 9.00 | 0 |
