= 1917 Atlanta Crackers season =

1917 Atlanta Crackers
- League: Southern Association
- Ballpark: Ponce de Leon Park
- City: Atlanta, Georgia
- Record: 98–56
- League place: 1st
- Managers: Charlie Frank

The 1917 Atlanta Crackers season represented the Atlanta Crackers baseball team in the Southern Association and won the league pennant. The team played its games at Ponce de Leon Park, and was managed by Charlie Frank. Roy Moran led the league in hits, and Jake Munch was second. When Moran's house burned down, fans staged a day in his honor. Pitcher Rube Bressler went 25–15.
