= Ernie Neitzke =

American baseball player (1894–1977)

- Outfielder / Pitcher
- Born: November 13, 1894; Toledo, Ohio, U.S.
- Died: April 27, 1977 (aged 82); Sylvania, Ohio, U.S.
- Batted: Right Threw: Right

MLB debut
- June 2, 1921, for the Boston Red Sox

Last MLB appearance
- October 2, 1921, for the Boston Red Sox

MLB statistics
- Batting average: .240
- Earned run average: 6.14
- Runs batted in: 2
- Stats at Baseball Reference

Teams
- Boston Red Sox (1921)

Ernest Fredrich Neitzke (November 13, 1894 – April 27, 1977) was an American utility player in Major League Baseball who played briefly for the Boston Red Sox during the 1921 season. Listed at 5 ft 10 in (1.78 m), 180 lb., Neitzke batted and threw right-handed. He was born in Toledo, Ohio.

Little is known about this outfielder/pitcher who played on a Red Sox uniform with few stars. Neitzke made eight outfield appearances at left field (4), right (3) and center (1), and also pitched 7 2/3 innings of relief in two games, collecting a 6.14 ERA with one strikeout. four walks, and eight hits allowed without a decision.

In an 11-game career, Neitzke was a .240 hitter (6-for-25) with three runs, two RBI, and a .345 on-base percentage without an extra-base hit.

Neitzke died at the age of 82 in Sylvania, Ohio.

== See also ==
- 1921 Boston Red Sox season
