= John Wilson (1910s pitcher) =

American baseball player (1890-1954)

- Pitcher
- Born: June 15, 1890; Boonsboro, Maryland
- Died: September 23, 1954 (aged 64); Annapolis, Maryland
- Batted: Right Threw: Left

MLB debut
- June 11, 1913, for the Washington Senators

Last MLB appearance
- June 26, 1913, for the Washington Senators

MLB statistics
- Win–loss record: 0–0
- Earned run average: 4.50
- Strikeouts: 1
- Stats at Baseball Reference

Teams
- Washington Senators (1913)

John Nicodemus Wilson (June 15, 1890 – September 23, 1954) was a professional baseball pitcher. He pitched in three games in Major League Baseball for the Washington Senators during its 1913 season.
