= Henri Rondeau =

American baseball player (1887–1943)

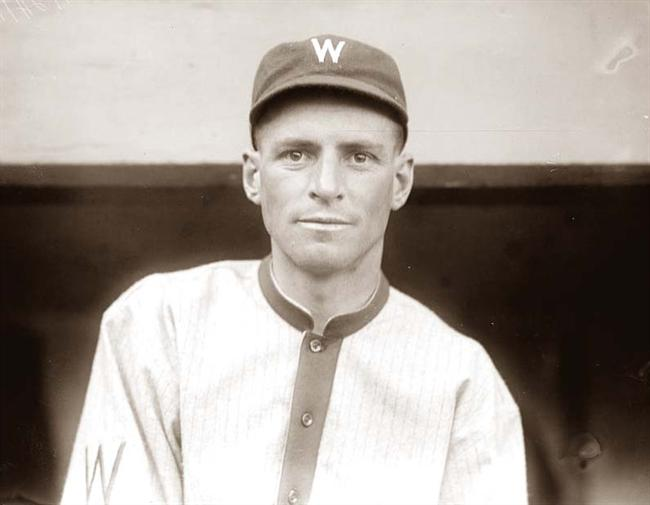
- Henri Rondeau, Washington Senators, 1916
- Outfielder / Catcher
- Born: May 5, 1887; Danielson, Connecticut, U.S.
- Died: May 28, 1943 (aged 56); Woonsocket, Rhode Island, U.S.
- Batted: Left Threw: Right

MLB debut
- April 11, 1913, for the Detroit Tigers

Last MLB appearance
- July 1, 1916, for the Washington Senators

MLB statistics
- Batting average: .206
- Home runs: 1
- Runs batted in: 37
- Stats at Baseball Reference

Teams
- Detroit Tigers (1913); Washington Senators (1915–1916)

Henri Joseph Rondeau (May 5, 1887 – May 28, 1943) was an American baseball player. He played professional baseball as an outfielder and a catcher for 17 years from 1909 to 1925, including parts of three seasons in Major League Baseball for the Detroit Tigers in 1913 and the Washington Senators from 1915 to 1916. He also played in all or parts of 12 seasons with the Minneapolis Millers in the American Association.

== Early years ==
Rondeau was born in Danielson, Connecticut, in 1887. He played baseball as a boy in Danielson and began playing organized baseball as a second baseman for the Perseverance team out of Woonsocket, Rhode Island, in the Mill League.

== Professional baseball ==
=== Minor leagues ===
In 1909, while playing for the Perseverance team, Rondeau was discovered by Jesse Burkett and signed to play with his Worcester Busters team in the New England League. He played for Worcester, principally as a first baseman but also as an outfielder, in 1909 and 1910. Late in the 1910 season, after injuries to the Worcester catchers, Burkett moved Rondeau to that position. In 1911, he was sold to the Providence Grays in the Eastern League. After the 1911 season, he was traded to the Jersey City Skeeters of the International League. He compiled a .311 batting average in 90 games for the Skeeters.

=== Detroit Tigers ===
On September 16, 1912, Rondeau was drafted by the Washington Senators in the Rule 5 draft, but the Senators then sold him to the Detroit Tigers two days later for $4,000. After watching him earn the backup catcher position during spring training, E. A. Batchelor of the Detroit Free Press described Rondeau as a "scrappy" player who regularly engaged in heated dialogue with umpires over ball and strike calls – a fighting spirit that Batchelor concluded would make Rondeau valuable to the Tigers. Rondeau appeared in 36 games for the 1913 Detroit Tigers, including 12 games as the team's starting catcher and four games as the starting first baseman. He compiled a .186 batting average with the Tigers. In August 1913, he suffered sun stroke and was hospitalized for several days.

=== Minneapolis ===
After his release from the hospital, he was traded by the Tigers to the Minneapolis Millers of the American Association. He hit .378 for Minneapolis in 19 games at the end of the 1913 season and continued to play well for Minneapolis in 1914, appearing in 150 games with a .308 batting average and .412 on-base percentage. He was converted from a catcher to an outfielder in July 1914 by Minneapolis manager Joe Cantillon.

=== Washington Senators ===
In August 1914, the Millers traded Rondeau to Washington Senators. Clark Griffith of the Senators parted with four major league players in exchange for Rondeau, making him the most expensive recruit for the 1915 Senators. Rondeau appeared in only 14 games with the Senators in 1915, 11 as the team's starting left fielder and the others as a pinch-hitter, as his batting average plummeted to a career low .175 against big league pitching.

On May 10, 1915, after a poor performance in his tryout with the Senators, Rondeau was sold by the Senators to the Minneapolis Millers. Clark Griffith stated at the time that he had given Rondeau a fair trial. He compiled a .333 batting average in 129 games for the Millers.

After another strong season with Minneapolis, Rondeau returned to the Senators in 1916. He appeared in 50 games, 33 as a left fielder and 17 as a right fielder, and compiled a .222 batting average and .311 on-base percentage. He appeared in his last major league game on July 1, 1916. On July 5, 1916, Rondeau was returned to the Millers.

In three major league seasons, Rondeau had a .206 batting average and .311 on-base percentage in 99 games and 272 at bats. He played 59 of his major league games as an outfielder and 16 games as a catcher. As of the end of the 2015 season, Rondeau is the only major league baseball player in history named "Henri".

=== Minneapolis ===
Rondeau returned in July 1916 for a third run with Minneapolis in between stints with the Washington Senators. This time, Rondeau remained with the Millers as a starting outfielder for nine more years, running through the 1924 season. He compiled a career high .382 batting average in 16 games during the 1916 season. In all, he batted over .300 seven times for the Millers: .382 in 1916, .378 in 1913, .333 in 1915 and 1920, .312 in 1923, .308 in 1914, and .302 in 1924. Rondeau was one of 42 players from 1902 to 1952 to play in 10 or more seasons as a member of the American Association. Minnesota manager Joe Cantillon in 1921 referred to Rondeau as "an institution" with the team.

=== Little Rock and Hartford ===
After leaving the Millers, Rondeau played one more minor league season in 1925, splitting the season between the Little Rock Travelers and the Hartford Senators. On September 1, 1925, while playing for Hartford, he collapsed during the eighth inning of a game and was carried to the clubhouse by his fellow players. A doctor stated that Rondeau had suffered a heart attack.

== Later years ==
Rondeau died in 1943 after a long illness at age 56 at his home in Woonsocket, Rhode Island. He was buried at Precious Blood Cemetery in Woonsocket.
