= Horace Milan =

American baseball player (1894-1955)

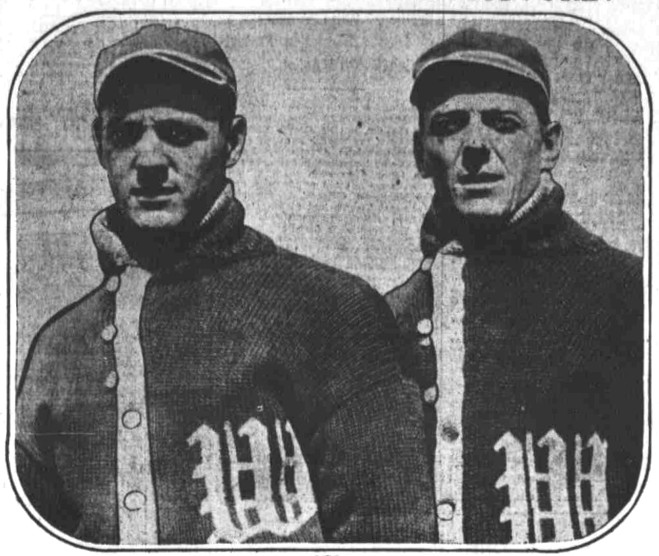
- Horace (left) & his brother Clyde Milan (right)
- Outfielder
- Born: April 7, 1894; Linden, Tennessee, U.S.
- Died: June 29, 1955 (aged 61); Texarkana, Arkansas, U.S.
- Batted: Right Threw: Right

MLB debut
- August 29, 1915, for the Washington Senators

Last MLB appearance
- September 29, 1917, for the Washington Senators

MLB statistics
- Batting average: .320
- Home runs: 0
- Runs batted in: 16
- Stats at Baseball Reference

Teams
- Washington Senators (1915, 1917)

Horace Robert Milan (April 7, 1894 – June 29, 1955) was an American professional baseball outfielder who played from 1913 to 1917. He appeared in 42 total games in Major League Baseball during 1915 and 1917 trials with the Washington Senators, where his elder brother Clyde was a teammate. Born in Linden, Tennessee, Horace Milan threw and batted right-handed and was listed as 5 feet 9 inches (1.75 m) tall and 175 pounds (79 kg).

In his 42-game MLB career, Milan collected 32 hits, including four doubles and two triples; he drove in 16 runs. He also stole six bases in part-time duty.

Milan scouted for the Washington organization after his playing career.
