= Mike Menosky =

American baseball player (1894–1983)

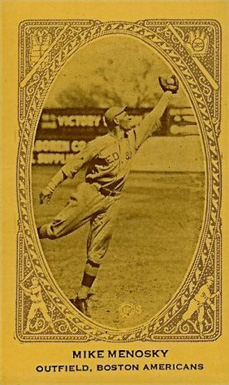
- Left fielder
- Born: October 16, 1894; Glen Campbell, Pennsylvania, U.S.
- Died: April 11, 1983 (aged 88); Detroit, Michigan, U.S.
- Batted: Left Threw: Right

MLB debut
- April 18, 1914, for the Pittsburgh Rebels

Last MLB appearance
- October 7, 1923, for the Boston Red Sox

MLB statistics
- Batting average: .278
- Home runs: 18
- Runs batted in: 252
- Stats at Baseball Reference

Teams
- Pittsburgh Rebels (1914–1915); Washington Senators (1916–1917, 1919); Boston Red Sox (1920–1923)

Michael William Menosky (October 16, 1894 – April 11, 1983) was an American professional baseball player who was an outfielder for the Federal League and Major League Baseball. Born in Glen Campbell, Pennsylvania, he was known as "Leaping Mike" for his daring, fence-crashing catches. Menosky started his career on April 18, 1914, with the Pittsburgh Rebels of the Federal League, and went on to play 68 games that season. At 19, he was the second-youngest baseball player in the Federal League that season behind Jimmy Smith. He spent most of the 1915 season in the minor leagues of the Federal League. After the league folded in 1915, he was purchased by the Washington Senators of the American League on February 10, 1916.

After playing 11 games in 1916, he became the starting left fielder in 1917. He hit ten triples that season, and stole 22 bases. After taking a year off from baseball to serve in the military, he was again the starting left fielder during the 1919 season for the Senators. After the season ended, Menosky was traded on January 20, 1920, with Eddie Foster and Harry Harper to the Boston Red Sox for Braggo Roth and Red Shannon. He remained the starting left fielder on the Boston Red Sox for the 1920 and 1921 seasons. He had his best statistical season during the 1920 Boston Red Sox season, where he played in 141 games, had a batting average of .297, hit nine triples, and stole 23 bases, which was good for fourth in the American League. During the 1921 Boston Red Sox season, he had a career-high batting average of .300. In 1922, he was named the opening day starter as a center fielder, having played the previous two seasons in left field. He went on to play only four games in center field that season out of the 103 he played.

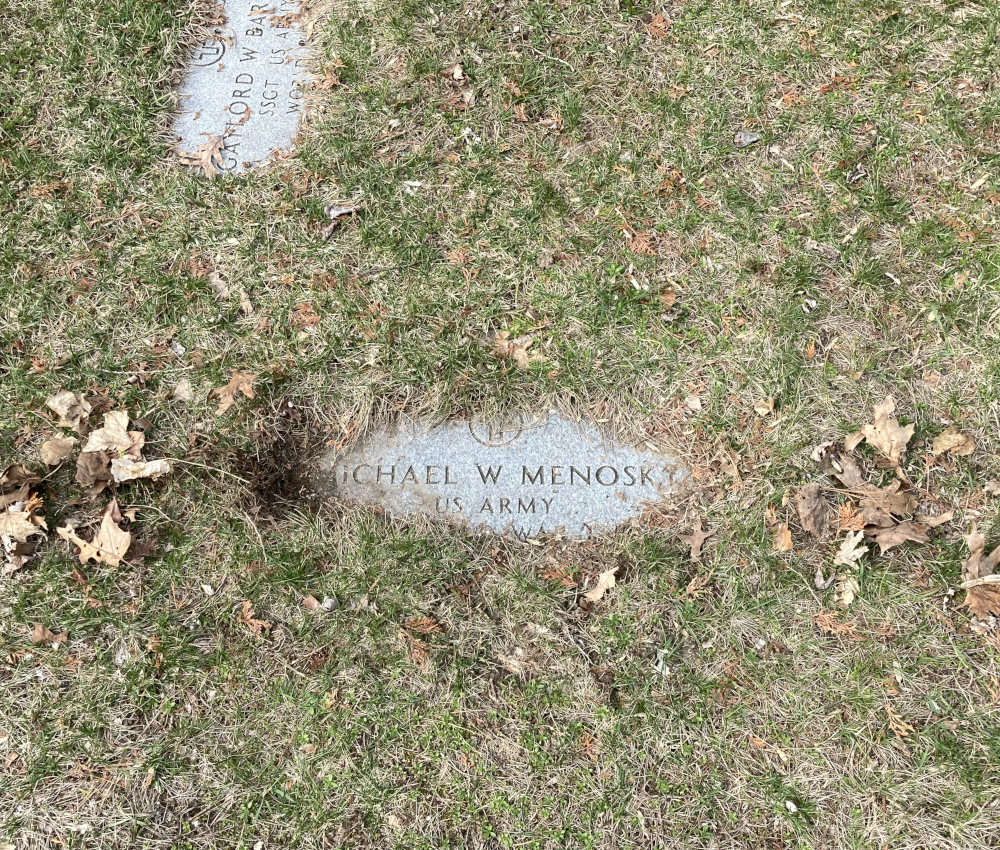
Menosky's grave at Holy Sepulchre Cemetery

Menosky went on to play one more season with the Red Sox, playing in 84 games in 1923. At the end of the season, he was released to the Vernon club of the Pacific Coast League, ending his Major League career.

In 810 games over nine seasons, Menosky posted a .278 batting average (685-for-2465) with 382 runs, 18 home runs and 252 RBIs. Defensively, he recorded a .967 fielding percentage playing at all three outfield positions.

After his retirement from baseball, he became a probation officer. His baseball career came of use in a case where the defendant was charged with throwing a rock through a Detroit terminal caboose window. The judge doubted he could throw a rock 250 feet, and when Menosky tried to throw a rock 250 feet and was unable to do so, the judge dismissed the case, stating that the average man would not have a chance if Menosky could not do it.

Menosky died in Detroit, Michigan on April 11, 1983, and was buried at Holy Sepulchre Cemetery in Southfield.
