= Lefty Schegg =

American baseball player (1889-1963)

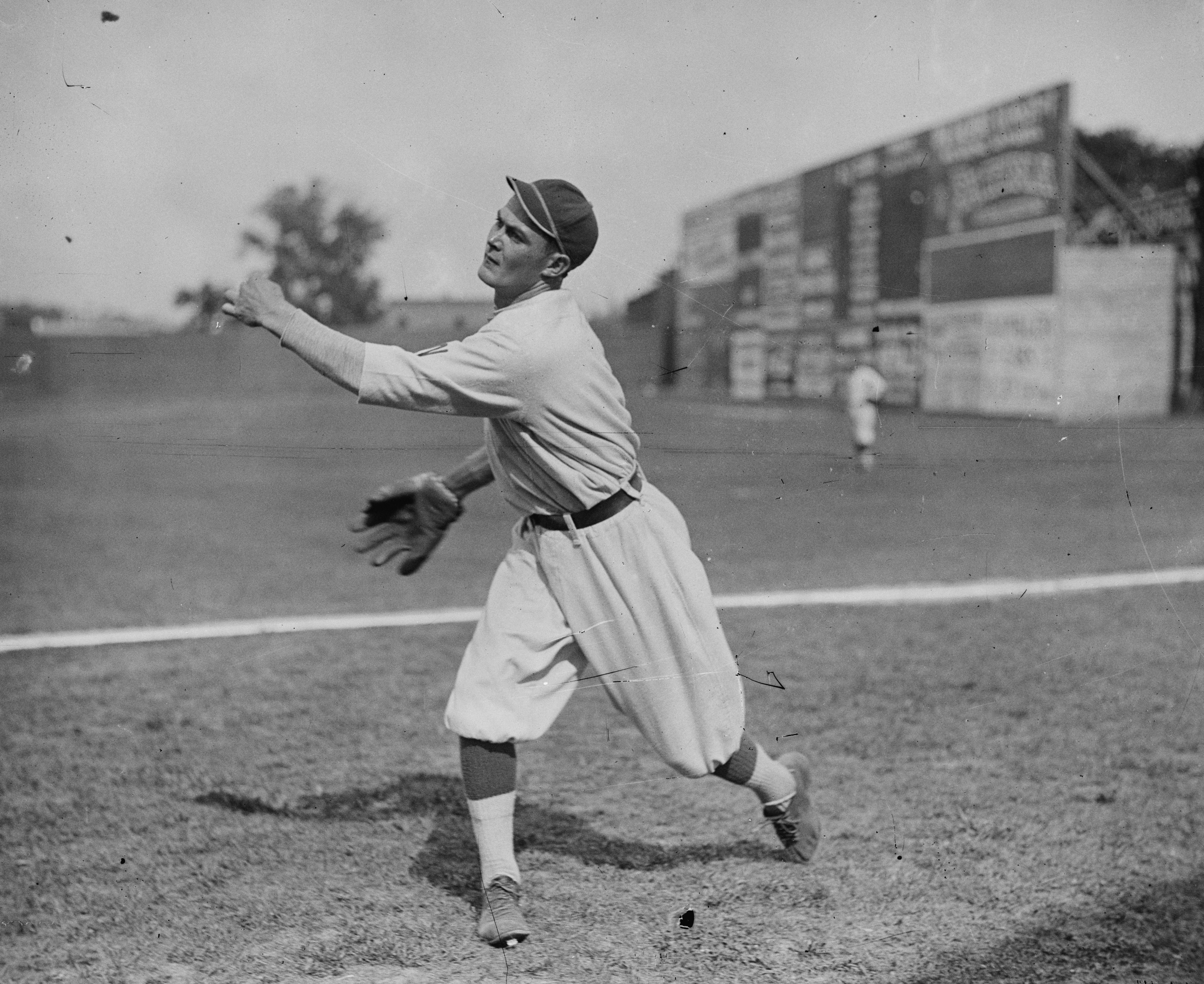
- Pitcher
- Born: August 29, 1889; Leesville, Ohio
- Died: February 27, 1963 (aged 73); Niles, Ohio
- Batted: Left Threw: Left

MLB debut
- August 20, 1912, for the Washington Senators

Last MLB appearance
- August 27, 1912, for the Washington Senators

MLB statistics
- Games played: 2
- Innings pitched: 5.1
- Earned run average: 3.38
- Stats at Baseball Reference

Teams
- Washington Senators (1912)

Gilbert Eugene "Lefty" Schegg (August 29, 1889 – February 27, 1963) was a pitcher in Major League Baseball. He played for the Washington Senators.
