= Peter McLaughlin (umpire) =

American baseball umpire (1884-1959)

- Born: Peter Joseph McLaughlin; May 16, 1884; Lancaster, England
- Died: December 8, 1959 (aged 75); Holyoke, Massachusetts, U.S.
- Occupation: Umpire
- Years active: 1924-1927
- Employer: National League

Peter Joseph McLaughlin (May 16, 1884 – December 8, 1959) was a professional baseball umpire who worked in the National League from 1924 to 1927. McLaughlin umpired 447 major league games in his four-year career. He also umpired in the Eastern League. In 1933, he umpired in the Cape Cod Baseball League.
