= Molly Craft =

American baseball player (1895-1978)

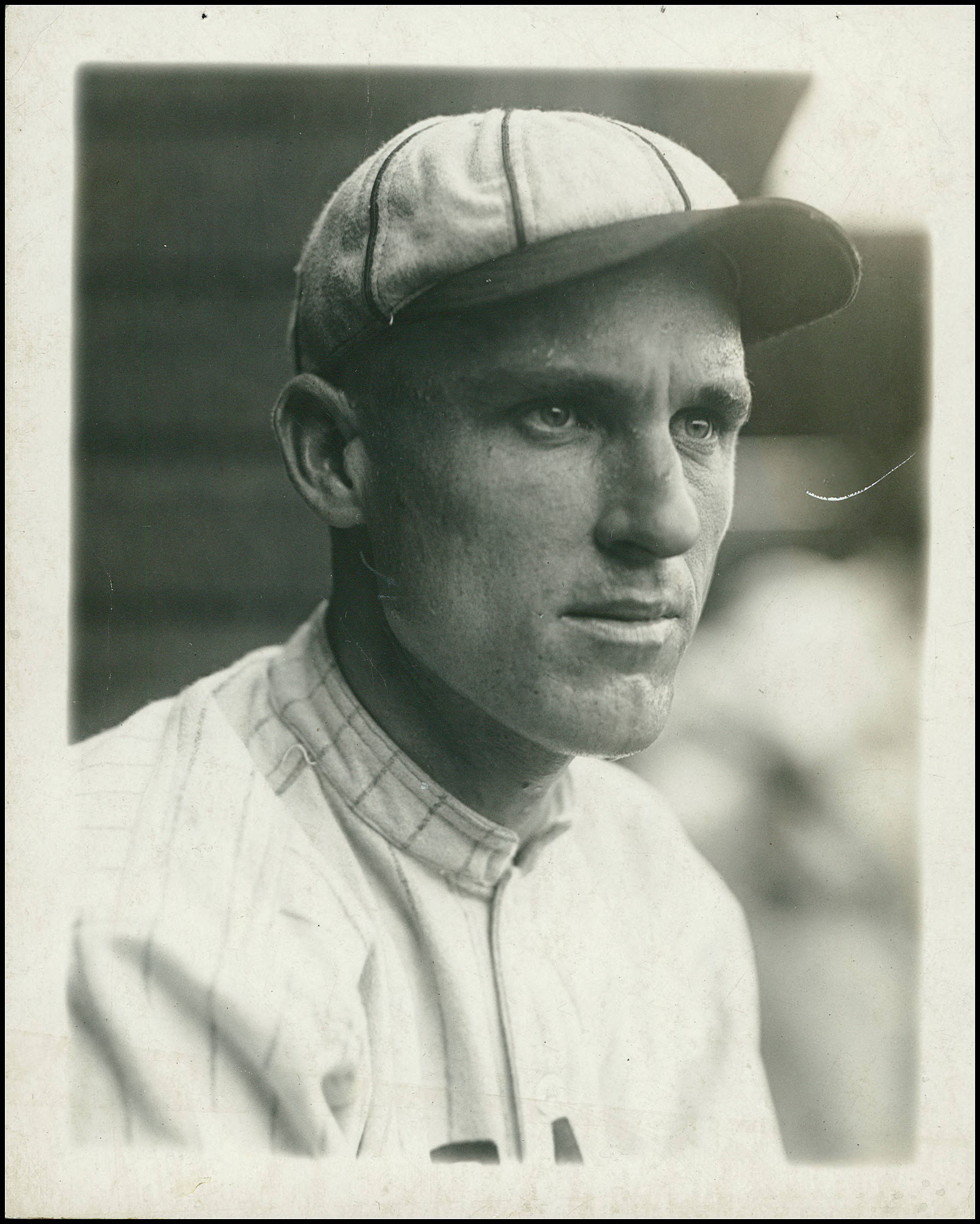
- Pitcher
- Born: November 28, 1895; Portsmouth, Virginia, U.S.
- Died: October 25, 1978 (aged 82); Los Angeles, California, U.S.
- Batted: Right Threw: Right

MLB debut
- August 8, 1916, for the Washington Senators

Last MLB appearance
- July 20, 1919, for the Washington Senators

MLB statistics
- Win–loss record: 0–4
- Earned run average: 3.57
- Strikeouts: 33
- Stats at Baseball Reference

Teams
- Washington Senators (1916–1919)

Maurice Montague "Molly" Craft (November 28, 1895 – October 25, 1978) was an American pitcher in Major League Baseball. He played for the Washington Senators.
