= Herb Herring =

American baseball player (1891-1964)

- Pitcher
- Born: July 22, 1891; Danville, Arkansas
- Died: April 22, 1964 (aged 72); Tucson, Arizona
- Batted: Right Threw: Right

MLB debut
- September 4, 1912, for the Washington Senators

Last MLB appearance
- September 4, 1912, for the Washington Senators

MLB statistics
- Games played: 1
- Innings pitched: 1
- Earned runs: 0
- Stats at Baseball Reference

Teams
- Washington Senators (1912)

Herbert Lee Herring (July 22, 1891 – April 22, 1964) was a pitcher in Major League Baseball. He played for the Washington Senators.
