= Harry Hedgpeth =

American baseball player (1888-1966)

- Pitcher
- Born: September 4, 1888; Fayetteville, North Carolina
- Died: July 30, 1966 (aged 77); Richmond, Virginia
- Batted: Left Threw: Left

MLB debut
- October 3, 1913, for the Washington Senators

Last MLB appearance
- October 3, 1913, for the Washington Senators

MLB statistics
- Games pitched: 1
- Innings pitched: 1.0
- Batters faced: 4
- Stats at Baseball Reference

Teams
- Washington Senators (1913)

Harry Malcolm Hedgpeth (September 4, 1888 – July 30, 1966) was a Major League Baseball pitcher. Hedgepth played in one game for the Washington Senators on October 3, 1913.
