= Roy Moran =

American baseball player

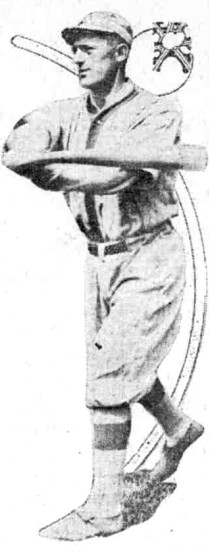
- Left fielder
- Born: September 17, 1884; Vincennes, Indiana, U.S.
- Died: July 18, 1966 (aged 81); Atlanta, Georgia, U.S.
- Batted: Right Threw: Right

MLB debut
- September 3, 1912, for the Washington Senators

Last MLB appearance
- September 15, 1912, for the Washington Senators

MLB statistics
- Games played: 7
- At bats: 13
- Hits: 2
- Stats at Baseball Reference

Teams
- Washington Senators (1912)

Roy Ellis Moran (September 17, 1884 – July 18, 1966), nicknamed "Deedle", was an American Major League Baseball (MLB) left fielder who played for the Washington Senators in 1912. Married: Modo Moran -- Daughter: Muriel Setters -- Grand Daughter: Betty Kenimer -- Great Grandson: Ronald Curland.
