= Turner Barber =

American baseball player (1893–1968)

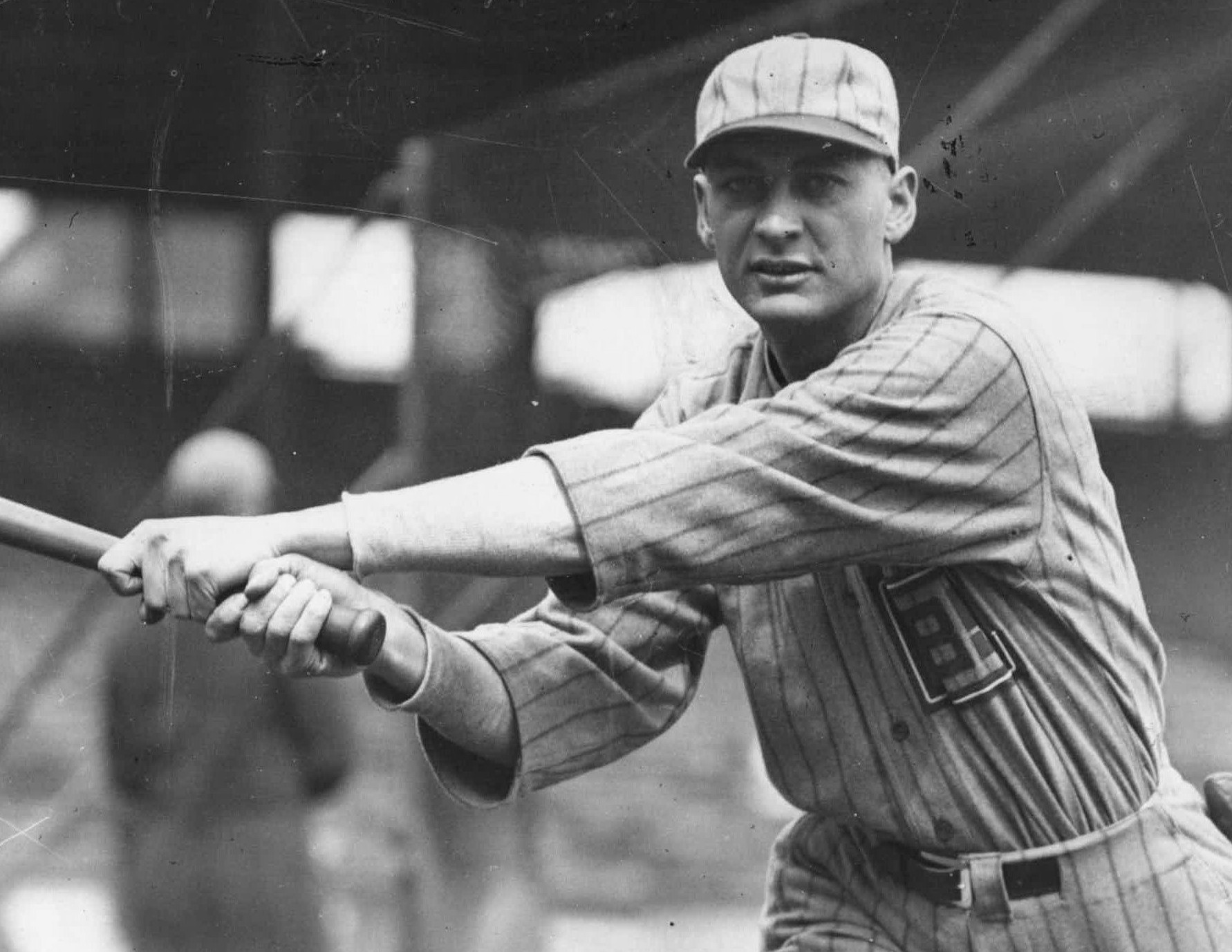
- Outfielder
- Born: July 9, 1893; Lavinia, Tennessee, U.S.
- Died: October 20, 1968 (aged 75); Milan, Tennessee, U.S.
- Batted: Left Threw: Right

MLB debut
- August 19, 1915, for the Washington Senators

Last MLB appearance
- April 30, 1923, for the Brooklyn Robins

MLB statistics
- Batting average: .289
- Home runs: 2
- Runs batted in: 185
- Stats at Baseball Reference

Teams
- Washington Senators (1915–1916); Chicago Cubs (1917–1922); Brooklyn Robins (1923)

Tyrus Turner Barber (July 9, 1893 – October 20, 1968), was an American professional baseball outfielder, who played in Major League Baseball (MLB) from 1915-1923 for the Washington Senators, Chicago Cubs, and Brooklyn Robins.

In 491 games over nine seasons, Barber posted a .289 batting average (442-for-1531) with 189 runs, 2 home runs and 185 RBIs. He finished his career with a .978 fielding percentage playing at all three outfield positions and first base.

Barber died at the age of 75 in Milan, Tennessee.
