= Carl Cashion =

American baseball player (1891–1935)

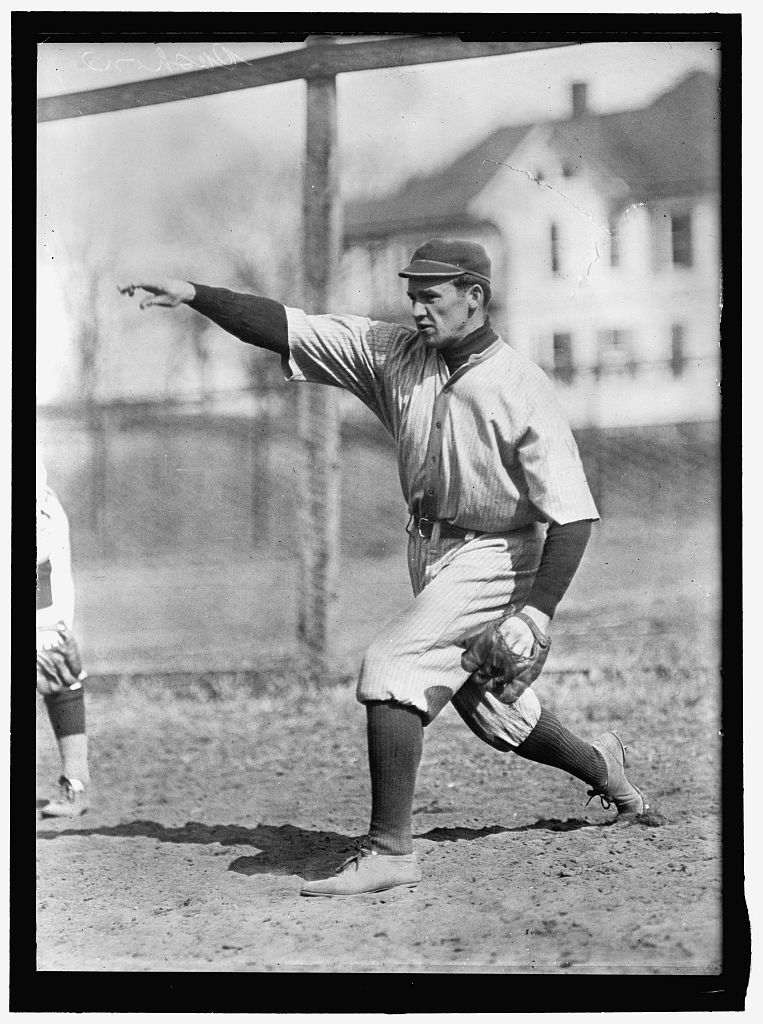
- Pitcher
- Born: June 4, 1889; Huntersville, North Carolina
- Died: November 17, 1935 (aged 46); Iron River, Wisconsin
- Batted: Left Threw: Right

MLB debut
- August 4, 1911, for the Washington Senators

Last MLB appearance
- May 30, 1914, for the Washington Senators

MLB statistics
- Win–loss record: 12-13
- Earned run average: 3.70
- Strikeouts: 114
- Stats at Baseball Reference

Teams
- Washington Senators (1911–1914)

Jay Carl Cashion (June 4, 1889 – November 17, 1935) was a pitcher in Major League Baseball. He played for the Washington Senators from 1911 to 1914. According to Baseball Magazine, Cashion had a fast fastball but was unable to control it.

He is buried in Superior, Wisconsin.
