= Carl Sawyer =

American baseball player (1890–1957)

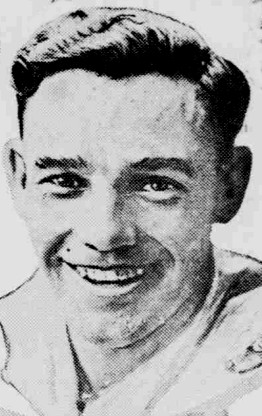
- Infielder
- Born: October 19, 1890; Seattle, Washington
- Died: January 17, 1957 (aged 66); Los Angeles
- Batted: Right Threw: Right

MLB debut
- September 11, 1915, for the Washington Senators

Last MLB appearance
- October 4, 1916, for the Washington Senators

MLB statistics
- Batting average: .222
- Home runs: 0
- Runs batted in: 5
- Stats at Baseball Reference

Teams
- Washington Senators (1915–1916)

Carl Everett Sawyer (October 19, 1890 – January 17, 1957) was an infielder in Major League Baseball. Nicknamed "Huck", he played for the Washington Senators.
