= Joe Boehling =

American baseball player (1891–1941)

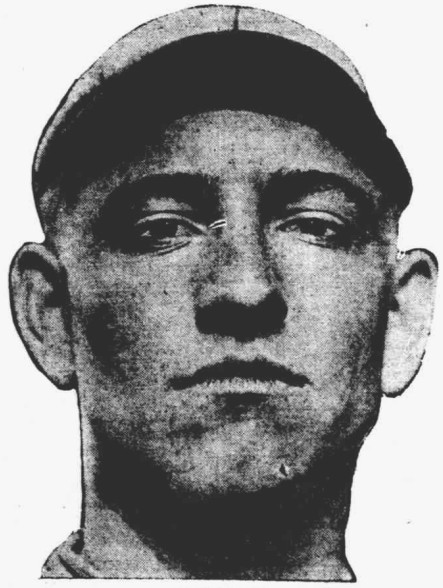
- Pitcher
- Born: March 20, 1891; Richmond, Virginia, U.S.
- Died: September 8, 1941 (aged 50); Richmond, Virginia, U.S.
- Batted: Left Threw: Left

MLB debut
- June 20, 1912, for the Washington Senators

Last MLB appearance
- September 8, 1920, for the Cleveland Indians

MLB statistics
- Win–loss record: 55–50
- Earned run average: 2.97
- Strikeouts: 396
- Stats at Baseball Reference

Teams
- Washington Senators (1912–1916); Cleveland Indians (1916–1917, 1920)

John Joseph Boehling (March 20, 1891 – September 8, 1941) was an American Major League Baseball pitcher for seven seasons. He played with the Washington Senators from 1912 to 1916, and the Cleveland Indians from 1916 to 1920.

Boehling made his major league debut on June 20, 1912, in a 5–0 loss against the Philadelphia Athletics. He went on to play two more games during the 1912 season, finishing with five innings pitched.

In 1913, Boehling was used primarily as a starter alongside Walter Johnson in what was his best season. He pitched in 38 games, starting 25 of them, and finished the season with 18 complete games and three shutouts. He finished with a 17 7 record and an ERA of 2.14. His ERA of 2.14 was sixth in the American League, better than the ERAs of Hall of Famers Chief Bender (2.21) and Rube Marquard (2.50).

In January 1914, Boehling signed a one-year contract to continue playing with the Senators. He played 34 games during the 1914 season, and finished the season with a 12–8 record and a 3.03 ERA.

The 1915 season saw Boehling pitch a career high number of games with 40, 32 of them starts. After a 14–13 record in 1915 and a 9–11 record the following season, the Senators traded Boehling. On August 18, 1916, Boehling was traded along with Danny Moeller to the Cleveland Indians for Elmer Smith and Joe Leonard. He finished the season by pitching in 12 games for the Indians, then pitched in 12 the following season. On July 30, he was sent to the minor leagues by the Indians, and did not play in the major leagues again until 1920. He played in three games for the 1920 Cleveland Indians team that went on to win the World Series, and played his final major league game on June 3, 1920.

He was a better than average hitting pitcher in his major league career, posting a .212 batting average (66-for-312) with 30 runs, 1 home run, 24 RBI and 19 bases on balls. Defensively, he was above average, recording a .952 fielding percentage which was 12 points higher than the league average at his position.

After retiring, Boehling managed an American Legion baseball team in Richmond, Virginia, and worked in the feed and seed business with his brother. He died on September 8, 1941, at the age of 50 as a result of injuries sustained from a fall.
