= John Henry (catcher) =

American baseball player (1889–1941)

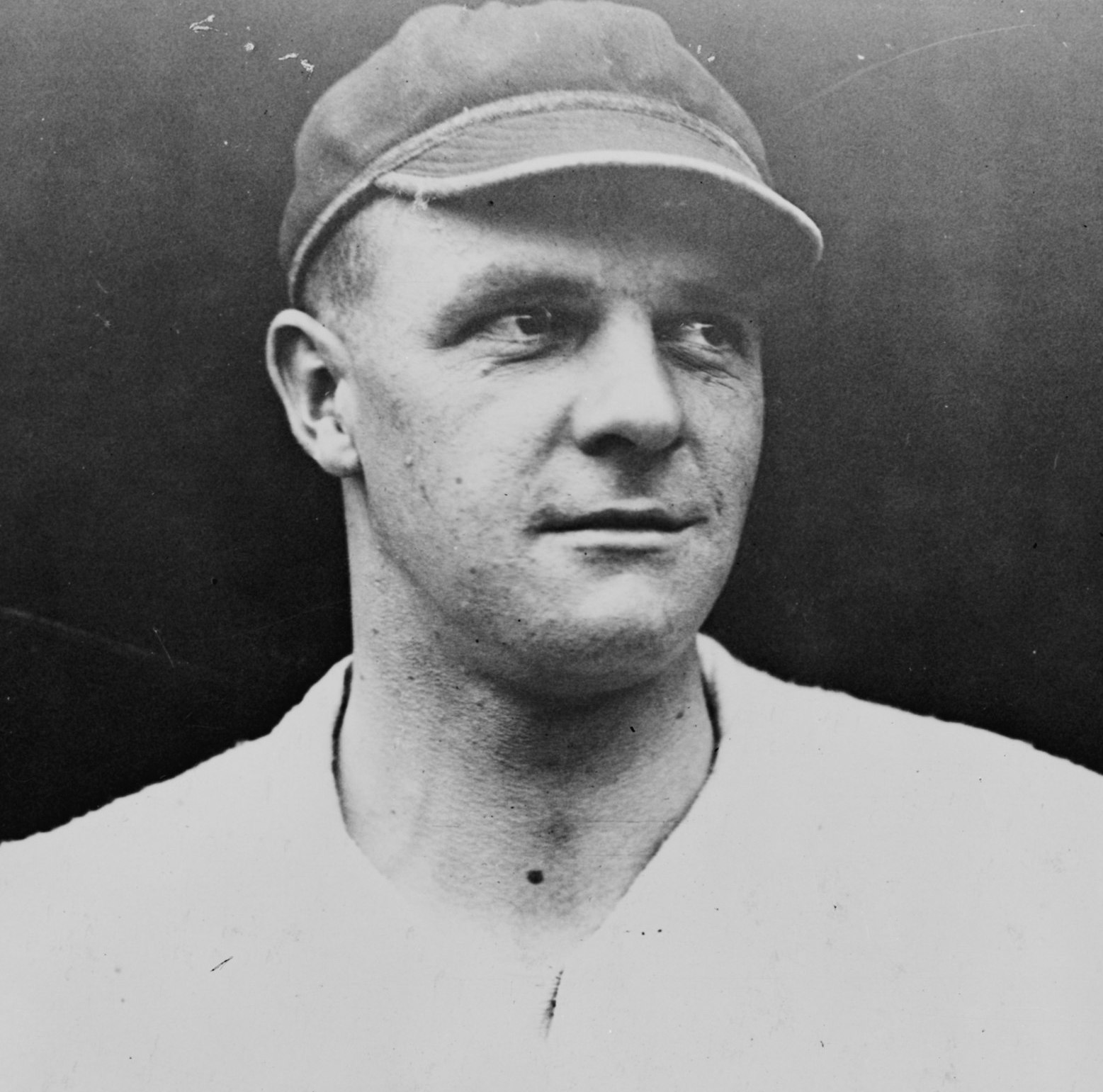
- Catcher
- Born: December 26, 1889; Amherst, Massachusetts, U.S.
- Died: November 24, 1941 (aged 51); Fort Huachuca, Arizona, U.S.
- Batted: Right Threw: Right

MLB debut
- July 8, 1910, for the Washington Senators

Last MLB appearance
- August 10, 1918, for the Boston Braves

MLB statistics
- Batting average: .207
- Runs: 161
- RBI: 171
- Stats at Baseball Reference

Teams
- Washington Senators (1910–1917); Boston Braves (1918)

John Park Henry (December 26, 1889 – November 24, 1941) was an American catcher in Major League Baseball who played for two different teams between the 1910 and 1918 seasons. Listed at 6' 0", 180 lb., Henry batted and threw right-handed.

== Career ==
A native of Amherst, Massachusetts, Henry attended Amherst College, where he played both baseball and ice hockey. He coached the Amherst hockey team during the 1913–14 season.

A classical light-hitting, good defensive catcher, Henry entered the majors in 1910 with the Washington Senators, playing for them seven years before joining the Boston Braves (1918).

Heading into the 1912 season, Senators owner Calvin Griffith traded catcher Gabby Street to the New York Highlanders for third baseman John Knight. Then Henry shared duties with Eddie Ainsmith, serving as the personal catcher for pitcher Walter Johnson. His most productive season came in 1916, when he posted career-numbers in games (117), batting average (.249), runs (28), extrabases (15) and runs batted in (46). Henry would manage to stick around in a part-time role until 1917, when he was sold to the Braves.

In a nine-season career, Henry was a .207 hitter (397-for-1920) with two home runs and 171 RBI in 688 games, including 161 runs, 54 doubles, 15 triples, 55 stolen bases, and a .303 on-base percentage.

Following his playing career, Henry coached at Cornell University and later became a Minor league umpire.

Henry died in Fort Huachuca, Arizona, at the age of 51.

== See also ==
- 1916 Washington Senators season
