= George Dumont =

American baseball player (1895–1956)

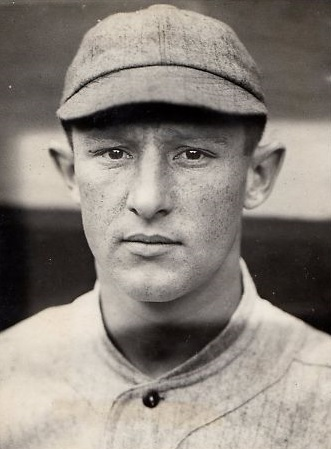
- Pitcher
- Born: November 13, 1895; Minneapolis, Minnesota, U.S.
- Died: October 13, 1956 (aged 60); Minneapolis, Minnesota, U.S.
- Batted: Right Threw: Right

MLB debut
- September 14, 1915, for the Washington Senators

Last MLB appearance
- September 18, 1919, for the Boston Red Sox

MLB statistics
- Win–loss record: 10-23
- Strikeouts: 128
- Earned run average: 2.85
- Stats at Baseball Reference

Teams
- Washington Senators (1915–18); Boston Red Sox (1919)

George Henry Dumont (November 13, 1895 – October 13, 1956), nicknamed "Pea Soup", was an American pitcher in Major League Baseball who played from 1915 through 1919 for the Washington Senators (1915–1918) and Boston Red Sox (1919). Listed at 5 ft 11 in (1.80 m), 163 lb., Dumont batted and threw right-handed. He was born in Minneapolis, Minnesota.

In a five-season career, Dumont posted a 10–23 record with 128 strikeouts and a 2.85 ERA in 77 appearances, including 35 starts, 14 complete games, four shutouts, three saves, and 347 innings pitched.

Dumont died in his home of Minneapolis, Minnesota, at the age of 60.
