= Harry Harper =

American baseball player (1895–1963)

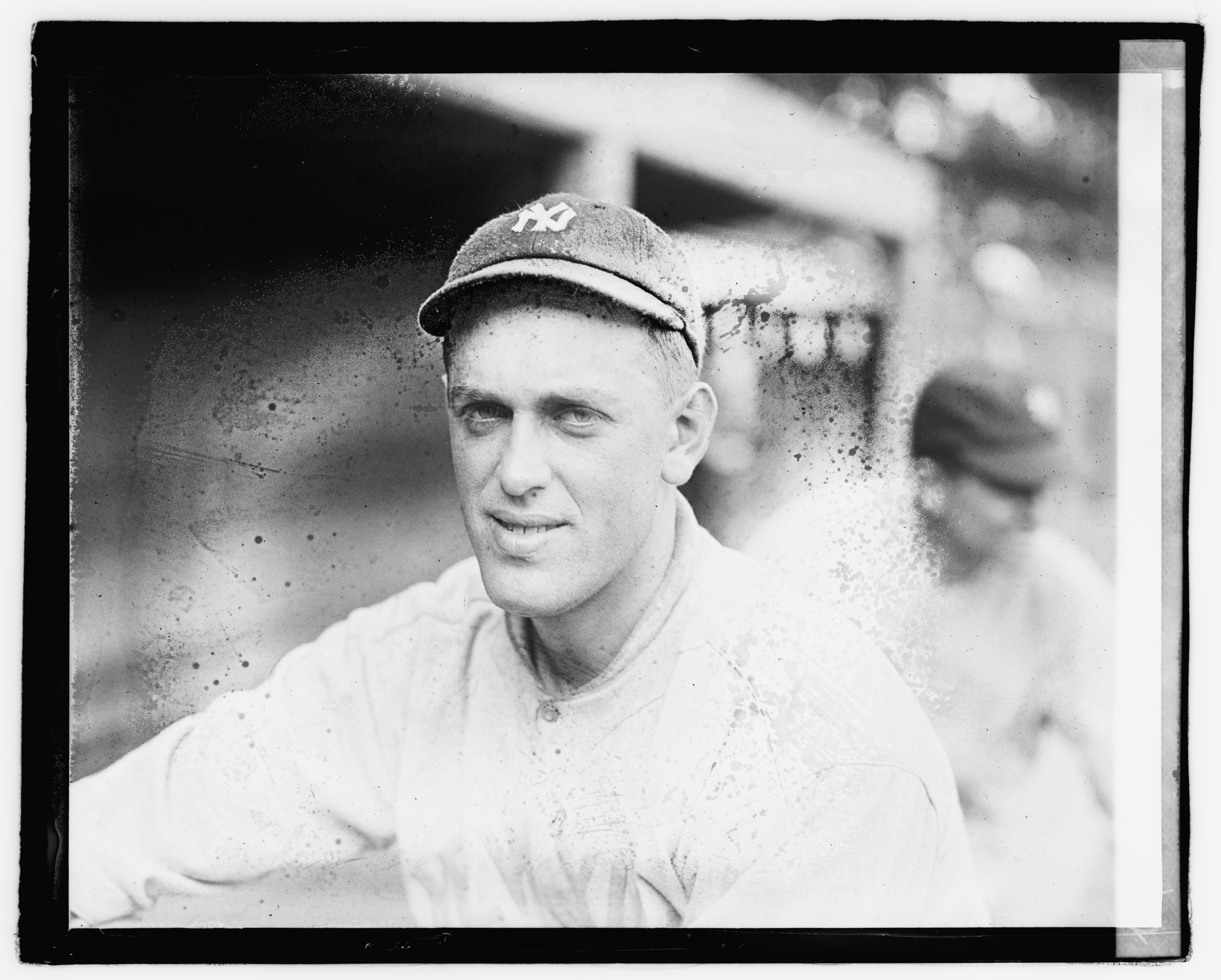
- Harper c. 1915
- Pitcher
- Born: April 24, 1895; Hackensack, New Jersey, U.S.
- Died: April 23, 1963 (aged 67); New York City, New York, U.S.
- Batted: Left Threw: Left

MLB debut
- June 27, 1913, for the Washington Senators

Last MLB appearance
- May 8, 1923, for the Brooklyn Robins

MLB statistics
- Win–loss record: 57–76
- Earned run average: 2.87
- Strikeouts: 623
- Stats at Baseball Reference

Teams
- Washington Senators (1913–1919); Boston Red Sox (1920); New York Yankees (1921); Brooklyn Robins (1923)
New Jersey Commissioner of Labor and Industry
In office 1944–1950
Bergen County Sheriff
In office 1927–1931
Preceded by	Mort O'Donnell
Succeeded by	Mort O'Donnell
Personal details
Party	Republican
Occupation	Politician; baseball player

Harry Clayton Harper (April 24, 1895 – April 23, 1963) was an American professional baseball pitcher, businessman, and politician. He played in Major League Baseball for the Washington Senators, Boston Red Sox, New York Yankees, and Brooklyn Robins between 1913 and 1923. Harper started Game 6 of the 1922 World Series for the Yankees.

Harper was from Hackensack, New Jersey, and was often called "Hackensack Harry" during and after his baseball career. Harper invested his salaries in his business career while he was a baseball player. After retiring from baseball, Harper entered politics, and won election as sheriff of Bergen County as a Republican. He served in the cabinets of Governors Walter Evans Edge and Alfred E. Driscoll, as the Commissioner of Labor and Industry. He also lost elections to the New Jersey Legislature and United States Congress.

== Early life ==
Harper was born on April 24, 1895, in Hackensack, New Jersey, to Elizabeth (née Van Saren) and Henry Clay Harper. He was the second of three sons born to the couple. He started earning money through selling newspapers, coffee, and tea when he was ten years old. Harper's father died when he was 13 years old, and he dropped out of school after the eighth grade to work in a factory in New York City, earning $7 per week ($251 in current dollar terms).

== Baseball career ==
=== Washington Senators ===
Harper also earned money by playing in semi-professional baseball in Hackensack. Former Major League Baseball (MLB) player George Davis watched Harper throw a no-hitter in 1913, when Harper was 18 years old, and scouted Harper for the Washington Senators of the American League. They convinced his mother to give permission for Harper to join the team. Harper made his MLB debut for the Senators on June 27, 1913, pitching three innings as a relief pitcher. He played in four games during the 1913 season, with a 3.55 earned run average (ERA) in 12 2/3 innings pitched.

Harper signed a contract with the Senators in 1914 that contained a clause barring him from pitching on Sundays. He had a 2–1 win–loss record and a 3.47 ERA in 57 innings in 1914, but also committed three errors in 14 total chances. When the Senators needed to reduce their roster size by a mid-May deadline in 1915, they sent Harper to the Minneapolis Millers of the Class AA American Association. He threw a no-hitter for Minneapolis in May, and had a 7–9 record with a 2.81 ERA in 154 innings, while issuing 127 walks. He returned to Washington in July. He had a 4–4 record and a 1.77 ERA in 19 games, 10 games started, for Washington in 1915.

Throughout his career, Harper was a bad-luck pitcher either due to injury or playing on a bad baseball team. He played for the Senators for seven seasons. His most productive season came in 1916 with Washington, when he posted career numbers in wins (14), strikeouts (149) and innings pitched (249 1/3), while recording a 2.45 ERA. Harper had a 11–12 record and a 3.01 ERA in 31 games, all starts. In 1918, Harper went 11–10 in 244 innings, His 2.18 ERA ranked him sixth between the American League pitchers, while his 13 wild pitches led the league. He had a 6–21 record with a 3.72 ERA for the Senators in 1919; his 21 losses led the league.

=== Later career ===
After the 1919 season, the Senators traded Harper, Eddie Foster and Mike Menosky to the Boston Red Sox for Braggo Roth and Red Shannon. He had a 5–14 record with a 3.04 ERA for the Red Sox in 1920, which was seventh-best in the league. After the 1920 season, the Red Sox traded Harper, Waite Hoyt, Mike McNally, and Wally Schang to the New York Yankees for Del Pratt, Muddy Ruel, Hank Thormahlen, and Sammy Vick. In his first start for the Yankees, on May 13, his thumb was broken by a line drive hit by Eddie Ainsmith. He did not return to the Yankees until August. He started six games for the Yankees in September, finishing the season with a 4–3 record and a 3.76 ERA. The Yankees won the American League pennant and Harper started Game 6 of the 1921 World Series, but did not earn a decision.

The Yankees did not use Harper in a game during the 1922 season due to an injury to his pitching hand, and he was released by the team in June 1922. He pitched for a semi-professional team in Hackensack after he was released. Harper signed with the Brooklyn Robins for the 1923 season. He pitched in one game for Brooklyn before he was released, and he returned to playing semi-professional baseball. In May 1924, he joined the Reading Keystones of the Class AA International League. He continued to pitch and manage in semi-professional baseball for a team based in Hackensack.

In a 10-season career, Harper posted a 57–76 record with 623 strikeouts and a 2.87 ERA in 219 appearances, including 171 games started, 66 complete games, 12 shutouts, five saves in 1,256 innings pitched.

== Political and business career ==
With the salary that he drew from the Senators in 1913, Harper purchased a truck and opened a garbage collection business. His fiancé compelled him to sell the business before they married. Harper formed a trucking business in 1922, and requested a leave of absence from the Yankees to pursue it. The company expanded into construction, helped build the Holland Tunnel and moved pipe that was laid from the Catskill Mountains to New York City.

In 1925, Harper was elected president of the Hackensack chapter of the Kiwanis Club. He entered local politics in 1927 with a campaign for sheriff of Bergen County as a Republican. He defeated Mort O'Connell, the political boss of the Bergen County Democratic Party by around 10,000 votes. He served a three-year term as sheriff, and ran in a special election for the New Jersey Senate in 1931, following the expulsion of Ralph W. Chandless. Harper won the Republican nomination by defeating County Judge John Zabriskie with 61% of the vote. Harper lost the general election to William H. J. Ely, a Bergen County District Judge, 52%–48%, during what was a difficult year for Republicans due to the unpopularity of President Herbert Hoover's economic policies.

In 1934, Governor Harold G. Hoffman appointed Harper to serve on the New Jersey Civil Service Commission. He remained in that role for a decade, until Governor Walter Evans Edge appointed him Commissioner of Labor and Industry in 1944. Alfred E. Driscoll kept Harper in the position after he was elected governor in 1946.

In 1948, Harper ran for United States Senate seat occupied by Albert W. Hawkes, who was retiring, against Driscoll's wishes. Driscoll endorsed Harper's primary opponent, Robert C. Hendrickson, the New Jersey State Treasurer. Hendrickson won the primary by over 60,000 votes, though Harper carried Bergen County in a landslide. Harper resigned from the state cabinet in order to run in a special election in February 1950 for the United States House of Representatives for New Jersey's 7th congressional district following the resignation of J. Parnell Thomas. He faced William B. Widnall, a member of the New Jersey General Assembly. Though Harper had the support of the Bergen County Republicans, he narrowly lost the primary election to Widnall, 50%–40%, a margin of 402 votes.

== Personal life and family ==
Throughout his baseball career, Harper refused to play on Sundays; he held out from the Red Sox after his trade there in part to ensure that clause was added to his contract.

Harper became engaged to Bessie (née Brewster) of Hackensack, daughter of Sheriff George Brewster, in October 1917. They were married on February 26, 1918. They had a son, George, and a daughter, Elizabeth. George represented Sussex County in the New Jersey Senate and served as New Jersey Auditor from 1964 to 1974. Harry Harper's grandson, George Jr., became mayor of Sandyston.

== Death ==
Later in life, Harper relocated to the Layton section of Sandyston Township, New Jersey.

Harper had surgery at St. Vincent's Hospital in New York, and died in the hospital on April 23, 1963.
