= Jim Shaw (baseball) =

American baseball player (1893-1962)

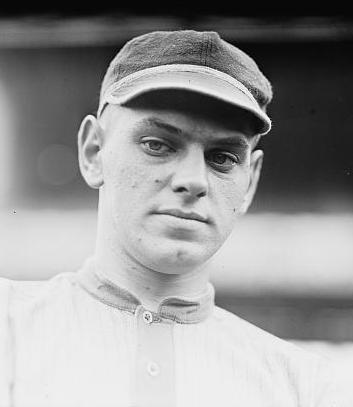
- Pitcher
- Born: August 13, 1893; Pittsburgh, Pennsylvania, U.S.
- Died: January 27, 1962 (aged 68); Washington, D.C., U.S.
- Batted: Right Threw: Right

MLB debut
- September 15, 1913, for the Washington Senators

Last MLB appearance
- July 13, 1921, for the Washington Senators

MLB statistics
- Win–loss record: 84-98
- Earned run average: 3.07
- Strikeouts: 767
- Stats at Baseball Reference

Teams
- Washington Senators (1913–1921)

James Aloysius Shaw (August 13, 1893 – January 27, 1962) was an American pitcher for the Washington Senators (1913–1921) from Pittsburgh, Pennsylvania.

== Career ==
Shaw led the American League in saves (4) and walks allowed (137) in 1914. He led American League in walks allowed in 1917. He led the American League in games (45), saves (5), innings (306 2/3), wild pitches (10) and batters faced (1229) in 1919.

In 9 years, he had a win–loss record of 84–98 in 287 games, started 193 games and had 96 complete games, 17 shutouts, 68 games finished, 17 saves, 1600 1/2 innings pitched, 1446 hits allowed, 674 runs allowed, 546 earned runs allowed, 28 home runs allowed, 688 walks allowed, 767 strikeouts, 24 hit batsmen, 58 wild pitches, 6584 batters faced, 8 balks, and a 3.07 ERA.

He was nicknamed "Grunting" Jim Shaw because of the distinct grunting noise he made every time he threw a pitch off the mound. Shaw lived and raised his family in the Cherrydale neighborhood of Arlington, Virginia. He died in Washington, D.C., at the age of 68.

== See also ==
- List of Major League Baseball annual saves leaders

== Sources ==
- Career statistics from Baseball Reference · Baseball Reference (Minors) · Retrosheet · Baseball Almanac
