= Ray Morgan (baseball) =

American baseball player (1889–1940)

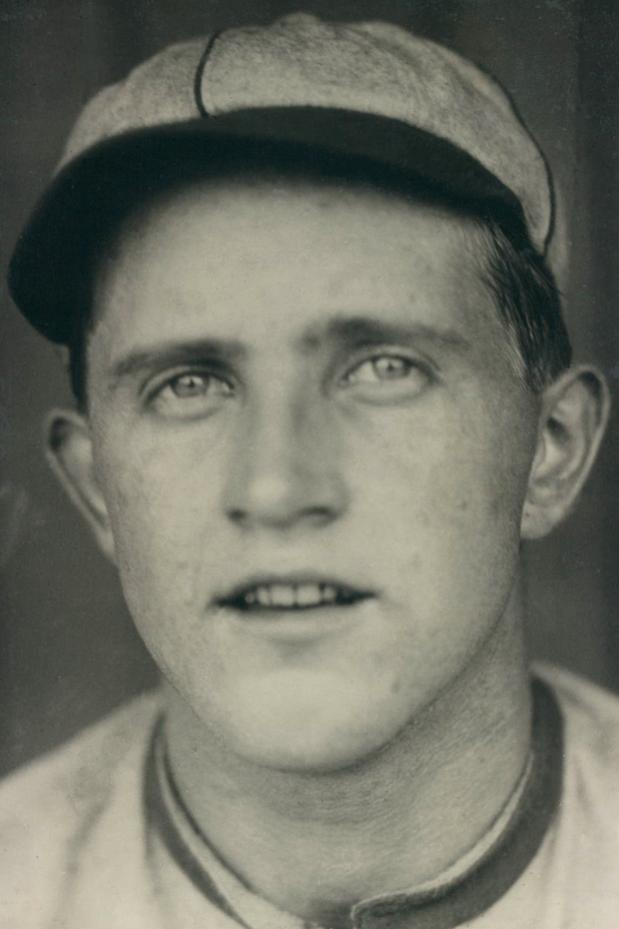
- Second baseman
- Born: June 14, 1889; Baltimore, Maryland, U.S.
- Died: February 15, 1940 (aged 50); Baltimore, Maryland, U.S.
- Batted: Right Threw: Right

MLB debut
- August 11, 1911, for the Washington Senators

Last MLB appearance
- September 1, 1918, for the Washington Senators

MLB statistics
- Batting average: .254
- Home runs: 4
- Runs batted in: 254

Teams
- Washington Senators (1911–1918)

Raymond Caryll Morgan (June 14, 1889 – February 15, 1940) was an infielder in Major League Baseball, playing mainly as a second baseman for the Washington Senators from 1911 through 1918. Listed at 5' 8", 155 lb., Morgan batted and threw right-handed. He was born in Baltimore, Maryland.

During the dead-ball era, second baseman Ray Morgan was part of a stellar double play combo along with shortstop George McBride for the Washington Senators in a span of eight years.

Basically a slap-hitter, Morgan compiled a .254 batting average and a .348 on-base percentage in 741 career games. His most productive season came in 1913, when he posted career-highs in average (.272), hits (131), runs (58), RBI (57) and walks (68), while turning 61 double plays in 134 games.

From 1913 to 1914 Morgan ranked fourth in the American League for the most assists by a second baseman, while collecting a .398 OBP in 1916, good for a fourth place behind Tris Speaker (.470), Ty Cobb (.452) and Eddie Collins (.405).

Following his major league stint Morgan finished his career with the Baltimore Orioles of the International League. He hit a .293 average in 168 Minor league games in parts of three seasons (1910-'11, 1920).

Morgan died in Baltimore, Maryland at the age of 50, after complications related to pneumonia and heart failure.

Batting statistics

GP	AB	R	H	2B	3B	HR	RBI	SB	BB	SO	BA	OBP	SLG
741	2480	278	630	90	33	4	254	88	320	184	.254	.348	.322

== Ernie Shore's former perfect game ==
Morgan is forever linked with Babe Ruth. During the 1917 season, Ruth started the first game of a doubleheader on June 23 for the Boston Red Sox against the Senators at Fenway Park. Morgan, leading off for the Senators, was awarded a walk after home plate umpire Brick Owens called the first four pitches all balls. After an altercation with Owens, Ruth was ejected and Ernie Shore came into the game to relieve him. Then Morgan tried stealing second base on the first pitch by Shore, but Boston catcher Sam Agnew quickly threw the ball to the second baseman to tag out Morgan. After that, Shore retired the next 26 Senators.
