= Joe Engel =

American baseball player and scout (1893–1969)

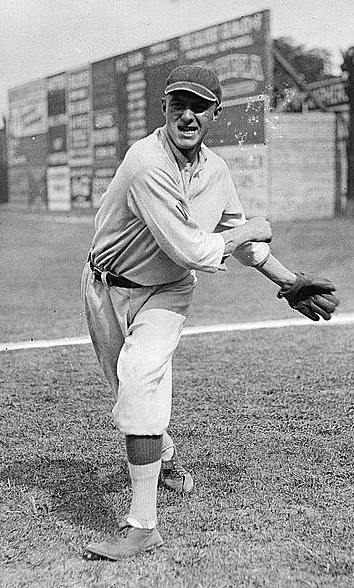
- Joe Engel, 1913 (image is reversed)
- Pitcher
- Born: March 12, 1893; Washington, D.C., U.S.
- Died: June 12, 1969 (aged 76); Chattanooga, Tennessee, U.S.
- Batted: Right Threw: Left

MLB debut
- May 30, 1912, for the Washington Senators

Last MLB appearance
- August 6, 1920, for the Washington Senators

MLB statistics
- Win–loss record: 17–23
- Earned run average: 3.38
- Strikeouts: 151
- Stats at Baseball Reference

Teams
- Washington Senators (1912–1915); Cincinnati Reds (1917); Cleveland Indians (1919); Washington Senators (1920)

This is an article about the baseball player Joe Engel. For the astronaut, see Joe Engle.

Joseph William Engel (March 12, 1893 – June 12, 1969) was an American left-handed pitcher and scout in Major League Baseball who spent nearly his entire career with the Washington Senators and went on to become a promoter and team owner in the minor leagues. He was born in Washington, D.C. as one of six children of a German immigrant who owned a bar/hotel next door to the Washington Post building in the District of Columbia. Engel was married twice and lost his only child, son Bryant, due to a traffic accident in November 1930 at age 9. Engel himself died in Chattanooga in 1969 at age 76.

== Youth ==
Engel spent his youth playing with Kermit and Alice Roosevelt, two of the children of President Teddy Roosevelt. At age 13 he joined a traveling circus. He shared a vaudeville stage with Al Jolson at age 14. A year later, he was a Washington Senators batboy, and later a team mascot.

He attended Mount St. Mary's College, where he lettered in four sports – track, baseball, basketball, and football. Engel also pitched a perfect game at Mount St. Mary's College.

== Major league career ==
Engel made it to the major leagues as a pitcher when he was 18, and played from 1912 to 1920. He played for the Senators for four seasons (1912–1915), where he was a roommate with Walter Johnson, compiling a record of 17–22. Engel became friends with Johnson: "Walter didn't drink or smoke and was more or less on the serious side. I liked my fun and as a youngster was something of a hell-raiser. But we just clicked." After the 1915 season, Engel played in only three more major league games–2 for the Cincinnati Reds in 1917 and 1919, and a final game for the Senators in 1920.

== Scouting ==
When Senators owner Clark Griffith sent Engel off to the minor-league Minneapolis Millers, he reportedly told Engel to swap himself for someone who could play ball. Engel looked the Millers over, and sent back Ed Gharrity, a catcher. Gharrity turned out to be so good that Griffith hired Engel as a scout. Engel became known as one of the greatest scouts in baseball history, discovering Goose Goslin, Joe Cronin, Alvin Crowder, Bump Hadley, Buddy Myer, Cecil Travis, Ossie Bluege, Bucky Harris, and Doc Prothro. Engel signed Cronin in Kansas City for $7,500 and brought him back to DC where he was named player/manager in 1933. Engel's discoveries helped bring the Senators three American League pennants in ten years.

== Chattanooga Lookouts ==
Engel later became best known as one of the most eccentric promoters in baseball history. In late 1929, Griffith sent Engel to Chattanooga, Tennessee, to take over operations of Griffith's newly acquired farm team, the Chattanooga Lookouts. Engel immediately constructed one of the minor leagues' finest stadiums and named it Engel Stadium for himself. He remained with the Lookouts for 34 years. One year, Engel had his players parade into the ball park on elephants for Opening Day in Washington D.C. He traded a shortstop for a turkey, roasted it and served it to local sportswriters who had been "giving him the bird." He raffled off houses and automobiles, and had canaries singing in the grandstands. One of his horses was an entrant in the Kentucky Derby. When the New York Yankees went to Chattanooga to play a pre-season exhibition game with his Lookouts, Engel located a female 17-year-old left-handed pitcher, Jackie Mitchell, who struck out both Babe Ruth and Lou Gehrig.

Engel's promotions were a hit in Chattanooga, and fans flocked to the new ballpark. In 1932 the Lookouts won the Southern Association pennant for the first time in 40 years and beat the Texas League champions in the Dixie Series. In 1936, Engel decided to buy the Lookouts, but he didn't have enough cash. He persuaded 1,700 fans to buy shares of stock at $5.00/share to give the team "local ownership". The plan failed and one year later, Griffith took back financial control of the club. In 1939, Chattanooga won its second Southern Association pennant. In 1943, faced with dismal attendance during the War years, Engel briefly moved the franchise in mid-season to Montgomery, Alabama for the remainder of that season. The Lookouts were back in Chattanooga the following spring. All through the 1940s and 1950s Chattanooga remained the top farm club for the Washington Senators. In the mid-late 1950s Harmon Killebrew and Jim Kaat, along with other future major leaguers, spent time playing for the Lookouts. In 1960, he was presented with the King of Baseball award given by Minor League Baseball at the annual Winter meetings. Engel's 1969 obituary in the Chattanooga newspaper noted that he'd "imported bullfrogs from Louisiana so that he could hear them sing at sunset and tied coconuts on palm trees to help sell real estate in Miami Beach."

When a shortstop told Engel, "Pay me $5,000 or count me out", Engel replied with a telegram: "One, Two, Three, Four, Five, Six, Seven, Eight, Nine, Ten."

Engel also branched out into broadcasting; he was the owner of WDEF-AM-TV for many years.
