= Clyde Milan =

American baseball player and manager (1887-1953)

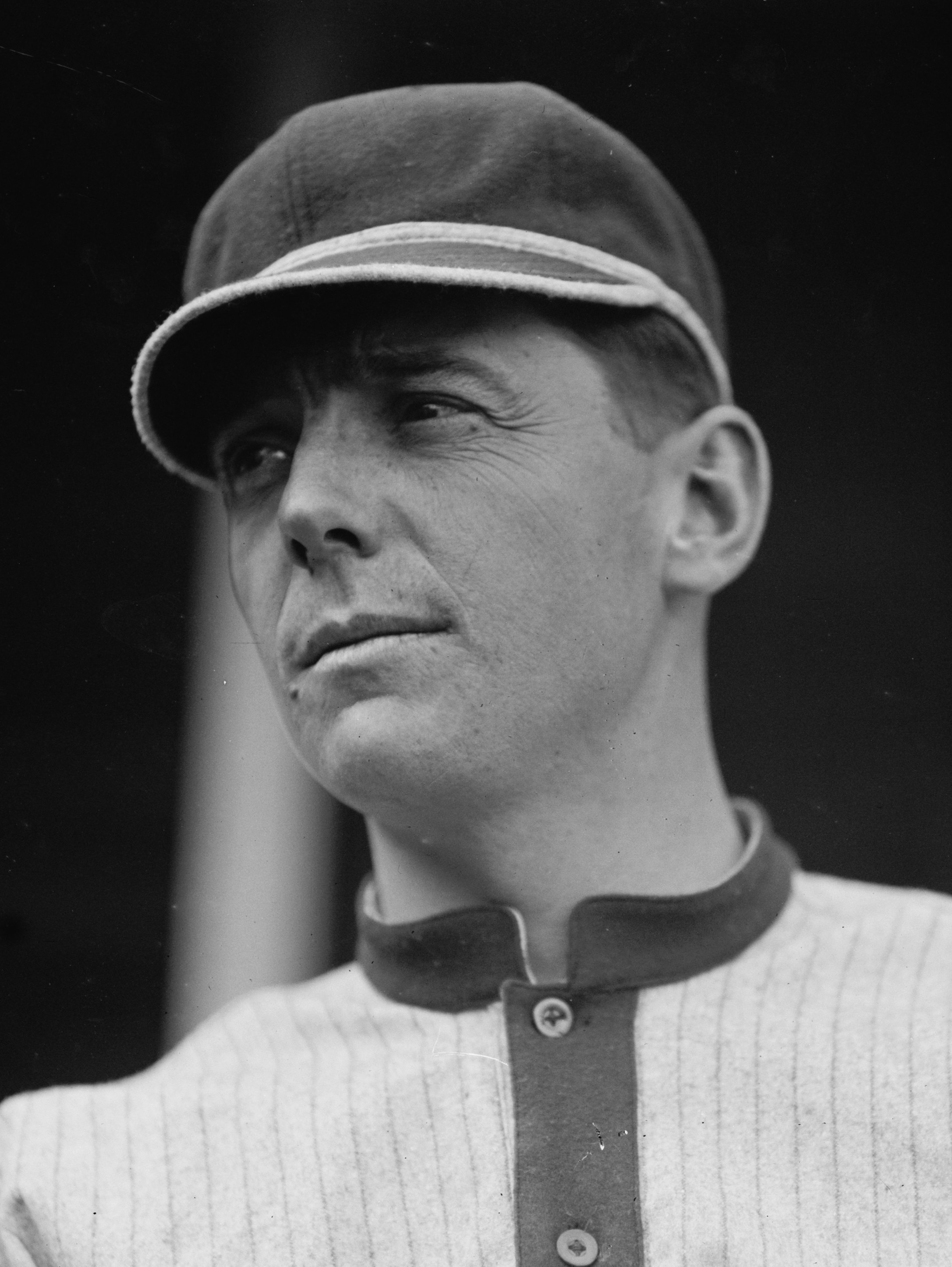
- Milan with the Washington Senators in 1913.
- Outfielder / Manager
- Born: March 25, 1887; Linden, Tennessee, U.S.
- Died: March 3, 1953 (aged 65); Orlando, Florida, U.S.
- Batted: Left Threw: Right

MLB debut
- August 19, 1907, for the Washington Senators

Last MLB appearance
- September 22, 1922, for the Washington Senators

MLB statistics
- Batting average: .285
- Hits: 2,100
- Home runs: 17
- Runs batted in: 617
- Stolen bases: 495
- Managerial record: 69–85
- Winning %: .448
- Stats at Baseball Reference

Teams
- As player: Washington Senators (1907–1922); As manager: Washington Senators (1922); As coach: Washington Senators (1928–1928, 1938–1952)

Career highlights and awards
- 2× AL stolen base leader (1912, 1913)

Jesse Clyde Milan (MILL-in; March 25, 1887 – March 3, 1953) was an American professional baseball player who spent his entire career as an outfielder with the Washington Senators (1907–1922). He was not a powerful batter, but was adept at getting on base and was fleet of foot, receiving the nickname "Deerfoot" for his speed. He set a modern-rules record for stolen bases in a season with 88 in 1912, a mark surpassed three years later by Ty Cobb. Milan was mostly a center fielder.

He was born in Linden, Tennessee and was listed as 5 feet 9 inches (1.75 m) tall and 168 pounds (76 kg). Like Cobb, Milan batted left-handed and threw right-handed. In 16 seasons with Washington, he batted .285 with 17 home runs and 617 runs batted in over 1982 games. He accumulated 495 stolen bases (tied for 37th all-time with Willie Keeler) and 1004 runs scored. Milan had 2,100 hits in 7,359 career at bats, which was 37th best among all players when he retired. He ended with a .353 all-time on-base percentage. Defensively, he recorded a .953 fielding percentage at all three outfield positions.

As a player-manager (1922 only), with the Senators, he was 69–85, a .448 lifetime winning percentage, after which he managed minor league teams and spent 17 seasons (1928–29 and 1938 until his death) as a coach with Washington. His brother, Horace Milan, was briefly his teammate with the Senators.

Milan suffered a fatal heart attack in Orlando, Florida on March 3, 1953, during the Senators' spring training camp, where Milan was beginning what would have been his 18th season as a Washington coach.

== See also ==
- List of Major League Baseball career hits leaders
- List of Major League Baseball career triples leaders
- List of Major League Baseball career runs scored leaders
- List of Major League Baseball annual stolen base leaders
- List of Major League Baseball career stolen bases leaders
- List of Major League Baseball player-managers
- List of Major League Baseball players who spent their entire career with one franchise
