= Bert Gallia =

American baseball player (1891-1976)

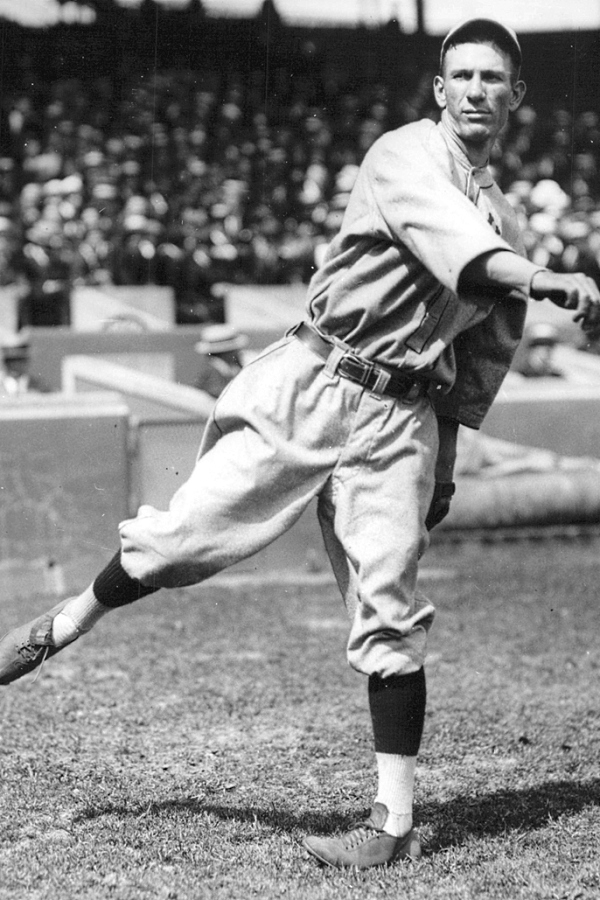
- Pitcher
- Born: October 14, 1891; Beeville, Texas, U.S.
- Died: March 19, 1976 (aged 84); Devine, Texas, U.S.
- Batted: Right Threw: Right

MLB debut
- September 4, 1912, for the Washington Senators

Last MLB appearance
- July 31, 1920, for the Philadelphia Phillies

MLB statistics
- Win–loss record: 66–69
- Earned run average: 3.14
- Strikeouts: 550
- Stats at Baseball Reference

Teams
- Washington Senators (1912–1917); St. Louis Browns (1918–1920); Philadelphia Phillies (1920)

Melvin Allys "Bert" Gallia (October 14, 1891 – March 19, 1976) was an American pitcher in Major League Baseball from 1912 to 1920. He played for the Washington Senators, St. Louis Browns, and Philadelphia Phillies.

Gallia grew up in Woodsboro, Texas. As an 18-year-old student at St. Louis College (later St. Mary's University) in San Antonio in 1909, Gallia became famed for striking out Ty Cobb in an exhibition game held at the St. Louis College campus.
