= Eddie Ainsmith =

American baseball player (1890–1981)

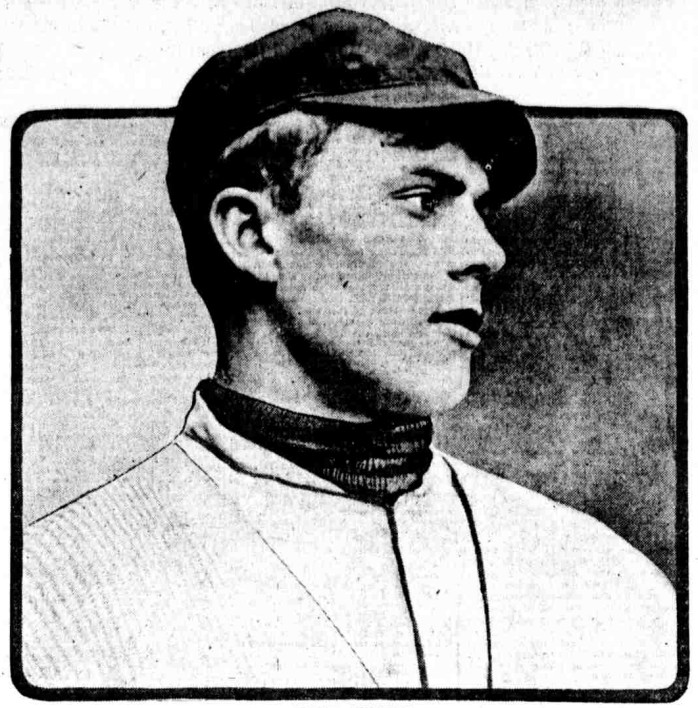
- Catcher
- Born: February 4, 1890; Russian Empire
- Died: September 6, 1981 (aged 91); Ft. Lauderdale, Florida, U.S.
- Batted: Right Threw: Right

MLB debut
- August 9, 1910, for the Washington Senators

Last MLB appearance
- July 21, 1924, for the New York Giants

MLB statistics
- Batting average: .232
- Home runs: 22
- Runs batted in: 317
- Stats at Baseball Reference

Teams
- Washington Senators (1910–1918); Detroit Tigers (1919–1921); St. Louis Cardinals (1921–1923); Brooklyn Robins (1923); New York Giants (1924)

Edward Wilbur Ainsmith (Note: His birth name is sometimes reported as Edward Anshmedt) (February 4, 1890 – September 6, 1981), nicknamed "Dorf," was an American professional baseball catcher. He played fifteen seasons in the major leagues with the Washington Senators (1910–1918), Detroit Tigers (1919–1921), St. Louis Cardinals (1921–1923), Brooklyn Robins (1923), and New York Giants (1924). He batted and threw right-handed. In 1,078 career games, Ainsmith batted .232 with 707 hits and 317 runs batted in.

After retiring as a player, Ainsmith worked as a minor league umpire, a baseball scout, and a manager in the All-American Girls Professional Baseball League.

== Early life ==
Ainsmith was born in the Russian Empire. His family came to the United States through Ellis Island when he was young. He attended Colby Academy in New Hampshire. He began his playing career in the New England League in 1908 before joining the Senators in the American League.

== Career ==
The Day Book in Chicago, Illinois described Ainsmith in their May 10, 1913 edition as "a gingery young receiver, throws well, can handle Walter Johnson and is a good batter. But he is not the man to handle a young pitcher like [Joe] Engle". The Washington Times wrote in 1922 that Ainsmith "is a formidable blocker at the plate. He is endowed with tremendous strength like an ancient Greek athlete or a Roman gladiator. It is almost impossible to upset him when he sets himself on the base path."

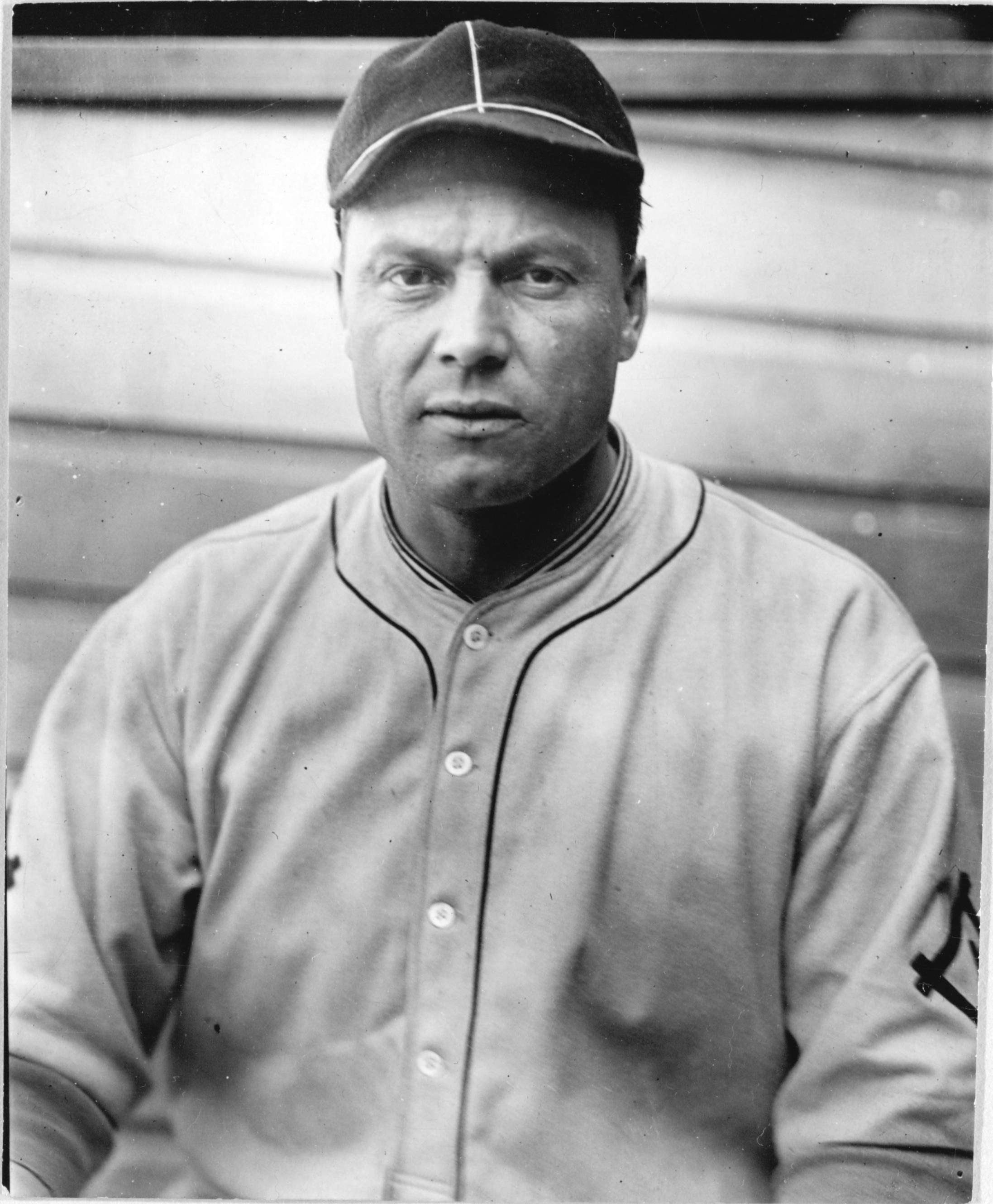
Eddie Ainsmith

Ainsmith was known for his toughness on the field. Walter Johnson said that if Ainsmith was bleeding from being spiked by an opposing player, Ainsmith would refuse assistance from the team trainer, denying that he was injured. In 1913, as a member of the Washington Senators, Ainsmith was suspended by Ban Johnson for throwing dirt at umpire Peter McLaughlin.

On April 21, 1915, Ainsmith was sentenced to 30 days at Occoquan Workhouse for an assault on a streetcar operator in Washington, D.C.

In 1918, Ainsmith was drafted into the United States armed forces. He appealed to the United States Department of War for an exemption from the draft, but Secretary of War Newton D. Baker ruled that baseball was not an exempt occupation.

== Later life ==
In 1925, Ainsmith promoted a tour of an American teenage female baseball team which he led through East Asia. After suffering financial losses, Ainsmith reportedly abandoned the girls and returned to the United States on his own.

Ainsmith also worked as a scout in the New York Giants organization. In the early 1940s, he provided a scouting report on pitcher Sal Maglie that, though lukewarm, led to Maglie being drafted by the Giants. Ainsmith managed the 1947 Rockford Peaches in the All-American Girls Professional Baseball League.
