= Rip Williams =

American baseball player (1882–1933)

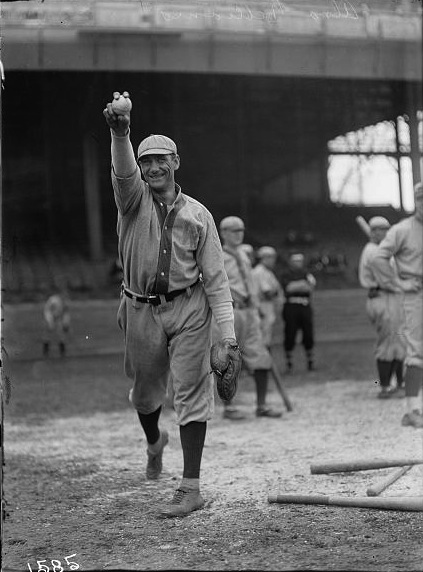
- Rip Williams in 1912
- Catcher / First baseman
- Born: January 31, 1882; Carthage, Illinois, U.S.
- Died: July 23, 1933 (aged 51); Keokuk, Iowa, U.S.
- Batted: Right Threw: Right

MLB debut
- April 12, 1911, for the Boston Red Sox

Last MLB appearance
- June 8, 1918, for the Cleveland Indians

MLB statistics
- Batting average: .265
- Home runs: 2
- Runs batted in: 145
- Stats at Baseball Reference

Teams
- Boston Red Sox (1911); Washington Senators (1912–1916); Cleveland Indians (1918)

Alva Mitchell "Rip" Williams (January 31, 1882 – July 23, 1933) was a reserve infielder in Major League Baseball, playing mainly as a catcher or first baseman for three different teams between the 1911 and 1918 seasons. Listed at 5 ft 11.5 in (1.82 m), 187 lb., Williams batted and threw right-handed. He was born in Carthage, Illinois.

Basically a line drive hitter and a competent glove man, Williams entered the majors in 1911 with the Boston Red Sox, playing for them one year before joining the Washington Senators (1912–1916) and Cleveland Indians (1918). His most productive season came in 1911 with Boston, when he posted career-numbers in games (95), runs (31), RBI (31) and stolen bases (9). He also hit a career-high .318 in 61 games for the 1912 Senators.

In a seven-season career, Williams was a .265 hitter (314-for-1186) with two home runs and 145 RBI in 498 games, including 111 runs, 51 doubles, 23 triples, 27 stolen bases, and a .328 on-base percentage. He made 364 fielding appearances as a catcher (212), first baseman (144), right fielder (5), third baseman (2) and center field (1).

Williams died at the age of 51 in Keokuk, Iowa.
