= George McBride =

American baseball player and manager (1880–1973)

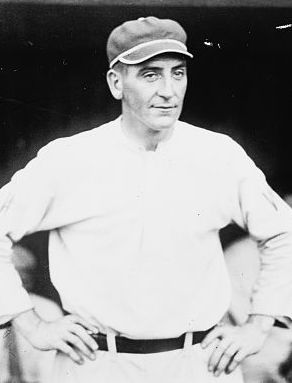
- Shortstop / Manager
- Born: November 20, 1880; Milwaukee, Wisconsin, U.S.
- Died: July 2, 1973 (aged 92); Milwaukee, Wisconsin, U.S.
- Batted: Right Threw: Right

MLB debut
- September 12, 1901, for the Milwaukee Brewers

Last MLB appearance
- July 29, 1920, for the Washington Senators

MLB statistics
- Batting average: .218
- Home runs: 7
- Runs batted in: 447
- Managerial record: 80–73–1
- Winning %: .523
- Stats at Baseball Reference
- Managerial record at Baseball Reference

Teams
- As player: Milwaukee Brewers (1901); Pittsburgh Pirates (1905); St. Louis Cardinals (1905–1906); Washington Senators (1908–1920); As manager: Washington Senators (1921)

George Florian "Pinch" McBride (November 20, 1880 – July 2, 1973) was an American professional baseball shortstop for the Milwaukee Brewers, Pittsburgh Pirates, St. Louis Cardinals, and Washington Senators from 1901 to 1920.

He started off with the short-lived Milwaukee Brewers (they moved to St. Louis, Missouri after the 1901 season and became the Browns), but he only had 12 at-bats in three games. After stints in semi-pro ball, he joined the Pirates in 1905 but was traded mid-season to the Cardinals. He did not become a regular starter until the 1908 season, when he joined the Senators and became their everyday shortstop. He never hit for a high average (his best season was in 1911 when he hit .235 with 11 doubles and 4 triples, and his .218 career batting average is the lowest in MLB history among players with at least 5,000 at bats), but was very talented with the glove, leading the American League in fielding for four straight seasons (1912 – 1915). He was given the nickname "Pinch" for his ability to hit in the clutch.

In 1921, he was named manager of the Senators, succeeding Clark Griffith, and led the team to a record of 80–73–1 (.523). At the end of the 1921 season, he was hit in the face with a ball during batting practice, paralyzing one side of his face. He was forced to retire from the Senators, but later joined the Detroit Tigers.

McBride died in Milwaukee, Wisconsin on July 2, 1973, at age 92.

== Sources ==
- Career statistics from Baseball Reference · Baseball Reference (Minors) · Retrosheet · Baseball Almanac
