= Danny Moeller =

American baseball player (1885–1951)

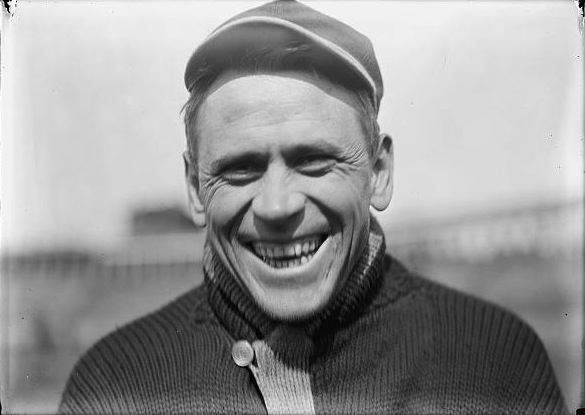
- Moeller, circa 1913
- Outfielder
- Born: March 23, 1885; DeWitt, Iowa, U.S.
- Died: April 15, 1951 (aged 66); Florence, Alabama, U.S.
- Batted: Switch Threw: Right

MLB debut
- September 24, 1907, for the Pittsburgh Pirates

Last MLB appearance
- September 30, 1916, for the Cleveland Indians

MLB statistics
- Batting average: .243
- Home runs: 15
- Runs batted in: 192
- Stats at Baseball Reference

Teams
- Pittsburgh Pirates (1907–1908); Washington Senators (1912–1916); Cleveland Indians (1916)

Daniel Edward Moeller (March 23, 1885 – April 14, 1951) was an American professional baseball player.

Moeller was an outfielder in the Major Leagues from 1907–1908 and from 1912–1916. During his career, he played for the Pittsburgh Pirates, Washington Senators, and Cleveland Indians.

In 704 games over seven seasons, Moeller posted a .243 batting average (618-for-2538) with 379 runs, 15 home runs, 192 RBI, 171 stolen bases and 302 bases on balls. He led the American League in strikeouts in 1912 and 1913. Defensively, he recorded a .939 fielding percentage playing at right and left field.
