= Eddie Foster (baseball) =

American baseball player (1887–1937)

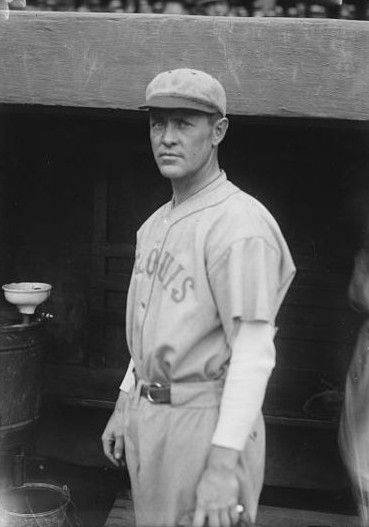
- Third baseman
- Born: February 13, 1887; Chicago, Illinois, U.S.
- Died: January 15, 1937 (aged 49); Washington, D.C., U.S.
- Batted: Right Threw: Right

MLB debut
- April 14, 1910, for the New York Highlanders

Last MLB appearance
- August 5, 1923, for the St. Louis Browns

MLB statistics
- Batting average: .264
- Home runs: 6
- Runs batted in: 451
- Stats at Baseball Reference

Teams
- New York Highlanders (1910); Washington Senators (1912–1919); Boston Red Sox (1920–1922); St. Louis Browns (1922–1923)

Edward Cunningham Foster (February 13, 1887 – January 15, 1937) was an American professional baseball third baseman. He played in Major League Baseball (MLB) from 1910 to 1923 for the New York Highlanders, Washington Senators, Boston Red Sox, and St. Louis Browns.

== Career ==
Foster played in the minor leagues from 1906 to 1909, then appeared in 30 games for the New York Highlanders in 1910, hitting only .133. He returned to the minor leagues in 1911. Foster's longest stint with a professional team came with the Washington Senators between 1912 and 1919. He had one of his best seasons in 1912, finishing with career highs in hits (176), doubles (34), and runs batted in (70).

In the first month of the 1913 season, Foster contracted typhoid fever. He was treated at Georgetown University Hospital, where he was cared for by a nurse named Mary Chrismond. Foster and Chrismond got married in 1915.

Foster was known for his ability to hit the ball to a given part of the field, and Senators pitcher Walter Johnson appreciated Foster's ability to field bunts at third base.

After the 1919 season, the Senators traded Foster, Harry Harper, and Mike Menosky to the Boston Red Sox for Braggo Roth and Red Shannon. The Red Sox waived Foster in August 1922, and the St. Louis Browns claimed him. He hit .306 for the 1922 Browns, but he hit only .180 in 37 games in 1923 before retiring. In 1500 games over 13 seasons, Foster posted a .264 batting average (1490-for-5652) with 732 runs, 191 doubles, 71 triples, 6 home runs, 451 RBI, 195 stolen bases, 528 bases on balls, .329 on-base percentage and .326 slugging percentage. He finished his career with a .935 fielding percentage playing mostly at third base but also at second base and shortstop.

== Later life and death ==
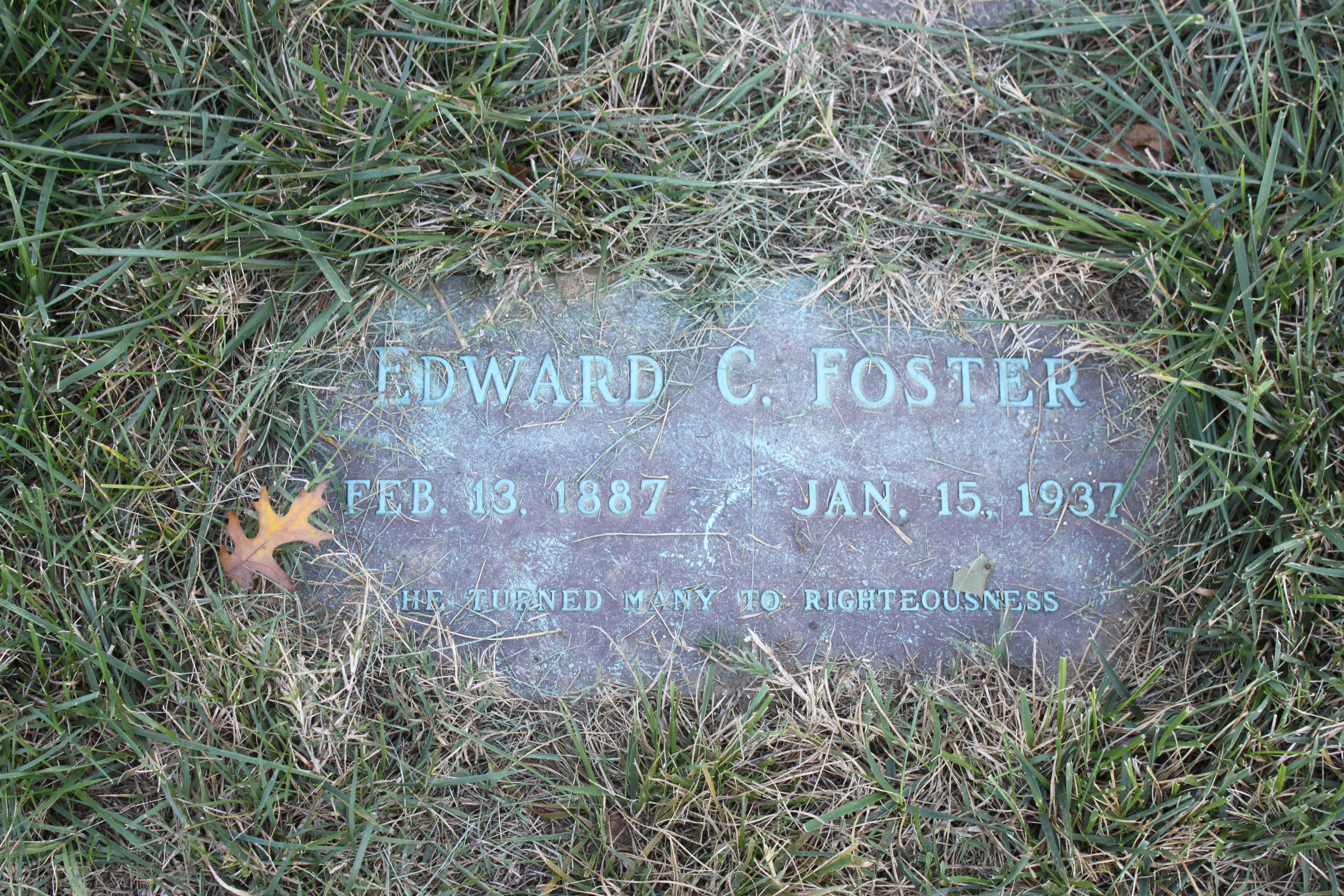
Grave of Foster in Columbia Gardens Cemetery

In early 1924, Foster said that he would study to become a minister rather than returning to baseball. Foster was involved in an automobile accident on Baltimore Boulevard, where he crashed into a signboard on January 7, 1937 in Maryland. His injured body was found on the side of the street. He was taken to Casualty Hospital in Washington D.C. in critical condition. Foster died of his injuries at Casualty Hospital on January 16.
