= Brandon Graham =

American football player (born 1988)

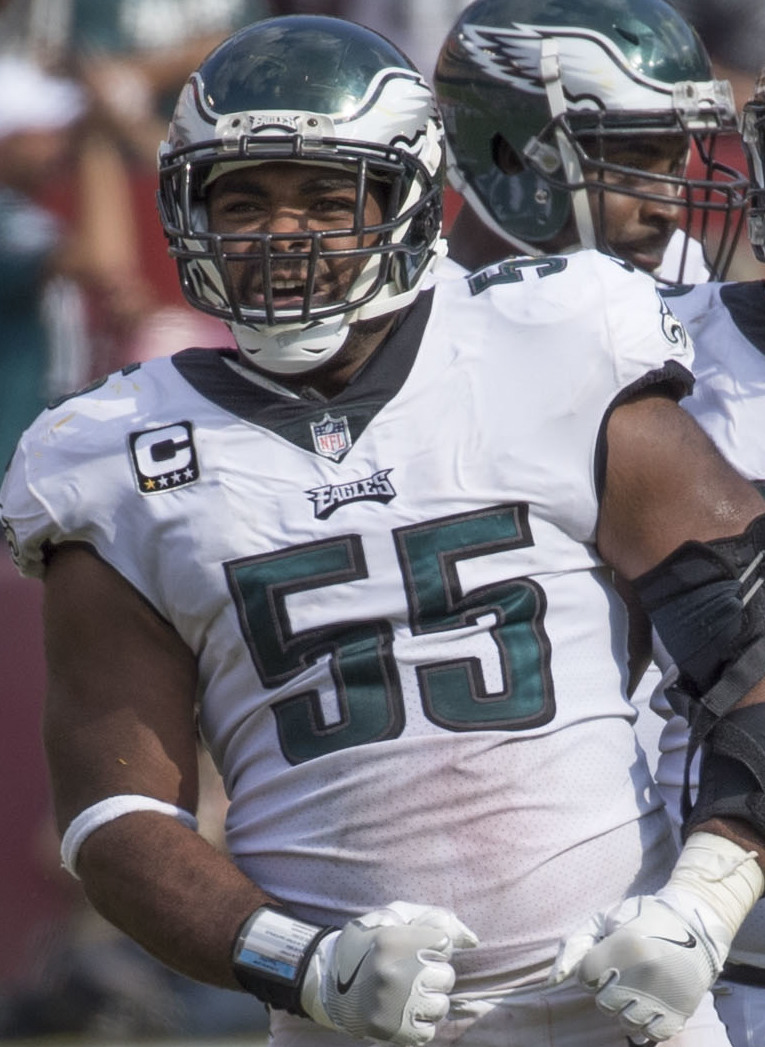
- Graham with the Philadelphia Eagles in 2017

No. 54, 55
- Position: Defensive end

Personal information
- Born: April 3, 1988 (age 38); Detroit, Michigan, U.S.
- Listed height: 6 ft 2 in (1.88 m)
- Listed weight: 265 lb (120 kg)

Career information
- High school: Crockett (Detroit)
- College: Michigan (2006–2009)
- NFL draft: 2010: 1st round, 13th overall pick

Career history
- Philadelphia Eagles (2010–2025)

Awards and highlights
- 2× Super Bowl champion (LII, LIX); Second-team All-Pro (2016); Pro Bowl (2020); Big Ten Most Valuable Player (2009); First-team All-American (2009); First-team All-Big Ten (2009); Second-team All-Big Ten (2008)

Career NFL statistics
- Total tackles: 495
- Sacks: 79.5
- Forced fumbles: 23
- Fumble recoveries: 7
- Pass deflections: 11
- Defensive touchdowns: 1
- Stats at Pro Football Reference

Brandon Lee Graham (born April 3, 1988) is an American former professional football player who played all 16 seasons of his career with the Philadelphia Eagles of the National Football League (NFL). A defensive end, he played college football for the Michigan Wolverines, earning first-team All-American honors in 2009. Graham was selected by the Eagles in the first round of the 2010 NFL draft with the 13th overall selection and the first from the Big Ten Conference.

In high school, he was a highly rated linebacker who served as captain for the 2006 U.S. Army All-American Bowl. He was listed on numerous All-American lists and was a finalist for some of the highest individual rewards a high school football player can earn.

Graham was the 2009 Big Ten Conference co-MVP as recognized by the Chicago Tribune Silver Football award. He was the 2009 FBS tackles for a loss (per game) champion after finishing second in 2008 by 0.01 tackles for loss per game. He was the 2008 and 2009 Big Ten Conference tackles for loss leader. After completing his career as defensive end for the 2009 Michigan Wolverines football team, he had a total of 29.5 career sacks and 56 career tackles for loss for the Michigan Wolverines football team. In 2008, he led the Big Ten Conference in tackles for loss, with 20 in 11 games. In 2009, he posted 26 tackles for loss and 10.5 sacks in 12 games. As a member of the 2008 Michigan Wolverines football team he earned Second-team 2008 Big Ten All-conference recognition from both the coaches and the media. He was a finalist for the 2009 NCAA Division I FBS football Hendricks Award. He was a First-team 2009 All-Big Ten selection by the coaches and media. He was named to several First-team and Second-team 2009 All-America lists by various publications. Graham was also named MVP of the 2010 Senior Bowl.

Graham was a second team 2016 All-Pro selection and a 2020 Pro Bowl selection. He led the Super Bowl LII champion Philadelphia Eagles in quarterback sacks with 9.5 during the 2017 NFL season. Graham is responsible for one of the biggest plays in Philadelphia sports history, as he posted a pivotal strip sack on Tom Brady in the closing minutes of Super Bowl LII, which was the franchise's first Super Bowl victory. He was also a member of the 2024 team which won Super Bowl LIX. Graham has played more games and more seasons for the Eagles than any other player.

== Early life ==
As a youth, Graham played football for the Police Athletic League Detroit Giants for seven years until joining the eighth grade team. Born and raised in Detroit, Graham attended Crockett Vocational Tech, a school that began participating in Michigan High School Athletic Association (MHSAA) football competitions in 1996 and that did not have a proper locker room for its football team before moving in his senior season. Since the football field had no lights, parents had to shine their car lights on the field for late practices. At Crockett, Graham, who had been playing competitive football since age seven, was expected to make an immediate impact upon joining the football team's starting lineup as a sophomore, and at the end of the season he was recognized as an honorable mention lineman 2003 All-Detroit selection by The Detroit News.

As a junior, Graham served as linebacker, offensive guard, placekicker, and punter for his team, and he led his team to the MHSAA state championships, while becoming one of three juniors named to the 2004 First-team All-Detroit team with one source listing him as a placekicker and the other as a linebacker on the team. Crockett won Detroit Public School League Division 1 championship game at Ford Field and entered the Division 5 MHSAA semifinals with a 12–0 record, but Crockett lost 9–0 to defending state champion Lumen Christi Catholic School. In addition to recording 91 tackles (20 for a loss), he maintained a 3.8 grade point average. In one game, he posted twelve tackles, four sacks, four forced fumbles, two blocked punts and scored on a 78-yard fake punt. He was selected for the Associated Press first-team Class B all-state team as a linebacker.

In high school, Rivals.com ranked Graham as the top class of 2006 high school football prospect in the state of Michigan, the number two inside linebacker prospect and the overall fifteenth best prospect in the nation. Scout.com listed him as the number three linebacker in the nation and described him as the number one overall prospect in the midwest. Scout also described him as "arguably the best inside linebacker in the nation". ESPNU ranked him as the number two inside linebacker and number thirty-one prospect in the nation. Recruiting analyst Tom Lemming, listed Graham as the best linebacker in the country for USA Today. The Atlanta Journal-Constitution listed him at 15th among their national top 25 prospects.

Entering his senior season, he was the overwhelming selection as the best high school football player in the state of Michigan according to The Detroit News. He had run a 4.43-second 40-yard dash at the Nike Summer football camp. As a senior, he intended to also play tight end and fullback. One Detroit News preseason analysts listed him at linebacker, tight end and offensive guard. During the season, after missing four weeks to a knee injury, Graham was chosen as one of 78 players to participate in the January 7, 2006 U.S. Army All-American Bowl at the Alamodome. He was also named as a finalist for both the Parade All-America High School player of the year (The high school equivalent of the Heisman Trophy) and the Walter Payton Trophy. He was elected captain of the East team at the U.S. Army All-American Bowl and recorded four tackles as well as a blocked field goal in the game that also featured two of his Michigan teammates: (Justin Boren and Stevie Brown). There were only 16 finalists for the Parade award, including future Michigan teammate Stephen Schilling and future Heisman-winner Tim Tebow. Graham led his team to a rematch against Lumen Christi, which they lost 35–21 in the MHSAA Division 5 district championship game. In Graham's three years at Crockett, they went undefeated in the regular season and as a senior he was again selected to the All-Detroit first-team as a linebacker. Graham was also selected as to the Associated Press Class B All-State football team as its player of the year. The Detroit News selected him to the All-Class state Dream Team. He was also selected as the All-class statewide best linebacker as part of the inaugural class of The Michigan Prep Football Great 8 awarded by the Mid-Michigan Touchdown Club for being best at his position in the state. By his senior year, he had a 3.2 grade point average.

Since Graham was the first Michigan athlete to play in the U.S. Army All-American Bowl, he was not aware that he was violating Michigan state rules by participating in an out-of-state all-star game. He had to surrender his high school athletic eligibility for the winter and spring seasons. During his time away from athletics, he overate and added 40 pounds (18 kg). Although he had been recruited as a linebacker, with the additional weight he was moved to defensive end. As he lost the excess weight he began to realize that he could excel at a lighter weight.

For his athletic excellence, Graham received many honors. Among the recognition he received are Parade Magazine All-American, EA Sports All-American, USA Today All-USA High School All-America first team (No. 14 player in the nation by USA Today), Michigan Gatorade Player of the Year, first player from the state of Michigan to play in the U.S. Army All-American Bowl, 2005 Detroit News No. 1 Blue Chip prospect, and No. 2 on the Detroit Free Press Best of the Midwest rankings. In addition, he was recognized as one of ten top prep athletes in Michigan in 2005–2006, including men and women from all sports, as a 2006 McDonald's-Powerade Tomorrow's Winners honoree at the Michigan Sports Hall of Fame dinner.

College recruiting
| Name | Hometown | School | Height | Weight | 40^{‡} | Commit date |
|---|---|---|---|---|---|---|
| Brandon Graham; LB | Detroit, Michigan | Crockett Vocational Tech (MI) | 6 ft 2 in (1.88 m) | 250.5 lb (113.6 kg) | 4.65 | Feb 20, 2005 |
| Brandon Graham; LB | Recruit ratings: Scout: Rivals: (86) | | | | | |
Overall recruit ranking: Scout: 3 (LB) Rivals: 15, 2 (ILB), 1 (MI) ESPN: 31, 2 (ILB)
Note: In many cases, Scout, Rivals, 247Sports, On3, and ESPN may conflict in their listings of height and weight.; In these cases, the average was taken. ESPN grades are on a 100-point scale.; Sources: "Michigan Football Commitments". Rivals.; "2006 Michigan Football Commits". Scout.; "ESPN". ESPN.; "Scout.com Team Recruiting Rankings". Scout.; "2006 Team Ranking". Rivals.com.

== College career ==
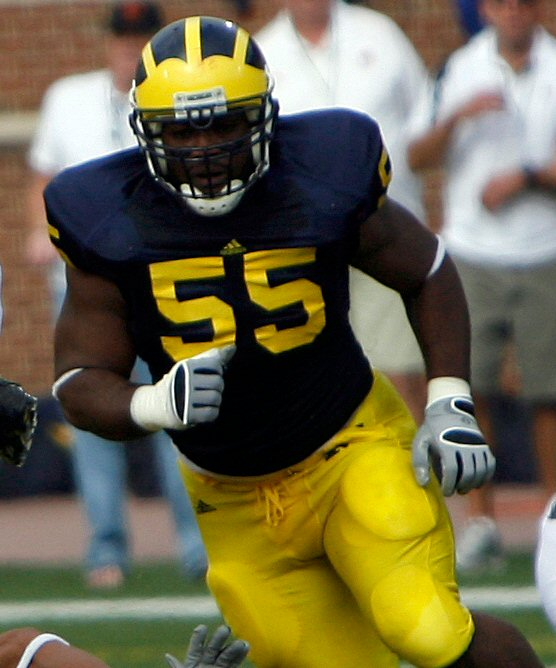
Graham played for the University of Michigan Wolverines in college.

=== Lloyd Carr era ===
Graham arrived at Michigan measuring 295 pounds (134 kg) and 6 feet 2 inches (1.88 m). Graham was initially listed as a linebacker at Michigan, but before the 2006 NCAA Division I FBS football season started for the 2006 Michigan Wolverines football team he switched to defensive end. Graham was (along with Greg Matthews, Carlos Brown, Brandon Minor, and Stevie Brown) one of five true freshmen to play in the season opening game. Graham was the backup for 2006 Lombardi Award and 2006 Ted Hendricks Award winner LaMarr Woodley. Graham also performed as a reserve defensive tackle during the season. Graham made his first tackle for Michigan on October 28 against Northwestern and recorded his first sack and forced fumble on November 11 against Indiana.

As the 2007 Michigan Wolverines football team prepared for the 2007 NCAA Division I FBS football season, Graham got some unusual news off the field when he found out that he had been given a perfect 99 rating in the NCAA 2008 EA Sports even though his star teammates Chad Henne, Jake Long and Mike Hart had not. Also, off the field, Graham was issued a ticket playing loud music in a vehicle on July 24 and missed the September 18 court date after pleading not guilty. This caused a judge to issue an arrest warrant for failing to appear in court on a disorderly conduct charge. The charges were dropped under the belief that he had been misidentified. At the start of training camp, he weighed 262 pounds (119 kg) and was the projected starter at defensive end. Although projected to as the starter, Graham played sparingly in the opening game loss to two-time defending FCS champions Appalachian State Mountaineers on September 1. Head coach Lloyd Carr noted his disfavor with Graham at the start of the season: "Brandon, he needs to get focused," Carr said, "and do the things that he's capable of doing." He was disappointed in Graham's efforts in practice. In the third game, on September 15 against Notre Dame Graham recorded 3.5 sacks in the rivalry game to help lead Michigan to its first win of the season. The following week, he had 1.5 sacks, a forced fumble and a fumble recovery in a victory against Penn State. Over the course of the season, he started six games at defensive end. He led the team in sacks with 8.5 and was second in forced fumbles with 3. He ranked seventh in the Big Ten for both statistics. He was a mid-season Ted Hendricks Award watch list candidate.

=== Rich Rodriguez era ===
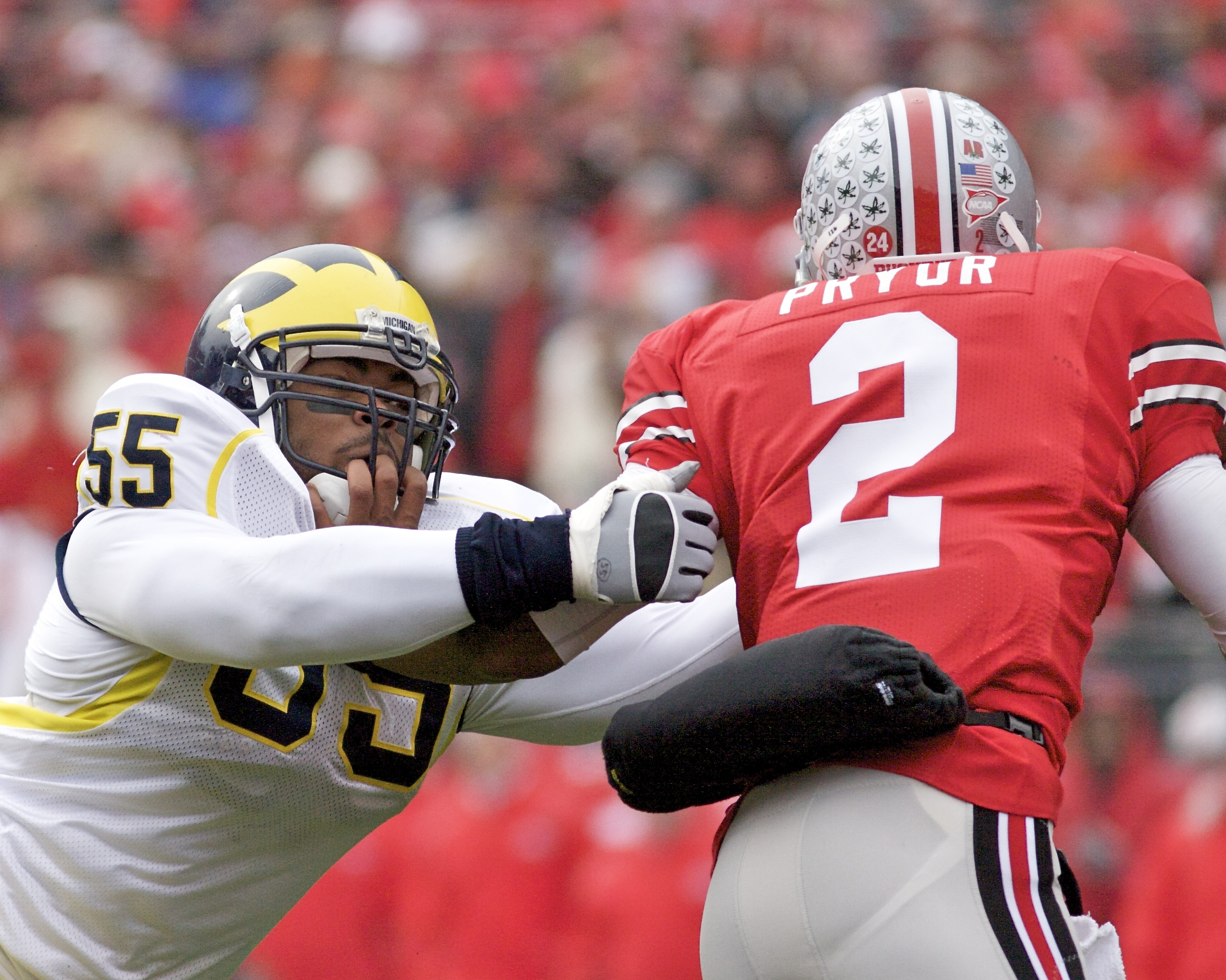
Graham tackles Terrelle Pryor during 2008 Michigan – Ohio State rivalry game

Graham, who had been troubled by conditioning issues the prior season, arrived at spring practice in very good shape, which pleased newly arrived head coach Rich Rodriguez, who was welcomed by a defensive line composed entirely of returning starters, including Graham. Graham began the 2008 NCAA Division I FBS football season as a Hendricks award watch list candidate for the 2008 Michigan Wolverines football team. However, the team began the season unranked in the Associated Press poll for the first time in 23 years. On September 27 Graham had 3 sacks and 2 forced fumbles against the Wisconsin Badgers, and he was named Big Ten Conference Defensive Player of the Week. Prior to the October 25 Paul Bunyan Trophy game against Michigan State, Graham guaranteed a victory. Although the team lost 35–21, Graham again recorded three sacks. Graham finished the season with 10 sacks. He led the Big Ten with 20 tackles for a loss and 1.82 tackles for loss per game and was second with 0.91 sacks/game. He ranked second nationally in tackles for loss and tied for eleventh in sacks. After the season, he was recognized as a 2008 Second-team All-Big Ten Conference selection by both the coaches and the media. Graham was selected as the team Most Valuable Player.

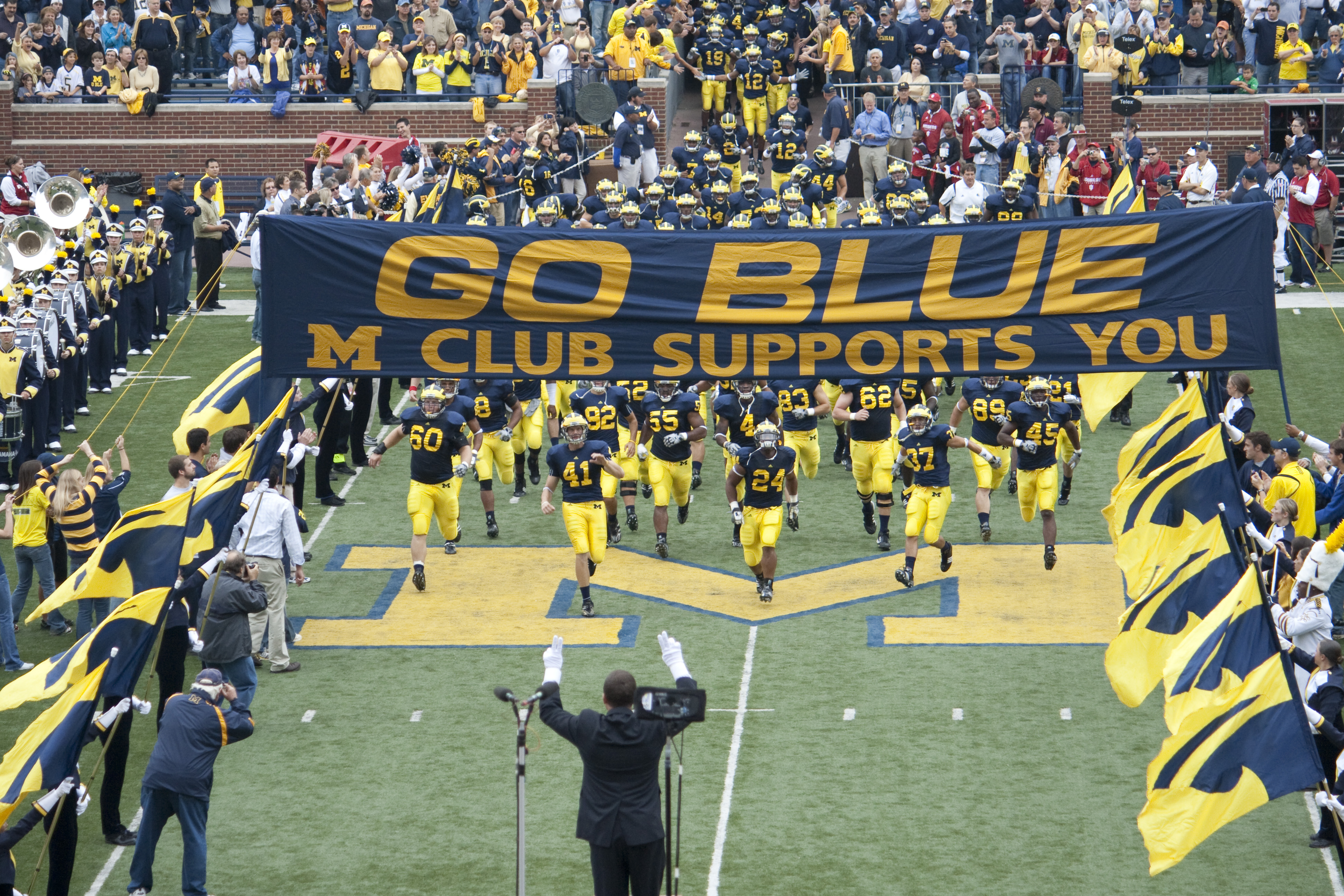
Graham in the first wave as the 2009 Michigan Wolverines football team storms into Michigan Stadium

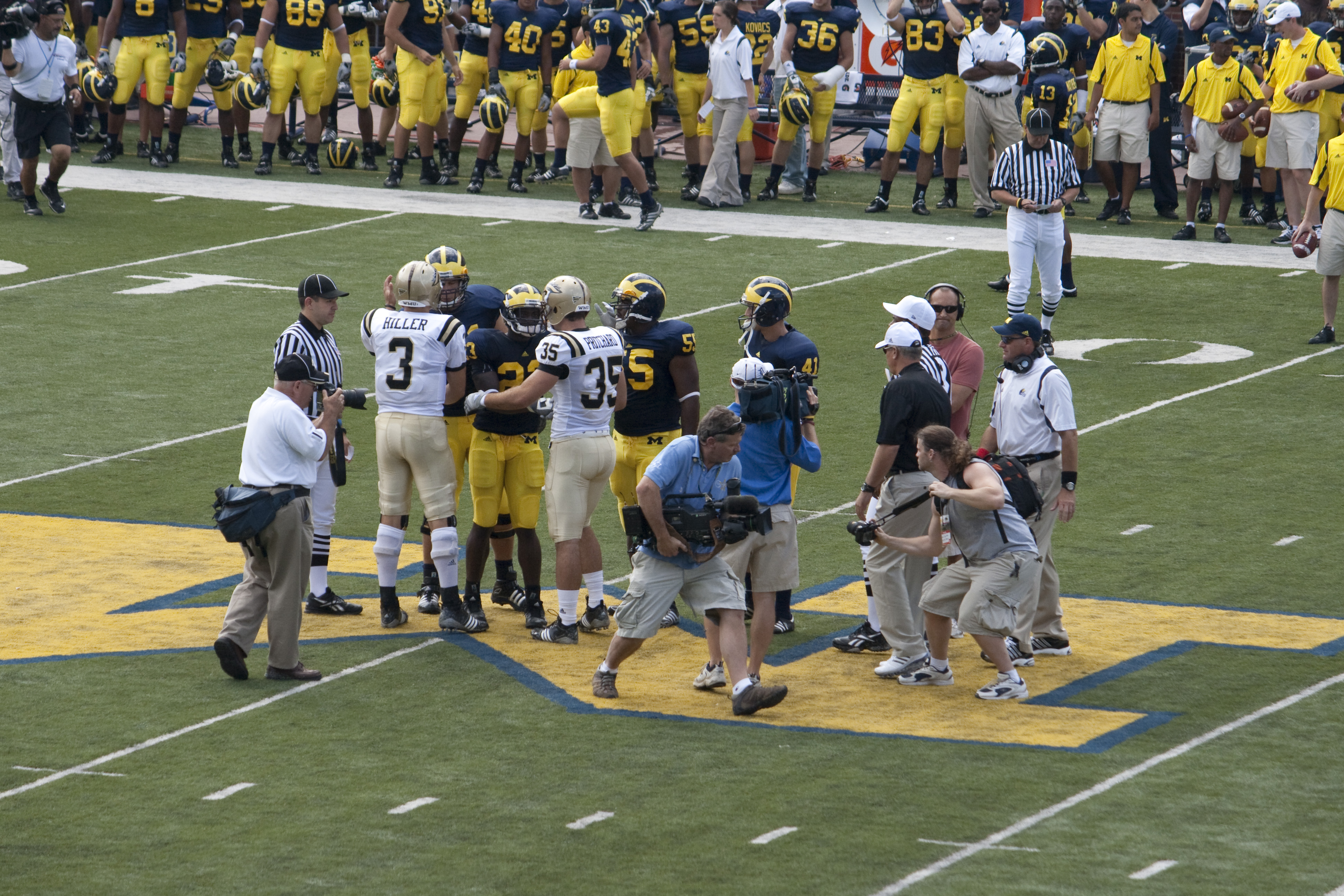
Graham during coin toss with Tim Hiller and teammates Carlos Brown, Zoltan Mesko and Mark Ortmann.

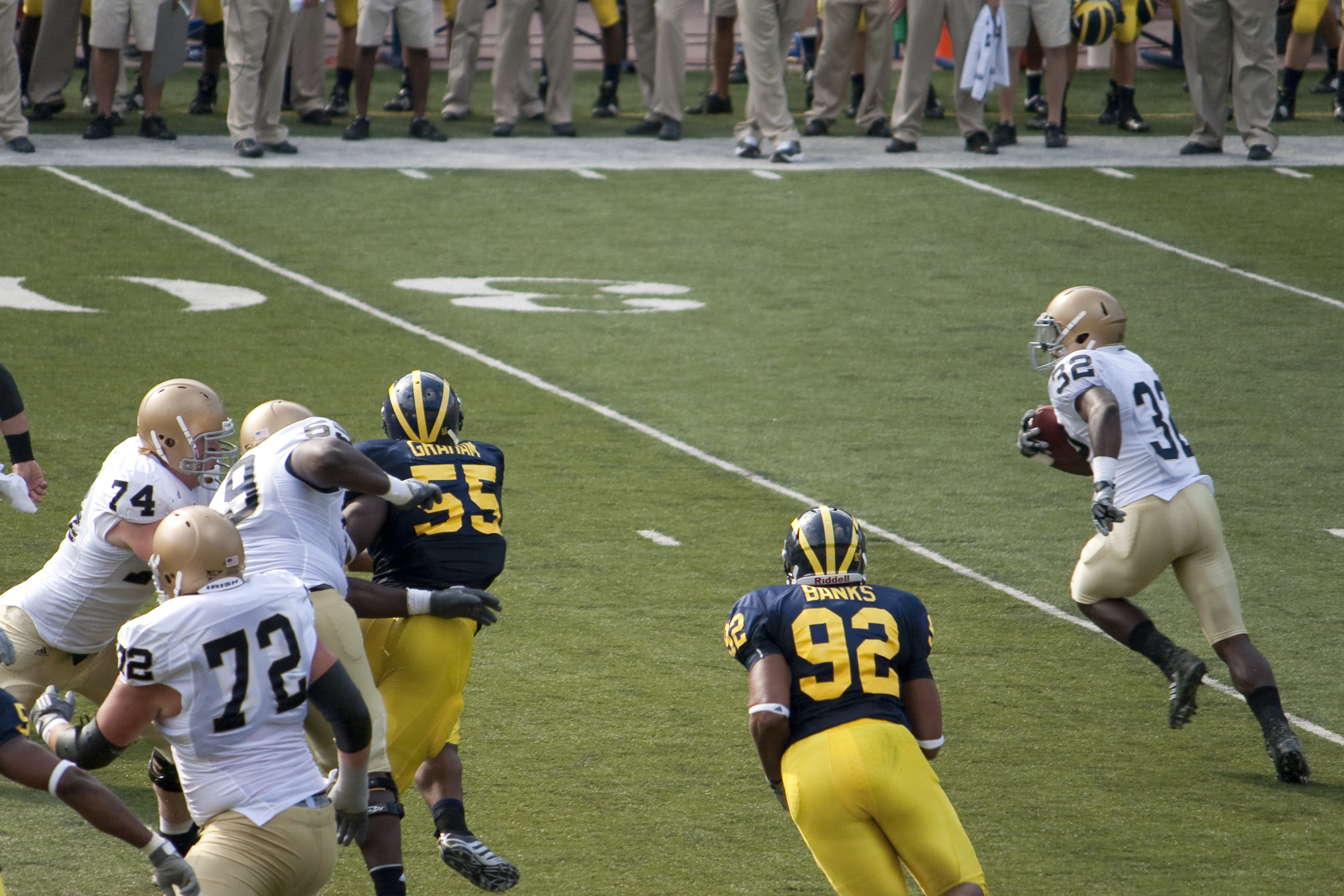
Theo Riddick carries the ball as Graham breaks through the line during 2009 Michigan-Notre Dame rivalry game.

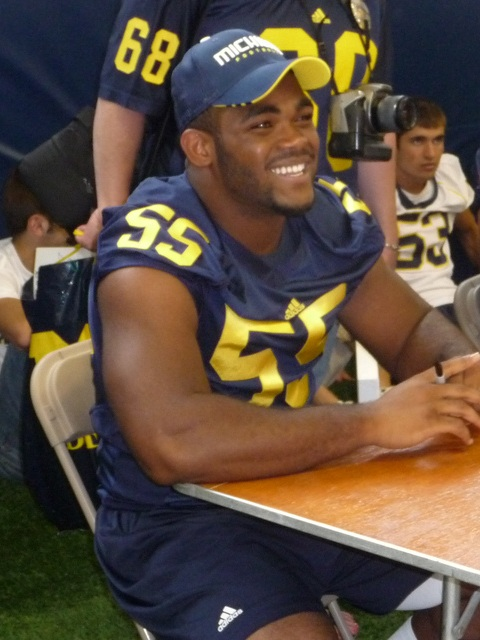
Graham on 2009 Fan Day

Graham began the 2009 NCAA Division I FBS football season as a watch lists candidate for the Bednarik Award, Hendricks Award, Lombardi Award, Lott Trophy, and Nagurski Trophy for the 2009 Michigan Wolverines football team. He was also selected by ESPN as the 10th best player in the Big Ten Conference before the season started. He concluded the season as the Chicago Tribune Silver Football recipient as the Big Ten co-MVP (with Daryll Clark). He was the seventh defensive player to earn the award and second in the last 25 years as well as the first co-recipient. Graham was the first player from a losing team in eight years and only the second player to win who was not either Big Ten offensive or defensive player of the year. He posted 26 tackles for loss in 12 games, which led the nation with 2.17 average tackles for a loss per game (ahead of conference rival O'Brien Schofield who was second with 1.884). His total of 10.5 sacks ranked fourth in the Big Ten Conference. Four times during the season, he recorded multiple sack games and he had three solo tackles for losses in four games. He ended his career at Michigan with 9 tackles for losses (8 solo and 2 assists) in his final two games, including a career-high 5 solo tackles for losses against Ohio State in the 2009 rivalry game, which was the final game of his career. Graham was one of seven finalists for the Hendricks Award. At the conclusion of the season he was a 2009 First-team All-Big Ten selection by the coaches and media. He was a First-team 2009 College Football All-America Team selection by ESPN, Rivals.com and Scout.com, and he was a Second-team All-American defensive line selection by the Walter Camp Football Foundation, Associated Press, Sports Illustrated, College Football News and The Sporting News. He was an honorable mention All-American by Pro Football Weekly (which had no second team). Graham was again selected as the team MVP, which made him the school's first defensive player to be two-time MVP. As of December 2009, Graham was the only Big Ten player on Mel Kiper Jr.'s "Big Board" Top 25. Brandon Graham earned MVP honors at the January 30, 2010 Senior Bowl with five tackles, two sacks, one forced fumble.

== Professional career ==
Pre-draft measurables
| Height | Weight | Arm length | Hand span | 40-yard dash | 10-yard split | 20-yard split | 20-yard shuttle | Three-cone drill | Vertical jump | Broad jump | Bench press |
|---|---|---|---|---|---|---|---|---|---|---|---|
| 6 ft 1 3/8 in (1.86 m) | 268 lb (122 kg) | 32 1/4 in (0.82 m) | 9 7/8 in (0.25 m) | 4.72 s | 1.65 s | 2.77 s | 4.25 s | 7.01 s | 31.5 in (0.80 m) | 9 ft 3 in (2.82 m) | 31 reps |
All values from NFL Combine/Pro Day

At the NFL Combine, Graham ranked 8th among defensive linemen with a 4.72 40-yard dash and 10th in the bench press with 31.

The Philadelphia Eagles selected Graham in the first round (13th overall) of the 2010 NFL draft. The Philadelphia Eagles acquired the selection after trading their first round pick (24th overall), third round pick (70th overall), and an additional third round pick (87th overall) to the Denver Broncos. Graham was the first defensive and Big Ten Conference player selected in the 2010 NFL Draft. He decided to wear number 94 for the Eagles immediately after the draft, but changed his mind and chose number 54.

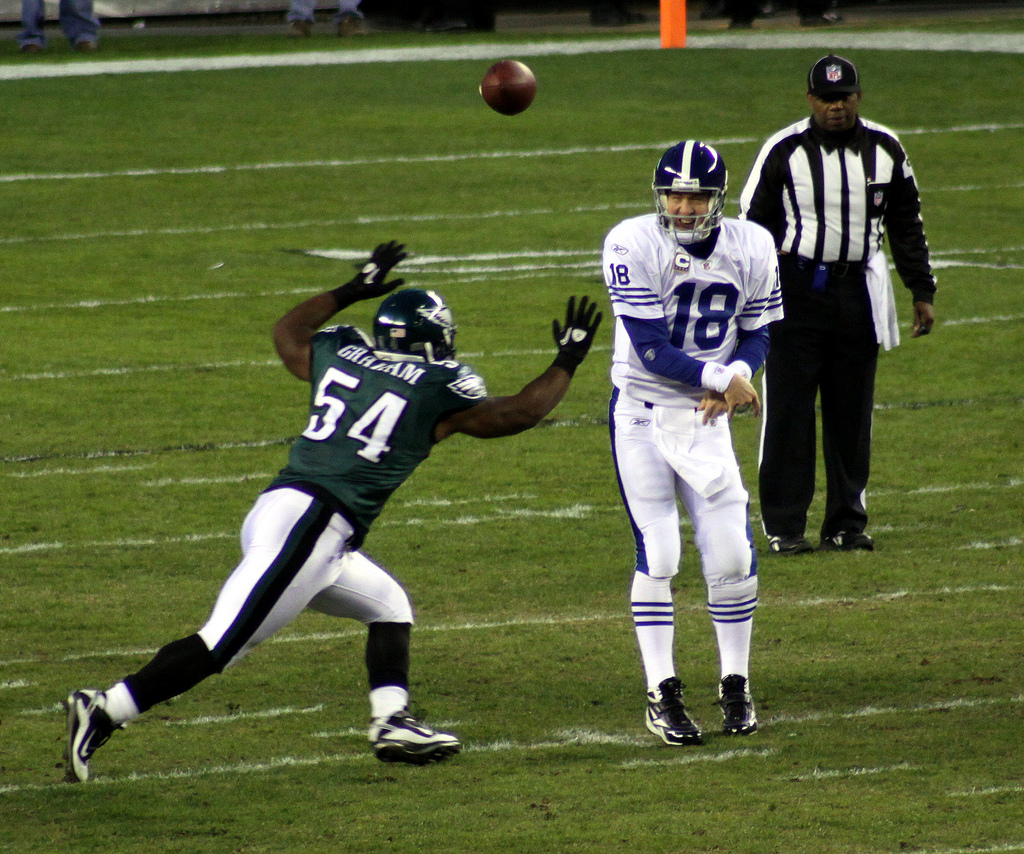
Graham pressures Indianapolis Colts' quarterback Peyton Manning during a 2010 game

On July 29, 2010, the Eagles signed Graham to a five-year, $16.90 million contract that includes $12.67 million guaranteed. Graham entered training camp slated as a starting defensive end. Head coach Andy Reid named Graham and Trent Cole the starting defensive ends to begin the regular season.

He made his professional regular season debut and first career start in the Eagles' season-opener against the Green Bay Packers, but did not record a statistic during their 27–20 loss. The following week, he recorded two solo tackles and made his first career sack during a 35–32 win at the Detroit Lions on Lions' quarterback Shaun Hill for a two-yard loss during the first quarter. On November 28, 2010, Graham collected a season-high three solo tackles and made one sack during a 31–26 loss at the Chicago Bears in Week 12. On December 12, 2010, Graham suffered a torn anterior cruciate ligament (ACL) during 30–27 victory at the Dallas Cowboys in Week 14. On December 14, 2010, the Philadelphia Eagles placed Graham on the injured reserve list. He underwent microfracture surgery on his right knee on December 21.

He was placed on the active/physically unable to perform list on July 28, 2011, before the start of training camp. He was removed from the physically unable to perform list so he could return to practice on October 24 and was activated on November 5, 2011.

In the 2012 season, Graham appeared in 16 games and started six. He finished with 5.5 sacks, 38 total tackles, one pass defended, and two forced fumbles.

In 2013, he moved from defensive end to linebacker. Many people had predicted he would become a linebacker at the professional level back when he was still in college. He finished the 2013 season with three sacks, 20 total tackles, and one forced fumble in 16 games.

In the 2014 season, Graham finished with 5.5 sacks, 47 total tackles, and four forced fumbles in 16 games and one start. His four forced fumbles finished fourth in the NFL.

After coming close to signing with the New York Giants in 2015, Graham signed a 4-year $26 million contract with $14 million guaranteed with the Eagles to remain with the team. In the 2015 season, Graham finished with 6.5 sacks, 51 total tackles, and one pass defended in 16 games and ten starts.

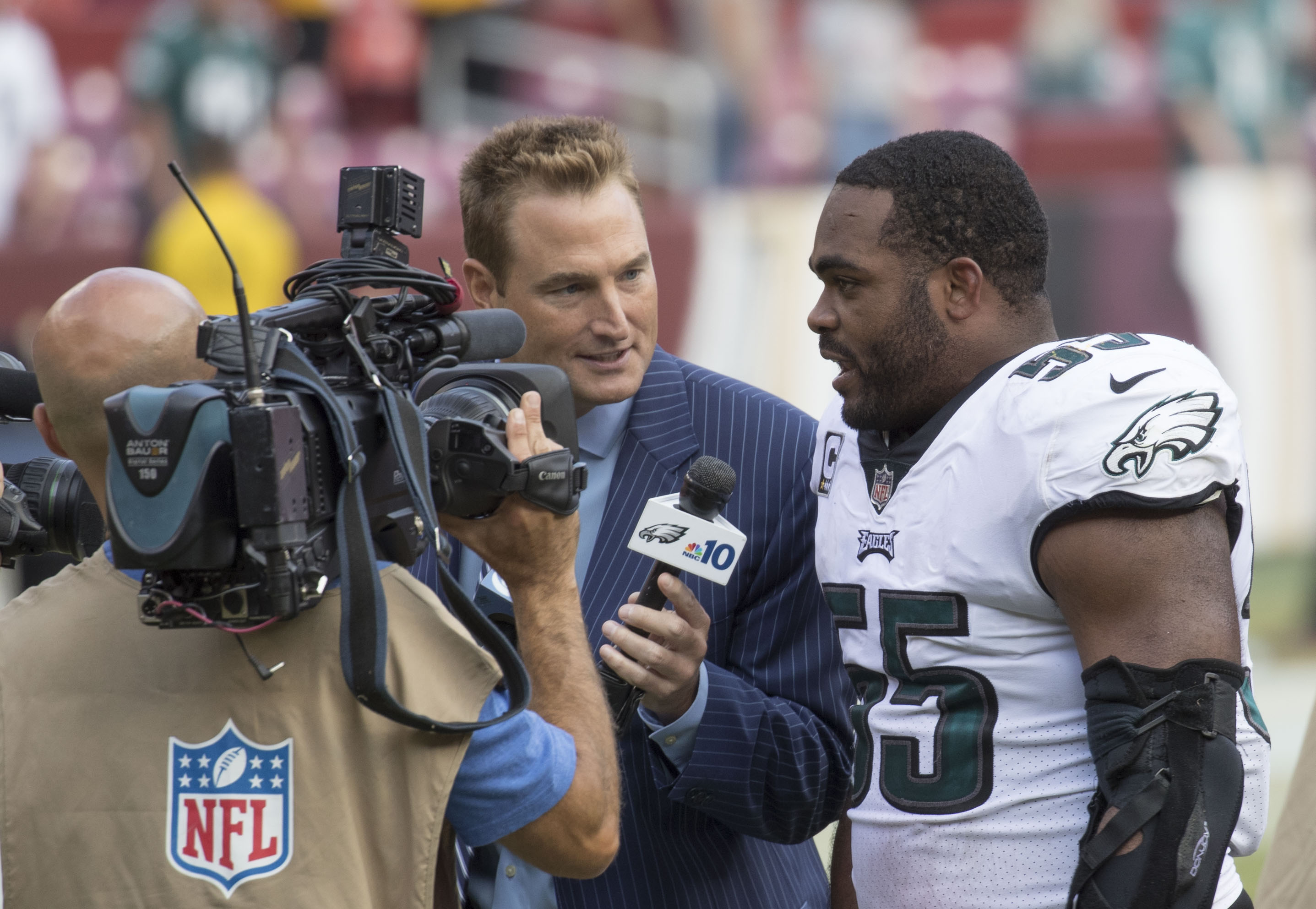
Graham talks to the media post-game in 2017

He posted 59 tackles, two forced fumbles, and 5.5 sacks for the 2016 Philadelphia Eagles. Following the 2016 NFL season, in which he moved back to defensive end under new defensive coordinator Jim Schwartz, he was named to the 2016 All-Pro 2nd Team by the Associated Press. He was also named a first team All-Pro by Pro Football Focus and All-National Football Conference (NFC) by the Pro Football Writers Association. and was rated as the ninth best player in the NFL by Pro Football Focus. He was ranked 93rd by his fellow players on the NFL Top 100 Players of 2017.

In his 2017 season debut, he recorded four tackles, two sacks, and a pass deflection in the Eagles' 30–17 win over the Washington Redskins. He earned multiple performance bonuses for the 2017 Philadelphia Eagles when he posted 9.5 sacks and 47 tackles. His 9.5 sacks led the team and were a career-high. During the 2017–18 NFL playoffs, he tallied two tackles for a loss in the final drive against the Atlanta Falcons on January 13. With 2:21 remaining in the fourth quarter of Super Bowl LII, he strip sacked Tom Brady, forcing a fumble recovered by teammate Derek Barnett. The Eagles won 41–33.

On May 16, 2018, it was revealed that Graham underwent ankle surgery earlier in the month, meaning that he missed some offseason practices. In 2018, he recorded 39 combined tackles, four sacks, and a forced fumble in 16 games and starts.

On March 1, 2019, Graham signed a three-year, $40 million contract extension with the Eagles through the 2021 season. In week 5 of the 2019 season against the New York Jets, Graham sacked Luke Falk three times in the 31–6 win. In week 8 against the Buffalo Bills, Graham recorded a strip sack on Josh Allen and recovered the ball in the 31–13 win. He finished the 2019 season with 8.5 sacks, 50 total tackles (35 solo), and one forced fumble.

In the 2020 season, Graham had eight sacks, 46 total tackles (35 solo), and two forced fumbles in 16 games and starts. He was named to the Pro Bowl for the 2020 season. He was ranked 99th by his fellow players on the NFL Top 100 Players of 2021.

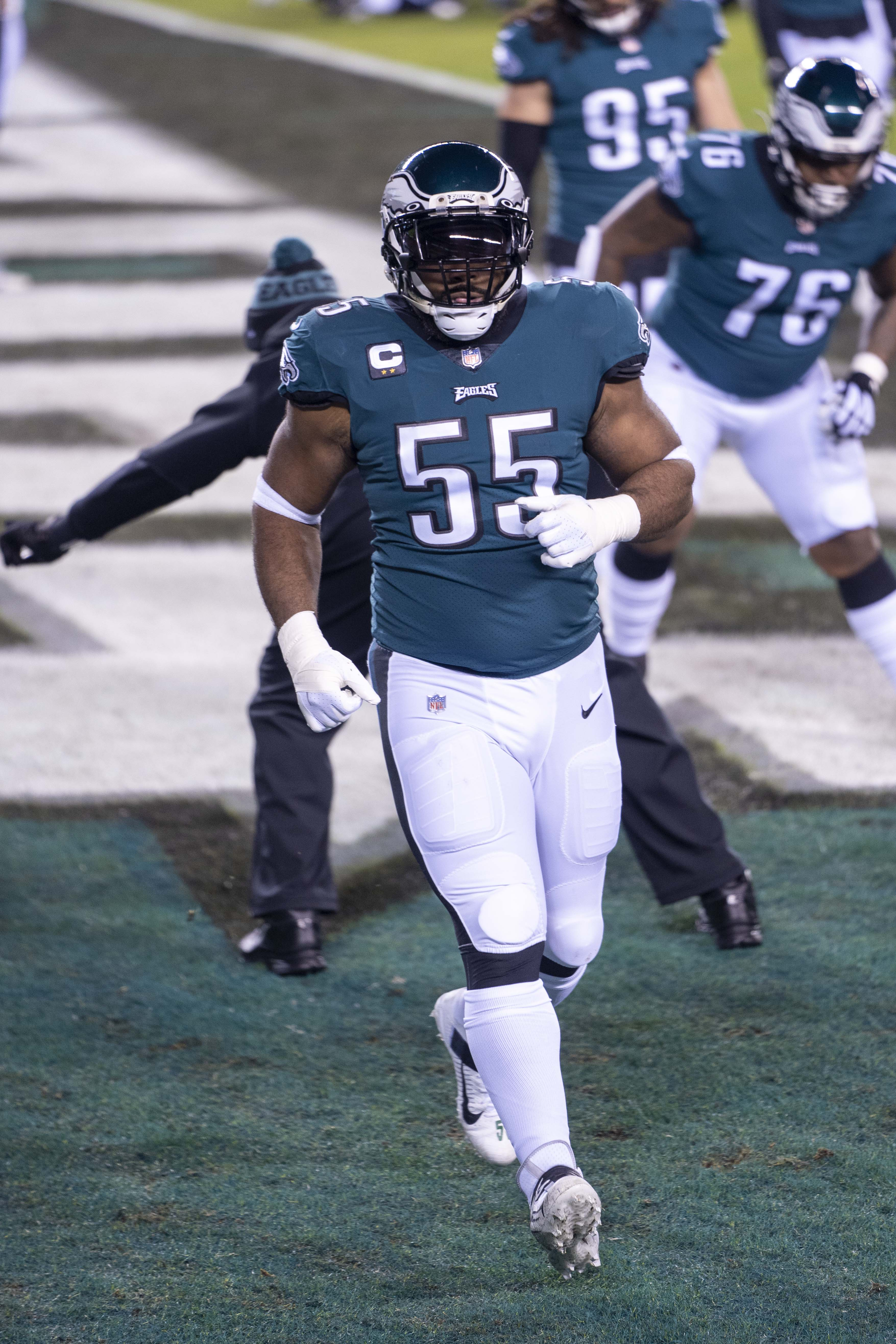
Graham in January 2021

Graham signed a one-year contract extension with the Eagles on March 15, 2021. In Week 2 of the 2021 season, Graham suffered a torn Achilles and was placed on season-ending injured reserve on September 21, 2021.

After recording 2.5 sacks, two tackles for loss, a pass defended, five quarterback hits and a forced fumble in week three of the 2022 season against the Washington Commanders, Graham was named NFC Defensive Player of the Week for the first time in his career. In Week 14, Graham had three sacks, four tackles, and a forced fumble in a 48–22 win over the Giants, earning NFC Defensive Player of the Week, his second of the season. Graham helped the Eagles reach Super Bowl LVII. It was Graham's second appearance in the Super Bowl. The Eagles lost 38–35 to the Kansas City Chiefs.

On March 10, 2023, Graham re-signed with the Eagles on a one-year contract. At the time, Graham was the longest tenured Eagle with 178 regular-season games played. In 2023, Graham tied Chuck Bednarik for most years as an Eagle with 14 seasons. On November 26, 2023, Graham passed David Akers' franchise record of 188 regular-season games played for the Eagles.

On March 9, 2024, Graham signed a one-year contract extension with the Eagles. In Week 12, he tore his triceps in the 37–20 win over the Los Angeles Rams, causing him to miss the remainder of the season; prior to the injury, he posted 13 tackles, 3.5 sacks, one forced fumble, 13 QB hurries, and 19 QB pressures. He was activated off injured reserve on February 8, 2025 in time for Super Bowl LIX. In Super Bowl LIX, Graham recorded one tackle in 13 snaps on defense as the Eagles won 40–22 over the Kansas City Chiefs. Graham also is one of just four players to appear on both Eagles Super Bowl-winning teams, along with Lane Johnson, Jake Elliott, and Rick Lovato. However, Graham also re-tore his triceps during the game and underwent surgery shortly thereafter.

During a press conference on March 18, 2025, Graham announced his retirement from professional football. Graham was one of a dozen Eagles players of the Super Bowl LIX championship team that did not participate in the White House visit in April 2025.

After the Eagles' defensive line suffered key losses to start the 2025 season, reports began to surface that Graham was considering coming out of retirement. On October 20, 2025, it was announced that Graham finalized a contract to return to the Eagles. On December 14, 2025, against the Las Vegas Raiders, Graham recorded two sacks of former teammate Kenny Pickett. In doing so, Graham became the oldest player in Eagles history to record a sack, passing hall of famer Richard Dent. He made nine appearances for Philadelphia, recording three sacks and eight combined tackles.

On September 8, 2026, Graham announced his retirement from the NFL for a second time.

== NFL career statistics ==
Legend
| | Won the Super Bowl |
| **Bold** | Career high |

| Year | Team | Games | | Tackles | | | | Fumbles | | | Interceptions | | | | | |
| Year | Team | GP | GS | Cmb | Solo | Ast | Sck | FF | FR | Yds | Int | Yds | Avg | Lng | TD | PD |
|---|---|---|---|---|---|---|---|---|---|---|---|---|---|---|---|---|
| 2010 | PHI | 13 | 6 | 13 | 12 | 1 | 3.0 | 2 | 0 | 0 | 0 | 0 | 0.0 | 0 | 0 | 0 |
| 2011 | PHI | 3 | 0 | 4 | 4 | 0 | 0.0 | 0 | 0 | 0 | 0 | 0 | 0.0 | 0 | 0 | 0 |
| 2012 | PHI | 16 | 6 | 38 | 30 | 8 | 5.5 | 2 | 1 | 0 | 0 | 0 | 0.0 | 0 | 0 | 1 |
| 2013 | PHI | 16 | 0 | 19 | 15 | 4 | 3.0 | 0 | 0 | 0 | 0 | 0 | 0.0 | 0 | 0 | 0 |
| 2014 | PHI | 16 | 1 | 46 | 35 | 11 | 5.5 | **4** | 0 | 0 | 0 | 0 | 0.0 | 0 | 0 | 0 |
| 2015 | PHI | 16 | 10 | 51 | 39 | 12 | 6.5 | 3 | 0 | 0 | 0 | 0 | 0.0 | 0 | 0 | 1 |
| 2016 | PHI | 16 | **16** | **59** | **41** | **18** | 5.5 | 2 | 1 | 4 | 0 | 0 | 0.0 | 0 | 0 | 1 |
| 2017 | PHI | 15 | 15 | 47 | 33 | 14 | 9.5 | 2 | 1 | **16** | 0 | 0 | 0.0 | 0 | 0 | **2** |
| 2018 | PHI | 16 | **16** | 39 | 31 | 8 | 4.0 | 1 | 1 | 0 | 0 | 0 | 0.0 | 0 | 0 | **2** |
| 2019 | PHI | 16 | **16** | 50 | 35 | 15 | 8.5 | 1 | **2** | 4 | 0 | 0 | 0.0 | 0 | 0 | 0 |
| 2020 | PHI | 16 | **16** | 46 | 35 | 11 | 8.0 | 2 | 1 | 0 | 0 | 0 | 0.0 | 0 | 0 | 0 |
| 2021 | PHI | 2 | 2 | 2 | 2 | 0 | 0.0 | 0 | 0 | 0 | 0 | 0 | 0.0 | 0 | 0 | 0 |
| 2022 | PHI | **17** | 1 | 35 | 19 | 16 | **11.0** | 2 | 0 | 0 | 0 | 0 | 0.0 | 0 | 0 | 1 |
| 2023 | PHI | **17** | 0 | 16 | 11 | 5 | 3.0 | 0 | 0 | 0 | 0 | 0 | 0.0 | 0 | 0 | 1 |
| 2024 | PHI | 11 | 1 | 20 | 15 | 5 | 3.5 | 1 | 0 | 0 | 0 | 0 | 0.0 | 0 | 0 | **2** |
| 2025 | PHI | 9 | 0 | 8 | 4 | 4 | 3.0 | 0 | 0 | 0 | 0 | 0 | 0.0 | 0 | 0 | 0 |
| Career | | 215 | 106 | 495 | 363 | 132 | 79.5 | 22 | 7 | 24 | 0 | 0 | 0.0 | 0 | 0 | 11 |

== Personal life ==
Graham is a Christian. He is married to Carlyne Graham.

In 2022, Graham provided vocals on the Christmas album A Philly Special Christmas.
