= St. Louis Area Resources for Community and Human Services =

Area Resources for Community and Human Services (ARCHS) is a not-for-profit organization that designs, manages, and evaluates education and social service programs. ARCHS is contracted to serve as the official "Community Partnership" for Greater St. Louis on behalf of the State of Missouri – one of 20 similar organizations across Missouri.

== About ARCHS ==
ARCHS does not directly provide programs or services to the general public. Currently ARCHS has service delivery partners around Greater St. Louis and surrounding areas.

== History ==
Area Resources for Community and Human Services (ARCHS) has a 16-year history. Established as a 501(c)(3) not-for-profit organization in 1997, ARCHS is the official Community Partnership for the St. Louis region on behalf of the State of Missouri. ARCHS has a history of leveraging more than $200 million in public and private resources. ARCHS has been a three-time winner of a "What’s Right With the Region" Award by FOCUS St. Louis (2004/2012), been awarded the Healthcare Advocacy Organization of the Year by St. Louis American Foundation (2010), and a Distinguished Community Service Award for Education by Harris-Stowe State University (2011).

== ARCHS programs ==
ARCHS manages many programs that affect the St. Louis region. ARCHS Lifelong Learning philosophy centers around the notion that education is a necessity for success. ARCHS provides support to child care programs that are going through the accreditation or reaccreditation process. ARCHS' funded child care programs receiving start up and expansion and accreditation funding. ARCHS provided strategic technical assistance to nine area child care programs that achieved national accreditation.

=== K-12 ===
Since 2007, After School for All Partnership (ASAP) has provided funding to after school programs and oversees the management of their services. The partnership's plan is to gather diverse funders to pool resources for grants, develop a system for monitoring accountability and evaluation, and to provide quality improvement and professional development. ARCHS supports 45 after-school locations. Headed by ASAP, the program includes the addition of 27 new or expanded after school programs at area public and private schools, city recreation centers and community sites serving 1,283 students each school day, according to a release.

ARCHS' Kids Vision for Life partnership with Crown Vision Center, Essilor Vision Foundation, Inc., and University of Missouri–St. Louis School of Optometry provides free eye screenings to more than 12,000 children in grades K-6 at Saint Louis Public Schools and other St. Louis area public schools, to provide free eye examinations to students who fail the screening, and provide free eyeglasses to students who need them after completing the eye examination.

From FY09 to FY12, ARCHS' Gang Resistance Education and Training (GREAT) provided school-based, law enforcement officer-instructed classroom curriculum. The program's objective was prevention of juvenile delinquency, youth violence and gang membership. It served more than 3,100 Jennings School District K-8 students who completed courses taught by area law enforcement officers aimed at improving student life skills and decision-making to help reduce the impact of gangs and drugs.

In 2010, Missouri Division of Youth Services selected ARCHS to deliver its award-winning Community Mentoring Services Program (CMSP) to youth in the Greater St. Louis area. CMSP's goals are to decrease social isolation and exclusion, increase safety, increase stability and increase the control of choices and the meaningful use of mainstream resources.

=== Pre-K ===
From 1997 to 2012, ARCHS supported more than 80 child care centers that included a focus on providing safe environments, developing physical motor skills and healthy eating habits. In addition, ARCHS provided courses taught by nationally trained, local law enforcement officers, which focused on improving youth life skills and decision making to reduce the impact of bullying and drugs through their Gang/Drug Prevention Partnerships. Annually more than 3,000 children received this healthy start and 150 area jobs are impacted. Many of ARCHS’ early childhood standards to increase access and quality were used as models by the state.

The Missouri Department of Social Services Children's Division assigned ARCHS the task of helping to increase the quality of child care and education programs by providing support to child care programs that went through the accreditation or reaccreditation process in the St. Louis region, which also included National Association for the Education of Young Children accreditation. Throughout the program, ARCHS helped more than 50 child care programs with reaccreditation.

In 2009 the state of Missouri requested that ARCHS assume full responsibility for the St. Louis Educare program. Educare serves home-care providers in the Greater St. Louis area. The program focuses on children from the ages of birth to five years of age. The Missouri Department of Social Services, Children's Division supports ARCHS in this effort. Educare is open to registered/unlicensed child care providers who have signed up with the State of Missouri to provide care to four or fewer children. ARCHS' Educare will provide the training and on-site consultation needed to child care providers using the Emotional Beginnings curriculum.

The Missouri Department of Social Services requested ARCHS to assume responsibility of the Home Visitation program, which provides parenting skills education to help reduce child abuse and neglect. ARCHS' program serves more than 50 area families each year (450 over the past 7 years) with no substantiated claims of child abuse or neglect for any families enrolled in ARCHS' HVP. All families report an increased time spent on literacy activities with their children. ARCHS contracts the New Hope Community Center and Jennings School District to provide services in the City of St. Louis and Jennings.

=== Family and Community ===
As of 2010 ARCHS partnered with the Environmental Protection Agency to create the St. Louis Area Communities Against Toxics (SLACAT). In 2008 through another EPA grant, ARCHS partnered with the St. Louis College of Pharmacy and the local Schnucks Pharmacy chain to offer an RxMEDS disposal campaign at 20 locations in the greater St. Louis area. Previously, ARCHS assisted the Health and Dental Care for Kids clinic. Through ARCHS, the clinic was able to obtain grants that funded essential positions that otherwise would not have been attainable within their budget. ARCHS provides support to a regional Missouri HealthNet (MHN) education and outreach committee of community volunteers. ARCHS also promotes culinary-related careers through its prisoner reentry partnerships.

Since 2002, the Missouri Department of Corrections has worked with several state agencies to develop a model to help ex-offenders while they are in prison and once they are released. This model, called the Missouri Reentry Process, includes job skills training and placement, mental-health referrals, and housing programs. ARCHS provides the management oversight for the St. Louis Alliance For Reentry (STAR), a program that works within the Missouri Reentry Process to provide a pre- and post-release mentoring program that focuses on 18 to 35-year-old nonviolent offenders. The program provides life-skills and job-preparation training, financial literacy and health issues education, as well as emphasizing repairing and strengthening personal relationships. In addition, ARCHS co-sponsors the annual Missouri Reentry Conference with the Missouri Department of Corrections, Missouri Department of Social Services, and Family and Community Trust (FACT) held in Tan-Tar-A Resort in Osage Beach. The conference, which began in 2005, has speakers and workshops concerning issues surrounding Missouri's ex-offender population. The intent of the conference is to provide education and networking opportunities for corrections professionals and community-based partners involved in the state's reentry process.

ARCHS manages a St. Louis Adult Basketball/Life Skills program that is a partnership with the St. Louis Metropolitan Police Department, Department of Parks, Recreation and Forestry and Fathers' Support Center. The goal of the program is to establish relationships between young men and police officers while providing healthy exercise and teaching life skills.

== Impact ==
ARCHS had a $17.3 million impact on the region for FY 2013. Within that number, $6 million were grants and other revenues, and $11.3 million were funds provided by ARCHS' program partners, which includes 18,000 volunteer hours.
