= Great =

Great may refer to:

== Descriptions or measurements ==
- Great, a relative measurement in physical space, see Size
- Greatness, being divine, superior, majestic, or transcendent

== People ==
- List of people known as "the Great"
- Artel Great (born 1981), American actor
- Great Osobor (born 2002), Spanish-born British basketball player

== Other uses ==
- Great (1975 film), a British animated short about Isambard Kingdom Brunel
- Great (2013 film), a German short film
- Great (supermarket), a supermarket in Hong Kong
- GReAT, Graph Rewriting and Transformation, a Model Transformation Language
- Gang Resistance Education and Training, or GREAT, a school-based and police officer-instructed program
- Global Research and Analysis Team (GReAT), a cybersecurity team at Kaspersky Lab
- Great!, a 2018 EP by Momoland
- Great! TV, British TV channel group
- The Great (TV series), an American comedy-drama

== See also ==
- The Great (disambiguation)
