= 1924 Washington Senators season =

Major League Baseball season

1924 Washington Senators
- World Series champions American League champions
- The team visiting the White House and meeting with President Calvin Coolidge.
- League: American League
- Ballpark: Griffith Stadium
- City: Washington, D.C.
- Record: 92–62 (.597)
- League place: 1st
- Owners: Clark Griffith and William Richardson
- Managers: Bucky Harris

The 1924 Washington Senators won 92 games, lost 62, and finished in first place in the American League. Fueled by the excitement of winning their first AL pennant, the Senators won the World Series in dramatic fashion, a 12-inning Game 7 victory.

== Regular season ==
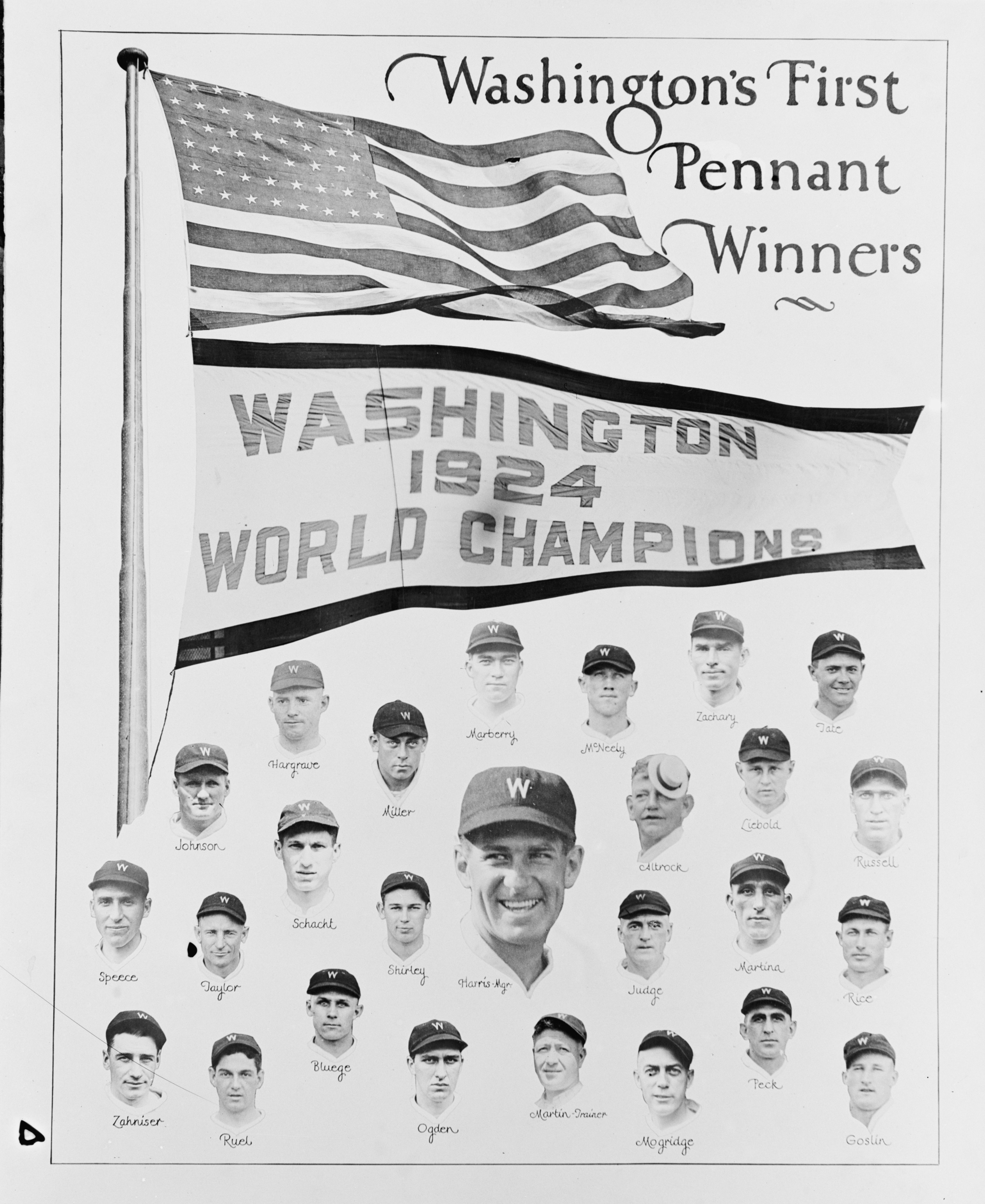
The team won the Pennant for the first time.

The Senators' offense was led by future Hall of Famer Goose Goslin, who was one of the youngest players on the team. He drove in a league-leading 129 runs. Walter Johnson had another outstanding year, winning the American League pitching Triple Crown and being voted Most Valuable Player. He anchored a staff that allowed the fewest runs in the league. Reliever Firpo Marberry paced the circuit in saves and games pitched. Manager Bucky Harris, who was also the team's starting second baseman, was the highest paid player on the team, earning $9,000.

=== Season standings ===
American League
| Team | W | L | Pct. | GB | Home | Road |
|---|---|---|---|---|---|---|
| Washington Senators | 92 | 62 | .597 | — | 47‍–‍30 | 45‍–‍32 |
| New York Yankees | 89 | 63 | .586 | 2 | 45‍–‍32 | 44‍–‍31 |
| Detroit Tigers | 86 | 68 | .558 | 6 | 45‍–‍33 | 41‍–‍35 |
| St. Louis Browns | 74 | 78 | .487 | 17 | 41‍–‍36 | 33‍–‍42 |
| Philadelphia Athletics | 71 | 81 | .467 | 20 | 36‍–‍39 | 35‍–‍42 |
| Cleveland Indians | 67 | 86 | .438 | 24½ | 37‍–‍38 | 30‍–‍48 |
| Boston Red Sox | 67 | 87 | .435 | 25 | 41‍–‍36 | 26‍–‍51 |
| Chicago White Sox | 66 | 87 | .431 | 25½ | 37‍–‍39 | 29‍–‍48 |

=== Record vs. opponents ===
1924 American League record Sources:
| Team | BOS | CWS | CLE | DET | NYY | PHA | SLB | WSH |
|---|---|---|---|---|---|---|---|---|
| Boston | — | 10–12 | 14–8 | 6–16 | 5–17–1 | 12–10 | 11–11–1 | 9–13–1 |
| Chicago | 12–10 | — | 11–11 | 8–14–1 | 6–16 | 11–11 | 13–8 | 5–17 |
| Cleveland | 8–14 | 11–11 | — | 7–15 | 8–14 | 11–11 | 11–10 | 11–11 |
| Detroit | 16–6 | 14–8–1 | 15–7 | — | 13–9 | 11–11 | 9–13 | 8–14–1 |
| New York | 17–5–1 | 16–6 | 14–8 | 9–13 | — | 12–8 | 12–10 | 9–13 |
| Philadelphia | 10–12 | 11–11 | 11–11 | 11–11 | 8–12 | — | 13–9 | 7–15 |
| St. Louis | 11–11–1 | 8–13 | 10–11 | 13–9 | 10–12 | 9–13 | — | 13–9 |
| Washington | 13–9–1 | 17–5 | 11–11 | 14–8–1 | 13–9 | 15–7 | 9–13 | — |

=== Roster ===
1924 Washington Senators
Roster
| Pitchers: Nick Altrock; Walter Johnson; Firpo Marberry; Joe Martina; Slim McGrew; George Mogridge; Curly Ogden; Allen Russell; By Speece; Ted Wingfield; Tom Zachary; Paul Zahniser | Catchers: Pinky Hargrave; Muddy Ruel; Bennie Tate; Infielders: Ossie Bluege; Chick Gagnon; Bucky Harris; Joe Judge; Ralph Miller; Roger Peckinpaugh; Doc Prothro; Mule Shirley; Tommy Taylor | Outfielders: Carl East; Showboat Fisher; Goose Goslin; Bert Griffith; Wade Lefler; Nemo Leibold; Wid Matthews; Earl McNeely; Sam Rice; Lance Richbourg; Carr Smith | Manager: Bucky Harris; Coaches: Nick Altrock; Jack Chesbro; Ben Egan; Al Schacht |

=== Attendance ===
The Senators drew 584,310 fans to their 77 home games at Griffith Stadium, good for 4th place among the 8 American League teams and an average of 7,588 per game.

== Player stats ==
| = Indicates team leader |

| = Indicates league leader |

=== Batting ===
==== Starters by position ====
Note: Pos = Position; G = Games played; AB = At bats; H = Hits; Avg. = Batting average; HR = Home runs; RBI = Runs batted in

| Pos | Player | G | AB | H | Avg. | HR | RBI |
|---|---|---|---|---|---|---|---|
| C | Muddy Ruel | 149 | 501 | 142 | .283 | 0 | 57 |
| 1B | Joe Judge | 140 | 516 | 167 | .324 | 3 | 79 |
| 2B | Bucky Harris | 143 | 544 | 146 | .268 | 1 | 58 |
| 3B | Ossie Bluege | 117 | 402 | 113 | .281 | 2 | 49 |
| SS | Roger Peckinpaugh | 155 | 523 | 142 | .272 | 2 | 73 |
| OF | Goose Goslin | 154 | 579 | 199 | .344 | 12 | 129 |
| OF | Nemo Leibold | 84 | 246 | 72 | .293 | 0 | 20 |
| OF | Sam Rice | 154 | 646 | 216 | .334 | 1 | 76 |

==== Other batters ====
Note: G = Games played; AB = At bats; H = Hits; Avg. = Batting average; HR = Home runs; RBI = Runs batted in

| Player | G | AB | H | Avg. | HR | RBI |
|---|---|---|---|---|---|---|
| Earl McNeely | 43 | 179 | 59 | .330 | 0 | 15 |
| Wid Matthews | 53 | 169 | 51 | .302 | 0 | 13 |
| Doc Prothro | 46 | 159 | 53 | .333 | 0 | 24 |
| Mule Shirley | 30 | 77 | 18 | .234 | 0 | 16 |
| Tommy Taylor | 26 | 73 | 19 | .260 | 0 | 10 |
| Bennie Tate | 21 | 43 | 13 | .302 | 0 | 7 |
| Showboat Fisher | 15 | 41 | 9 | .220 | 0 | 6 |
| Pinky Hargrave | 24 | 33 | 5 | .152 | 0 | 5 |
| Lance Richbourg | 15 | 32 | 9 | .281 | 0 | 1 |
| Ralph Miller | 9 | 15 | 2 | .133 | 0 | 0 |
| Carr Smith | 5 | 10 | 2 | .200 | 0 | 0 |
| Bert Griffith | 6 | 8 | 1 | .125 | 0 | 0 |
| Wade Lefler | 5 | 8 | 5 | .625 | 0 | 4 |
| Carl East | 2 | 6 | 2 | .333 | 0 | 2 |
| Chick Gagnon | 4 | 5 | 1 | .200 | 0 | 1 |

=== Pitching ===
| = Indicates league leader |

==== Starting pitchers ====
Note: G = Games pitched; IP = Innings pitched; W = Wins; L = Losses; ERA = Earned run average; SO = Strikeouts

| Player | G | IP | W | L | ERA | SO |
|---|---|---|---|---|---|---|
| Walter Johnson | 38 | 277.2 | 23 | 7 | 2.72 | 158 |
| George Mogridge | 30 | 213.0 | 16 | 11 | 3.76 | 48 |
| Tom Zachary | 33 | 202.2 | 15 | 9 | 2.75 | 45 |
| Curly Ogden | 16 | 108.0 | 9 | 5 | 2.58 | 23 |

==== Other pitchers ====
Note: G = Games pitched; IP = Innings pitched; W = Wins; L = Losses; ERA = Earned run average; SO = Strikeouts

| Player | G | IP | W | L | ERA | SO |
|---|---|---|---|---|---|---|
| Firpo Marberry | 50 | 195.1 | 11 | 12 | 3.09 | 68 |
| Joe Martina | 24 | 125.1 | 6 | 8 | 4.67 | 57 |
| Paul Zahniser | 24 | 92.0 | 5 | 7 | 4.40 | 28 |
| Slim McGrew | 6 | 23.1 | 0 | 1 | 5.01 | 8 |

Note: Firpo Marberry was team leader and MLB leader in saves with 15.

==== Relief pitchers ====
Note: G = Games pitched; W = Wins; L = Losses; SV = Saves; ERA = Earned run average; SO = Strikeouts

| Player | G | W | L | SV | ERA | SO |
|---|---|---|---|---|---|---|
| Allen Russell | 37 | 5 | 1 | 8 | 4.37 | 17 |
| By Speece | 21 | 2 | 1 | 0 | 2.65 | 15 |
| Ted Wingfield | 4 | 0 | 0 | 0 | 2.57 | 2 |
| Nick Altrock | 1 | 0 | 0 | 0 | 0.00 | 0 |

== Awards and honors ==
=== League top five finishers ===
Goose Goslin

- AL leader in RBI (129)
- #2 in AL in triples (17)

Walter Johnson

- MLB leader in shutouts (6)
- AL leader in wins (23)
- AL leader in ERA (2.72)
- AL leader in strikeouts (158)

Firpo Marberry

- MLB leader in saves (15)

Sam Rice

- #3 in AL in stolen bases (24)
- #4 in AL in triples (14)

Tom Zachary

- #2 in AL in ERA (2.75)

== Postseason ==
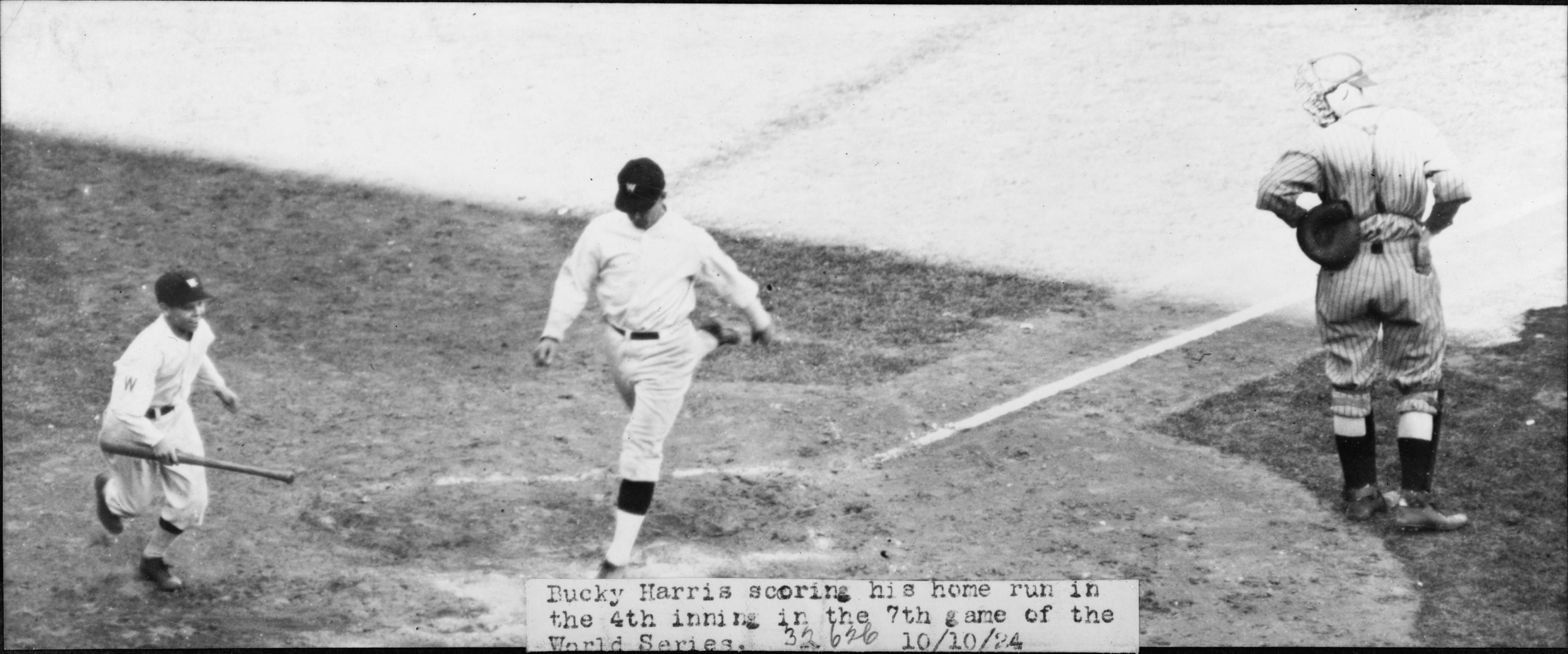
Washington's Bucky Harris scores on his home run in the fourth inning of Game Seven of the 1924 World Series.

The Senators finally made it into the postseason after many years of being the laughingstock of the American League. Behind ace pitcher Walter Johnson, they won the deciding Game Seven 4-3 in extra innings. The team returned to the World Series the next year and also in 1933, losing both, their last Series while playing in Washington. It wasn’t until 2019 that an MLB team based in the District of Columbia won another World Series.
