= Boonville Correctional Center =

Prison in Missouri, United States

Coordinates: 38.9753°N 92.7299°W

- Interactive map of Boonville Correctional Center
- Location: 1216 East Morgan Street Boonville, Missouri
- Status: open
- Security class: minimum
- Capacity: 1316
- Opened: 1983
- Managed by: Missouri Department of Corrections

Boonville Correctional Center (BCC) is located at 1216 East Morgan Street in Boonville, Missouri. It is a minimum security C-1 state penitentiary housing approximately 1,300 male inmates.

BCC was constructed in 1889 as the Missouri Training School for Boys. The facility was transferred to the Department of Corrections on July 1, 1983, and operates to this day in that capacity.

The property was listed on the National Register of Historic Places in 1983 as Historic District H. Notable buildings on its campus still standing are the Food Commissary and Supply Commissary, the oldest remaining buildings. They are accompanied by the old Administration Building which bears a dedication from its original construction under Governor John S. Marmaduke. Marmaduke had lost the First Battle of Boonville in 1861 as the commander of the Confederate forces directed to hold the city. The First Battle of Boonville occurred across the street from the present day location of the facility.

== Programs for Offenders ==
- Academic Education

Offenders who have not yet earned high school diplomas or equivalency certificates upon incarceration are required by statute to participate in adult basic education classes. Offenders who are younger than 22 who have learning disabilities are given the opportunity to participate in appropriate educational services, in accordance with the Individuals with Disabilities Education Act. Services include accommodations and modifications in classroom instruction and test taking.

- Higher Education

The Department of Corrections has partnerships with colleges and universities. Through these partnerships, offenders have the opportunity to take college courses and earn credits toward a degree.

- Vocational Training

Boonville offers Basic Welding, Electric Wiring Technology, Heavy Equipment Operator, and Manufacturing Technology

- Puppies for Parole

Puppies for Parole operates through partnerships with animal shelters and animal advocate groups statewide. In Puppies for Parole, selected offenders have the opportunity to become trainers to rescue dogs. Offenders teach dogs basic obedience skills and socialize them, making them more adoptable. Once the dogs have successfully completed the program, they are adopted through their original shelters.

- Restorative Justice
- Missouri Reentry Process
