= Missouri Department of Social Services =

State agency of Missouri, US

The Missouri Department of Social Services (DSS) is a state agency of Missouri. It has its headquarters in the Broadway State Office Building in Jefferson City. The department operates the state's social services.

In November 1993, Missouri Governor Mel Carnahan established the Family Investment Trust (FIT), which was changed to Family and Community Trust (FACT) by Governor Bob Holden in April 2001. FACT, which is housed within the Missouri Department of Social Services, is designed to lead a collaborative effort to improve the conditions of Missouri's families and communities. It is also to encourage a collaborative effort among both private and public community entities to build local support systems.

The Department of Social Services partners with families and communities to protect children, rehabilitate youth and move families to self sufficiency so that Missourians can lead safe, healthy, and productive lives. Administrative responsibility for agency activities rests with a department director appointed by the Governor with the advice and consent of the state Senate.

Agency programs are managed through its functional divisions. The department maintains field offices in each Missouri county and in the City of St. Louis.

A total of 21 Caring Community organizations were established around Missouri to implement this approach with six core results: parents working, children safe, children ready for school, children and families health, children and youth succeeding in school, and youth ready to enter the work force. FACT is the nonprofit corporation that governs the 21 partnerships. Funding to support this work comes from the state legislature through the Department of Social Services and is a combination of general revenue and a federal match.

There are currently 20 community partnerships across Missouri, including Area Resources for Community and Human Services (ARCHS) in St. Louis, Local Investment Commission (LINC) in Kansas City.

== Program Divisions ==
- Family Support Division (FSD)

The Family Support Division (FSD) exists to provide a continuum of support for families. FSD's goal is to assist families in maintaining or improving their quality of life. FSD accomplishes this goal for the children and families of Missouri by providing the best possible services to the public.

FSD services include: Income Maintenance programs, including the Food Stamp, Temporary Assistance and Medicaid programs; Rehabilitation Services for the Blind; and the Child Support program. Other programs include: Community Services Block Grant Programs; Low Income Home Energy Assistance; Refugee Resettlement; and Supplemental Nursing Care.

- Child Support (CS):

The Family Support Division (FSD) helps families by providing the following services:

Establish Paternity — FSD can help establish paternity (legal fatherhood) for children born to unmarried parents. If the parents are certain “dad” is the child's father, all the parents need to do is sign an Affidavit Acknowledging Paternity. If the paternity of the child is uncertain, FSD can arrange for a paternity test. If the test shows the man to be the child's father, FSD or the court may enter an order establishing paternity.

Establish Support Orders — FSD establishes child and medical support orders when a support order does not exist. When determining the amount of the child support payment, FSD staff use the child support guidelines established by the Missouri Supreme Court. The guidelines consider the income of both parents. The Missouri Child Support Amount Calculation Worksheet (Form 14) is used to calculate the child support amount.

Review Support Orders - FSD also reviews existing child and medical support orders to determine if the orders should be changed.

On a Temporary Assistance for Needy Families (TANF) or MO HealthNet case, Child Support either performs a review on its own or at either parent's request. On non-TANF cases, Child Support conducts reviews if requested.

Enforce Support Orders — FSD helps families receive their child, medical and spousal support by:

- Withholding income (wages, Workers’ Compensation benefits, unemployment compensation benefits, etc.);
- Intercepting federal and state income tax refunds;
- Ordering employers to enroll noncustodial parents’ children in health care plans;
- Reporting noncustodial parents who owe past–due support to credit bureaus;
- Filing liens on personal and/or real property;
- Intercepting lottery winnings;
- Suspending licenses (drivers, recreational, professional);
- Asking the prosecuting attorney to file civil contempt or criminal non–support charges upon request by the applicant for services; and
- Working with other states to collect support when noncustodial parents live outside Missouri.

Who is eligible for child support services?

The Missouri Family Support Division (FSD) is a state agency that provides child support services to:

- Custodial parents - parents who live with the children.
- Noncustodial parents - parents who do not live with the children.
- Custodians - relatives or non-relatives if the non-relative has legal custody or guardianship.
- Adult children - persons between the ages 18–21.
- Alleged fathers - men whose fatherhood is in question.
- The legal representative of the custodial parent's/custodian's estate when that person is deceased
- Children's Division (CD):

The Children's Division (CD) works in partnership with families, communities, the courts and other governmental entities toward assuring the safety, permanency, and well-being of Missouri's children. The Division's guiding principles are Protection, Partnership, Permanency, Practice Excellence, Prevention and Professionalism. The division works with all parties to safely maintain children in their homes whenever possible and to secure safe, permanent living arrangements when out-of-home placement is necessary. The Children's Division administers the Child Abuse/Neglect Hotline, School Violence Hotline, Intensive In-Home Services, Family Centered Services, Adoption Services, Independent Living, Foster Care, Residential Licensing and preventive services including Early Head Start, Stay-at-Home Parent Program, Child Care Start-Up and Expansion Program, Child Care Subsidy, and other early childhood and early intervention strategies. The division is responsible for the assessment and investigation of all reports to the Child Abuse/Neglect Hotline.

- MO HealthNet Division (MHD)

The MO HealthNet Division (MHD) administers the MO HealthNet (Missouri Medicaid) program. MO HealthNet provides medical services to eligible participants within defined program benefits in somewhat the same way insurance companies provide coverage for their policyholders. The services provided include those required by the federal government such as hospital and physician services. Also included are optional services such as pharmaceutical and personal care services authorized by the Missouri General Assembly and identified in state statute. A mandatory Medicaid managed care program is in place for eligible participants in the eastern, central, and western areas of the state. Children, pregnant women, TANF families, and children in state custody receive their medical care through managed care organizations, allowing the state to ensure access to health care and control costs at the same time.

The MO HealthNet Pharmacy Program oversees outpatient prescription drug reimbursement. The pharmacy benefit includes reimbursement for all drug products of manufacturers who have entered into a rebate agree with the Federal Department of Health and Human Services and that are dispensed by qualified providers, with few therapeutic category exclusions. In addition, MHD is responsible for program development, benefit design and clinical policy decision-making with activities oriented towards wellness and continuum of care. The MO HealthNet program includes specialized services for specific populations within the state by receiving waiver authority from the federal government. Home and community-based waivers for the elderly, certain developmentally disabled participants, as well as patients with AIDS were obtained and allow the MO HealthNet program to pay for otherwise non-covered home care as an alternative to more expensive institutional care. These services are restricted to those participants who would otherwise require, and whose home care is no more expensive than, institutionalization.

- Missouri Division of Youth Services (DYS)

The Division of Youth Services’ (DYS) mission is to protect communities from juvenile offenders in the division's care and custody and to provide appropriate services to youth and their families. This balanced approach to juvenile justice relies on community partnerships for the development and enhancement of services for the prevention of delinquency. DYS programs are established to provide the mandated services enumerated in Chapter 219.016 in the Revised Statutes of the state of Missouri. These services include assessment, care and treatment, and education of all youth committed to its care. DYS is charged with the care and treatment of youth committed to its custody by one of the 45 Missouri juvenile courts. Towards this end, DYS operates treatment programs ranging from non-residential day treatment centers through secure residential institutions. Additionally, DYS administers the Interstate Compact on Juveniles, operates an accredited school program, and maintains a statewide statistical database of juvenile court referrals. DYS is administratively organized into one central office and five regional offices.

- Rehabilitation Services for the Blind

== Director and Support Divisions ==
- Office of the Director
- Missouri Medicaid Audit and Compliance
- Division of Legal Services
- Research and Evaluation Unit
