= Joe Martina =

American baseball player (1889–1962)

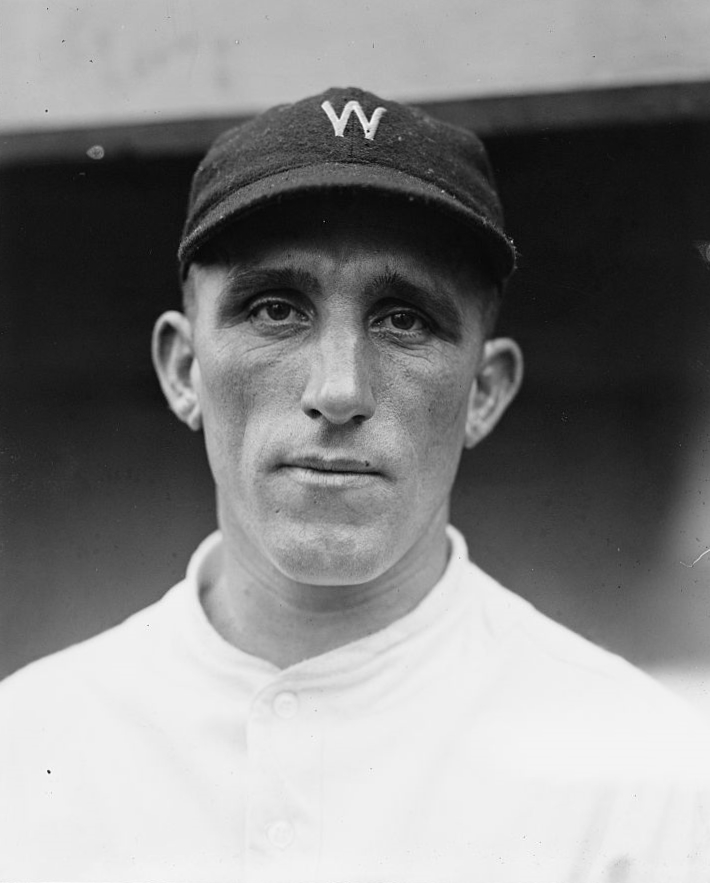
- Pitcher
- Born: July 8, 1889; New Orleans, Louisiana, U.S.
- Died: March 22, 1962 (aged 72); New Orleans, Louisiana, U.S.
- Batted: Right Threw: Right

MLB debut
- April 19, 1924, for the Washington Senators

Last MLB appearance
- September 30, 1924, for the Washington Senators

MLB statistics
- Win–loss record: 6–8
- Earned run average: 4.67
- Strikeouts: 57
- Innings pitched: 1251/3
- Stats at Baseball Reference

Teams
- Washington Senators (1924)

Career highlights and awards
- World Series champion (1924)

John Joseph Martina (July 8, 1889 – March 22, 1962), known as Oyster Joe, was an American professional baseball player. A right-handed pitcher and a native and lifelong resident of New Orleans, Louisiana, he spent 22 seasons in baseball, but only one year—1924—in the Major Leagues as a member of the world champion Washington Senators. He won 349 minor league games, with 277 defeats charged against him.

The 6 ft (1.8 m), 183 lb (83 kg) Martina began his career at age 20 in 1910 and by the time he hung up his spikes in 1931, he had won 20 games seven times, including a 28-win season in 1919 for the Beaumont Oilers of the Texas League. He was 34 years old when, after consecutive 20-win campaigns for his hometown New Orleans Pelicans of the Southern Association, he made the 1924 Senators' team. In Martina's only big-league season, he worked in 24 games, including 14 starts. He won six games and lost eight, posting eight complete games with no shutouts. In 1251/3 innings pitched he allowed 129 hits and 56 bases on balls, with 57 strikeouts. He compiled a mediocre 4.67 earned run average, well above the staff ERA (3.34).

But, led by Baseball Hall of Famer Walter Johnson's 23 victories, Washington won its first American League pennant; the Senators' 92–62 record put them two games ahead of 1923's champions, the New York Yankees, and into the 1924 World Series against the New York Giants. Martina appeared in Game 3 and set the Giants down in order in his only inning of work, retiring Hall of Fame hitter Bill Terry in the process. New York won that game, 6–4, but Washington triumphed in the series, four games to three, giving the capital its first baseball title.

Martina's lone inning pitched in the third contest was his last MLB appearance. He then returned to New Orleans in 1925 and over the next three seasons he won 23, 19 and 23 games.

Said his former minor league manager, Larry Gilbert: "Martina had a live fastball, sharp curve and good control, but his greatest asset was his durability. I never remember 'Oyster Joe' having a sore arm. He was a fierce competitor, great team man and one of the best conditioned athletes I've ever known."

Martina also played five innings at shortstop for the 1924 Senators, making one error in five total chances on September 30. During that season, he showed skill as a batter, with 14 hits in 43 at bats (for a batting average of .326), with two doubles.

His nickname was coined because his father was an oyster dealer. In one of professional sports' most peculiar transactions ever, Martina negotiated his own release from the Texas League's Dallas Steers in exchange for two barrels of oysters on December 28, 1929. The ball club had agreed to a barrel, but the local Dallas sportswriters successfully argued that he was worth an additional one which they shared amongst themselves.

Martina died from a heart attack in his home city at the age of 72, three decades after his last game in organized baseball.
