= The Great (disambiguation) =

The Great is the moniker for a number of people. The Great may also refer to:

- The Great (TV series), 2020 TV series on Hulu
- Symphony No. 9 (Schubert), symphony known as The Great
- Ashoka: The Great or Asoka (2001 film), a 2001 Indian film by Santosh Sivan about the ancient Indian emperor Ashoka

== See also ==
- Great (disambiguation)
