= Police Athletic League =

American youth coaching initiative

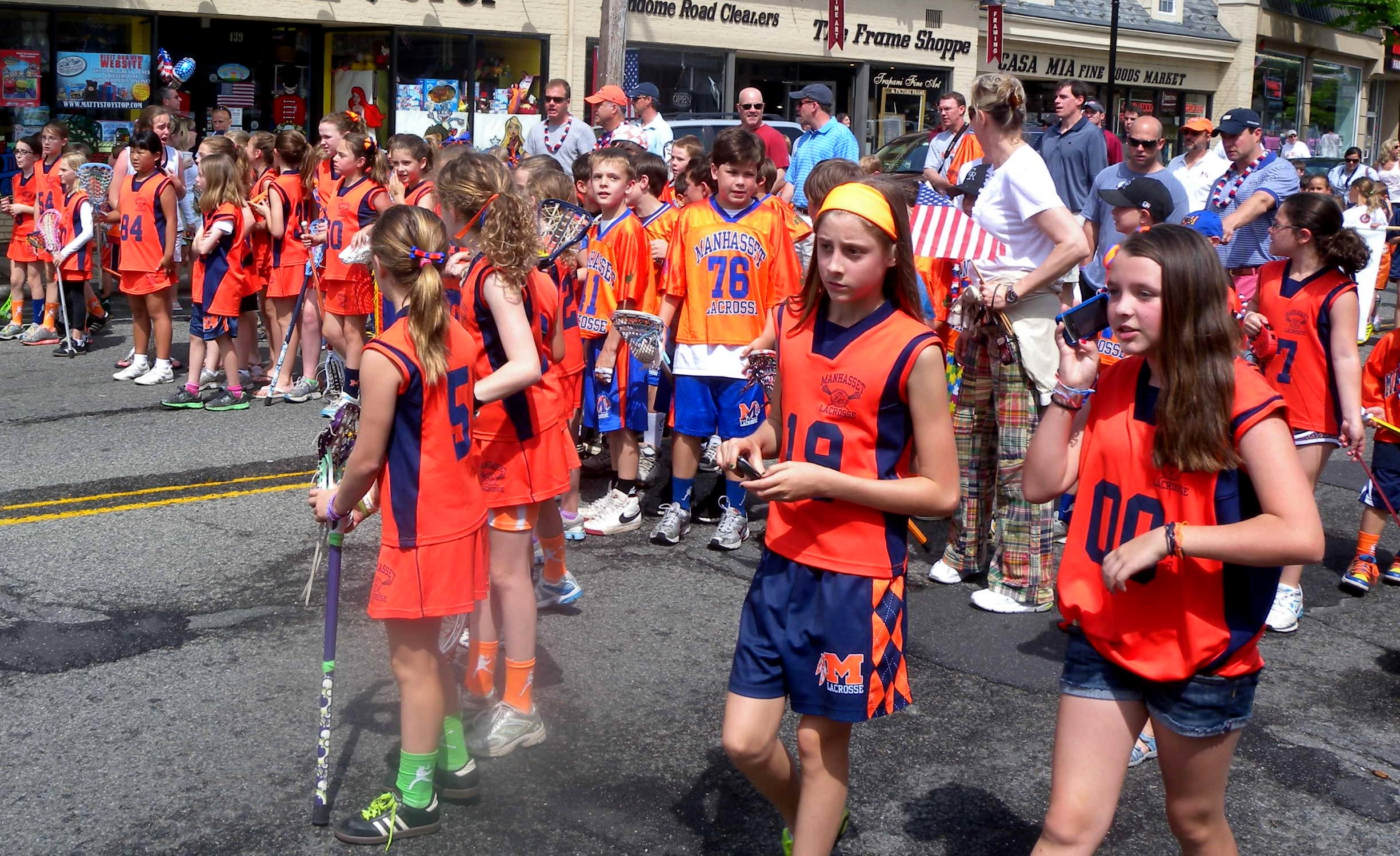
PAL members on parade

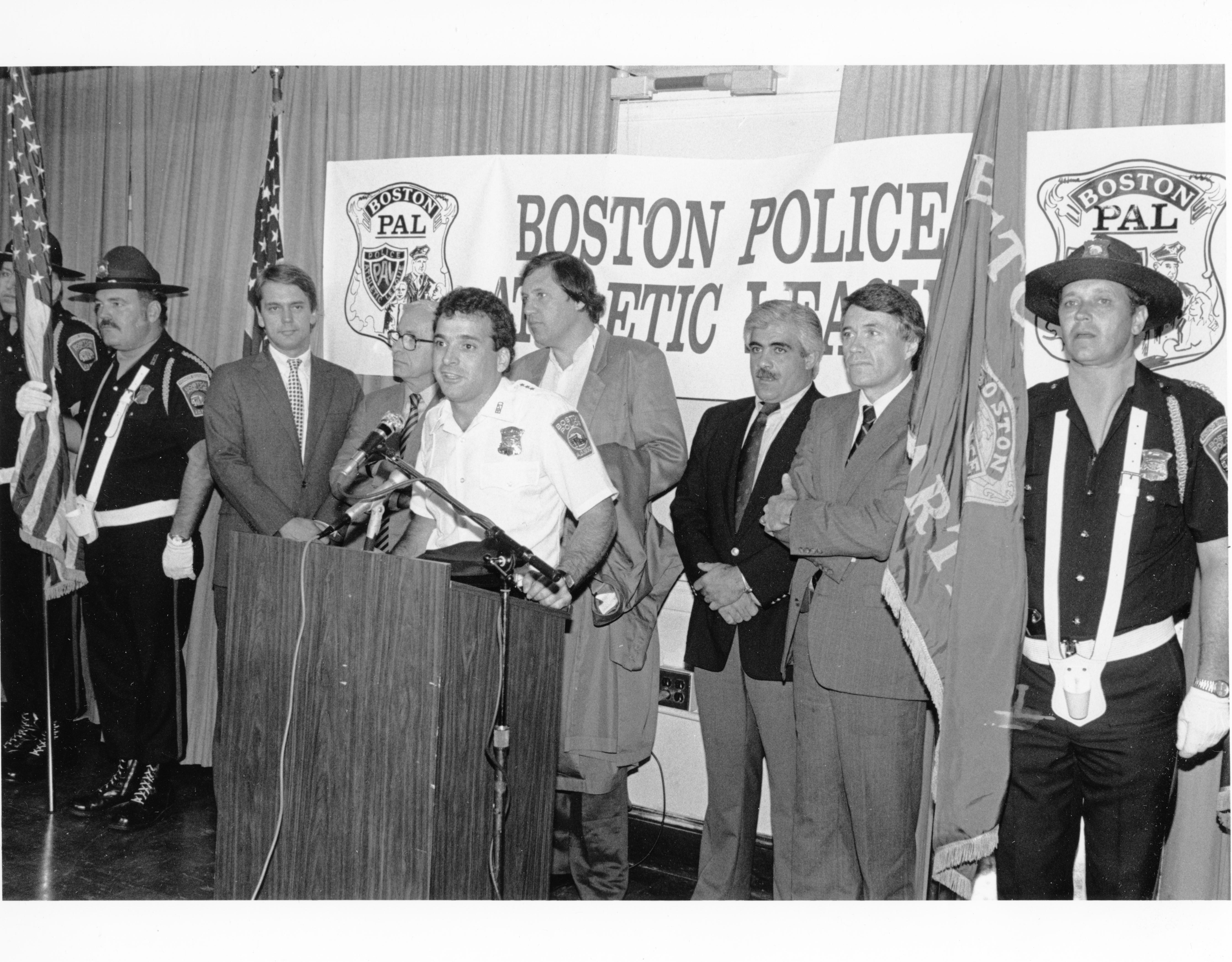
Boston Police Athletic League ceremony, c. 1984–1987

The Police Athletic League (PAL) is an organization in many American police departments in which members of the police force coach young people, both boys and girls, in sports, and help with homework and other school-related activities. The purpose is to build character, help strengthen police-community relations, and keep children off illegal drugs.

Most PAL programs now call themselves "Police Activities Leagues" because many of the programs are now focused on youth enrichment, educational and youth leadership programs and not just sports. Some organizations are also called Sheriff Activities Leagues (SAL) because their sponsoring agency is a Sheriff's Department.

According to local Police Athletic Leagues, the program generally solicits funds, equipment, and volunteer help from members of the community, so that the cost to taxpayers is small while the returns are great. Participants in the League's activities are supposedly much less likely to engage in crime, far more likely to praise the character of the police force, and discourage their friends from either committing crimes or covering up criminal activity.

Police Athletic League programs usually have a competitive component. Although the vast majority of the League's contests are with other youths in the same city, there are regularly scheduled national contests between teams in different parts of the country. For many of the young people who participate, it is their first chance to travel to where the contests are held.

The Police Athletic League provides participation in many sports. These include Soccer, Basketball, Football, and many other sports throughout the U.S.

The National Association of Police Athletics/Activities Leagues, Inc. is based in Washington, DC.

== History ==
In 1914, New York City Police Commissioner Arthur Woods led a "play streets" social movement which would convert vacant lots to playgrounds and prohibiting traffic from city blocks, to improve quality of life for children who lived in congested tenements. This led to improved relations between the children and the police force. When he inspected these playgrounds, mothers and children cheered his efforts to the improve their neighborhood.

Meanwhile, Captain John Sweeney of the Lower East Side 15th police precinct debuted a Junior Police program for young men to learn marching drills, don uniforms, and replicate police structure.

== See also ==
- Drug Abuse Resistance Education
- Gang Resistance Education and Training
- Police Athletic League of New York City
