= Championship team visits to the White House =

Sports tradition in the United States

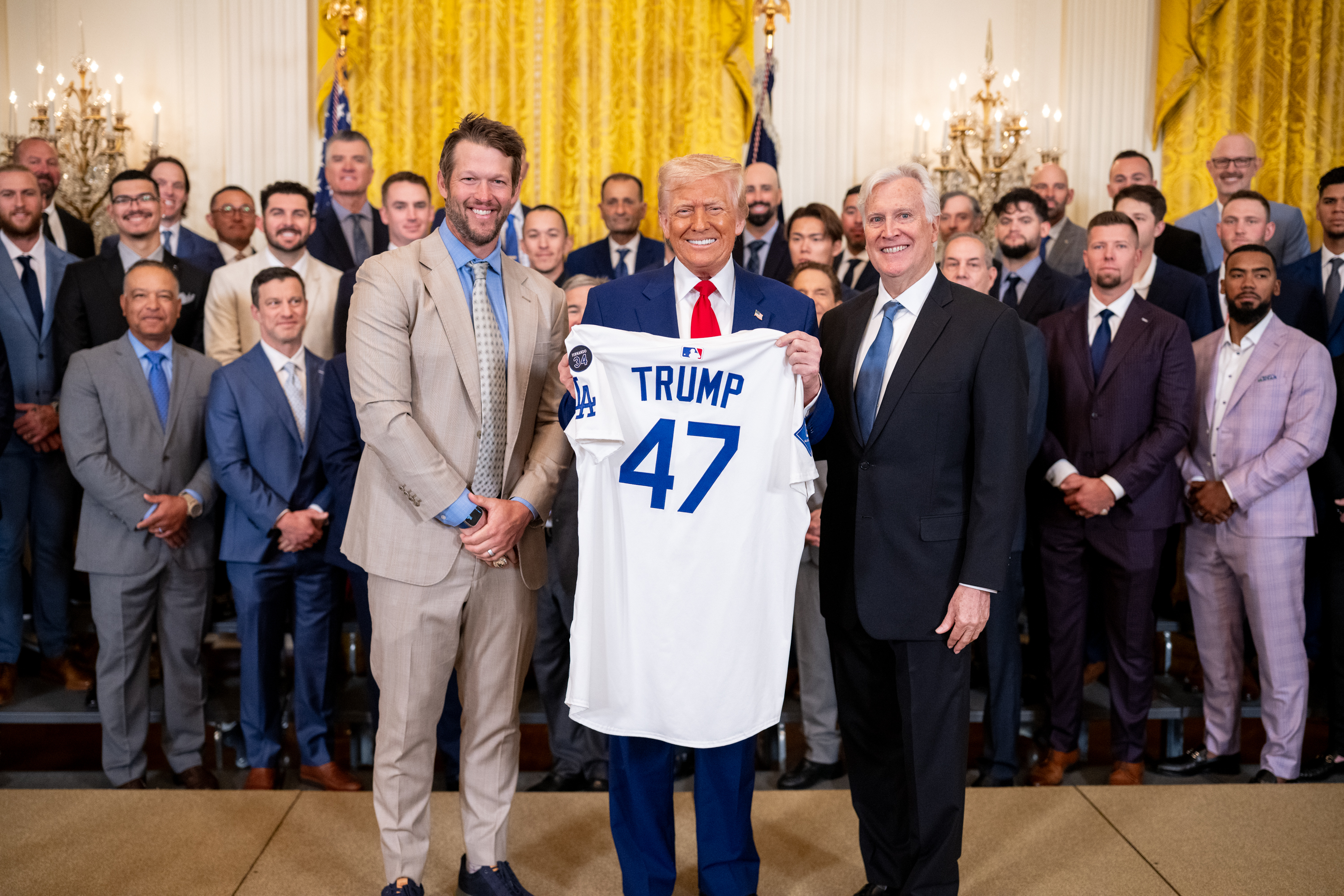
In April 2025, after winning the 2024 World Series, Donald Trump welcomed the Los Angeles Dodgers to the White House

In the United States, the winner of a professional championship game, such as the Super Bowl or World Series, often visits the White House after winning said championship. Usually, the championship team meets with whoever the president of the United States is at the time, and the president gives a speech related to the team.

== History ==
Although the exact start of the tradition of championship teams visiting the White House is unknown, the earliest known time it happened was on August 30, 1865. On that day, then president Andrew Johnson welcomed two amateur baseball teams to the White House: the Brooklyn Atlantics and Washington Nationals. The Atlantics visited because they had won the championship the previous season, and the Nationals visited because Johnson was a fan of the team.

The 1924 Washington Senators met president Calvin Coolidge following their World Series championship.

The first time a professional sports team visited the White House was in 1869 when the Cincinnati Red Stockings visited Ulysses S. Grant at the White House. It was not until 1924 that the first "Big Four" sports team visited the White House, that being the Washington Senators.

In 1963, John F. Kennedy welcomed the Boston Celtics to the White House, that being the first time an NBA team visited the White House.

In 1992, the Toronto Blue Jays became the first Canadian-based team to visit the White House, following their victory in the 1992 World Series.

== Visit refusals ==
In 1984, NBA player Larry Bird turned down his team's invitation stating, "If the president wants to see me, he knows where to find me.” Michael Jordan, after winning his first title with the Chicago Bulls in 1991, did not attend the team's visit because he wanted to play golf.

In 2011, Boston Bruins goalie Tim Thomas refused an invitation to visit the White House after the team's Stanley Cup win due to his belief that the federal government had grown out of control under the presidency of Barack Obama.

During the first presidency of Donald Trump many teams and individual players refused to visit the White House due to objections against the administration.

The 2017 College Basketball champion North Carolina Tar Heels refused a White House invitation due to Head Coach Roy Williams' criticisms of the Trump administration.

In 2017, after the New England Patriots won Super Bowl LI, many members refused to attend the traditional White House visit. While quarterback Tom Brady merely said he had personal reasons for not attending, five other Patriots said they did not attend because of political reasons.

In 2018, after the Philadelphia Eagles won Super Bowl LII and were invited to the White House, president Trump revoked the invite due to a potential boycott from the Eagles players.

Following the team's 2018 Stanley Cup win, three members of the Washington Capitals declined their invitation to visit the White House. While Braden Holtby and Devante Smith-Pelly refused due to conflicting personal beliefs, Brett Connolly explained that he did so out of respect for Smith-Pelly.

Following their Super Bowl win in 2019, several members of the Patriots including star quarterback Tom Brady declined to attend the team's White House visit. Tight end Martellus Bennett explained his absence to reporters prior, "Basic reason for me is I don't feel accepted in the White House. With the president having so many strong opinions and prejudices, I believe certain people might feel accepted there while others won't."

During the 2019 FIFA Women's World Cup when asked if she was excited about potentially visiting the White House along with the United States women's national soccer team, Megan Rapinoe replied that she would not be going and doubted she would even be invited. In response Trump shared on Twitter that he would invite the team whether they won or lost. Rapinoe's teammate Ali Krieger agreed she had no interest in a White House visit as she did not support the administration's policies. The team did not end up visiting the White House.

In 2023, the Georgia Bulldogs declined the White House invitation from President Joe Biden.

In 2024, the NBA champion Denver Nuggets skipped White House visit because of scheduling issues.

In April 2025, twelve Philadelphia Eagles players skipped out on the second Trump administration's invitation to visit the White House after the team's Super Bowl win.

In June 2025, the WNBA champion New York Liberty were not invited to the White House. During a road trip to Washington, when the White House visits usually occur, they met with President Barack Obama instead.

At the 2026 Winter Olympics both the US Women's and Men's hockey teams won gold. During a phone call with the men's team following their victory, President Trump invited both teams to the White House and State of the Union. The women declined the invitation citing scheduling conflicts. The Men's team's visit on February 24, prior to the State of the Union address was attended by all but five members of the team: Jake Guentzel, Jake Oettinger, Brock Nelson, Kyle Connor, and Jackson LaCombe. Kyle Connor, a member of the Winnipeg Jets team, explained that he skipped the visit so that he could better concentrate on the remainder of the season. Team USA figure skater and 2026 Olympic Gold Medalist Amber Glenn, a outspoken critic of President Trump, also declined to visit the White House.

In March 2026, the NBA champion Oklahoma City Thunder declined their invitation to the White House, citing a scheduling conflict.

In May 2026, Fernando Mendoza of the College Football Playoff champion Indiana Hoosiers declined the invitation, citing obligations to the Las Vegas Raiders.

== List of leagues, events, and organizations whose champions visit the White House ==
League/organization/event	First visit	First team/group/person to visit
MLB	1924	Washington Senators
Little League World Series	1992	Long Beach Little League
NBA	1963	Boston Celtics
WNBA	2000	Houston Comets
NFL	1980	Pittsburgh Steelers
NHL	1983	New York Islanders
MLS	1998	D.C. United
NWSL	2024	Gotham FC
Olympians	1961	Wilma Rudolph
NASCAR	1978	500+ guests (including Bill France Sr. and Bill France Jr.)
Tour de France	2001	Lance Armstrong (title later vacated)
NCAA FBS Football	1961	Alabama Crimson Tide
NCAA FCS Football	1995	Youngstown State Penguins
NCAA men's basketball	1976	Indiana Hoosiers
NCAA women's basketball	2009	UConn Huskies
