= Tommy Taylor (baseball) =

American baseball player

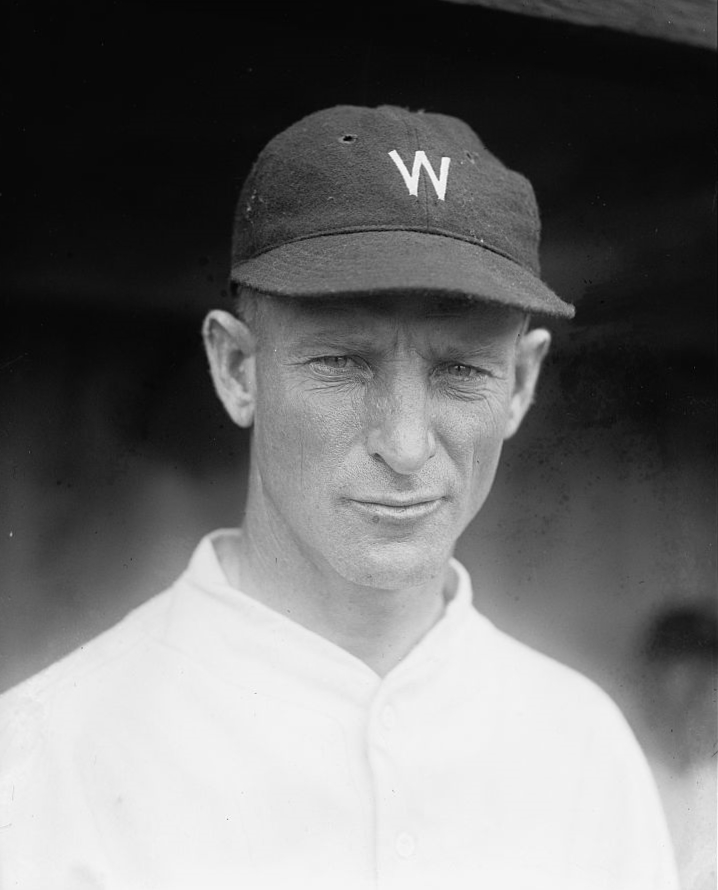
- Third baseman
- Born: September 17, 1892; Mexia, Texas, US
- Died: April 5, 1956 (aged 63); Greenville, Mississippi, US
- Batted: Right Threw: Right

MLB debut
- July 9, 1924, for the Washington Senators

Last MLB appearance
- September 30, 1924, for the Washington Senators

MLB statistics
- Batting average: .260
- Home runs: 0
- Runs batted in: 10
- Stats at Baseball Reference

Teams
- Washington Senators (1924)

Thomas Livingstone Carlton Taylor (September 17, 1892 – April 5, 1956) was an American Major League Baseball player. Taylor played for the Washington Senators in 1924, primarily as a third baseman. He played in 26 games in his one-year career. He had a .260 batting average, with 19 hits in 73 at-bats. He batted and threw right-handed.

Taylor was a member of the 1924 World Series championship team.
