= Great (2013 film) =

- Directed by: Andreas Henn
- Written by: Andreas Henn; Alexander Wasielewski; Gawain von Mallinckrodt
- Produced by: Alexander Wasielewski; Andreas Henn
- Starring: Milos Bikovic; Simon Schwarz; Paulus Manker; Roman Kanonik; Sandy Lopicic; Mirijam Verena Jeremic; Sebastian Brummer
- Music by: Sandy Lopicic
- Production company: Dog Ear Films
- Release date: January 2013
- Running time: 23 minutes
- Country: Germany
- Languages: German, Serbian

Great is a 2013 German short film.
