= Missouri Division of Youth Services =

State agency of Missouri, United States

The Missouri Division of Youth Services (DYS) is a state agency of Missouri that operates juvenile correctional facilities. A division of the Missouri Department of Social Services, DYS has its headquarters in Jefferson City.

== History ==
Circa the 1970s Missouri began shifting its juvenile corrections into a system that emphasizes smaller secure centers and with less emphasis on punishment. By 2006 many states were trying to copy Missouri's system.

== Facilities ==
DYS facilities include:

- Camp Avery Park Camp - Snow Hill Township, Lincoln County
- Fulton Treatment Center - Fulton
- Gentry Residential Treatment Center - Cabool
- Green Gables Lodge Treatment Center - Mack's Creek
- Hillsboro Treatment Center - Hillsboro
- Hogan Street Regional Youth Center - St. Louis
- Langsford House Youth Center - Lee's Summit
- Missouri Hills Youth Center - St. Louis
- Mount Vernon Treatment Center - Mount Vernon
- New Madrid Bend Youth Center - New Madrid
- Northwest Regional Youth Center - Kansas City
- Rich Hill Youth Development Center - Rich Hill
- Riverbend Treatment Center - St. Joseph
- Sierra-Osage Treatment Center - Poplar Bluff
- W. E. Sears Youth Center - Poplar Bluff
- Watkins Mill Park Camp - Lawson
- Waverly Regional Youth Center - Waverly

Girls' centers:

- Wilson’s Creek - Springfield

=== Former facilities ===
- Missouri Training School for Boys - Boonville
  - It opened in 1889. Its peak inmate population was 650. In 1938 it had been called the worst juvenile facility in the United States. By 1948 violent prisoners had killed two boys. As a result, Governor Phil M. Donnelly removed 71 prisoners from the training school and relocated them to an adult prison. He dismissed the board of the State Board for Training Schools, the juvenile correctional authority. It closed in 1983.
- Missouri Training School for Girls - Chillicothe
  - It opened in 1889, and closed in 1981.
- Missouri Training School for Negro Girls - Tipton - Opened in 1926, closed in 1956 and consolidated into the school in Chillicothe.
- Rosa Parks Center - Fulton - A center for incarcerated girls, it is a former university dormitory, located at William Woods University. It holds 10-12 girls at a time. WWU students are involved with the center.
  - DYS and WWU agreed to the joint project in 2000, and the center opened in January 2001 and shut down due to lack of state funding in August 2020.
- Babler Lodge - Wildwood Shut down August 2020
- Montgomery City Youth Center - Montgomery City Closed August 2020
- Northeast Community Treatment Center - Mexico Closed about 2016
- Delmina Woods, Forsyth, Missouri - Permanently Closed
- Cornerstone Group Home, Columbia, Missouri - Permanently Closed in 2020
