= Historic District H =

Historic district in Missouri, United States

- U.S. National Register of Historic Places
- U.S. Historic district
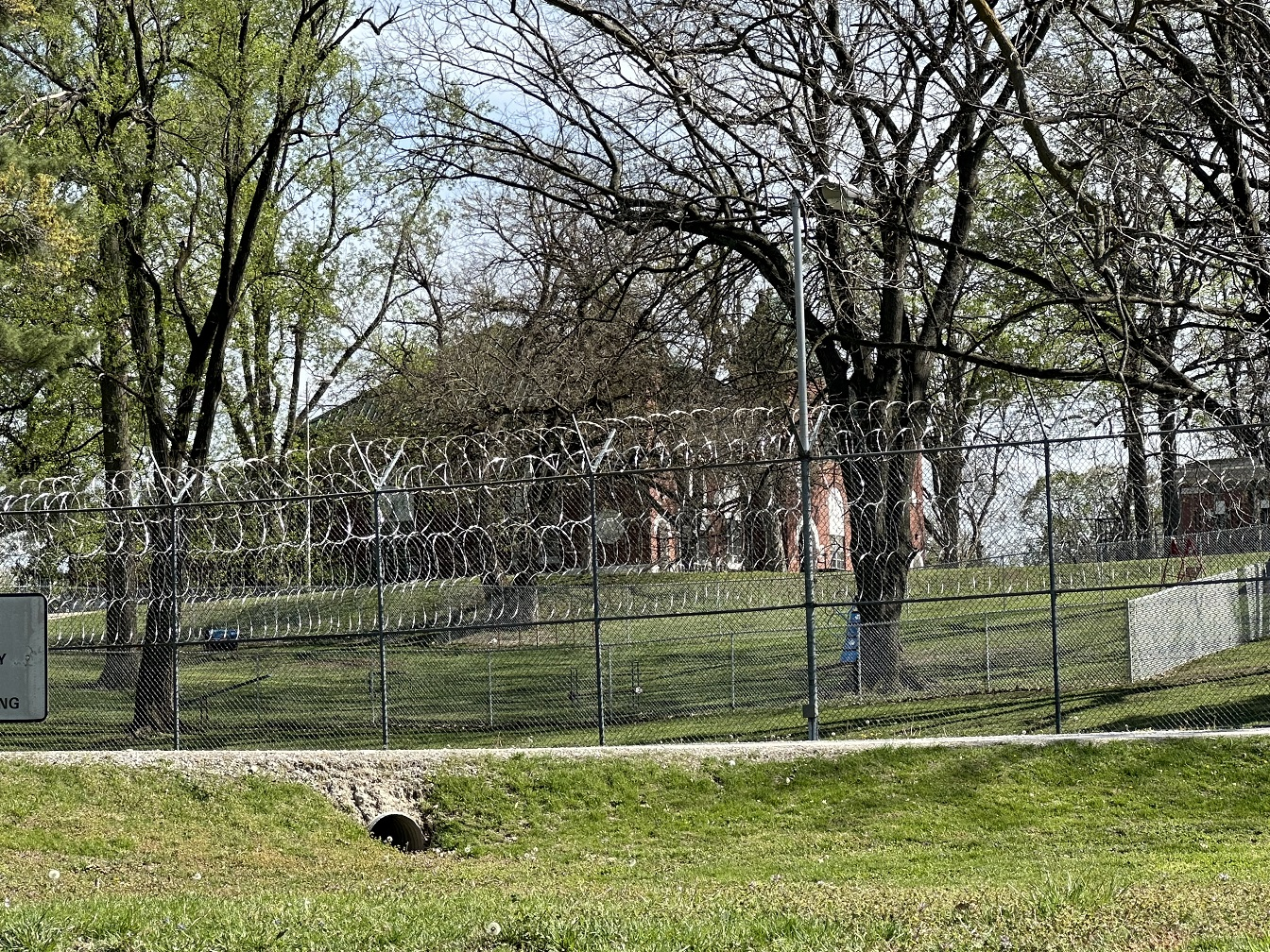

- Location within Missouri Location within the United States
- Location: SE corner of E. Morgan St. and Reformatory Dr., Boonville, Missouri
- Coordinates: 38°58′35″N 92°44′50″W
- Area: 37 acres (15 ha)
- Architectural style: Late Victorian
- MPS: Boonville Missouri MRA
- NRHP reference No.: 83000985
- Added to NRHP: January 24, 1983

Historic District H, also known as the Missouri Training School for Boys District, is a national historic district located at Boonville, Cooper County, Missouri. It encompasses 15 contributing buildings associated with the Missouri Training School for Boys, a state juvenile detention facility. The district includes representative examples of Late Victorian style architecture. Notable buildings include the Administration Building (1890), Superintendent's Residence (1910-1917), Dining Hall (1890s), Commissary (1910-1917), and Barn (1890s, 1931).

It was listed on the National Register of Historic Places in 1983.
