= Mule Shirley =

American baseball player (1901–1955)

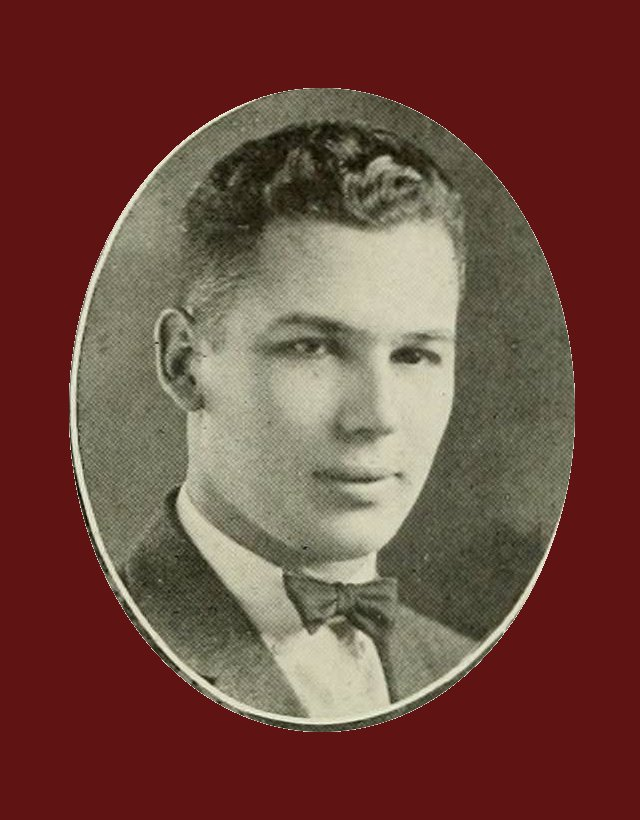
- First baseman
- Born: May 24, 1901; Snow Hill, North Carolina, U.S.
- Died: August 3, 1955 (aged 54); Goldsboro, North Carolina, U.S.
- Batted: Left Threw: Left

MLB debut
- May 6, 1924, for the Washington Senators

Last MLB appearance
- July 12, 1925, for the Washington Senators

MLB statistics
- Batting average: .210
- Home runs: 0
- Runs batted in: 18
- Stats at Baseball Reference

Teams
- Washington Senators (1924–1925)

Career highlights and awards
- World Series champions: 1924

Ernest Raeford "Mule" Shirley (May 24, 1901 – August 4, 1955) was an American Major League Baseball player who played first base during parts of the 1924 and 1925 seasons. He batted and threw left-handed. For the 1924 Washington Senators, he logged 100 regular season at bats. He appeared in three games of the 1924 World Series which the Senators won, registering one hit in two at bats, batting in one and scoring once. Shirley attended The University of North Carolina at Chapel Hill from 1921 to 1923 where he was a member of Theta Chi fraternity. He was the son of Octavius Shirley (March 4, 1884 – May 1, 1967) and Anna Shingleton (Shirley) (July 18, 1882 – September 30, 1944).
