= Gang Resistance Education and Training =

Gang Resistance Education And Training, abbreviated G.R.E.A.T., provides a school-based, police officer-instructed program in America that includes classroom instruction and a variety of learning activities.

The program was originally administered by the Bureau of Alcohol, Tobacco and Firearms (ATF) of the US Department of the Treasury; however, when the ATF was transferred to the United States Department of Justice, it became administered by the Office of Justice Programs of the Bureau of Justice Assistance.

== History ==
GREAT originated through a combined effort of the ATF and the Phoenix Police Department, Phoenix, Arizona. The effort was congressionally supported as part of the ATF's Project Outreach.

The program originally began as a nine-lesson middle-school curriculum. In early 1992, the first GREAT Officer Program was conducted in Phoenix, Arizona. In 1993, due to its perceived success, the program was expanded nationwide. In 1993–98, the program added the regional partners, a national policy board, and thousands of trained officers.

In 2000, the program underwent a curriculum review, which was the result of a study conducted by the National Institute of Justice. The original program went to 13 lessons. The new curriculum was piloted in 14 cities nationwide.

From 2006 to 2012, a multi-site program evaluation was conducted. Based on the results, the "program holds promise as a universal gang prevention program."

== Curriculum ==
Middle School Component: The curriculum has integrated National English Language Arts Standards and National Health Education Standards. The G.R.E.A.T. middle school curriculum was designed for students in 6th or 7th grade. The G.R.E.A.T. middle school curriculum consists of thirteen 30- to 45-minute lessons taught in sequential order:

1. Welcome to G.R.E.A.T.
2. What's the Real Deal?
3. It's About Us
4. Where Do We Go From Here
5. Decisions, Decisions, Decisions
6. Do You Hear What I Am Saying?
7. Walk in Someone Else's Shoes
8. Say It Like You Mean It
9. Getting Along Without Going Along
10. Keeping Your Cool
11. Keeping It Together
12. Working It Out
13. G.R.E.A.T. Days Ahead

Each lesson is accompanied by a parent letter that the student takes home, explaining the lesson and encouraging parent-student interaction:

1. G.R.E.A.T. Beginnings
2. To Do or Not to Do
3. Loud and Clear
4. Staying Cool When the Heat Is On
5. We're All in This Together
6. G.R.E.A.T. Days Ahead

== Officer selection ==
Officers will be under the supervision of the G.R.E.A.T. supervisor. Major disciplinary problems may result in the non-certification of the officer. G.R. Each agency will receive an evaluation of officer performance at the conclusion of the training, which begins with intensive one-week or two-week training.

== Evaluation ==
From 2006 to 2012, a multi-site program evaluation was conducted. Approximately 4,000 students attending 31 schools in seven cities comprised the initial sample. 195 classrooms (102 received G.R.E.A.T. and 93 did not receive the program) during the 2006–2007 school year. There were 28 attitudinal or perceptual measures that address potential outcomes of the G.R.E.A.T. program that were examined. The differences in rates of delinquency are 7% lower for G.R.E.A.T. students, and violent offences are 10% lower for G.R.E.A.T. students.

Results from analyses of six waves of survey data collected from students in seven U.S. public school districts indicate a 39% reduction in the odds of gang members joining one year post-program as well as a 24% reduction four years post the program.

=== Usage in arcade games ===
In the 1990s, GREAT had a message that appeared in arcade games with an emblem that read "GREAT LIFE: A Most Excellent Adventure Without GANGS" with the "GANGS" part in a crossed-out circle. On the left of the emblem is the Bureau of Alcohol, Tobacco, and Firearms logo with "Steve Higgins Director" under it, and on the right of the emblem is the Phoenix Police Department logo with "Dennis Garrett Chief" under it.

== See also ==
- DARE Program
