= New York Yankees all-time roster =

List of baseball players

The following is a list of players, both past and current, who appeared in at least one game for the New York Yankees franchise, including the 1901–02 Baltimore Orioles, and the 1903–12 New York Highlanders.

Players in bold are members of the National Baseball Hall of Fame.

Players in italics have had their numbers retired by the team.

* designates elected as a manager or executive.

== A ==
- David Aardsma, P, 2012
- Jim Abbott, P, 1993–1994
- Harry Ables, P, 1911
- Albert Abreu, P, 2020–2021, 2022–2023
- Bobby Abreu, OF, 2006–2008
- Juan Acevedo, P, 2003
- Alfredo Aceves, P, 2008–2010, 2014
- Dustin Ackley, 2B, 2015–2016
- Chance Adams, P, 2018–2019
- David Adams, IF, 2013
- Spencer Adams, IF, 1926
- Doc Adkins, P, 1903
- Steve Adkins, P, 1990
- Luis Aguayo, IF, 1988
- Jack Aker, P, 1969–1972
- Jonathan Albaladejo, P, 2008–2010
- Mike Aldrete, OF, 1996
- Doyle Alexander, P, 1976, 1982–1983
- Walt Alexander, C, 1915–1917
- Johnny Allen, P, 1932–1935
- Neil Allen, P, 1985, 1987–1988
- Bernie Allen, IF, 1972–1973
- Greg Allen, OF, 2021, 2023
- Carlos Almanzar, P, 2001
- Erick Almonte, IF, 2001, 2003
- Zoilo Almonte, OF, 2013–2014
- Sandy Alomar Sr., IF, 1974–1976
- Felipe Alou, OF, 1971–1973
- Matty Alou, OF, 1973
- Dell Alston, OF, 1977–1978
- Rubén Amaro Sr., IF, 1966–1968
- Trey Amburgey, OF, 2021
- Jason Anderson, P, 2003, 2005
- John Anderson, OF, 1904–1905
- Rick Anderson, P, 1979
- Clayton Andrews, P, 2024
- Ivy Andrews, P, 1931–1932, 1937–1938
- Miguel Andújar, 3B, LF, 2017–2022
- Dean Anna, IF, 2014
- Pete Appleton, P, 1933
- Ángel Aragón, IF, 1914–1917
- Rugger Ardizoia, P, 1947
- Alex Arias, IF, 2002
- Mike Armstrong, P, 1984–1986
- Harry Arndt, OF, 1902
- Brad Arnsberg, P, 1986–1987
- Luis Arroyo, P, 1960–1963
- Tucker Ashford, IF, 1981
- Paul Assenmacher, P, 1993
- Joe Ausanio, P, 1994–1995
- Jimmy Austin, IF, 1909–1910
- Tyler Austin, 1B, 2016–2018
- Chick Autry, C, 1924
- Luis Avilán, P, 2020
- Luis Ayala, P, 2011
- Oscar Azócar, OF, 1990

== B ==
- Loren Babe, IF, 1952–1953
- Harrison Bader, OF, 2022–2023
- Stan Bahnsen, P, 1966–1971
- Andrew Bailey, P, 2015
- Bill Bailey, OF, 1911
- **Home Run Baker**, IF, 1916–1922
- Frank Baker, IF, 1970–1971
- Steve Balboni, IF, 1981–1983, 1989–1990
- Neal Ball, IF, 1907–1909
- Anthony Banda, P, 2022
- Scott Bankhead, P, 1995
- Willie Banks, P, 1997–1998
- Manny Bañuelos, P, 2022
- Johnny Barbato, P 2016
- Steve Barber, P, 1967–1968
- Luke Bard, P, 2022
- Jesse Barfield, OF, 1989–1992
- Cy Barger, P, 1906–1907
- Ray Barker, IF, 1965–1967
- Frank Barnes, P, 1930
- Honey Barnes, C, 1926
- Jacob Barnes, P, 2022
- Ed Barney, OF, 1915
- Jake Barrett, P, 2019
- Chris Başak, IF, 2007
- George Batten, IF, 1912
- Hank Bauer, OF, 1948–1959
- Jake Bauers, OF, 2023
- Paddy Baumann, IF, 1915–1917
- Don Baylor, DH, 1983–1985
- Walter Beall, P, 1924–1927
- T. J. Beam, P, 2006
- Colter Bean, P, 2005–2007
- Jim Beattie, P, 1978–1979
- Brendan Beck, P, 2026-Present
- Rich Beck, P, 1965
- Zinn Beck, IF, 1918
- David Bednar, P, 2025-Present
- Fred Beene, P, 1972–1974
- Clayton Beeter, P, 2024–2025
- Joe Beggs, P, 1938
- Rudy Bell, OF, 1907
- Zeke Bella, OF, 1957
- Mark Bellhorn, IF, 2005
- Clay Bellinger, OF, 1996–2002
- Cody Bellinger, OF, 2025–present
- **Carlos Beltrán**, OF, 2014–2016
- Benny Bengough, C, 1923–1930
- Andrew Benintendi, OF, 2022
- Juan Beníquez, OF, 1979
- Armando Benítez, P, 2003
- Lou Berberet, C, 1954–1955
- Dave Bergman, IF, 1975–1977
- Lance Berkman, IF, 2010
- Walter Bernhardt, P, 1918
- Juan Bernhardt, DH, 1976
- **Yogi Berra**, C, 1946–1963
- Dale Berra, IF, 1985–1986
- Ángel Berroa, IF, 2009
- Jon Berti, IF, 2024
- Dellin Betances, P, 2011, 2013–2019
- Wilson Betemit, IF, 2007–2008
- Bill Bevens, P, 1944–1947
- Monte Beville, C, 1903–1904
- Phil Bickford, P, 2024
- Harry Billiard, P, 1908
- Bruce Billings, P, 2014
- Doug Bird, P, 1980–1981
- Greg Bird, IF, 2015, 2017–2019
- Jake Bird, P, 2025-Present
- Paul Blackburn, P, 2025-Present
- Ewell Blackwell, P, 1952–1953
- Rick Bladt, OF, 1975
- Paul Blair, OF, 1977–1980
- Walter Blair, C, 1907–1911
- Johnny Blanchard, OF, 1955–1965
- Gil Blanco, P, 1965
- Wade Blasingame, P, 1972
- Steve Blateric, P, 1972
- Gary Blaylock, P, 1959
- Richard Bleier, P, 2016
- Curt Blefary, OF, 1970–1971
- Elmer Bliss, P, 1903–1904
- Ron Blomberg, DH, 1969–1976
- Mike Blowers, IF, 1989–1991
- Eddie Bockman, IF, 1946
- Ping Bodie, OF, 1918–1921
- Len Boehmer, IF, 1969–1971
- Brian Boehringer, P, 1995–1997, 2001
- Brennan Boesch, OF, 2013
- **Wade Boggs**, IF, 1993–1997
- Don Bollweg, IF, 1953
- Bobby Bonds, OF, 1975
- Ricky Bones, P, 1996
- Tiny Bonham, P, 1940–1946
- Juan Bonilla, IF, 1985, 1987
- Lute Boone, IF, 1913–1916
- Aaron Boone, IF, 2003
- Chris Bootcheck, P, 2013
- Frenchy Bordagaray, OF, 1941
- Rich Bordi, P, 1985, 1987
- Joe Borowski, P, 1997–1998
- Hank Borowy, P, 1942–1945
- Babe Borton, IF, 1913
- Daryl Boston, OF, 1994
- Jim Bouton, P, 1962–1968
- Matt Bowman, P, 2023
- Clete Boyer, IF, 1959–1966
- Andrew Brackman, P, 2011
- Ryan Bradley, P, 1998
- Scott Bradley, C, 1984–1985
- Neal Brady, P, 1915–1917
- Darren Bragg, OF, 2001
- Ralph Branca, P, 1954
- Norm Branch, P, 1941–1942
- Marshall Brant, IF, 1980
- Rob Brantly, C, 2021–2022
- Garland Braxton, P, 1925–1926
- Don Brennan, P, 1933
- Jim Brenneman, P, 1965
- **Roger Bresnahan**, C, 1901–1902
- Ken Brett, P, 1976
- Marv Breuer, P, 1939–1943
- Billy Brewer, P, 1996
- Colten Brewer, P, 2023
- Fritz Brickell, IF, 1958–1959
- Jim Brideweser, IF, 1951–1953
- Marshall Bridges, P, 1962–1963
- Harry Bright, IF, 1963–1964
- Reid Brignac, IF, 2013
- Ed Brinkman, IF, 1975
- Jhony Brito, P, 2023
- Chris Britton, P, 2007–2008
- Zack Britton, P, 2018–2022
- Johnny Broaca, P, 1934–1937
- King Brockett, P, 1907–1911
- Steve Brodie, OF, 1901
- Jim Bronstad, P, 1959
- Tom Brookens, IF, 1989
- Scott Brosius, IF, 1997–2001
- Jim Brower, P, 2007
- Bob Brower, OF, 1989
- Boardwalk Brown, P, 1914–1915
- Bobby Brown, IF, 1946–1954
- Bobby Brown, OF, 1979–1981
- Curt Brown, P, 1984
- Hal Brown, P, 1962
- Jumbo Brown, P, 1932–1936
- Kevin Brown, P, 2004–2005
- JT Brubaker, P, 2025
- Jay Bruce, OF, 2021
- Brian Bruney, P, 2006–2009
- Jim Bruske, P, 1998
- Billy Bryan, C, 1966–1967
- Jess Buckles, P, 1916
- Mike Buddie, P, 1998–1999
- Jay Buhner, OF, 1987–1988
- Danny Burawa, P, 2015
- Bill Burbach, P, 1969–1971
- Lew Burdette, P, 1950
- Nick Burdi, P, 2024
- Tim Burke, P, 1992
- A. J. Burnett, P, 2009–2011
- George Burns, IF, 1928–1929
- C. B. Burns, PH, 1902
- Alex Burr, OF, 1914
- Ray Burris, P, 1979
- Homer Bush, IF, 1997–1998, 2004
- Joe Bush, P, 1922–1924
- Tom Buskey, P, 1973–1974
- Billy Butler, 1B, 2016
- Ike Butler, P, 1902
- Ralph Buxton, P, 1949
- Joe Buzas, IF, 1945
- Harry Byrd, P, 1954
- Sammy Byrd, OF, 1929–1934
- Tommy Byrne, P, 1943–1951, 1954–1957
- Marty Bystrom, P, 1984–1985

== C ==
- Jose Caballero, UT, 2025-Present
- César Cabral, P, 2013–2014
- Melky Cabrera, OF, 2005–2009
- Oswaldo Cabrera, IF/OF, 2022–present
- Greg Cadaret, P, 1989–1992
- Miguel Cairo, IF, 2004, 2006–2007
- Ray Caldwell, P, 1910–1918
- Charlie Caldwell, P, 1925
- Willie Calhoun, OF, 2023
- Johnny Callison, OF, 1972–1973
- Howie Camp, OF, 1917
- Bert Campaneris, IF, 1983
- Archie Campbell, P, 1928
- John Candelaria, P, 1988–1989
- Andy Cannizaro, IF, 2006
- Robinson Canó, IF, 2005–2013
- José Canseco, OF, 2000
- Mike Cantwell, P, 1916
- Chris Capuano, P, 2014–2015
- Andy Carey, IF, 1952–1960
- Buddy Carlyle, P, 2011
- Roy Carlyle, OF, 1926
- Duke Carmel, OF, 1965
- David Carpenter, P, 2015
- Matt Carpenter, INF/DH, 2022
- Carlos Carrasco, P, 2025
- Dick Carroll, P, 1909
- Ownie Carroll, P, 1930
- Tom Carroll, IF, 1955–1956
- Chris Carter, 1B/DH, 2017
- Chuck Cary, P, 1989–1991
- Hugh Casey, P, 1949
- Kevin Cash, C, 2009
- Alberto Castillo, C, 2002
- Roy Castleton, P, 1907
- Bill Castro, P, 1981
- Miguel Castro, P, 2022
- Starlin Castro, 2B, 2016–2017
- Danny Cater, IF, 1970–1971
- Rick Cerone, C, 1980–1984, 1987, 1990
- Bob Cerv, OF, 1951–1956, 1960–1962
- Francisco Cervelli, C, 2008–2014
- Luis Cessa, P, 2016–2021
- Shawn Chacón, P, 2005–2006
- Joba Chamberlain, P, 2007–2013
- Chris Chambliss, IF, 1974–1979, 1988
- **Frank Chance**, IF, 1913–1914
- Spud Chandler, P, 1937–1947
- Les Channell, OF, 1910–1914
- Darrin Chapin, P, 1991
- Aroldis Chapman, P, 2016, 2017–2022
- Ben Chapman, OF, 1930–1936
- Mike Chartak, OF, 1940–1942
- Hal Chase, IF, 1905–1913
- Eric Chavez, IF, 2011–2012
- **Jack Chesbro**, P, 1903–1909
- Jazz Chisholm Jr., CF/3B, 2024-present
- Randy Choate, P, 2000–2003
- Ji-Man Choi, 1B, 2017
- Justin Christian, OF, 2008
- Clay Christiansen, P, 1984
- Al Cicotte, P, 1957
- Anthony Claggett, P, 2009
- Preston Claiborne, P, 2013–2014
- Allie Clark, OF, 1947
- George Clark, P, 1913
- Jack Clark, OF, 1988
- Tony Clark, IF, 2004
- Horace Clarke, IF, 1965–1974
- Walter Clarkson, P, 1904–1907
- Brandon Claussen, P, 2003
- Ken Clay, P, 1977–1979
- Roger Clemens, P, 1999–2003, 2007
- Pat Clements, P, 1987–1988
- Tex Clevenger, P, 1961–1962
- Lou Clinton, OF, 1966–1967
- Tyler Clippard, P, 2007, 2016–2017
- Al Closter, P, 1971–1972
- Andy Coakley, P, 1911
- Jim Coates, P, 1956–1962
- Jim Cockman, IF, 1905
- Rich Coggins, OF, 1975–1976
- Phil Coke, P, 2008–2009, 2016
- Rocky Colavito, OF, 1968
- A. J. Cole, P, 2018
- Gerrit Cole, P, 2020–2024
- King Cole, P, 1914–1915
- Rip Coleman, P, 1955–1956
- Jerry Coleman, IF, 1949–1957
- Curt Coleman, IF, 1912
- Michael Coleman, OF, 2001
- Rip Collins, P, 1920–1921
- Pat Collins, C, 1926–1928
- Rip Collins, C, 1944
- Joe Collins, IF, 1948–1957
- Orth Collins, OF, 1904
- Dave Collins, OF, 1982
- Frank Colman, OF, 1946–1947
- Bartolo Colón, P, 2011
- Loyd Colson, P, 1970
- **Earle Combs**, OF, 1924–1935
- David Cone, P, 1995–2000
- Tom Connelly, OF, 1920–1921
- Joe Connor, C, 1905
- Wid Conroy, IF, 1903–1908
- José Contreras, P, 2003–2004
- Andy Cook, P, 1993
- Doc Cook, OF, 1913–1916
- Dusty Cooke, OF, 1930–1932
- Ron Coomer, IF, 2002
- Phil Cooney, IF, 1905
- Johnny Cooney, OF, 1944
- Guy Cooper, P, 1914
- Don Cooper, P, 1985
- Garrett Cooper, 1B, 2017
- Franchy Cordero, OF, 2023
- Jimmy Cordero, P, 2023
- Nestor Cortes Jr., P, 2019, 2021–2024
- Dan Costello, OF, 1913
- Caleb Cotham, P, 2015
- Henry Cotto, OF, 1985–1987
- Ensign Cottrell, P, 1915
- Clint Courtney, C, 1951
- Ernie Courtney, IF, 1902–1903
- Jake Cousins, P, 2024–present
- **Stan Coveleski**, P, 1928
- Billy Cowan, OF, 1969
- Joe Cowley, P, 1984–1985
- Casey Cox, P, 1972–1973
- **Bobby Cox***, IF, 1968–1969
- Birdie Cree, OF, 1908–1915
- Lou Criger, C, 1910
- Herb Crompton, C, 1945
- Jack Cronin, P, 1902
- Bubba Crosby, OF, 2004–2006
- Frankie Crosetti, IF, 1932–1948
- Fernando Cruz, P, 2025–present
- Iván Cruz, IF, 1997
- José Cruz, OF, 1988
- Luis Cruz, IF, 2013
- Jack Cullen, P, 1962–1966
- Roy Cullenbine, OF, 1942
- Nick Cullop, P, 1916–1917
- Nick Cullop, OF, 1926
- John Cumberland, P, 1968–1970
- Jim Curry, IF, 1911
- Fred Curtis, IF, 1905
- Chad Curtis, OF, 1997–1999
- Colin Curtis, OF, 2010

== D ==
- Babe Dahlgren, IF, 1937–1940
- Bud Daley, P, 1961–1964
- Matt Daley, P, 2013–2014
- Tom Daley, OF, 1914–1915
- Johnny Damon, OF, 2006–2009
- Bert Daniels, OF, 1910–1913
- Bob Davidson, P, 1989
- Kyle Davies, P, 2015
- Chili Davis, OF, 1998–1999
- George Davis, P, 1912
- Ike Davis, 1B, 2016
- JD Davis, 1B, 2024
- Jonathan Davis, OF, 2021
- Kiddo Davis, OF, 1926
- Lefty Davis, OF, 1903
- Ron Davis, P, 1978–1981
- Russ Davis, IF, 1993–1995
- Brian Dayett, OF, 1983–1984
- Enyel De Los Santos, P, 2024
- Yerry De Los Santos, P, 2025–present
- John Deering, P, 1903
- Jim Deidel, C, 1974
- Iván DeJesús, IF, 1986
- Frank Delahanty, OF, 1905–1906, 1908
- Wilson Delgado, IF, 2000
- Bobby Del Greco, OF, 1957–1958
- David Dellucci, OF, 2003
- Jim Delsing, OF, 1949–1950
- Joe DeMaestri, IF, 1960–1961
- Ray Demmitt, OF, 1909
- Rick Dempsey, C, 1973–1976
- Bucky Dent, IF, 1977–1982
- Jorge DePaula, P, 2003–2005
- José de Paula, P, 2015
- Claud Derrick, IF, 1913
- Russ Derry, OF, 1944–1945
- Matt DeSalvo, P, 2007
- Jim Deshaies, P, 1984
- Jimmie DeShong, P, 1934–1935
- Orestes Destrade, IF, 1987
- Charlie Devens, P, 1932–1934
- Al DeVormer, C, 1921–1922
- **Joe DiMaggio**, OF, 1936–1951
- Chris Dickerson, OF, 2011–2012
- **Bill Dickey**, C, 1928–1946
- Murry Dickson, P, 1958
- Pop Dillon, IF, 1902
- Kerry Dineen, OF, 1975–1976
- Craig Dingman, P, 2000
- Art Ditmar, P, 1957–1961
- Sonny Dixon, P, 1956
- Pat Dobson, P, 1973–1975
- Cozy Dolan, OF, 1911–1912
- Jasson Dominguez, OF, 2023–present
- Atley Donald, P, 1938–1945
- Josh Donaldson, 3B, 2022–2023
- Mike Donlin, OF, 1901
- Bill Donovan, P, 1915–1916
- Mike Donovan, IF, 1908
- Brian Dorsett, C, 1989–1990
- Octavio Dotel, P, 2006
- Richard Dotson, P, 1988–1989
- Patsy Dougherty, OF, 1904–1906
- Camilo Doval, P, 2025-Present
- John Dowd, IF, 1912
- Al Downing, P, 1961–1969
- Slow Joe Doyle, P, 1906–1910
- Jack Doyle, IF, 1905
- Brian Doyle, IF, 1978–1980
- Doug Drabek, P, 1986
- Bill Drescher, C, 1944–1946
- Stephen Drew, IF, 2014–2015
- Karl Drews, P, 1946–1948
- Lew Drill, C/IF, 1902
- Brandon Drury, IF, 2018
- Monk Dubiel, P, 1944–1945
- Joe Dugan, IF, 1922–1928
- Ryan Dull, P, 2019
- Mariano Duncan, IF, 1996–1997
- Shelley Duncan, OF, 2007–2009
- Jack Dunn, IF, 1901
- Mike Dunn, P, 2009
- Ryne Duren, P, 1958–1961
- **Leo Durocher***, IF, 1925–1929
- Cedric Durst, OF, 1927–1930

== E ==
- Mike Easler, OF, 1986–1987
- Rawly Eastwick, P, 1978
- J. C. Escarra, C/IF, 2025-Present
- Foster Edwards, P, 1930
- Doc Edwards, C, 1965
- Robert Eenhoorn, IF, 1994–1996
- Scott Effross, P, 2022, 2024–2025
- Dave Eiland, P, 1988–1991, 1995
- Darrell Einertson, P, 2000
- Kid Elberfeld, IF, 1903–1909
- Gene Elliott, OF, 1911
- Dock Ellis, P, 1976–1977
- Duke Ellis, OF, 2024
- John Ellis, IF, 1969–1972
- Jacoby Ellsbury, OF, 2014–2017
- Kevin Elster, IF, 1994–1995
- Red Embree, P, 1948
- Alan Embree, P, 2005
- Edwin Encarnacion, IF, 2019
- Clyde Engle, OF, 1909–1910
- Jack Enright, P, 1917
- Morgan Ensberg, IF, 2008
- Nathan Eovaldi, P, 2015–2016
- Cody Eppley, P, 2012–2013
- Todd Erdos, P, 1998–2000
- Roger Erickson, P, 1982–1983
- Scott Erickson, P, 2006
- Félix Escalona, IF, 2004–2005
- Juan Espino, C, 1982–1986
- Álvaro Espinoza, IF, 1988–1991
- Bobby Estalella, C, 2001
- Thairo Estrada, IF, 2019–2020
- Nick Etten, IF, 1943–1946
- Barry Evans, IF, 1982

== F ==
- Charlie Fallon, --, 1905
- Kyle Farnsworth, P, 2006–2008
- Steve Farr, P, 1991–1993
- Doc Farrell, IF, 1932–1933
- Sal Fasano, C, 2006
- Alex Ferguson, P, 1918–1921, 1925
- Caleb Ferguson, P, 2024
- Frank Fernández, C, 1967–1969
- Tony Fernández, IF, 1995
- Mike Ferraro, IF, 1966–1968
- Wes Ferrell, P, 1938–1939
- Tom Ferrick, P, 1950–1951
- Chick Fewster, IF, 1917–1922
- Cecil Fielder, IF, 1996–1997
- Mike Figga, C, 1997–1999
- Cole Figueroa IF, 2015
- Ed Figueroa, P, 1976–1980
- Pete Filson, P, 1987
- Happy Finneran, P, 1918
- Mike Fischlin, IF, 1986
- Brian Fisher, P, 1985–1986
- Gus Fisher, C, 1912
- Ray Fisher, P, 1910–1917
- Mike Fitzgerald, OF, 1911
- John Flaherty, C, 2003–2005
- Ramon Flores, OF, 2015
- Estevan Florial, OF, 2020–2023
- Tim Foli, IF, 1984
- Ray Fontenot, P, 1983–1984
- Barry Foote, C, 1981–1982
- Russ Ford, P, 1909–1913
- **Whitey Ford**, P, 1950–1967
- Ben Ford, P, 2000
- Mike Ford, IF, 2019–2021
- Frank Foreman, P, 1901–1902
- Tony Fossas, P, 1999
- Eddie Foster, IF, 1910
- Jack Fournier, IF, 1918
- Frank Foutz, IF, 1901
- Dustin Fowler, OF, 2017
- Andy Fox, IF, 1996–1997
- Jeff Francis, P, 2014
- Ray Francis, P, 1925
- Ben Francisco, OF, 2013
- Wayne Franklin, P, 2005
- Clint Frazier, OF, 2017–2021
- George Frazier, P, 1981–1983
- Todd Frazier, 3B, 2017
- Mark Freeman, P, 1959
- Ray French, IF, 1920
- Lonny Frey, IF, 1947–1948
- Max Fried, P, 2025–present
- Bob Friend, P, 1966
- John Frill, P, 1910
- Bill Fulton, P, 1987
- Dave Fultz, OF, 1903–1905
- Liz Funk, OF, 1929

== G ==
- John Gabler, P, 1959–1960
- Joe Gallagher, OF, 1939
- Mike Gallego, IF, 1992–1994
- Giovanny Gallegos, P, 2017–2018
- Joey Gallo, OF, 2021–2022
- Oscar Gamble, OF, 1976, 1979–1984
- Ben Gamel, OF, 2016
- John Ganzel, IF, 1903–1904
- Mike Garbark, C, 1944–1945
- Dámaso García, IF, 1978–1979
- Deivi García, P, 2020–2023
- Freddy García, P, 2011–2012
- Jaime García, P, 2017
- Karim García, OF, 2002–2003
- Rico Garcia, P, 2025
- Billy Gardner, IF, 1961–1962
- Brett Gardner, OF, 2008–2021
- Earle Gardner, IF, 1908–1912
- Rob Gardner, P, 1970–1972
- Steve Garrison, P, 2011
- Ned Garvin, P, 1904
- Milt Gaston, P, 1924
- Chad Gaudin, P, 2009, 2010
- Mike Gazella, IF, 1923–1928
- Cory Gearrin, P, 2019
- Joe Gedeon, IF, 1916–1917
- **Lou Gehrig**, IF, 1923–1939
- Bob Geren, C, 1988–1991
- Domingo Germán, P, 2017–2019, 2021–2023
- Al Gettel, P, 1945–1946
- Jason Giambi, IF, 2002–2008
- Joe Giard, P, 1927
- Jake Gibbs, C, 1962–1971
- Sam Gibson, P, 1930
- Dan Giese, P, 2008
- Paul Gibson, P, 1993–1994, 1996
- Luis Gil, P, 2021–2022, 2024–present
- Billy Gilbert, IF, 1902
- Frank Gilhooley, OF, 1913–1918
- Charles Gipson, OF, 2003
- Joe Girardi, C, 1996–1999
- Chris Gittens IF, 2021
- Fred Glade, P, 1908
- Frank Gleich, OF, 1919–1920
- Joe Glenn, C, 1932–1938
- Paul Goldschmidt, IF, 2025
- Greg Golson, OF, 2010–2011
- **Lefty Gomez**, P, 1930–1942
- Yoendrys Gómez, P, 2023
- Jesse Gonder, C, 1960–1961
- Alberto González, IF, 2007–2008, 2013
- Chi Chi González, P, 2022
- Fernando González, IF, 1974
- Marwin González, UTIL, 2022
- Pedro González, IF, 1963–1965
- Victor González, P, 2024
- Wilbur Good, OF, 1905
- Dwight Gooden, P, 1996–1997, 2000
- Art Goodwin, P, 1905
- Nick Goody, P, 2015–2016
- Brian Gordon, P, 2011
- Tom Gordon, P, 2004–2005
- **Joe Gordon**, IF, 1938–1946
- Tom Gorman, P, 1952–1954
- **Goose Gossage**, P, 1978–1983, 1989
- Dick Gossett, C, 1913–1914
- Larry Gowell, P, 1972
- Johnny Grabowski, C, 1927–1929
- Alex Graman, P, 2004–2005
- Curtis Granderson, OF, 2010–2013
- Wayne Granger, P, 1973
- Sonny Gray, P, 2017–2018
- Ted Gray, P, 1955
- Eli Grba, P, 1959–1960
- Chad Green, P, 2016–2022
- Nick Green, IF, 2006
- Shane Greene, P, 2014, 2022
- Todd Greene, C, 2001
- Paddy Greene, IF, 1903
- Didi Gregorius, SS, 2015–2019
- Ken Griffey Sr., OF, 1982–1986
- Mike Griffin, P, 1979–1981
- **Clark Griffith***, P, 1903–1907
- Bob Grim, P, 1954–1958
- **Burleigh Grimes**, P, 1934
- Oscar Grimes, IF, 1943–1946
- Jason Grimsley, P, 1999–2000
- Trent Grisham, OF, 2024–present
- Lee Grissom, P, 1940
- Buddy Groom, P, 2005
- Cecilio Guante, P, 1987–1988
- Lee Guetterman, P, 1988–1992
- Ron Guidry, P, 1975–1988
- Aaron Guiel, OF, 2006
- Brad Gulden, C, 1979–1980
- Don Gullett, P, 1977–1978
- Bill Gullickson, P, 1987
- Randy Gumpert, P, 1946–1948
- Larry Gura, P, 1974–1975
- Freddy Guzmán, OF, 2009
- Ronald Guzmán, IF, 2022

== H ==
- John Habyan, P, 1990–1993
- Bump Hadley, P, 1936–1940
- Kent Hadley, IF, 1960
- Travis Hafner, DH, 2013
- Noodles Hahn, P, 1906
- Ed Hahn, OF, 1905–1906
- Hinkey Haines, OF, 1923
- Jerry Hairston Jr. IF/OF, 2009
- George Halas, OF, 1919
- Bob Hale, IF, 1961
- Dad Hale, P, 1902
- David Hale, P, 2018, 2019–2020
- Jimmie Hall, OF, 1969
- Mel Hall, OF, 1989–1992
- Brad Halsey, P, 2004
- Roger Hambright, P, 1971
- Ian Hamilton, P, 2023–2025
- Steve Hamilton, P, 1963–1970
- Chris Hammond, P, 2003
- Mike Handiboe, OF, 1911
- Jim Hanley, P, 1913
- Truck Hannah, C, 1918–1920
- Ron Hansen, IF, 1970–1971
- Harry Hanson, C, 1913
- J. A. Happ, P, 2018–2020
- Jim Hardin, P, 1971
- Bubbles Hargrave, C, 1930
- Harry Harper, P, 1921
- Toby Harrah, IF, 1984
- Greg Harris, P, 1994
- Joe Harris, IF, 1914
- Jimmy Hart, IF, 1901
- Jim Ray Hart, IF, 1973–1974
- Geoff Hartlieb, P, 2025
- Roy Hartzell, OF, 1911–1916
- Joe Harvey, P, 2019
- Buddy Hassett, IF, 1942
- Ron Hassey, C, 1985–1986
- Andy Hawkins, P, 1989–1991
- LaTroy Hawkins, P, 2008
- Chicken Hawks, IF, 1921
- Charlie Hayes, IF, 1992, 1996–1997
- Chase Headley, 3B, 2014–2017
- Brent Headrick, P, 2025–present
- Fran Healy, C, 1976–1978
- Andrew Heaney, P, 2021
- Mike Heath, C, 1978
- Slade Heathcott, OF, 2015
- Neal Heaton, P, 1993
- Adeiny Hechavarria, IF, 2018
- Don Heffner, IF, 1934–1937
- Mike Hegan, IF, 1964–1967, 1973–1974
- Fred Heimach, P, 1928–1929
- Crese Heismann, P, 1902
- Woodie Held, IF, 1954, 1957
- Ben Heller, P, 2016–2017, 2019–2020
- Charlie Hemphill, OF, 1908–1911
- Rollie Hemsley, C, 1942–1944
- Bill Henderson, P, 1930
- **Rickey Henderson**, OF, 1984–1989
- Harvey Hendrick, IF, 1923–1924
- Ellie Hendricks, C, 1976–1977
- Tim Hendryx, OF, 1915–1917
- Sean Henn, P, 2005–2007
- Tommy Henrich, OF, 1937–1950
- Bill Henry, P, 1966
- Drew Henson, IF, 2002–2003
- Félix Heredia, P, 2003–2004
- Xavier Hernandez, P, 1994
- Orlando Hernández, P, 1998–2002, 2004
- Adrian Hernández, P, 2001–2002
- Michel Hernandez, C, 2003
- Leo Hernández, IF, 1986
- Ronald Herrera, P, 2017
- Ed Herrmann, C, 1975
- Aaron Hicks, OF, 2016–2023
- Kyle Higashioka, C, 2017–2023
- Hugh High, OF, 1915–1918
- Oral Hildebrand, P, 1939–1940
- Jesse Hill, OF, 1935
- Glenallen Hill, OF, 2000
- Rich Hill, P, 2014
- Tim Hill, P, 2024–present
- Shawn Hillegas, P, 1992
- Frank Hiller, P, 1946–1949
- Mack Hillis, IF, 1924
- Eric Hinske, OF, 2009
- Rich Hinton, P, 1972
- Sterling Hitchcock, P, 1992–1995, 2001–2003
- Myril Hoag, OF, 1931–1938
- Butch Hobson, IF, 1982
- Chet Hoff, P, 1911–1913
- Danny Hoffman, OF, 1906–1907
- Solly Hofman, OF, 1916
- Fred Hofmann, C, 1919–1925
- Bill Hogg, P, 1905–1908
- Bobby Hogue, P, 1951–1952
- Ken Holcombe, P, 1945
- Bill Holden, OF, 1913–1914
- Jonathan Holder, P, 2016–2020
- Al Holland, P, 1986–1987
- Matt Holliday, DH, 2017
- Ken Holloway, P, 1930
- Clay Holmes, P, 2021–2024
- Darren Holmes, P, 1998
- Fred Holmes, C, 1903
- Roger Holt, IF, 1980
- Ken Holtzman, P, 1976–1978
- Rick Honeycutt, P, 1995
- Wally Hood, P, 1949
- Don Hood, P, 1979
- Johnny Hopp, OF, 1950–1952
- Shags Horan, OF, 1924
- Ralph Houk, C, 1947–1954
- Elston Howard, C, 1955–1967
- Matt Howard, IF, 1996
- Steve Howe, P, 1991–1996
- Harry Howell, P, 1901–1903
- Jay Howell, P, 1982–1984
- Dick Howser, IF, 1967–1968
- **Waite Hoyt**, P, 1921–1930
- Rex Hudler, IF, 1984–1985
- David Huff, P, 2013, 2014
- Chad Huffman, OF, 2010
- Charles Hudson, P, 1987–1988
- Tom Hughes, P, 1902, 1904
- Tom L. Hughes, P, 1906–1910
- Phil Hughes, P, 2007–2013
- Keith Hughes, OF, 1987
- John Hummel, IF, 1918
- Mike Humphreys, OF, 1991–1993
- Ken Hunt, OF, 1959–1960
- **Catfish Hunter**, P, 1975–1979
- Billy Hunter, IF, 1955–1956
- Mark Hutton, P, 1993–1994, 1996
- Ham Hyatt, IF, 1918

== I ==
- Raúl Ibañez, OF, 2012
- Ryota Igarashi, P, 2012
- Kei Igawa, P, 2007–2008
- Pete Incaviglia, OF, 1997
- Hideki Irabu, P, 1997–1999
- Travis Ishikawa, IF, 2013

== J ==
- Fred Jacklitsch, C, 1905
- Grant Jackson, P, 1976
- Jim Jackson, OF, 1901
- **Reggie Jackson**, OF, 1977–1981
- Johnny James, P, 1958–1961
- Dion James, OF, 1992–1996
- Stan Javier, OF, 1984
- Domingo Jean, P, 1993
- Stan Jefferson, OF, 1989
- Jackie Jensen, OF, 1950–1952
- Mike Jerzembeck, P, 1998
- **Derek Jeter**, SS, 1995–2014
- D'Angelo Jiménez, IF, 1999
- Elvio Jiménez, OF, 1964
- Brett Jodie, P, 2001
- Tommy John, P, 1979–1982, 1986–1989
- Alex Johnson, OF, 1974–1975
- Billy Johnson, IF, 1943–1951
- Cliff Johnson, DH, 1977–1979
- Darrell Johnson, C, 1957–1958
- Deron Johnson, IF, 1960–1961
- Don Johnson, P, 1947–1950
- Ernie Johnson, IF, 1923–1925
- Hank Johnson, P, 1925–1932
- Jeff Johnson, P, 1991–1993
- Johnny Johnson, P, 1944
- Kelly Johnson, 2014
- Ken Johnson, P, 1969
- Lance Johnson, OF, 2000
- Nick Johnson, IF, 2001–2003, 2010
- Otis Johnson, IF, 1911
- **Randy Johnson**, P, 2005–2006
- Russ Johnson, IF, 2005
- Roy Johnson, OF, 1936–1937
- Jay Johnstone, OF, 1978–1979
- **Andruw Jones**, OF, 2011–2012
- Darryl Jones, DH, 1979
- Garrett Jones, OF, 2015
- Gary Jones, P, 1970–1971
- Jahmai Jones, IF, 2024
- Jimmy Jones, P, 1989–1990
- Ruppert Jones, OF, 1980
- Sad Sam Jones, P, 1922–1926
- Tom Jones, IF, 1902
- Slats Jordan, IF/OF, 1901–1902
- Tim Jordan, IF, 1903
- Arndt Jorgens, C, 1929–1939
- Félix José, OF, 2000
- Corban Joseph, IF, 2013
- Jeff Juden, P, 1999
- Aaron Judge, OF, 2016–present
- Mike Jurewicz, P, 1965
- David Justice, OF, 2000–2001

== K ==
- **Jim Kaat**, P, 1979–1980
- Tommy Kahnle, P, 2017–2020, 2023–2024
- Scott Kamieniecki, P, 1991–1996
- Bob Kammeyer, P, 1978–1979
- Frank Kane, OF, 1919
- Bill Karlon, OF, 1930
- Bill Karns, P, 1901
- Herb Karpel, P, 1946
- Steve Karsay, P, 2002, 2004–2005
- Jeff Karstens, P, 2006–2007
- Jack Katoll, P, 1902
- Benny Kauff, OF, 1912
- Curt Kaufman, P, 1982–1983
- Austin Kearns, OF, 2010
- Eddie Kearse, C, 1942
- Ray Keating, P, 1912–1918
- Bobby Keefe, P, 1907
- **Willie Keeler**, OF, 1903–1909
- Randy Keisler, P, 2000–2001
- Bill Keister, IF, 1901
- Mike Kekich, P, 1969–1973
- Charlie Keller, OF, 1939–1949, 1952
- **Joe Kelley**, OF, 1902
- Shawn Kelley, P, 2013–2014
- Pat Kelly, IF, 1991–1997
- Roberto Kelly, OF, 1987–1992, 2000
- Steve Kemp, OF, 1983–1984
- Ian Kennedy, P, 2007–2009
- John Kennedy, IF, 1967
- Jerry Kenney, IF, 1967–1972
- Matt Keough, P, 1983
- Jimmy Key, P, 1993–1996
- Steve Kiefer, IF, 1989
- Isiah Kiner-Falefa, SS, 2022–2023
- Mike King, P, 2019–2023
- Harry Kingman, IF, 1914
- Dave Kingman, OF, 1977
- Fred Kipp, P, 1960
- Frank Kitson, P, 1907
- Ron Kittle, OF, 1986–1987
- Ted Kleinhans, P, 1936
- Red Kleinow, C, 1904–1910
- Ed Klepfer, P, 1911–1913
- Ron Klimkowski, P, 1969–1970, 1972
- Steve Kline, P, 1970–1974
- Corey Kluber, P, 2021
- Mickey Klutts, IF, 1976–1978
- Bill Knickerbocker, IF, 1938–1940
- Brandon Knight, P, 2001–2002
- John Knight, IF, 1909–1911, 1913
- Chuck Knoblauch, IF, 1998–2001
- Mark Koenig, IF, 1925–1930
- Brody Koerner, P, 2021
- Jim Konstanty, P, 1954–1956
- George Kontos, P, 2011, 2018
- Andy Kosco, OF, 1968
- Pete Kozma, IF, 2017
- Steve Kraly, P, 1953
- Jack Kramer, P, 1951
- Erik Kratz, C, 2017, 2020
- Brooks Kriske, P, 2020–2021
- Matt Krook, P, 2023
- Ernie Krueger, C, 1915
- Dick Kryhoski, IF, 1949
- Tony Kubek, IF, 1957–1965
- Johnny Kucks, P, 1955–1959
- Bill Kunkel, P, 1963
- Hiroki Kuroda, P, 2012–2014
- Bob Kuzava, P, 1951–1954

== L ==
- Aaron Laffey, P, 2011
- Brandon Laird, IF, 2011
- Dave LaRoche, P, 1981–1983
- Brady Lail, P, 2019
- Joe Lake, P, 1908–1909
- Bill Lamar, OF, 1917–1919
- Ryan LaMarre, OF, 2021
- Hal Lanier, IF, 1972–1973
- Dave LaPoint, P, 1989–1990
- Frank LaPorte, IF, 1905–1910
- Don Larsen, P, 1955–1959
- Lyn Lary, IF, 1929–1934
- Chris Latham, OF, 2003
- Tacks Latimer, C, 1901
- Bob Lawson, P, 1902
- Marcus Lawton, OF, 1989
- Matt Lawton, OF, 2005
- Gene Layden, OF, 1915
- Tommy Layne, P, 2016–2017
- **Tony Lazzeri**, IF, 1926–1937
- Tim Leary, P, 1990–1992
- Wade LeBlanc, P, 2014
- Ricky Ledée, OF, 1998–2000
- Travis Lee, IF, 2004
- Joe Lefebvre, OF, 1980
- Al Leiter, P, 1987–1989, 2005–2006
- Mark Leiter, P, 1990
- Mark Leiter Jr., P, 2024–2025
- Frank Leja, IF, 1954–1955
- Jack Lelivelt, OF, 1912–1913
- DJ LeMahieu, IF, 2019–2025
- Eddie Leon, IF, 1975
- Louis Leroy, P, 1905–1906
- Chris Leroux, P, 2014
- Ed Levy, OF, 1942–1944
- Duffy Lewis, OF, 1919–1920
- Jim Lewis, P, 1982
- Terry Ley, P, 1971
- Jim Leyritz, C, 1990–1996, 1999–2000
- Cory Lidle, P, 2006
- Jon Lieber, P, 2004
- Brent Lillibridge, UT, 2013
- Ted Lilly, P, 2000–2002
- Paul Lindblad, P, 1978
- Johnny Lindell, OF, 1941–1950
- Jacob Lindgren, P, 2015
- Phil Linz, IF, 1962–1965
- Bryan Little, IF, 1986
- Jack Little, OF, 1912
- Clem Llewellyn, P, 1922
- Graeme Lloyd, P, 1996–1998
- Jonathan Loáisiga, P, 2018–2025
- Esteban Loaiza, P, 2004
- Tim Locastro, OF, 2021–2022
- Gene Locklear, OF, 1976–1977
- Kenny Lofton, OF, 2004
- Boone Logan, P, 2010–2013
- Tim Lollar, P, 1980
- Sherm Lollar, C, 1947–1948
- George Lombard Jr., SS, 2026-Present
- Phil Lombardi, C, 1986–1987
- Dale Long, IF, 1960, 1962–1963
- Herman Long, IF, 1903
- Terrence Long, OF, 2006
- Eddie Lopat, P, 1948–1955
- Art Lopez, OF, 1965
- Héctor López, OF, 1959–1966
- Baldy Louden, IF, 1907
- Slim Love, P, 1916–1918
- Torey Lovullo, IF, 1991
- Derek Lowe, P, 2012
- Mike Lowell, IF, 1998
- Johnny Lucadello, IF, 1947
- Joe Lucey, P, 1920
- Roy Luebbe, C, 1925
- Lucas Luetge, P, 2021–2022
- Matt Luke, OF, 1996
- Jerry Lumpe, IF, 1956–1959
- Scott Lusader, OF, 1991
- Sparky Lyle, P, 1972–1978
- Lance Lynn, P, 2018
- Al Lyons, P, 1944–1947
- Tyler Lyons, P, 2019–2020
- Jim Lyttle, OF, 1969–1971

== M ==
- Duke Maas, P, 1958–1961
- Kevin Maas, DH, 1990–1993
- Bob MacDonald, P, 1995
- Danny MacFayden, P, 1932–1934
- Josh Maciejewski, P, 2024
- Ray Mack, IF, 1947
- Tommy Madden, OF, 1910
- Elliott Maddox, OF, 1974–1976
- Dave Madison, P, 1950
- Lee Magee, OF, 1916–1917
- Sal Maglie, P, 1957–1958
- Stubby Magner, IF, 1911
- Jim Magnuson, P, 1973
- Fritz Maisel, IF, 1913–1917
- Hank Majeski, IF, 1946
- Frank Makosky, P, 1937
- Pat Malone, P, 1935–1937
- Pat Maloney, OF, 1912
- Al Mamaux, P, 1924
- Rube Manning, P, 1907–1910
- Joe Mantiply, P, 2019
- **Mickey Mantle**, OF, 1951–1968
- Jeff Manto, IF, 1999
- Josías Manzanillo, P, 1995
- Cliff Mapes, OF, 1948–1951
- Ron Marinaccio, P, 2022–2024
- Roger Maris, OF, 1960–1966
- Cliff Markle, P, 1915–1916, 1924
- Jeff Marquez, P, 2011
- Jim Marquis, P, 1925
- Armando Marsans, OF, 1917–1918
- Brett Marshall, P, 2013
- Cuddles Marshall, P, 1946–1949
- Sam Marsonek, P, 2004
- Dámaso Marte, P, 2008–2010
- Billy Martin, IF, 1950–1957
- Chris Martin, P, 2015
- Jack Martin, IF, 1912
- Hersh Martin, OF, 1944–1945
- Russell Martin, C, 2011–2012
- Tippy Martinez, P, 1974–1976
- Tino Martinez, IF, 1996–2001, 2005
- Jim Mason, IF, 1974–1976
- Víctor Mata, OF, 1984–1985
- Jimmy Mathison, IF, 1902
- Hideki Matsui, OF, 2003–2009
- Don Mattingly, IF, 1982–1995
- Tyler Matzek, P, 2025
- Rudy May, P, 1974–1976, 1980–1983
- Darrell May, P, 2005
- Carlos May, OF, 1976–1977
- John Mayberry, IF, 1982
- Cameron Maybin, OF, 2019
- Carl Mays, P, 1919–1923
- Tim Mayza, P, 2024
- Lee Mazzilli, OF, 1982
- Sport McAllister, IF, 1902
- Zach McAllister, P, 2023
- Larry McCall, P, 1977–1978
- Brian McCann, C, 2014–2016
- Brandon McCarthy, P, 2014
- Joe McCarthy, C, 1905
- Pat McCauley, C, 1903
- Larry McClure, OF, 1910
- George McConnell, P, 1909–1913
- Mike McCormick, P, 1970
- Lance McCullers, P, 1989–1990
- Andrew McCutchen, OF, 2018
- Lindy McDaniel, P, 1968–1973
- Mickey McDermott, P, 1956
- Danny McDevitt, P, 1961
- Jim McDonald, P, 1952–1954
- Darnell McDonald, OF, 2012
- Dave McDonald, IF, 1969
- Donzell McDonald, OF, 2001
- Gil McDougald, IF, 1951–1960
- Sam McDowell, P, 1973–1974
- Jack McDowell, P, 1995
- Lou McEvoy, P, 1930–1931
- Herm McFarland, OF, 1902–1903
- Andy McGaffigan, P, 1981
- Dan McGann, IF, 1902
- Casey McGehee, IF, 2012
- **Joe McGinnity**, P, 1901–1902
- Lynn McGlothen, P, 1982
- Bob McGraw, P, 1917–1920
- **John McGraw***, IF, 1901–1902
- Deacon McGuire, C, 1904–1907
- Marty McHale, P, 1913–1915
- Irish McIlveen, OF, 1908–1909
- Tim McIntosh, C, 1996
- David McKay, P, 2022
- **Bill McKechnie***, IF, 1913
- Billy McKinney, OF, 2018, 2023
- Rich McKinney, IF, 1972
- Ryan McMahon, 3B, 2025-Present
- Frank McManus, C, 1904
- Norm McMillan, IF, 1922
- Tommy McMillan, IF, 1912
- Mike McNally, IF, 1921–1924
- Herb McQuaid, P, 1926
- George McQuinn, IF, 1947–1948
- Bobby Meacham, IF, 1983–1988
- Charlie Meara, OF, 1914
- Jim Mecir, P, 1996–1997
- Doc Medich, P, 1972–1975
- Mark Melancon, P, 2009–2010
- Bill Mellor, IF, 1902
- Bob Melvin, C, 1994
- Ramiro Mendoza, P, 1996–2002, 2005
- Jordy Mercer, IF, 2020
- Fred Merkle, IF, 1925–1926
- Melky Mesa, OF, 2012–2013
- Andy Messersmith, P, 1978
- Tom Metcalf, P, 1963
- Bud Metheny, OF, 1943–1946
- Hensley Meulens, OF, 1989–1993
- Bob Meusel, OF, 1920–1929
- Bob Meyer, P, 1964
- Dan Miceli, P, 2003
- Gene Michael, IF, 1968–1974
- Keynan Middleton, P 2023
- Ezra Midkiff, IF, 1912–1913
- Doug Mientkiewicz, IF, 2007
- Pete Mikkelsen, P, 1964–1965
- Larry Milbourne, IF, 1981–1983
- Sam Militello, P, 1992–1993
- Andrew Miller, P, 2015–2016
- Bill Miller, P, 1952–1954
- Elmer Miller, OF, 1915–1922
- Jim Miller, P, 2013–2014
- John Miller, OF, 1966
- Alan Mills, P, 1990–1991
- Buster Mills, OF, 1940
- Mike Milosevich, IF, 1944–1945
- Paul Mirabella, P, 1979
- Juan Miranda, IF, 2008–2010
- Willy Miranda, IF, 1953–1954
- Anthony Misiewicz, P, 2023
- Bobby Mitchell, OF, 1970
- Bryan Mitchell, P, 2014–2017
- D. J. Mitchell, P, 2012
- Fred Mitchell, P, 1910
- Johnny Mitchell, IF, 1921–1922
- Sergio Mitre, P, 2009–2011
- **Johnny Mize**, IF, 1949–1953
- Kevin Mmahat, P, 1989
- Chad Moeller, C, 2008, 2010
- George Mogridge, P, 1915–1920
- Dale Mohorcic, P, 1988–1989
- Fenton Mole, IF, 1949
- Gustavo Molina, C, 2011
- José Molina, C, 2007–2009
- Bill Monbouquette, P, 1967–1968
- Raúl Mondesí, OF, 2002–2003
- Ed Monroe, P, 1917–1918
- Zach Monroe, P, 1958–1959
- Frankie Montas, P, 2022–2023
- John Montefusco, P, 1983–1986
- Rich Monteleone, P, 1990–1993
- Jesús Montero, C, 2011
- Jordan Montgomery, P, 2017–2022
- Archie Moore, OF, 1964–1965
- Earl Moore, P, 1907
- Wilcy Moore, P, 1927–1929, 1932–1933
- Kendrys Morales, IF, 2019
- Ray Morehart, IF, 1927
- Diego Moreno, P, 2015
- Omar Moreno, OF, 1983–1985
- Mike Morgan, P, 1982
- Tom Morgan, P, 1951–1956
- George Moriarty, IF, 1906–1908
- Jeff Moronko, IF, 1987
- Hal Morris, IF, 1988–1989
- Ross Moschitto, OF, 1965–1967
- Jerry Moses, C, 1973
- Dustin Moseley, P, 2010
- Terry Mulholland, P, 1994
- Conor Mullee, P, 2016
- Charlie Mullen, IF, 1914–1916
- Jerry Mumphrey, OF, 1981–1983
- Bob Muncrief, P, 1951
- Bobby Muñoz, P, 1993–1994
- Thurman Munson, C, 1969–1979
- Bobby Murcer, OF, 1965–1974, 1979–1983
- John Ryan Murphy, C, 2013–2015
- Johnny Murphy, P, 1932–1946
- Rob Murphy, P, 1994
- Dale Murray, P, 1983–1985
- George Murray, P, 1922
- Larry Murray, OF, 1974–1976
- **Mike Mussina**, P, 2001–2008
- Mike Myers, P, 2006–2007

== N ==
- Xavier Nady, OF, 2008–2009
- Jerry Narron, C, 1979
- Carlos Narvaez, C, 2024
- Dan Naulty, P, 1999
- Dioner Navarro, C, 2004
- Denny Neagle, P, 2000
- Thomas Neal, OF, 2013
- Bots Nekola, P, 1929
- Chris Nelson, IF, 2013
- Gene Nelson, P, 1981
- Jeff Nelson, P, 1996–2000, 2003
- Luke Nelson, P, 1919
- Nick Nelson, P, 2020–2021
- Graig Nettles, IF, 1973–1983
- Tacks Neuer, P, 1907
- Ernie Nevel, P, 1950–1951
- Floyd Newkirk, P, 1934
- Bobo Newsom, P, 1947
- Doc Newton, P, 1905–1909
- Gus Niarhos, C, 1946–1950
- **Phil Niekro**, P, 1984–1985
- Joe Niekro, P, 1985–1987
- Scott Nielsen, P, 1986, 1988–1989
- Jerry Nielsen, P, 1992
- Wil Nieves, C, 2005–2007
- Harry Niles, OF, 1908
- C. J. Nitkowski, P, 2004
- Jayson Nix, UT, 2012–2013
- Otis Nixon, OF, 1983
- Rico Noel, OF, 2015
- Héctor Noesí, P, 2011
- Jerry Nops, P, 1901
- Matt Nokes, C, 1990–1994
- Irv Noren, OF, 1952–1956
- Don Nottebart, P, 1969
- Iván Nova, P, 2010–2016
- Les Nunamaker, C, 1914–1917
- Eduardo Núñez, IF, 2010–2013
- Vidal Nuño, P, 2013–2014

== O ==
- Mike O'Berry, C, 1984
- Andy O'Connor, P, 1908
- Jack O'Connor, C, 1903
- Paddy O'Connor, C, 1918
- Darren O'Day, P, 2021
- Lefty O'Doul, OF, 1919–1922
- Steve O'Neill, C, 1925
- Paul O'Neill, OF, 1993–2001
- Jimmy O'Rourke, OF, 1908
- Johnny Oates, C, 1980–1981
- Heinie Odom, IF, 1925
- Rougned Odor, IF, 2021
- Rowland Office, OF, 1983
- Ross Ohlendorf, P, 2007–2008
- Bob Ojeda, P, 1994
- Rube Oldring, OF, 1905, 1916
- John Olerud, IF, 2004
- Bob Oliver, IF, 1975
- Joe Oliver, C, 2001
- Nate Oliver, IF, 1969
- Tyler Olson, P, 2016
- Jesse Orosco, P, 2003
- Al Orth, P, 1904–1909
- Donovan Osborne, P, 2004
- Champ Osteen, IF, 1904
- Joe Ostrowski, P, 1950–1952
- Antonio Osuna, P, 2003
- Bill Otis, OF, 1912
- Adam Ottavino, P, 2019–2020, 2025
- Josh Outman, P, 2014
- Lyle Overbay, IF, 2013
- Stubby Overmire, P, 1951
- Spike Owen, IF, 1993
- Andy Oyler, IF, 1902

== P ==
- John Pacella, P, 1982
- Del Paddock, IF, 1912
- Juan Padilla, P, 2004
- Dave Pagan, P, 1973–1976
- Joe Page, P, 1944–1950
- Mike Pagliarulo, IF, 1984–1989
- Donn Pall, P, 1994
- Chan Ho Park, P, 2010
- Hoy Park, OF, 2021
- Blake Parker, P, 2016
- Clay Parker, P, 1989–1990
- Christian Parker, P, 2001
- Chris Parmelee, 1B, 2016
- Ben Paschal, OF, 1924–1929
- Dan Pasqua, OF, 1985–1987
- Gil Patterson, P, 1977
- Jeff Patterson, P, 1995
- Mike Patterson, OF, 1981–1982
- Scott Patterson, P, 2008
- Carl Pavano, P, 2005, 2007–2008
- Dave Pavlas, P, 1995–1996
- James Paxton, P, 2019–2020
- James Pazos, P, 2015–2016
- Steve Pearce, IF, 2012
- Monte Pearson, P, 1936–1940
- Roger Peckinpaugh, IF, 1913–1921
- Steve Peek, P, 1941
- Hipólito Peña, P, 1988
- Ramiro Peña, IF, 2009–2012
- Lance Pendleton, P, 2011
- **Herb Pennock**, P, 1923–1933
- Joe Pepitone, IF, 1962–1969
- Wandy Peralta, P, 2021–2023
- Oswald Peraza, IF, 2022–2023
- Everson Pereira, OF, 2023
- Eury Pérez, OF, 2014
- Marty Perez, IF, 1977
- Mélido Pérez, P, 1992–1995
- Pascual Pérez, P, 1990–1991
- Robert Pérez, OF, 2001
- Cecil Perkins, P, 1967
- Cy Perkins, C, 1931
- **Gaylord Perry**, P, 1980
- Fritz Peterson, P, 1966–1974
- Jace Peterson, OF, 2018
- Gregorio Petit, P, 2015
- Andy Pettitte, P, 1995–2003, 2007–2010, 2012–2013
- David Phelps, P, 2012–2014
- Ken Phelps, DH, 1988–1989
- Josh Phelps, DH, 2007
- Andy Phillips, IF, 2004–2007
- Eddie Phillips, C, 1932
- Jack Phillips, IF, 1947–1949
- Cy Pieh, P, 1913–1915
- Bill Piercy, P, 1917–1921
- Duane Pillette, P, 1949–1950
- Branden Pinder, P, 2015–2016
- Michael Pineda, P, 2014–2017
- Lou Piniella, OF, 1974–1984
- George Pipgras, P, 1923–1933
- Wally Pipp, IF, 1915–1925
- José Pirela, IF, 2014–2015
- Jim Pisoni, OF, 1959–1960
- Eric Plunk, P, 1989–1991
- Dale Polley, P, 1996
- Luis Polonia, OF, 1989–1990, 1993–1995, 2000
- Sidney Ponson, P, 2006, 2008
- Bob Porterfield, P, 1948–1951
- Jorge Posada, C, 1995–2011
- Scott Pose, OF, 1997
- Cody Poteet, P, 2024
- Jack Powell, P, 1904–1905
- Jake Powell, OF, 1936–1940
- Doc Powers, C, 1905
- Martín Prado, UT, 2014
- Del Pratt, IF, 1918–1920
- George Prentiss, P, 1902
- Jerry Priddy, IF, 1941–1942
- Curtis Pride, OF, 2003
- Johnny Priest, IF, 1911–1912
- Bret Prinz, P, 2003–2004
- Scott Proctor, P, 2004–2007, 2011
- Alfonso Pulido, P, 1986
- Ambrose Puttmann, P, 1903–1905

== Q ==
- Chad Qualls, P, 2012
- Paul Quantrill, P, 2004–2005
- Mel Queen Sr., P, 1942–1947
- Eddie Quick, P, 1903
- Jack Quinn, P, 1909–1912, 1919–1921
- Jamie Quirk, C, 1989

== R ==
- **Tim Raines**, OF, 1995–1998
- Dave Rajsich, P, 1978
- Edwar Ramírez, P, 2007–2009
- José Ramírez, P, 2014
- Nick Ramirez, P, 2023
- Pedro Ramos, P, 1964–1966
- Bobby Ramos, C, 1982
- John Ramos, C, 1991
- Domingo Ramos, IF, 1978
- Lenny Randle, IF, 1979
- Willie Randolph, IF, 1976–1988
- Cody Ransom, IF, 2008–2009
- Clay Rapada, P, 2012
- Vic Raschi, P, 1946–1953
- Dennis Rasmussen, P, 1984–1987
- Darrell Rasner, P, 2006–2008
- Shane Rawley, P, 1982–1984
- Jeff Reardon, P, 1994
- Tim Redding, P, 2005
- Jack Reed, OF, 1961–1963
- Jimmie Reese, IF, 1930–1931
- Kevin Reese, OF, 2005–2006
- Rob Refsnyder, IF, 2015–2017
- Hal Reniff, P, 1961–1967
- Bill Renna, OF, 1953
- Tony Rensa, C, 1933
- Roger Repoz, OF, 1964–1966
- Rick Reuschel, P, 1981
- Dave Revering, IF, 1981–1982
- Al Reyes, P, 2003
- Pablo Reyes, IF/OF, 2025
- Allie Reynolds, P, 1947–1954
- Bill Reynolds, C, 1913–1914
- Mark Reynolds, IF, 2013
- Rick Rhoden, P, 1987–1988
- Gordon Rhodes, P, 1929–1932
- Ben Rice, 1B, 2024–present
- Harry Rice, OF, 1930
- Antoan Richardson, OF, 2014
- Bobby Richardson, IF, 1955–1966
- Nolen Richardson, IF, 1935
- **Branch Rickey***, C, 1907
- Stephen Ridings, P, 2021
- Dave Righetti, P, 1979–1990
- José Rijo, P, 1984
- Royce Ring, P, 2010
- Danny Rios, P, 1997
- Juan Rivera, OF, 2001–2003
- **Mariano Rivera**, P, 1995–2013
- Rubén Rivera, OF, 1995–1996
- Mickey Rivers, OF, 1976–1979
- Anthony Rizzo, IF, 2021–2024
- **Phil Rizzuto**, IF, 1941–1956
- Roxey Roach, IF, 1910–1911
- Brian Roberts, 2B, 2014
- Dale Roberts, P, 1967
- David Robertson, P, 2008–2014, 2017–2018
- Gene Robertson, IF, 1928–1929
- Andre Robertson, IF, 1981–1985
- Aaron Robinson, C, 1943–1947
- Bill Robinson, OF, 1967–1969
- Bruce Robinson, C, 1979–1980
- Eddie Robinson, IF, 1954–1956
- Hank Robinson, P, 1918
- Jeff Robinson, P, 1990
- Shane Robinson, OF, 2018
- **Wilbert Robinson**, C, 1901–1902
- Carlos Rodón, P, 2023–present
- Alex Rodriguez, IF, 2004–2013, 2015–2016
- Aurelio Rodríguez, IF, 1980–1981
- Carlos Rodríguez, IF, 1991
- Edwin Rodríguez, IF, 1982
- Ellie Rodríguez, C, 1968
- Elmer Rodríguez, P, 2026-Present
- Felix Rodríguez, P, 2005
- Henry Rodríguez, OF, 2001
- **Iván Rodríguez**, C, 2008
- Joely Rodríguez, P, 2021
- Chaz Roe, P, 2014
- Gary Roenicke, OF, 1986
- Oscar Roettger, IF, 1923–1924
- Esmil Rogers, P, 2014–2015
- Tom Rogers, P, 1921
- Kenny Rogers, P, 1996–1997
- Jay Rogers, C, 1914
- George Rohe, IF, 1901
- Jim Roland, P, 1972
- Red Rolfe, IF, 1931–1942
- Sal Romano, P, 2021
- Austin Romine, C, 2011, 2013–2019
- Ben Rortvedt, C, 2023
- Adonis Rosa, P, 2019
- Buddy Rosar, C, 1939–1942
- Amed Rosario, UT, 2025–present
- Larry Rosenthal, OF, 1944
- Steve Roser, P, 1944–1946
- Ernie Ross, P, 1902
- Braggo Roth, OF, 1921
- Jerry Royster, IF, 1987
- Muddy Ruel, C, 1917–1920
- Dutch Ruether, P, 1926–1927
- **Red Ruffing**, P, 1930–1946
- Nick Rumbelow, P, 2015
- Allen Russell, P, 1915–1919
- Kevin Russo, IF/OF, 2010
- Marius Russo, P, 1939–1946
- **Babe Ruth**, OF, 1920–1934
- Brendan Ryan, IF, 2013–2015
- Rosy Ryan, P, 1928
- Blondy Ryan, IF, 1935

== S ==
- **CC Sabathia**, P, 2009–2019
- Johnny Sain, P, 1951–1955
- Lenn Sakata, IF, 1987
- Mark Salas, C, 1987
- Jack Saltzgaver, IF, 1932–1937
- Billy Sample, OF, 1985
- Celerino Sánchez, IF, 1972–1973
- Gary Sánchez, C, 2015–2021
- Humberto Sánchez, P, 2008
- Rey Sánchez, IF, 1997, 2005
- Rómulo Sánchez, P, 2010
- Roy Sanders, P, 1918
- Deion Sanders, OF, 1989–1990
- Scott Sanderson, P, 1991–1992
- Jayvien Sandridge, P, 2025-Present
- Charlie Sands, DH, 1967
- Fred Sanford, P, 1949–1951
- Amauri Sanit, P, 2011
- Dennis Santana, P, 2024
- Rafael Santana, IF, 1988
- Sergio Santos, P, 2015
- Bronson Sardinha, OF, 2007
- Don Savage, IF, 1944–1945
- Rick Sawyer, P, 1974–1975
- Steve Sax, IF, 1989–1991
- Ray Scarborough, P, 1952–1953
- Germany Schaefer, IF, 1916
- Harry Schaeffer, P, 1952
- Roy Schalk, IF, 1932
- Art Schallock, P, 1951–1955
- Wally Schang, C, 1921–1925
- Cam Schlittler, P, 2025-Present
- Bob Schmidt, C, 1965
- Butch Schmidt, IF, 1909
- Clarke Schmidt, P, 2020–present
- Crazy Schmit, P, 1901
- Johnny Schmitz, P, 1952–1953
- Pete Schneider, P, 1919
- Dick "Ducky" Schofield, IF, 1966
- Paul Schreiber, P, 1945
- Art Schult, IF, 1953
- Al Schulz, P, 1912–1914
- Don Schulze, P, 1989
- Pius Schwert, C, 1914–1915
- Everett Scott, IF, 1922–1925
- George Scott, IF, 1979
- Rodney Scott, IF, 1982
- Rod Scurry, P, 1985–1986
- Scott Seabol, IF, 2001
- JP Sears, P, 2022
- Ken Sears, C, 1943
- Bob Seeds, OF, 1936
- Kal Segrist, IF, 1952
- Fernando Seguignol, IF, 2003
- Kip Selbach, OF, 1902
- George Selkirk, OF, 1934–1942
- Ted Sepkowski, IF, 1947
- Hank Severeid, C, 1926
- Luis Severino, P, 2015–2019, 2021–2023
- **Joe Sewell**, IF, 1931–1933
- Richie Sexson, IF, 2008
- Cy Seymour, OF, 1901–1902
- Howie Shanks, OF, 1925
- Bobby Shantz, P, 1957–1960
- Billy Shantz, C, 1960
- Bob Shawkey, P, 1915–1927
- Spec Shea, P, 1947–1951
- Al Shealy, P, 1928
- George Shears, P, 1912
- Jimmy Sheckard, OF, 1902
- Tom Sheehan, P, 1921
- Gary Sheffield, OF, 2004–2006
- Justus Sheffield, P, 2018
- Rollie Sheldon, P, 1961–1965
- Skeeter Shelton, OF, 1915
- Roy Sherid, P, 1929–1931
- Pat Sheridan, OF, 1991
- Dennis Sherrill, IF, 1978–1980
- Ben Shields, P, 1924–1925
- Charlie Shields, P, 1902
- Steve Shields, P, 1988
- Bob Shirley, P, 1983–1987
- Urban Shocker, P, 1916–1917, 1925–1928
- Tom Shopay, OF, 1967–1969
- Ernie Shore, P, 1919–1920
- Bill Short, P, 1960
- Chasen Shreve, P, 2015–2018
- Norm Siebern, IF, 1956–1959
- Rubén Sierra, OF, 1995–1996, 2003–2005
- Charlie Silvera, C, 1948–1956
- Ken Silvestri, C, 1941–1947
- Dave Silvestri, IF, 1992–1995
- Hack Simmons, IF, 1912
- Harry Simpson, OF, 1957–1958
- Dick Simpson, OF, 1969
- Duke Sims, C, 1973–1974
- Scott Sizemore, IF, 2014
- Bill Skiff, C, 1926
- Joel Skinner, C, 1986–1988
- Camp Skinner, OF, 1922
- Lou Skizas, OF, 1956
- Bill "Moose" Skowron, IF, 1954–1962
- Roger Slagle, P, 1979
- Austin Slater, OF, 2025
- Don Slaught, C, 1988–1989
- **Enos Slaughter**, OF, 1954–1959
- Aaron Small, P, 2005–2006
- Roy Smalley, IF, 1982–1984
- Walt Smallwood, P, 1917–1919
- Aleck Smith, C, 1902
- Caleb Smith, P, 2017
- Charley Smith, IF, 1967–1968
- Elmer Smith, OF, 1922–1923
- Joe Smith, C, 1913
- Keith Smith, IF, 1984–1985
- Kevin Smith, DH, 2024
- Klondike Smith, OF, 1912
- **Lee Smith**, P, 1993
- Matt Smith, P, 2006
- Harry Smythe, P, 1934
- Chappie Snodgrass, OF, 1901
- J. T. Snow, IF, 1992
- Eric Soderholm, IF, 1980
- Luis Sojo, IF, 1996–2001, 2003
- Tony Solaita, IF, 1968
- Donovan Solano, IF, 2016
- Yangervis Solarte, IF, 2014
- Alfonso Soriano, IF, 1999–2003, 2013–2014
- Rafael Soriano, P, 2011–2012
- Juan Soto, OF, 2024
- Steve Souchock, OF, 1946–1948
- Jim Spencer, IF, 1978–1981
- Shane Spencer, OF, 1998–2002
- Charlie Spikes, OF, 1972
- Russ Springer, P, 1992
- Bill Stafford, P, 1960–1965
- Jake Stahl, IF, 1908
- Roy Staiger, IF, 1979
- Tuck Stainback, OF, 1942–1945
- Gerry Staley, P, 1955–1956
- Charley Stanceu, P, 1941–1946
- Andy Stankiewicz, IF, 1992–1993
- Mike Stanley, C, 1992–1995, 1997
- Fred Stanley, IF, 1973–1980
- Giancarlo Stanton, OF/DH, 2018–present
- Mike Stanton, P, 1997–2002, 2005
- Dick Starr, P, 1947–1948
- Dave Stegman, OF, 1982
- Dutch Sterrett, OF, 1912–1913
- Bud Stewart, OF, 1948
- Chris Stewart, C, 2008, 2012–2013
- Lee Stine, P, 1938
- Kelly Stinnett, C, 2006
- Snuffy Stirnweiss, IF, 1943–1950
- Tim Stoddard, P, 1986–1988
- Mel Stottlemyre, P, 1964–1974
- Hal Stowe, P, 1960
- Darryl Strawberry, OF, 1995–1999
- Gabby Street, C, 1912
- Marcus Stroman, P, 2024–2025
- Marlin Stuart, P, 1954
- Bill Stumpf, IF, 1912–1913
- Tom Sturdivant, P, 1955–1959
- Johnny Sturm, IF, 1941
- Tanyon Sturtze, P, 2004–2006
- Bill Sudakis, IF, 1974
- Steve Sundra, P, 1936–1940
- **Ichiro Suzuki**, OF, 2012–2014
- Dale Sveum, IF, 1998
- Anthony Swarzak, P, 2016
- Ed Sweeney, C, 1908–1915
- Nick Swisher, OF, 2009–2012
- Ron Swoboda, OF, 1971–1973

== T ==
- Jameson Taillon, P, 2021–2022
- Fred Talbot, P, 1966–1969
- Vito Tamulis, P, 1934–1935
- Frank Tanana, P, 1993
- Masahiro Tanaka, P, 2014–2020
- Jesse Tannehill, P, 1903
- Tony Tarasco, OF, 1999
- Danny Tartabull, OF, 1992–1995
- Stephen Tarpley, P, 2018–2019
- Mike Tauchman, OF, 2019–2021
- Wade Taylor, P, 1991
- Zack Taylor, C, 1934
- Mark Teixeira, IF, 2009–2016
- Frank Tepedino, IF, 1967–1972
- Walt Terrell, P, 1989
- Ralph Terry, P, 1956–1957, 1959–1964
- Jay Tessmer, P, 1998–2000, 2002
- Dick Tettelbach, OF, 1955
- Bob Tewksbury, P, 1986–1987
- Marcus Thames, OF, 2002, 2010
- Ira Thomas, C, 1906–1907
- Justin Thomas, P, 2012
- Lee Thomas, OF, 1961
- Myles Thomas, P, 1926–1929
- Stan Thomas, P, 1977
- Gary Thomasson, OF, 1978
- Homer Thompson, C, 1912
- Kevin Thompson, OF, 2006–2007
- Ryan Thompson, OF, 2000
- Tommy Thompson, P, 1912
- Jack Thoney, OF, 1902, 1904
- Hank Thormahlen, P, 1917–1920
- Matt Thornton, P, 2014
- Marv Throneberry, IF, 1955–1959
- Mike Thurman, P, 2002
- Luis Tiant, P, 1979–1980
- Dick Tidrow, P, 1974–1979
- Bobby Tiefenauer, P, 1965
- Eddie Tiemeyer, IF, 1909
- Ray Tift, P, 1907
- Bob Tillman, C, 1967
- Thad Tillotson, P, 1967–1968
- Dan Tipple, P, 1915
- Wayne Tolleson, IF, 1986–1990
- Brett Tomko, P, 2009
- Michael Tonkin, P, 2024
- Earl Torgeson, IF, 1961
- Gleyber Torres, IF, 2018–2024
- Rusty Torres, OF, 1971–1972
- Ronald Torreyes, IF, 2016–2018
- Mike Torrez, P, 1977
- César Tovar, OF, 1976
- Josh Towers, P, 2009
- Billy Traber, P, 2008
- Matt Tracy, P, 2015
- Bubba Trammell, OF, 2003
- Taylor Trammell, OF, 2024
- Tom Tresh, OF, 1961–1969
- Jose Trevino, C, 2022–2024
- Gus Triandos, C, 1953–1954
- Lou Trivino, P, 2022–2023
- Steve Trout, P, 1987
- Virgil Trucks, P, 1958
- Frank Truesdale, IF, 1914
- Troy Tulowitzki, IF, 2019
- Bob Turley, P, 1955–1962
- Jim Turner, P, 1942–1945
- Chris Turner, C, 2000

== U ==
- George Uhle, P, 1933–1934
- Tom Underwood, P, 1980–1981
- Bob Unglaub, IF, 1904
- Cecil Upshaw, P, 1974
- Gio Urshela, IF, 2019–2021

== V ==
- Raúl Valdés, P, 2011
- Breyvic Valera, IF, 2019
- Elmer Valo, OF, 1960
- Russ Van Atta, P, 1933–1935
- **Dazzy Vance**, P, 1915, 1918
- Joe Vance, P, 1937–1938
- John Vander Wal, OF, 2002
- Randy Vásquez, P, 2023
- Hippo Vaughn, P, 1908–1912
- Bobby Vaughn, IF, 1909
- Javier Vázquez, P, 2004, 2010
- Bobby Veach, OF, 1925
- Randy Velarde, IF, 1987–1995, 2001
- Andrew Velazquez, IF, 2021
- Otto Vélez, OF, 1973–1976
- Mike Vento, OF, 2005
- Robin Ventura, IF, 2002–2003
- José Veras, P, 2006–2009
- Joe Verbanic, P, 1967–1970
- Frank Verdi, IF, 1953
- Alex Verdugo, OF, 2024
- Sammy Vick, OF, 1917–1920
- Ron Villone, P, 2006–2007
- Jorbit Vivas, 2B, 2025-Present
- José Vizcaíno, IF, 2000
- Luis Vizcaíno, P, 2007
- Luke Voit, IF, 2018–2021
- Anthony Volpe, IF, 2023–present

== W ==
- Cory Wade, P, 2011–2012
- Jake Wade, P, 1946
- Tyler Wade, IF, 2017–2021
- Dick Wakefield, OF, 1950
- Jim Walewander, IF, 1990
- Curt Walker, OF, 1919
- Dixie Walker, OF, 1931–1936
- Neil Walker, IF, 2018
- Mike Wallace, P, 1974–1975
- Joe Walsh, C, 1910–1911
- Jimmy Walsh, OF, 1914
- Roxy Walters, C, 1915–1918
- Danny Walton, OF, 1971
- **Paul Waner**, OF, 1944–1945
- Chien-Ming Wang, P, 2005–2009
- Jack Wanner, IF, 1909
- Pee-Wee Wanninger, IF, 1925
- Aaron Ward, IF, 1917–1926
- Gary Ward, OF, 1987–1989
- Joe Ward, IF, 1909
- Pete Ward, IF, 1970
- Jack Warhop, P, 1908–1915
- Adam Warren, P, 2012–2015, 2016–2018
- Will Warren, P, 2024–present
- George Washburn, P, 1941
- Claudell Washington, OF, 1986–1988, 1990
- Gary Waslewski, P, 1970–1971
- Allen Watson, P, 1999–2000
- Bob Watson, IF, 1980–1982
- Roy Weatherly, OF, 1943–1946
- David Weathers, P, 1996–1997
- Ryan Weathers, P, 2026-Present
- Jim Weaver, P, 1931
- Jeff Weaver, P, 2002–2003
- Luke Weaver, P, 2023–2025
- Tyler Webb, P, 2017
- Ryan Weber, P, 2022–2023
- Dave Wehrmeister, P, 1981
- Lefty Weinert, P, 1931
- Greg Weissert, P, 2022–2023
- Austin Wells, C, 2023–present
- David Wells, P, 1997–1998, 2002–2003
- Ed Wells, P, 1929–1932
- Vernon Wells, OF, 2013
- Charley Wensloff, P, 1943–1947
- Julie Wera, IF, 1927, 1929
- Billy Werber, IF, 1930, 1933
- Dennis Werth, IF, 1979–1981
- Jake Westbrook, P, 2000
- John Wetteland, P, 1995–1996
- Stefan Wever, P, 1982
- Zelous Wheeler, 3B, 2014
- Kevin Whelan, P, 2011
- Steve Whitaker, OF, 1966–1968
- Gabe White, P, 2003–2004
- Roy White, OF, 1965–1979
- Rondell White, OF, 2002
- Wally Whitehurst, P, 1996
- George Whiteman, OF, 1913
- Mark Whiten, OF, 1997
- Terry Whitfield, OF, 1974–1976
- Chase Whitley, P, 2014–2015
- Ed Whitson, P, 1985–1986
- Kemp Wicker, P, 1936–1938
- Al Wickland, OF, 1919
- Bob Wickman, P, 1992–1996
- Chris Widger, C, 2002
- Bob Wiesler, P, 1951–1955
- Bill Wight, P, 1946–1947
- Ted Wilborn, OF, 1980
- Ed Wilkinson, OF, 1911
- Bernie Williams, OF, 1991–2006
- Bob Williams, C, 1911–1913
- Devin Williams, P, 2025
- Gerald Williams, OF, 1992–1996, 2001–2002
- Harry Williams, IF, 1913–1914
- Jimmy Williams, IF, 1901–1907
- Mason Williams, OF, 2015–2017
- Stan Williams, P, 1963–1964
- Todd Williams, P, 2001
- Walt Williams, OF, 1974–1975
- Archie Wilson, OF, 1951–1952
- Craig Wilson, OF, 2006
- Enrique Wilson, IF, 2001–2004
- George Wilson, OF, 1956
- Justin Wilson, P, 2015, 2021
- Kris Wilson, P, 2006
- Pete Wilson, P, 1908–1909
- Snake Wiltse, P, 1902–1903
- Allan Winans, P, 2025
- Gordie Windhorn, OF, 1959
- **Dave Winfield**, OF, 1981–1988, 1990
- Randy Winn, OF, 2010
- DeWayne Wise, OF, 2012
- Jay Witasick, P, 2001
- Mickey Witek, IF, 1949
- Mike Witt, P, 1990–1993
- Whitey Witt, OF, 1922–1925
- Mark Wohlers, P, 2001
- Asher Wojciechowski, P, 2021
- Barney Wolfe, P, 1903–1904
- Harry Wolter, OF, 1910–1913
- Harry Wolverton, IF, 1912
- Dooley Womack, P, 1966–1968
- Tony Womack, IF, 2005
- Kerry Wood, P, 2010
- Gene Woodling, OF, 1949–1954
- Ron Woods, OF, 1969–1971
- Dick Woodson, P, 1974
- Hank Workman, IF, 1950
- Chase Wright, P, 2007
- Jaret Wright, P, 2005–2006
- Ken Wright, P, 1974
- Yats Wuestling, IF, 1930
- John Wyatt, P, 1968
- Butch Wynegar, C, 1982–1986
- Jimmy Wynn, OF, 1977

== Y ==
- Miguel Yajure, P, 2020
- Ryan Yarbrough, P, 2025–present
- Ed Yarnall, P, 1999–2000
- Kirby Yates, P, 2016
- George Yeager, C, 1902
- Joe Yeager, IF, 1905–1906
- Stan Yerkes, P, 1901
- Jim York, P, 1976
- Kevin Youkilis, IF, 2013
- Chris Young, OF, 2014–2015
- Curt Young, P, 1992
- Eric Young Jr., DH, 2016
- Ralph Young, IF, 1913

== Z ==
- Tom Zachary, P, 1928–1930
- Mike Zagurski, P, 2013
- Jack Zalusky, C, 1903
- George Zeber, IF, 1977–1978
- Rollie Zeider, IF, 1913
- Todd Zeile, IF, 2003
- Guy Zinn, OF, 1911–1912
- Bill Zuber, P, 1943–1946
- Paul Zuvella, IF, 1986–1987
