= 1912 New York Highlanders season =

Baseball team season

1912 New York Highlanders
- League: American League
- Ballpark: Hilltop Park
- City: New York City, New York
- Record: 50–102 (.329)
- League place: 8th
- Owners: William Devery and Frank Farrell
- Managers: Harry Wolverton

The 1912 New York Highlanders season was the team's tenth. It was the final season for the "Highlanders", before officially adopting the already more common "Yankees". It was also their final season playing their home games at Hilltop Park. The team finished with a total of 50 wins and 102 losses, coming in 8th, last place in the American League. The club was managed by Harry Wolverton. The New York franchise would not finish in last place again until 1966. To date, this remains the second and last 100-loss season in Yankees history, the other being a few years prior in 1908. After previously appearing on the team's caps, jackets, and even the sleeves of the uniform, this was the first season that the famous "NY" logo would appear on the front of the jerseys.

== Regular season ==
=== Logo and uniforms ===
For 1912, the curving "NY" migrated from the sleeve to its now-familiar spot on the left breast of the jersey (on some versions of the uniform, though not the one shown here). This was also the year that pinstripes were introduced.

=== Team nickname ===
By this season, the alternate nickname "Yankees" was in very common usage by the media. The New York Times for Opening Day 1912 reported that "The Yankees presented a natty appearance in their new uniforms of white with black pinstripes." The pinstripes were a one-year experiment, but they would return for good on the home uniforms in 1915.

The final game of the season, and the final game for the "Highlanders" at the Hilltop, was played on October 5, 1912. The team moved to the Polo Grounds the following year. Hilltop Park was closed after the 1912 season and was demolished in 1914. It is now occupied by the New York-Presbyterian Hospital.

=== Season standings ===
American League
Team	W	L	Pct.	GB	Home	Road
Boston Red Sox	105	47	.691	—	57‍–‍20	48‍–‍27
Washington Senators	91	61	.599	14	45‍–‍32	46‍–‍29
Philadelphia Athletics	90	62	.592	15	45‍–‍31	45‍–‍31
Chicago White Sox	78	76	.506	28	34‍–‍43	44‍–‍33
Cleveland Naps	75	78	.490	30½	41‍–‍35	34‍–‍43
Detroit Tigers	69	84	.451	36½	37‍–‍39	32‍–‍45
St. Louis Browns	53	101	.344	53	27‍–‍50	26‍–‍51
New York Highlanders	50	102	.329	55	31‍–‍44	19‍–‍58

=== Record vs. opponents ===
1912 American League record Sources:
Team	BOS	CWS	CLE	DET	NYH	PHA	SLB	WSH
Boston	—	16–6–1	11–11–1	15–6	19–2	15–7	17–5	12–10
Chicago	6–16–1	—	11–11	14–8–1	13–9	12–10	13–9–2	9–13
Cleveland	11–11–1	11–11	—	13–9	13–8–1	8–14	15–7	4–18
Detroit	6–15	8–14–1	9–13	—	16–6	9–13	13–9	8–14
New York	2–19	9–13	8–13–1	6–16	—	5–17	13–9	7–15
Philadelphia	7–15	10–12	14–8	13–9	17–5	—	16–6	13–7–1
St. Louis	5–17	9–13–2	7–15	9–13	9–13	6–16	—	8–14–1
Washington	10–12	13–9	18–4	14–8	15–7	7–13–1	14–8–1	—

=== Notable transactions ===
- July 21, 1912: Del Paddock was purchased by the Highlanders from the Dubuque Hustlers.

=== Roster ===
1912 New York Highlanders
Roster
Pitchers: Ray Caldwell; George Davis; Ray Fisher; Russ Ford; Chet Hoff; Ray Keating; George McConnell; Jack Quinn; Al Schulz; George Shears; Tommy Thompson; Hippo Vaughn; Jack Warhop	Catchers: Gus Fisher; Gabby Street; Ed Sweeney; Homer Thompson; Bob Williams; Infielders: George Batten; Hal Chase; Curt Coleman; Cozy Dolan; John Dowd; Earle Gardner; Roy Hartzell; Jack Martin; Tommy McMillan; Ezra Midkiff; Del Paddock; Hack Simmons; Bill Stumpf; Harry Wolverton	Outfielders: Birdie Cree; Bert Daniels; Benny Kauff; Jack Lelivelt; Jack Little; Pat Maloney; Bill Otis; Klondike Smith; Dutch Sterrett; Harry Wolter; Guy Zinn; Other batters: Johnny Priest	Manager: Harry Wolverton

== Player stats ==
=== Batting ===
==== Starters by position ====
Note: Pos = Position; G = Games played; AB = At bats; H = Hits; Avg. = Batting average; HR = Home runs; RBI = Runs batted in

Pos	Player	G	AB	H	Avg.	HR	RBI
C	Ed Sweeney	110	351	94	.268	0	30
1B	Hal Chase	131	522	143	.274	4	58
2B	Hack Simmons	110	401	96	.239	0	41
SS	Jack Martin	71	231	52	.225	0	17
3B	Del Paddock	46	156	45	.288	1	14
OF	Roy Hartzell	125	416	113	.272	1	38
OF	Bert Daniels	135	496	136	.274	2	41
OF	Guy Zinn	106	401	105	.262	6	55

==== Other batters ====
Note: G = Games played; AB = At bats; H = Hits; Avg. = Batting average; HR = Home runs; RBI = Runs batted in

Player	G	AB	H	Avg.	HR	RBI
Dutch Sterrett	66	230	61	.265	1	32
Birdie Cree	50	190	63	.332	0	22
Earle Gardner	43	160	45	.281	0	26
Tommy McMillan	41	149	34	.228	0	12
Jack Lelivelt	36	149	54	.362	2	23
Bill Stumpf	42	129	31	.240	0	10
Gabby Street	29	88	16	.182	0	6
Ezra Midkiff	21	86	21	.244	0	9
Pat Maloney	25	79	17	.215	0	4
Cozy Dolan	18	60	12	.200	0	11
Harry Wolverton	34	50	15	.300	0	4
Bob Williams	20	44	6	.136	0	3
Curt Coleman	12	37	9	.243	0	4
Harry Wolter	12	32	11	.344	0	1
John Dowd	10	31	6	.194	0	0
Klondike Smith	7	27	5	.185	0	0
Bill Otis	4	17	1	.059	0	2
Jack Little	3	12	3	.250	0	0
Benny Kauff	5	11	3	.273	0	2
Gus Fisher	4	10	1	.100	0	0
George Batten	1	3	0	.000	0	0
Johnny Priest	2	2	1	.500	0	1
Homer Thompson	1	0	0	----	0	0

=== Pitching ===
==== Starting pitchers ====
Note: G = Games pitched; IP = Innings pitched; W = Wins; L = Losses; ERA = Earned run average; SO = Strikeouts

Player	G	IP	W	L	ERA	SO
Russ Ford	36	291.2	13	21	3.55	112
Ray Caldwell	30	183.1	8	16	4.47	95
George McConnell	23	176.2	8	12	2.75	91
Ray Fisher	17	90.1	2	8	5.88	47
Ray Keating	6	35.2	0	3	5.80	21

==== Other pitchers ====
Note: G = Games pitched; IP = Innings pitched; W = Wins; L = Losses; ERA = Earned run average; SO = Strikeouts

Player	G	IP	W	L	ERA	SO
Jack Warhop	39	258.0	10	19	2.86	110
Jack Quinn	18	102.2	5	7	5.79	47
Hippo Vaughn	15	63.0	2	8	5.14	46
George Davis	10	54.0	1	4	6.50	22
Tommy Thompson	7	32.2	0	2	6.06	15
Al Schulz	3	16.1	1	1	2.20	8
Chet Hoff	5	15.2	0	1	6.89	14

==== Relief pitchers ====
Note: G = Games pitched; W = Wins; L = Losses; SV = Saves; ERA = Earned run average; SO = Strikeouts

Player	G	W	L	SV	ERA	SO
George Shears	4	0	0	0	5.40	9
