= John Dowd =

John Dowd may refer to:

- John M. Dowd (born 1941), American attorney
- John Dowd (politician) (born 1940), former opposition leader in New South Wales
- John Dowd (motocross) (born 1965), professional motocross racer
- John Albert Dowd (1876–1932), politician in Saskatchewan, Canada
- John H. Dowd (marketer, 1922–2004), advertising executive
- John Dowd (baseball) (1891–1981), American baseball player
- Johnny Dowd (born 1948), American country musician
- John F. Dowd (1894–1961), American politician, sheriff of Suffolk County, Massachusetts

== See also ==
- Jon Dowd, fictional baseball player used as a replacement for Barry Bonds in MVP Baseball 2004 and 2005, due to Bonds leaving the MLB players association
