= 1911 College Baseball All-Southern Team =

All-star college baseball team

The 1911 College Baseball All-Southern Team consists of baseball players selected at their respective positions after the 1911 NCAA baseball season.

== All-Southerns ==
Position	Name	School
Pitcher	Bob Gantt	Trinity
Pitcher	Tommy Thompson	Georgia
Pitcher	John D. Voss	Mercer
Catcher	Ray Morrison	Vanderbilt
Catcher	Homer Thompson	Georgia
First baseman	Calhoun	Georgia Tech
Second baseman	Garnett Brooks	Georgia
Third baseman	Harry Holland	Georgia Tech
Shortstop	Baumgardner	Alabama
Outfielder	H. A. McDowell	Alabama
Outfielder	Frank Cooper	Trinity
Outfielder	Carl Sloan	Georgia Tech
Utility	Jenks Gillem	Sewanee

All players were selected by John Heisman.
