= John Lovett (baseball) =

American baseball player (1877–1937)

- Pitcher
- Born: May 6, 1877; Monday, Ohio
- Died: December 5, 1937 (aged 60); Murray City, Ohio
- Batted: Unknown Threw: Unknown

MLB debut
- May 22, 1903, for the St. Louis Cardinals

Last MLB appearance
- May 26, 1903, for the St. Louis Cardinals

MLB statistics
- Win–loss record: 0-0
- Earned run average: 5.40
- Strikeouts: 3
- Stats at Baseball Reference

Teams
- St. Louis Cardinals (1903)

John Lovett (May 6, 1877 – December 5, 1937) was a professional baseball player who played pitcher in the Major Leagues in 1903 for the St. Louis Cardinals.

Born in Monday, Ohio, Lovett was 26 years old when he broke into the big leagues on May 22, 1903, with the Cardinals.
