= Bob Williams (baseball) =

American baseball player (1884–1962)

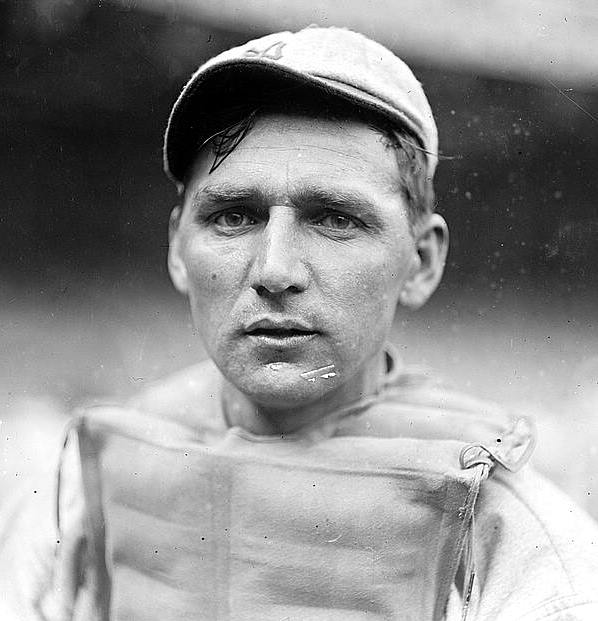
- Catcher
- Born: April 27, 1884; Monday, Ohio, U.S.
- Died: August 6, 1962 (aged 78); Nelsonville, Ohio, U.S.
- Batted: Right Threw: Right

MLB debut
- July 3, 1911, for the New York Highlanders

Last MLB appearance
- September 30, 1913, for the New York Yankees

MLB statistics
- Batting average: .164
- Home runs: 0
- hits: 11
- Stats at Baseball Reference

Teams
- New York Highlanders/Yankees (1911–13)

Robert Elias Williams (April 27, 1884 – August 6, 1962) was an American professional baseball player who was a catcher with the New York Highlanders/Yankees in the American League. He was released by the Yankees in 1913 to the Rochester Club of the International League.
