= John H. Dowd =

American advertising executive (1922–2004)

John H. "Jack" Dowd Jr. (1922–2004) was a Hershey Chocolate Company brand manager who negotiated the marketing agreement that placed Reese's Pieces in Steven Spielberg's E.T. the Extra-Terrestrial. He later worked as an advertising executive,

== Early life and education ==
During World War II, Dowd served in an army infantry unit that conducted patrols behind enemy lines. He was awarded a Silver Star, three Bronze Stars, three Purple Hearts and the Combat Infantryman Badge. He was later transferred to Military Intelligence and discharged as a First Lieutenant.

After graduating from the University of Connecticut he was accepted at the Harvard School of Business at which he received his MBA in 1948.

After graduation, he spent a few years at Standard Brands before moving on to an 18-year career with advertising agencies in Boston and New York. Dowd directed the advertising for various products from margarine and meat spreads to chemicals and concrete.

== Hershey career ==
In 1966, Dowd joined Hershey Chocolate Company. This was early in the new management of the company by Bill Deardon and Dowd was key in rethinking how the company operated. Prior to Dowd's hiring Hershey did not advertise, it used a network of product promoting salesmen to sell the product to wholesalers and groceries and assumed the buyers would make sure their product moved out to the general public. He focused on rethinking of who their customers were: not the wholesalers and grocery stores but the end consumers who ate the product. He began as brands manager and advanced to vice president of new business development.

Dowd was responsible in the 1970s for the promotional ad blitz that made Reese's Peanut Butter Cups a major success.

In 1982, Dowd negotiated a contract for Reese's Pieces to appear in Steven Spielberg's E.T. the Extra-Terrestrial, the first promotion in the company's history, as reported in People Dowd in his initial interactions with Soeiberger made sure that E.T. was a friendly alien before signing off on the deal. He also managed to get the product placement without having to pay for it. At the time, Reese's Pieces had been on the market only five years and sales skyrocketed after the film was released, especially in movie theatres.

He was named "Consumer Products Man of the Year" by Sales and Marketing magazine. His story was included in the book Emperors of Chocolate, a book by a person with familial connection to some of Dowd's colleges at Hershey about the late 1960s and into the 1970s turnaround at Hershey that Dowd was a part of, and in the February 1999 issue of Reader's Digest. In 1999 he was inducted into the University of Connecticut School of Business Hall of Fame.

== Personal life ==
Dowd and his wife Mary Ann met while both students at the University of Connecticut. They had two children.
