= Harry Wolverton =

American baseball player (1873–1937)

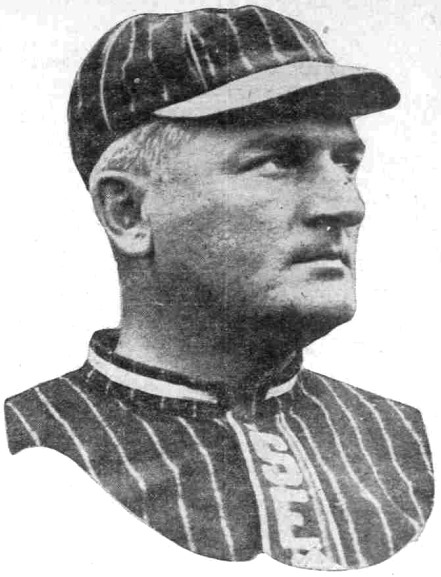
- Third baseman / Manager
- Born: December 6, 1873; Mount Vernon, Ohio, U.S.
- Died: February 4, 1937 (aged 63); Oakland, California, U.S.
- Batted: Switch Threw: Right

MLB debut
- September 25, 1898, for the Chicago Orphans

Last MLB appearance
- September 25, 1912, for the New York Highlanders

MLB statistics
- Batting average: .278
- Home runs: 7
- Runs batted in: 352
- Stats at Baseball Reference

Teams
- As player: Chicago Orphans (1898–1900); Philadelphia Phillies (1900–1901); Washington Senators (1902); Philadelphia Phillies (1902–1904); Boston Beaneaters (1905); New York Highlanders (1912); As manager: New York Highlanders (1912)

Harry Sterling Wolverton (December 6, 1873 – February 4, 1937), nicknamed "Fighting Harry", was an American professional baseball player. He played all or part of nine seasons in Major League Baseball from 1898 through 1905 and 1912. He played for the Chicago Orphans, Philadelphia Phillies, Washington Senators, Boston Beaneaters, and New York Highlanders, primarily as a third baseman. He also managed the Highlanders in 1912.

In addition to playing in MLB, Wolverton managed several minor league baseball teams. After he retired from baseball, he worked as a police officer with the Oakland Police Department.

== Early life ==
Wolverton was born in Mount Vernon, Ohio, on December 6, 1873, to Amanda and John the Baptist Wolverton. John, a veteran of the Civil War, worked with Amanda's father in dyeing. Harry had an older brother, Fred, and a younger sister, Birdie. Fred became a dentist, while Birdie married and moved to Florida.

Wolverton played sandlot ball, and then played for his high school baseball team. Wolverton then enrolled at Kenyon College, where he played American football as a halfback, and baseball as a catcher. However, he left Kenyon after his junior year, as he was facing possible expulsion. Wolverton played semi-professional baseball for a Paulding, Ohio team for the summer of 1895, earning $60 a month ($2,322 in current dollar terms) as a pitcher and first baseman.

== Professional career ==
=== Minor leagues ===
Wolverton signed with the Columbus Senators of the Western League on February 22, 1896, beginning his professional career in minor league baseball as a pitcher. During the 1896 season, he struggled with his control, relegating him to the role of a relief pitcher. He did register a .385 batting average in limited at-bats.

The next season, Wolverton was demoted to the Dubuque, Iowa franchise of the Western Association. Pitching for Dubuque, Wolverton hurt his pitching arm. Dubuque began to play Wolverton as a third baseman. His .294 batting average led the team, and he was named team captain. Columbus soon recalled Wolverton, and he responded by posting a .400 batting average through July 1898.

=== Major leagues ===
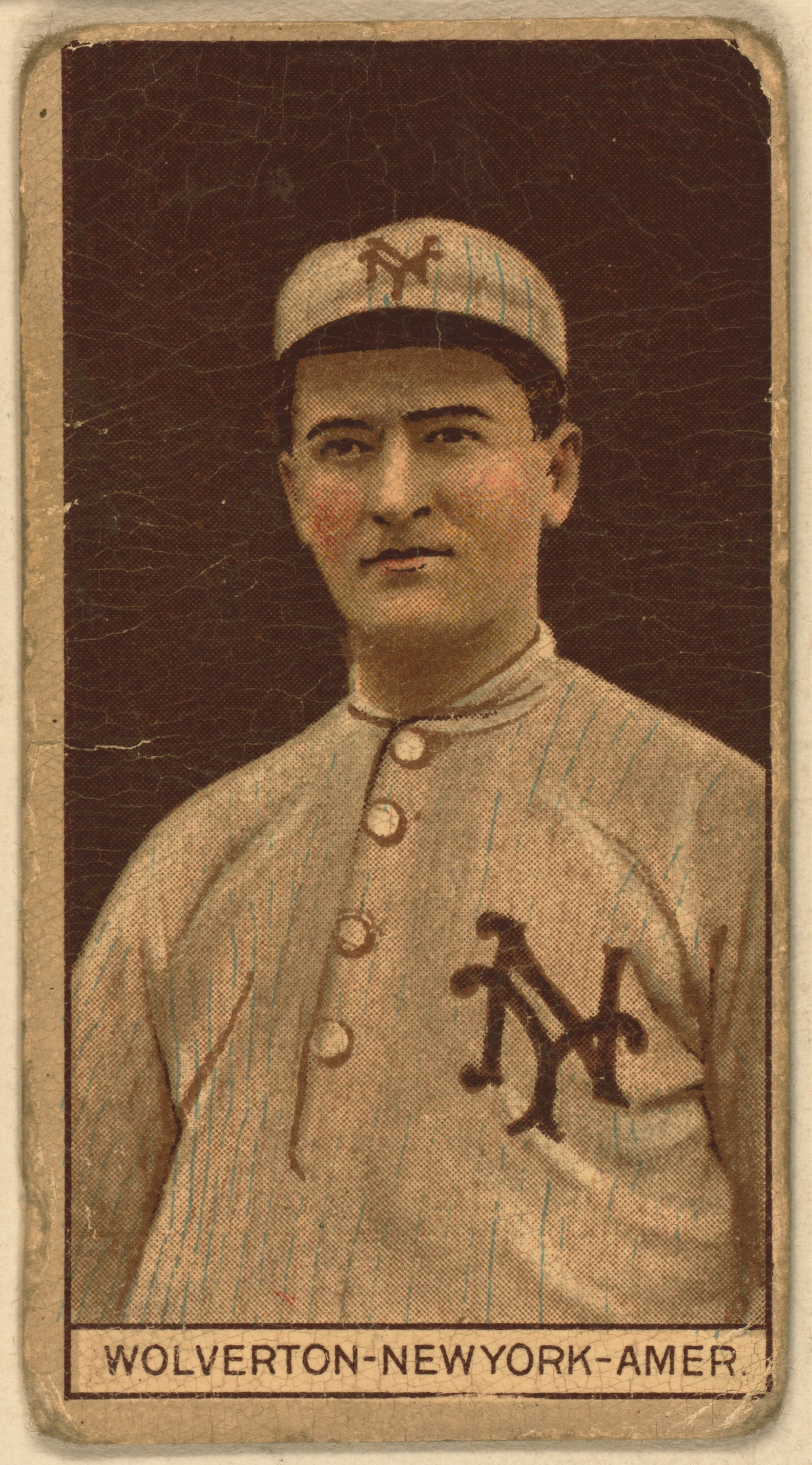
A baseball card featuring Wolverton

In August 1898, the Chicago Orphans of the National League (NL), a major league, purchased Wolverton from Columbus. He made his debut with the Orphans on September 25. Manager Tom Burns named Wolverton his starting third baseman in 1899, and batted him third in the lineup. The Orphans sold Wolverton to the Philadelphia Phillies on April 28, 1900.

Wolverton tied a major league record in 1900 by hitting three triples in one game against the Pittsburgh Pirates. That season, he batted .282 for the Phillies, recording a career-high 58 runs batted in in 101 games. Late in the 1900 season, he was struck in the head by a pole beside the Philadelphia streetcar tracks, fracturing his skull. He returned to finish the season for the Phillies. Wolverton batted .309 in 93 games in 1901, but broke his collarbone in a collision with Fred Tenney of the Boston Beaneaters. He led the NL in fielding percentage among third baseman (.921).

After a dispute with Phillies management about his contract after the 1901 season, Wolverton signed a contract with the Washington Senators of the rival American League. Courts in Washington and Philadelphia ruled that the move was legal, but that Wolverton could not play in the state of Pennsylvania unless he played for the Phillies. Wolverton hit .249 and committed 24 errors in 59 games with Washington. Wolverton expressed his desire to return to Philadelphia, and the Senators acknowledged that signing Wolverton was a mistake. Wolverton finished the season with the Phillies, where he hit .294 in 34 games. In the 1903 season, he batted .308 with 12 triples, a career high, in 123 games. He again led all NL third basemen in fielding percentage (.941).

Wolverton batted .266 in 102 games during the 1904 season, once again leading NL third basemen in fielding percentage (.925). After the season, the Phillies traded Wolverton to the Beaneaters with Chick Fraser for Togie Pittinger. He played for one season with Boston, batting .225. Though his .934 fielding percentage was second best among NL third basemen, trailing only Doc Casey, the Beaneaters released Wolverton after the season.

=== Player-manager ===
Wolverton returned to minor league baseball, joining the Williamsport Millionaires of the Tri-State League in 1906 as their third baseman. The next year, he became their player-manager. He continued with Williamsport through the 1908 season. He then became player-manager of the Newark Indians of the Eastern League in 1909. Joe McGinnity purchased Newark and announced that he would continue to pitch for the team. After Wolverton removed McGinnity from a game, the owner demoted Wolverton to team captain and assumed managerial duties for the remainder of the season.

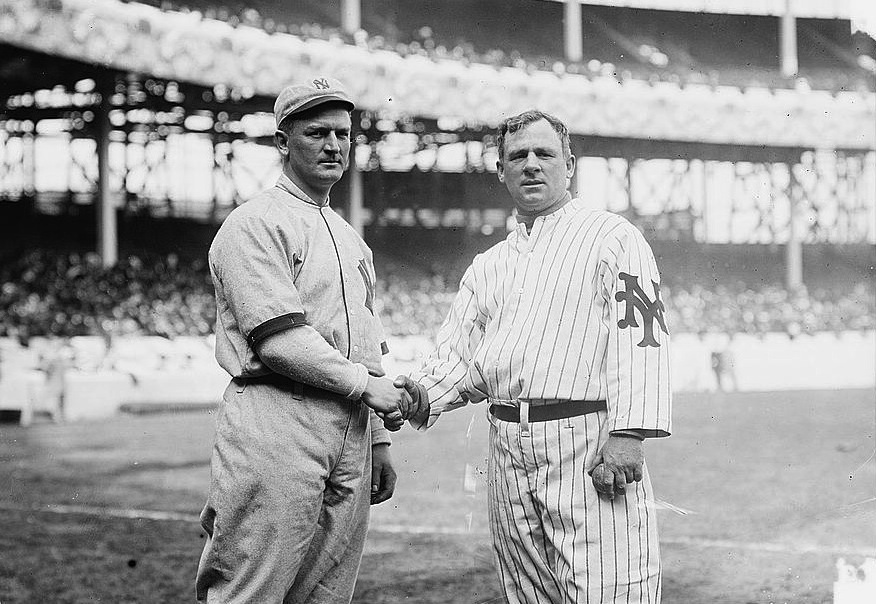
Wolverton (left) with John McGraw at the Polo Grounds in 1912.

Wolverton managed the Oakland Oaks of the Pacific Coast League (PCL) in 1910 and 1911. A team with little fan support, Wolverton led the Oaks into contention in the PCL, which brought fans to the stadium. Wolverton attempted to purchase the Oaks, but was rebuffed. He was also offered the managerial job in Newark, but he declined, opting to remain in Oakland.

In 1912, Wolverton was named manager of the New York Highlanders of the AL, replacing Hal Chase. He led the Highlanders to a last-place finish and a 50–102 record (.329 winning percentage). He inserted himself into games as a pinch hitter, batting .300 in limited playing time. Despite his efforts to reverse the team's fortunes, he was let go by Frank J. Farrell after the 1912 season.

Wolverton returned to the PCL, managing the Sacramento Sacts in 1913 and 1914. He purchased the team with a business partner after the 1913 season for $20,000 ($651,515 in current dollar terms), but the team lost $24,000 the next year ($771,429 in current dollar terms) and went bankrupt. He managed the San Francisco Seals of the PCL from 1915 through June 17, 1917, when he was fired. He led the Seals to the PCL championship in 1915, and had the Seals in first place at the time of his firing, which team owner Henry Berry said was over player salaries. Wolverton announced his retirement from baseball.

Wolverton returned to professional baseball as the manager of the Seattle Indians of the PCL in 1923. He argued with the team's owners about the amount of money spent to acquire new players, and resigned on July 8, 1923.

=== Managerial record ===
| Team | Year | Regular season | | | | | Postseason | | | |
| Team | Year | Games | Won | Lost | Win % | Finish | Won | Lost | Win % | Result |
|---|---|---|---|---|---|---|---|---|---|---|
| NYH | 1912 | 152 | 50 | 102 | .329 | 8th in AL | – | – | – | – |
| Total | | 152 | 50 | 102 | .329 | | 0 | 0 | – | |

== Personal life ==
Wolverton married Mary Maroney in 1903. They had five daughters. One of his daughters, Mary, died of an illness at the age of 10 on April 28, 1920.

Wolverton purchased a farm in San Mateo, California in July 1917, after he was fired from the Seals. In 1931, he became a police officer with the Oakland Police Department.

Wolverton died in Oakland, California, at age 63 in a hit-and-run automobile accident. He was on patrol that day, and it was the second hit-and-run accident he suffered during the shift. He is interred at Cypress Lawn Memorial Park in Colma, California.

== See also ==
- List of Major League Baseball player–managers
