= George Batten (baseball) =

American baseball player (1891-1972)

- Second baseman
- Born: October 7, 1891; Haddonfield, New Jersey
- Died: August 4, 1972 (aged 80); New Port Richey, Florida
- Batted: Right Threw: Right

MLB debut
- September 28, 1912, for the New York Highlanders

Last MLB appearance
- September 28, 1912, for the New York Highlanders

MLB statistics
- Games played: 1
- Batting average: .000
- Runs batted in: 0
- Stats at Baseball Reference

Teams
- New York Highlanders (1912)

George Burnett Batten (October 7, 1891 – August 4, 1972) was an infielder in Major League Baseball. He went 0-for-3 in his one-game major league career on September 28, 1912.

After baseball, Batten operated a hotel and restaurant in Cape May, New Jersey. He also served as a member of the Old Timers Baseball Association. He died at Community Hospital in New Port Richey, Florida on August 4, 1972 after moving there in retirement from Somers Point, New Jersey. His funeral would be held at Cold Spring Cemetery in Cape May.
