= Del Paddock =

American baseball player (1887–1952)

- Third baseman
- Born: June 8, 1887; Volga, South Dakota
- Died: February 6, 1952 (aged 64); Remer, Minnesota, U.S.
- Batted: Left Threw: Right

MLB debut
- April 14, 1912, for the Chicago White Sox

Last MLB appearance
- October 1, 1912, for the New York Highlanders

MLB statistics
- Batting average: .287
- Home runs: 1
- Runs batted in: 14
- Stats at Baseball Reference

Teams
- Chicago White Sox (1912); New York Highlanders (1912)

Delmar Harold Paddock (June 8, 1887 – February 6, 1952) was a Major League Baseball third baseman. He played part of the 1912 season in the majors with two different teams, the Chicago White Sox and the New York Highlanders.

Paddock began his professional baseball career as a pitcher with the Vancouver Beavers of the Northwestern League in 1908. After two years with Vancouver, he was converted to an infielder in 1910 while playing for the Calgary Bronchos of the Western Canada League. He was purchased by the White Sox from the Dubuque Hustlers of the Illinois–Indiana–Iowa League after the 1911 season.

After the 1912 season, Paddock returned to the minor leagues with the Rochester Hustlers, who purchased him from New York. Starting that season, he spent the rest of his career primarily as an outfielder, although he did pitch briefly for the Mitchell Kernels of the South Dakota League in 1920. He retired after the 1921 season, which he spent with the Sioux City Packers of the Western League.

== Sources ==
- Career statistics from Baseball Reference · Baseball Reference (Minors) · Retrosheet · Baseball Almanac

== External Sources ==
- Del Paddock at SABR Bio Project
