= Jack Martin (baseball) =

American baseball player (1887-1980)

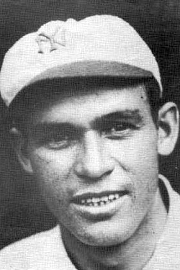
- Shortstop
- Born: April 19, 1887; Plainfield, New Jersey, U.S.
- Died: July 4, 1980 (aged 93); The Bronx, New York, U.S.
- Batted: Right Threw: Right

MLB debut
- April 25, 1912, for the New York Highlanders

Last MLB appearance
- October 6, 1914, for the Philadelphia Phillies

MLB statistics
- Batting average: .237
- Home runs: 0
- RBIs: 43
- Stats at Baseball Reference

Teams
- New York Highlanders (1912); Boston Braves (1914); Philadelphia Phillies (1914)

John Christopher Martin (April 19, 1887 – July 4, 1980) was an American weak-hitting, slick-fielding infielder in Major League Baseball, playing mainly at shortstop for three different teams between the 1912 and 1914 seasons. Listed at 5 ft 9 in (1.75 m), 159 lb., he batted and threw right-handed.

A native of Plainfield, New Jersey, Martin played baseball for Plainfield High School.

After a lengthy minor league baseball career, Martin entered the majors in 1912 as the regular shortstop for the Yankees, when they were known as the New York Highlanders. In 1914, he divided his playing time between the Boston Braves and Philadelphia Phillies.

In a three-year career, Martin was a .237 hitter (144-for-608) with 66 runs and 43 RBI in 187 games, including 13 doubles, four triples, 20 stolen bases, and a .323 on-base percentage without home runs.

Following his playing retirement, Martin became a manager and coach in the minor leagues. He managed Jim Thorpe when Thorpe played for the 1916 Milwaukee Brewers in the American Association.

In 1954, Martin moved to Brick Township, New Jersey, where he lived out his twilight years. He was beloved and well known for helping his neighbors. In 1978 was honored by the Brick Township council for being an inspiration to youth, as the Jack Martin Boulevard is named after him.

Martin suffered two heart attacks just after being introduced at the 34th annual New York Yankees Old-Timers' Day on June 21, 1980. He died 13 days later after having been hospitalized at Montefiore Hospital in The Bronx, New York. At the time of his death, at age 93, Martin was the oldest living former Yankees and Phillies player.

== Chronology ==
- May 25, 1912 – During the first game of a double-header at Hilltop Park, Martin was hit by a pitch twice by Washington Senators pitcher Walter Johnson. The second time he had his jaw shattered by a fastball and, eventually, was out of action for five weeks. Johnson‚ who consciously avoided throwing at batters nevertheless hit 205 batters in his illustrious career.
