= Klondike Smith =

English baseball player (1887-1959)

- Outfielder
- Born: January 4, 1887; London, United Kingdom
- Died: November 15, 1959 (aged 72); Springfield, Massachusetts
- Batted: Left Threw: Left

MLB debut
- September 28, 1912, for the New York Highlanders

Last MLB appearance
- October 5, 1912, for the New York Highlanders

MLB statistics
- Batting average: .185
- Home runs: 0
- RBIs: 0
- Stats at Baseball Reference

Teams
- New York Highlanders (1912)

Armstrong Frederick "Klondike" Smith (January 4, 1887 – November 15, 1959) was an English born Major League Baseball outfielder. He started the last seven games of the 1912 season for the New York Highlanders, who were 50–102 and finished in last place in the American League. The 25-year-old rookie was a native of London.

Smith made his major league debut in a September 28 double-header against the Philadelphia Athletics at Shibe Park. His last appearance was on October 5 in a home game against the Washington Senators at Hilltop Park. That was the only game the Highlanders won while Smith was in the lineup.

During his brief time in the big leagues he was 5-for-27 (.185) with one double and one stolen base. In the field he recorded ten putouts and made no errors.

Smith died at the age of 72 of a heart attack while visiting friends in Springfield, Massachusetts. He is buried in Lawrence, Massachusetts.
