= Jack Little (outfielder) =

American baseball player (1891-1961)

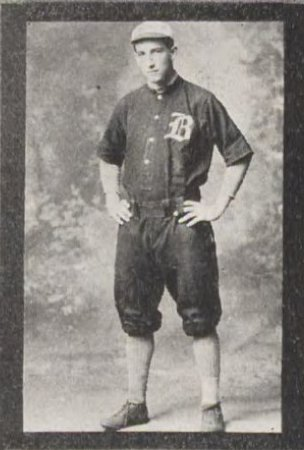
- Little at Baylor in 1911
- Outfielder
- Born: March 12, 1891; Mart, Texas
- Died: July 27, 1961 (aged 70); Dallas, Texas
- Batted: Right Threw: Right

MLB debut
- July 2, 1912, for the New York Highlanders

Last MLB appearance
- September 15, 1912, for the New York Highlanders

MLB statistics
- Batting average: .250
- Home runs: 0
- Runs batted in: 0

Teams
- New York Highlanders (1912)

William Arthur (Jack) Little (March 12, 1891 – July 27, 1961) was a Major League Baseball outfielder. Little played for the New York Highlanders in 1912. In 3 career games, he had 3 hits in 12 at-bats. He batted and threw right-handed.

He attended Baylor University.

Little was born in Mart, Texas and died in Dallas, Texas.
