= George Shears =

American baseball player (1890–1978)

- Pitcher
- Born: April 13, 1890; Marshall, Missouri, U.S.
- Died: November 12, 1978 (aged 88); Loveland, Colorado, U.S.
- Batted: Right Threw: Right

MLB debut
- April 24, 1912, for the New York Highlanders

Last MLB appearance
- June 20, 1912, for the New York Highlanders

MLB statistics
- Win–loss record: 0–0
- Earned run average: 5.40
- Strikeouts: 9
- Stats at Baseball Reference

Teams
- New York Highlanders (1912)

George Penfield Shears (April 13, 1890 – November 12, 1978) was an American Major League Baseball pitcher. In 1912, Shears played for the New York Highlanders. In 4 career games, he had a 0–0 record, with a 5.40 ERA. He batted right-handed and threw left-handed.

George Shears was a Doctor of Chiropractic who led the G.P.C. chiropractic movement in the late 1930s, 1940s and early 1950s. Shears was born in Marshall, Missouri, and died in Loveland, Colorado.
