= Red Hoff =

American baseball player (1891-1998)

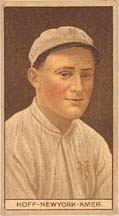
- Pitcher
- Born: May 8, 1891; Ossining, New York, U.S.
- Died: September 17, 1998 (aged 107); Daytona Beach, Florida, U.S.
- Batted: Left Threw: Left

MLB debut
- September 6, 1911, for the New York Highlanders

Last MLB appearance
- October 2, 1915, for the St. Louis Browns

MLB statistics
- Win–loss record: 2-4
- Earned run average: 2.49
- Innings pitched: 83
- Stats at Baseball Reference

Teams
- New York Highlanders/Yankees (1911–1913); St. Louis Browns (1915)

Chester Cornelius "Red" Hoff (May 8, 1891 – September 17, 1998) was an American left-handed pitcher in Major League Baseball.

== Biography ==
=== Early life ===
Chester ("Chet" or "Red") Hoff was born in Ossining, New York, the fifth child (and fourth son) of Walter, a railroad worker, and Harriet Hoff.

=== Baseball career ===
Hoff made his major league debut on September 6, 1911. Pitching against the Detroit Tigers in his second appearance on September 18 at the wood-grandstand Hilltop Park in Washington Heights, Manhattan on the site now occupied by Columbia-Presbyterian Medical Center, he struck out Ty Cobb. In later years, Hoff recalled this as the highlight of his career.

Hoff played in a total of 12 games during the 1911, 1912 and 1913 seasons with the New York Highlanders/Yankees, and he pitched in 11 games with the 1915 St. Louis Browns with a 2-2 record and a 1.24 ERA.

Hoff went on to play for a minor league baseball team in Rochester in 1914 and with the St. Louis Browns in 1915.

=== Oldest National or American Leaguer ===
Although he only appeared in 23 games, Hoff is best remembered for being the oldest living ex-major leaguer at the time of his death in Daytona Beach, Florida, at the age of 107. This record was later surpassed by former Negro leagues pitcher Silas Simmons. Hoff died of complications resulting from a fall.

At the time of his death, he was the last surviving person to have played in Major League Baseball during the dead-ball era, the historically low-scoring period from 1901 to 1920.

=== Later life ===
After his professional baseball career ended, he returned to Ossining and pitched semipro baseball on Sundays for 10 years, facing some top Negro league teams as well as inmates at the Sing Sing state prison in games inside the penitentiary walls. He worked as a map cutter for Rand McNally in Ossining before retiring to Florida in the 1950s.

Upon his death in 1998, Hoff was survived by two daughters; four grandchildren; six great-grandchildren; and one great-great-grandchild. He was predeceased by his wife, Eva, who died in 1934 at age 42.

== See also ==
- List of centenarians (Major League Baseball players)
- List of centenarians (sportspeople)

Records
| Preceded by Bill Otis | Oldest recognized verified living baseball player December 15, 1990 – September 17, 1998 | Succeeded by Ike Kahdot |
