= Pat Maloney =

American baseball player (1888-1979)

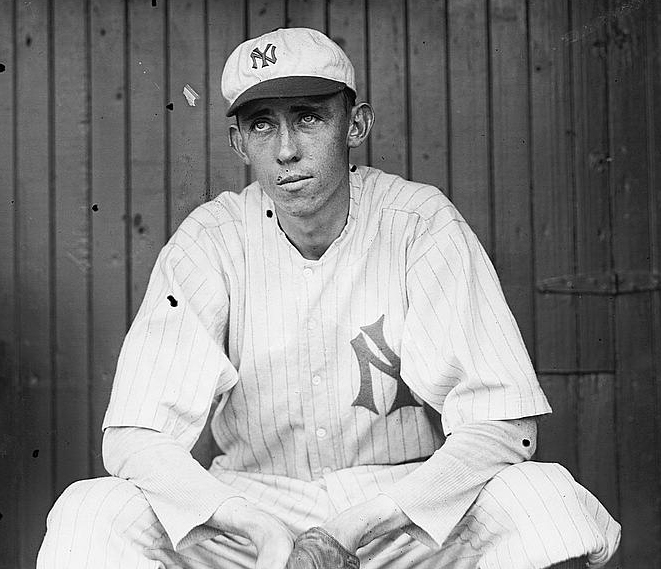
- Outfielder
- Born: January 19, 1888; Grosvenordale, Connecticut, U.S.
- Died: June 27, 1979 (aged 91); Pawtucket, Rhode Island, U.S.
- Batted: Right Threw: Right

MLB debut
- June 19, 1912, for the New York Highlanders

Last MLB appearance
- August 5, 1912, for the New York Highlanders

MLB statistics
- Hits: 17
- Batting average: .215
- RBI: 4
- Stats at Baseball Reference

Teams
- New York Highlanders (1912)

Patrick William Maloney (January 19, 1888 – June 27, 1979) was an American Major League Baseball outfielder. Maloney played for the New York Highlanders in 1912. In 25 career games, he had a .215 batting average with 17 hits in 79 at-bats. He batted and threw right-handed.

Maloney was born in Grosvenordale, Connecticut, and died in Pawtucket, Rhode Island.
