= Johnny Priest =

American baseball player (1891-1979)

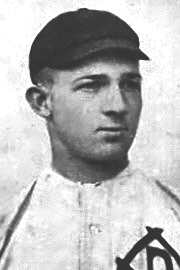
- Second baseman
- Born: June 23, 1891; St. Joseph, Missouri, U.S.
- Died: November 4, 1979 (aged 88); Washington, D.C., U.S.
- Batted: Right Threw: Right

MLB debut
- May 30, 1911, for the New York Highlanders

Last MLB appearance
- September 7, 1912, for the New York Highlanders

MLB statistics
- Batting average: .174
- Home runs: 0
- Runs batted in: 3
- Stats at Baseball Reference

Teams
- New York Highlanders (1911–1912)

John Gooding Priest (June 23, 1891 – November 4, 1979) was an American Major League Baseball infielder. He played in 10 games for the New York Highlanders over two seasons (1911 and 1912), five of them at second base. During his playing days, Priest held a job of appointment clerk for the United States Department of Agriculture. He received permission from James Wilson to take a leave of absence for playing the C-level Virginia League for the Danville Red Sox in 1910. In 1915, he coached baseball at Gallaudet College.
