= Bert Daniels =

American baseball player (1882–1958)

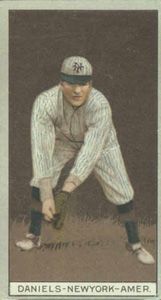
- Outfielder
- Born: October 31, 1882; Danville, Illinois, U.S.
- Died: June 6, 1958 (aged 75); Cedar Grove, New Jersey, U.S.
- Batted: Right Threw: Right

MLB debut
- June 25, 1910, for the New York Highlanders

Last MLB appearance
- October 5, 1914, for the Cincinnati Reds

MLB statistics
- Batting average: .255
- Home runs: 5
- Runs batted in: 130
- Stolen bases: 159
- Stats at Baseball Reference

Teams
- New York Highlanders/Yankees (1910–1913); Cincinnati Reds (1914)

Bernard Elmer Daniels (October 31, 1882 – June 6, 1958) was an American Major League Baseball player from 1910 to 1914.

Daniels' first four years were with the New York club in the American League, called the Highlanders through 1912, and the Yankees from 1913 onward. Daniels played well the first three seasons, hitting .253, .286, and .274. However, in 1913 his batting average dropped to .216, and Daniels was traded to the Cincinnati Reds of the National League, where he also hit poorly (.219) during the 1914 season. In 1915, he played for the minor league Baltimore Orioles in the International League. From 1916 through 1918, he played for the Louisville Colonels in the American Association.

Daniels served as head coach of the Manhattan Jaspers baseball team from 1931 to 1938, amassing a record of 93–38–1. He ranks fourth all-time in wins on the Jaspers list.

After his baseball career, Daniels lived in Nutley, New Jersey and served as an area building inspector. He moved to Cedar Grove in 1945. Daniels suffered a fatal heart attack on June 6, 1958.

== See also ==
- List of Major League Baseball career stolen bases leaders
- List of Major League Baseball players to hit for the cycle

Achievements
Preceded by Chief Meyers	Hitting for the cycle July 25, 1912	Succeeded by Honus Wagner
