= Tommy McMillan (baseball) =

American baseball player (1888–1966)

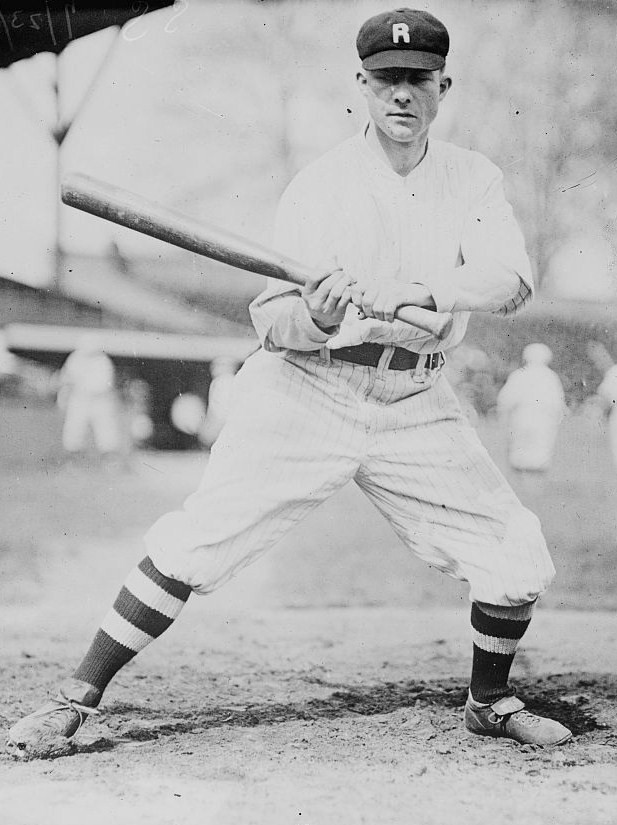
- Shortstop
- Born: April 18, 1888; Pittston, Pennsylvania, U.S.
- Died: July 15, 1966 (aged 78); Orlando, Florida, U.S.
- Batted: Right Threw: Right

MLB debut
- August 19, 1908, for the Brooklyn Superbas

Last MLB appearance
- October 5, 1912, for the New York Highlanders

MLB statistics
- Batting average: .209
- Home runs: 0
- Runs batted in: 54
- Stats at Baseball Reference

Teams
- Brooklyn Superbas (1908–1910); Cincinnati Reds (1910); New York Highlanders (1912)

Thomas Law McMillan (April 18, 1888 – July 15, 1966), nicknamed Rebel, was an American professional baseball shortstop. He played five seasons in Major League Baseball (MLB) from 1908 to 1912 for the Brooklyn Superbas, Cincinnati Reds, and New York Highlanders. He is an alumnus of Georgia Institute of Technology.

McMillan made his MLB debut with the Brooklyn Superbas (who later became the Brooklyn Dodgers) on August 19, 1908, and appear in his final game on October 5, 1912.

== Sources ==
- Page at Baseball Reference
