= Dutch Sterrett =

American baseball player (1889-1965)

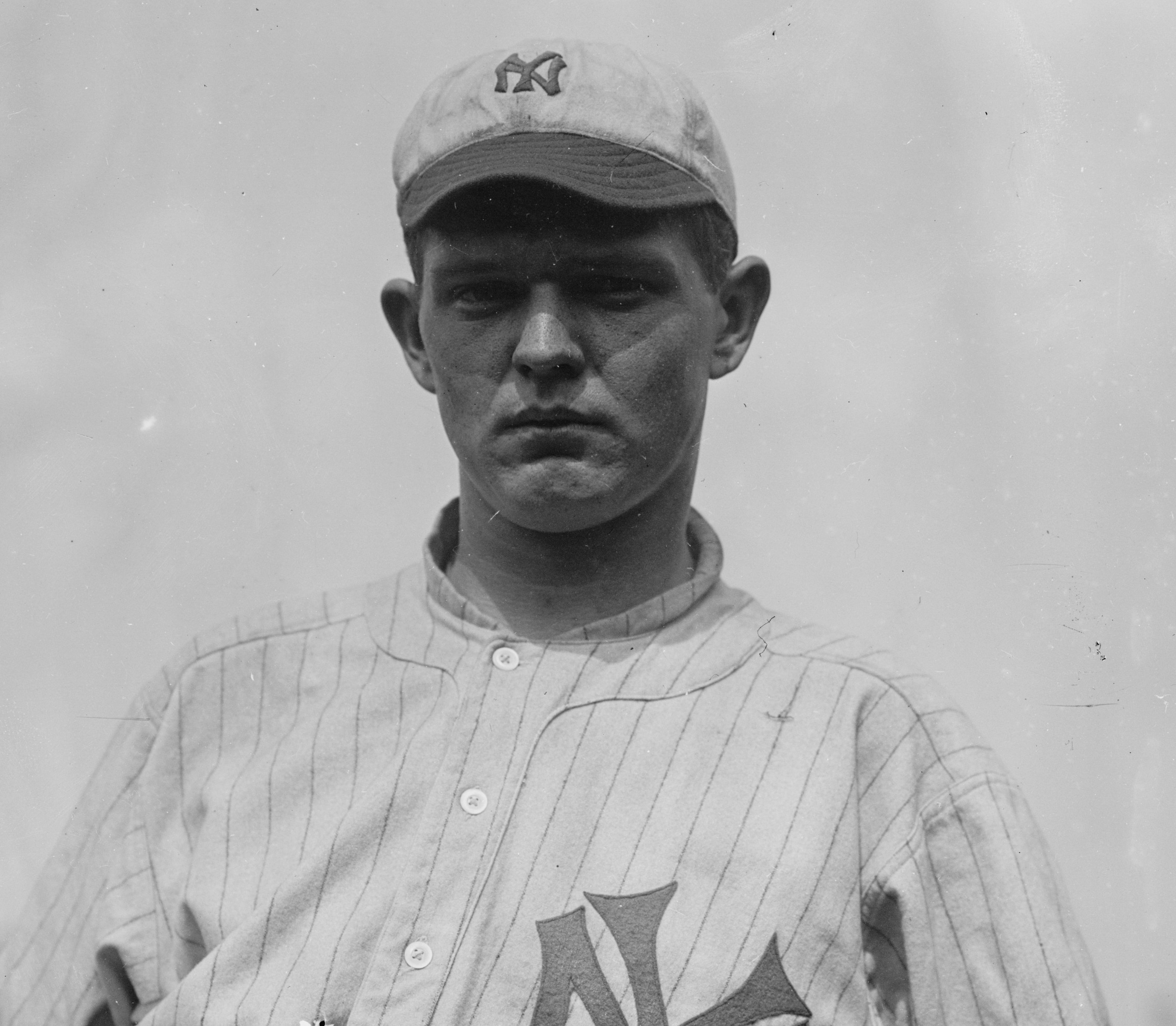
- Outfielder / Infielder
- Born: October 1, 1889; Milroy, Pennsylvania, U.S.
- Died: December 8, 1965 (aged 76); Baltimore, Maryland, U.S.
- Batted: Right Threw: Right

MLB debut
- June 20, 1912, for the New York Highlanders

Last MLB appearance
- June 17, 1913, for the New York Yankees

MLB statistics
- Batting average: .253
- Home runs: 1
- Runs batted in: 35
- Stats at Baseball Reference

Teams
- New York Highlanders/Yankees (1912–1913)

Charles Hurlbut "Dutch" Sterrett (October 1, 1889 – December 8, 1965) was an American professional baseball player who played two seasons for the New York Yankees of Major League Baseball. Sterrett posted a .253 batting average for his major league career, seeing action mostly in the outfield, at first base, and as a catcher. Sterrett also played part of a season for the Venice Tigers of the Pacific Coast League, hitting .299 in thirty-five games.

Sterrett played college baseball at Princeton University.

== Sources ==
- Career statistics from Baseball Reference · Baseball Reference (Minors) · Retrosheet · Baseball Almanac
