= Iron Davis =

American baseball player (1890–1961)

George Davis
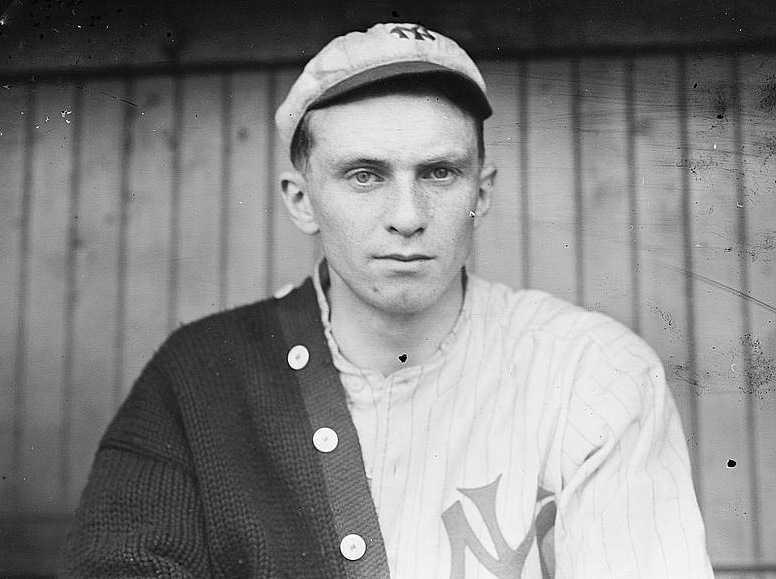
- Davis in 1912
- Pitcher
- Born: March 9, 1890; Lancaster, New York, U.S.
- Died: June 4, 1961 (aged 71); Buffalo, New York, U.S.
- Batted: Switch Threw: Right

MLB debut
- July 16, 1912, for the New York Highlanders

Last MLB appearance
- October 7, 1915, for the Boston Braves

MLB statistics
- Win–loss record: 7-10
- Earned run average: 4.48
- Strikeouts: 77
- Stats at Baseball Reference

Teams
- New York Highlanders (1912); Boston Braves (1913–1915)

Career highlights and awards
- Pitched a no-hitter on September 9, 1914
Member-at-large of the Buffalo Common Council
In office 1928–1934
Personal details
| Party | Republican |

George Allen "Iron" Davis Jr. (March 9, 1890 – June 4, 1961) was an American professional baseball pitcher. He played all or part of four seasons in Major League Baseball from 1912 to 1915. He played for the Boston Braves and New York Highlanders.

== College ==
When Davis arrived at Williams College, he had never played baseball and he did not seem athletic enough for it. "His strength was confined to his brains and he had the physique of an Oliver Twist," wrote Ring Lardner. Davis neglected his studies in his freshman year because he was working out in the gymnasium and teaching himself to throw a baseball. When Williams coach Billy Lauder saw Davis in the gym one day, he allowed Davis to join the baseball team. He received attention from several major league scouts, and he signed with the New York Highlanders in 1912.

== Major league career ==
Davis pursued studies at Harvard Law School while he was a major league pitcher. He won only seven career major league games, but one of those games was a no-hitter; he threw the no-hit game for Boston's World Series-winning "Miracle Braves" team of 1914 on September 9 of that year, against the Philadelphia Phillies.

From 1918 to 1919, Davis served in the U.S. Army. After his military service, he settled in Buffalo, New York, and took philosophy, comparative religion, and astronomy classes at University at Buffalo. For thirty years he conducted astronomy classes at the Buffalo Museum of Science, where he was also a trustee.

Davis was married to Georgiana "Kiddo" Jones, and they had four children. One of Kiddo's granddaughters said that she had been a suffragette and "the first in her circle to raise her skirts above the ankle."

== Political career ==
From 1928 to 1934, Davis was a member-at-large of the Buffalo Common Council, and he unsuccessfully sought the Republican nomination for mayor in 1934. He practiced law under a family firm before joining what would become Hodgson Russ law firm.

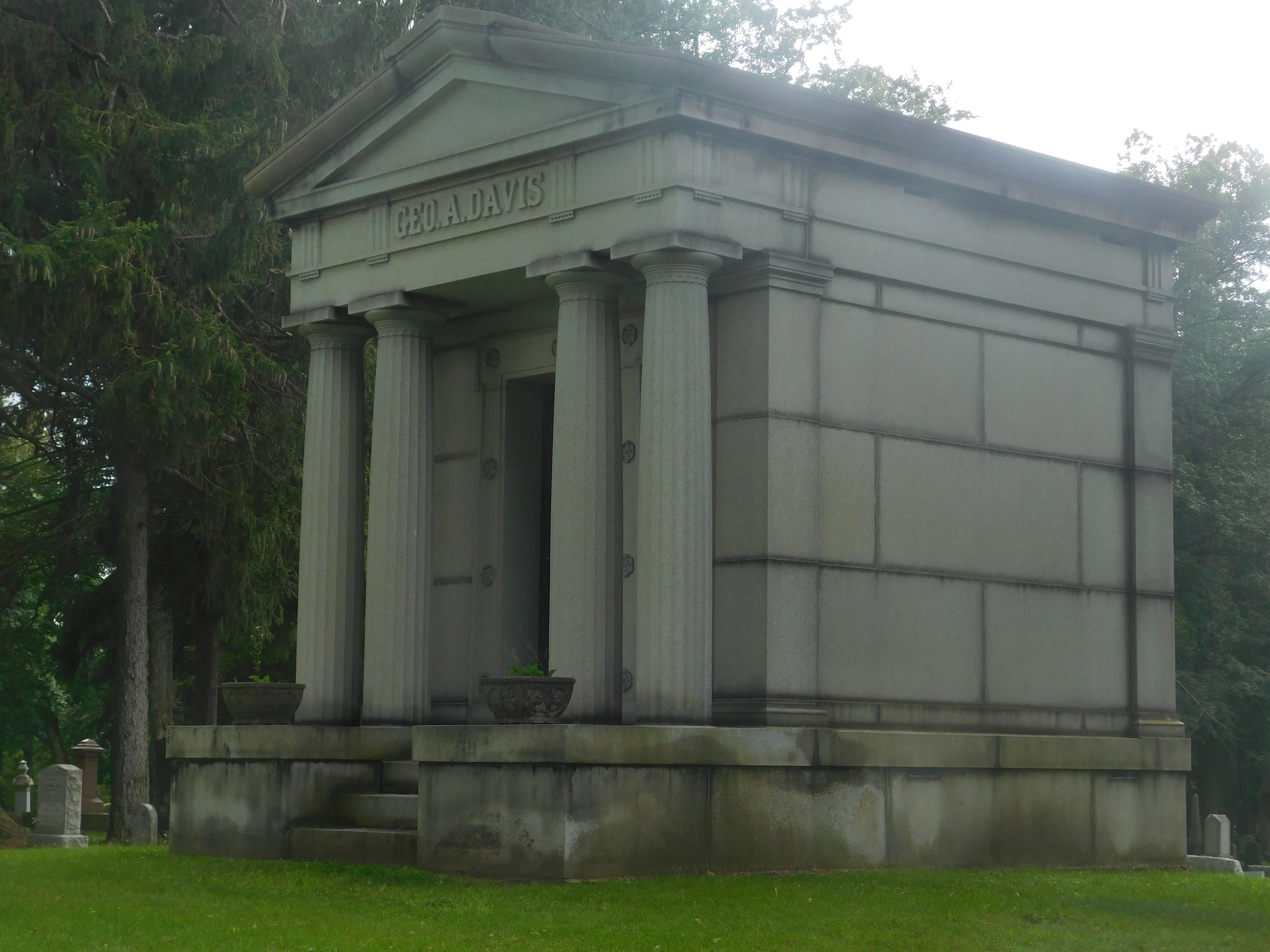
The mausoleum of Davis in Lancaster, New York

== Death ==
Davis hanged himself in Buffalo on June 4, 1961.

== See also ==
- List of Major League Baseball no-hitters

Awards and achievements
| Preceded by Joe Benz | No-hitter pitcher September 9, 1914 | Succeeded by Ed Lafitte |
