= Monday, Ohio =

Unincorporated community in Ohio, U.S.

Coordinates: 39°29′32″N 82°12′39″W

Monday is an unincorporated community in Hocking County, in the U.S. state of Ohio.

== History ==
A post office called Monday was established in 1880, and remained in operation until 1914. The community took its name from Monday Creek. In 1883, Monday had a population of approximately 400 residents.
