= Homer Thompson (baseball) =

American baseball player (1891-1957)

- Catcher
- Born: June 1, 1891; Spring City, Tennessee, U.S.
- Died: September 12, 1957 (aged 66); Atlanta, Georgia, U.S.
- Batted: Right Threw: Right

MLB debut
- October 5, 1912, for the New York Highlanders

Last MLB appearance
- October 5, 1912, for the New York Highlanders

MLB statistics
- Games played: 1
- At bats: 0
- Hits: 0
- Stats at Baseball Reference

Teams
- New York Highlanders (1912)

Homer Thomas Thompson (June 1, 1891 – September 12, 1957) was an American catcher in Major League Baseball who made one game appearance for the New York Highlanders in its 1912 season. Thompson batted and threw right-handed. He was born in Spring City, Tennessee and died in Atlanta, Georgia.

Thompson attended the University of Georgia. He was the younger brother of another Highlander, Tommy Thompson.
