= Bill Stumpf (baseball) =

American baseball player (1892–1966)

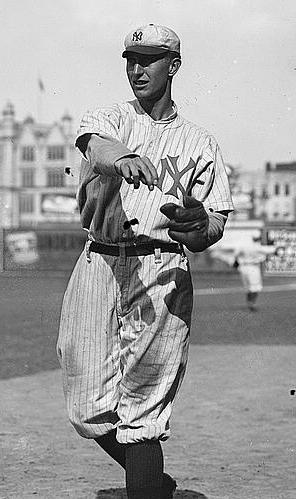
- Infielder
- Born: March 21, 1892; Baltimore, Maryland, US
- Died: February 14, 1966 (aged 73); Crownsville, Maryland, US
- Batted: Right Threw: Right

MLB debut
- May 11, 1912, for the New York Yankees

Last MLB appearance
- May 21, 1913, for the New York Yankees

MLB statistics
- Batting average: .234
- Home runs: 0
- Runs batted in: 11
- Stats at Baseball Reference

Teams
- New York Yankees (1912–1913)

William Frederick Stumpf (March 21, 1892 – February 14, 1966) was an American professional baseball infielder who played in Major League Baseball for two seasons for the New York Yankees and subsequently spent several years in the minor leagues. Stumpf was 6 feet (1.8 m) tall and weighed 175 pounds (79 kg).

== Career ==
Stumpf was born in Baltimore, Maryland, in 1892. He started his professional baseball career in 1912 with the American League's New York Yankees. That season, he appeared in 42 games, mostly at shortstop, and had a batting average of .240. The following year, he batted .207 in 12 games before being traded to the Cleveland Naps in May. Stumpf never played in the majors again. He finished the 1913 season with the American Association's Toledo Mud Hens.

After one more campaign in the American Association, Stumpf played for the Pacific Coast League's Portland Beavers in 1915 and 1916. In 1916, he appeared in only 75 games and spent most of the season in hospital with a knee injury. It was uncertain whether he would be able to continue playing baseball afterwards. However, Stumpf did return to the game in 1917. He played in the Pacific Coast League and the Northwestern League and led the Northwestern League with a .405 batting average.

Stumpf was then acquired by the National League's Pittsburgh Pirates. He was unable to earn a roster spot with the team, however, and was given his release in April 1918. He did not play in professional baseball that year. The following season, Stumpf was back in the Pacific Coast League, where he played until 1923. His career ended in the Texas League in 1925.

During his 12-year professional baseball career, Stumpf collected 1,477 hits (37 in the major leagues and 1,440 in the minor leagues). He died in Crownsville, Maryland, in 1966.
