= Bill Otis =

American baseball player (1889-1990)

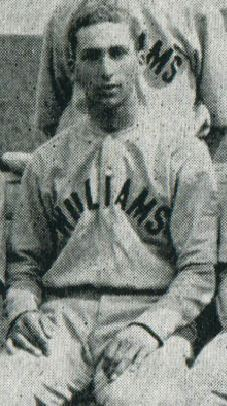
- Outfielder
- Born: December 24, 1889; Scituate, Massachusetts, U.S.
- Died: December 15, 1990 (aged 100); Duluth, Minnesota, U.S.
- Batted: Left Threw: Right

MLB debut
- July 4, 1912, for the New York Highlanders

Last MLB appearance
- July 6, 1912, for the New York Highlanders

MLB statistics
- Batting average: .059
- Home runs: 0
- Runs batted in: 2
- Stats at Baseball Reference

Teams
- New York Highlanders (1912)

Paul Franklin "Bill" Otis (December 24, 1889 – December 15, 1990) was an American Major League Baseball player. Otis played for the New York Highlanders in the 1912 season. He was born in Scituate, Massachusetts, and died in Duluth, Minnesota. At the time of his death, he was the oldest living former major league player.

== See also ==
- List of centenarians (Major League Baseball players)
- List of centenarians (sportspeople)

Records
Preceded by John Daley	Oldest recognized verified living baseball player August 31, 1988 – December 15, 1990	Succeeded by Red Hoff
