= Curtis Coleman =

American baseball player (1887-1980)

Curt Coleman
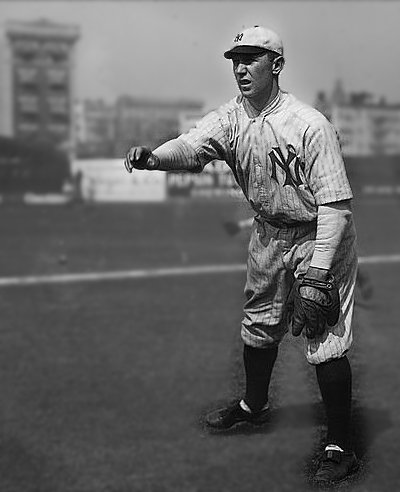
- Third baseman
- Born: February 18, 1887; Salem, Oregon
- Died: July 1, 1980 (aged 93); Newport, Oregon
- Batted: Left Threw: Right

MLB debut
- April 13, 1912, for the New York Highlanders

Last MLB appearance
- June 1, 1912, for the New York Highlanders

MLB statistics
- Batting average: .243
- Home runs: 0
- Runs batted in: 4
- Stats at Baseball Reference

Teams
- New York Highlanders (1912)

Curtis Hancock "Curt" Coleman (February 18, 1887 – July 1, 1980) was a Major League Baseball player. Coleman played third base for the New York Highlanders in 1912. He played in 12 games, with nine hits in 37 at-bats, with four RBIs. He had a batting average of .243.

Coleman was the first major leaguer to come from the University of Oregon.

During the 1912 season, the Highlanders reassigned Coleman to an Atlanta minor league team but Coleman refused to report; given that he already owned a productive farm in the Willamette Valley, he was not reliant on baseball to earn a living and had actually been considering retiring even before the 1911 season. It was not until the 1915 season that the Highlanders granted him a release from his contract, allowing him to play professional baseball again.

Following the 1915 season, Coleman married Irene Gearin, niece of John M. Gearin, and retired to his farm in St. Paul, Oregon. His parents also owned a fruit and grain ranch in the Willamette Valley.

He was born in Salem, Oregon and died in Newport, Oregon.
