= Tommy Thompson (pitcher) =

American baseball player

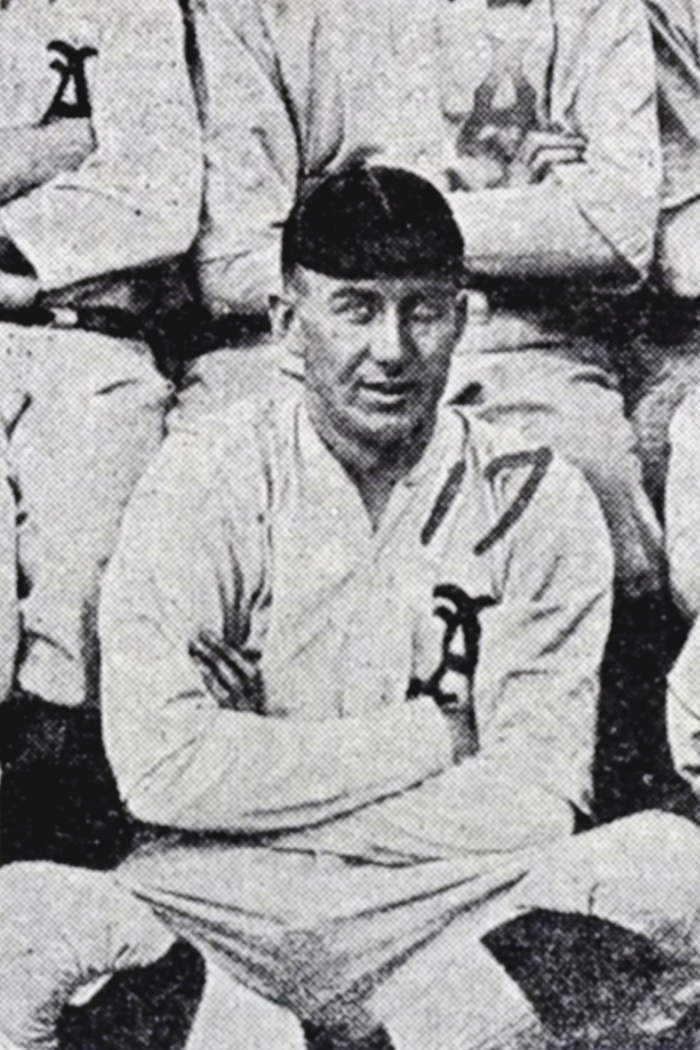
- Pitcher
- Born: November 7, 1889; Spring City, Tennessee, U.S.
- Died: January 16, 1963 (aged 73); LaJolla, California, U.S.
- Batted: Right Threw: Right

MLB debut
- June 5, 1912, for the New York Highlanders

Last MLB appearance
- October 5, 1912, for the New York Highlanders

MLB statistics
- Win–loss record: 0–2
- Earned run average: 6.06
- Strikeouts: 15
- Stats at Baseball Reference

Teams
- New York Highlanders (1912)

Thomas Carl Thompson (November 7, 1889 – January 16, 1963) was an American Major League Baseball pitcher. Thompson played for the New York Highlanders in the 1912 baseball season. In seven career games, he had a 0–2 record, with a 6.06 ERA. He batted and threw right-handed. Thompson was born in Spring City, Tennessee and died in LaJolla, California.

He was the elder brother of Homer Thompson, who played in one game for the Highlanders in 1912.
