= John Dowd (baseball) =

American baseball player (1891-1981)

- Shortstop
- Born: January 3, 1891; Weymouth, Massachusetts, U.S.
- Died: January 31, 1981 (aged 90); Fort Lauderdale, Florida, U.S.
- Batted: Right Threw: Right

MLB debut
- July 3, 1912, for the New York Highlanders

Last MLB appearance
- July 13, 1912, for the New York Highlanders

MLB statistics
- Batting average: .194
- Home runs: 0
- Runs batted in: 0
- Stats at Baseball Reference

Teams
- New York Highlanders (1912)

John Leo Dowd (born John Leo O'Dowd from January 3, 1891, to January 31, 1981) was an American Major League Baseball shortstop. He played for the New York Highlanders in 1912. In 10 career games, he had a .194 batting average, with six hits in 31 at-bats. He batted and threw right-handed.

Dowd was born in Weymouth, Massachusetts, and died in Fort Lauderdale, Florida.
