= 1913 New York Yankees season =

Season for the Major League Baseball team the New York Yankees

1913 New York Yankees
- League: American League
- Ballpark: Polo Grounds
- City: New York City, New York
- Record: 57–94 (.377)
- League place: 7th
- Owners: William Devery and Frank Farrell
- Managers: Frank Chance

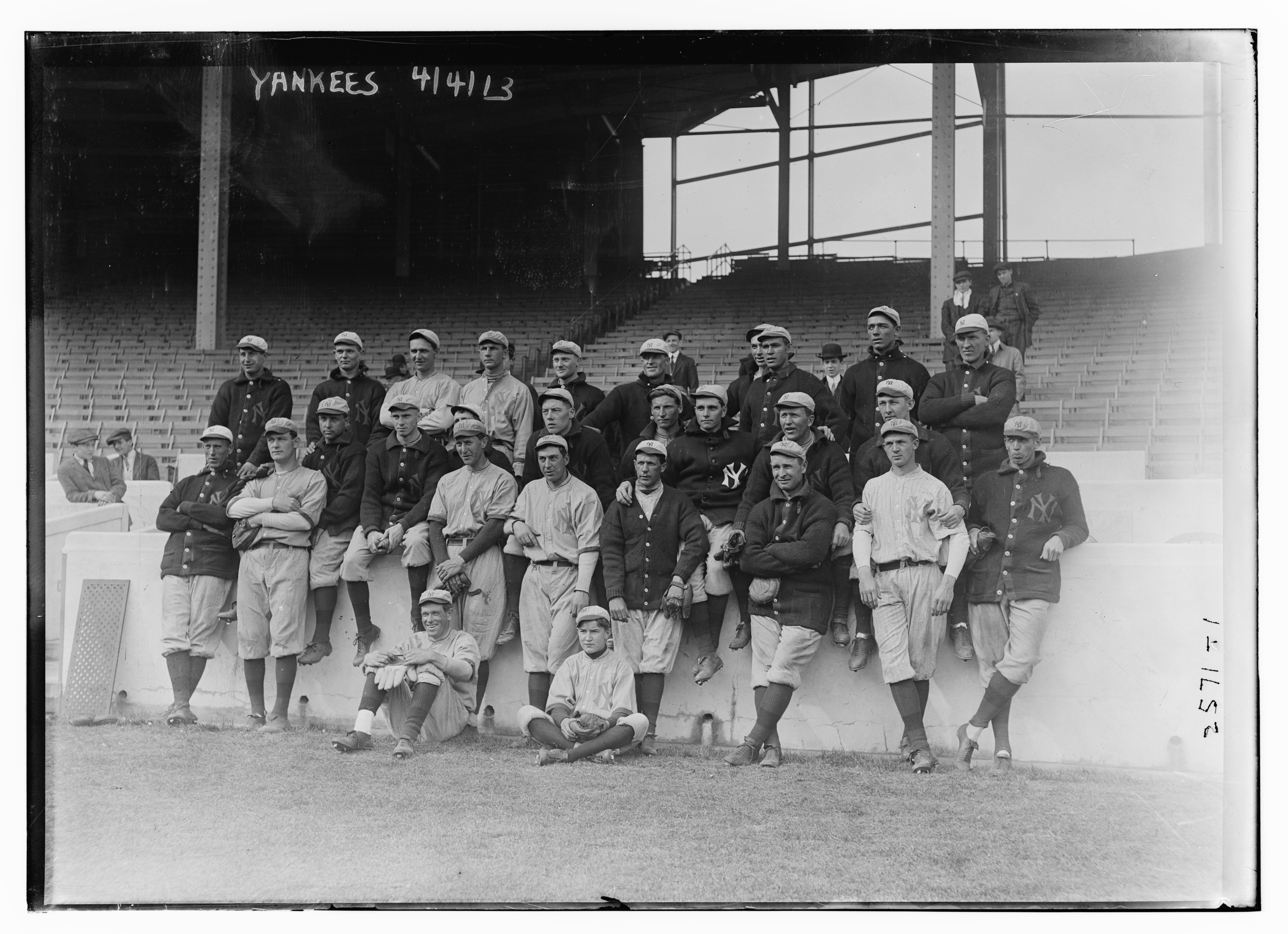
The 1913 New York Yankees

The 1913 New York Yankees season was the club's eleventh. This was their first season exclusively using the "Yankees" name. The team finished with a record of 57–94, coming in seventh place in the American League. The team also moved into the Polo Grounds which they would share with the New York Giants until 1923.

== Offseason ==
- December 20, 1912: Del Paddock was purchased from the Yankees by the Rochester Hustlers.
- December 1912: Guy Zinn was purchased from the Yankees by the Boston Braves.

== Regular season ==
=== Season summary ===
With an otherwise lackluster season, the most noteworthy event for the 1913 Yankees was switching their home field from Hilltop Park to the Polo Grounds. The Yankees had lent their home to the National League's Giants during the rebuilding of the Polo Grounds following its disastrous fire in 1911. The Giants returned the favor in 1913, subleasing to their American League rivals after the Highlanders' agreement to play at the aging, and wooden, Hilltop ballpark had ended.

At that time, the Giants were one of the strongest teams in baseball, winners of two consecutive league championships, and they would win their third in a row in 1913. The Yankees were seen as no threat to their status, and would provide additional revenue. Little did the Giants suspect what the future held for the respective clubs' status in the city and in baseball.

=== Team name ===
The nickname "Yankees" was now in frequent popular usage, and with the move of just a few blocks from the Hilltop to the bottomland of Coogan's Hollow next to the Harlem River, the alternate nickname "Highlanders" no longer made logical sense, and was dropped. Thus "Yankees" became the exclusive nickname of the New York American League franchise.

=== Season standings ===
American League
Team	W	L	Pct.	GB	Home	Road
Philadelphia Athletics	96	57	.627	—	50‍–‍26	46‍–‍31
Washington Senators	90	64	.584	6½	42‍–‍35	48‍–‍29
Cleveland Naps	86	66	.566	9½	45‍–‍32	41‍–‍34
Boston Red Sox	79	71	.527	15½	41‍–‍34	38‍–‍37
Chicago White Sox	78	74	.513	17½	40‍–‍37	38‍–‍37
Detroit Tigers	66	87	.431	30	34‍–‍42	32‍–‍45
New York Yankees	57	94	.377	38	27‍–‍47	30‍–‍47
St. Louis Browns	57	96	.373	39	31‍–‍46	26‍–‍50

=== Record vs. opponents ===
1913 American League record Sources:
Team	BOS	CWS	CLE	DET	NYY	PHA	SLB	WSH
Boston	—	10–11	8–13	13–9	14–6–1	11–11	17–5	6–16
Chicago	11–10	—	9–13–1	13–9	11–10	11–11	12–10	11–11
Cleveland	13–8	13–9–1	—	14–7	14–8–1	9–13	16–6–1	7–15
Detroit	9–13	9–13	7–14	—	11–11	7–15	11–11	12–10
New York	6–14–1	10–11	8–14–1	11–11	—	5–17	11–11	6–16
Philadelphia	11–11	11–11	13–9	15–7	17–5	—	15–6	14–8
St. Louis	5–17	10–12	6–16–1	11–11	11–11	6–15	—	8–14–1
Washington	16–6	11–11	15–7	10–12	16–6	8–14	14–8–1	—

=== Roster ===
1913 New York Yankees
Roster
Pitchers: Ray Caldwell; George Clark; Ray Fisher; Russ Ford; Jim Hanley; Chet Hoff; Ray Keating; Ed Klepfer; George McConnell; Marty McHale; Cy Pieh; Al Schulz; Jack Warhop	Catchers: Dick Gossett; Harry Hanson; Bill Reynolds; Joe Smith; Ed Sweeney; Bob Williams; Infielders: Lute Boone; Babe Borton; Frank Chance; Hal Chase; Claud Derrick; Roy Hartzell; John Knight; Fritz Maisel; Bill McKechnie; Ezra Midkiff; Roger Peckinpaugh; Dutch Sterrett; Bill Stumpf; Harry Williams; Ralph Young; Rollie Zeider	Outfielders: Doc Cook; Birdie Cree; Bert Daniels; Frank Gilhooley; Bill Holden; Jack Lelivelt; George Whiteman; Harry Wolter; Other batters: Dan Costello	Manager: Frank Chance

== Player stats ==
=== Batting ===
==== Starters by position ====
Note: Pos = Position; G = Games played; AB = At bats; H = Hits; Avg. = Batting average; HR = Home runs; RBI = Runs batted in

Pos	Player	G	AB	H	Avg.	HR	RBI
C	Ed Sweeney	117	351	93	.265	2	40
1B	John Knight	70	250	59	.236	0	24
2B	Roy Hartzell	141	490	127	.259	0	38
SS	Roger Peckinpaugh	95	340	91	.268	1	32
3B	Ezra Midkiff	83	284	56	.197	0	14
OF	Birdie Cree	145	534	145	.272	1	63
OF	Bert Daniels	94	320	69	.216	0	22
OF	Harry Wolter	127	425	108	.254	2	43

==== Other batters ====
Note: G = Games played; AB = At bats; H = Hits; Avg. = Batting average; HR = Home runs; RBI = Runs batted in

Player	G	AB	H	Avg.	HR	RBI
Fritz Maisel	51	187	48	.257	0	12
Rollie Zeider	50	159	37	.233	0	12
Hal Chase	39	146	31	.212	0	9
Bill McKechnie	45	112	15	.134	0	8
Babe Borton	33	108	14	.130	0	11
Dick Gossett	39	105	17	.162	0	9
Frank Gilhooley	24	85	29	.341	0	14
Harry Williams	27	82	21	.256	1	12
Doc Cook	20	72	19	.264	0	1
Claud Derrick	23	65	19	.292	1	7
Bill Holden	18	53	16	.302	0	8
Dutch Sterrett	21	35	6	.171	0	3
George Whiteman	11	32	11	.344	0	2
Joe Smith	14	32	5	.156	0	2
Bill Stumpf	12	29	6	.207	0	1
Jack Lelivelt	18	28	6	.214	0	4
Frank Chance	12	24	5	.208	0	6
Bob Williams	6	19	3	.158	0	0
Ralph Young	7	15	1	.067	0	0
Luke Boone	6	12	4	.333	0	1
Bill Reynolds	5	5	0	.000	0	0
Harry Hanson	1	2	0	.000	0	0
Dan Costello	2	2	1	.500	0	0

=== Pitching ===
==== Starting pitchers ====
Note: G = Games pitched; IP = Innings pitched; W = Wins; L = Losses; ERA = Earned run average; SO = Strikeouts

Player	G	IP	W	L	ERA	SO
Ray Fisher	43	246.1	12	16	3.18	92
Russ Ford	33	237.0	13	18	2.66	72
Ray Keating	28	151.1	6	12	3.21	83
Marty McHale	7	48.2	2	4	2.96	11

==== Other pitchers ====
Note: G = Games pitched; IP = Innings pitched; W = Wins; L = Losses; ERA = Earned run average; SO = Strikeouts

Player	G	IP	W	L	ERA	SO
Al Schulz	38	193.0	7	14	3.73	77
George McConnell	35	180.0	4	15	3.20	72
Ray Caldwell	27	164.1	9	8	2.41	87
Jack Warhop	15	62.1	3	5	3.75	11
Ed Klepfer	8	24.2	0	1	7.66	10

==== Relief pitchers ====
Note: G = Games pitched; W = Wins; L = Losses; SV = Saves; ERA = Earned run average; SO = Strikeouts

Player	G	W	L	SV	ERA	SO
George Clark	11	0	1	0	9.00	5
Cy Pieh	4	1	0	0	4.35	6
Red Hoff	2	0	0	0	0.00	2
Jim Hanley	1	0	0	0	6.75	2
