= 1914 New York Yankees season =

Season for the Major League Baseball team the New York Yankees

1914 New York Yankees
- League: American League
- Ballpark: Polo Grounds
- City: New York City, New York
- Record: 70–84 (.455)
- League place: T–6th
- Owners: William Devery and Frank Farrell
- Managers: Frank Chance and Roger Peckinpaugh

The 1914 New York Yankees season was the club's twelfth. The team finished with a record of 70–84, coming in a tie for sixth place in the American League.

== Regular season ==
=== Season standings ===
American League
Team	W	L	Pct.	GB	Home	Road
Philadelphia Athletics	99	53	.651	—	51‍–‍24	48‍–‍29
Boston Red Sox	91	62	.595	8½	44‍–‍31	47‍–‍31
Washington Senators	81	73	.526	19	40‍–‍33	41‍–‍40
Detroit Tigers	80	73	.523	19½	42‍–‍35	38‍–‍38
St. Louis Browns	71	82	.464	28½	42‍–‍36	29‍–‍46
Chicago White Sox	70	84	.455	30	43‍–‍37	27‍–‍47
New York Yankees	70	84	.455	30	36‍–‍40	34‍–‍44
Cleveland Naps	51	102	.333	48½	32‍–‍47	19‍–‍55

=== Record vs. opponents ===
1914 American League record Sources:
Team	BOS	CWS	CLE	DET	NYH	PHA	SLB	WSH
Boston	—	13–9	16–6	15–7–1	11–11	12–9–3	13–9–2	11–11
Chicago	9–13	—	13–9	6–16	12–10–1	5–17	13–9–1	12–10–1
Cleveland	6–16	9–13	—	6–16	8–14–1	3–19	8–13–2	11–11–1
Detroit	7–15–1	16–6	16–6	—	13–9–1	9–12–1	9–13	10–12–1
New York	11–11	10–12–1	14–8–1	9–13–1	—	8–14	11–11	7–15
Philadelphia	9–12–3	17–5	19–3	12–9–1	14–8	—	15–7–1	13–9–1
St. Louis	9–13–2	9–13–1	13–8–2	13–9	11–11	7–15–1	—	9–13
Washington	11–11	10–12–1	11–11–1	12–10–1	15–7	9–13–1	13–9	—

=== Roster ===
1914 New York Yankees
Roster
Pitchers: Boardwalk Brown; Ray Caldwell; King Cole; Guy Cooper; Ray Fisher; Ray Keating; Marty McHale; Cy Pieh; Al Schulz; Jack Warhop	Catchers: Dick Gossett; Les Nunamaker; Bill Reynolds; Jay Rogers; Pius Schwert; Ed Sweeney; Infielders: Lute Boone; Frank Chance; Joe Harris; Harry Kingman; Fritz Maisel; Charlie Mullen; Roger Peckinpaugh; Frank Truesdale; Harry Williams	Outfielders: Ángel Aragón; Alex Burr; Doc Cook; Birdie Cree; Tom Daley; Roy Hartzell; Bill Holden; Charlie Meara; Jimmy Walsh; Other batters: Les Channell	Manager: Frank Chance; Roger Peckinpaugh; Coaches: Tom Daly

== Player stats ==
=== Batting ===
==== Starters by position ====
Note: Pos = Position; G = Games played; AB = At bats; H = Hits; Avg. = Batting average; HR = Home runs; RBI = Runs batted in

Pos	Player	G	AB	H	Avg.	HR	RBI
C	Ed Sweeney	87	258	55	.213	1	22
1B	Charlie Mullen	93	323	84	.260	0	44
2B	Lute Boone	106	370	82	.222	0	21
SS	Roger Peckinpaugh	157	570	127	.223	3	51
3B	Fritz Maisel	150	548	131	.239	2	47
OF	Roy Hartzell	137	481	112	.233	1	32
OF	Birdie Cree	77	275	85	.309	0	40
OF	Doc Cook	132	470	133	.283	1	40

==== Other batters ====
Note: G = Games played; AB = At bats; H = Hits; Avg. = Batting average; HR = Home runs; RBI = Runs batted in

Player	G	AB	H	Avg.	HR	RBI
Les Nunamaker	87	257	68	.265	2	29
Frank Truesdale	77	217	46	.212	0	13
Tom Daley	69	191	48	.251	0	9
Harry Williams	59	178	29	.163	1	17
Bill Holden	50	165	30	.182	0	12
Jimmy Walsh	43	136	26	.191	1	11
Dick Gossett	10	21	3	.143	0	1
Jay Rogers	5	8	0	.000	0	0
Ángel Aragón	6	7	1	.143	0	0
Charlie Meara	4	7	2	.286	0	1
Pi Schwert	3	6	0	.000	0	0
Bill Reynolds	4	5	2	.400	0	0
Frank Gilhooley	1	3	2	.667	0	0
Harry Kingman	4	3	0	.000	0	0
Joe Harris	2	1	0	.000	0	0
Les Channell	1	1	1	1.000	0	0
Frank Chance	1	0	0	----	0	0
Tom Burr	1	0	0	----	0	0

=== Pitching ===
==== Starting pitchers ====
Note: G = Games pitched; IP = Innings pitched; W = Wins; L = Losses; ERA = Earned run average; SO = Strikeouts

Player	G	IP	W	L	ERA	SO
Ray Caldwell	31	213.0	18	9	1.94	92
Ray Keating	34	210.0	8	11	2.96	109
Ray Fisher	29	209.0	10	12	2.28	86
Marty McHale	31	191.0	6	16	2.97	75
Boardwalk Brown	20	122.1	6	5	3.24	57

==== Other pitchers ====
Note: G = Games pitched; IP = Innings pitched; W = Wins; L = Losses; ERA = Earned run average; SO = Strikeouts

Player	G	IP	W	L	ERA	SO
Jack Warhop	37	216.2	8	15	2.37	56
King Cole	33	141.2	10	9	3.30	43
Cy Pieh	18	62.1	3	4	5.05	24
Al Schulz	6	28.1	1	3	4.76	18

==== Relief pitchers ====
Note: G = Games pitched; W = Wins; L = Losses; SV = Saves; ERA = Earned run average; SO = Strikeouts

Player	G	W	L	SV	ERA	SO
Guy Cooper	1	0	0	0	9.00	3
