= List of Major League Baseball players (C) =

The following is a list of Major League Baseball players, retired or active. As of the end of the 2011 season, there have been 1,378 players with a last name that begins with C who have been on a major league roster at some point.

== C ==
- Enos Cabell
- Al Cabrera
- Alex Cabrera
- Asdrúbal Cabrera
- Daniel Cabrera
- Everth Cabrera
- Fernando Cabrera
- Francisco Cabrera
- Jolbert Cabrera
- José Cabrera
- Melky Cabrera
- Miguel Cabrera
- Orlando Cabrera
- Greg Cadaret
- Charlie Cady
- Hick Cady
- Wayne Cage
- Trevor Cahill
- Bob Cain
- Les Cain
- Lorenzo Cain
- Matt Cain
- Sugar Cain
- Cam Cairncross
- Miguel Cairo
- Iván Calderón
- Charlie Caldwell
- Earl Caldwell
- Mike Caldwell
- Ralph Caldwell
- Ray Caldwell
- Kiko Calero
- Jeff Calhoun
- Carmen Cali
- Fred Caligiuri
- Will Calihan
- Ben Callahan
- Joe Callahan
- John Callahan (pitcher)
- John Callahan (catcher)
- Nixey Callahan
- Alberto Callaspo
- Mickey Callaway
- Johnny Callison
- Ron Calloway
- Napoleón Calzado
- Ernie Camacho
- Kevin Cameron
- Mike Cameron
- Dolph Camilli
- Doug Camilli
- Ken Caminiti
- Eric Cammack
- Howie Camnitz
- Howie Camp
- Rick Camp
- Shawn Camp
- Tony Campana
- Roy Campanella β
- Bert Campaneris
- Al Campanis
- Jim Campanis
- Count Campau
- Archie Campbell
- Bill Campbell
- Bruce Campbell
- Dave Campbell (infielder)
- Dave Campbell (pitcher)
- Hugh Campbell
- Jim Campbell (catcher)
- Jim Campbell (pinch hitter)
- Jim Campbell (pitcher)
- Kevin Campbell
- Mike Campbell (first baseman)
- Mike Campbell (pitcher)
- Soup Campbell
- Cardell Camper
- Jorge Campillo
- Sil Campusano
- George Canale
- Robinson Cancel
- Casey Candaele
- Milo Candini
- Tom Candiotti
- John Cangelosi
- Jay Canizaro
- Andy Cannizaro
- Chris Cannizzaro
- Joe Cannon
- José Canó
- Robinson Canó
- José Canseco
- Ozzie Canseco
- Mike Cantwell
- Doug Capilla
- Matt Capps
- George Cappuzzello
- Buzz Capra
- Nick Capra
- Ralph Capron
- Bernie Carbo
- José Cardenal
- Leo Cárdenas
- Conrad Cardinal
- Don Cardwell
- Rod Carew
- Andy Carey
- Max Carey
- Paul Carey
- Tom Carey (shortstop)
- Tom Carey (second baseman)
- John Carl
- Jim Carleton
- Walter Carlisle
- Cisco Carlos
- Dan Carlson
- Hal Carlson
- Jesse Carlson
- Leon Carlson
- Swede Carlstrom
- Steve Carlton
- Buddy Carlyle
- Cleo Carlyle
- Roy Carlyle
- Don Carman
- Duke Carmel
- Fausto Carmona
- Rafael Carmona
- Eddie Carnett
- Pat Carney
- Bob Carpenter
- Bubba Carpenter
- Chris Carpenter
- Cris Carpenter
- Hick Carpenter
- Charlie Carr
- Chuck Carr
- Giovanni Carrara
- D. J. Carrasco
- Héctor Carrasco
- Alex Carrasquel
- Chico Carrasquel
- Cam Carreon
- Mark Carreon
- Bill Carrigan
- Don Carrithers
- Brett Carroll
- Chick Carroll
- Clay Carroll
- Cliff Carroll
- Dick Carroll
- Doc Carroll
- Ed Carroll
- Fred Carroll
- Jamey Carroll
- Ownie Carroll
- Pat Carroll
- Scrappy Carroll
- Tom Carroll
- Kid Carsey
- Matt Carson
- Kit Carson
- Andy Carter
- Arnold Carter
- Blackie Carter
- Gary Carter
- Joe Carter
- Lance Carter
- Sol Carter
- Ed Cartwright
- Rico Carty
- Scott Cary
- Jerry Casale
- Paul Casanova
- Raul Casanova
- Joe Cascarella
- Doc Casey
- Sean Casey
- Dave Cash
- Kevin Cash
- Norm Cash
- Ron Cash
- Craig Caskey
- Jack Cassel
- Joe Cassidy
- John Cassidy
- Pete Cassidy
- Scott Cassidy
- Pedro Castellano
- Jim Castiglia
- Vinny Castilla
- Alberto Castillo (catcher)
- Alberto Castillo (pitcher)
- Bobby Castillo
- Braulio Castillo
- Carlos Castillo
- Carmen Castillo
- Frank Castillo
- José Castillo
- Juan Castillo (second baseman)
- Juan Castillo (pitcher)
- Luis Castillo
- Manny Castillo
- Marty Castillo
- Tony Castillo (pitcher)
- Tony Castillo (catcher)
- Wilkin Castillo
- John Castino
- Don Castle
- Foster Castleman
- Roy Castleton
- Paul Castner
- Kory Casto
- Bernie Castro
- Bill Castro
- Fabio Castro
- Juan Castro
- Lou Castro
- Ramón Castro (catcher)
- Ramón Castro (third baseman)
- Frank Catalanotto
- Troy Cate
- Danny Cater
- John Cattanach
- Red Causey
- James Cavanagh
- Phil Cavarretta
- Andy Cavazos
- Rex Cecil
- Andújar Cedeño
- César Cedeño
- Domingo Cedeño
- Roger Cedeño
- Ronny Cedeño
- Orlando Cepeda
- Matt Cepicky
- Mike Cervenak
- Ron Cey
- Gustavo Chacín
- Elio Chacón
- Shawn Chacón
- Chet Chadbourne
- Leon Chagnon
- Bob Chakales
- Dave Chalk
- Elton Chamberlain
- Joba Chamberlain
- Wes Chamberlain
- Al Chambers
- Cliff Chambers
- Rome Chambers
- Chris Chambliss
- Mike Champion
- Bob Chance
- Frank Chance
- Spud Chandler
- Darrel Chaney
- Esty Chaney
- Les Channell
- Ed Chaplin
- Ben Chapman
- Frank Chapman
- Fred Chapman
- Glenn Chapman
- Harry Chapman
- Jack Chapman
- Kelvin Chapman
- Ray Chapman
- Sam Chapman
- Travis Chapman
- Harry Chappas
- Larry Chappell
- Joe Charboneau
- Pete Charton
- Hal Chase
- Ken Chase
- Anthony Chavez
- Endy Chávez
- Eric Chavez
- Jesse Chavez
- Raúl Chávez
- Charlie Chech
- Robinson Checo
- Harry Cheek
- Bruce Chen
- Larry Cheney
- Tom Cheney
- Rocky Cherry
- Paul Chervinko
- Jack Chesbro
- Mitch Chetkovich
- Scott Chiamparino
- Scott Chiasson
- Travis Chick
- Matt Chico
- Floyd Chiffer
- Jason Childers
- Rocky Childress
- Cupid Childs
- Pete Childs
- Rich Chiles
- Lou Chiozza
- Bob Chipman
- Harry Chiti
- Nelson Chittum
- Randy Choate
- Hee-seop Choi
- Shin-Soo Choo
- Bobby Chouinard
- Felix Chouinard
- Chief Chouneau
- Bruce Christensen
- John Christensen
- McKay Christensen
- Larry Christenson
- Ryan Christenson
- Neil Chrisley
- Jason Christiansen
- Mark Christman
- Steve Christmas
- Joe Christopher
- Loyd Christopher
- Mike Christopher
- Russ Christopher
- Bubba Church
- Ryan Church
- Darryl Cias
- Joe Cicero
- Eddie Cicotte
- Ted Cieslak
- Gino Cimoli
- Alex Cintrón
- Frank Cipriani
- Jeff Cirillo
- George Cisar
- Galen Cisco
- Ralph Citarella
- Al Clancy
- Bud Clancy
- Jim Clancy
- John Clapp
- Stubby Clapp
- Bob Clark
- Bobby Clark
- Bryan Clark
- Cap Clark
- Dad Clark
- Danny Clark
- George Clark
- Ginger Clark
- Howie Clark
- Jack Clark
- Jerald Clark
- Jermaine Clark
- Jim Clark
- Mark Clark
- Otey Clark
- Pep Clark
- Phil Clark
- Ron Clark
- Spider Clark
- Terry Clark
- Tony Clark
- Will Clark
- Dad Clarke
- Boileryard Clarke
- Fred Clarke
- Stan Clarke
- John Clarkson
- Ellis Clary
- Fritz Clausen
- Al Clauss
- Dain Clay
- Danny Clay
- Ken Clay
- Royce Clayton
- Mark Clear
- Joe Cleary
- Chet Clemens
- Clem Clemens
- Doug Clemens
- Roger Clemens
- Matt Clement
- Edgard Clemente
- Roberto Clemente
- Jack Clements
- Pat Clements
- Lance Clemons
- Verne Clemons
- Tex Clevenger
- Brent Clevlen
- Harlond Clift
- Monk Cline
- Ty Cline
- Gene Clines
- Jim Clinton
- Lou Clinton
- Tyler Clippard
- Tony Cloninger
- Al Closter
- Bill Clowers
- Bill Clymer
- Otis Clymer
- Gil Coan
- Jim Coates
- Buck Coats
- Ty Cobb
- Dave Coble
- George Cochran
- Dave Cochrane
- Mickey Cochrane
- Pasqual Coco
- Chris Codiroli
- Jack Coffey
- Dave Coggin
- Rich Coggins
- Ed Cogswell
- Rocky Colavito
- Craig Colbert
- Nate Colbert
- Jim Colborn
- Greg Colbrunn
- Alex Cole
- King Cole
- Stu Cole
- Curt Coleman
- Dave Coleman
- Jerry Coleman
- Joe Coleman (baseball, born 1922)
- Joe Coleman (baseball, born 1947)
- John Coleman (outfielder/pitcher)
- John Coleman (pitcher)
- Michael Coleman
- Ray Coleman
- Rip Coleman
- Vince Coleman
- Walter Coleman
- Cad Coles
- Darnell Coles
- Lou Collier
- Dave Collins
- Don Collins
- Eddie Collins
- Eddie Collins Jr.
- Hub Collins
- Jimmy Collins
- Joe Collins
- Orth Collins
- Phil Collins
- Ray Collins
- Rip Collins (catcher)
- Rip Collins (pitcher)
- Ripper Collins
- Shano Collins
- Wilson Collins
- Jackie Collum
- Jesús Colomé
- Bartolo Colón
- Cris Colón
- Román Colón
- Loyd Colson
- Bob Coluccio
- Steve Colyer
- Geoff Combe
- Earle Combs
- Merl Combs
- Pat Combs
- Steve Comer
- Charles Comiskey
- Keith Comstock
- Ralph Comstock
- Dave Concepción
- Onix Concepción
- Ramón Conde
- Clay Condrey
- David Cone
- Bunk Congalton
- Billy Conigliaro
- Tony Conigliaro
- Jeff Conine
- Jocko Conlan
- Ed Conley
- Gene Conley
- Snipe Conley
- Red Connally
- Sarge Connally
- Bill Connelly
- Ed Connolly (catcher)
- Ed Connolly (pitcher)
- Joe Connolly (1910s outfielder)
- Joe Connolly (1920s outfielder)
- Joe Connor
- John Connor
- Ned Connor
- Roger Connor
- Billy Connors
- Chuck Connors
- Joe Connors
- Brooks Conrad
- Ben Conroy
- Bill Conroy
- Tim Conroy
- Wid Conroy
- Billy Consolo
- Jim Constable
- Sandy Consuegra
- Jason Conti
- José Contreras
- Nardi Contreras
- Bill Conway
- Dick Conway
- Jerry Conway
- Rip Conway
- Aaron Cook
- Andy Cook
- Dennis Cook
- Doc Cook
- Earl Cook
- Jim Cook
- Mike Cook
- Dusty Cooke
- Steve Cooke
- Brent Cookson
- Scott Coolbaugh
- Bobby Coombs
- Cecil Coombs
- Danny Coombs
- Jack Coombs
- Ron Coomer
- William Coon
- Jimmy Cooney (1890s shortstop)
- Jimmy Cooney (1920s shortstop)
- Johnny Cooney
- Phil Cooney
- Brian Cooper
- Cecil Cooper
- Claude Cooper
- Don Cooper
- Gary Cooper (outfielder)
- Gary Cooper (third baseman)
- Guy Cooper
- Mort Cooper
- Pat Cooper
- Scott Cooper
- Walker Cooper
- Wilbur Cooper
- Trace Coquillette
- Alex Cora
- Joey Cora
- Doug Corbett
- Gene Corbett
- Joe Corbett
- Jack Corcoran
- Tim Corcoran (pitcher)
- Tim Corcoran (first baseman)
- Tommy Corcoran
- Chad Cordero
- Francisco Cordero
- Wil Cordero
- Francisco Córdova
- Marty Cordova
- Bryan Corey
- Ed Corey
- Fred Corey
- Mark Corey
- Mike Corkins
- Lance Cormier
- Rhéal Cormier
- Brad Cornett
- Pat Corrales
- Carlos Correa
- Vic Correll
- Frank Corridon
- Barry Cort
- Al Corwin
- Joe Coscarart
- Pete Coscarart
- Shane Costa
- Chris Coste
- Dan Costello
- John Costello
- Humberto Cota
- Pete Cote
- Dan Cotter
- Tom Cotter
- Ensign Cottrell
- Johnny Couch
- Mike Couchee
- Bill Coughlin
- Ed Coughlin
- Roscoe Coughlin
- Marlan Coughtry
- Bob Coulson
- Chip Coulter
- Fritz Coumbe
- Craig Counsell
- Clint Courtney
- Dee Cousineau
- Jon Coutlangus
- Harry Coveleski
- Stan Coveleski
- Chet Covington
- Wes Covington
- Al Cowens
- Joe Cowley
- Bill Cox
- Billy Cox
- Bobby Cox
- Danny Cox
- Darron Cox
- Glenn Cox
- Jeff Cox
- Jim Cox
- Larry Cox
- Red Cox
- Ted Cox
- Charlie Cozart
- Roy Crabb
- Callix Crabbe
- Estel Crabtree
- Tim Crabtree
- Rickey Cradle
- Howard Craghead
- Rod Craig
- Roger Craig
- Jesse Crain
- Doc Cramer
- Ed Crane
- Sam Crane (second baseman)
- Sam Crane (shortstop)
- Gavvy Cravath
- Bill Craver
- Carl Crawford
- Glenn Crawford
- Jake Crawford
- Jim Crawford
- Pat Crawford
- Paxton Crawford
- Sam Crawford
- Steve Crawford
- Willie Crawford
- George Creamer
- Joe Crede
- Birdie Cree
- Pat Creeden
- Doug Creek
- Jack Creel
- Keith Creel
- Bob Cremins
- César Crespo
- Felipe Crespo
- Jerry Crider
- Lou Criger
- Dave Cripe
- Dave Criscione
- Tony Criscola
- Coco Crisp
- Ches Crist
- Hughie Critz
- Claude Crocker
- Art Croft
- D. T. Cromer
- Tripp Cromer
- Herb Crompton
- Ned Crompton
- Chris Cron
- Jack Cronin
- Joe Cronin
- Jack Crooks
- Bobby Crosby
- Bubba Crosby
- Ed Crosby
- Frankie Crosetti
- Zach Crouch
- Rich Croushore
- Don Crow
- Alvin Crowder
- George Crowe
- Bill Crowley
- Ed Crowley
- John Crowley
- Terry Crowley
- Mike Crudale
- Deivi Cruz
- Héctor Cruz
- Henry Cruz
- Iván Cruz
- Jacob Cruz
- José Cruz
- José Cruz Jr.
- Juan Cruz
- Julio Cruz
- Nelson Cruz (outfielder)
- Nelson Cruz (pitcher)
- Todd Cruz
- Tommy Cruz
- Víctor Cruz
- Mike Cubbage
- Al Cuccinello
- Tony Cuccinello
- Cookie Cuccurullo
- Michael Cuddyer
- Bobby Cuellar
- Mike Cuellar
- Johnny Cueto
- Manuel Cueto
- Jack Cullen
- Tim Cullen
- Nick Cullop (outfielder)
- Nick Cullop (pitcher)
- Benny Culp
- Bill Culp
- Candy Cummings
- Midre Cummings
- Steve Cummings
- Will Cunnane
- George Cuppy
- John Curran
- Jim Curry
- Steve Curry
- Wes Curry
- Chad Curtis
- Cliff Curtis
- Fred Curtis
- Harry Curtis
- Jack Curtis
- John Curtis
- Vern Curtis
- Guy Curtright
- Ed Cushman
- Jack Cust
- Ned Cuthbert
- George Cutshaw
- Kiki Cuyler
- Milt Cuyler
- Mike Cvengros
- Al Cypert
- Éric Cyr
- Jim Czajkowski
