= Crookston Pirates =

- 1902–1941; (1902–1905, 1933–1941); Crookston, Minnesota

Minor league affiliations
- Class: Class D (1902–1905, 1933–1940); Class C (1941)
- League: Northern League (1902–1905, 1933–1941)

Major league affiliations
- Team: Chicago White Sox (1936); St. Louis Cardinals (1937); Boston Red Sox (1938)

Minor league titles
- League titles (0): None
- Wild card berths (2): 1937; 1938

Team data
- Name: Crookston Crooks (1902–1905); Crookston Pirates (1933–1941)
- Ballpark: Crookston Field (1902–1905); Highland Park (1933–1941)

The Crookston Pirates were a minor league baseball team based in Crookston, Minnesota. Crookston teams played exclusively as members of the Class D level Northern League, in two different spans, fielding league teams from 1902 to 1905 and again from 1933 to 1941. The Crookston Pirates were a minor league affiliate of the Chicago White Sox in 1936, St. Louis Cardinals in 1937, and Boston Red Sox in 1938. Crookston teams hosted home Northern League games at Crookston Field (1902–1905) and Highland Park (1933–1941).

Today, the Crookston "Pirates" moniker is used by Crookston High School, established in 1914.

== History ==
Crookston was a charter member of the Class D level Northern League in 1902, playing as the Crookston Crooks before disbanding after the 1905 season.

Beginning in 1933, the Crookston Pirates played in the Northern League from 1933 to 1941 and were affiliates of the Chicago White Sox in 1936, the St. Louis Cardinals in 1937 and the Boston Red Sox in 1938.

The Crookston teams did not win a championship in their duration of play but did qualify for the 1937 and 1938 Northern League playoffs.

Crookston High School was founded in 1914 and still uses the "Pirates" moniker.

== The ballparks ==
The Crookston Crooks teams hosted minor league home games at Crookston Field from 1902 to 1905.

From 1933 to 1941, the Crookston Pirates hosted home minor league games at Highland Park in Crookston. With dimensions of 340–420–329, Highland Park had a capacity of 2,000 (1938). Today, the park is still in use a public park. The Highland Park Complex sits on 40 acres (16 ha), located at North Central Avenue and Barrette Street in Crookston.

== Timeline ==
| Year(s) | # Yrs. | Team | Level | League | Affiliate | Ballpark |
|---|---|---|---|---|---|---|
| 1902–1905 | 4 | Crookston Crooks | Class D | Northern League | None | Crookston Field |
| 1933–1935 | 3 | Crookston Pirates | Class D | Northern League | None | Highland Park |
| 1936 | 1 | Crookston Pirates | Class D | Northern League | Chicago White Sox | Highland Park |
| 1937 | 1 | Crookston Pirates | Class D | Northern League | St. Louis Cardinals | Highland Park |
| 1938 | 1 | Crookston Pirates | Class D | Northern League | Boston Red Sox | Highland Park |
| 1939-1940 | 2 | Crookston Pirates | Class D | Northern League | None | Highland Park |
| 1941 | 1 | Crookston Pirates | Class C | Northern League | None | Highland Park |

== Year-by-year records ==
| Year | Record | Finish | Manager | Playoffs/Notes |
|---|---|---|---|---|
| 1902 | 31–25 | 2nd | William Lycan | No playoffs held |
| 1903 | 55–41 | 3rd | William Lycan / William Bray | No playoffs held |
| 1904 | 33–36 | 4th | Bill McNeil / William Lycan | No playoffs held |
| 1905 | 38–63 | 6th | Bill McNeil / N. Davies | No playoffs held |
| 1933 | 48–48 | 5th | Lute Boone | No playoffs held |
| 1934 | 62–58 | 3rd | Lute Boone | No playoffs held |
| 1935 | 45–65 | 7th | Lute Boone | Did not qualify |
| 1936 | 54–68 | 7th | Ken Penner | Did not qualify |
| 1937 | 61–57 | 4th | Erwin Schueren | Lost in 1st round |
| 1938 | 69–47 | 3rd | Bill Burwell | Lost in finals |
| 1939 | 43–76 | 8th | Phil Todt | Did not qualify |
| 1940 | 49–74 | 7th | Fred Neisler | Did not qualify |
| 1941 | 46–68 | 7th | Abe Stemig | Did not qualify |

== Notable alumni ==
- Sheldon "Chief" Bender (1939–1940)
- Lute Boone (1933–1935, MGR)
- Bill Burwell (1938, MGR)
- Bill Butland (1938)
- Walter Carlisle (1902–1904)
- Oscar Georgy (1937)
- Jack Hallett (1935)
- Joe Hatten (1939)
- Jesse Hoffmeister (1903–1904)
- Elmer Johnson (1934–1936, 1939–1940)
- Dan Lally (1904)
- Ham Patterson (1904)
- Ken Penner (1936, MGR)
- Les Rock (1934–1935)
- Ernie Rudolph (1937)
- Phil Todt (1939, MGR)
- Julie Wera (1937)
- Wes Westrum (1940) 2x MLB All–Star
- Rollie Zeider (1905)

== See also ==
- Crookston Crooks players
- Crookston Pirates players
