= Warhop =

Warhop is a surname. Notable people with the surname include:

- George Warhop (born 1961), American football coach
- Jack Warhop (1884–1960), American baseball pitcher
