= Jason Rogers =

Jason Rogers may refer to:

- Jason Rogers (publisher) (1868–1932), American newspaper publisher
- Jason Rogers (fencer) (born 1983), American saber fencer
- Jason Rogers (athlete) (born 1991), Saint Kitts and Nevis sprinter
- Jason Rogers (baseball) (born 1988), American baseball player
- Jason Rogers (comics), fictional character from DC Comics

== See also ==
- Jay Rogers (1888–1964), Major League Baseball catcher
