= Doc Cook (disambiguation) =

Doc Cook (1891–1958) was an American jazz bandleader.

Doc Cook may also refer to:

- Doc Cook (baseball) (1886–1973), baseball player

== See also ==
- Doc Cooke, head men's basketball coach
