= Washington College (California) =

Former coeducational technical school in Irvington, California

Coordinates: 37.5347°N 121.9523°W

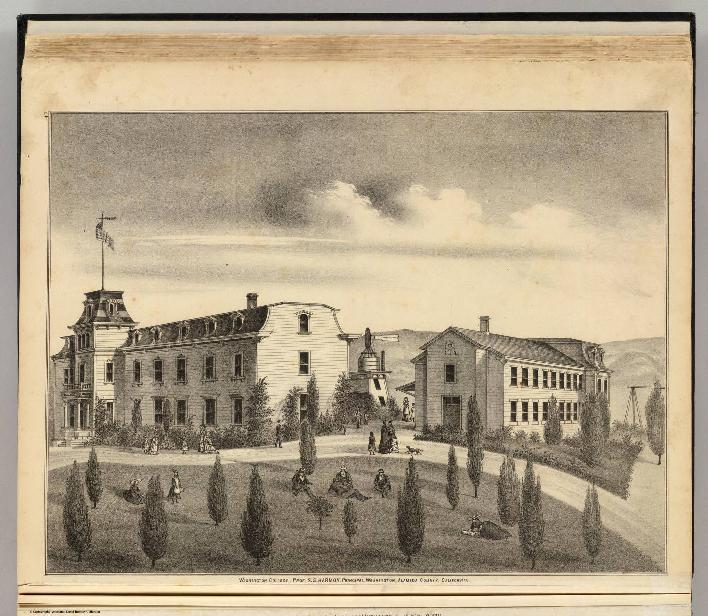

Information
- School type: Technical school
- Religious affiliations: opened 1872 nonsectarian; after 1883 The Disciples of Christ
- Established: 1871
- Closed: 1894
- Gender: Mixed

Washington College, also called Washington College of Science and Industry, was a private coeducational technical school established in 1871 in the village of Washington Corners, which later (1884) became the town of Irvington, now (since 1956) part of the City of Fremont, California. Washington College opened in 1872 and was one of the first coeducational technical schools in California. In 1883, the college transitioned to a sectarian coeducational institution of higher education, under the auspices of the Disciples of Christ, and offered both preparatory and college-level courses until it closed in 1894. Washington College was succeeded in 1896 by a girls' school, the Curtner Seminary. After a fire in 1899, this was in turn succeeded in 1900 by a military school for boys, Anderson Academy, which operated until the outbreak of World War I.

== History ==
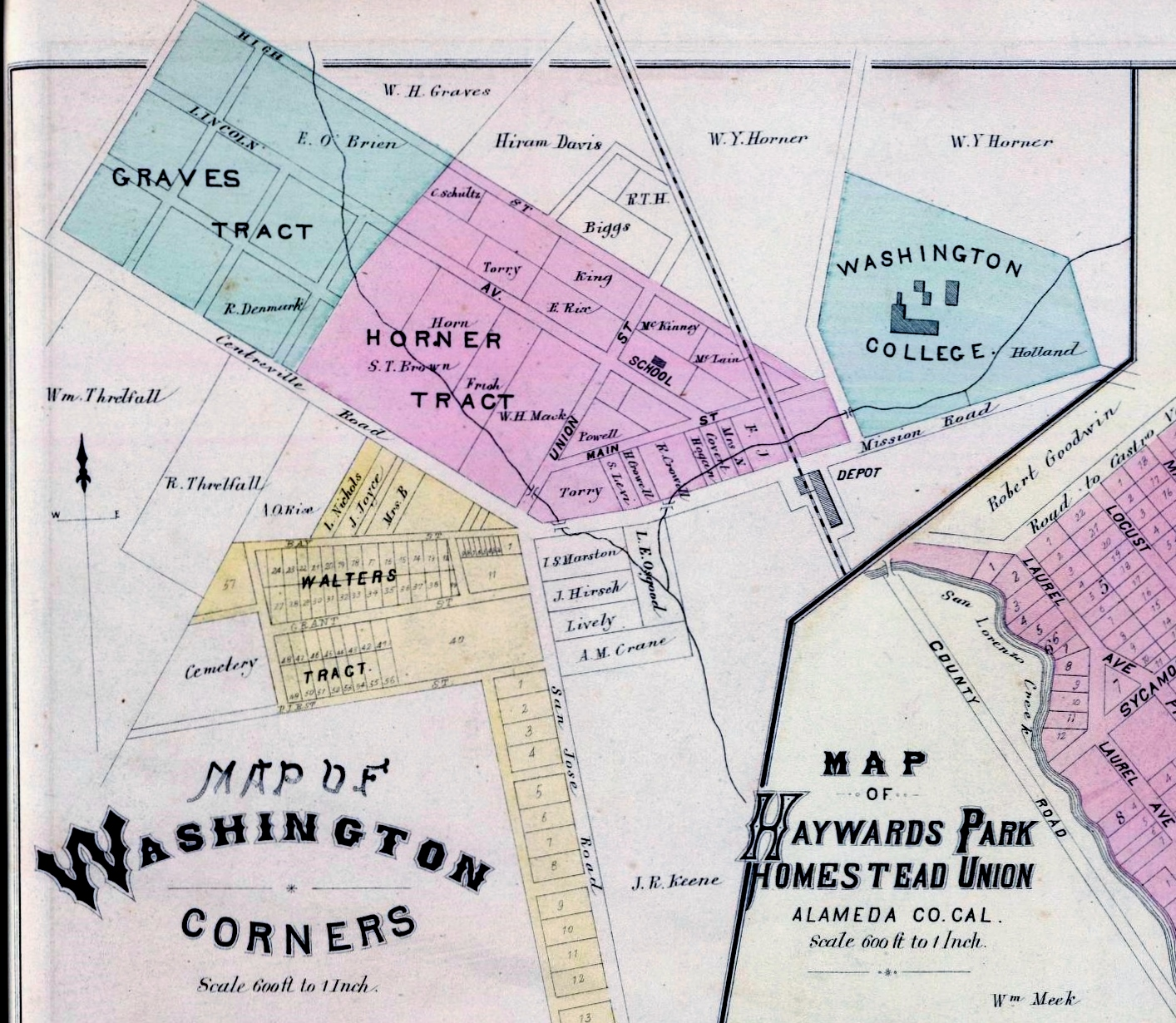
Washington College (green, upper right) on a 1878 map of Washington Corners

Washington College was founded in 1871 on a small hummock donated by E.L. Beard, located across from the C.P.R.R. Washington Corners depot, by the people of Washington Township as a scientific and industrial school. The founders were local landowners, educators and farmers, including W.F. Lynch, Albert Lyser, William Horner, Origin Mowry, H. Curtner, S.I. Marston, H. Crowell, and M.W. Dixon. The first building cost $30,000. It opened in July 1872 with the Reverend Silas Sykes Harmon and his wife as teachers. Two of their daughters later taught there; Rev. Harmon later started a school in Berkeley. It was coeducational and nonsectarian; according to its catalog, "The idea is that young women should enjoy equal intellectual advantages with young men, and that they should be educated together." Courses were given in bookkeeping, calligraphy, commercial letter writing, Latin, Greek, and advanced English. By its third year of operation, it had an enrollment of 130 students from all over the state, only some of whom lived on campus in an impressive dorm, women on the first floor and men on the second, with a gymnasium for group exercise. The Daily Alta California on August 13, 1875, reported another year of college overflow, necessitating the procurement of entire houses from the village to house the overflow students, and called for the construction of new campus buildings for housing. Washington College continued as a nonsectarian coeducational academy for eleven years until 1883.

One of the founders, and the owner of the land, was Henry Curtner, a local landowner and merchant. In August 1883, under a lease agreement with Curtner, the college opened as an institution of higher education under the auspices of the Disciples of Christ, with J. Durham, Mr. Pollard, and J. H. McCollough as early leaders. The San Francisco Bulletin, on May 27, 1886, described the curriculum as including "preparatory, scientific, classical and commercial courses." By the 1890s, it offered classical, scientific, Biblical, and artistic courses both at college level and in preparation for university entry. Its college-level courses were the first offered in Alameda County. Enrollment began to drop after public schools opened in California in the 1890s. The college closed when President J. C. Keith retired in 1894.

Washington College was described in the 1939 Federal Writers' Project Guide to California as "one of the State's pioneers in industrial education".

== Successor institutions ==
In 1896, Curtner opened Curtner Ladies' Seminary, a girls' school, in the college buildings under the leadership of H. C. Ingram and his wife, Ingar Stephenson-Ingram, both of whom had been teachers at the college. Other Washington College faculty also continued to teach there. According to a retrospective in the Oakland Tribune on April 15, 1953, there were accommodations for 52 students. It began as a high school but later added a normal school course, which was much in demand at the time. The main building burned down on the morning of July 4, 1899; since Ingar Ingram was seriously ill, the school did not reopen.

In 1900, with the assistance of Irvington and nearby towns, William Walker Anderson built a new school on the site and moved his University Seminary, a military school for boys, from Alameda, renaming it Anderson's Academy. A redwood gymnasium was designed by architect Charles E. Gottschalk.

Anderson Academy closed in 1914, and the Anderson family used the site as their home, renaming it "Bonnie Brae". In 1942, it was bought by the Giles family, whose land had been requisitioned by the Armed Services for Camp Parks. Their estate, "Peacock Hill", was redeveloped as "Timber Creek Terrace" for housing in the 1980s.

== Notable people ==
- Frank Chance, baseball player and manager
