= Khedive, Pennsylvania =

Unincorporated community in Pennsylvania, US

- Unincorporated community
- Location within Pennsylvania Location within the United States
- Coordinates: 39°53′2″N 80°2′10″W
- Country: United States
- State: Pennsylvania
- County: Greene
- Township: Cumberland
- Elevation: 1,020 ft (310 m)
- Time zone: UTC-5 (Eastern (EST))
  - Summer (DST): UTC-4 (EDT)
- GNIS feature ID: 1178440

Khedive is an unincorporated community in Greene County, Pennsylvania, United States. It is located at an elevation of 1,020 feet (311 m).

== History ==
A post office called Khedive was established in 1882, and remained in operation until being discontinued in 1934. The community was named after Khedive, a royal title in the Middle East.

== Notable person ==
- Birdie Cree, professional baseball outfielder for the New York Highlanders
