= Julie Wera =

American baseball player (1902–1975)

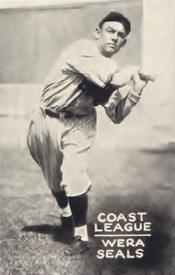
- Third baseman
- Born: February 9, 1902; Winona, Minnesota, U.S.
- Died: December 12, 1975 (aged 73); Rochester, Minnesota, U.S.
- Batted: Right Threw: Right

MLB debut
- April 14, 1927, for the New York Yankees

Last MLB appearance
- October 6, 1929, for the New York Yankees

MLB statistics
- Batting average: .278
- Home runs: 1
- Runs batted in: 10
- Stats at Baseball Reference

Teams
- New York Yankees (1927, 1929)

Career highlights and awards
- World Series champion (1927)

Julian Valentine "Julie" Wera (born Werra; February 9, 1902 – December 12, 1975) was an American professional baseball third baseman who played for the New York Yankees of Major League Baseball during the 1927 and 1929 seasons.

== Early life ==
Julian Valentine Werra was born on February 9, 1902, to John and Anna Werra, who immigrated to the United States from Prussia in the Kashubian diaspora in 1893 and settled in Winona, Minnesota. He was the sixth of their nine surviving children, and dropped out of school to work in a meatpacking plant. Wera changed the spelling of his name when he began his professional career.

== Career ==
Wera began playing sandlot baseball, and joined Winona's top amateur team in 1921, when he was 19 years old. He moved to Wausau, Wisconsin, in May 1924, to play semi-professional baseball. Wera made his professional baseball debut for the St. Paul Saints of the American Association in September. St. Paul optioned Wera to the Peoria Tractors of the Illinois–Indiana–Iowa League in 1925, and he played for the Saints in 1926.

The New York Yankees had a working agreement with the Saints, and they purchased Wera from the Saints for Leo Durocher, $25,000 ($444,032 in current dollar terms), and two players to be named later after the 1926 season. He made the Yankees in 1927 as a reserve third baseman behind Joe Dugan. He hit his only major league home run on July 4 off of Bobby Burke of the Washington Senators. During a game on July 22, Wera collided with Ray Schalk of the Chicago White Sox at home plate. He injured his knee, which limited him in the remainder of his career. Wera batted .238 in 38 games played for the 1927 Yankees. The Yankees won the 1927 World Series, but Wera did not appear in the series.

The Yankees optioned Wera to the Hollywood Stars of the Pacific Coast League (PCL) for the 1928 season. The Yankees recalled Wera after the PCL season ended in August and traded him to St. Paul with Al Shealy and Archie Campbell for Fred Heimach. The Yankees brought Wera to spring training in 1929, but optioned him to the Jersey City Skeeters of the International League. After the International League's 1929 season ended, the Yankees recalled Wera, and he played in five games for the Yankees in 1929. He batted 5-for-12 (.417) in the five games.

Before the 1930 season, the Yankees sold Wera outright to Jersey City. After the 1930 season, the Yankees purchased Wera from Jersey City, so that they could send him to the San Francisco Seals of the PCL as part of the payment for Frankie Crosetti. He played for the Seals into the 1933 season, when he struggled and was sold to the Oakland Oaks of the PCL.

In January 1934, Oakland traded Wera to the Portland Beavers of the PCL for Eddie Mulligan. However, he refused to report to Portland, and in February, Portland sold Wera to the Fort Worth Panthers of the Texas League. Wera refused to report there as well, and spent the 1934 season as a player-manager for a semi-professional team in Wisconsin Rapids, Wisconsin. He returned to organized baseball in 1935, signing with the Syracuse Chiefs of the International League. Syracuse released him during the season, and he finished the year with the Buffalo Bisons of the International League. Wera played for the Toronto Maple Leafs of the International League in 1936. Toronto released him before the 1937 season, and he served as player-manager of the Crookston Pirates of the Northern League that year.

== Later life ==
Wera married Dorothy Fischer, an elementary school teacher in Winona, on November 18, 1931. They had two sons and one daughter.

After Wera retired from baseball, he became a butcher for a Piggly Wiggly in Rochester, Minnesota. He was the manager of the meat department for 27 years before he retired.

Wera died of a heart attack in his home in Rochester on December 12, 1975.

== Imposter ==
In 1948, somebody portraying himself as Wera became the business manager of the Oroville Red Sox of the Class D Far West League. The imposter ran the team well, and they won the league's championship. He also told stories about his time with Babe Ruth. On September 11, 1948, he died by suicide by overdosing on sleeping pills, while leaving behind a suicide note to his estranged wife. Newspapers ran the story that Wera had died from suicide at the age of 38. The next day, a friend of Wera's in Rochester saw the story and alerted him, and Wera announced to the press that he was still alive.

The imposter was identified as William J. Wera through his fingerprints from his attempt to gain employment in a casino in Reno, Nevada, in July 1947. His widow, Ruth, said that she "was as much surprised as anyone else" when she found out that her husband was an imposter. Though it was initially believed that Wera was a cousin, they were not related. The imposter had gone to Charlie Graham, the president of the Seals, and asked for a job. When Graham pointed out that the imposter did not look like Wera, the imposter said that he had plastic surgery to repair his face after a mine detonated near him during World War II. However, Wera had been classified as 4–F by the Selective Service System, ruling him ineligible for military service. Graham contacted Jerry Donovan, a former teammate of Wera's with San Francisco who was president of the Far West League, who did not question the story and found that the imposter had enough knowledge of baseball to offer him the job with Oroville.
