= Frank Chance =

American baseball player and manager (1877–1924)

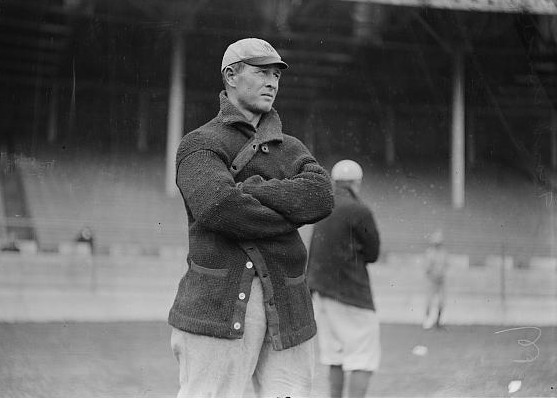
- Chance with the New York Yankees in 1913
- First baseman / Manager
- Born: September 9, 1877; Salida, California, U.S.
- Died: September 15, 1924 (aged 47); Los Angeles, California, U.S.
- Batted: Right Threw: Right

MLB debut
- April 29, 1898, for the Chicago Orphans

Last MLB appearance
- April 21, 1914, for the New York Yankees

MLB statistics
- Batting average: .296
- Home runs: 20
- Runs batted in: 596
- Stolen bases: 401
- Managerial record: 946–648
- Stats at Baseball Reference
- Managerial record at Baseball Reference

Teams
- As player: Chicago Orphans / Cubs (1898–1912); New York Yankees (1913–1914); As manager: Chicago Cubs (1905–1912); New York Yankees (1913–1914); Boston Red Sox (1923)

Career highlights and awards
- 2× World Series champion (1907, 1908); 2× NL stolen base leader (1903, 1906); NL runs scored leader (1906); Chicago Cubs Hall of Fame

Member of the National

Baseball Hall of Fame
- Induction: 1946
- Election method: Old-Timers Committee

Frank Leroy Chance (September 9, 1877 – September 15, 1924) was an American professional baseball player. A first baseman, Chance played in Major League Baseball for the Chicago Cubs and New York Yankees from 1898 through 1914. He also served as manager of the Cubs, Yankees, and Boston Red Sox.

Discovered by the Cubs as he played semi-professional baseball while attending college, Chance debuted with the Cubs in 1898, serving as a part-time player. In 1903, Chance became the Cubs' regular first baseman, and in 1905, he succeeded Frank Selee as the team's manager. Chance led the Cubs to 100 wins in 1906, 1907, 1909, and 1910, becoming the first manager to compile four 100-win seasons (only eight other managers have accomplished the feat in MLB history), with no manager, other than Chance, leading a team to 100 wins four times in five seasons. They would win four National League championships in that span and won the World Series in 1907 and 1908. With Joe Tinker and Johnny Evers, Chance formed a strong double play combination, which was immortalized as "Tinker-to-Evers-to-Chance" in "Baseball's Sad Lexicon".

Let go by the Cubs after the 1912 season, Chance signed with the Yankees, serving as a player–manager for two seasons. He joined the Los Angeles Angels of the Pacific Coast League as a player–manager, returning to MLB in 1923 as manager of the Red Sox. Chance was named the manager of the Chicago White Sox in 1924, but never took control of the team as he became ill. He died later that year.

Noted for his leadership abilities, Chance earned the nickname "Peerless Leader." He is the all-time leader in managerial winning percentage in Cubs history. Chance was elected to the Baseball Hall of Fame in the 1946 balloting by the Veterans Committee, along with Tinker and Evers. He was inducted into the Fresno County Athletic Hall of Fame's first class, in 1959.

== Early life ==
Chance was born in Salida, California, in Stanislaus County, on September 9, 1877. His family was of English and Scottish descent. He was raised in Fresno, California and attended Fresno High School. His father was president of the first national bank in Fresno.

Chance enrolled at the University of California, where he pursued a degree in dentistry. He transferred to Washington College in Irvington, California. While playing baseball for the school's baseball team, he received an offer to play semi-professional baseball for a team in Sullivan, Illinois, for $40 a month ($1,548 in current dollar terms), which he accepted.

Returning to college the next year, Chance led his team to a third-place finish in an amateur tournament of 50 teams. Bill Lange of the Chicago Cubs discovered Chance and convinced the Cubs to sign him as a backup catcher and outfielder, receiving $1,200 a year ($46,440 in current dollar terms). Chance was scouted by other teams, but chose the Cubs as Tim Donohue was the only catcher ahead of him on the Cubs' depth chart.

== Professional baseball career ==
=== Chicago Cubs ===
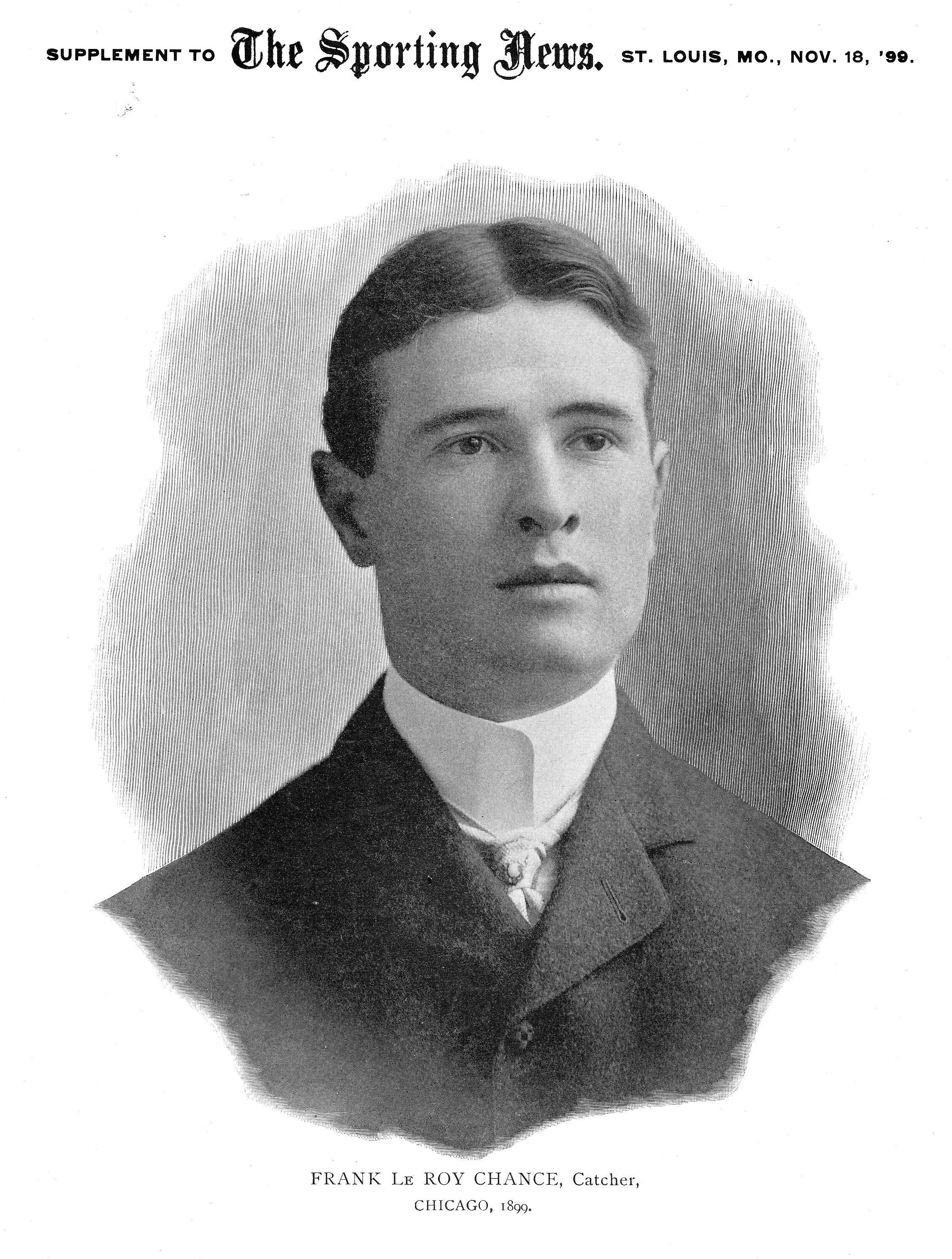
Chance circa 1899 from The Sporting News

Chance began his career in 1898 with the Chicago Cubs, serving as a reserve catcher and outfielder. He played irregularly through the 1902 season. Due in part to finger injuries suffered while catching, Chance played in no more than 75 games in a season through 1902. In 1903, Johnny Kling became the Cubs' full-time catcher. As Bill Hanlon, the Cubs' first baseman, left the team, manager Frank Selee moved Chance to first base. Though Chance initially balked at the position change, he agreed when he received a pay raise.

Chance enjoyed a breakout season in 1903, recording a .327 batting average and 67 stolen bases; the latter mark led the National League (NL). His .439 on-base percentage was third-best in the league, behind Roy Thomas and Roger Bresnahan, and his 81 runs batted in (RBIs) tied Jake Beckley for sixth-best. Chance had a .310 batting average in 1904, good for sixth place in the NL. His .382 on-base percentage was the fourth-best in the league, and his .430 slugging percentage was fifth-best. Chance also hit six home runs, tying him with Dan McGann, Red Dooin, and Cozy Dolan for third place, his 42 stolen bases tied McGann for fourth place, and his 89 runs scored were seventh-best. On May 30, 1904, he was hit by a pitch five times in a double header.

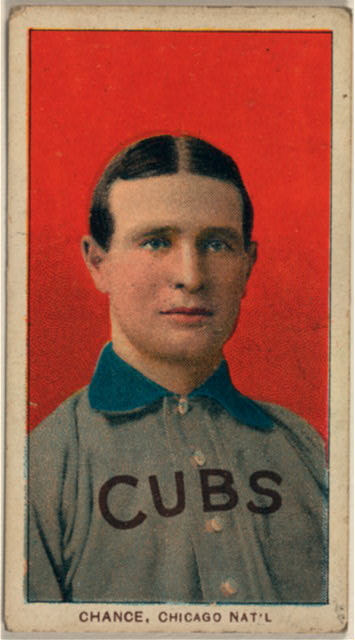
Frank Chance baseball card

Selee fell ill in 1905, and Chance was selected to succeed him as manager. That year, he also batted .316 with 92 runs scored and 70 RBIs. His batting average was sixth-best in the NL, while he led the league with a .450 on-base percentage, and finished seventh with a .434 slugging percentage. His 38 stolen bases were sixth-best in the league. In 1906, Chance batted .319 and led the NL in runs scored (103) and stolen bases (57). His batting average was fifth-best in the league, while his .419 on-base percentage finished in third, and his .430 slugging percentage placed him in fifth. When Chance stole home from second base in a tie game against the Cincinnati Reds, team owner Charles W. Murphy granted him a ten-percent ownership stake in the club to show his gratitude. Chance later sold his share of the franchise for approximately $150,000. Meanwhile, The Cubs won 116 games during the 1906 season, taking the NL pennant. The Chicago White Sox of the American League defeated the Cubs in the 1906 World Series.

Chance batted .293 during the 1907 season, finishing sixth in the NL, while his .395 on-base percentage was third-best. He tied Ed Abbaticchio for seventh with 35 stolen bases. The Cubs returned to the World Series in 1907. Though Chance only batted .154 in the 1907 World Series, the Cubs defeated the Tigers in four games.

Chance began to decline during the 1908 season. Though he finished third in the NL with 27 doubles, he did not finish among the ten best in the categories of batting average, on-base percentage, or stolen bases in 1908, 1909, or 1910. Chance batted .421 in the 1908 World Series, as the Cubs again defeated the Tigers, this time in five games.

By 1910, Chance began to groom Fred Luderus as his successor at first base. He rebuilt the team in 1911 after Evers's nervous breakdown and the departure of Harry Steinfeldt, replacing them with Heinie Zimmerman and Jim Doyle respectively. The Cubs returned to the World Series in 1910, against the Philadelphia Athletics. Chance batted .353 in the 1910 World Series, though the Athletics won the series in five games. Chance was ejected in game three, becoming the first player ever ejected from a World Series game. Chance continued to transition himself out of the Cubs' lineup in 1911, as he played in only 31 games.

=== New York Yankees ===
In 1912, Chance endured surgeries to correct blood clots in his brain that were caused by being hit by pitches in his head. Meanwhile, Chance argued with Murphy, who had been releasing expensive players from the Cubs in an effort to save the team money. The New York Yankees negotiated for Chance's release from the Cubs after the 1912 season. The Cubs released Chance while he was hospitalized, and in January 1913, Chance signed a three-year contract with the Yankees, worth $120,000 ($3,909,091 in current dollar terms), to serve as the Yankees' manager. He also played first base for the Yankees and served as field captain, though he played in no more than 12 games in a season. The Yankees sat in last place on the next-to-last day of the 1913 season, but won their final game to finish in seventh place. In 1914, Chance named Roger Peckinpaugh the Yankees' new captain.

After struggling during the 1914 season, Chance criticized the talent brought to him by Yankees scout Arthur Irwin. After repeatedly seeking to have Irwin fired, he offered his resignation from the team late in the season on the condition that he still was to receive his 1915 salary. After this was accepted by team owner Frank J. Farrell, Chance resigned with three weeks remaining in the season, and Peckinpaugh served as player–manager for the remainder of the season.

=== Later career ===
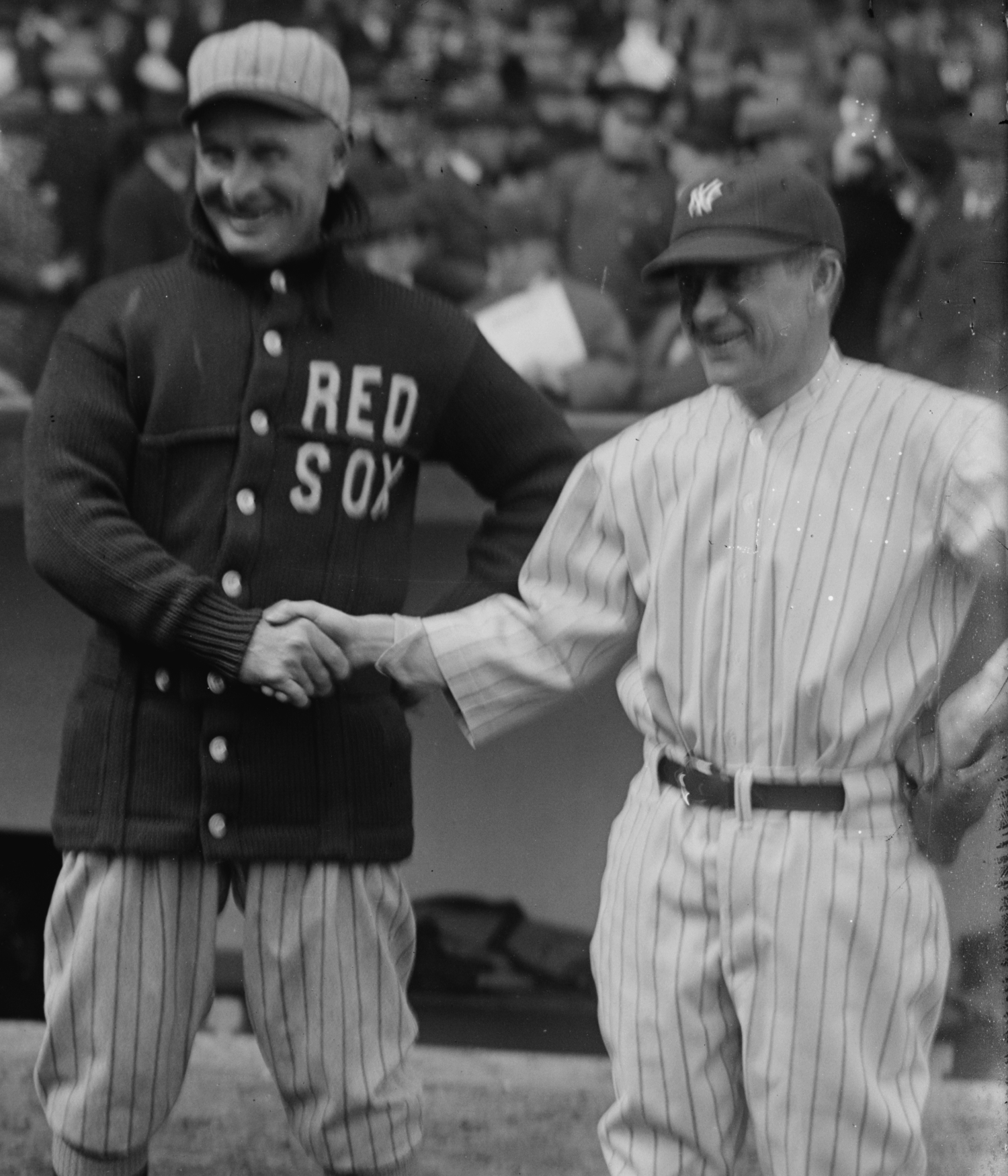
Chance (left) shakes hands with Miller Huggins in 1923

Chance returned to his native California, and was named manager of the Los Angeles Angels of the Pacific Coast League in 1916. Chance won the league championship in 1916. He re-signed with the Angels for the 1917 season and was also granted a part ownership in the Angels from the majority owner, John F. Powers. Powers and Chance remained good friends for the rest of his life. He resigned during the 1917 season due to his declining health. He then served as president of the California Winter League, continuing to instill discipline in players: he fined Ty Cobb for "abusing an umpire".

Chance managed the Boston Red Sox in 1923. The Red Sox did not retain Chance after the season. But some sources noted that Chance had only agreed to a one-year contract and was not necessarily interested in returning to the Red Sox, a team described by one sportswriter as no better than a minor league club. After his relationship with the Red Sox was severed, he was named the Chicago White Sox manager for the 1924 season but developed severe influenza before he could take the helm. He soon developed other respiratory complications, including asthma. Chance submitted his resignation to owner Charles Comiskey, but Comiskey refused to accept it, giving him the opportunity to return to the team when his health improved. He returned to Chicago briefly in April, but was unable to take charge of the team. Chance returned to Los Angeles where he underwent emergency surgery in April 1924. Evers was named the White Sox acting manager for the 1924 season.

=== Career summary ===
==== Overview ====
Chance was part of the trio of infielders remembered for their double-play ability, with Joe Tinker and Johnny Evers. The trio were immortalized as "Tinker-to-Evers-to-Chance", also known as "Baseball's Sad Lexicon", written by the 28-year-old New York Evening Mail newspaper columnist Franklin Pierce Adams in July 1910. Chance helped Evers develop an underhanded throw.

Chance took over as Chicago's manager in 1905. His playing time decreased towards the end of the decade. The Cubs won the NL pennant in 1906, 1907, 1908 and 1910, and won the World Series in 1907 and 1908—the team's last World Series titles before 2016. He became the highest paid player in baseball, earning an estimated $25,000 (equivalent to $863,839 in 2025) in 1910, which included dividends on 10 percent ownership stake in the Cubs. Noted for his leadership abilities, Chance earned the nickname "Peerless Leader." John McGraw, a contemporary and rival of Chance, considered Chance one of the greatest players he ever saw.

Chance's lifetime record as a manager was 946–648 (.593 winning percentage); his .664 winning percentage as manager of the Cubs is the highest in franchise history. As a player, Chance is the Cubs' all-time career leader in stolen bases, with 400. He led the Cubs in batting average in 1903, 1904, 1905 and 1907. In World Series play, Chance batted .300, recording 21 hits, scoring 11 runs, and stealing 10 bases.

Chance was a disciplinarian. He preached moderation in socializing, including avoiding alcohol, to his players. Chance fined his players for shaking hands with opposing teams' players and forced Solly Hofman to delay his wedding until after the baseball season, lest marriage impair his abilities on the playing field. In August 1911, Chance suspended Tinker for the remainder of the season for using profanity, though he reinstated Tinker two days later.

==== Managerial record ====
Team	Year	Regular season					Postseason			
Team	Year	Games	Won	Lost	Win %	Finish	Won	Lost	Win %	Result
CHC	1905	88	55	33	.625	3rd in NL	–	–	–	–
CHC	1906	152	116	36	.763	1st in NL	2	4	.333	Lost World Series (CWS)
CHC	1907	152	107	45	.704	1st in NL	4	0	1.000	Won World Series (DET)
CHC	1908	154	99	55	.643	1st in NL	4	1	.800	Won World Series (DET)
CHC	1909	153	104	49	.680	2nd in NL	–	–	–	–
CHC	1910	154	104	50	.675	1st in NL	1	4	.200	Lost World Series (PHA)
CHC	1911	154	92	62	.597	2nd in NL	–	–	–	–
CHC	1912	150	91	59	.607	3rd in NL	–	–	–	–
CHC total		1157	768	389	.664		11	9	.550	
NYY	1913	151	57	94	.377	7th in AL	–	–	–	–
NYY	1914	134	60	74	.448	resigned	–	–	–	–
NYY total		285	117	168	.411		0	0	–	
BOS	1923	152	61	91	–	8th in AL	–	–	–	–
BOS total		152	61	91	.401		0	0	–	
Total		1594	946	648	.593		11	9	.550	

== Personal ==
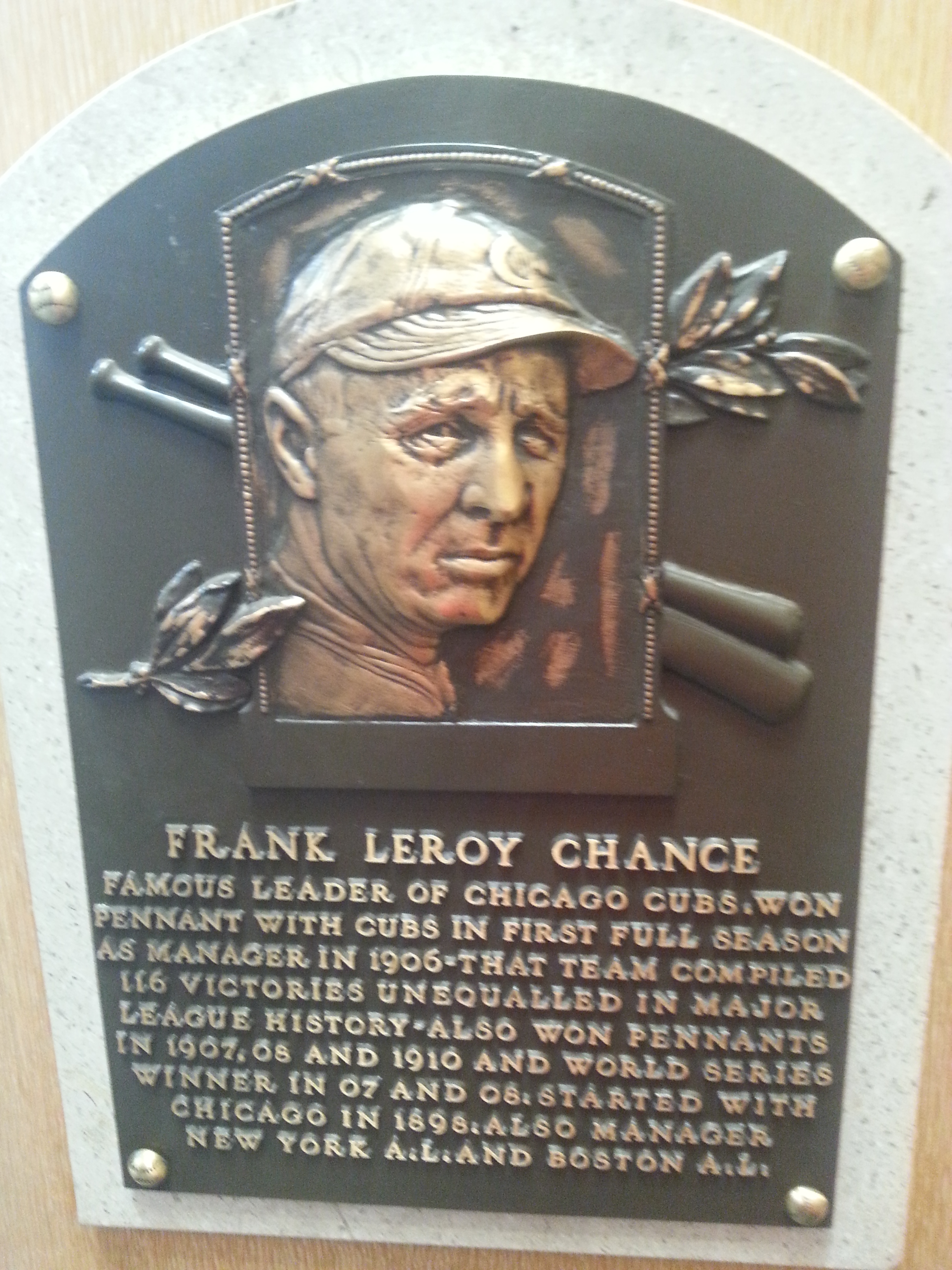
Chance's Baseball Hall of Fame plaque

During the baseball offseasons, Chance worked as a prizefighter. James J. Corbett and John L. Sullivan, among the best fighters of the era, both considered Chance "the greatest amateur brawler of all time." Chance owned a ranch in Glendora, California, which he sold in 1922 prior to becoming manager of the Red Sox. He also built the Frank Chance Building in downtown Glendora in 1912, also known as the "Cub Building" because it housed the Cub Grocery for many years. It still stands.

Chance married Edythe Pancake on October 3, 1903. Edythe became an advocate for baseball, imploring women to attend baseball games.

Chance died on September 15, 1924 at age 47. Some sources simply said that he died after a "long illness", while others attributed it to heart disease brought on by severe spasms of bronchial asthma. He was survived by his wife, mother, sister, and three brothers. Chance was interred in the Angelus-Rosedale Cemetery, Los Angeles. His death was greatly mourned, and his funeral received widespread publicity in Los Angeles and Chicago. Among his pallbearers were Powers and race car driver Barney Oldfield. His estate was valued at $170,000 ($2.35 million today).

== Honors ==
After falling short of induction in the Baseball Hall of Fame by seven votes in 1945, Chance was elected to the Hall of Fame in the 1946 balloting by the Veterans Committee. Tinker and Evers were elected the same year. Chance was also elected to the Fresno County Athletic Hall of Fame's first class, in 1959.

A baseball field in Fresno named after Chance operated from 1935 to 1941. Joe DiMaggio played in the first-ever game at Frank Chance Field. Retired players participated in an exhibition game in Chance's honor in 1937.

The City of Hope National Medical Center created the Frank L. Chance Research Fellowship Foundation in his memory in 1955.

== See also ==
- List of Major League Baseball annual runs scored leaders
- List of Major League Baseball annual stolen base leaders
- List of Major League Baseball career stolen bases leaders
- List of Major League Baseball player-managers
