= Harry Hanson (baseball) =

American baseball player (1896-1966)

- Born: January 17, 1896; Elgin, Illinois
- Died: October 5, 1966 (aged 70); Savannah, Georgia
- Batted: Right Threw: Right

MLB debut
- July 14, 1913, for the New York Yankees

Last MLB appearance
- July 14, 1913, for the New York Yankees

MLB statistics
- Games played: 1
- At bats: 2
- Hits: 0
- Stats at Baseball Reference

Teams
- New York Yankees (1913)

Harry Francis Hanson (January 17, 1896 – October 6, 1966) was a Major League Baseball catcher. Hanley played for the New York Yankees in 1913. In 1 career game, he had no hits in 2 at-bats. He batted and threw right-handed.

Hanson was born in Elgin, Illinois and died in Savannah, Georgia.
