= Birdie Cree =

American baseball player (1882-1942)

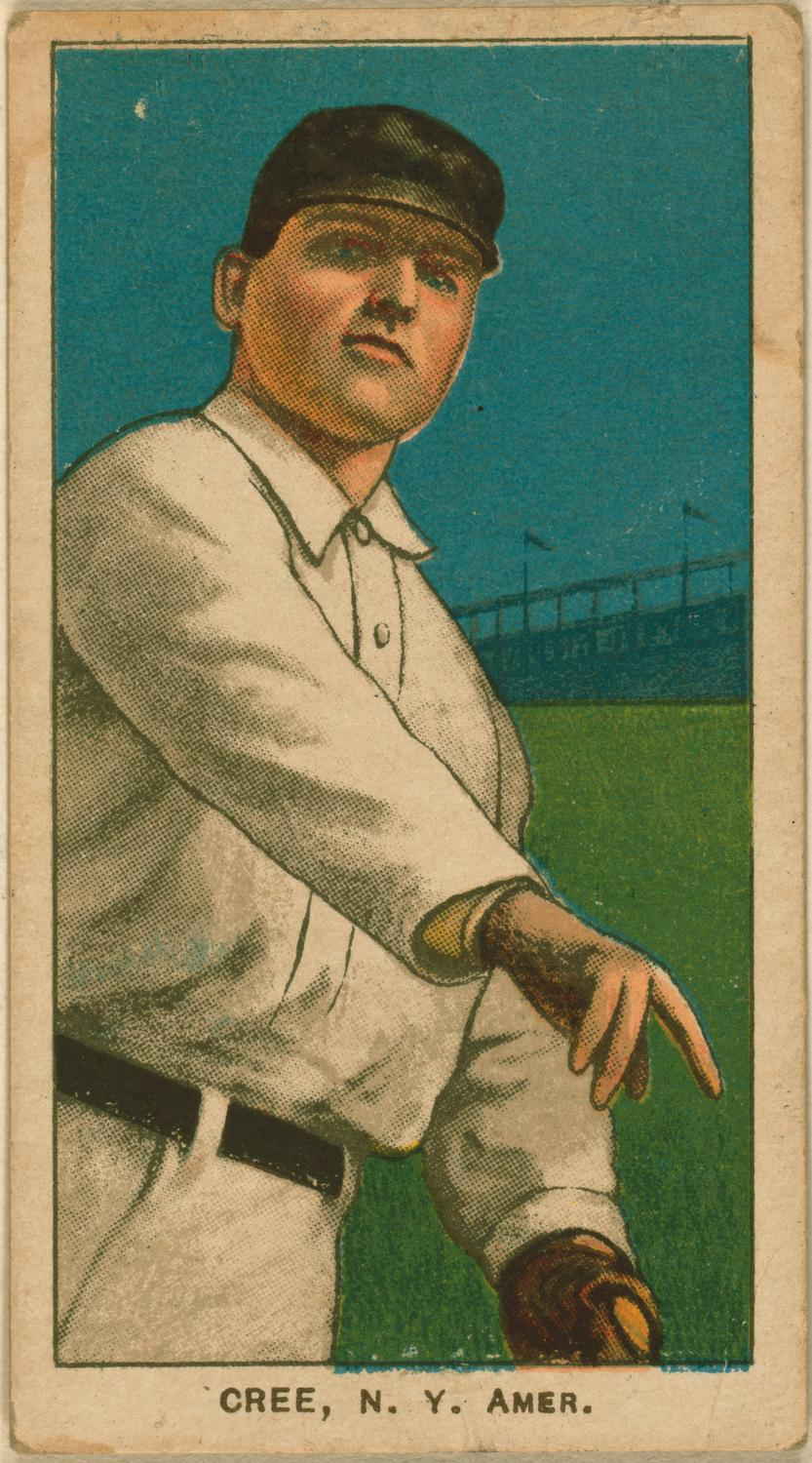
- Birdie Cree baseball card
- Outfielder
- Born: October 23, 1882; Khedive, Pennsylvania, U.S.
- Died: November 7, 1942 (aged 60); Sunbury, Pennsylvania, U.S.
- Batted: Right Threw: Right

MLB debut
- September 17, 1908, for the New York Highlanders

Last MLB appearance
- September 21, 1915, for the New York Yankees

MLB statistics
- Batting average: .292
- Home runs: 11
- Runs batted in: 332
- Stats at Baseball Reference

Teams
- New York Highlanders/Yankees (1908–1915)

William Franklin "Birdie" Cree (October 23, 1882 – November 7, 1942) was a Major League Baseball outfielder. He spent his entire eight-year career (1908–1915) with the New York Highlanders/Yankees.

== Life ==
Born in Khedive, Pennsylvania, Cree was a small man at 5 ft 6 in (1.68 m) and 150 pounds. He threw and batted right-handed, and he also attended Penn State University.

Prior to the major leagues, Cree played in the High Hat League, then went to play ball in Burlington, Vermont and Williamsport, Pennsylvania.

Cree made his major league debut on September 17, 1908 at the age of 25. He was a solid outfielder until 1911, when he had an extraordinary season. He had or tied career highs in every major category, with the highlights being 22 triples (which tied him for 32nd all-time in a season and the most in a season for a right-hander in the American League), 48 stolen bases and a .348 batting average. He was third in the league in stolen bases and because of his great performance, he was tied with Hall of Famer Tris Speaker for 6th highest in the voting for Most Valuable Player, and was the only non-Hall of Fame player in the top six in the voting. He also hit his only career grand slam in 1911.

Cree was on pace for a similar season in 1912, but it was cut short by a wrist injury from a Buck O'Brien pitch, and he played in only 50 games. He hit .332 during that time. On April 22, 1910 Cree was hit in the head by a pitch thrown by Walter Johnson.

Cree never again lived up to his 1911 season, playing over 100 games only once in the remaining four years of his career. Rejecting baseball disdainfully, he ended his career early on September 21, 1915 with a .292 career batting average, 132 stolen bases and 62 triples. In the field, Cree had a career .962 fielding percentage. Cree retired from baseball because, "I had no intention of going to the bush leagues". After baseball, he entered the world of banking. Jack Warhop and Ed Sweeney had been teammates of Cree for eight seasons, longer than any other teammates.

On November 7, 1942 at the age of 60, Cree died in Sunbury, Pennsylvania, after fighting a long illness. He was laid to rest in Pomfret Manor Cemetery in Sunbury, PA. At the time of his death, he was a cashier at the First National Bank of Sunbury.

On July 6, 1914, the Yankees sent Bill Holden and cash to Baltimore of the International League for Cree.
