= Jim Hanley (baseball) =

American baseball player (1885-1961)

- Pitcher
- Born: October 13, 1885; Providence, Rhode Island, U.S.
- Died: May 1, 1961 (aged 75); Elmhurst, New York, U.S.
- Batted: Right Threw: Left

MLB debut
- July 3, 1913, for the New York Yankees

Last MLB appearance
- July 3, 1913, for the New York Yankees

MLB statistics
- Win–loss record: 0–0
- Earned run average: 6.75
- Strikeouts: 2
- Stats at Baseball Reference

Teams
- New York Yankees (1913)

James Patrick Hanley (October 13, 1885 – May 1, 1961) was an American Major League Baseball pitcher. Hanley played for the New York Yankees in 1913. In one career game, he had a 0-0 record, with a 6.75 ERA. His career ended abruptly when a line drive struck him in the head, leaving him partially blind. He batted right-handed and threw left-handed.

Hanley was born in Providence, Rhode Island, and died in Elmhurst, New York.
