= Dan Costello (baseball) =

American baseball player (1891–1936)

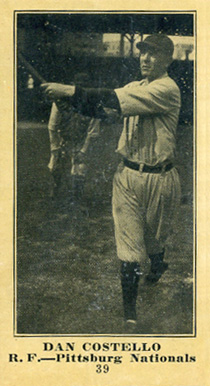
- Outfielder
- Born: September 9, 1891; Jessup, Pennsylvania, U.S.
- Died: March 26, 1936 (aged 44); Pittsburgh, Pennsylvania, U.S.
- Batted: Left Threw: Right

MLB debut
- July 2, 1913, for the New York Yankees

Last MLB appearance
- August 18, 1916, for the Pittsburgh Pirates

MLB statistics
- Batting average: .243
- Home runs: 0
- Runs batted in: 24
- Stats at Baseball Reference

Teams
- New York Yankees (1913); Pittsburgh Pirates (1914–1916)

Daniel Francis "Dashing Dan" Costello (September 9, 1891 – March 26, 1936) was an American Major League Baseball outfielder. Costello played for the New York Yankees and the Pittsburgh Pirates from 1913 to 1916. In 154 career games, he had 85 hits, 24 RBIs and a .243 batting average. He batted left and threw right-handed. Costello was born in Jessup, Pennsylvania, and died in Pittsburgh, Pennsylvania.
