= Roy Hartzell =

American baseball player

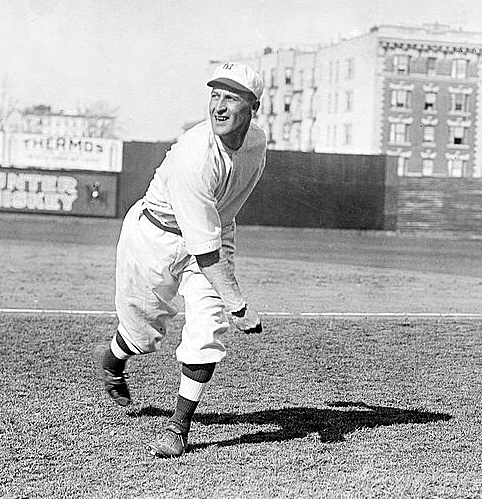
- Infielder / Outfielder
- Born: July 6, 1881; Golden, Colorado, U.S.
- Died: November 6, 1961 (aged 80); Golden, Colorado, U.S.
- Batted: Left Threw: Right

MLB debut
- April 17, 1906, for the St. Louis Browns

Last MLB appearance
- July 25, 1916, for the New York Yankees

MLB statistics
- Batting average: .252
- Runs batted in: 397
- Stolen bases: 182
- Stats at Baseball Reference

Teams
- St. Louis Browns (1906–1910); New York Highlanders / Yankees (1911–1916)

Roy Allen Hartzell (July 6, 1881 – November 6, 1961) was an American professional baseball player who played in Major League Baseball (MLB) from 1906 to 1916.

Hartzell started his career with the St. Louis Browns (now known as the Baltimore Orioles), and was later traded to the New York Highlanders (also now known the New York Yankees) for two other players, Jimmy Austin and Frank LaPorte.

== Early life ==
Hartzell was born on July 6, 1881, in Golden, Colorado. His parents were James and Nellie Hartzell, who were both from Illinois. James G. Hartzell was an American Civil War veteran who died and was buried in California. He had two brothers, Lester and Harry.

Hartzell played baseball and football in the Denver area. He worked in the smelters in Montana before signing with the pros. He later married Ella Stebbins in Philadelphia in April 1911.

== Major Leagues ==
Hartzell was 24 years old when he played his first game in the big leagues on April 17, 1906, with the St. Louis Browns. He played many positions including at second base, third base, shortstop, and in the outfield in each of his 11 seasons of baseball.

Hartzell played in 1,290 games with a lifetime batting average of .252. His last MLB game was on July 25, 1916. He signed on to play for the 1917 Toledo Iron Men of the American Association.

== Accomplishments ==
On July 12, 1911 when Hartzell was the cleanup hitter, he hit a 3-run double and another double in the same inning, then added a sacrifice fly and a grand slam, driving in a total of 8 runs. It was a Major League Baseball record until Jimmie Foxx hit 9 runs batted in during a game in 1933.

Hartzell's 595 at-bats for the Browns led the American League in 1909, and his 91 RBI for New York in 1911 were the most by a player in the Yankees' first 13 years.

== Later years ==
After retiring from baseball, Hartzell became an assistant safety manager of the Midwest Refinery Company in Casper, Wyoming in 1921, where he also served as manager of the company baseball team. Standard Oil purchased the company and in 1929, transferred Hartzell to Chicago, Illinois, where he remained in the same position until 1946. Hartzell died of a heart attack on November 6, 1961 in Golden, Colorado.

== See also ==
- List of Major League Baseball career stolen bases leaders
