= George Clark (baseball) =

American baseball player (1891-1940)

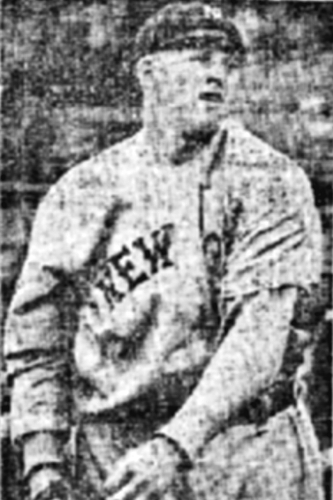
- Pitcher
- Born: May 19, 1891; Smithland, Iowa
- Died: November 14, 1940 (aged 49); Sioux City, Iowa
- Batted: Right Threw: Left

MLB debut
- May 16, 1913, for the New York Yankees

Last MLB appearance
- July 7, 1913, for the New York Yankees

MLB statistics
- Win–loss record: 0–1
- Earned run average: 9.00
- Strikeouts: 5
- Stats at Baseball Reference

Teams
- New York Yankees (1913)

George Myron Clark (May 19, 1891 – November 14, 1940) was a Major League Baseball pitcher. Clark played for the New York Yankees in 1913. In 11 career games, he had a 0–1 record with a 9.00 ERA. He batted right and threw left-handed.

Clark was born in Smithland, Iowa, and died in Sioux City, Iowa.
