= Walter Carlisle =

English baseball player (1881–1945)

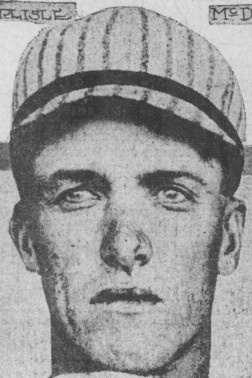
- Outfielder
- Born: 6 July 1881; Yorkshire, England
- Died: 27 May 1945 (aged 63); Los Angeles, California, U.S.
- Batted: Both Threw: Right

MLB debut
- May 8, 1908, for the Boston Red Sox

Last MLB appearance
- May 11, 1908, for the Boston Red Sox

MLB statistics
- Batting average: .100 (1-for-10)
- Stolen bases: 1
- Runs batted in: 0
- Stats at Baseball Reference

Teams
- Boston Red Sox (1908)

Walter Carlisle (6 July 1881 – 27 May 1945) was an English-born professional baseball outfielder in the United States in the early 20th century. He played briefly in Major League Baseball (MLB) for the Boston Red Sox during the 1908 season. Nicknamed "Rosy", he was a switch-hitter and threw right-handed. Carlisle is best remembered for successfully executing an unassisted triple play as an outfielder in 1911.

== Biography ==
Carlisle was born in Yorkshire, England, and played baseball professionally in the United States during 1902–1918, 1920, and 1923. He played in over 2200 minor league games; records for some of his minor-league seasons are missing or incomplete. For seasons with records available, he had a career-high batting average of .304 in 150 games for the Lincoln Tigers of the Western League in 1916.

Carlisle is credited with playing in three major league games, all in May 1908 as a left fielder for the Boston Red Sox. (Note: Retrosheet indicates that Carlisle appeared in a fourth and final major league game on May 15, 1908, as a pinch runner.) He registered one hit in 10 at bats while striking out four times; he also had one stolen base.

While playing in the Pacific Coast League for the Vernon Tigers, Carlisle executed an unassisted triple play on July 19, 1911, against Los Angeles Angels. With the score tied at 3–3 in the sixth inning, and runners on first and second bases, Carlisle made a diving catch of a short fly batted by Roy Akin, stepped on second to retire Charley Moore, and tagged George Metzger coming from first. The Tigers won the game, 5–4. With his rare feat, Carlisle entered the record books as the first, and to date only, outfielder known to have made an unassisted triple play in professional baseball. According to The Sporting News, Carlisle had at one point been a circus acrobat, which may have helped account for the bit of extra athleticism he showed in making the tumbling play. During the following season, Akin pulled off his own unassisted triple play, as a third baseman.

Carlisle died in Los Angeles, California, at the age of 63.

== See also ==
- List of players from England in Major League Baseball
