= Jay Rogers =

American baseball player (1888-1964)

- Catcher
- Born: August 3, 1888; Sandusky, New York
- Died: July 1, 1964 (aged 75); Carlisle, Pennsylvania
- Batted: Right Threw: Right

MLB debut
- May 22, 1914, for the New York Yankees

Last MLB appearance
- June 26, 1914, for the New York Yankees

MLB statistics
- Games played: 5
- At bats: 8
- Hits: 0
- Stats at Baseball Reference

Teams
- New York Yankees (1914)

Jay Lewis Rogers (August 3, 1888 to July 1, 1964) was a Major League Baseball catcher. Rogers played for the New York Yankees in the 1914 season. In five games, he had no hits in 8 at-bats, playing catcher. He batted and threw right-handed.

He was born in Sandusky, New York. Rogers served as a first lieutenant with the infantry during World War I. Rogers died at Carlisle Hospital in Carlisle, Pennsylvania on July 1, 1964. His funeral would be held at Temple Hill Cemetery in Geneseo, New York.
