= Cy Pieh =

American baseball player (1886-1945)

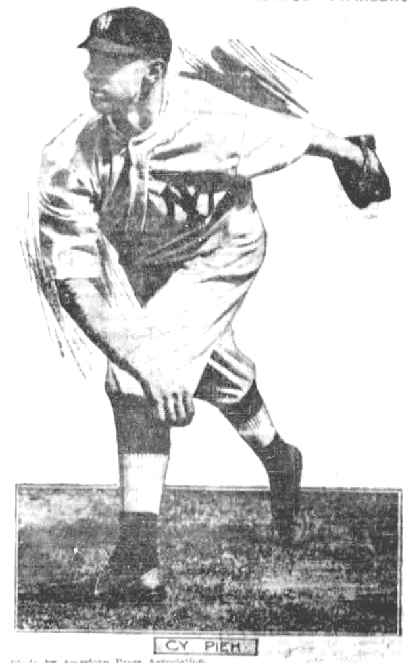
- Pitcher
- Born: September 29, 1886; Waunakee, Wisconsin, U.S.
- Died: September 12, 1945 (aged 58); Jacksonville, Florida, U.S.
- Batted: Right Threw: Right

MLB debut
- September 6, 1913, for the New York Yankees

Last MLB appearance
- September 25, 1915, for the New York Yankees

MLB statistics
- Win–loss record: 9–9
- Earned run average: 3.78
- Strikeouts: 76
- Stats at Baseball Reference

Teams
- New York Yankees (1913–1915)

Edwin John "Cy" Pieh (September 29, 1886 – September 12, 1945) was a Major League Baseball pitcher who played from 1913 to 1915 with the New York Yankees. He was a right-handed batter and pitcher. His nickname "Cy" was short for "Cyclone" because his corkscrew-style of pitching motion was said to resemble that of a cyclone.

He was born in Waunakee, Wisconsin, and his family moved to Enderlin, North Dakota when he was a child. He died in Jacksonville, Florida and was buried in Enderlin.
