= Guy Cooper =

American baseball player (1893–1951)

- Pitcher
- Born: January 28, 1893; Rome, Georgia, U.S.
- Died: August 2, 1951 (aged 58); Santa Monica, California, U.S.
- Batted: Switch Threw: Right

MLB debut
- May 2, 1914, for the New York Yankees

Last MLB appearance
- September 24, 1915, for the Boston Red Sox

MLB statistics
- Win–loss record: 1–0
- Strikeouts: 8
- Earned run average: 5.33
- Stats at Baseball Reference

Teams
- New York Yankees (1914); Boston Red Sox (1914–1915)

Guy Evans Cooper (January 28, 1893 – August 2, 1951), nicknamed "Rebel", was an American pitcher in Major League Baseball who played from 1914 through 1915 for the New York Yankees (1914–15) and Boston Red Sox (1915). Listed at 6 ft 1 in (1.85 m), 185 lb., Cooper was a switch-hitter and threw right-handed. He was born in Rome, Georgia.

In a two-season career, Cooper posted a 1–0 record with eight strikeouts and a 5.33 ERA in 11 appearances, including one start, seven games finished, and 27.0 innings pitched.

He managed the Ogden team in the Utah–Idaho League for part of the 1926 season.

Cooper died in Santa Monica, California at age 58. He was interred at Woodlawn Memorial Cemetery.
