= Dick Gossett =

American baseball player (1890-1962)

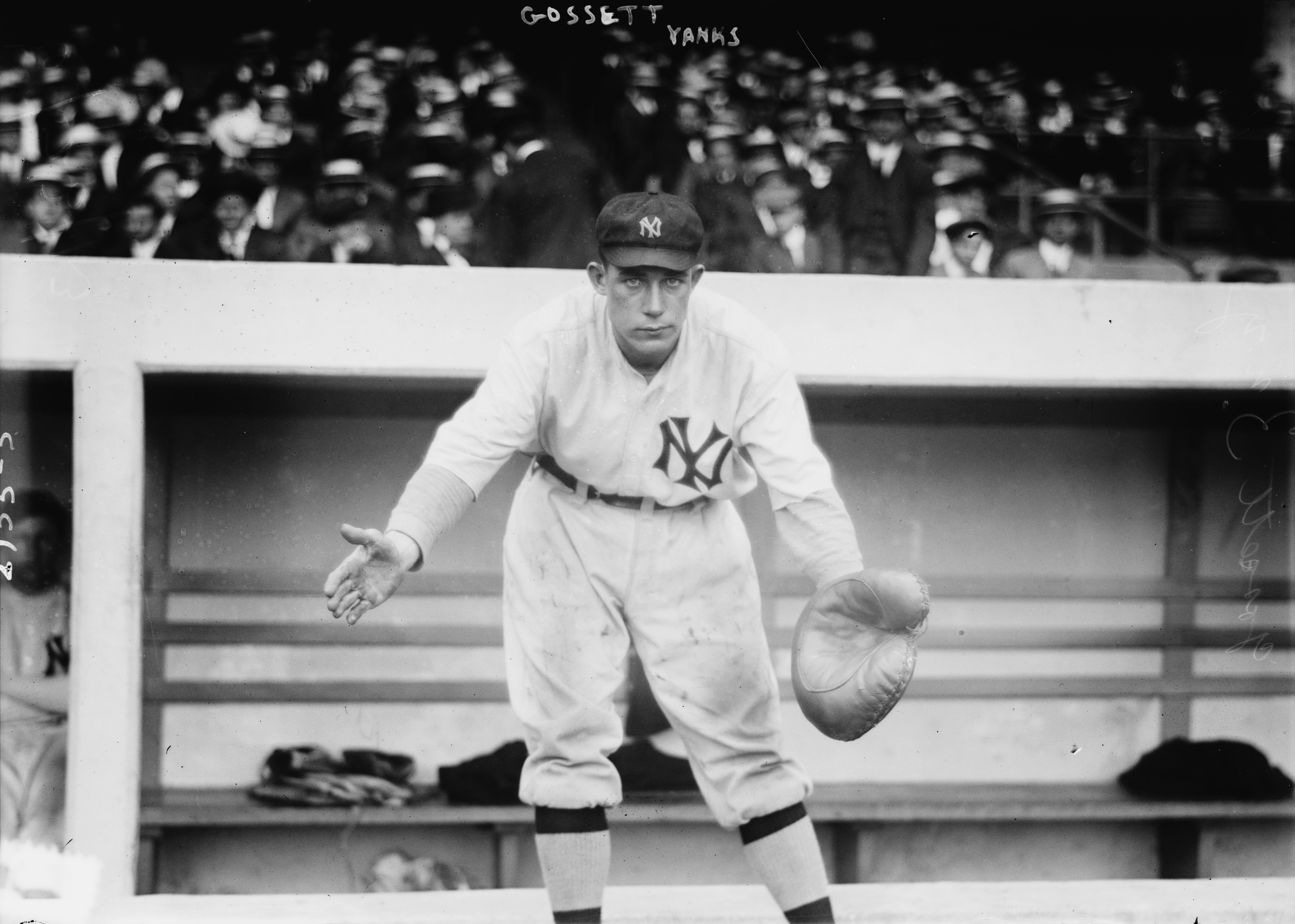
- Catcher
- Born: August 21, 1890; Dennison, Ohio
- Died: October 6, 1962 (aged 72); Massillon, Ohio
- Batted: Right Threw: Right

MLB debut
- April 30, 1913, for the New York Yankees

Last MLB appearance
- October 6, 1914, for the New York Yankees

MLB statistics
- Batting average: .159
- Home runs: 0
- Runs batted in: 10
- Stats at Baseball Reference

Teams
- New York Yankees (1913–1914)

John Star "Dick" Gossett (August 21, 1890 – October 6, 1962) was a Major League Baseball catcher who played for the New York Yankees in 1913 and 1914. In 49 career major league games, he had 20 hits in 126 at-bats, with 10 RBIs. Gossett played professionally from 1911 to 1923, spending multiple seasons with the Indianapolis Indians and Milwaukee Brewers of the American Association.

== Early life and career ==
Gossett was born on August 21, 1890 in Dennison, Ohio. In 1910, Gossett tried out for the Newark Newks of the Ohio State League during spring training, but did not make the team. He instead played for the Sunnyside ball club in New Philadelphia, Ohio. In 1911, he joined the St. Joseph Drummers of the Western League. He remained with the club the following season.

Gossett was recruited by the American League's Chicago White Sox in 1913 and played with the club in spring training. He was acquired by the New York Yankees on April 26. He made his major league debut on April 30, going hitless in one at bat after replacing catcher Ed Sweeney in the eighth inning in a game against the Boston Red Sox. He appeared in 39 games for New York that season, recording a .205 batting average with seven runs batted in.

He re-signed with the Yankees in January 1914. While playing an exhibition game on March 25, he sprained his ankle while attempting to throw to second base. After missing several weeks, he made his season debut on May 21 against the Cleveland Indians. The Yankees released Gossett to the American Association's Indianapolis Indians on June 27 after he appeared in 10 games, going 3-21 for a .143 batting average.

== Later life and death ==
Following his release from the Yankees, Gossett remained with Indianapolis through the 1920 season. He began 1921 with Indianapolis, but was with Milwaukee Brewers on April 23. He played his final year with Milwaukee in 1923. In 1924 and 1925, he played for the Massillon Agathons.

Gossett died on October 6, 1962 in Massillon, Ohio.
