= Bill Reynolds (catcher) =

American baseball player (1884-1924)

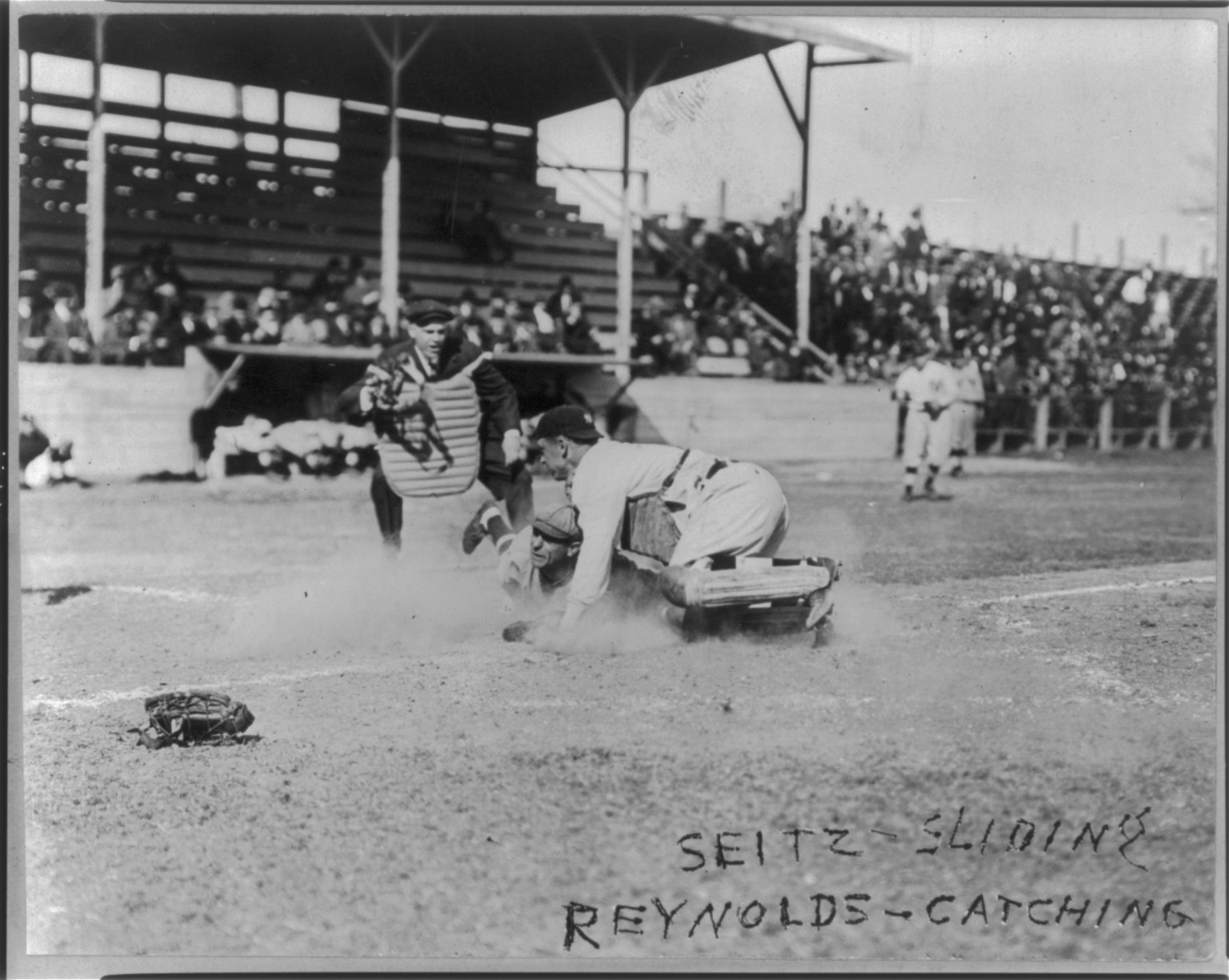
- Catcher
- Born: August 14, 1884; Eastland, Texas, U.S.
- Died: June 5, 1924 (aged 39); Carnegie, Oklahoma, U.S.
- Batted: Right Threw: Right

MLB debut
- September 15, 1913, for the New York Yankees

Last MLB appearance
- May 8, 1914, for the New York Yankees

MLB statistics
- Batting average: .200
- Home runs: 0
- RBI: 0
- Stats at Baseball Reference

Teams
- New York Yankees (1913–1914)

William Dee Reynolds (August 14, 1884 – June 5, 1924) was an American catcher in Major League Baseball for the New York Yankees from 1913 to 1914. He was later a manager in the minor leagues for the Waco Indians of the Texas Association in 1923.

Reynolds got sick in November 1923 and had been limited to his bed for five to six months. Despite a hopeful prognosis, Reynolds died at his home in Carnegie, Oklahoma on June 5, 1924.
