= Harry Williams (first baseman) =

American baseball player (1890–1963)

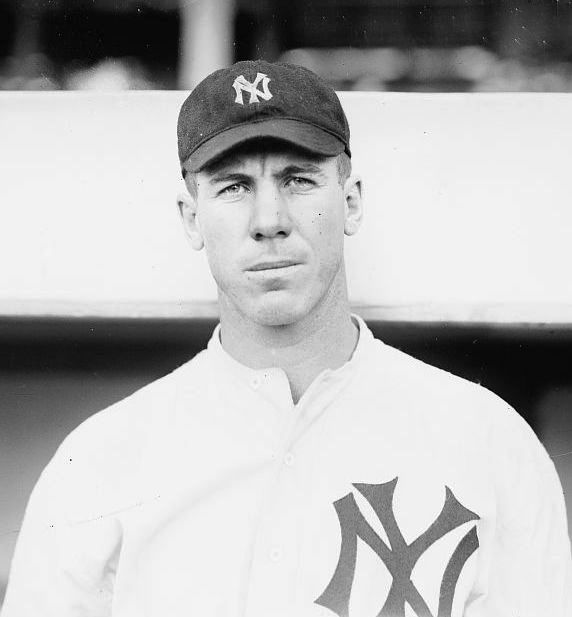
- Williams in uniform
- First baseman
- Born: June 23, 1890; Omaha, Nebraska, U.S.
- Died: December 21, 1963 (aged 73); Huntington Park, California, U.S.
- Batted: Right Threw: Right

MLB debut
- August 7, 1913, for the New York Yankees

Last MLB appearance
- June 30, 1914, for the New York Yankees

MLB statistics
- Batting average: .192
- Home runs: 2
- Runs batted in: 29
- Stats at Baseball Reference

Teams
- New York Yankees (1913–1914)

Harry Peter Williams (June 23, 1890 – December 21, 1963) was an American professional baseball player. Born in Omaha, Nebraska, he played a total of 85 games over two years for the New York Yankees as a first baseman. He made his major league debut on August 7, 1913 and played his last game June 30, 1914. The six foot, one inch tall Williams had a career batting average of .192 with 29 runs batted in over 260 at bats. The right-handed hitter and fielder hit two home runs, three triples, and eight doubles while stealing nine bases.

Harry Williams died on December 21, 1963, at the age of 73 in Huntington Park, California of leukemia, and was buried at the Holy Sepulchre Cemetery in his hometown of Omaha. His brother, Gus Williams, also played in the Major Leagues.
