= Les Channell =

American baseball player (1886-1954)

- Outfielder
- Born: March 3, 1886; Crestline, Ohio, U.S.
- Died: May 8, 1954 (aged 68); Denver, Colorado, U.S.
- Batted: Left Threw: Left

MLB debut
- May 11, 1910, for the New York Highlanders

Last MLB appearance
- April 18, 1914, for the New York Yankees

MLB statistics
- Batting average: .350
- Home runs: 0
- Runs batted in: 3
- Stats at Baseball Reference

Teams
- New York Highlanders/New York Yankees (1910, 1914)

Lester Clark (Goat) Channell (March 3, 1886 – May 8, 1954) was an American Major League Baseball outfielder. Channell played for the New York Highlanders/New York Yankees in 1910 and 1914. In 7 career games, he had seven hits in 20 at-bats, with three RBIs. He batted and threw left-handed.

Channell was born in Crestline, Ohio. After baseball, Channel worked on a ranch in Fort Morgan, Colorado from 1928–1938. Channell moved to Aurora, Colorado, where he became the police chief in 1941. Channell died in Denver, Colorado after a long illness.
