= Charlie Mullen =

American baseball player (1889–1963)

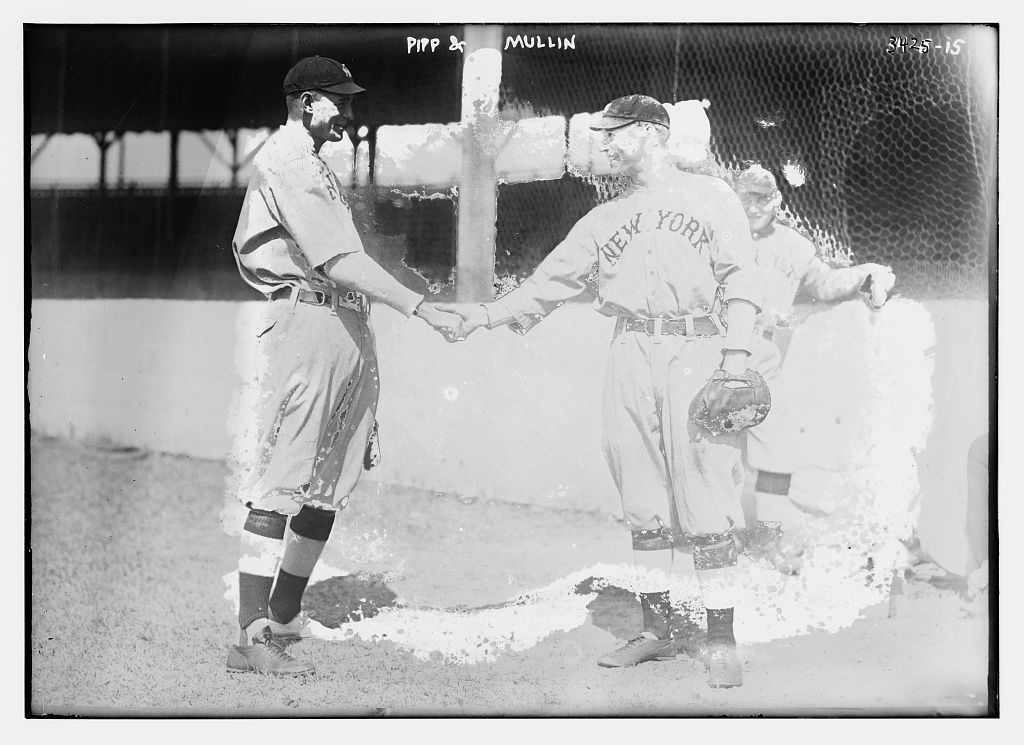
- Mullen on the right with Wally Pipp
- First baseman
- Born: March 15, 1889; Seattle, Washington Territory
- Died: June 6, 1963 (aged 74); Seattle, Washington, U.S.
- Batted: Right Threw: Right

MLB debut
- May 18, 1910, for the Chicago White Sox

Last MLB appearance
- September 30, 1916, for the New York Yankees

MLB statistics
- Batting average: .247
- Home runs: 0
- Runs batted in: 87
- Stats at Baseball Reference

Teams
- Chicago White Sox (1910–1911); New York Yankees (1914–1916)

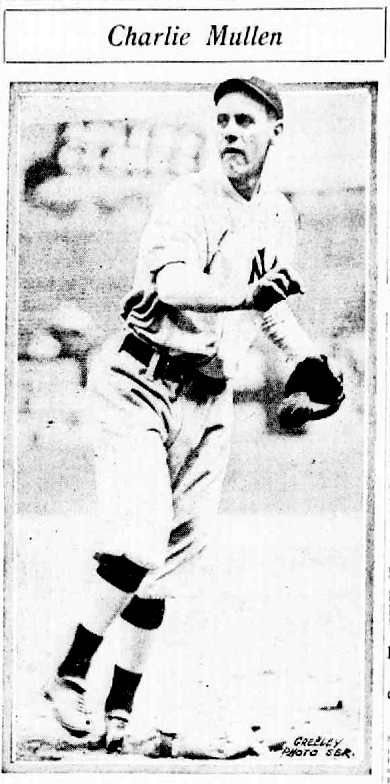
Newspaper photo of Mullen

Charles George Mullen (March 15, 1889 – June 6, 1963) was an American baseball player and manager. He played professionally in Major League Baseball (MLB) as a first baseman. From 1910 to 1911, Mullen played for the Chicago White Sox, who kept him at first base almost exclusively throughout his two seasons with the team. After a three-year absence, Mullen came back to the major leagues for play for the New York Yankees from 1914 to 1916. He had 183 hits in 741 at bats and 87 RBIs.

Mullen attended the University of Washington, where he captained the baseball team. In 1918, he was commissioned as a lieutenant in the United States Army, and was stationed at Fort Lewis near Tacoma, Washington.

Mullen died in Seattle.
