= Lute Boone =

American baseball player (1890–1982)

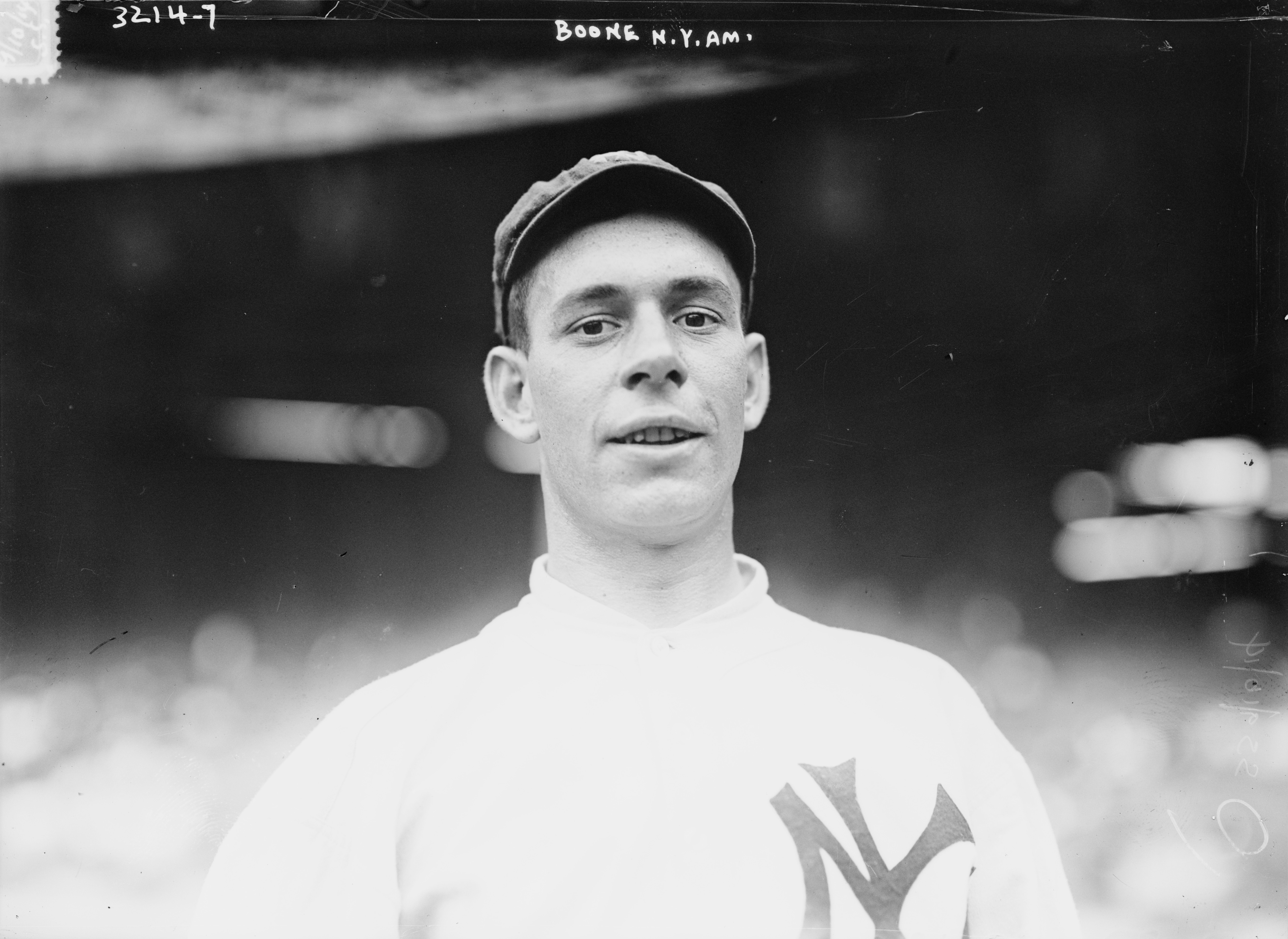
- Infielder
- Born: May 6, 1890; Pittsburgh, Pennsylvania, U.S.
- Died: July 29, 1982 (aged 92); Pittsburgh, Pennsylvania, U.S.
- Batted: Right Threw: Right

MLB debut
- September 9, 1913, for the New York Yankees

Last MLB appearance
- September 2, 1918, for the Pittsburgh Pirates

MLB statistics
- Batting average: .209
- Home runs: 6
- Runs batted in: 76
- Stats at Baseball Reference

Teams
- New York Yankees (1913–1916); Pittsburgh Pirates (1918)

Lutellus Joseph Boone (May 6, 1890 – July 29, 1982) was an American professional baseball infielder.

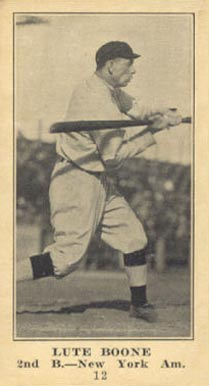

He played in Major League Baseball from 1913 to 1918 for the New York Yankees and Pittsburgh Pirates. He worked after his baseball career ended as a pattern maker for the Mesta Machine Company in Homestead, Pennsylvania a suburb of Pittsburgh. From 1960 to 1962, Boone was the president of the Pittsburgh Professional Baseball Association.

Boone died on July 29, 1982 in Brentwood, Pennsylvania at the age of 92.
