= Bill Holden (baseball) =

American baseball player (1889–1971)

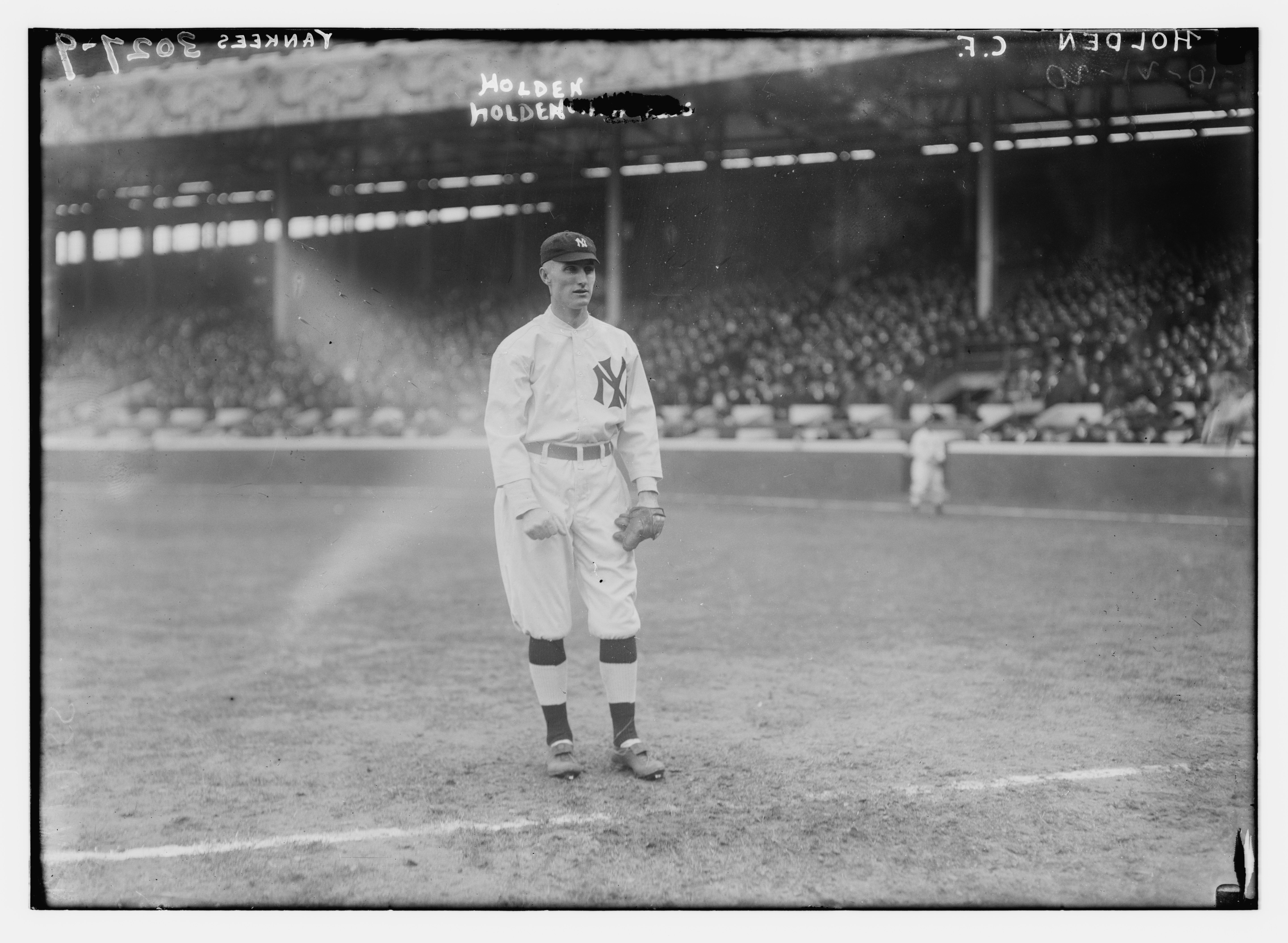
- Outfielder
- Born: September 7, 1889; Birmingham, Alabama, U.S.
- Died: September 14, 1971 (aged 82); Pensacola, Florida, U.S.
- Batted: Right Threw: Right

MLB debut
- September 11, 1913, for the New York Yankees

Last MLB appearance
- September 25, 1914, for the Cincinnati Reds

MLB statistics
- Batting average: .211
- Home runs: 0
- Runs batted in: 21
- Stats at Baseball Reference

Teams
- New York Yankees (1913–1914); Cincinnati Reds (1914)

William Paul Holden (September 7, 1889 – September 14, 1971) was an American right-handed Major League Baseball outfielder who played in 1913 and 1914 for the New York Yankees and Cincinnati Reds.

Standing at 6 ft 0 in (1.83 m) and weighing 170 pounds, Holden made his big-league debut on September 11, 1913, at the age of 23. He was impressive in the 18 games he played in 1913, batting .302 in 53 at-bats, walking eight times and striking out five times.

That success did not carry over into 1914, though. He started the season off with the Yankees, hitting .182 in 50 games with them. On July 6 of that year, he was sent to the Baltimore Orioles of the International League. On September 15 of that year, he was signed as a free-agent by the Reds, and in 28 at-bats with them he hit .214. He finished the season hitting .187.

He played his final Major League game on September 25, 1914. In 79 career games, Holden hit .211 in 246 at-bats. He collected 52 hits, six of which were doubles and three of which were triples. He scored 20 runs, drove 21 runs in, and he stole two bases. He walked 27 times and struck out 36 times. He committed three errors in his career for a .981 fielding percentage.

He remained active in the minor leagues through 1927 and had two stints as a player/manager in the minors, with the 1925 Knoxville Smokies and the 1927 Pensacola Pilots.

He died in 1971 and is buried in Pfeiffer Cemetery in Pensacola.
