= Jack Warhop =

American baseball player (1884–1960)

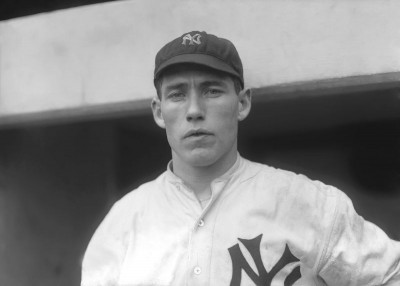
- Pitcher
- Born: July 4, 1884; Hinton, West Virginia, U.S.
- Died: October 4, 1960 (aged 76); Freeport, Illinois, U.S.
- Batted: Right Threw: Right

MLB debut
- September 19, 1908, for the New York Highlanders

Last MLB appearance
- August 12, 1915, for the New York Yankees

MLB statistics
- Win–loss record: 69–92
- Earned run average: 3.12
- Strikeouts: 463
- Stats at Baseball Reference

Teams
- New York Highlanders / Yankees (1908–1915)

John Milton Warhop (July 4, 1884 – October 4, 1960) was an American professional baseball pitcher who played eight seasons in Major League Baseball (MLB) from 1908 to 1915 for the New York Highlanders / Yankees.

Considered by baseball insiders and historians as an unlucky pitcher, Warhop had a career 69–92 win–loss record, but with a 3.12 earned run average while playing for mostly second division Highlanders/Yankees teams. Of his 92 losses, the Yankees did not score a run in 23, and he holds the MLB record for losing the most 1–0 games with five in 1914. In 1915, Warhop allowed Babe Ruth's first two career home runs. He was released after the 1915 season and played a number of seasons in minor league baseball and semi-professional teams until his late 40s or early 50s.

Warhop had an underhand submarine delivery, which gave him the nickname "Crab" and was also known for his rather small size.

== Early life ==
Warhop was born in Hinton, West Virginia. He spent his early life working as a fireman for the Chesapeake and Ohio Railway. Warhop played for local semi-professional teams sponsored by the railway company. He drew the attention of several minor league teams, and in 1906, Warhop signed with the Class-D Freeport Pretzels of the Wisconsin–Illinois League in 1906 to start his professional career. His debut campaign included a no-hitter on Independence Day against the La Crosse Pinks. From 1906 to 1908, Warhop had an 82–20 win–loss record and 330 strikeouts, with a career high 30 wins in 1907. After pitching to a 29–7 record for the Williamsport Millionaires in 1909, people throughout both the National League and American League started to take notice of his ability. As many as a dozen teams were interested in Warhop, and he signed a $1,000 contract ($35,833 in today's dollars) with the Detroit Tigers. However, they soon sold Warhop to the Highlanders without appearing in a single game with the Tigers.

== Major League Baseball career ==
=== 1908–1912 ===
Warhop made his debut on September 9, 1908. He ended up with a 1–2 win–loss record with a 4.46 earned run average (ERA) in five games that year. Warhop became a regular fixture in the starting rotation in 1909. He pitched a three hitter against the Cleveland Nats on August 10, 1909, and finished the year with a 13–15 win–loss record, a 2.40 ERA, and 21 complete games in 36 games pitched as the Highlanders finished fifth in the American League (AL). However, Warhop led the AL in hit batsmen in 1909 (26) and 1910 (18), which might have been caused by his unorthodox pitching style. In 1910, Warhop pitched to a 14–14 win–loss record, a 3.00 ERA and 11 errors (the most among AL pitchers). He was respected throughout baseball, and Baseball Magazine once called him the "unluckiest pitcher in the American League".

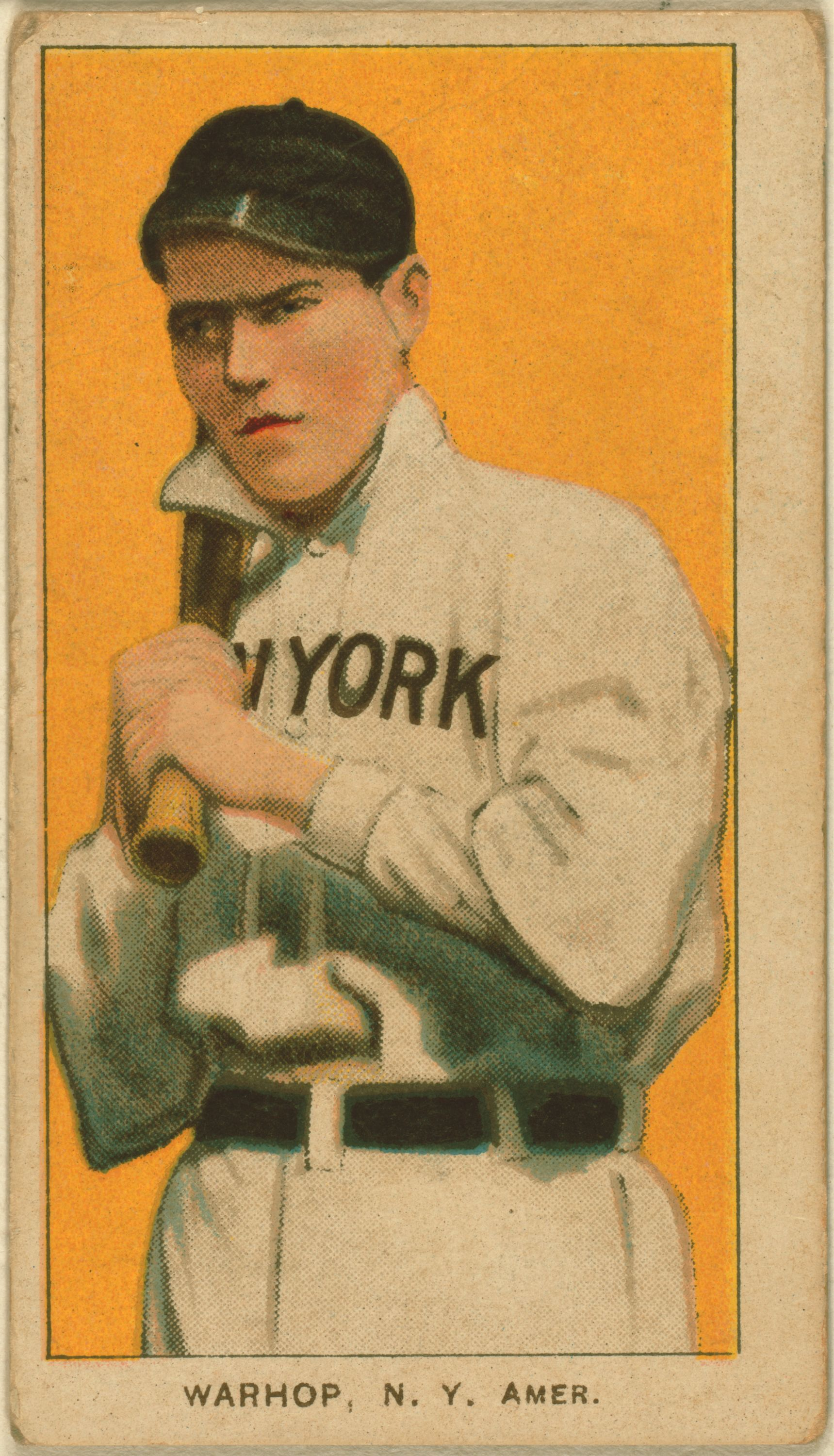
Tobacco card of Jack Warhop

The 1911 season saw Warhop post a 12–13 record, a 4.16 ERA and 15 hit batsmen (the third highest in the league). His starts throughout the season were mixed; some were poor or marred by bad luck. He was shelled on May 9 in a 10–0 loss against a Detroit Tigers lineup featuring Ty Cobb, Sam Crawford and Jim Delahanty, giving up runs in each of the first four innings. However, he improved a few weeks later on May 20, when he limited the St. Louis Browns to four hits. This began a quality stretch for Warhop, who won five consecutive games by July 17, a result of an improvement in his control. Then, during an August 21 road game against the Tigers, he lost a 5–4 walk-off game in the eleventh inning, in part due to his own unsuccessful strategy in fielding two bunts. On both occasions, he threw to second base but was too late, and the baserunners were able to advance safely and load the bases. The Highlanders lost when Earle Gardner booted a routine ground ball by Bill Donovan in a rushed attempt to throw out the go-ahead runner at home plate. At the end of the season his desperation culminated in him unsuccessfully requesting that the league change his win–loss record to 14–11, under the mistaken belief that his 12–13 record was incorrect.

Warhop's penchant for tough luck was best exemplified in the 1912 season, when he finished with a 10–19 record, the second highest number of losses in the AL, despite compiling a 2.86 ERA and 6.7 Wins Above Replacement (WAR). Both his ERA and WAR were tenth best in the AL, though he also finished second in hit batsmen (16) and fifth in errors as a pitcher (7). In a July 5 road game against the Washington Senators, he entered the game in the second inning and lost 6–5 in a walk-off, despite dueling Walter Johnson up to the 16th inning. Then, in a game on August 22, he held the Chicago White Sox to just two hits and no runs in the first five innings. While pitching with a 3–0 lead, Warhop surrendered one run in the sixth inning, before getting shelled in the seventh, giving up four runs and the lead. After another four runs were given up in the ninth inning, the Highlanders lost the game 9–4. Towards the end of the season, Warhop was again on the losing side of a bad luck game, when he lost a 3–0 pitchers' duel against the St. Louis Browns, having held them scoreless for the first five innings.

=== 1913–1915 ===
A sore arm in 1913 caused Warhop to pitch ineffectively and have just seven games started. He recovered by 1914; however, Warhop was on the unfortunate end of a hard-luck campaign. He had an 8–15 win–loss record with a 2.37 ERA. However, the Yankees were one of the worst offensive and defensive teams in baseball, which caused Warhop to be on the losing end of five 1–0 games, a present-day Major League Baseball record shared with five other pitchers. In one of those games, on July 25, Warhop shutout the Chicago White Sox for twelve innings before losing 1–0 in the 13th, due to two errors—one of which was committed by himself on an errant throw to first base after a sacrifice bunt. His first win of the season finally came on June 25 against the Boston Red Sox. He led the American League in home runs allowed at the end of the season with eight, a very high number in the dead-ball era. His pitching style included an underhand, submarine delivery, which he abandoned by 1914.

He gave up Babe Ruth's first career home run on May 6, 1915, while Ruth was a member of the Boston Red Sox. Warhop threw a fastball in the third inning, and Ruth hit the ball to the upper right field stands. Warhop won the game 4–3 in extra innings. When interviewed about it many years later, Warhop shrugged it off, stating "that's one way to be remembered". A little over three weeks later, on June 2, he gave up Ruth's second career home run in a 7–1 Yankee defeat. In what would be his final season in Major League Baseball, Warhop had a 7–9 win–loss record and a 3.96 ERA, while leading the American League in home runs allowed (7) for the second consecutive year. He was released alongside first baseman Charlie Mullen and catcher Ed Sweeney on August 14 and then sold to Jack Dunn of the Richmond Climbers in the International League, but Warhop didn't play a game with them. According to one historian, however, Warhop was released because Yankee management thought he was a "jinx" to the club, as during Warhop's tenure—with the exception of the 1910 season—the Highlanders/Yankees finished no higher than fifth in the division.

Warhop led the Yankees in games pitched four times (1908, 1909, 1912, 1914), saves three times (1909, 1910, 1912), and complete games once (1909). His 114 career hit batsmen is a Yankees team record and ranks in the top 100 on the MLB all-time hit batsmen list.

== Later life ==
After leaving the Yankees, Warhop played in the minor leagues, including stints in the Pacific Coast League and the International League, until the late 1920s. He was player–manager for the Class-B Norfolk Tars of the Virginia League in 1921 and won 20 games for the team. In 1927, he pitched and won both games of a doubleheader, a rare achievement, while with Bridgeport of the Eastern League at age 42. In 1928, Warhop became the manager for the Sally League Spartanburg team. He played semi-professional baseball until the age of 50, when he retired and became a butler for a large house in Long Island.

He married Grace Nichols on November 23, 1907. They later divorced, and he married Frances Helsinger in 1918. Warhop died on October 4, 1960, at age 76 in Freeport, Illinois, where his professional baseball career began.

== See also ==
- List of Major League Baseball career hit batsmen leaders
