= Doc Cook (baseball) =

American baseball player (1886-1973)

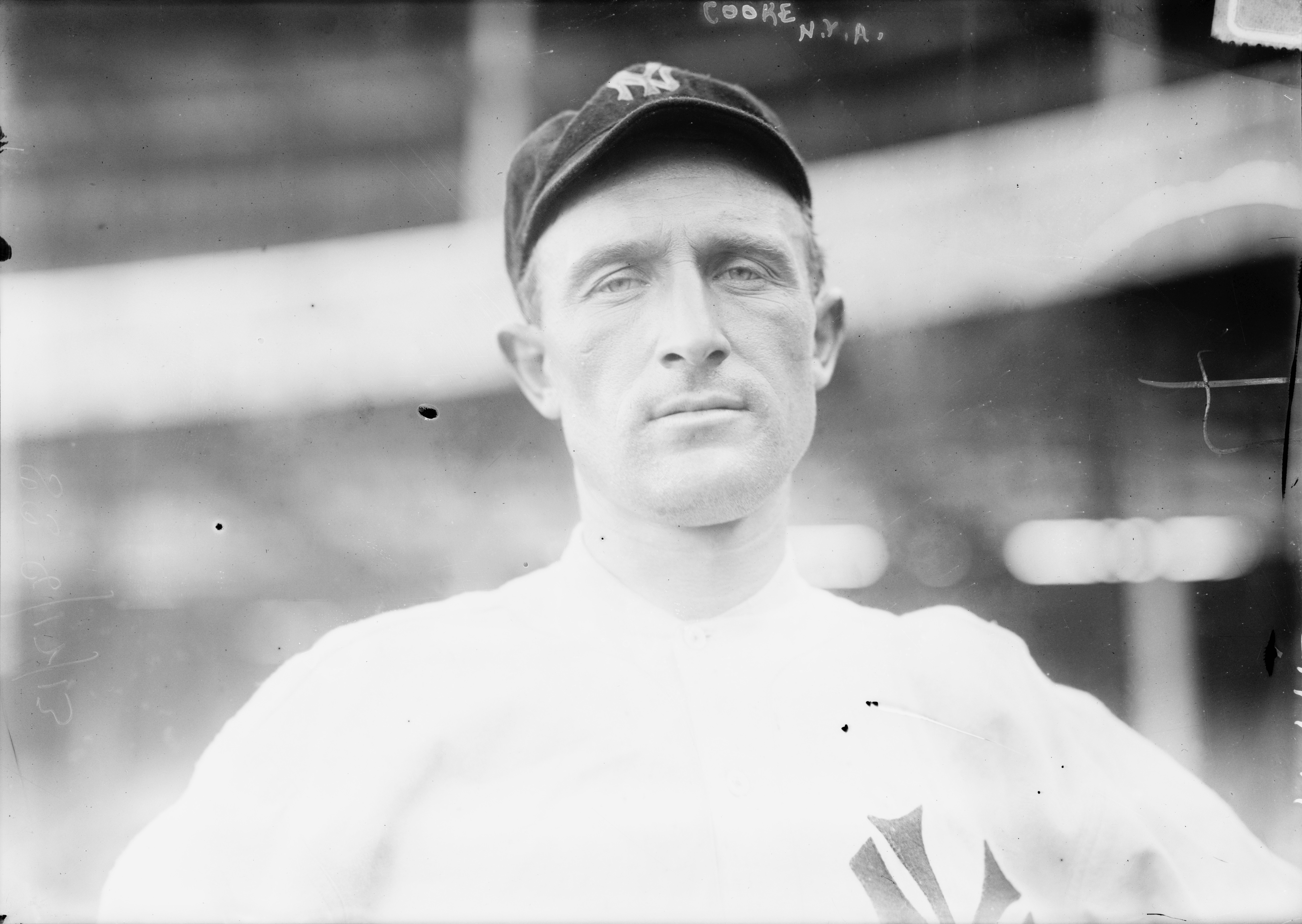
- Outfielder
- Born: June 24, 1886; Whitt, Texas, U.S.
- Died: June 30, 1973 (aged 87); Lawrenceburg, Tennessee, U.S.
- Batted: Left Threw: Right

MLB debut
- August 7, 1913, for the New York Yankees

Last MLB appearance
- April 25, 1916, for the New York Yankees

MLB statistics
- Batting average: .274
- Home runs: 3
- Runs batted in: 75
- Stats at Baseball Reference

Teams
- New York Yankees (1913–1916)

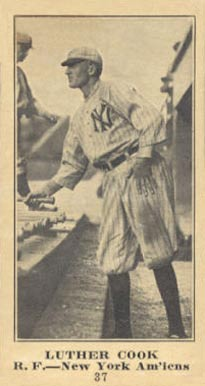

Luther Almus "Doc" Cook (June 24, 1886 – June 30, 1973) was an American Major League Baseball outfielder. Cook played for the New York Yankees from 1913 to 1916. In 288 career games, he had a .274 batting average with three home runs and 75 RBI.

He batted left and threw right-handed. He was born in Whitt, Texas and died in Lawrenceburg, Tennessee.

Cook attended Vanderbilt University.
