= 1915 New York Yankees season =

Season for the Major League Baseball team the New York Yankees

1915 New York Yankees
- League: American League
- Ballpark: Polo Grounds
- City: New York City
- Record: 69–83 (.454)
- League place: 5th
- Owners: Jacob Ruppert and Tillinghast L'Hommedieu Huston
- Managers: Bill Donovan

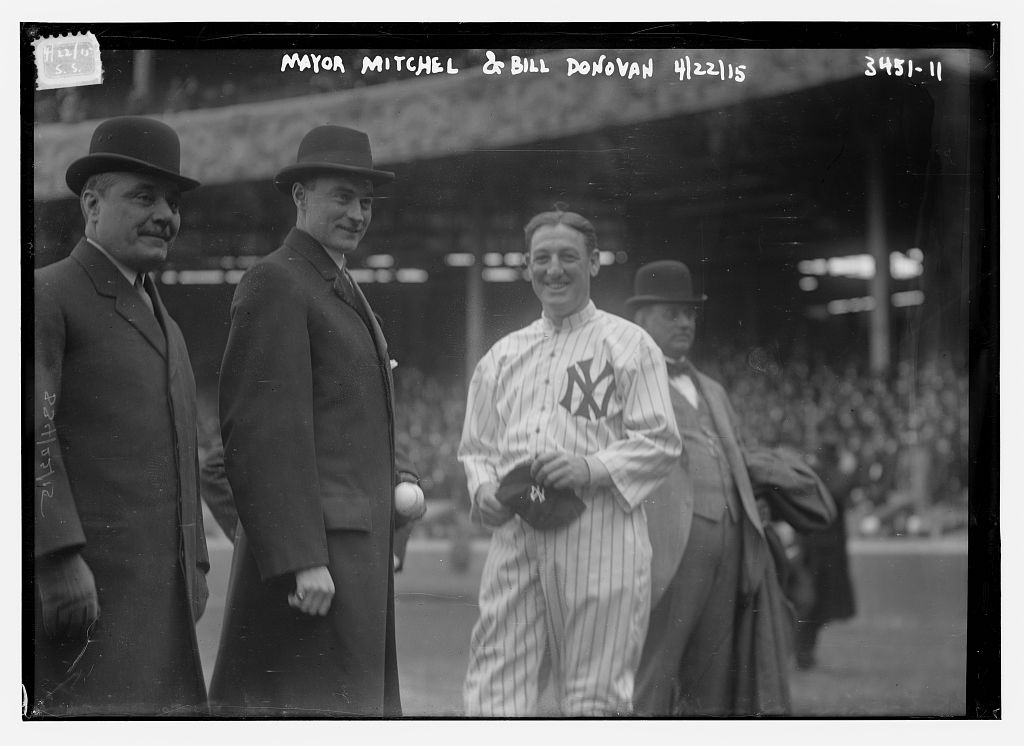
John Purroy Mitchel and Jacob Ruppert, Jr. and William Edward Donovan at a Yankee game on April 22, 1915

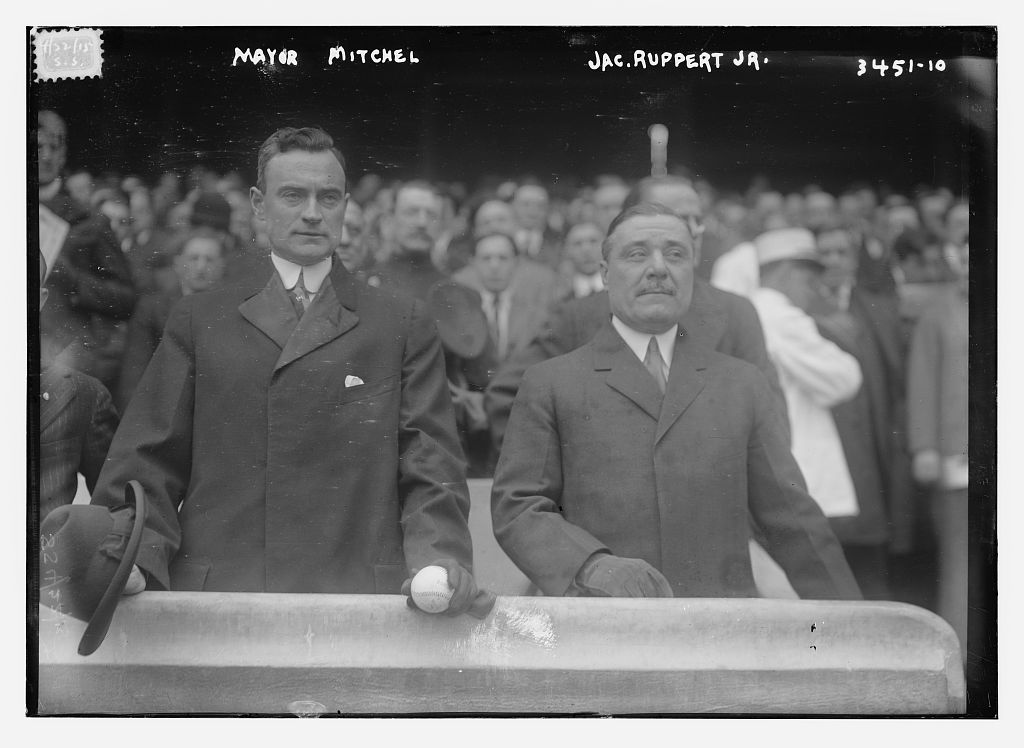
John Purroy Mitchel holding his Homburg hat and Jacob Ruppert, Jr. at the opening day Yankee game at the Polo Grounds on April 22, 1915, with Mitchel getting ready to throw out the ceremonial first pitch

The 1915 New York Yankees season was the 13th season for the Yankees and their 15th overall. The team was under new ownership and new management.

The team finished with a record of 69–83, 32½ games behind the American League champion Boston Red Sox. New York was managed by Bill Donovan. Home games were played at the Polo Grounds.

== Opening day game ==
Opening day was an away game at Griffith Stadium against the Washington Senators. The Yankee opening day starting pitcher was Jack Warhop.

The first game of the season on the home field was April 22, 1915, against the Washington Senators at the Polo Grounds with 7,000 attending. Mayor John Purroy Mitchel threw the ceremonial first pitch.

== Regular season ==
- June 23, 1915: Philadelphia Athletics pitcher Bruno Haas set an American League record by walking 16 Yankees in one game.

=== Season standings ===
American League
Team	W	L	Pct.	GB	Home	Road
Boston Red Sox	101	50	.669	—	55‍–‍20	46‍–‍30
Detroit Tigers	100	54	.649	2½	51‍–‍26	49‍–‍28
Chicago White Sox	93	61	.604	9½	54‍–‍24	39‍–‍37
Washington Senators	85	68	.556	17	50‍–‍29	35‍–‍39
New York Yankees	69	83	.454	32½	37‍–‍43	32‍–‍40
St. Louis Browns	63	91	.409	39½	35‍–‍38	28‍–‍53
Cleveland Indians	57	95	.375	44½	27‍–‍50	30‍–‍45
Philadelphia Athletics	43	109	.283	58½	19‍–‍53	24‍–‍56

=== Record vs. opponents ===
1915 American League record Sources:
Team	BOS	CWS	CLE	DET	NYY	PHA	SLB	WSH
Boston	—	12–10	16–4	14–8	10–12	17–5–1	17–5–2	15–6–1
Chicago	10–12	—	16–6	7–15	15–7	19–3	18–4	8–14–1
Cleveland	4–16	6–16	—	5–17	9–13–1	15–7–1	12–10	6–16
Detroit	8–14	15–7	17–5	—	17–5	17–5	13–9–2	13–9
New York	12–10	7–15	13–9–1	5–17	—	11–9	12–10–1	9–13
Philadelphia	5–17–1	3–19	7–15–1	5–17	9–11	—	6–16	8–14
St. Louis	5–17–2	4–18	10–12	9–13–2	10–12–1	16–6	—	9–13
Washington	6–15–1	14–8–1	16–6	9–13	13–9	14–8	13–9	—

=== Roster ===
1915 New York Yankees
Roster
Pitchers: Neal Brady; Boardwalk Brown; Ray Caldwell; King Cole; Ensign Cottrell; Bill Donovan; Ray Fisher; Ray Keating; Cliff Markle; Marty McHale; George Mogridge; Cy Pieh; Allen Russell; Bob Shawkey; Dan Tipple; Dazzy Vance; Jack Warhop	Catchers: Walt Alexander; Ernie Krueger; Les Nunamaker; Pius Schwert; Ed Sweeney; Roxy Walters; Infielders: Paddy Baumann; Lute Boone; Fritz Maisel; Charlie Mullen; Roger Peckinpaugh; Wally Pipp	Outfielders: Ed Barney; Doc Cook; Birdie Cree; Tom Daley; Frank Gilhooley; Roy Hartzell; Tim Hendryx; Hugh High; Gene Layden; Elmer Miller; Skeeter Shelton	Manager: Bill Donovan; Coaches: Duke Farrell

== Player stats ==
=== Batting ===
==== Starters by position ====
Note: Pos = Position; G = Games played; AB = At bats; H = Hits; Avg. = Batting average; HR = Home runs; RBI = Runs batted in

Pos	Player	G	AB	H	Avg.	HR	RBI
C	Les Nunamaker	87	249	56	.225	0	17
1B	Wally Pipp	136	479	118	.246	4	60
2B	Lute Boone	130	431	88	.204	5	43
SS	Roger Peckinpaugh	142	540	119	.220	5	44
3B	Fritz Maisel	135	530	149	.281	4	46
OF	Roy Hartzell	119	387	97	.251	3	60
OF	Doc Cook	132	476	129	.271	2	33
OF	Hugh High	119	427	110	.258	1	43

==== Other batters ====
Note: G = Games played; AB = At bats; H = Hits; Avg. = Batting average; HR = Home runs; RBI = Runs batted in

Player	G	AB	H	Avg.	HR	RBI
Paddy Baumann	76	219	64	.292	2	28
Birdie Cree	74	196	42	.214	0	15
Ed Sweeney	53	137	26	.190	0	5
Charlie Mullen	40	90	24	.267	0	7
Elmer Miller	26	83	12	.145	0	3
Walt Alexander	25	68	17	.250	1	5
Tim Hendryx	13	40	8	.200	0	1
Skeeter Shelton	10	40	1	.025	0	0
Ed Barney	11	36	7	.194	0	8
Ernie Krueger	10	29	5	.172	0	0
Pi Schwert	9	18	5	.278	0	6
Tom Daley	10	8	2	.250	0	1
Gene Layden	3	7	2	.286	0	0
Frank Gilhooley	1	4	0	.000	0	0
Roxy Walters	2	3	1	.333	0	0

=== Pitching ===
==== Starting pitchers ====
Note: G = Games pitched; IP = Innings pitched; W = Wins; L = Losses; ERA = Earned run average; SO = Strikeouts

Player	G	IP	W	L	ERA	SO
Ray Caldwell	36	305.0	19	16	2.89	130
Ray Fisher	30	247.2	18	11	2.11	97
Jack Warhop	21	143.1	7	9	3.96	34
Ray Keating	11	79.1	3	6	3.63	37
Marty McHale	13	78.1	3	7	.4.25	25
George Mogridge	6	41.0	2	3	1.76	11

==== Other pitchers ====
Note: G = Games pitched; IP = Innings pitched; W = Wins; L = Losses; ERA = Earned run average; SO = Strikeouts

Player	G	IP	W	L	ERA	SO
Boardwalk Brown	19	96.2	3	6	4.10	34
Cy Pieh	21	94.0	4	5	2.87	46
Bob Shawkey	16	85.2	4	7	3.26	31
King Cole	10	51.0	2	3	3.18	19
Bill Donovan	9	33.2	0	3	4.81	17
Dazzy Vance	8	28.0	0	3	3.54	18
Allen Russell	5	27.0	1	2	2.67	21
Cliff Markle	3	23.0	2	0	0.39	12
Dan Tipple	3	19.0	1	1	0.95	14
Neal Brady	2	8.2	0	0	3.12	6

==== Relief pitchers ====
Note: G = Games pitched; W = Wins; L = Losses; SV = Saves; ERA = Earned run average; SO = Strikeouts

Player	G	W	L	SV	ERA	SO
Ensign Cottrell	7	0	1	0	3.38	7
