= King Cole (baseball) =

American baseball player (1886–1916)

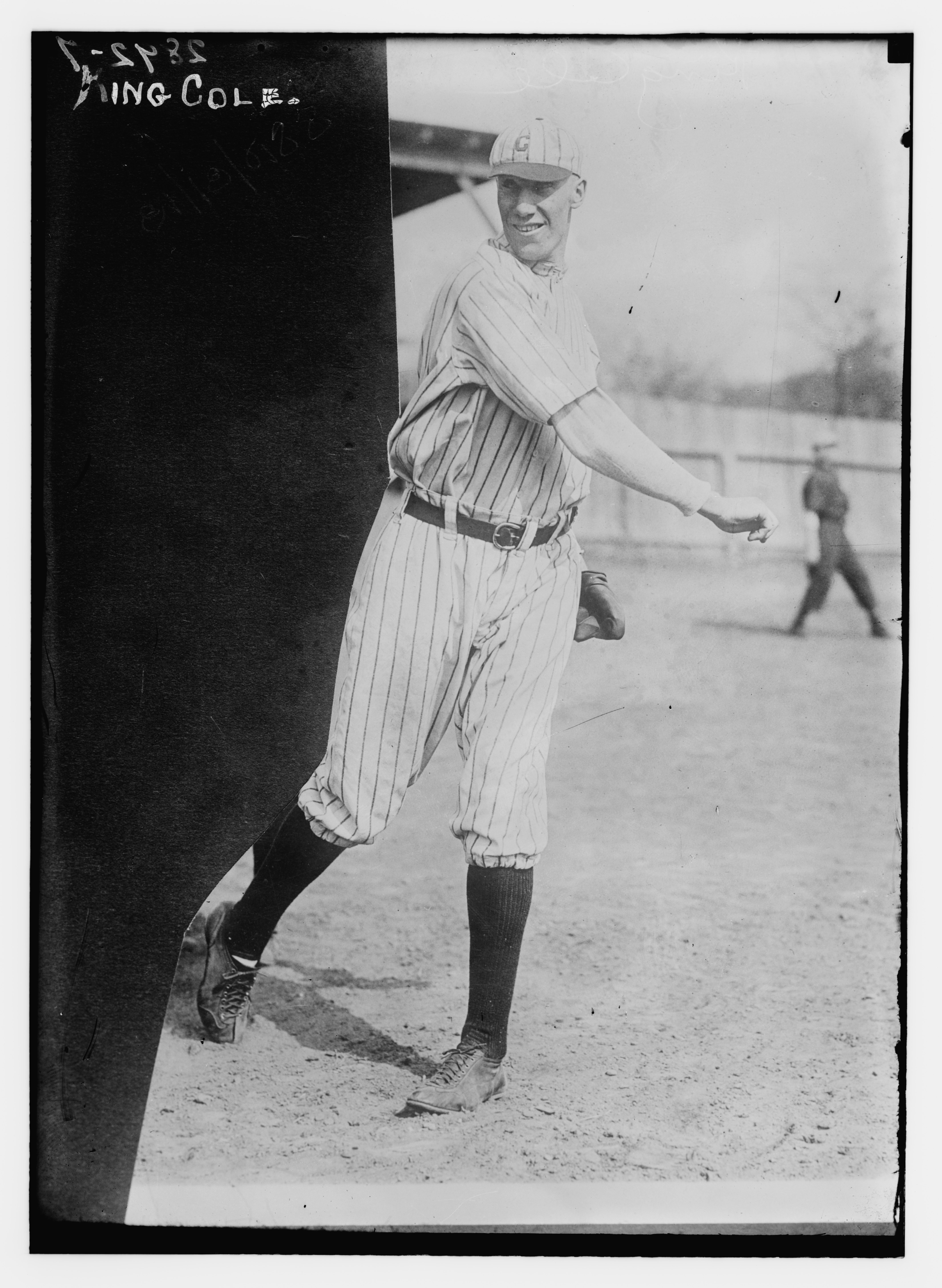
- Pitcher
- Born: April 15, 1886; Toledo, Iowa, U.S.
- Died: January 6, 1916 (aged 29); Bay City, Michigan, U.S.
- Batted: Right Threw: Right

MLB debut
- October 6, 1909, for the Chicago Cubs

Last MLB appearance
- September 20, 1915, for the New York Yankees

MLB statistics
- Win–loss record: 54–27
- Earned run average: 3.12
- Strikeouts: 298
- Stats at Baseball Reference

Teams
- Chicago Cubs (1909–1912); Pittsburgh Pirates (1912); New York Yankees (1914–1915)

Career highlights and awards
- NL ERA leader (1910)

Leonard Leslie "King" Cole (April 15, 1886 – January 6, 1916) was an American professional baseball player in the early 20th century. He started his baseball career as a pitcher with the Chicago Cubs of Major League Baseball (MLB) in 1909.

With the 1910 Cubs, Cole had a record of 20–4 and helped the team win the National League pennant. On July 31 of that season, he pitched all seven innings in a 4–0 Cubs win over the St. Louis Cardinals, without giving up a hit. It was the second game of a doubleheader: the teams had agreed to end the game at 5 p.m. so they could catch their trains. Due to a 1991 change to the official MLB definition of a no-hitter—it must last at least nine innings—Cole's effort is not recognized as a no-hitter by MLB.

Cole's 20–4 record in 1910 was the third-best single-season winning percentage (.833) for a Cubs pitcher in the 20th century.

Cole's career went into a slump around 1912, and he developed a reputation for inventing excuses for his poor performance. Ring Lardner (who reputedly gave him his nickname "King") allegedly used the personality trait of Cole's as inspiration for the 1915 short story Alibi Ike, about a baseball player who "never pulled a play, good or bad, on or off the field, without apologizin' for it."

Cole was traded to the Pittsburgh Pirates in May 1912, did not play in the major leagues in 1913, then played for the New York Yankees in 1914 and 1915. On October 2, 1914, Cole gave up a double to Babe Ruth, then a pitcher for the Boston Red Sox, for Ruth's first hit in the major leagues.

== 1915 season and death ==
During Spring Training in Savannah, Georgia in March 1915, manager Bill Donovan noticed that Cole was struggling through his motion on his pivot leg. Cole, denying there was anything going on, was called to the clubhouse and ordered to strip by Donovan. A few inches above his knee was a growth that had been there since Cole had left the Chicago Cubs. He added that the tumor did not hurt and that the day Donovan spotted it was the first time he felt any pain. Donovan felt that it was important that Cole have the growth removed and have him ready for summer rather than lose him after a few weeks of regular season games. On April 2, Donovan announced that Cole would go to the hospital to have the growth removed on his left leg when they returned to New York. Donovan added that the tumorous growth was ignored because there was no pain in Cole's body. Cole had surgery on April 14 at St. Vincent's Hospital in Greenwich Village, Manhattan to remove a tumor in his groin. While doctors at St. Vincent's were confident he would be ready to pitch soon, the brass of the Yankees felt that Cole would be unable to pitch until late summer of the 1915 season. Once Cole was released he would be allowed to go to him with his full pay until he was ready to return. Cole was allowed to put a uniform on for the first time on May 2 with doctors admitting that had Cole not gotten the surgery, he would have been out of baseball and suffer from pain from it the rest of his life. He stated that Donovan was right and offered that he could be ready to pitch within three weeks time. The doctors at St. Vincent released Cole on May 17 and stated that they requested that he go home to Bay City, Michigan. There were rumors that Cole would have to retire from baseball after the surgery.

While in Cleveland, Ohio to face the Cleveland Naps on July 9, rumors broke that Cole would rejoin the Yankees within 2 weeks. Cole's return came in the second game of a doubleheader against the Detroit Tigers on July 13, 1915. Cole was wild in his appearance, with Donovan pulling him out of the game during the second inning. Bob Shawkey replaced Cole and helped the Yankees win the game. Cole pitched the next game against the Tigers after Ray Caldwell got hit for nine runs in six innings, but was wild himself. Cole pitched for the Yankees through July and August, with his last game in August marred by another poor appearance against the Tigers on August 29. This time, Shawkey got beaten around by the opponents and Cole had to bail him out. Cole continued to be wild, hitting the first batter he faced and had an error when he overthrew Wally Pipp on a play to first base. After the game, the Yankees played an exhibition game in Harrisburg, Pennsylvania and told he was to not put on a uniform for the event. After the game, Cole missed the train back to New York City, resulting in Donovan suspending him indefinitely. Cole returned in mid-September, helping the Yankees end an eight game losing streak on September 16, facing the Chicago White Sox.

On September 26, Cole was on a drive with Birdie Cree and their wives through Yonkers around 6:30 p.m. on South Broadway when he hit 44-year old John Mitro with his car. Cole stopped the car after hitting Mitro and carried him to a nearby livery stable on South Broadway. Doctors at St. Joseph's Hospital were alerted to the accident and an ambulance brough Mitro to the hospital where he declined surgery on a fractured skull. Cole was arrested by Yonkers Police Department officers for $1,000 (1915 USD) bail on reckless driving charges. In return for bail, he offered the automobile that struck Mitro as collateral. Cole had his arraignment on the morning of September 27 and was paroled. Cole told the judge that he was done with playing baseball for the 1915 season and was planning a return to Bay City that week for a secondary operation. However, the judge requested that Cole not leave the state of New York until there was a better idea of the injuries to Mitro. Police officers added that Cole was not to blame for the accident. They stated that Cole had been driving slow along South Broadway and that Mitro had stepped off the curb from Nepperhan Terrace directly in front of the car. In a confusing situation, Cole stopped the car to allow Mitro to cross. Mitro backed up to let Cole through, but when Cole started, Mitro went forward into the path of the car, being struck.

A month later, Yankees owners Jacob Ruppert and Tillinghast L'Hommedieu Huston held a press conference with the media in which they absolved blame from Donovan for the performance during the 1915 season. They added that they would begin signing new players for the 1916 season and cut several players that they felt no longer had value to the franchise, including Boardwalk Brown, Ray Keating, Marty McHale, Ensign Cottrell, Tom Daley along with Cree and Cole.

By December 1915, the cancer had returned for Cole and his health was declining. By December 29, the press learned that Cole was dying due to the tumors in his body. Cole died at his home in Bay City, Michigan on January 6, 1916 from lung cancer at the age of 30. Cole's funeral was held at the home of his grandmother in Toledo, Iowa.

== See also ==
- List of baseball players who died during their careers
- List of Major League Baseball annual ERA leaders
