= Wild Bill Donovan =

Wild Bill Donovan may refer to:

- Bill Donovan (1876–1923), Major League Baseball pitcher
- William J. Donovan (1883–1959), general and head of the Office of Strategic Services (OSS)
