= List of New York Yankees Opening Day starting pitchers =

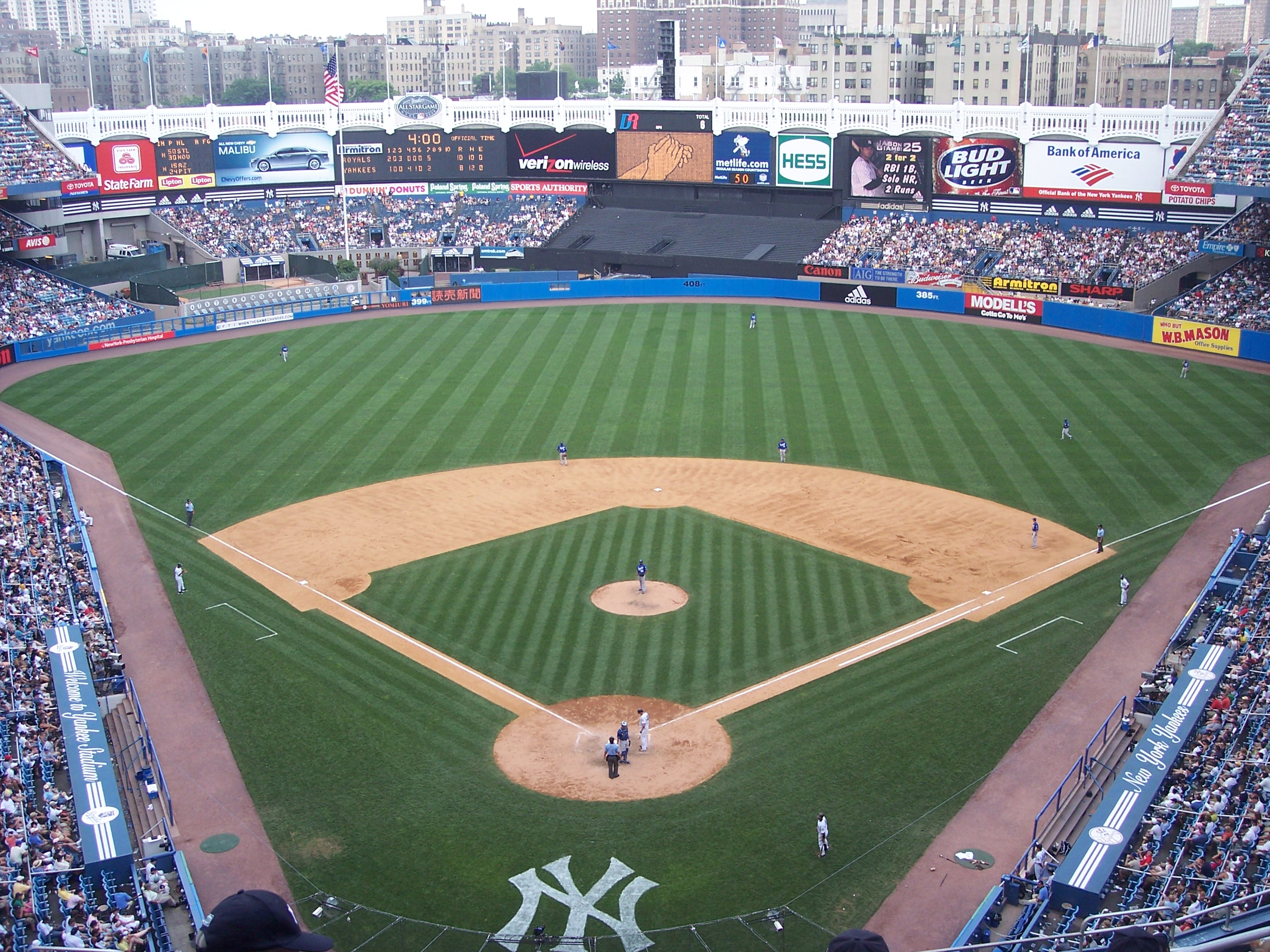
Yankee Stadium, New York's home field from 1923 to 1973, and 1976 to 2008.

The New York Yankees are a Major League Baseball (MLB) franchise based in The Bronx, New York City, New York. They play in the American League East division. The first game of the new baseball season for a team is played on Opening Day, and being named the Opening Day starter is an honor, which is often given to the player who is expected to lead the pitching staff that season, though there are various strategic reasons why a team's best pitcher might not start on Opening Day. The Yankees have used 58 different Opening Day starting pitchers in their 110 seasons. Since the franchise's beginning in 1901, the 58 starters have a combined Opening Day record of 58 wins, 36 losses, 1 tie (57–36–1), and 18 no decisions. No decisions are only awarded to the starting pitcher if the game is won or lost after the starting pitcher has left the game. Although in modern baseball, ties are rare due to extra innings, in 1910, New York's Opening Game against the Boston Red Sox was declared a tie due to darkness – at the time, Hilltop Park had lacked adequate lighting.

Whitey Ford, Ron Guidry, and Mel Stottlemyre hold the Yankees record for most Opening Day starts with seven. The other pitchers with three or more Opening Day starts for New York are CC Sabathia (6), Lefty Gomez (6), Red Ruffing (5), Jack Chesbro (4), Roger Clemens (4), Bob Shawkey (4), Masahiro Tanaka (4), Ray Caldwell (3), Jimmy Key (3), Vic Raschi (3), and most recently Gerrit Cole (3). Jimmy Key holds the Yankee record for best Opening Day record with a perfect 3–0.

On Opening Day, Yankee pitchers have a combined record of 35–12–1 when playing at home. Of those games, pitchers have a 1–0 record at Oriole Park, a 3–1–1 record at Hilltop Park, a 2–3 record from Polo Grounds, a 28–8 record at Yankee Stadium, and a 1–0 record at Shea Stadium. When on the road for Opening Day, Yankee pitchers have a combined record of 28–27.

During the 1901 and 1902 seasons, the franchise played in Baltimore as the "Baltimore Orioles". The franchise has Opening Day record of 1–1 as Baltimore. After their move to New York in 1903, the franchise was known as the New York Highlanders until 1912. As the Highlanders, they had a 6–3–1 Opening Day record. For seasons in which New York would later win the World Series, the starting pitchers have a 16–8 record.

== Key ==
Season	Each year is linked to an article about that particular Yankees season.
W	Win
L	Loss
ND (W)	No decision by starting pitcher; Yankees won game
ND (L)	No decision by starting pitcher; Yankees lost game
T	Tie
Pitcher (#)	Number of appearances as Opening Day starter with the Yankees
*	Advanced to the post-season
**	American League champions
†	World Series champions

== Pitchers ==
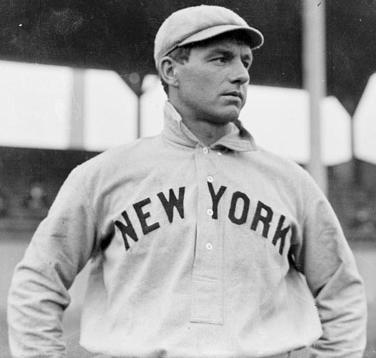
Joe McGinnity pitched on Opening Day for the Baltimore Orioles in 1901.

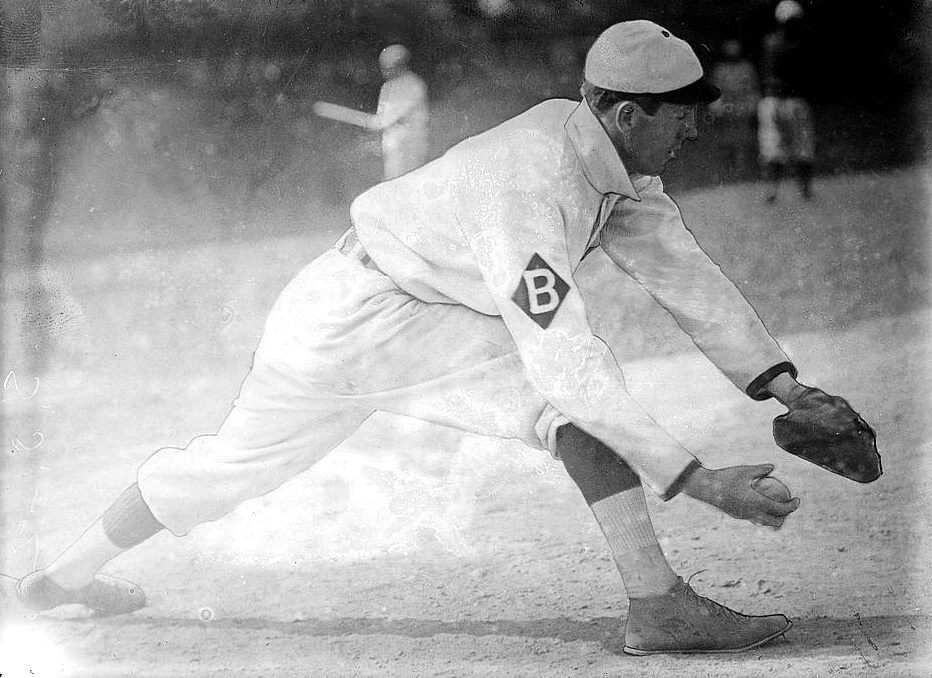
George McConnell was New York's Opening Day starting pitcher in 1913.

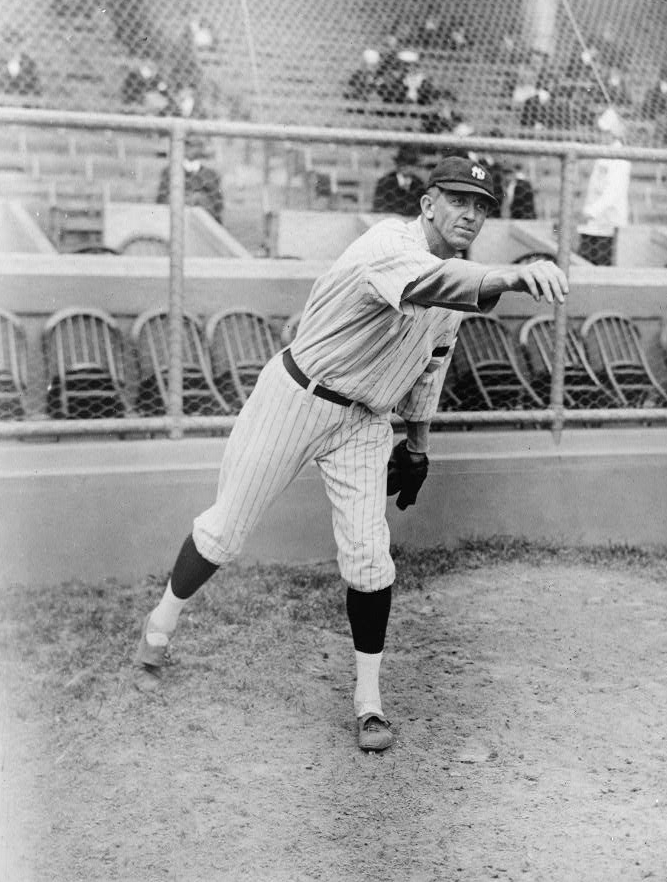
Ray Caldwell started on Opening Day in 1912, 1916 and 1917.

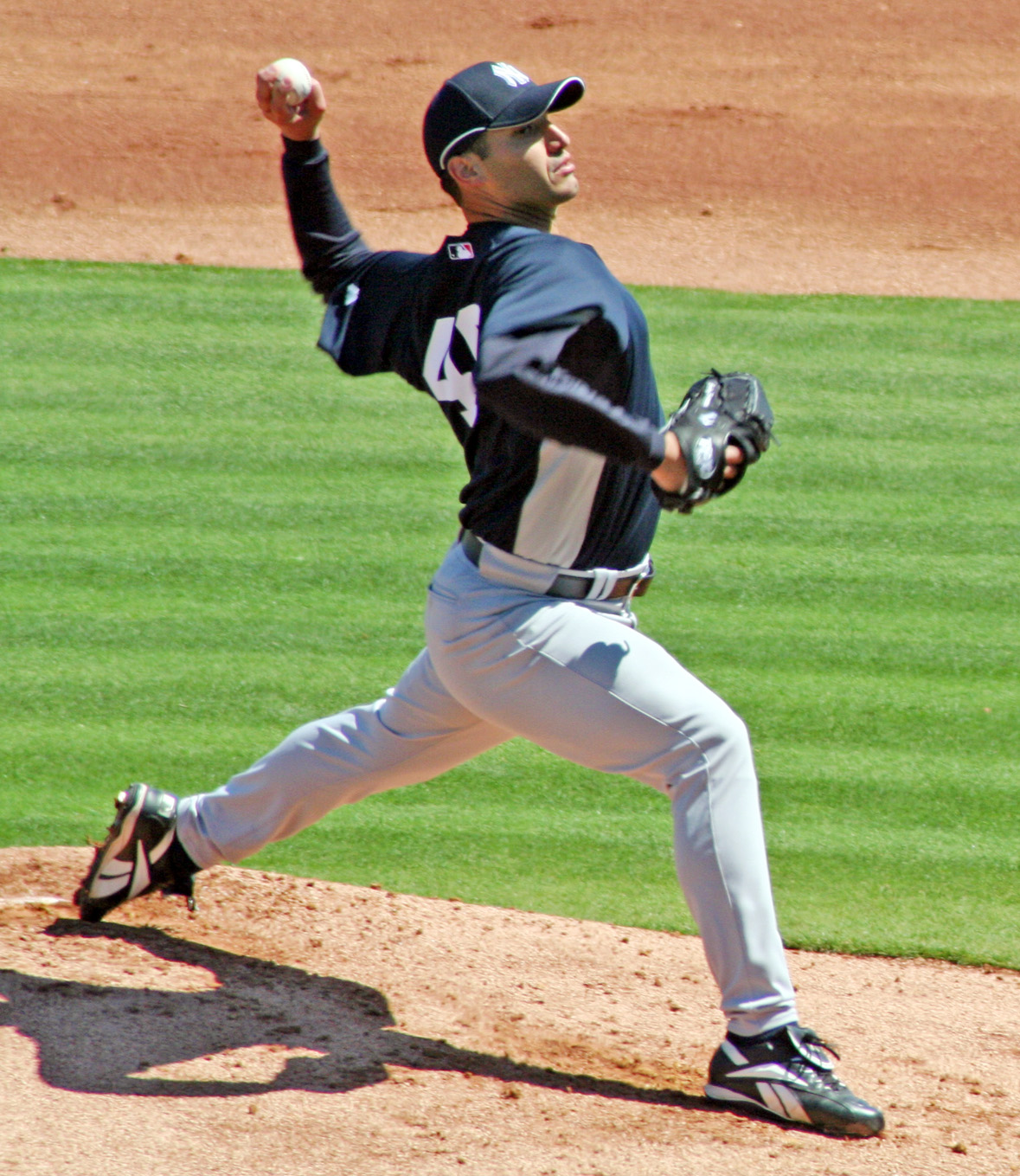
Andy Pettitte started on Opening Day for the New York Yankees in 1998.

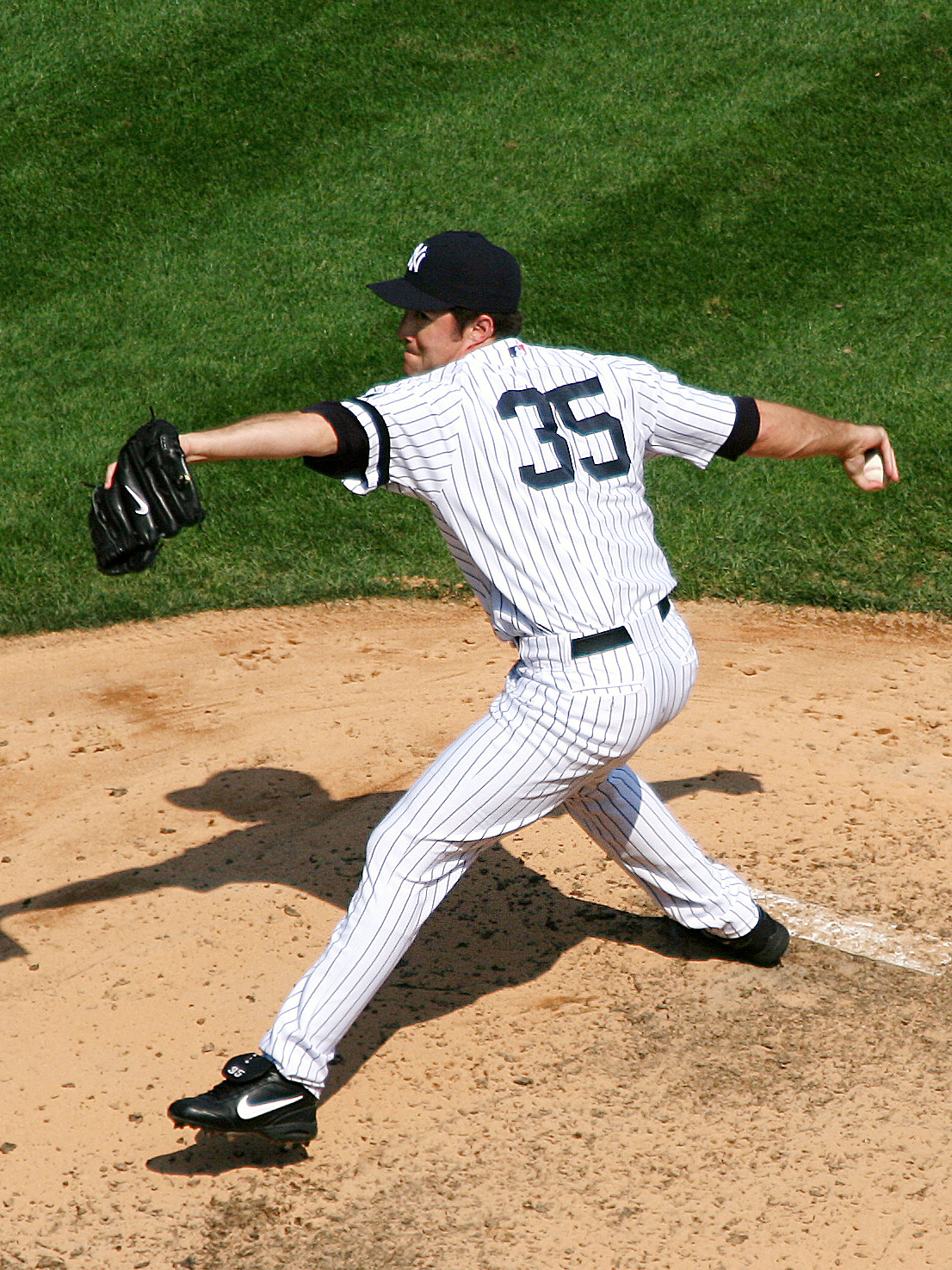
Opening Day 2004 marked Mike Mussina's first and only Opening Day start for the Yankees.

Season	Pitcher	Decision	Opponent	Location	Ref(s)
1901	Joe McGinnity	W	Boston Americans	Oriole Park	
1902	Tom Hughes	L	Boston Americans	Huntington Avenue Grounds	
1903	Jack Chesbro	L	Washington Senators	American League Park	
1904	Jack Chesbro (2)	W	Boston Americans	Hilltop Park	
1905	Jack Chesbro (3)	W	Washington Senators	American League Park	
1906	Jack Chesbro (4)	W	Boston Americans	Hilltop Park	
1907	Al Orth	W	Washington Senators	American League Park	
1908	Slow Joe Doyle	W	Philadelphia Athletics	Hilltop Park	
1909	Doc Newton	L	Washington Senators	American League Park	
1910	Hippo Vaughn	T	Boston Red Sox	Hilltop Park	
1911	Hippo Vaughn (2)	W	Philadelphia Athletics	Shibe Park	
1912	Ray Caldwell	L	Boston Red Sox	Hilltop Park	
1913	George McConnell	L	Washington Senators	Griffith Stadium	
1914	Marty McHale	W	Philadelphia Athletics	Polo Grounds	
1915	Jack Warhop	L	Washington Senators	Griffith Stadium	
1916	Ray Caldwell (2)	L	Washington Senators	Polo Grounds	
1917	Ray Caldwell (3)	L	Boston Red Sox	Polo Grounds	
1918	George Mogridge	W	Washington Senators	Griffith Stadium	
1919	George Mogridge (2)	L	Boston Red Sox	Polo Grounds	
1920	Bob Shawkey	L	Philadelphia Athletics	Shibe Park	
1921**	Carl Mays	W	Philadelphia Athletics	Polo Grounds	
1922**	Sad Sam Jones	L	Philadelphia Athletics	Griffith Stadium	
1923^{†}	Bob Shawkey (2)	W	Boston Red Sox	Yankee Stadium	
1924	Bob Shawkey (3)	W	Boston Red Sox	Fenway Park	
1925	Urban Shocker	W	Washington Senators	Yankee Stadium	
1926**	Bob Shawkey (4)	W	Boston Red Sox	Griffith Stadium	
1927^{†}	Waite Hoyt	W	Philadelphia Athletics	Yankee Stadium	
1928^{†}	Herb Pennock	W	Philadelphia Athletics	Shibe Park	
1929	George Pipgras	W	Boston Red Sox	Yankee Stadium	
1930	George Pipgras (2)	L	Philadelphia Athletics	Shibe Park	
1931	Red Ruffing	W	Boston Red Sox	Yankee Stadium	
1932^{†}	Lefty Gomez	W	Philadelphia Athletics	Shibe Park	
1933	Lefty Gomez (2)	W	Boston Red Sox	Yankee Stadium	
1934	Lefty Gomez (3)	ND (L)	Philadelphia Athletics	Shibe Park	
1935	Lefty Gomez (4)	L	Boston Red Sox	Yankee Stadium	
1936^{†}	Lefty Gomez (5)	L	Washington Senators	Griffith Stadium	
1937^{†}	Lefty Gomez (6)	L	Washington Senators	Yankee Stadium	
1938^{†}	Red Ruffing (2)	L	Washington Senators	Yankee Stadium	
1939^{†}	Red Ruffing (3)	W	Boston Red Sox	Yankee Stadium	
1940	Red Ruffing (4)	L	Philadelphia Athletics	Shibe Park	
1941^{†}	Marius Russo	W	Washington Senators	Griffith Stadium	
1942**	Red Ruffing (5)	W	Washington Senators	Griffith Stadium	
1943^{†}	Tiny Bonham	ND (W)	Washington Senators	Yankee Stadium	
1944	Hank Borowy	W	Boston Red Sox	Fenway Park	
1945	Atley Donald	W	Boston Red Sox	Yankee Stadium	
1946	Spud Chandler	W	Philadelphia Athletics	Shibe Park	
1947^{†}	Spud Chandler (2)	L	Philadelphia Athletics	Yankee Stadium	
1948	Allie Reynolds	W	Philadelphia Athletics	Griffith Stadium	
1949^{†}	Ed Lopat	W	Washington Senators	Yankee Stadium	
1950^{†}	Allie Reynolds (2)	ND (W)	Boston Red Sox	Fenway Park	
1951^{†}	Vic Raschi	W	Boston Red Sox	Yankee Stadium	
1952^{†}	Vic Raschi (2)	W	Philadelphia Athletics	Shibe Park	
1953^{†}	Vic Raschi (3)	L	Philadelphia Athletics	Yankee Stadium	
1954	Whitey Ford	ND (L)	Washington Senators	Griffith Stadium	
1955	Whitey Ford (2)	W	Washington Senators	Yankee Stadium	
1956^{†}	Don Larsen	W	Washington Senators	Griffith Stadium	
1957**	Whitey Ford (3)	W	Washington Senators	Yankee Stadium	
1958^{†}	Don Larsen (2)	W	Boston Red Sox	Fenway Park	
1959	Bob Turley	W	Boston Red Sox	Yankee Stadium	
1960	Jim Coates	W	Boston Red Sox	Fenway Park	
1961^{†}	Whitey Ford (4)	L	Minnesota Twins	Yankee Stadium	
1962^{†}	Whitey Ford (5)	ND (W)	Baltimore Orioles	Yankee Stadium	
1963**	Ralph Terry	W	Kansas City Athletics	Municipal Stadium	
1964**	Whitey Ford (6)	L	Boston Red Sox	Fenway Park	
1965	Jim Bouton	ND (L)	Minnesota Twins	Metropolitan Stadium	
1966	Whitey Ford (7)	L	Detroit Tigers	Yankee Stadium	
1967	Mel Stottlemyre	W	Washington Senators	Robert F. Kennedy Memorial Stadium	
1968	Mel Stottlemyre (2)	W	California Angels	Yankee Stadium	
1969	Mel Stottlemyre (3)	W	Washington Senators	Robert F. Kennedy Memorial Stadium	
1970	Mel Stottlemyre (4)	L	Boston Red Sox	Yankee Stadium	
1971	Stan Bahnsen	L	Boston Red Sox	Fenway Park	
1972	Mel Stottlemyre (5)	L	Baltimore Orioles	Memorial Stadium	
1973	Mel Stottlemyre (6)	L	Boston Red Sox	Fenway Park	
1974	Mel Stottlemyre (7)	W	Cleveland Indians	Shea Stadium	
1975	Doc Medich	L	Cleveland Indians	Cleveland Stadium	
1976**	Catfish Hunter	L	Milwaukee Brewers	Milwaukee County Stadium	
1977^{†}	Catfish Hunter (2)	W	Milwaukee Brewers	Yankee Stadium	
1978^{†}	Ron Guidry	ND (L)	Texas Rangers	Arlington Stadium	
1979	Ron Guidry (2)	L	Milwaukee Brewers	Yankee Stadium	
1980*	Ron Guidry (3)	ND (L)	Texas Rangers	Arlington Stadium	
1981**	Tommy John	W	Texas Rangers	Yankee Stadium	
1982	Ron Guidry (4)	ND (L)	Chicago White Sox	Yankee Stadium	
1983	Ron Guidry (5)	ND (L)	Seattle Mariners	Kingdome	
1984	Ron Guidry (6)	L	Kansas City Royals	Royals Stadium	
1985	Phil Niekro	L	Boston Red Sox	Fenway Park	
1986	Ron Guidry (7)	W	Kansas City Royals	Yankee Stadium	
1987	Dennis Rasmussen	ND (W)	Detroit Tigers	Tiger Stadium	
1988	Rick Rhoden	W	Minnesota Twins	Yankee Stadium	
1989	Tommy John	W	Minnesota Twins	Hubert H. Humphrey Metrodome	
1990	Dave LaPoint	ND (W)	Cleveland Indians	Yankee Stadium	
1991	Tim Leary	ND (L)	Detroit Tigers	Tiger Stadium	
1992	Scott Sanderson	W	Boston Red Sox	Yankee Stadium	
1993	Jimmy Key	W	Cleveland Indians	Cleveland Stadium	
1994	Jimmy Key (2)	W	Texas Rangers	Yankee Stadium	
1995*	Jimmy Key (3)	W	Texas Rangers	Yankee Stadium	
1996^{†}	David Cone	W	Cleveland Indians	Jacobs Field	
1997*	David Cone (2)	L	Seattle Mariners	Kingdome	
1998^{†}	Andy Pettitte	L	Anaheim Angels	Edison International Field of Anaheim	
1999^{†}	Roger Clemens	ND (L)	Oakland Athletics	Network Associates Coliseum	
2000^{†}	Orlando Hernandez	W	Anaheim Angels	Edison International Field of Anaheim	
2001**	Roger Clemens (2)	W	Kansas City Royals	Yankee Stadium	
2002*	Roger Clemens (3)	L	Baltimore Orioles	Oriole Park at Camden Yards	
2003**	Roger Clemens (4)	W	Toronto Blue Jays	SkyDome	
2004*	Mike Mussina	L	Tampa Bay Devil Rays	Tokyo Dome	
2005*	Randy Johnson	W	Boston Red Sox	Yankee Stadium	
2006*	Randy Johnson (2)	W	Oakland Athletics	McAfee Coliseum	
2007*	Carl Pavano	ND (W)	Tampa Bay Devil Rays	Yankee Stadium	
2008	Chien-Ming Wang	W	Toronto Blue Jays	Yankee Stadium	
2009^{†}	CC Sabathia	L	Baltimore Orioles	Oriole Park at Camden Yards	
2010*	CC Sabathia (2)	ND (L)	Boston Red Sox	Fenway Park	
2011*	CC Sabathia (3)	ND (W)	Detroit Tigers	Yankee Stadium	
2012*	CC Sabathia (4)	ND (L)	Tampa Bay Rays	Tropicana Field	
2013	CC Sabathia (5)	L	Boston Red Sox	Yankee Stadium	
2014	CC Sabathia (6)	L	Houston Astros	Minute Maid Park	
2015*	Masahiro Tanaka	L	Toronto Blue Jays	Yankee Stadium	
2016	Masahiro Tanaka (2)	ND (L)	Houston Astros	Yankee Stadium	
2017*	Masahiro Tanaka (3)	L	Tampa Bay Rays	Tropicana Field	
2018*	Luis Severino	W	Toronto Blue Jays	Rogers Centre	
2019*	Masahiro Tanaka (4)	W	Baltimore Orioles	Yankee Stadium	
2020*	Gerrit Cole	W	Washington Nationals	Nationals Park	
2021*	Gerrit Cole (2)	ND (L)	Toronto Blue Jays	Yankee Stadium	
2022*	Gerrit Cole (3)	ND (W)	Boston Red Sox	Yankee Stadium	
2023	Gerrit Cole (4)	W	San Francisco Giants	Yankee Stadium	
2024**	Nestor Cortés Jr.	ND (W)	Houston Astros	Minute Maid Park	
2025*	Carlos Rodón	W	Milwaukee Brewers	Yankee Stadium	
2026*	Max Fried	W	San Francisco Giants	Oracle Park	
