= Carl Pavano =

American baseball player (born 1976)

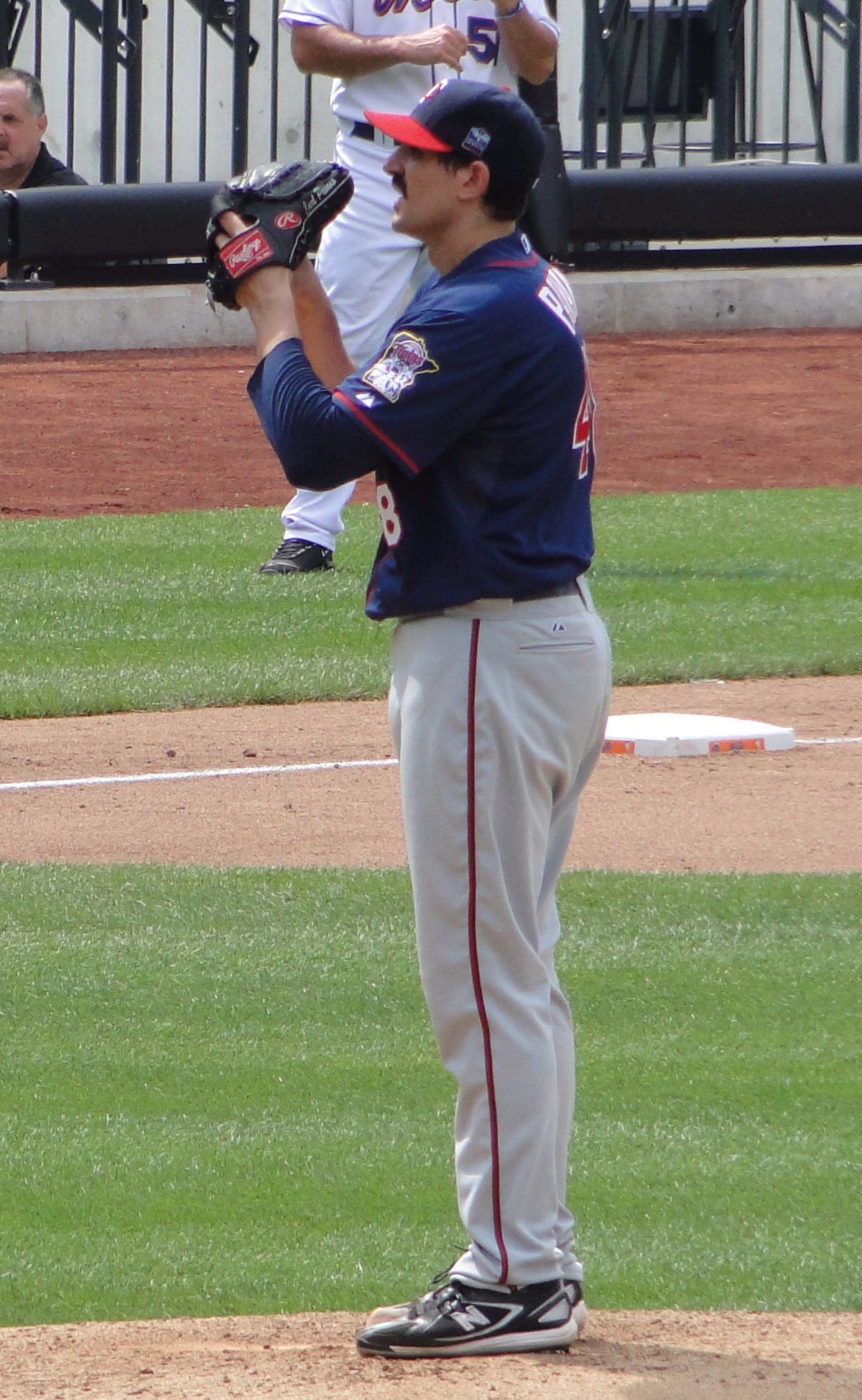
- Pavano with the Minnesota Twins in 2010
- Pitcher
- Born: January 8, 1976 (age 50); New Britain, Connecticut, U.S.
- Batted: Right Threw: Right

MLB debut
- May 23, 1998, for the Montreal Expos

Last MLB appearance
- June 1, 2012, for the Minnesota Twins

MLB statistics
- Win–loss record: 108–107
- Earned run average: 4.39
- Strikeouts: 1,091
- Stats at Baseball Reference

Teams
- Montreal Expos (1998–2002); Florida Marlins (2002–2004); New York Yankees (2005, 2007–2008); Cleveland Indians (2009); Minnesota Twins (2009–2012)

Career highlights and awards
- All-Star (2004); World Series champion (2003)

Carl Anthony Pavano (born January 8, 1976) is an American former professional baseball player. A right-handed pitcher, Pavano played in Major League Baseball (MLB) from 1998 to 2012 for the Montreal Expos, Florida Marlins, New York Yankees, Cleveland Indians, and Minnesota Twins. He was a member of the 2003 World Series champion Marlins and appeared in the 2004 All-Star Game. He signed with the Yankees in 2005, with whom he became known for frequent injuries during his four years with the team.

== Amateur career ==
Born in New Britain, Connecticut, Pavano graduated from Southington High School in Southington, Connecticut, the alma mater of former major league pitcher Rob Dibble. Pavano's retired jersey (number 14) still hangs (unretired as of 2011). At Southington, Pavano led the baseball team to a state championship in 1994. Pavano initially committed to play college baseball at Louisiana State.

== Professional career ==
=== Boston Red Sox ===
Pavano was selected by the Boston Red Sox in the 13th round (355th overall) of the 1994 amateur draft. In 1996, with the A level Michigan Battle Cats, he was 6–6 with a 3.44 ERA in 22 starts. This earned him a number of honors including Baseball America first team Minor League All-Star, Double-A All-Star, Eastern League All-Star & Pitcher of the Year and Red Sox minor league player of the year. In 1997, with the AA Trenton Thunder, he was 16–5 with a 2.63 ERA in 26 starts and was selected as a Triple-A All-Star.

=== Montreal Expos ===
In November 1997, the Red Sox sent Pavano to Montreal, along with pitcher Tony Armas Jr., in a trade that brought Pedro Martínez to Boston. Pavano made his Major League debut on May 23, 1998 by starting and pitching seven strong innings against the Philadelphia Phillies. He allowed one run and struck out six while allowing no walks. He recorded his first win on June 2, 1998 when he pitched 7.1 innings, also against the Phillies. Pavano is well known for giving up Mark McGwire's 70th home run in the 1998 season. He pitched four and one-half seasons for the Expos, making 78 starts and had a record of 24–35 and an ERA of 4.83.

=== Florida Marlins ===
The Expos traded Pavano to the Florida Marlins in the middle of the 2002 season (with Graeme Lloyd, Mike Mordecai and Justin Wayne) for Cliff Floyd, Wilton Guerrero, and Claudio Vargas.

Despite being plagued by injuries, Pavano became an important part of Florida's starting rotation and had a highly successful postseason in 2003 for the World Series champion Marlins. He started Game 4 of the Series against the Yankees, holding New York to one run over eight innings in a game the Marlins would go on to win, 4–3, in extra innings.

Pavano followed up his playoff exploits with his best season to date in 2004, posting an 18–8 record and a 3.00 ERA.

=== New York Yankees ===
Pavano became a free agent following the season and, despite receiving bigger offers from Boston, Detroit, and Cincinnati, chose to accept a four-year contract worth $39.95 million with the New York Yankees on December 20, 2004.

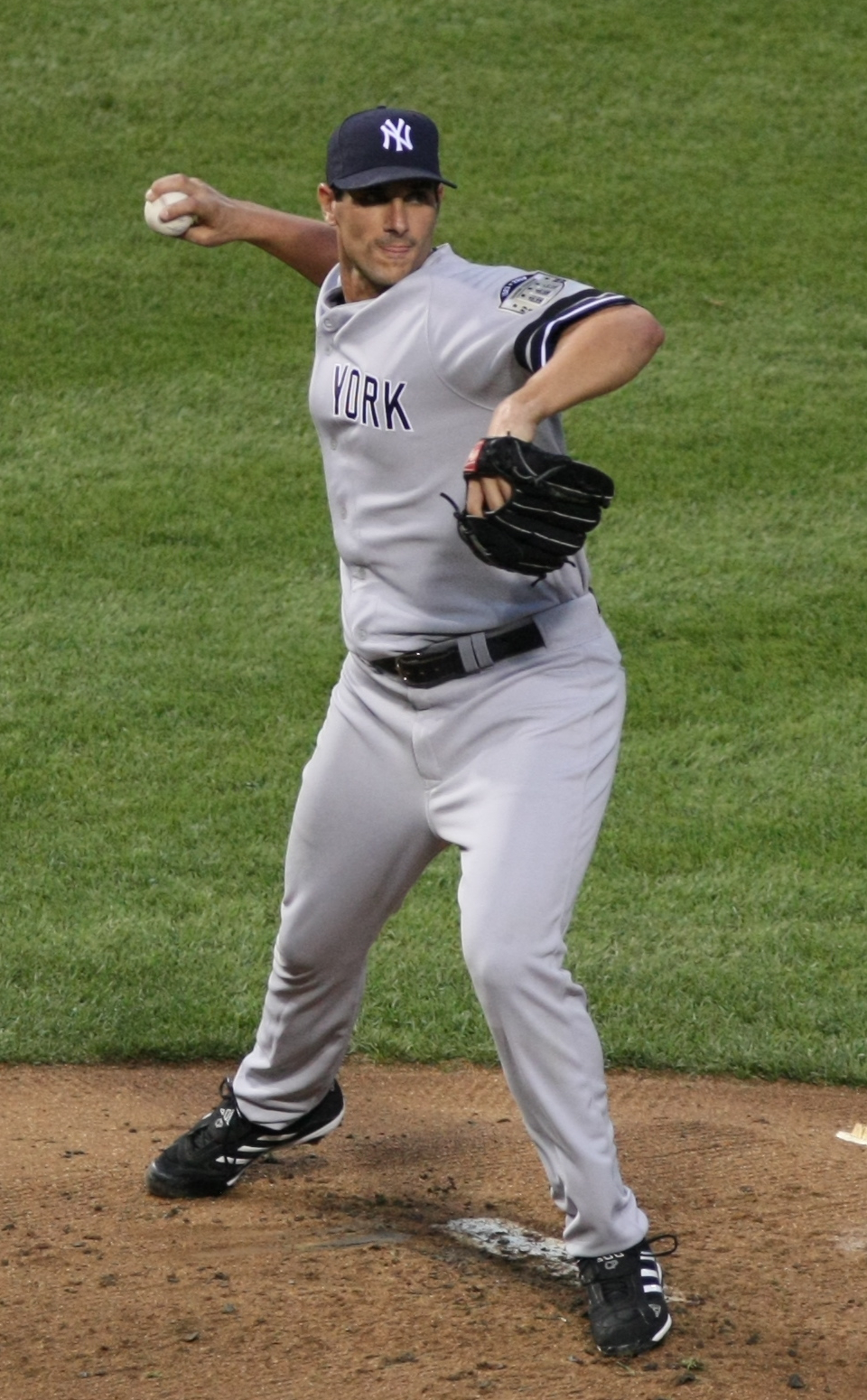
Pavano during his tenure with the New York Yankees in 2008.

Pavano began the 2005 season with quality starts in seven of his first 10 appearances, with a 4–2 record and a 3.69 ERA. However, in June of that year, he injured his right shoulder and went on the disabled list. Pavano made 17 starts and finished 4–6 with a 4.77 ERA. The Yankees expected him to be healthy for the 2006 season, but Pavano began the season on the disabled list after bruising his buttocks in a spring training game. He did not pitch at all in the majors in 2006, making only minor league rehab starts. On August 15, 2006, Pavano broke two ribs in an automobile accident after he hit another vehicle with his Porsche in West Palm Beach, Florida. His girlfriend at the time, Gia Allemand, was with him in the car. However, he did not tell the Yankees about the incident until August 28, the day they informed him that they planned for him to come off the disabled list to play that Thursday.

During spring training in 2007, teammate Mike Mussina said that Pavano needed to prove that he wanted to pitch for the team and that he did not believe he was the only Yankee who felt this way. "It didn't look good from a player's and teammate's standpoint," Mussina said of Pavano's injuries. "Was everything just coincidence? Over and over again? I don't know." Manager Joe Torre explained that the amount of work Pavano needed to do in repairing his clubhouse image was "sizable." After Chien-Ming Wang injured his right hamstring late in spring training, the Yankees chose Pavano to start on Opening Day against the Tampa Bay Devil Rays at Yankee Stadium. On April 15, Pavano was placed on the 15-day DL with what was described as an "elbow strain". On May 23, it was reported that Pavano would opt for Tommy John surgery on his elbow.

In December 2007, the Yankees asked Pavano to accept a minor-league contract to clear space on their 40-man roster. Pavano's agent, Tom O'Connell, stated that Pavano would consider the request, but he later turned it down. O'Connell also stated that Pavano's rehabilitation was going faster than expected and he might be available to pitch in the majors by mid-summer 2008.

On July 29, 2008, Pavano made his first rehab start since his Tommy John surgery for the Charleston RiverDogs, allowing one hit and one walk in two scoreless innings.

Pavano made his first start of the 2008 season during the Yankees’ series against the Baltimore Orioles on August 23, pitching five innings, giving up three earned runs on seven hits, one walk and five strikeouts in the 5–3 Yankees win. He made his second start of the season against the Toronto Blue Jays on August 29 and was victorious, pitching six strong innings in the Yankees' 2–1 win.

Since his first stint on the disabled list, Pavano did not endear himself to his Yankee teammates, and he stated that he would not visit the team when they played in Tampa Bay, near where he was rehabilitating. Meanwhile, O'Connell, Pavano's agent, said that Pavano would still be a desired commodity on the free-agent market that winter, even with his injury history. "Carl's a 1–2 starter. Those guys don't grow on trees. Those guys are very rare, 200-inning guys are very rare in this game, and they're the ones that make the money. And he did it two years in a row, before he got hurt, and I'm sure he's going to do it again," O'Connell said.

On September 14, Pavano allowed three earned runs and five hits before leaving the mound in the sixth inning following a visit by the trainer and manager Joe Girardi. Pavano was pitching to Eric Hinske with one out and a runner on first base when Girardi went to the mound. After a short discussion, Pavano walked off the field as the sellout crowd showered him with boos. It was reported as a left hip injury.

Due to his repeated injuries with the Yankees, the New York media began derisively referring to Pavano as "American Idle." During his time with the Yankees, he pitched a combined 26 MLB games over four seasons, compared to 31 with the Marlins in 2004.

=== Cleveland Indians ===
On January 6, 2009, Pavano signed a one-year, $1.5 million contract with the Cleveland Indians with possible incentives of up to $5.3 million.

=== Minnesota Twins ===
On August 7, 2009, Pavano was traded to the Minnesota Twins, for whom he lost the clinching third game against the Yankees in the American League Division Series (ALDS).

Following the season, Pavano filed for free agency but later accepted the Twins' offer through salary arbitration. He ended up having his best season since 2004. From May 29 to August 13, Pavano compiled a record of 11–2 with an ERA of 2.79, including twice throwing back-to-back complete games in which one was also a shutout. He went 17–11 with a 3.75 ERA in 221 innings and helped the Twins run away with the Central Division title. However, in the playoffs, Pavano lost Game 2 of the ALDS to the Yankees at Target Field 5–2, and the Twins were swept in three games. Pavano was named the Twins' Pitcher of the Year.

On January 19, 2011, Pavano agreed to a two-year, $16.5 million contract with the Twins. He was paid $8 million in 2011 and $8.5 million in 2012, along with up to $500,000 in incentives. Pavano was the Opening Day starter for the Twins on April 1, giving up seven earned runs over 4 innings in a 13–3 loss to the Toronto Blue Jays.

On May 1, after performing poorly against the Kansas City Royals, Pavano took a bat to a trashcan in the Twins dugout after being removed in the sixth inning of a 10–3 loss. Pavano responded by saying "That's as frustrated as I can get. It actually felt pretty good. I just kept whaling away with it. The (bat) wouldn't break. I couldn't break a bat in the dugout and I couldn't break any out there (on the mound). It was embarrassing." After his May 8 start, Pavano was 2–4 with a 6.64 ERA, the highest on the team. However, on May 13, Pavano threw 5 1/3 scoreless innings against the Blue Jays in the Twins 2–0 loss. His pitching continued to improve through late May and early June. Pavano recorded his 100th career win in a complete game, two-run performance on June 3 against Kansas City, and he pitched another complete game win 12 days later against the Chicago White Sox. Pavano continued the season with mixed success. He finished with a 9–13 record and a 4.30 ERA, closing out the Twins' season with a shutout of the Royals. Of the five starting pitchers for the Twins in 2011, Pavano was the only one who remained in the rotation for the entire season. Francisco Liriano, Brian Duensing, Nick Blackburn, and Scott Baker all missed starts due to injuries.

Pavano was again the opening day starter for the Twins in 2012. He took the loss after allowing four runs on five hits in seven innings pitched against the Baltimore Orioles. He started only 11 games for the Twins, going 2–5 with a 6.00 ERA.

He announced his retirement from baseball on February 26, 2014.

== Analyst ==
Pavano served as an analyst for Fox Sports Florida for Miami Marlins pre- and postgame shows starting with the 2014 season. He was dropped before the 2017 season.

== Pitching style ==
Pavano was a sinkerballer. He threw his sinker and less-used four-seam fastball in the mid-to-upper 80s. He also had a slider and changeup, the former primarily used against right-handed hitters and the latter primarily against lefties.

== See also ==
- List of New York Yankees Opening Day starting pitchers
