= Dan Tipple =

American baseball player (1890-1960)

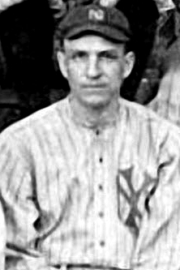
- Pitcher
- Born: February 13, 1890; Rockford, Illinois, U.S.
- Died: March 26, 1960 (aged 70); Omaha, Nebraska, U.S.
- Batted: Right Threw: Right

MLB debut
- September 18, 1915, for the New York Yankees

Last MLB appearance
- October 6, 1915, for the New York Yankees

MLB statistics
- Win–loss record: 1–1
- Earned run average: 0.95
- Strikeouts: 14
- Stats at Baseball Reference

Teams
- New York Yankees (1915)

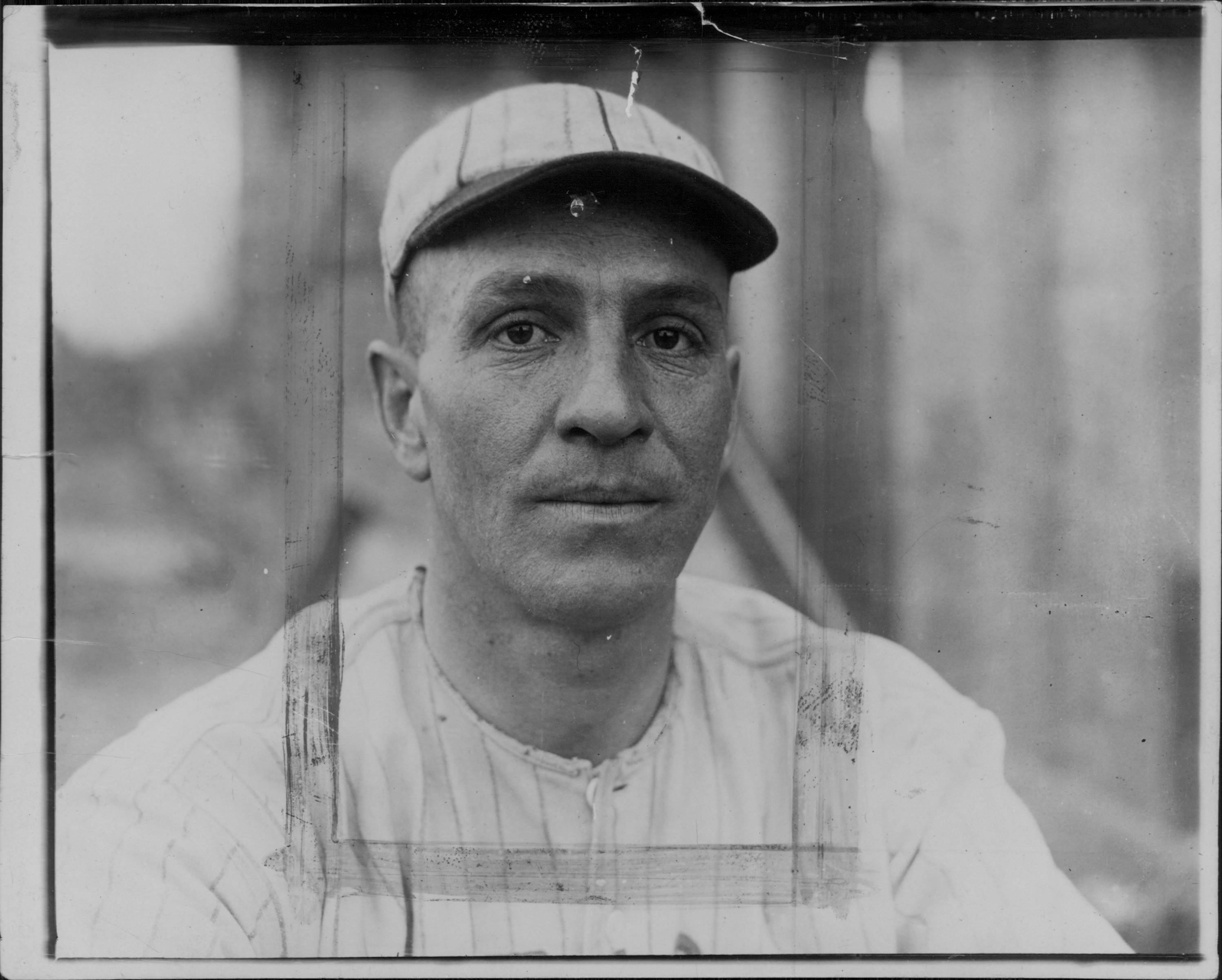
Tipple with the minor league Minneapolis Millers, 1920s

Daniel Slaughter ("Rusty" or "Big Dan") Tipple (February 13, 1890 – March 26, 1960), was an American Major League Baseball pitcher who played in 1915 with the New York Yankees. He batted and threw right-handed. Tipple had a 1–1 record, with a 0.95 ERA, in three games in his one-year career. He also played for various other teams in his minor league career (1912–1923, 1928).
