= Gene Layden =

American baseball player (1894-1984)

- Outfielder
- Born: March 14, 1894; Pittsburgh, Pennsylvania, U.S.
- Died: December 12, 1984 (aged 90); Pittsburgh, Pennsylvania, U.S.
- Batted: Right Threw: Right

MLB debut
- July 29, 1915, for the New York Yankees

Last MLB appearance
- September 25, 1915, for the New York Yankees

MLB statistics
- Batting average: .286
- Home runs: 0
- Runs batted in: 0
- Stats at Baseball Reference

Teams
- New York Yankees (1915)

Eugene Francis Layden (March 14, 1894 – December 12, 1984) was an American Major League Baseball outfielder. Layden played for the New York Yankees in 1915. In three career games, he had two hits in seven at-bats, with two RBIs. He batted and threw left-handed.

Layden was born in Pittsburgh, Pennsylvania. Layden died on December 12, 1984 at the Forbes Gerontology Center at the age of 90. He had been a supervisor of Moore Park in the Pittsburgh neighborhood of Brookline.
