= Neal Brady =

American baseball player (1897–1947)

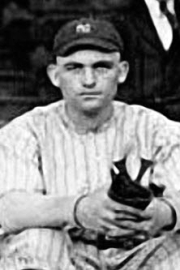
- Pitcher
- Born: March 4, 1897; Covington, Kentucky
- Died: June 19, 1947 (aged 50); Fort Mitchell, Kentucky
- Batted: Right Threw: Right

MLB debut
- September 25, 1915, for the New York Yankees

Last MLB appearance
- September 21, 1925, for the Cincinnati Reds

MLB statistics
- Win–loss record: 2–3
- Earned run average: 4.20
- Strikeouts: 22
- Stats at Baseball Reference

Teams
- New York Yankees (1915, 1917); Cincinnati Reds (1925)

Cornelius Joseph Brady (March 4, 1897 – June 18, 1947) was a Major League Baseball pitcher. Brady played for the New York Yankees in 1915 and 1917 and the Cincinnati Reds in 1925. In 24 career games, he had a 2–3 record, with a 4.20 ERA. He batted and threw right-handed.

Brady graduated from St. Xavier High School across the river in Cincinnati. Brady had been in poor health since 1941, but had been doing multiple jobs, including being the President of the Summit Hills Country Club and a personnel manager for Coca-Cola's Cincinnati location. He died of a heart attack on June 18, 1947 at his home on South Fort Mitchell, Kentucky. His funeral would be held at St. Mary's Cemetery in Fort Mitchell.
