= Ed Barney =

American baseball player (1890–1967)

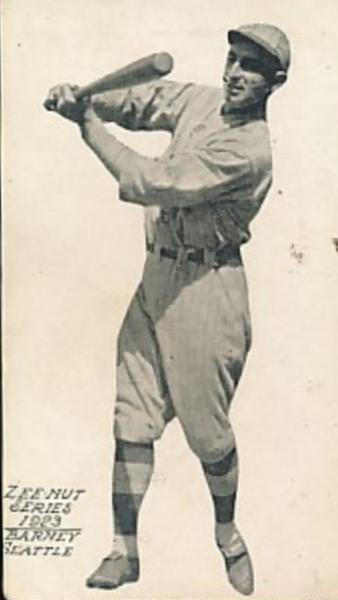
- Outfielder
- Born: January 23, 1890; Amery, Wisconsin, U.S.
- Died: October 4, 1967 (aged 77); Rice Lake, Wisconsin, U.S.
- Batted: Left Threw: Right

MLB debut
- July 22, 1915, for the New York Yankees

Last MLB appearance
- July 2, 1916, for the Pittsburgh Pirates

MLB statistics
- Batting average: .224
- Home runs: 0
- Runs batted in: 22
- Stats at Baseball Reference

Teams
- New York Yankees (1915); Pittsburgh Pirates (1915–1916)

Edmund J. (Ed) Barney (January 23, 1890 – October 4, 1967) was an American Major League Baseball outfielder. Barney played for the New York Yankees and the Pittsburgh Pirates in 1915 and 1916. In 88 career games, he had a .224 batting average with 61 hits in 272 at-bats. He batted left and threw right-handed.

Barney was born in Amery, Wisconsin and died in Rice Lake, Wisconsin.
