= Bill Donovan =

American baseball player and manager (1876–1923)

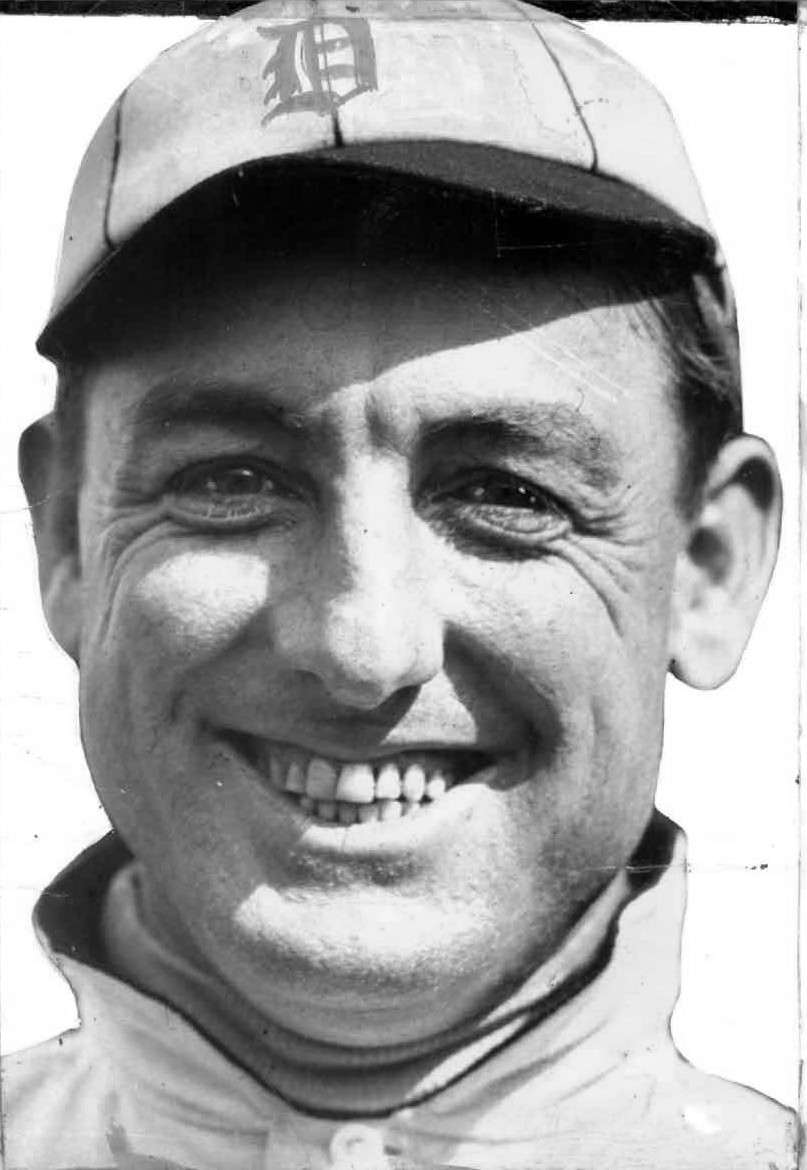
- Pitcher
- Born: October 13, 1876; Lawrence, Massachusetts, U.S.
- Died: December 9, 1923 (aged 47); Forsyth, New York, U.S.
- Batted: Right Threw: Right

MLB debut
- April 22, 1898, for the Washington Senators

Last MLB appearance
- September 2, 1918, for the Detroit Tigers

MLB statistics
- Win–loss record: 186–139
- Earned run average: 2.69
- Strikeouts: 1,552
- Stats at Baseball Reference

Teams
- As player: Washington Senators (1898); Brooklyn Superbas (1899–1902); Detroit Tigers (1903–1912); New York Yankees (1915–1916); Detroit Tigers (1918); As manager: New York Yankees (1915–1917); Philadelphia Phillies (1921)

Career highlights and awards
- NL wins leader (1901)

William Edward Donovan (October 13, 1876 – December 9, 1923), nicknamed "Wild Bill" and "Smiling Bill", was an American right-handed baseball pitcher and manager.

Donovan played Major League Baseball for the Washington Senators (1898), Brooklyn Superbas (1899–1902), and Detroit Tigers (1903–1912). In 1901, he led the National League with 25 wins. He later helped Detroit win three consecutive American League pennants from 1907 to 1909. In 1907, he compiled a 25–4 record with a 2.12 earned run average (ERA). In 18 major league seasons, Donovan appeared in 378 games as a pitcher and compiled a 186–139 win–loss record with 289 complete games and a 2.69 ERA in 2,964 2/3 innings pitched.

Donovan was also a better than average hitting pitcher, posting a .193 batting average (251-for-1,302) scoring 142 runs with 7 home runs, 94 runs batted in and drawing 77 bases on balls.

After retiring as a player, Donovan served as a manager and coach. He was the player-manager of the Providence Grays in 1913 and 1914, leading the club to the International League pennant in 1914 with help from rookie pitcher Babe Ruth. He next served as player-manager of the New York Yankees from 1915 to 1917. He served as a pitching coach for the Detroit Tigers in 1918 and managed the Jersey City Skeeters in 1919 and 1920. He managed the Philadelphia Phillies for the first half of the 1921 season and then concluded his career as manager of the Hartford Eastern League team in 1922 and 1923. He died in a train crash in December 1923 while traveling to baseball's winter meetings.

== Early life ==
Donovan was born in 1876 in Lawrence, Massachusetts. The family moved to Philadelphia when Donovan was a baby. Donovan began playing baseball in Philadelphia's Fairmount Park and became a member of the Park Sparrows baseball team.

== Professional baseball player ==
=== Washington Senators (1898) ===
Donovan made his major league debut at age 21 with the Washington Senators on April 22, 1898. That year, he appeared in 20 games as an outfielder, 17 as a pitcher, and one game each as a shortstop and second baseman. As a pitcher, he compiled a 1–6 record with a 4.30 earned run average (ERA). He did not fare well at the plate either, compiling a .165 batting average in 103 at bats.

=== "Wild Bill" ===
By 1898, Donovan had earned the nickname "Wild Bill" for his lack of control. On June 3, one of his pitches hit Dummy Hoy in the ribs causing several hemorrhages. In his first six games, he reportedly "came within an ace of killing a man in each game". After a relief appearance in early July, a sports writer expressed surprise that "'Wild Bill' Donovan went to the slab and finished the game without killing a soul."

Later in his career, Donovan's control improved. Former umpire Billy Evans later wrote that the nickname was somewhat ironic because "control was Donovan's greatest asset" in the last ten years of his pitching career. Yet, the dangerous image conjured up by the nickname worked in Donovan's favor, as noted by Evans: "Realizing the value of psychology, [Donovan] made use of the fear that the name 'Wild Bill' carried to every American League batsman. Few hitters hugged the plate with Donovan pitching, and at opportune moment Bill would cut loose with a wild pitch that would heighten the fear."

=== Brooklyn Superbas (1899–1902) ===
Donovan began the 1899 season in the minor leagues with the Richmond Champions of the Atlantic League. He compiled a 17–4 record in 22 games for Richmond.

On July 27, 1899, he was purchased by the Brooklyn Superbas for $500. He appeared in only five games for Brooklyn in 1899, compiling a 1–2 record.

In 1900, he spent most of the season with the Hartford Indians of the Eastern League. He appeared in 40 games and compiled a 25–14 record with a 3.81 ERA in 347 innings pitched.

With a strong showing in Hartford, Donovan returned to Brooklyn and had one of the best seasons of his career. During the 1901 season, he appeared in 45 games, 38 as a starter, threw 36 complete games, and compiled a 25–15 record with a 2.77 ERA in 351 innings pitched. He led the National Leagues with 25 wins and 45 pitching appearances and ranked second with 226 strikeouts. He also led the league with 152 walks.

In 1902, Donovan returned to Brooklyn and appeared in 35 games, 33 as a starter, threw 30 complete games, and compiled a 17–15 record with a 2.78 ERA.

=== Detroit Tigers (1903–1912) ===
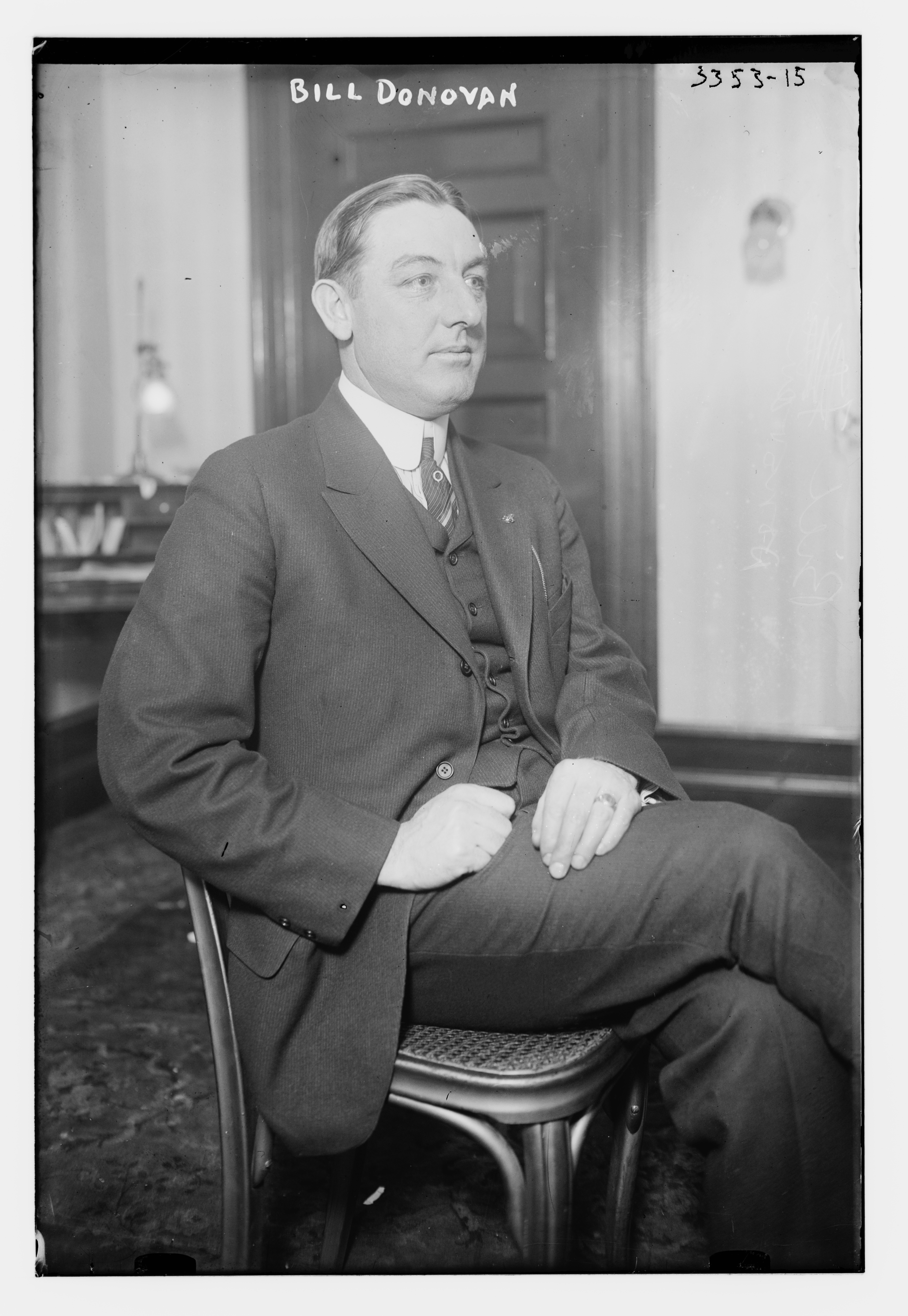
Donovan in 1910

Prior to the 1903 season, Donovan jumped to the Detroit Tigers of the American League. The move prompted litigation over Donovan's right to sign with the Tigers, with a resolution being reached allowing Donovan to join the Tigers. Donovan started 34 games for the Tigers in 1903 and led the American League with 34 complete games. He also ranked among the league's leaders with 187 strikeouts (second), a 7.0 wins above replacement rating for pitchers (third), and a 2.29 ERA (ninth).

Donovan continued as a workhouse for the Tigers, appearing in 34 games in 1904 and 1905 and 25 games in 1906 while compiling ERAs of 2.46, 2.60 and 3.15. On May 7, 1906, Donovan accomplished a rare feat when he stole second base, third, and on the front end of a double steal, took home in the fifth inning of an 8–3 victory over Cleveland. He also hit a triple in the same game.

In 1907, Donovan emerged as one of the best pitchers in the game while leading Detroit to the American League pennant. He appeared in 32 games and compiled a 25–4 record with a 2.19 ERA. His winning percentage of .862 led the American League. On September 30, 1907, with the Tigers and Athletics competing for the American League pennant, the two contenders met before a record crowd in Philadelphia. Donovan, who had defeated the Athletics three days earlier, was called on to clinch the pennant for the Tigers. Donovan pitched all 17 innings in the clinching game, holding Philadelphia scoreless for the final 10 innings until the game was called as a tie due to darkness.

Donovan started Game 1 of the 1907 World Series, and the Tigers led in the ninth inning with two outs and Chicago's Harry Steinfeldt on third base; Chicago pinch hitter Del Howard swung on a third strike that should have ended the game, but Detroit's catcher Boss Schmidt "missed the ball, which got by him to the crowd," allowing Steinfeldt to score the tying run. After Schmidt's error, Donovan held the Cubs scoreless for another four innings, but the game ended in a tie after 13 innings.

In 1908, Donovan appeared in 29 games and compiled an 18–7 record with a 2.08 ERA. And in 1909, he appeared in 24 games and compiled an 8–7 record with a 2.31 ERA. The Tigers won three consecutive American League pennants from 1907 to 1909. In three World Series, Donovan appeared in six games, all as a starter, pitched five complete games, and compiled a 1–4 record with a 2.88 ERA.

Donovan continued to pitch well in 1910, compiling a 17–7 record with a 2.44 ERA. However, in 1911, Donovan appeared in only 20 games (his fewest since 1900), and his ERA increased to 3.31 (his highest since 1900). In 1912, he started only one game (allowing one run in five innings on May 30) and made two relief appearances, compiling a 1–0 record and allowing one earned run in 10 innings pitched.

== Managerial and coaching career ==
=== Providence (1912–1914) ===
In August 1912, Donovan was assigned to become the manager for the Providence Grays, which was under common ownership with the Tigers. In 1913, the Grays finished with a 69–80 record. In 1914, Donovan turned the club around, leading the Grays to a 95–59 record and the International League pennant. Donovan also appeared in 20 games for the Grays from 1912 to 1914, compiling a 5–4 record.

Donovan managed rookie pitcher Babe Ruth for the final month of the 1914 season. Ruth won 10 of the 11 games in which he pitched for Donovan's Providence team.

=== New York Yankees (1915–1917) ===
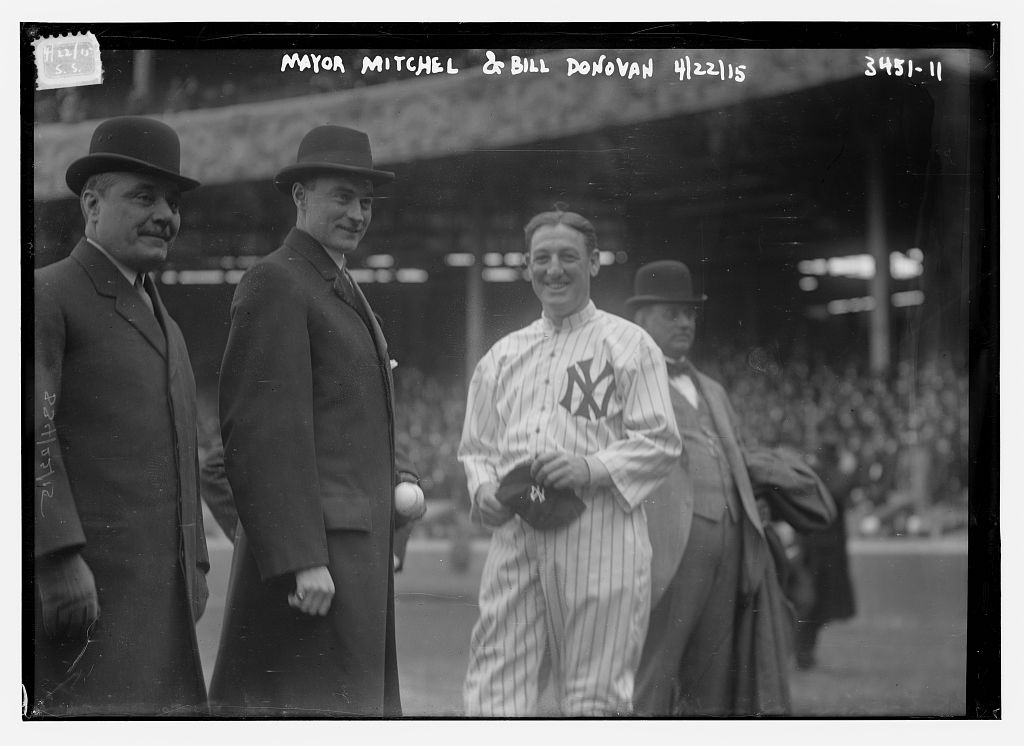
New York Mayor J.P. Michel, Jacob Ruppert and Donovan in 1915

In December 1914, at baseball's winter meetings in Chicago, Donovan was hired by the New York Yankees' new owners, Jacob Ruppert and Tillinghast L'Hommedieu Huston, as the club's new manager. Donovan took over a Yankees team that lacked stars and finished with a 70–84 record in 1914. The Yankees compiled a 69–83 record in their first year under Donovan, but improved to 80–74 in 1916 – the club's first winning record since 1910. In 1917, the Yankees lost multiple players to injury and regressed to 70–84. After the 1917 season, the Yankees hired Miller Huggins to replace Donovan as manager. Owner Ruppert later said of Donovan: "He was a wonderful fellow and great leader. . . . I still think that barring injuries and hard luck Bill Donovan would have brought the Yankees their first pennant. The hardest thing I ever had to do was release him."

During his 1915 and 1916 seasons, Donovan also appeared in 10 games as a pitcher for the Yankees, compiling a 0–3 record with a 4.67 ERA in 34 2/3 innings pitched.

=== Detroit Tigers (1918) ===
In February 1918, Donovan returned to the Tigers as a pitching coach and scout. At the time of his hiring, the Detroit Free Press wrote: "Donovan will be welcomed in Detroit. A more popular player never represented Detroit than the "Smiler" and his friends here are legion." The 1918 Detroit Tigers finished 20 games out of first place. On the last day of the 1918 season, Donovan, at age 41, went to the mound for a final game as the club's starting pitcher. Facing off against Eddie Cicotte of the Chicago White Sox, Donovan pitched five innings, gave up only one run, and won his 185th major league game.

=== Jersey City (1919–1920) ===
Donovan was hired as the manager of the Jersey City Skeeters of the International League. He was the manager of the Jersey City team in both 1919 and 1920.

=== Philadelphia Phillies (1921) ===
In December 1920, Donovan was hired as the manager of the Philadelphia Phillies. The Phillies had finished in last place in the National League in 1920, and team owner William Baker stated he was turning over full control of the team for rebuilding by Donovan. On August 9, 1921, Donovan was dismissed as the Phillies' manager. The dismissal was reportedly based on Baker's suspicion that Donovan had some knowledge of the Chicago White Sox' attempt to throw the 1919 World Series. Baseball commissioner Kenesaw Mountain Landis later vindicated Donovan of any wrongdoing and ordered Baker to send Donovan a letter of apology.

=== Hartford (1922–1923) ===
In December 1921, Donovan was hired as the manager of the New Haven Eastern League baseball club. Donovan's former Detroit teammate Ty Cobb was a co-owner of the New Haven club. Donovan led New Haven to the Eastern League pennant in 1922 and returned as manager for a second season in 1923.

=== Managerial record ===
Team	Year	Regular season					Postseason			
Team	Year	Games	Won	Lost	Win %	Finish	Won	Lost	Win %	Result
NYY	1915	152	69	83	.454	5th in AL	–	–	–	–
NYY	1916	154	80	74	.519	4th in AL	–	–	–	–
NYY	1917	153	71	82	.464	6th in AL	–	–	–	–
NYY total		459	220	239	.479		0	0	–	
PHI	1921	87	25	62	.287	fired	–	–	–	–
PHI total		87	25	62	.287		0	0	–	
Total		546	245	301	.449		0	0	–	

== Family and death ==
Donovan married Nellie Stephen in 1905. They were divorced in 1915.

In December 1923, Donovan was killed in a train wreck while traveling on the 20th Century Limited to attend baseball's winter meetings in Chicago. The train wrecked in Forsyth, New York, killing a total of nine persons. Donovan was buried at Holy Cross Cemetery in Yeadon, Pennsylvania.

== See also ==
- List of Major League Baseball annual saves leaders
- List of Major League Baseball annual wins leaders
- List of Major League Baseball player-managers
- List of Major League Baseball career hit batsmen leaders
