= Ensign Cottrell =

American baseball player (1888–1947)

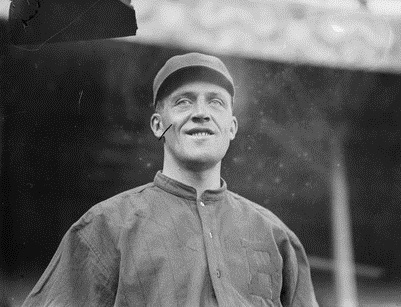
- Pitcher
- Born: August 29, 1888; Hoosick Falls, New York, U.S.
- Died: February 27, 1947 (aged 58); Syracuse, New York, U.S.
- Batted: Left Threw: Left

MLB debut
- June 21, 1911, for the Pittsburgh Pirates

Last MLB appearance
- July 9, 1915, for the New York Yankees

MLB statistics
- Win–loss record: 1–2
- Earned run average: 4.82
- Strikeouts: 12
- Stats at Baseball Reference

Teams
- Pittsburgh Pirates (1911); Chicago Cubs (1912); Philadelphia Athletics (1913); Boston Braves (1914); New York Yankees (1915)

Ensign Stover Cottrell (August 29, 1888 – February 27, 1947) was an American professional baseball pitcher who played in Major League Baseball from 1911 to 1915 with the Pittsburgh Pirates, Chicago Cubs, Philadelphia Athletics, Boston Braves, and New York Yankees.

== Early life and college career ==
Cottrell was born in Hoosick Falls, New York, the son of William Cottrell and Lottie Worthington Cottrell. He graduated from Hoosick Falls High School before moving on to Syracuse University in 1907, where he played on the baseball team for three years. He served as the team's captain his senior year, and threw a no-hitter in his final collegiate game against Columbia on June 13, 1911. He also earned a degree in civil engineering.

== Professional career ==
Cottrell, a left-handed pitcher, was recommended to Pittsburgh Pirates scout Howard Earl, and after pitcher Deacon Phillippe and scout Billy Murray saw him play, he was signed by Pittsburgh on June 10, 1911, after drawing interest from multiple major league teams, including the Cincinnati Reds and New York Giants.

He made his National League debut with the Pirates on June 21 against the Chicago Cubs, entering in the seventh inning with Pittsburgh trailing 7–1. He allowed four hits and four earned runs, with the Pirates ultimately losing 14–1. Pittsburgh released Cottrell in late August, having only pitched in one game, after club management felt he was not experienced enough to stay with the team.

After his release, Cottrell joined the Scranton Miners of the New York State League for the remainder of 1911, and resigned with the club for 1912.

During the 1912 season, he was claimed by both the Washington Senators and Chicago Cubs, with the Cubs earning the rights to his contract. He made what would be his only appearance with Chicago in the second game of a doubleheader against the Cincinnati Reds on September 27, 1912. Cottrell entered the game in the fourth inning and allowed four earned runs, as the Cubs lost 10–3. He recorded his first major league strikeout in the outing, his sole appearance for Chicago.

In November 1912, the Philadelphia Athletics put in a waiver claim on Cottrell, after he was mistakenly included on a list of players the Cubs had waived. He was signed by Philadelphia in January 1913.

He would only appear in two games all season, pitching 1.0 inning on April 23 against the New York Yankees, and throwing a complete game on June 5 against the Detroit Tigers, winning 10–6. He also hit a bases loaded double in the sixth inning, driving in three runs in what would be his only major league hit.

On June 17, he was sold to the Baltimore Orioles of the International League. He finished the year with a 14-8 win–loss record in 32 games with Baltimore. He remained with the Orioles for the start of the 1914 season, going 13–7 with a 2.40 earned run average in 26 games, before he was sold to the Boston Braves on July 28. Cottrell would appear in only one game with Boston, earning the start against the Pirates on August 7. He threw just 1.2 innings, allowed two hits and two runs, one of which was earned, and walked three batters as the losing pitcher in the 5–1 loss to Pittsburgh. Though Boston would ultimately win the 1914 World Series against the Athletics, Cottrell would only receive $500 of the winner's share, as both he Billy Martin, who also only appeared in one game all season, were denied full shares by the rest of the team.

In April 1915, he was placed on waivers by Boston due to a limit of 21-players per roster and sold to the New York Yankees after all other National League clubs passed on him. Cottrell made his Yankees debut on May 27 against the Chicago White Sox, pitching 6.1 innings in relief while allowing two earned runs in an 8–2 loss. After pitching in three games in June and three more in July, Cottrell was waived to the Richmond Climbers. He finished the 1915 season with a 7–11 record in 20 games for Richmond.

== Post-playing career ==
Cottrell's rights were sold back to the Yankees, but he retired in 1916 to pursue an engineering degree from Rensselaer Polytechnic Institute. In August 1917, he married Evelyn Taylor and had three children.

After his retirement from professional baseball, he pitched for an industrial team in Auburn, New York in 1918.

Cottrell later operated an engineering and surveying business in Syracuse. He died on February 27, 1947, in Syracuse of a cerebral hemorrhage.
