= Tom Daley (baseball) =

American baseball player (1884–1934)

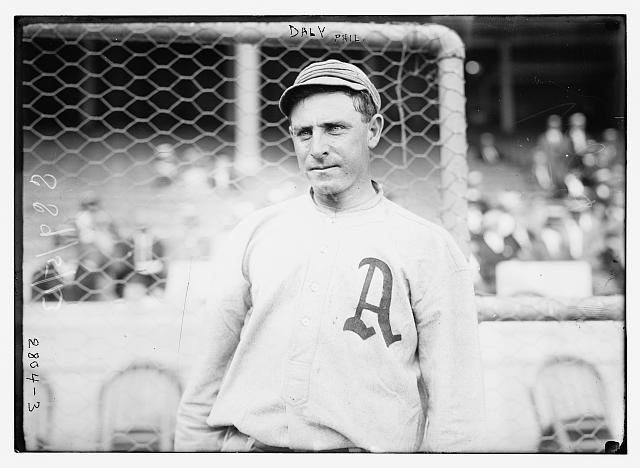
- Daley at the Polo Grounds in 1913
- Outfielder
- Born: November 13, 1884; DuBois, Pennsylvania, U.S.
- Died: December 2, 1934 (aged 50); Los Angeles, California, U.S.
- Batted: Left Threw: Right

MLB debut
- August 29, 1908, for the Cincinnati Reds

Last MLB appearance
- July 9, 1915, for the New York Yankees

MLB statistics
- Batting average: .239
- Home runs: 0
- Runs batted in: 29
- Stats at Baseball Reference

Teams
- Cincinnati Reds (1908); Philadelphia Athletics (1913–1914); New York Yankees (1914–1915)

Thomas Francis Daley (November 13, 1884 – December 2, 1934) was an American professional baseball player. Daley played for multiple teams during his career. He played for the Cincinnati Reds in 1908, the Philadelphia Athletics in 1912 and 1913, and the New York Yankees in 1914–1915.

== Life ==
Tom Daley was born on November 13, 1884, in Dubois, Pennsylvania. A professional baseball player, he played for multiple teams, including the Cincinnati Reds (1908), the Philadelphia Athletics (1912 and 1913), and the New York Yankees (1914–1915).

He died at the age of 50 in Los Angeles, California, on December 2, 1934, and was interred at that city's Calvary Cemetery.
