= Bob Shawkey =

American baseball player and manager (1890-1980)

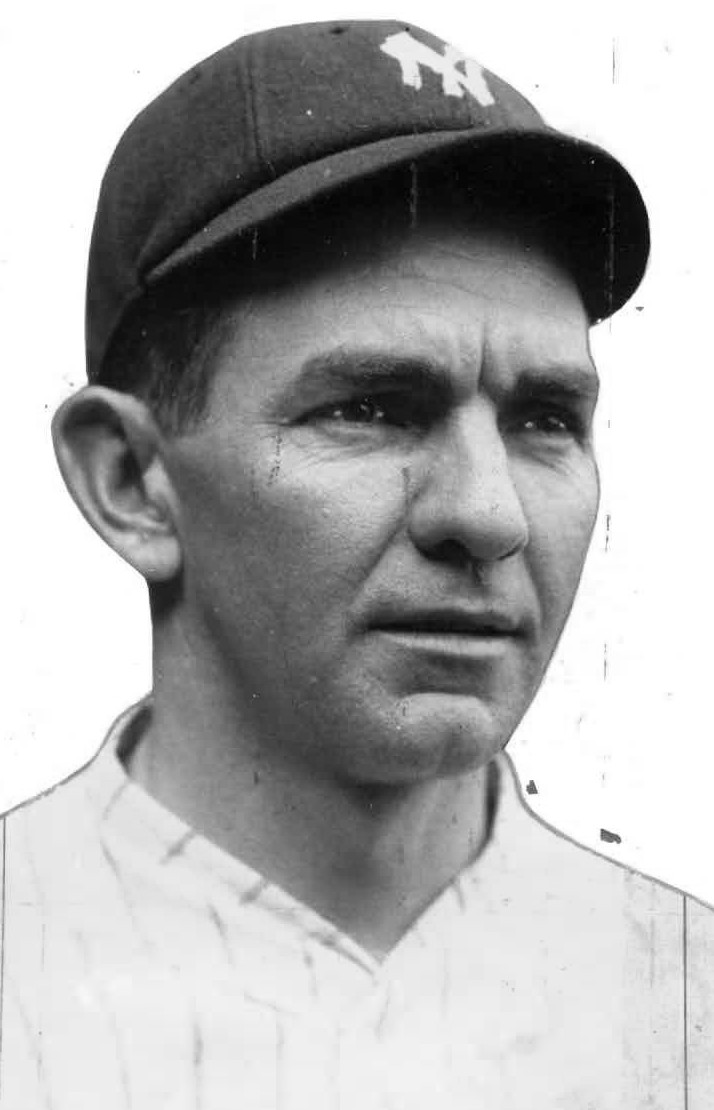
- Shawkey pitching for the New York Yankees in 1922
- Pitcher / Manager
- Born: December 4, 1890; Sigel, Pennsylvania, U.S.
- Died: December 31, 1980 (aged 90); Syracuse, New York, U.S.
- Batted: Right Threw: Right

MLB debut
- July 16, 1913, for the Philadelphia Athletics

Last MLB appearance
- September 29, 1927, for the New York Yankees

MLB statistics
- Win–loss record: 195–150
- Earned run average: 3.09
- Strikeouts: 1,360
- Managerial record: 86–68
- Winning %: .558
- Stats at Baseball Reference

Teams
- As player: Philadelphia Athletics (1913–1915); New York Yankees (1915–1927); As manager: New York Yankees (1930)

Career highlights and awards
- 3× World Series champion (1913, 1923, 1927); AL ERA leader (1920)

James Robert Shawkey (December 4, 1890 – December 31, 1980) was an American baseball pitcher who played fifteen seasons in Major League Baseball (MLB). He played for the Philadelphia Athletics and New York Yankees from 1915 to 1927. He batted and threw right-handed and served primarily as a starting pitcher.

== Early life ==
Shawkey was born to John William Shawkey (descended from German immigrants named Schaake) and Sarah Catherine Anthony, in Sigel, Pennsylvania.

== Professional career ==
He moved from Slippery Rock State College to an independent league in 1911, then to the American League in 1912 as a pitcher for Connie Mack's Philadelphia Athletics. In 1915, Mack sold him to the New York Yankees where he remained (except for a brief service with the U.S. Navy during World War I when he served on the battleship Arkansas for eight months) until 1931. While facing his former team in 1919, he struck out 15 A's batters in a game, setting the Yankees team record for most strikeouts in a game; this record lasted for fifty-nine years.

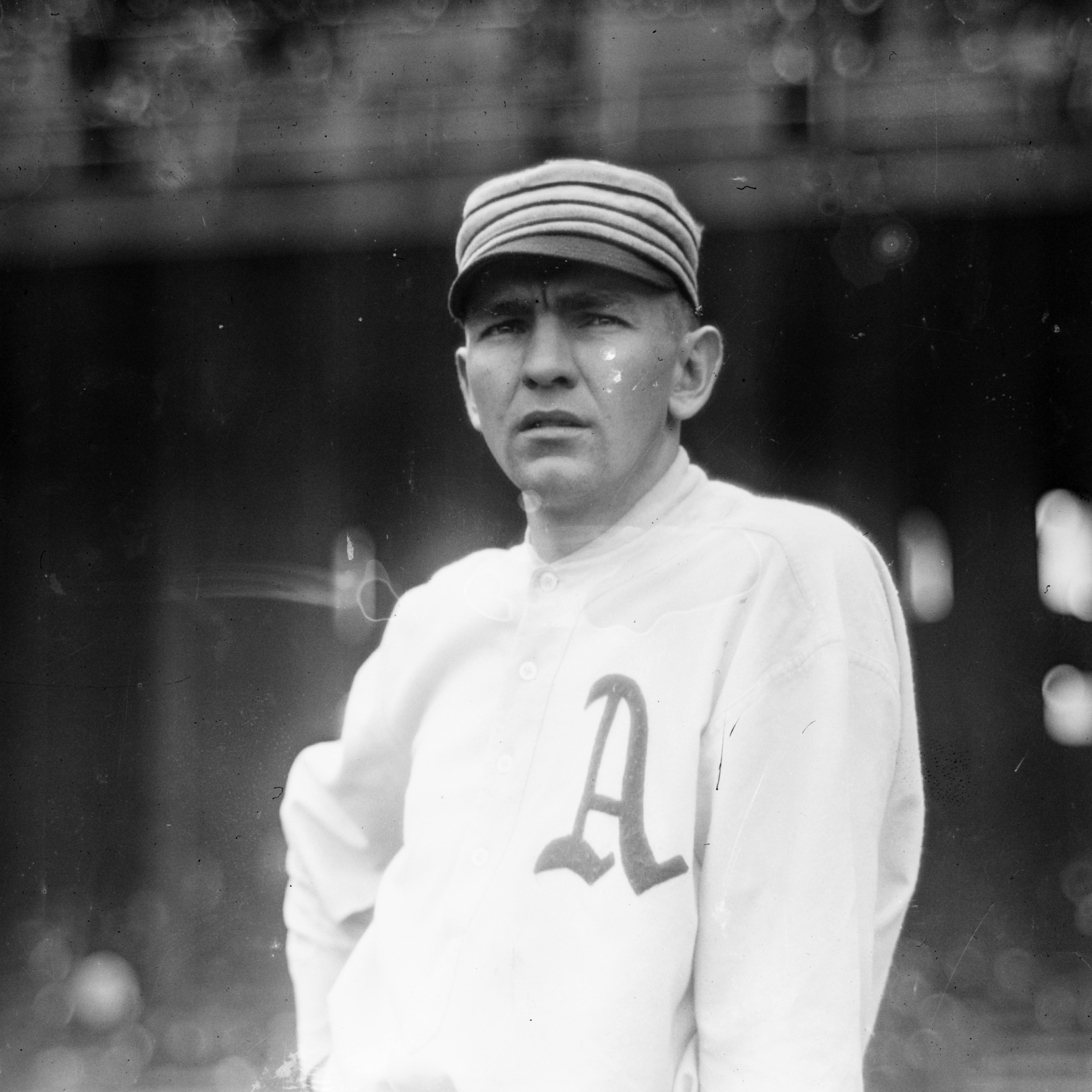
Shawkey as a member of the Philadelphia Athletics.

At the start of the 1923 season, Shawkey was chosen to be the Yankees' Opening Day starting pitcher. Because the team's first game was at home, this also meant that he was the first player to pitch at the newly built Yankee Stadium. The Yankees won 4–1 behind Babe Ruth's three-run home run, with Shawkey pitching a complete game to become the first winning pitcher at the stadium.

Shawkey also served as the Yankees' manager in the 1930 season—following the sudden death of Miller Huggins—and guided the Yankees to a third-place finish.

Shawkey won 195 games in his career, and won 20 or more games in four of his seasons (his high was 24). Shawkey is noted as the starting pitcher in the first game played in Yankee Stadium on April 18, 1923, and set the franchise record for 15 strikeouts in a single game, which stood until Ron Guidry broke it in 1978. Bob credited his success to a super fastball and an outstanding curve ball. He later served as the baseball coach for Dartmouth College.

An adept batsman during his 15 year career, Shawkey compiled a .214 batting average (225-for-1049) with 90 runs, 3 home runs and 95 RBI. From 1920-1924, he drove in 59 runs for the New York Yankees. In 8 World Series games, he hit .267 (4-for-15) with 2 RBI.

In 1970, Shawkey was inducted into the Pennsylvania Sports Hall of Fame in Brookville, Pennsylvania. During the 1976 opening day festivities for the renovated Yankee Stadium, Shawkey threw out the ceremonial first pitch.

Shawkey died at the Veterans Administration hospital in Syracuse, New York on December 31, 1980. He was buried at Oakwood–Morningside Cemetery in Syracuse on January 5, 1981.

== Managerial record ==
Team	Year	Regular season					Postseason			
Team	Year	Games	Won	Lost	Win %	Finish	Won	Lost	Win %	Result
NYY	1930	154	86	68	.558	3rd in AL	–	–	–	–
Total		154	86	68	.558		0	0	–	

== See also ==
- List of Major League Baseball annual ERA leaders
- List of Major League Baseball annual saves leaders
