= Emery =

Emery may refer to:

== Places ==
- Emery High School (disambiguation)
- Emery House (disambiguation)

=== Canada ===
- Emery, Toronto, a neighbourhood in Toronto, Ontario, Canada

=== United States ===
- Emery, Arizona, a populated place
- Emery, Illinois
- Emery, Michigan
- Emery, Ohio, a ghost town
- Emery Park, a park in Erie County, New York
- Emery, North Carolina
- Emery, South Dakota, a city
- Emery County, Utah
  - Emery, Utah, a town in Emery County
- Emery Farm (Durham, New Hampshire)
- Emery Farm (Stratham, New Hampshire), on the National Register of Historic Places
- Emery Farmstead, Port Angeles, Washington, on the National Register of Historic Places
- Emery, Wisconsin, a town
- Emery School, a former school building in Biddeford, Maine, on the National Register of Historic Places
- Emery Theatre, an historic multi-purpose theatre in Cincinnati, Ohio

=== Elsewhere ===
- Mount Emery, a mountain on West Falkland, Falkland Islands

== Businesses ==
- Emery Oleochemicals, a chemical company headquartered in Malaysia
- Emery Telcom, a telecommunications company in Utah
- Emery Worldwide Airlines, a former cargo airline headquartered in Redwood City, California

== Other uses ==
- Emery (band), a post-hardcore band from Rock Hill, South Carolina
- Emery (name), a given name or surname, with a list of people of this name
- Emery (rock), dark granular rock used to make an abrasive powder
  - Emery board, a type of nail file coated with emery
    - Emery ball, the use of an emery board to alter a sports ball
  - Emery cloth, an abrasive cloth coated in emery particles
  - Emery paper, an abrasive paper coated in emery particles
- Operation Emery, a series of American nuclear tests (1970-1971)

== See also ==
- Emory (disambiguation)
- Emery Down, village in Hampshire, England, United Kingdom
