= Emery House =

Emery House, and variations, may refer to:

- William H. Emery Jr. House, Elmhurst, IL, listed on the NRHP in Illinois
- Emery Hall, Wilberforce, OH, listed on the NRHP in Ohio
- James Emery House, Bucksport, ME, listed on the NRHP in Maine
- Emery House (Highpine, Maine), listed on the NRHP in Maine
- Steward–Emery House, North Anson, ME, listed on the NRHP in Maine
- Emery Homestead, Sanford, ME, listed on the NRHP in Maine
- Smith–Emery House, Springvale, ME, listed on the NRHP in Maine
- Emery Houses, Lansing, MI, listed on the NRHP in Michigan
- Abram Emery House, Zanesville, OH, listed on the NRHP in Ohio
- Welsh–Emery House, Richeyville, PA, listed on the NRHP in Pennsylvania
- Emery Farmstead, Port Angeles, WA, listed on the NRHP in Washington
