= Emery Farm =

Emery Farm may refer to:

- Emery Farm (Durham, New Hampshire), a continually owned family farm since 1655
- Emery Farm (Stratham, New Hampshire), on the National Register of Historic Places

== See also ==
- Emery Farmstead, Port Angeles, Washington, on the National Register of Historic Places
