= Emory =

Emory may refer to:

== Places ==
- Emory, Texas, U.S.
- Emory (crater), on the Moon
- Emory Peak, in Texas, U.S.
- Emory River, in Tennessee, U.S.

== Education ==
- Emory and Henry College, or simply Emory, in Emory, Virginia, U.S.
- Emory University, in Atlanta, Georgia, U.S.

== Other uses ==
- Emory (name), a given name and surname, including a list of people and fictional characters with the name
- Emory Marketing Institute, an American non-profit innovation research group

== See also ==
- Emery (disambiguation)
- Emory Creek Provincial Park, in British Columbia, Canada
- Emory and Henry College Hospital
- Quercus emoryi, or Emory oak
- Carex emoryi, or Emory's sedge
- USS Emory S. Land, a United States Navy submarine tender
