= Robert William Weir Carrall =

Canadian politician (1837–1879)

The Honourable Robert William Weir Carrall
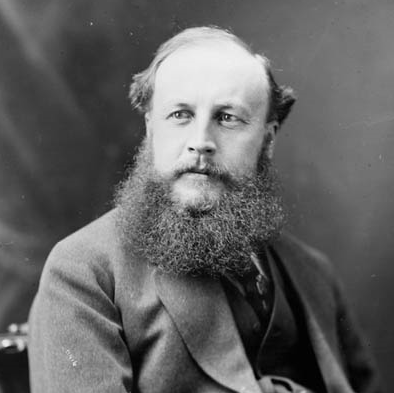
- The Hon. Robert William Weir Carrall, April 1872

Canadian Senator from British Columbia
- In office 1871–1879

Personal details
- Born: February 2, 1837 Carrall’s Grove, near Woodstock, Upper Canada
- Died: September 19, 1879 (aged 42) Carrall’s Grove, Ontario, Canada
- Party: Conservative

Robert William Weir Carrall (February 2, 1837 – September 19, 1879) was a Canadian medical doctor and politician

== Background ==
Born in Carrall's Grove, near Woodstock, Upper Canada, the son of James and Jane Carrall, Carrall received his MD from McGill University in 1859. He practiced in British North America for a bit before becoming an assistant surgeon for the Union Army during the American Civil War working in Emory and Henry College Hospital (1862 to 1863) and at the Marine United States General Hospital at New Orleans (1863 to 1865).

In 1865, he moved to Nanaimo, British Columbia, where he worked as a medical doctor. In 1867, he moved to Barkerville where he also invested in mines. A supporter of confederation, he was elected to the Legislative Council of British Columbia in 1868 and served until 1871. From 1870 to 1871, he was a member of the Executive Council. He was one of three delegates who went to Ottawa to talk about the terms of British Columbia joining Canada. In 1871, he was summoned to the Senate of Canada. In 1879, he introduced a bill to make July 1 a public holiday to be called Dominion Day (now called Canada Day), which was later passed. He served until his death.

Carrall Street in Vancouver, British Columbia is named in his honour.
