= Earle Gardner =

American baseball player (1884–1943)

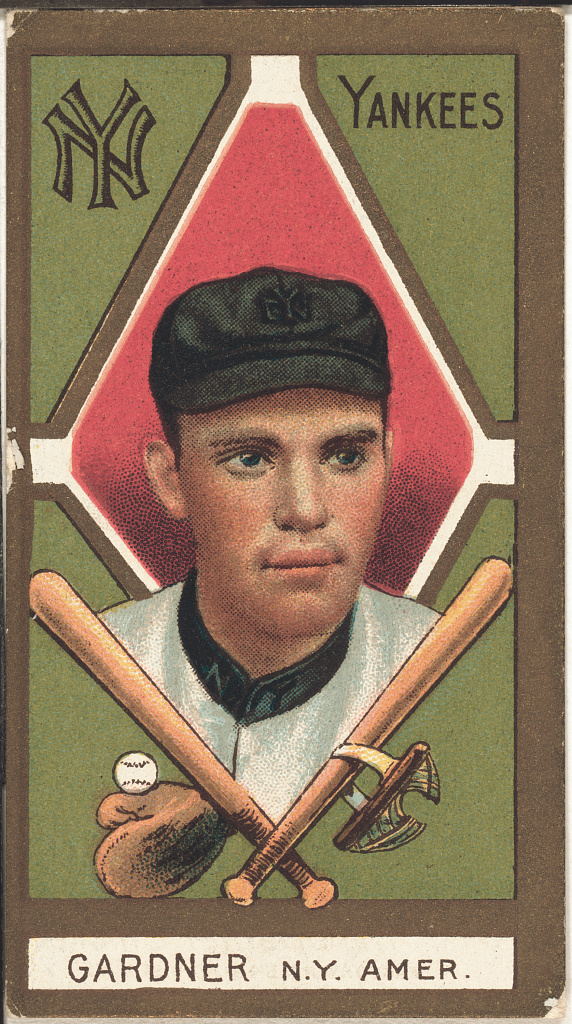
- 1911 baseball card of Gardner
- Second baseman
- Born: January 24, 1884; Sparta, Illinois, U.S.
- Died: March 2, 1943 (aged 59); Sparta, Illinois, U.S.
- Batted: Right Threw: Right

MLB debut
- September 18, 1908, for the New York Highlanders

Last MLB appearance
- June 22, 1912, for the New York Highlanders

MLB statistics
- Batting average: .263
- Home runs: 1
- Runs batted in: 108
- Stats at Baseball Reference

Teams
- New York Highlanders (1908–1912)

Earle McClurkin Gardner (January 24, 1884 – March 2, 1943) was an American professional baseball second baseman. He played in Major League Baseball for the New York Highlanders from 1908 to 1912.

== Career ==
Gardner played for the Springfield Foot Trackers of the Illinois–Indiana–Iowa League in 1903. Springfield released him before the 1904 season. He got a tryout with the Chicago Cubs of the National League in 1904, but was farmed to the San Antonio Bronchos of the South Texas League for the 1904 season. San Antonio sold Gardner to the Beaumont Millionaires of the South Texas League during the 1905 season. In 1906, he played for the Austin Senators of the South Texas League. The Senators sold Gardner to the St. Paul Saints of the American Association after the 1906 season, but purchased him back from St. Paul before the 1907 season.

During the 1907 season, the St. Louis Browns of the American League purchased Gardner's contract. He tried out with the Browns in spring training in 1908, but did not make the team. Gardner played for the Hartford Senators of the Connecticut State League during the 1908 season.

The New York Highlanders of the American League drafted Gardner from Hartford in September 1908, and he made his major league debut with the Highlanders. In 20 games played, he had a .213 batting average. He caught malaria during spring training in 1909, and missed his chance to make the Highlanders' Opening Day roster. After he recovered, New York farmed Gardner to the Jersey City Skeeters of the Eastern League. After his strong 1909 season with Jersey City, the Highlanders recalled Gardner in September. He played 22 games for the Highlanders, and batted .329. In 1910, Highlanders pitcher Russ Ford, who had learned how to throw the emery ball, confided his secret only with Ed Sweeney, his catcher, as well as Gardner and Eddie Foster, his roommates. That year, he batted .244 in 86 games, and hit his only major league home run.

Gardner batted .263 in 102 games during the 1911 season. As part of a shakeup of the team, the Highlanders released Gardner and some of his teammates in July 1912. He signed with the Cleveland Naps of the American League, who traded him to the Toledo Iron Men of the American Association for Ray Chapman. Gardner had batted .281 in 43 games for the Highlanders before the release.

While playing with Toledo in 1912, Gardner taught Cy Falkenberg how to throw the emery ball. Gardner returned to Toledo in 1913. When the Toledo franchise relocated to Cleveland as the Cleveland Bearcats, Gardner played for them during the 1914 and 1915 seasons. The franchise moved back to Toledo in 1916, and he remained with the team. Toledo released Gardner before the 1917 season, and he played for the Los Angeles Angels of the Pacific Coast League that year.

== Personal life ==
Gardner's brother, Dewitt, also played baseball.

Gardner was a native of Sparta, Illinois. He died in Sparta on March 2, 1943.
