= Russ Ford =

Canadian baseball player

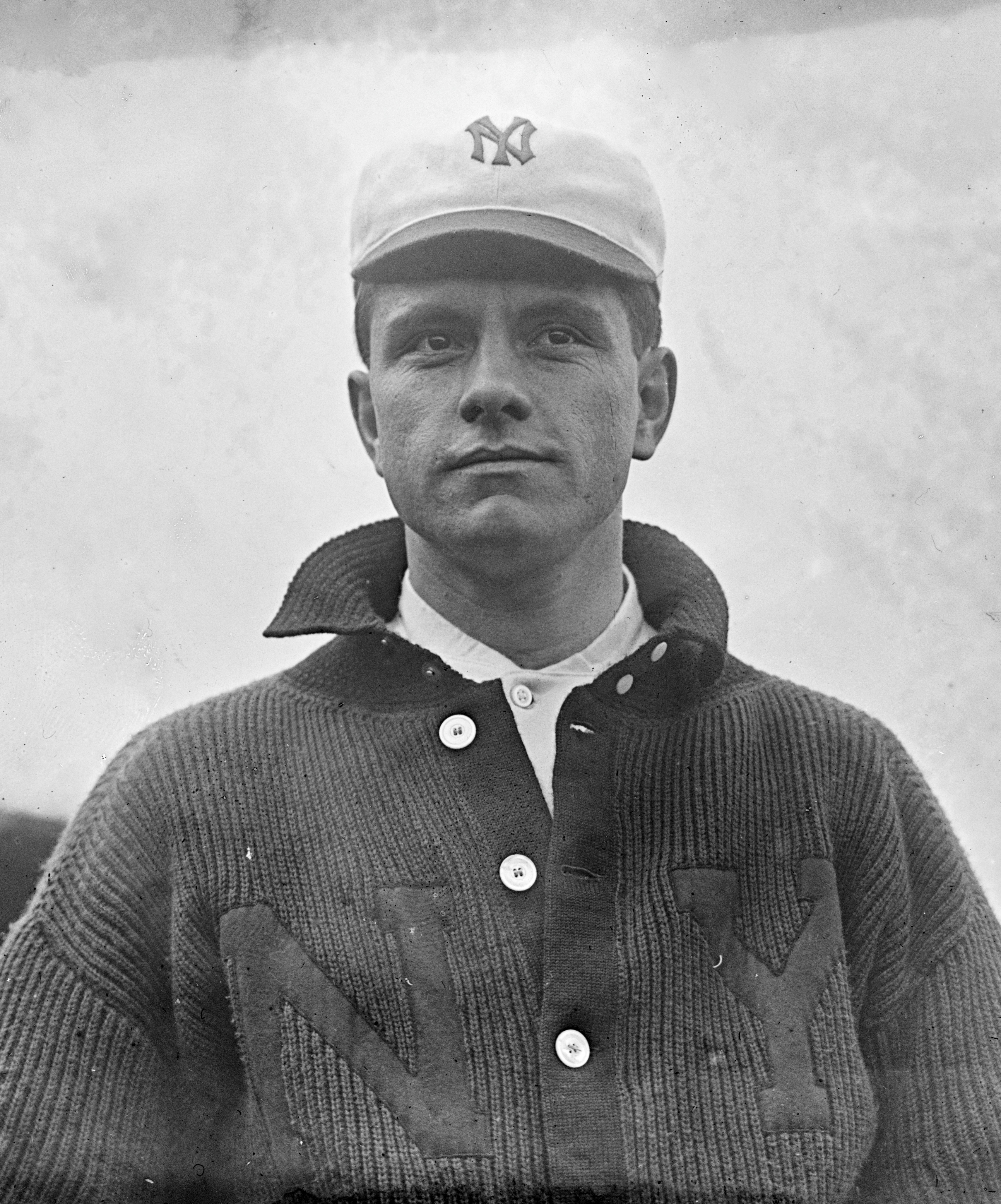
- Ford in 1911
- Pitcher
- Born: April 25, 1883; Brandon, Manitoba, Canada
- Died: January 24, 1960 (aged 76); Rockingham, North Carolina, U.S.
- Batted: Right Threw: Right

MLB debut
- April 28, 1909, for the New York Highlanders

Last MLB appearance
- August 16, 1915, for the Buffalo Blues

MLB statistics
- Win–loss record: 100–71
- Earned run average: 2.59
- Strikeouts: 710
- Stats at Baseball Reference

Teams
- New York Highlanders / Yankees (1909–1913); Buffalo Buffeds / Blues (1914–1915)

Member of the Canadian

Baseball Hall of Fame
- Induction: 1987

Russell William Ford (April 25, 1883 – January 24, 1960) was a Canadian-American professional baseball pitcher. He played in Major League Baseball for the New York Highlanders / Yankees of the American League from 1909 to 1913 and for the Buffalo Buffeds / Blues of the Federal League in 1914 and 1915. Ford is credited with developing the emery ball.

Born in Manitoba, Ford grew up in Minneapolis, Minnesota, where he began his baseball career. After he noticed how the ball moved after it was scuffed, he mastered how to doctor the baseball with a piece of emery paper hidden in his baseball glove. Using the pitch, Ford won 26 games in his rookie year with the Highlanders in 1910. After the pitch was outlawed in 1914, Ford's results declined, and his career ended in 1917. He is a member of the Canadian Baseball Hall of Fame and the Manitoba Sports Hall of Fame and Museum.

== Early life ==
Ford was born in Brandon, Manitoba, on April 25, 1883. He was the third of five children born to Walter and Ida Ford. His mother was a second cousin of Grover Cleveland, who served as president of the United States. The Ford family moved to the United States when he was three years old, and settled in Minneapolis, Minnesota when he was 10 years old. He played sandlot ball in Minneapolis.

Russ' older brother, Gene Ford, also played in the major leagues. Gene pitched in seven games for the Detroit Tigers in 1905. His younger brother, Walter, played in the minor leagues.

== Baseball career ==
=== Early career ===
Ford made his professional baseball debut in the Northern League with a team based in Enderlin, North Dakota, in 1904, but the team folded during the season. He continued playing in the 1904 season with a team in Lisbon, North Dakota. After a recommendation by his older brother, Ford was signed by Bill Watkins, the manager of the Minneapolis Millers of the American Association, in July 1904. In April 1905, Watkins sold him to the Springfield Senators of the Illinois–Indiana–Iowa League. In 1906, he pitched for the Cedar Rapids Rabbits of the Illinois–Indiana–Iowa League. At the end of the 1906 season, the Atlanta Crackers of the Southern Association drafted Ford from Cedar Rapids.

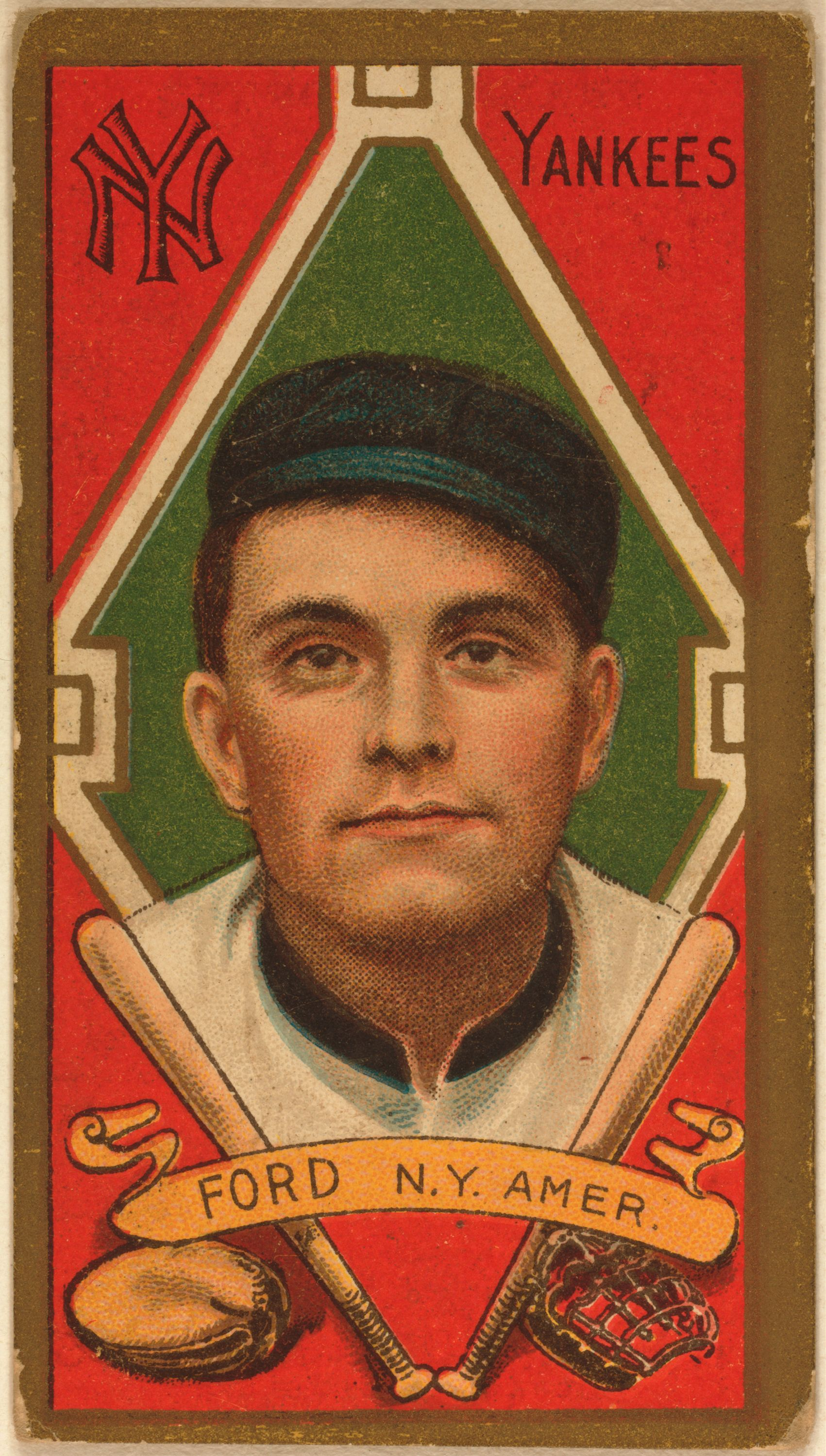
A 1911 baseball card of Ford

In 1907, Ford discovered the emery ball, a pitch that was thrown with a ball that had been scuffed with a piece of emery. Ford came across the pitch by accident. When warming up with catcher Ed Sweeney under a grandstand due to rain, Ford accidentally threw a ball into a wooden upright, marking the surface. Ford threw another pitch with the damaged ball, and noticed how it curved more than previous pitches. He continued to study the effects of the rough patch on the wind resistance of the baseball when practicing, but did not yet begin to use it in a game.

Ford returned to Atlanta for the 1908 season, and his pitching began to draw attention from major league teams. The New York Highlanders of the American League purchased Ford from the Crackers.

=== Major leagues ===
Ford made his major league debut for the Highlanders against the Boston Red Sox on April 28, 1909, as a relief pitcher. He pitched three innings, allowing four runs on four hits, four walks, and three hit by pitches. After the game, the Highlanders demoted Ford to the Jersey City Skeeters of the Eastern League, where he spent the rest of the 1909 season. With Jersey City, he began to use the emery ball during games by hiding a piece of emery paper in his baseball glove. He pretended to be throwing a spitball, which was still legal at the time.

Ford pitched for the Highlanders in 1910, and tried to disguise his emery ball as a "slide ball", a type of spitball that could move side-to-side, in addition to up and down. Ford won 26 games against six losses for the Highlanders, and threw complete games in all 26 wins. He also had a 1.65 earned run average (ERA), which was the seventh-best in the American League, and 209 strikeouts, which was the fourth-most. Ford also shared the secret of his emery ball with teammates Eddie Foster and Earle Gardner, who he roomed with when the Highlanders were traveling.

For the 1911 season, the Highlanders paid Ford a $5,500 salary ($185,605 in current dollar terms), second-highest on the team behind only Hal Chase, the first baseman and manager. In 1911, Ford won 22 games and lost 11. He also had a 2.27 ERA, which was the seventh-best in the American League, and 158 strikeouts, which was the fifth-most. In 1912, he only won 13 games while losing 21, and his strikeout total decreased to 112. His 21 losses, 115 earned runs, and 11 home runs allowed were the most in the American League. Ford had 13 wins, 18 losses, and a 2.66 ERA in the 1913 season, with only 72 strikeouts. During the 1913 season, Ford announced that he was giving up the spitball because of the strain that it put on his shoulder and wrist.

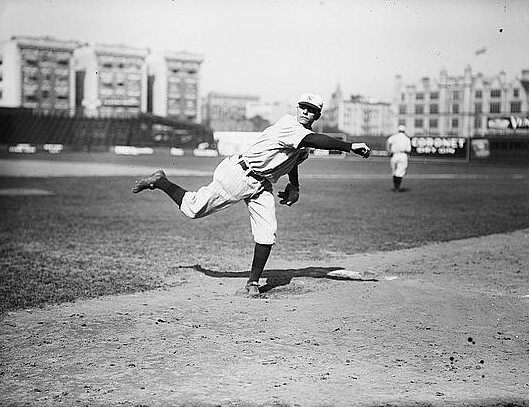
Ford pitching in 1912

New York attempted to cut Ford's salary before the 1914 season, so he jumped to the Buffalo Buffeds of the outlaw Federal League. He had a 21–6 win–loss record for Buffalo in 1914 with 123 strikeouts; his .778 winning percentage was the best in the Federal League that year, and his 1.82 ERA was the second-best, behind Claude Hendrix. He was reported to be using a knuckleball during the 1914 season.

=== Later career ===
In September 1914, Ray Keating, who had learned the emery ball from Sweeney, was caught using it. The major leagues decided to ban the pitch, with Ban Johnson, president of the American League, calling for a $100 fine ($3,139 in current dollar terms) and a 30-day suspension for anyone caught attempting it. The other major leagues followed suit.

Unable to use the emery ball, Ford struggled as he attempted to develop a new pitch, and was released from Buffalo during July. He was re-signed later in the month. Ford won five games and lost nine, with a 4.52 ERA, for the 1915 season.

Following the collapse of the Federal League, his contractual rights reverted to the Yankees, who gave him his unconditional release. Returning to the minor leagues, Ford pitched for the Denver Bears of the Western League in 1916 and 1917. In July 1917, Denver sold Ford to the Toledo Iron Men of the American Association. In 1918, he was playing in a semi-professional league.

In 1922, Ford and Bee Lawler served as the coaches for the Minnesota Golden Gophers baseball team, the college baseball team representing the University of Minnesota.

== Personal life and honors ==
Ford married Mary Hunter Bethell in 1912. They had two daughters.

After his retirement from baseball, Ford graduated from college. His family moved to Rockingham, North Carolina, near Mary's hometown, of Reidsville, in 1923. He went into banking and worked as a cashier in a local bank. In the 1930s, he worked for an engineering firm in New York City as a draftsman.

Mary died in 1957. When she did, Ford moved back to Rockingham, and lived a quiet life in retirement. Ford died of a heart attack on January 24, 1960, in Rockingham.

Ford was posthumously elected to the Canadian Baseball Hall of Fame in 1987, into the Manitoba Sports Hall of Fame and Museum in 2002, and into the Manitoba Baseball Hall of Fame in 2004.

== See also ==
- List of Major League Baseball annual saves leaders
- List of Major League Baseball career ERA leaders
- List of Major League Baseball career WHIP leaders
