= Ray Keating =

American baseball player (1893–1963)

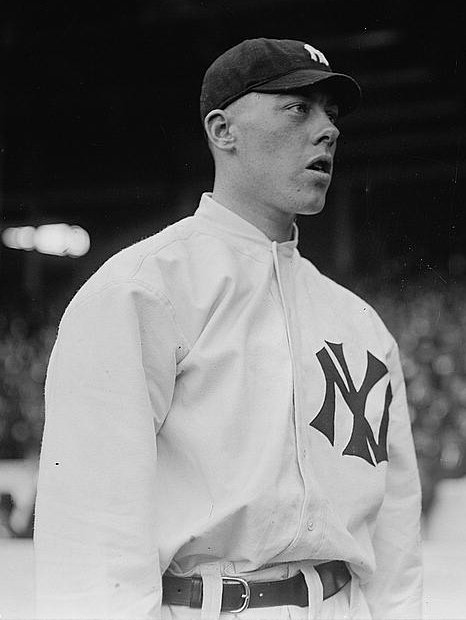
- Keating in 1913
- Pitcher
- Born: July 21, 1893; Bridgeport, Connecticut, U.S.
- Died: December 28, 1963 (aged 70); Sacramento, California, U.S.
- Batted: Right Threw: Right

MLB debut
- September 12, 1912, for the New York Highlanders

Last MLB appearance
- September 9, 1919, for the Boston Braves

MLB statistics
- Win–loss record: 30–51
- Earned run average: 3.29
- Strikeouts: 349
- Stats at Baseball Reference

Teams
- New York Highlanders / Yankees (1912–1916, 1918); Boston Braves (1919)

Raymond Herbert Keating (July 21, 1893 – December 28, 1963) was an American professional baseball pitcher. He played in Major League Baseball for the New York Highlanders / Yankees of the American League from 1912 to 1916 and in 1918 and for the Boston Braves of the National League in 1919. In 1914, Keating was caught throwing an emery ball, and the pitch was declared to be illegal.

== Career ==
=== Early life and career ===
Raymond Herbert Keating was born on July 21, 1893, in Bridgeport, Connecticut. He played semi-professional baseball in Bridgeport in 1908 and 1909. He tried out with the Bridgeport Orators of the Connecticut State League in 1910, but did not make the team, and he enrolled at Niagara University to play college baseball as a pitcher for the Niagara Purple Eagles.

In 1911, Keating signed a professional contract with the Lawrence Barristers of the New England League. The Barristers assigned him to the Hamilton Kolts of the Canadian League where he made his professional baseball debut. Hamilton's manager, a former spitball pitcher, taught Keating how to throw the spitball. Keating pitched for Lawrence in the 1912 season, and he won 25 of the 35 games he pitched.

=== Major leagues ===
The New York Highlanders of the American League purchased Keating's contract from Lawrence for $5,000 ($166,810 in current dollar terms) during the season. After the New England League's season finished in early September, Keating reported to the Highlanders. He made his major league debut on September 12, 1912, as a relief pitcher, recording three strikeouts in one inning pitched. Keating appeared in six games for the Highlanders in 1912; he had an 0–3 win–loss record, three complete games, and a 5.80 earned run average (ERA) in 1912. The next year, he had a 6–12 win–loss record and a 3.21 ERA in 28 games, with nine complete games. Frank Chance, the Highlanders' manager, reported that Keating was almost exclusively a spitball pitcher.

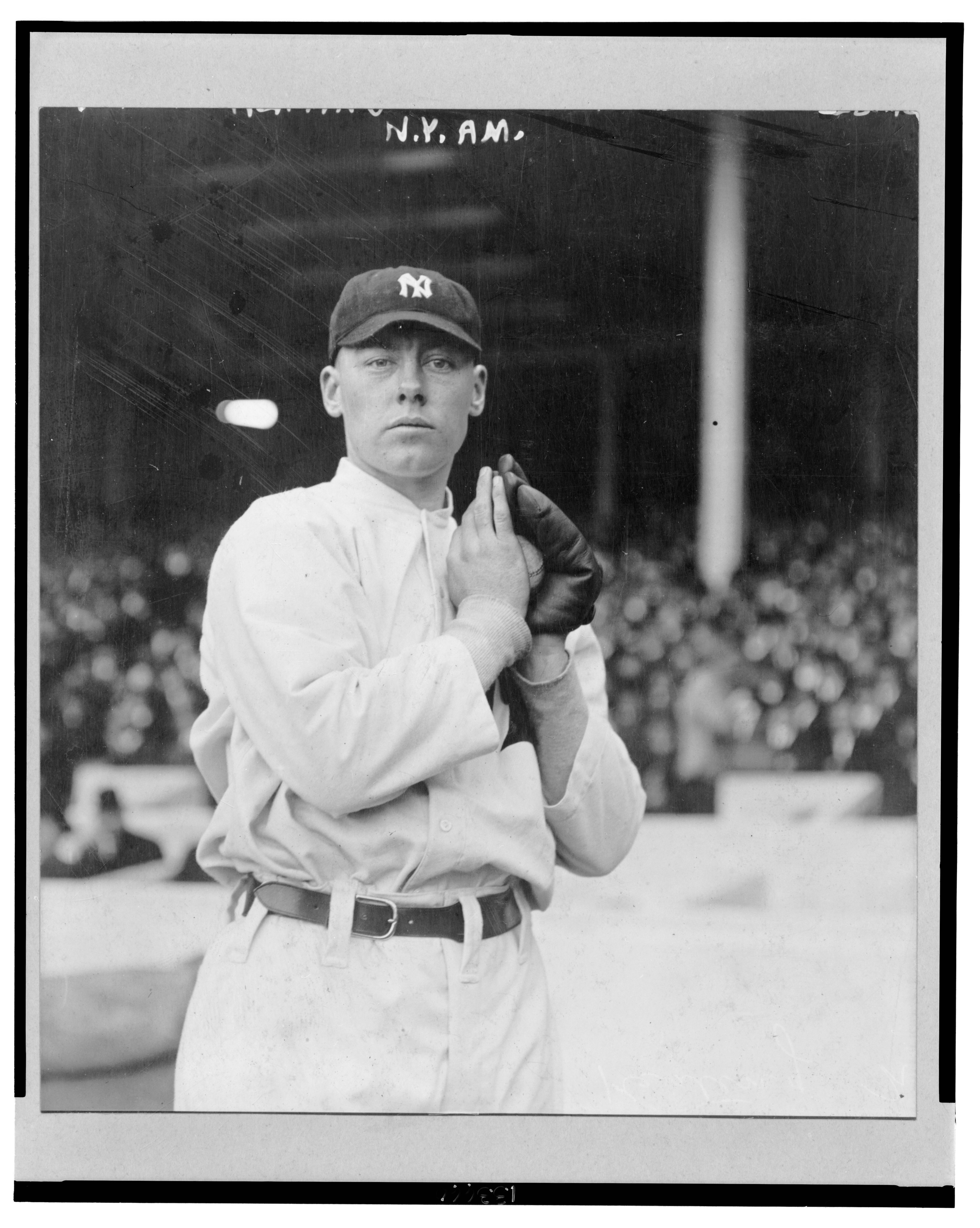
Keating with the Yankees in 1913

In 1914, catcher Ed Sweeney taught Keating how to throw the emery ball; Sweeney had learned about it from Russ Ford, who jumped to the outlaw Federal League before the 1914 season. Keating was caught using the emery ball when Eddie Collins became suspicious after striking out against Keating in a game on September 12, 1914, and had the home plate umpire, Tom Connolly, check the ball, finding it to be scuffed. Connolly also took Keating's baseball glove, and found the emery paper hid inside. Ban Johnson, the president of the American League, outlawed the pitch, and said that anyone caught throwing it would be fined $100 ($3,214 in current dollar terms) and suspended for 30 days. Keating had an 8–11 win–loss record, a 2.96 ERA, and 14 complete games in 34 games pitched in the 1914 season, and a 3–6 win–loss record, a 3.63 ERA, and eight complete games in 11 games pitched in 1915.

Keating pitched to a 5–6 win–loss record, a 3.07 ERA, and six complete games in 14 games pitched in the 1916 season. The Yankees sold Keating and Sweeney to the Toledo Iron Men of the American Association after the 1916 season. The Yankees reacquired Keating from Toledo in July 1918. He had a 2–2 win–loss record, a 3.91 ERA, and one complete game in 15 games pitched.

The Yankees sold Keating to the Boston Braves of the National League before the 1919 season. He had a 7–11 win–loss record and a 2.98 ERA with Boston in 1919, throwing nine complete games in 22 games pitched.

=== Later career ===
The Braves sold Keating to the Los Angeles Angels of the Pacific Coast League (PCL) before the 1920 season. After spending one season with Los Angeles, Keating jumped to the outlaw San Joaquin Valley League, an independent baseball league, in 1921. Los Angeles kept Keating on their reserve list. In 1921, Keating was the player-manager for the team representing Madera, California. In 1922 and 1923, he played for the team representing Dinuba, California.

In 1924, Keating applied for reinstatement to organized baseball. During the winter of 1924, he signed with the Hollywood Merchants of the semi-professional Orange Belt League. Commissioner Kenesaw Mountain Landis told him that he could be reinstated after the season if he paid a $200 fine ($3,757 in current dollar terms). He spent the 1924 season with the Racine, Wisconsin, team in the independent Midwest League. The team became defunct in September, and Keating returned to Bridgeport.

Keating was reinstated, and Los Angeles sold his contractual rights to Sacramento Senators of the PCL for $3,000 ($55,076 in current dollar terms) before the 1925 season. He was suspended in September 1926 for doctoring baseballs. In 1928, Keating won 27 games for Sacramento. He continued to pitch for Sacramento into the 1930 season. In July 1930, Sacramento traded Keating to the Portland Beavers for Mack Hillis and Roy Chesterfield. He began the 1931 season with the Beavers, but was released in June. He signed with the Seattle Indians of the PCL later that week, and they released him after the season. He returned to the PCL to pitch for Seattle in July 1934.

== Personal life ==
Keating and his wife, Elizabeth, married in Bridgeport in November 1915. They separated in March 1933 and she sued for divorce, custody of their daughter, and alimony. The divorce was granted that May.

Keating resided in Sacramento, California, after his playing career, and operated a tavern there. He died on December 28, 1963, in a Sacramento hospital.
