= Ed Sweeney (baseball) =

American baseball player (1888–1947)

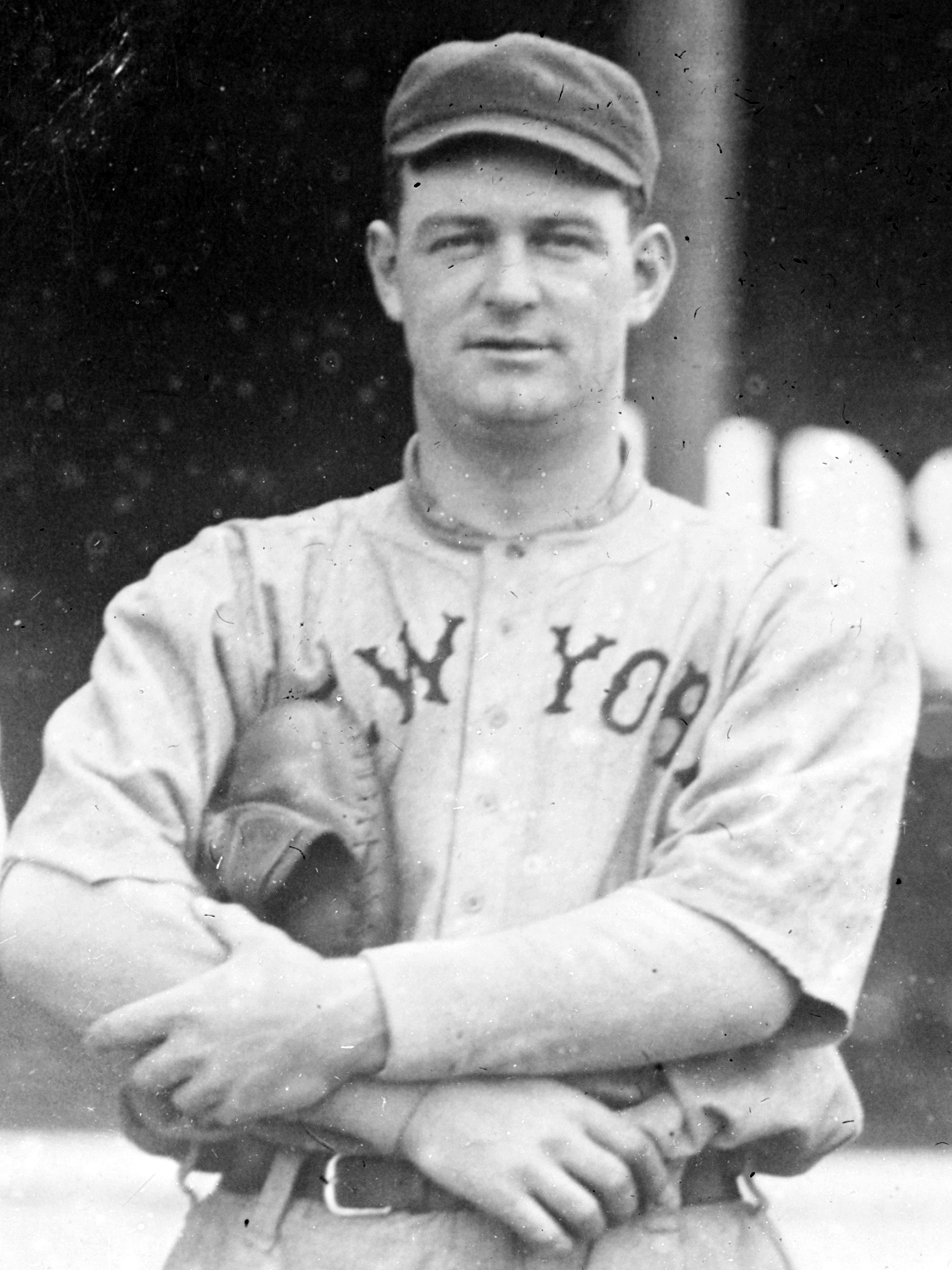
- Sweeney in 1915
- Catcher
- Born: July 19, 1888; Chicago, Illinois, U.S.
- Died: July 4, 1947 (aged 58); Chicago, Illinois, U.S.
- Batted: Right Threw: Right

MLB debut
- May 16, 1908, for the New York Highlanders

Last MLB appearance
- June 1, 1919, for the Pittsburgh Pirates

MLB statistics
- Batting average: .232
- Home runs: 3
- Runs batted in: 151
- Stats at Baseball Reference

Teams
- New York Highlanders / Yankees (1908–1915); Pittsburgh Pirates (1919)

Edward Francis Sweeney (July 19, 1888 – July 4, 1947), often referred to as "Big Ed Sweeney", was an American professional baseball catcher. He played in Major League Baseball for the New York Highlanders / Yankees of the American League from 1908 to 1915 and the Pittsburgh Pirates of the National League in 1919.

== Baseball career ==
=== Early career ===
Sweeney attended St. Ignatius College Prep in Chicago, Illinois, and played for their baseball team as a catcher. He also played baseball as a semi-professional. Sweeney made his professional baseball debut with the Columbia Gamecocks of the Class C South Atlantic League in 1905. He also played for Columbia during the 1906 season. The Atlanta Crackers of the Class A Southern Association drafted him from Columbia after the 1906 season. Playing for Atlanta in the 1907 season, Sweeney split time at catcher with Syd Smith.

One day in 1907, while warming up pitcher Russ Ford, a ball hit a concrete pillar, scuffing it. When Ford threw the ball again, it moved wildly. Ford began to experiment with this effect in secret, not telling Sweeney about it.

=== Major leagues ===
In 1908, Sweeney made his major league debut for the New York Highlanders of the American League on May 16. At the age of 19, he was the fourth-youngest player in the American League that season. When Kid Elberfeld became the Highlander's manager during the season, he increased Sweeney's playing time. Sweeney had a .146 batting average in 32 games played for the Highlanders in the 1908 season. In 1909, Sweeney batted .267 in 67 games. He led all American League catchers with 20 errors committed.

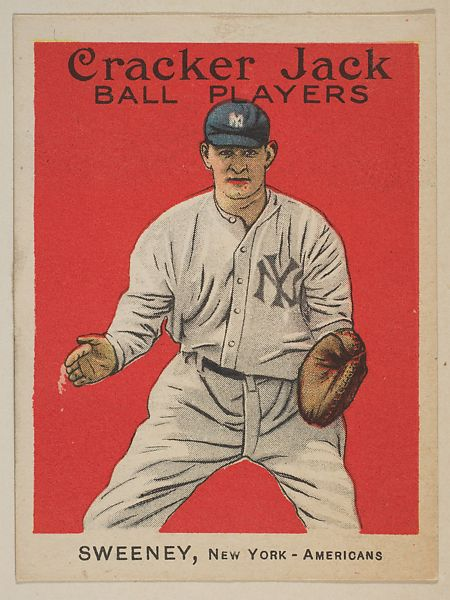
Sweeney baseball card, c. 1914–15

Ford joined the Highlanders in 1910, and told Sweeney about how he had learned to throw the emery ball following the initial discovery in 1907. Ford taught Sweeney how to catch it and requested that the Highlanders have Sweeney serve as his personal batterymate. That year, Sweeney batted .200 in 78 games played.

Sweeney batted .231 in 83 games during the 1911 season. He missed the beginning of the 1912 season due to a contract dispute with the team. He still caught 110 games that year, and batted .268. Sweeney led all American League catchers with 114 caught stealings (114). He also led American League catchers with 34 errors. After the 1912 season, Dave Fultz formed a union for baseball players, called the Players Fraternity, with Sweeney, Ty Cobb, Christy Mathewson, and Red Dooin serving as vice presidents. In 1913, Sweeney batted .265 in 117 games, and also hit his first two major league home runs. Sweeney again led the league in caught stealings that year, with 133, but also allowed the most stolen bases (205) and passed balls (19).

Before the 1914 season, Sweeney came to terms with the Buffalo Buffeds of the outlaw Federal League. Ban Johnson, the president of the American League, intervened in the negotiations. Claimed by both leagues, Sweeney signed with the Yankees for $9,000 ($289,286 in current dollar terms), the largest salary for a catcher to date. Ford jumped to the Federal League before the 1914 season, and Sweeney taught the emery ball to Ray Keating, a spitball pitcher.

On September 12, 1914, Sweeney caught Keating during a game against the Philadelphia Athletics. Eddie Collins became suspicious after striking out, and asked Tom Connolly, the home plate umpire, to inspect the ball. Connolly saw that the ball was scuffed, and investigated Keating's glove, finding emery paper. Following the discovery, the emery ball was outlawed, punishable with a 30-day suspension and a $100 fine ($3,214 in current dollar terms). Sweeney batted .213 with one home run in 87 games played in 1914.

=== Later career ===
Sweeney's playing time decreased in 1915; he played 53 games for the Yankees and batted .190. The Yankees demoted him to the Richmond Climbers of the Class AA International League in August. The Yankees did not bring Sweeney with them to spring training in 1916, and attempted to buy out the remainder of his contract before the 1916 season. They struggled to find a team that would acquire him, as his salary was tied for the 12th-highest in the league. Sweeney eventually signed with the Toledo Iron Men of the Class AA American Association. The Yankees sold Sweeney and Keating outright to Toledo before the 1917 season. With Toledo, Sweeney was reunited with Ford.

Following the United States' entry into World War I, Sweeney enlisted in the United States Army after the 1917 season. Commissioned as a sergeant, he managed U.S. Army baseball teams in 1918, before serving on the front lines in France with the 161st Artillery Brigade. Sweeney returned to the United States in January 1919. The Yankees traded Sweeney to the Pittsburgh Pirates of the National League for Gus Getz and Hooks Warner before the 1919 season. He had four hits in 42 at bats (.095 batting average) for the Pirates, before he was released in July.

Sweeney signed with the Seattle Rainiers of the Class AA Pacific Coast League for the remainder of the 1919 season. The Kansas City Blues of the American Association purchased Sweeney from Seattle before the 1920 season. He was released to the San Antonio Bears of the Class A Texas League after the season. Sweeney returned to Chicago and played semi-professional baseball in 1921, and he signed with the Racine, Wisconsin, franchise of the Midwest League, an independent baseball league, in 1923.

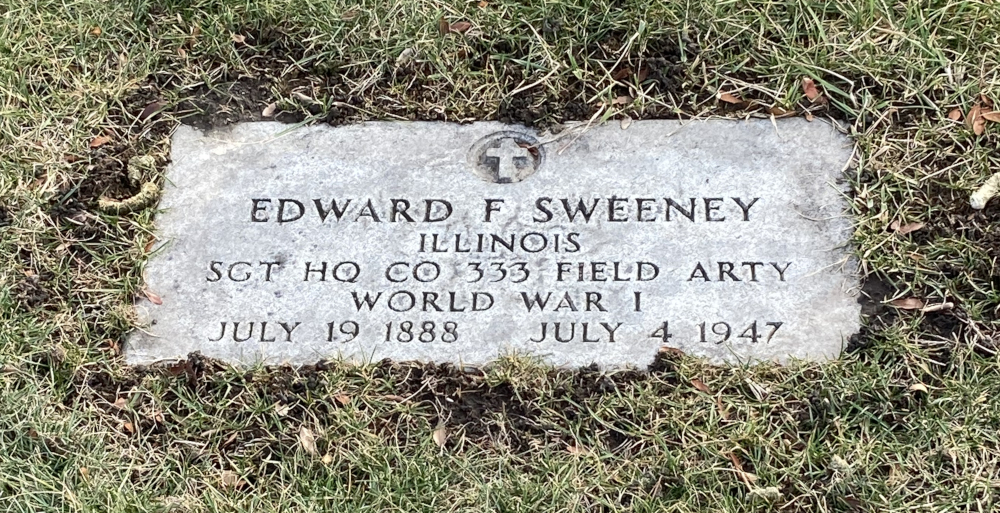
Sweeney's grave at Mount Carmel Cemetery

== Personal life ==
Sweeney was born in Chicago, Illinois, on July 19, 1888. His father was a battalion chief in the Chicago Fire Department and a contractor who built a garage for his sons, Ed and Gene, that they turned into a taxi business. Sweeney stood at 6 feet 1 inch (1.85 m) and weighed approximately 200 pounds (91 kg), giving him the nickname "Big Ed Sweeney".

Sweeney died at his home in Chicago on July 4, 1947 after a long illness. He was buried at Mount Carmel Cemetery in Hillside, Illinois.
