= Emery Houses =

- U.S. National Register of Historic Places
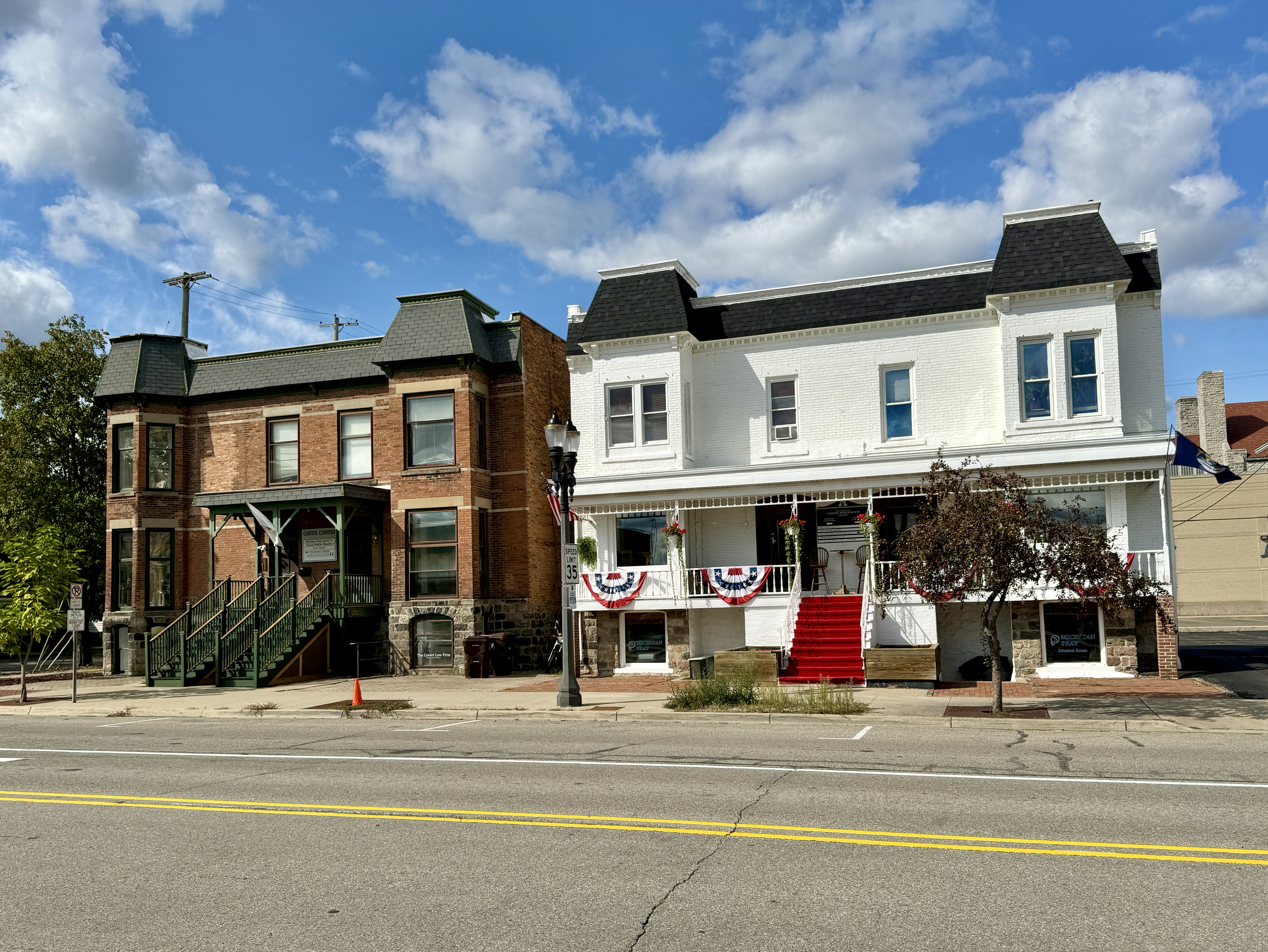
- Interactive map of Emery Houses
- Location: 320-322 and 326-328 W. Ottawa St, Lansing, Michigan
- Coordinates: 42°44′05″N 84°33′25″W
- Area: less than one acre
- Built: 1888
- Architectural style: Late Victorian, Second Empire Double Houses
- MPS: Downtown Lansing MRA
- NRHP reference No.: 93001409
- Added to NRHP: December 10, 1993

The Emery Houses are two duplexes located at 320–322 and 326–328 West Ottawa Street in Lansing, Michigan, United States. They were listed on the National Register of Historic Places in 1993. The structure at 320–322 West Ottawa is significant due to its association with Populist activist Sarah E. Van De Vort Emery, a well-known public speaker and writer of the 1880s and 1890s.

== History ==
The land on which these houses sit was purchased in 1885 by Sarah Emery and her son Archibald. The two houses were likely built on the lots in 1888 and 1889. Archibald Emery lived in the unit 328 from 1888 to 1894, and sold the entire structure to W. H. Bosley in 1902. Sarah Emery and her husband Wesley lived in unit 320 from about 1889 to about 1891. In 1891, one half of the duplex was sold, with the Emerys retaining the other half. Sarah Emery died in 1895, and her estate sold the remaining house to Mrs. Cora Murray in 1900. In the subsequent years, the houses were used for different things, including division into apartments and offices.

== Description ==
The Emery Houses are a pair of brick Second Empire-inspired double houses on a high stone foundation. They have slightly different dimensions, with 326-328 measuring roughly 44 feet wide by 40 feet deep, and 320-322 measuring roughly 48 feet wide and 45 feet deep. The apparent mansard roofs are decorative, with the actual roofs being low-pitched slopes draining toward the rear of the house. The houses have stone drip courses, decorative bands, and lintels. Stamped tin cornices top the brick, creating a small overhang topped with the false mansards.

The front of 320-322 is symmetrical, with end bays protruding from the face. A high porch, not original, stretches between across the facade with a single stair access. Windows on the first floor are single pane, replacing the original double-hing units. Second floor windows are double-hung.

The front of 320-322 is asymmetrical, with an octagonal bay at the corner. Each side of the octagon has a tall double-hung window. Windows on the first and second floors through the building are split about two-thirds of the way up. There are two front entrances reached through a small porch, also with two stairs.
