= Emery High School =

Emery High School may refer to several schools in the United States:

- Emery High School (Utah), Castle Dale, Utah
- Emery High School (South Dakota), Emery, South Dakota
- Emery Secondary School, Emeryville, California
- The Emery/Weiner School, Houston, Texas

There is one high school in Canada with a similar name:

- Emery Collegiate Institute, Toronto, Ontario, Canada
