= Emery Homestead =

Historic house in Maine, United States

- U.S. National Register of Historic Places
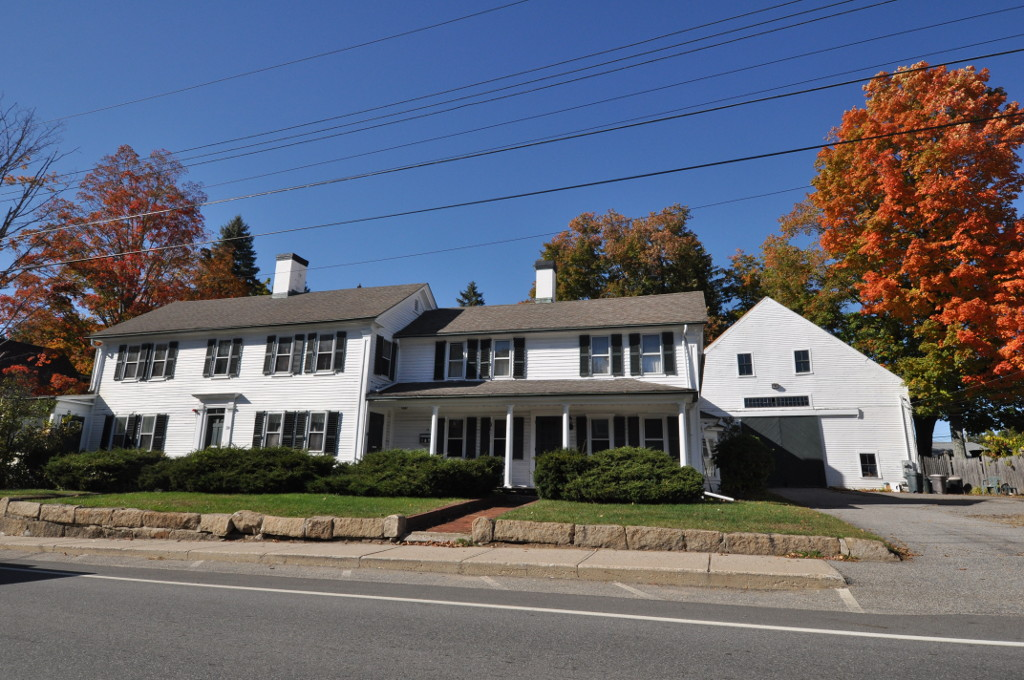

- Location within Maine Location within the United States
- Location: 1 and 3 Lebanon St., Sanford, Maine
- Coordinates: 43°26′26″N 70°46′43″W
- Area: 1 acre (0.40 ha)
- Built: 1830
- NRHP reference No.: 80000379
- Added to NRHP: June 22, 1980

The Emery Homestead is a historic house at 1 and 3 Lebanon Street in Sanford, Maine. Its early construction dating to 1830, the building traces an evolution of use and alteration by a single family over five generations of ownership. The house, a local landmark, was listed on the National Register of Historic Places in 1980.

== Description and history ==
The Emery Homestead is set on the north side of Lebanon Street (United States Route 202), just west of its junction with Main Street (Maine State Route 109) in the center of Sanford. It is a rambling connected New England farmstead, with its main house joined to a barn via a series of ells. The original homestead, located at the left end of the complex is a 2 1/2-story wood-frame structure, five bays wide, with a side-gable roof and central chimney. The main entrance is flanked by Doric pilasters and topped by an entablature. To its right, offset to the rear, is a two-story ell, also five bays wide and with a side-gable roof; its first floor has a hip-roofed porch. A second ell extends to the rear of this one, connecting the house to the large barn.

The first member of the Emery family to settle in Sanford was Caleb Emery, who arrived in the area in 1773. His son William Jr., built the original block of this house in 1830. Both of these men were active in Sanford's civic affairs, serving in a wide variety of public posts and elected offices. The first ell was built in 1862 by William's son Charles Oscar. The last major addition was made in 1908 by Charles Oscar's son Edward Henry, who added a sunroom to the left of the main house, and extended it to the rear to provide a modern kitchen and dining area. The Emerys have a continuous history of civic involvement that includes the establishment of a scholarship fund for local high school students, and an endowment for the library at nearby Nasson College.

== See also ==
- National Register of Historic Places listings in York County, Maine
