= Smith–Emery House =

Historic house in Maine, United States

- U.S. National Register of Historic Places
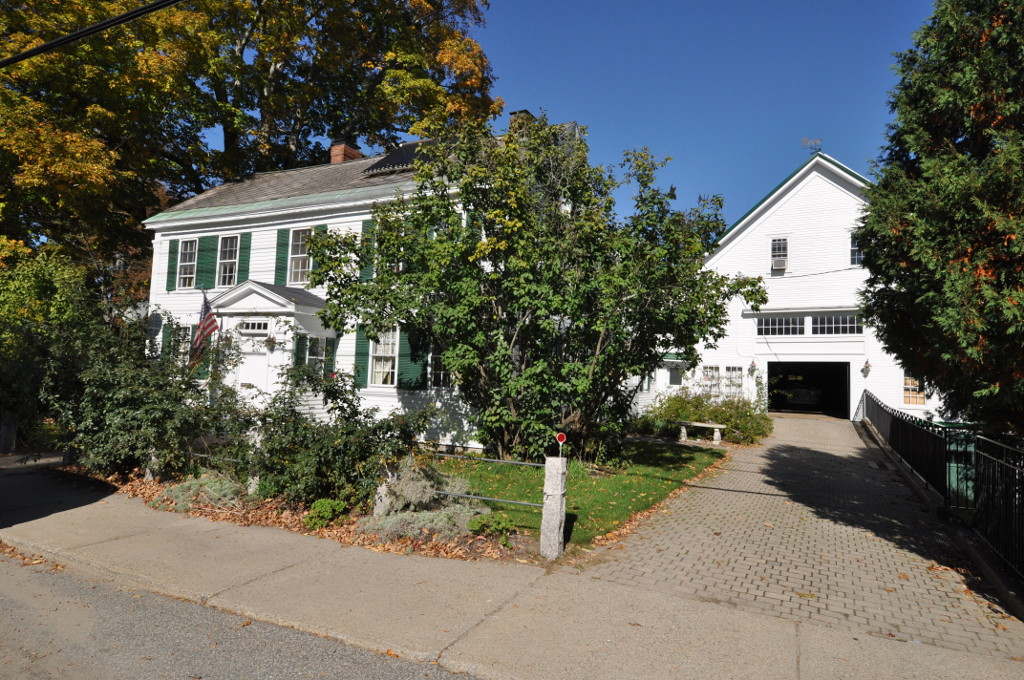

- Location within Maine Location within the United States
- Location: 400 Main St., Springvale, Maine
- Coordinates: 43°28′7″N 70°48′7″W
- Area: 2.1 acres (0.85 ha)
- Built: 1847
- Architectural style: Greek Revival
- NRHP reference No.: 98001233
- Added to NRHP: October 8, 1998

The Smith–Emery House is a historic house at 400 Main Street in the Springvale village of Sanford, Maine. Built in 1847, it is one of Sanford's largest and finest examples of Greek Revival architecture, and was owned by two prominent local businessmen. It was listed on the National Register of Historic Places in 1998.

== Description and history ==
The Smith–Emery House is set on the north side of Main Street, between it and Springvale's mill pond. It is a 2 1/2-story wood-frame structure, five bays wide, with a side-gable roof, clapboard siding, and a granite foundation. A two-story ell extends to the rear of the main block, connecting it to a barn that is offset to the right. The main (south-facing) facade is symmetrically arranged, with the entrance in a projecting gable-roofed vestibule. The entrance is framed by pilasters at the sides and four-light transom window above. The building interior follows a typical center-chimney plan, with a narrow winding stair in the entry, and parlors to either side. Interior finishes are Greek Revival, and fairly modest.

The house was built, probably around 1847, for Albert J. Smith, owner of a local hardware business. Smith was also active in local politics, serving as town selectman, treasurer, and deputy sheriff. The house was owned by his son Leander, a butcher, and was sold in 1897 to Samuel Emery, whose family owned it until 1982. Emery sold home furnishings, and in 1899 became owner of the Springvale Cotton Mills. The house is one of the largest and least-altered examples of Greek Revival architecture in the village.

== See also ==
- National Register of Historic Places listings in York County, Maine
