= Emery ball =

Illegal baseball pitch

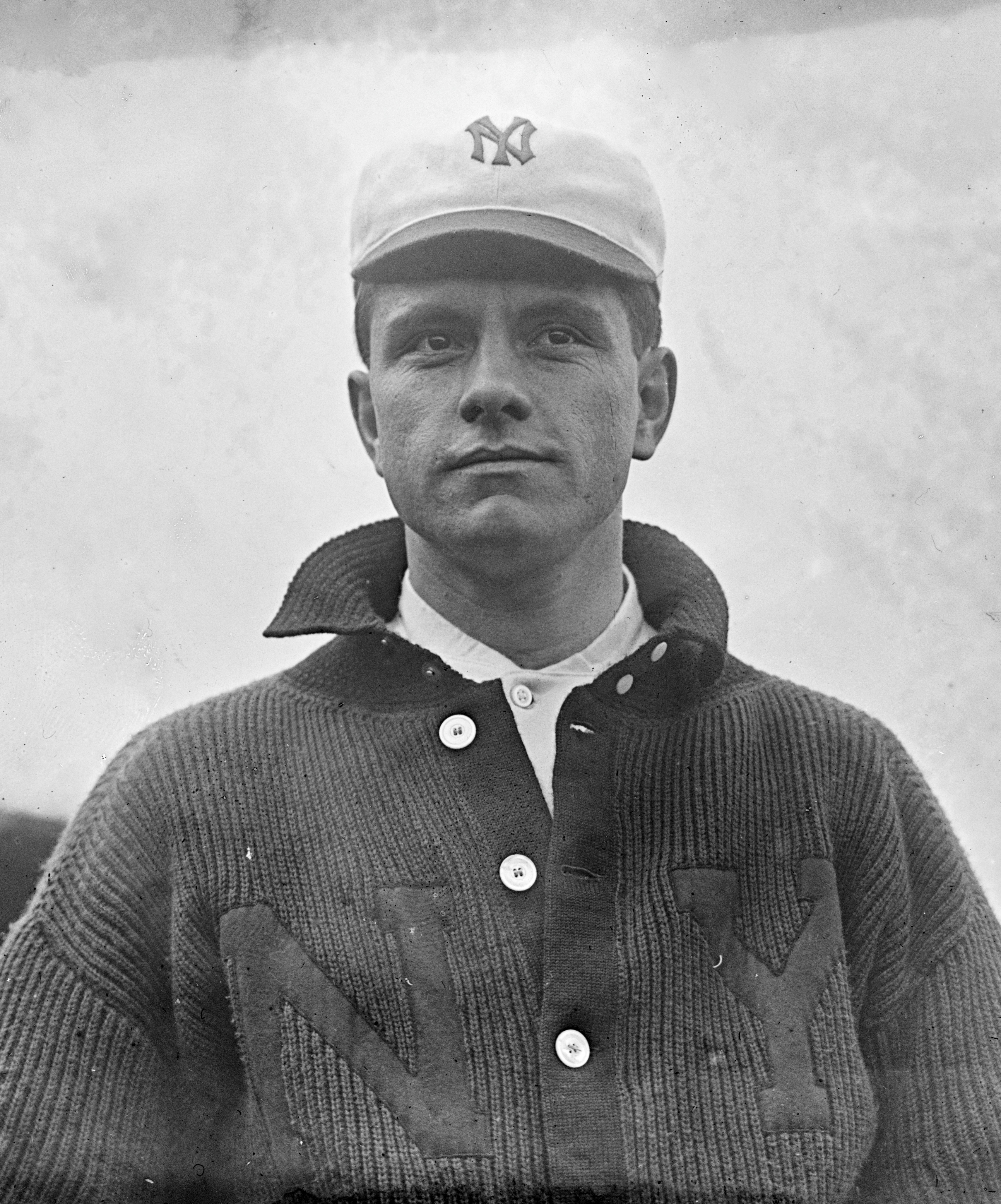
Russ Ford developed the emery ball.

An emery ball is an illegal pitch in baseball, in which the ball has been altered by scuffing it with a rough surface, such as an emery board or sandpaper. This technique alters the spin of the ball, causing it to move in an atypical manner, as more spin gives the illusion that a ball rises, while less spin makes the ball drop predictably. The general term for altering the ball in any way is doctoring. The emery ball differs from the spitball, in which the ball is doctored by applying saliva or Vaseline. Vaseline or saliva smooths the baseball, while the emery paper roughens it.

Russ Ford discovered the emery ball in the minor leagues in 1907 when he saw what a scuff on a baseball did to its movement. He began keeping emery paper in his baseball glove. Though he initially kept the pitch a secret, he had to inform his catcher, Ed Sweeney, about it. Sweeney taught it to other pitchers, and the pitch was discovered when an umpire found emery paper in Ray Keating's glove in 1914. The pitch was outlawed, which led to the banning of the spitball.

== Development ==
In 1907, Russ Ford, a pitcher for the Atlanta Crackers of the Southern Association, was warming up under a grandstand with catcher Ed Sweeney when a ball struck a concrete pillar. He threw the ball again and noticed that it moved differently than before. Ford soon learned that by making a rough patch on one side of the ball, he could use the rough spot to get a firmer grip on the ball and increase the spin rate as he threw, making it harder to hit. Ford first used the pitch in a game in 1909, hiding a piece of emery paper in his baseball glove.

Ford joined the New York Highlanders of the American League in 1910. He told Sweeney, who also played for the Highlanders, how he had perfected the pitch and taught him how to catch it. Ford publicly claimed to be throwing a spitball, which was legal at the time. According to Sweeney, only two others on the team knew: Eddie Foster and Earle Gardner. They were roommates when the Yankees played on the road, and Ford told them about the pitch. Gardner went to the Toledo Iron Men of the American Association in 1912, where he taught the pitch to Cy Falkenberg. Other pitchers began to learn to throw the emery ball, and it was suspected that Sweeney taught them. Foster never told anybody about the pitch; when Foster played for the Washington Senators and Falkenberg pitched against them during the 1914 season, Senators' manager Clark Griffith noticed that he had the same pitch as Ford and questioned Foster, who said nothing.

Another origin story suggests that George Kahler of the Cleveland Indians discovered the pitch and taught it to Vean Gregg. When Gregg went to the Boston Red Sox, he taught it to Smoky Joe Wood. In The Neyer/James Guide to Pitchers, Rob Neyer and Bill James refer to Kahler as the second pitcher to use the emery ball. Other pitchers who used the emery ball included Lefty Leifield and Johnny Lush.

== Public discovery ==
On September 12, 1914, during a game between the Philadelphia Athletics and New York Yankees, Philadelphia's Eddie Collins struck out against Ray Keating of the Yankees in the first inning. Suspicious of how Keating made his pitches move, Collins did not swing at a pitch in his second at bat. After Collins struck out for the second time, he asked the home plate umpire, Tom Connolly, to inspect the ball. Connolly took the ball and found it to be scuffed. He inspected Keating's glove and found a piece of emery paper inside.

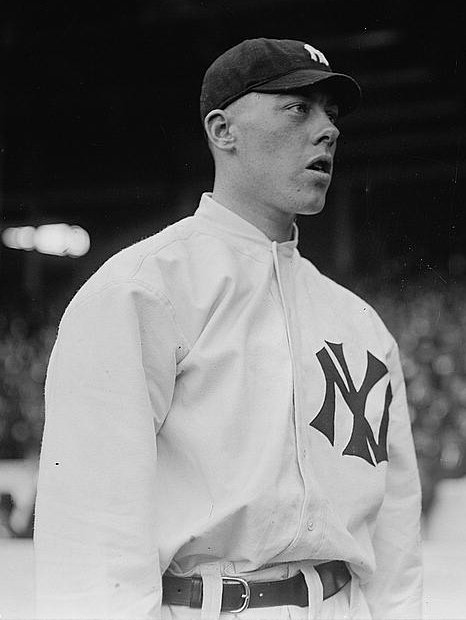
Ray Keating was caught using the emery ball.

Connolly sent two scuffed balls and a piece of emery paper to Ban Johnson, the president of the American League. Johnson declared that players caught using the emery ball would face a $100 fine ($3,214 today) and a 30-day suspension. James A. Gilmore barred its use in the Federal League in 1915, also mandating a 30-day suspension, but with a fine of $200 ($6,365 in current dollar terms). The National League also barred its use. Umpires began taking scuffed baseballs out of play, which doubled the number of baseballs required for a game.

Following the discovery of the emery ball, Griffith began to call for outlawing the spitball, which occurred after the 1919 season. In the rules of baseball, Rule 8.02(6) specifically bars "what is called the shine ball, spit ball, mud ball or emery ball." A 2007 alteration of the baseball rules changed the punishment to a mandatory ejection and 10-game suspension.

== Further use ==
Whitey Ford was accused of scuffing baseballs in his later career. He acknowledged using a custom ring and a rasp to scuff baseballs later in his career, and said that he sometimes used his belt buckle or catcher Elston Howard's shin guards. He denied doing it in 1961, the year he won the Cy Young Award.

Don Sutton was often accused of scuffing baseballs during his career. Tommy John was also accused. Rick Honeycutt was caught with a thumbtack taped to his thumb and sandpaper hidden in his glove on September 30, 1980. He was suspended for 10 games.

In 1985, Jim Frey, the manager of the Chicago Cubs, accused Mike Scott of the Houston Astros of using sandpaper to scuff baseballs. The New York Mets accused Scott of using the emery ball in the 1986 National League Championship Series. In an interview in 2011, Scott said, "I've thrown balls that were scuffed but I haven't scuffed every ball that I've thrown."

Joe Niekro of the Minnesota Twins was caught doctoring baseballs in 1987. During a game, umpire Tim Tschida asked him to empty his pockets and a nail file and sandpaper that had been touched up to be flesh-colored came out. Niekro, who also threw a knuckleball, claimed that he used the nail file on his nails for the knuckleball. The sandpaper had been glued to Niekro's hand. A week after Niekro was caught, Kevin Gross of the Philadelphia Phillies was caught with a piece of sandpaper in his glove. Brian Moehler of the Detroit Tigers was caught with sandpaper in his glove in 1999, and served a ten-game suspension.

== See also ==
- Cheating in baseball
- Ball tampering, the equivalent in cricket
