= Emery, Arizona =

Populated place in Graham County, Arizona

- Populated place
- Location within the state of Arizona Emery (the United States)
- Coordinates: 33°04′11″N 110°01′01″W
- Country: United States
- State: Arizona
- County: Graham
- Elevation: 2,681 ft (817 m)
- Time zone: UTC-7 (Mountain (MST))
  - Summer (DST): UTC-7 (MST)
- Area code: 928
- GNIS feature ID: 4432

Emery is a populated place in Graham County, Arizona, United States.

The community was named after Emery, Utah.
