= Emory and Henry College Hospital =

Emory & Henry College Hospital was a Confederate hospital during the American Civil War. The First Battle of Saltville took place near the hospital.

== Establishment of the hospital ==
The Confederate command selected the hills of southwest Virginia for a hospital as they determined it was an unlikely location to see combat. The command chose the Emory & Henry College for their hospital. This campus was located in the foothills of the Appalachian Mountains, and was adjacent to a railroad. Thus, the General Hospital at Emory and Henry College was born in May 1862.

The medical corps of Virginia agreed to pay the college $2,500 in Confederate dollars for the first year of use. One year later the Secretary of War agreed to increase the amount paid to $4,000 at the request of the trustees. Stevenson writes, "The rent received was invested in Confederate and Virginia bonds to serve as an endowment for the future." The rental of the farm, located adjacent to the campus, was a further source of income. The board of Trustees voted in 1861 to allow Professors Wiley, Davis, Buchanan, and Longley to have equal shares of the farmland for $500 a year. These revenue sources allowed the college to maintain its grounds and survive the war years.

== Battle of Saltville ==
However, the war did come to Emory, Virginia. In October 1864, a major force of over 10,000 troops clashed at the salt works at Saltville, Virginia. Following the battle, Federal black soldiers of the 5th United States Colored Cavalry Regiment, and white soldiers of the 11th Missouri Cavalry, 13th Kentucky Cavalry, and the 12th Ohio Cavalry were treated for their wounds at local field hospitals and at the Emory & Henry College Hospital.

The number of actual federal patients, following the battle, varies from 100 to 200. However, most records indicate that between 150 and 200 were Federal prisoners. The hospital housed 350 beds, and was under the care of Dr. J. B. Murfree. The Federal wounded were placed on the third and fourth floors of the main building. These floors were only accessible by two staircases at either end of the building, where guards were placed to prevent Federal troops from escaping. The prisoners who were housed at Wiley Hall, and testified at the trial of Champ Ferguson, included: Wm. H. Gardner, the Surgeon for the 13th Kentucky Cavalry; George W. Cutler, a second lieutenant in the 11th Michigan Cavalry; Lieutenant Smith of the 13th Kentucky Cavalry; Orange Sells of the 12th Ohio Cavalry; Captain Dagenfeld of the 12th Ohio Cavalry; Harry Shocker of the 12th Ohio Cavalry.

William H. Gardner was a Federal surgeon who had been captured at Saltville. After being paroled by Major General Breckinridge, he stayed behind at Emory and Henry College Hospital to treat the massive casualties. On October 26, 1864, Gardner noted: "On Friday, October 7, several armed men entered the hospital around 10 p.m. and went up into the rooms occupied by the Federal wounded prisoners, and shot 2 of them (Negroes) dead in their beds."

== The murders ==
Orange Sells testified at the trial of Champ Ferguson after the war that, "The night before the killing, we heard a rustling on the stairway and immediately three men came into the room. One had a lighted candle and the other two had revolvers. They looked into each of our faces and after they got around, one of them remarked, ‘There are none of them here,’ and went out. They had hardly got out—had not been gone more than half a minute—until we heard firing in the next room to us. Some six shots were fired, and immediately afterward a Negro soldier was carried, dead, out of that room. Another Negro soldier ran into our room wrapped in a sheet." Two different sources sited the death of at least two Negroes at the hospital, but neither listed their names.

On October 8, 1864, Champ Ferguson entered the Emory and Henry College General Hospital with twelve to fifteen men almost unnoticed. Ferguson and another man then entered the room of Harry Shocker. Upon entering, a man with Champ recognized Shocker from the previous battle and said, "There was a wounded boy out of the 11th Michigan Cavalry lying in a bunk nearby. There is that boy now. I saved his life. He was lying among negroes at the time." Champ then said, "If I’d seen you lying among the Negroes, it would have been all day with you." The man with Champ then asked a boy in the room if he had any money, the boy replied no, and the man pulled out a $10 Confederate note and told him that would keep him in tobacco. Champ then asked Shocker, "Do you know Lieutenant Smith?" and Shocker replied no. Champ then said to Shocker, "Yes you do you damned Yankee, you know him well enough, but you don’t want to know him now. Where is he, then?" Shocker did not reply to Ferguson, and Ferguson got up to leave and told Shocker, "I have a begrudge against Smith; we’ll find him."

The Smith that Ferguson was referring to was Lieutenant Elza C. Smith of the 13th Kentucky Cavalry. The twenty-nine-year-old Smith was a relative of Ferguson's first wife. Smith had joined the 13th in Clinton County, Kentucky, in 1863, and spent much of his service chasing down terrorists such as Ferguson. Ferguson was a confederate sympathizer in an area that was predominantly Union. Ferguson saw it as his duty to form a guerrilla party to attack Union sympathizers. According to Thurman Sensing, Ferguson's biographer, Smith's death was the culmination of eleven murders. Ferguson allegedly suffered at the hands of his pro-Union neighbors during the war. Dr. J. B. Murfree stated that Smith made Ferguson's wife undress and march around before him along a public road. Sensing then concludes that with the death of Smith, his family honor was restored.

Ferguson then attempted to ascend one of the stairways in the hospital to gain access to the third floor. The guard that was placed by Dr. Murfree and the quartermaster to keep the federal soldiers on the third floor stopped Ferguson and the men with him. The band of raiders advanced on the guard swearing that they would get up the steps in spite of the guard. Undaunted, the guard raised his gun and leveled it at Ferguson and told him that he would shoot him if he approached another step. Angrily, Ferguson and the men left that guard to find another way up the stairs.

Ferguson, unable to secure the first guard, found it much easier to pass the second. After ascending to the second floor, Ferguson left his own guard at the steps to stop anyone who might come looking for him. Three Confederate soldiers came into the room of Orange Sells, Lieutenant Smith, and Captain Dagenfeld, of the 12th Ohio Cavalry. Ferguson, flanked by one unknown man, and Hildreth, (rank unknown), walked into the room without saying a word, pulled out his musket and stopped directly in front of Sells's bed. Lieutenant Smith recognized Ferguson as he reached the middle of the floor and moaned, "Champ, is that you?" Ferguson made no reply, but jerked his gun up to point at Smith and hit the breech with his right hand. He then looked at Smith and asked, "Smith, do you see this?" Smith then begged Ferguson not to shoot saying, "Champ, for God's sake, don’t shoot me here." Ferguson then put the gun to Smith's head and shot three times before the gun went off. The ball hit Smith in the side of the forehead and went through the other ear. Five witnesses in the hospital testified at the trial of Champ Ferguson that they heard or saw Ferguson shoot Smith. Even the Rebel quartermaster's sergeant, A.J. Watkins, testified that he saw Smith dead in his bed promptly after hearing a shot.

No one said anything after Smith begged Ferguson not to shoot. Ferguson's partner in crime at the hospital, Hildreth, had been watching the event with a carbine in one hand and a pistol in the other guarding the Federal wounded in the room. After the shot, Hildreth turned to Ferguson and said, "Champ, be sure your work is well done." After examining the body, Ferguson concluded, "He is damned dead." Dr. Murfree was at the office of the hospital when a nurse came in saying a lot of soldiers had killed a man in the hospital. Dr. Murfree and Major Stringfield, an officer in the Army of Virginia, took off to the hospital. Upon reaching the hospital, the pair was confronted by one of Ferguson's men that was guarding the steps with drawn revolvers. Dr. Murfree told the man to go downstairs, but the man replied that Captain Ferguson had ordered him to no let anyone pass. Dr. Murfree pushed past the guard while Major Stringfield remained behind to contend with the guard.

Dr. Murfree met Ferguson on the next set of steps flanked by his armed guard. Ferguson was yelling loudly that he intended to kill all the Federal officers in Smith's room. This included Colonel Hanson of the 37th Kentucky Volunteers, and Captain Degenfeld of the 12th Ohio Cavalry. Dr. Murfree exclaimed, "Gentlemen, you must go down from here; this is a place for the sick and wounded, and you must not disturb them," to which Ferguson retorted, "I will shoot you." Dr. Murfree repeated his sentiment, stating that he was in charge of the hospital before Champ Ferguson advanced to within three feet of Dr. Murfree and said, "I don’t care who you are, damn you, I will kill you." Abruptly, Lieutenant Philpot, of Ferguson's company stepped in between the pair and motioned that they should leave. The group then mounted their horses and rode off shouting, "We have killed the man that killed Hamilton."

The most interesting point that Dr. Murfree makes is that the group ran off yelling that they had avenged Hamilton. One other witness made reference to Captain Hamilton in the trial of Champ Ferguson. This circumstance refutes Sensing's conclusions that he was murdered due to his heinous acts.

== Aftermath ==
The Federal prisoners at Emory and Henry College Hospital appear to have been treated well by the Confederate staff. One soldier said that he "was treated first rate while in the hospital." The board of trustees at Emory and Henry College met on November 12, 1864 to discuss the running of the hospital. They stated that the grounds were well taken care of; in fact, improvements were made to the facilities during the war. Unlike many schools during the Civil War, Emory and Henry College suffered no structural damage as result of the war. The only damage done in the hospital was to furniture and was repaired or paid for by the Confederate States of America. Following the massacres on the field and at the hospital, both Union and Confederate commands started receiving reports of inhumane acts. The story made its way all the way to the Secretary of War in Washington; he demanded the extradition of Ferguson to Federal authorities. In the case that the Confederacy refused to send Ferguson, the secretary said that "immediate retaliation [will] be enforced upon such Confederate prisoners as we may have in our possession, man for man."

== Bibliography ==
=== Primary sources ===
- Emory and Henry College Board of Trustees, Minutes of the Board of Trustees. June 10, 1863 – November 12, 1864.
- Holston Cemetery, Emory, Virginia. December 5, 2005.
- U.S. War Department, The War of the Rebellion: A Compilation of the Official Records of the Union and Confederate Armies, 128 vols. (Washington, D.C.; GPO, 1880–1901), 1st Ser., 39(1-2) 554, 555, 556, 557, 786.

=== Secondary sources ===
- David E. Brown, "History of the 5th Regiment Cavalry, United States Colored Troops" 8 August 2005. (2005 September 15).
- Dr. L. B. Murfree, Personal account of Events at Emory and Henry College General Hospital. Quoted in Thurman Sensing, Champ Ferguson: Confederate Guerilla. (Nashville, Tennessee, Vanderbilt University Press, 1942) 178–186.
- George J. Stevenson, Increase in Excellence: A History of Emory and Henry College (New York: Appleton Century Crafts, 1963), 93–95.
- Mosgrove, George Dallas. Kentucky Cavaliers in Dixie; Or, the Reminiscences of a Kentucky Cavalryman. (Louisville: Courier-Journal Job Printing Co., 1895) quoted in Thomas D. Mays, "The Battle of Saltville" in Black Soldiers in Blue: African American Troops in the Civil War Era ed. John David Smith (North Carolina: North Carolina Press 2002), 200–226.
- "Regimental Personal Descriptions, Orders, Letters, Guard Reports, Council of Administration, Funds Accounts, Telegrams and Clothing Accounts of Noncommissioned Staff", vol. I, "5th United States Colored Cavalry", (Washington, D.C., Record Group 94, National Archives). Quoted in Thurman Sensing, Champ Ferguson: Confederate Guerilla. (Nashville, Tennessee, Vanderbilt University Press, 1942) 178–186.
- Richmond Enquirer, October 8, 1864. Quoted in Thomas D. Mays, "The Battle of Saltville" in Black Soldiers in Blue: African American Troops in the Civil War Era ed. John David Smith (North Carolina: North Carolina Press 2002), 200-226
- Thomas D. Mays, "The Battle of Saltville" in Black Soldiers in Blue: African American Troops in the Civil War Era ed. John David Smith (North Carolina: North Carolina Press 2002), 200–226.
- Thurman Sensing, Champ Ferguson: Confederate Guerilla. (Nashville, Tennessee, Vanderbilt University Press, 1942) 178–186.
- Transcript from the Trial of Champ Ferguson, (Washington, D.C., National Archives, 1865). Quoted in Thurman Sensing, Champ Ferguson: Confederate Guerilla. (Nashville, Tennessee, Vanderbilt University Press, 1942) 178–186.
