= Emery Farm (Durham, New Hampshire) =

Historic family farm

Coordinates: 43°7′56″N 70°52′39″W

- Industry: Farming
- Founded: 1655
- Headquarters: 135 Piscataqua Road, Durham, NH, United States
- Website: www.emeryfarm.com

Emery Farm is a continually owned family farm in the United States founded in 1655 by the Hills family and located in Durham, New Hampshire. During its history, the farm was used mainly for timber harvesting and for growing hay and grain that was sold locally for animal feed.

Two new additions to the farm have taken place since opening over 350 years ago. While the farm has functioned since 1655, the well known farm stand was established in the 1970s providing customers with local grown fruits and vegetables. In 2016, the new owner, family friend Holly Philbrick-Craig, added a new cafe to the stand. In 2019, the farm stand officially retired, and a new market and cafe was built in its place. The 2,800 square foot building sells local, fresh, and sustainable products including seasonal items such as pumpkins and Christmas trees and offers activities like apple picking.

Parts of the farm have been placed under conservation protection in stages. In 2006, 59 acres were protected north of Route 4 through conservation easements held with the Society for the Protection of New Hampshire Forests, including 48 acres of active farmland and an 11-acre adjacent woodland donation. In 2018, the Forest Society purchased an additional 36-acre conservation easement, protecting agricultural fields and pasture south of Route 4, about 1,700 feet of Route 4 frontage, and about 2,500 feet of tidal frontage along the Oyster River and Smith Creek.

In March 2017, Emery Farm workers fell victim to assault and robbery. 47-year-old Joshua Flynn, entered the farm stand and cafe, and attempted to rob the establishment after tying up some of the staff. Reports of kidnapping and sexual assault took place while the robbing continued, but police were called in time to arrest Flynn.

Emery Farm has a vast history of collaboration involving University of New Hampshire Horticulture students. Students learn from farming experience offered by Emery Farm year round. The experience helps students apply teachings to their own farm production on school property which provides fresh food to the universities dining halls.

== See also ==
- List of oldest companies
