= Emery Farmstead =

- U.S. National Register of Historic Places
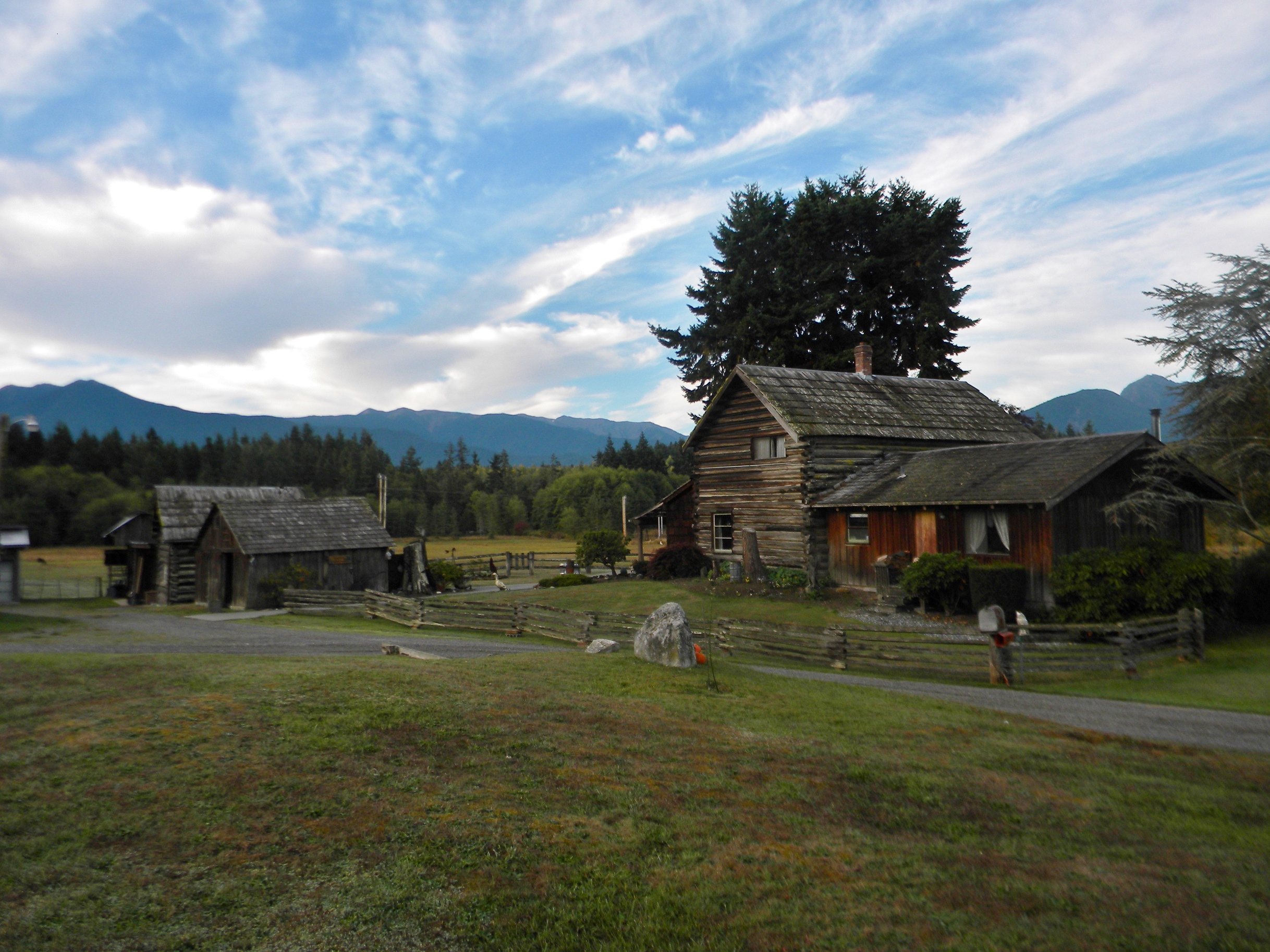

- Location within Washington (state) Location within the United States
- Location: At junction of Emery Road and Emery Lane, about 8.5 miles (13.7 km) southeast of Port Angeles
- Nearest city: Port Angeles, Washington
- Coordinates: 48°04′12″N 123°15′46″W
- Area: 5 acres (2.0 ha)
- Built: 1889
- NRHP reference No.: 88002746
- Added to NRHP: December 16, 1988

Emery Farmstead, also known as Chancellor-Emery Farmstead, is a historic farm located at the junction of Emery Road and Emery Lane, about 8.5 miles (13.7 km) southeast of Port Angeles, Washington. The farm is composed of five well preserved historic buildings on a 5 acres (2.0 ha) area. The log cabin (48°04′11″N 123°15′46″W) is the newest building in the farmstead and was built in 1889. Shortly after its construction, and before 1900, the two-story log house (48°04′12″N 123°15′47″W) was built nearby. The granary (48°04′11″N 123°15′45″W) and root cellar (48°04′11″N 123°15′46″W) are two log structures located shortly east of the buildings. A log shed (48°04′11″N 123°15′46″W) is the original living quarters, built in 1885.

The farm was added to the National Register of Historic Places in 1988.
